= 2012 Africa Cup of Nations Group A =

Football tournament group stage

Group A of the 2012 Africa Cup of Nations ran from 21 January until 29 January. It consisted of Equatorial Guinea, Libya, Senegal and Zambia. The matches were held at Equatorial Guinea. Zambia and Equatorial Guinea progressed to the quarterfinals.

== Standings ==
Pos	Team	Pld	W	D	L	GF	GA	GD	Pts	Qualification
1	Zambia	3	2	1	0	5	3	+2	7	Advance to knockout stage
2	Equatorial Guinea (H)	3	2	0	1	3	2	+1	6	Advance to knockout stage
3	Libya	3	1	1	1	4	4	0	4	
4	Senegal	3	0	0	3	3	6	−3	0	

Source: CAF
(H) Hosts

All times are West Africa Time (UTC+1).

== Equatorial Guinea vs. Libya ==
21 January 2012
19:30

Equatorial Guinea	1–0	Libya
Balboa 87'	Report

Estadio de Bata, Bata
Attendance: 35,000
Referee: Noumandiez Doué (Ivory Coast)

Equatorial Guinea	Libya

GK	1	Danilo
DF	3	Kily
DF	15	Lawrence Doe
DF	4	Rui
DF	5	Fousseny Kamissoko
MF	14	Ben Konaté
MF	6	Juvenal (c)
FW	11	Javier Balboa
FW	12	Thierry Fidjeu		(substituted off) 74'
FW	10	Iván Bolado		(substituted off) 69'
FW	8	Randy	(yellow card) 68'
Substitutions:
MF	17	Narcisse Ekanga		(substituted on) 69'
FW	9	Rodolfo Bodipo	(substituted on) 74'	(substituted off) 85'
MF	20	Daniel Ekedo		(substituted on) 85'
Manager:
(Brazil) Gílson Paulo

GK	1	Samir Aboud (c)
DF	3	Abdulaziz Belraysh
DF	5	Younes Al Shibani
DF	14	Ali Salama
DF	2	Rabea Al-Laafi
MF	10	Ahmed Sa'ad	(yellow card) 82'
MF	23	Djamal Mohamed
MF	15	Marwan Mabrouk		(substituted off) 54'
MF	17	Walid El Khatroushi		(substituted off) 60'
MF	6	Muhammad al Sanaani		(substituted off) 75'
FW	19	Ahmed Zuway
Substitutions:
FW	20	Ihaab Boussefi		(substituted on) 54'
MF	8	Abdallah Sharif	(yellow card) 90+3'	(substituted on) 60'
MF	16	Abubakr al Abaidy	(yellow card) 82'	(substituted on) 75'
Manager:
(Brazil) Marcos Paqueta

Assistant referees:
Songuifolo Yeo (Ivory Coast)
Jason Damoo (Seychelles)
Fourth official:
Khalid Abdel Rahman (Sudan)

== Senegal vs. Zambia ==
21 January 2012
22:00

Senegal	1–2	Zambia
N'Doye 73'	Report	Mayuka 12'; Kalaba 20'

Estadio de Bata, Bata
Attendance: 17,500
Referee: Néant Alioum (Cameroon)

Senegal	Zambia

GK	1	Bouna Coundoul
DF	5	Souleymane Diawara
DF	18	Guirane N'Daw	(yellow card) 35'
DF	6	Kader Mangane
DF	3	Ludovic Sané
MF	22	Cheikh M'Bengue
MF	2	Rémi Gomis		(substituted off) 27'
MF	21	Mohamed Diamé
FW	7	Moussa Sow		(substituted off) 66'
FW	8	Mamadou Niang (c)		(substituted off) 46'
FW	19	Demba Ba
Substitutions:
FW	11	Dame N'Doye		(substituted on) 27'
MF	10	Issiar Dia		(substituted on) 46'
FW	15	Papiss Cissé		(substituted on) 66'
Manager:
Amara Traoré

GK	16	Kennedy Mweene	(yellow card) 44'
DF	5	Hijani Himoonde
DF	2	Francis Kasonde
DF	4	Joseph Musonda		(substituted off) 86'
DF	13	Stophira Sunzu
MF	8	Isaac Chansa		(substituted off) 70'
MF	17	Rainford Kalaba
MF	19	Nathan Sinkala
FW	11	Christopher Katongo (c)
FW	20	Emmanuel Mayuka		(substituted off) 81'
FW	3	Chisamba Lungu
Substitutions:
DF	23	Nyambe Mulenga		(substituted on) 70'
MF	14	Noah Chivuta		(substituted on) 81'
FW	12	James Chamanga		(substituted on) 86'
Manager:
(France) Hervé Renard

Assistant referees:
Evarist Menkouande (Cameroon)
Yanoussa Moussa (Cameroon)
Fourth official:
Ali Lemghaifry (Mauritania)

== Libya vs. Zambia ==
25 January 2012
18:15 (Note: Original kick-off at 17:00 but was delayed due to heavy rain.)

Libya	2–2	Zambia
Saad 5', 48'	Report	Mayuka 29'; C. Katongo 54'

Estadio de Bata, Bata
Attendance: 1,500
Referee: Koman Coulibaly (Mali)

Libya	Zambia

GK	1	Samir Aboud (c)
DF	5	Younes Al Shibani
DF	11	Muhammad al Maghrabi
DF	14	Ali Salama
DF	17	Walid El-Khatroushi	(substituted off) 18'
MF	10	Ahmed Saad Osman
MF	23	Djamal Mahamat
MF	2	Rabea Al-Laafi	(substituted off) 77'
MF	16	Abubakr al Abaidy	(substituted off) 72'
FW	6	Muhammad al Sanaani
FW	19	Ahmed Zuway
Substitutions:
FW	20	Ihaab Boussefi	(substituted on) 18'
DF	3	Abdulaziz Belraysh	(substituted on) 72'
MF	8	Abdallah Sharif	(substituted on) 77'
Manager:
(Brazil) Marcos Paqueta

GK	16	Kennedy Mweene
DF	5	Hijani Himoonde
DF	2	Francis Kasonde		(substituted off) 31'
DF	4	Joseph Musonda
DF	13	Stophira Sunzu
MF	8	Isaac Chansa
MF	17	Rainford Kalaba
MF	19	Nathan Sinkala
MF	11	Christopher Katongo (c)
FW	20	Emmanuel Mayuka	(yellow card) 25'
FW	3	Chisamba Lungu		(substituted off) 53'
Substitutions:
FW	9	Collins Mbesuma	(substituted on) 31'	(substituted off) 74'
DF	6	Davies Nkausu		(substituted on) 53'
MF	10	Felix Katongo		(substituted on) 74'
Manager:
(France) Hervé Renard

Assistant referees:
Balla Diarra (Mali)
Richard Bouende-Malonga (Congo)
Fourth official:
Rajindraparsad Seechurn (Mauritius)

== Equatorial Guinea vs. Senegal ==
25 January 2012
21:15 (Note: Original kick-off at 20:00 but was pushed back due to the delay of the Libya–Zambia match.)

Equatorial Guinea	2–1	Senegal
Randy 61'; Kily 90+3'	Report	Sow 89'

Estadio de Bata, Bata
Attendance: 35,000
Referee: Khalid Abdel Rahman (Sudan)

Equatorial Guinea	Senegal

GK	1	Danilo	(yellow card) 42'
DF	3	Kily	(yellow card) 90+4'
DF	15	Lawrence Doe	(yellow card) 90+5' (yellow-red card) 90+5'
DF	4	Rui
DF	5	Fousseny Kamissoko
MF	14	Ben Konaté
MF	6	Juvenal (c)
FW	11	Javier Balboa
FW	12	Thierry Fidjeu		(substituted off) 78'
FW	10	Iván Bolado		(substituted off) 46'
FW	8	Randy	(yellow card) 11'
Substitutions:
MF	17	Narcisse Ekanga		(substituted on) 46'
MF	20	Daniel Ekedo	(yellow card) 89'	(substituted on) 78'
Manager:
(Brazil) Gílson Paulo

GK	1	Bouna Coundoul
DF	5	Souleymane Diawara
DF	18	Guirane N'Daw
DF	6	Kader Mangane (c)
DF	3	Ludovic Sané
MF	22	Cheikh M'Bengue
MF	10	Issiar Dia	(substituted off) 71'
MF	21	Mohamed Diamé	(substituted off) 66'
MF	19	Demba Ba	(substituted off) 58'
FW	11	Dame N'Doye
FW	15	Papiss Cissé
Substitutions:
MF	14	Deme N'Diaye	(substituted on) 58'
FW	7	Moussa Sow	(substituted on) 66'
FW	8	Mamadou Niang	(substituted on) 71'
Manager:
Amara Traoré

Assistant referees:
Moffat Champiti (Malawi)
Jean-Claude Birumushahu (Burundi)
Fourth official:
Mohamed Benouza (Algeria)

== Equatorial Guinea vs. Zambia ==
29 January 2012
19:00

Equatorial Guinea	0–1	Zambia
	Report	C. Katongo 68'

Estadio de Malabo, Malabo
Attendance: 44,000
Referee: Mohamed Benouza (Algeria)

Equatorial Guinea	Zambia

GK	1	Danilo
DF	2	Dani Evuy
DF	4	Rui
DF	5	Fousseny Kamissoko
DF	23	Colin
MF	11	Javier Balboa
MF	14	Ben Konaté	(substituted off) 85'
MF	6	Juvenal (c)
MF	20	Daniel Ekedo
FW	10	Iván Bolado	(substituted off) 76'
FW	12	Thierry Fidjeu	(substituted off) 46'
Substitutions:
FW	19	Raúl Fabiani	(substituted on) 46'
MF	18	Viera Ellong	(substituted on) 76'
MF	7	Rolan de la Cruz	(substituted on) 85'
Manager:
(Brazil) Gílson Paulo

GK	16	Kennedy Mweene
DF	5	Hijani Himoonde
DF	4	Joseph Musonda
DF	13	Stophira Sunzu
DF	6	Davies Nkausu
MF	8	Isaac Chansa	(substituted off) 74'
MF	17	Rainford Kalaba	(substituted off) 90+2'
MF	19	Nathan Sinkala
MF	11	Christopher Katongo (c)
FW	20	Emmanuel Mayuka	(substituted off) 81'
FW	3	Chisamba Lungu
Substitutions:
DF	2	Francis Kasonde	(substituted on) 74'
FW	12	James Chamanga	(substituted on) 81'
MF	7	Clifford Mulenga	(substituted on) 90+2'
Manager:
(France) Hervé Renard

Assistant referees:
Redouane Achik (Morocco)
Aboubacar Doumbouya (Guinea)
Fourth official:
Gehad Grisha (Egypt)

== Libya vs. Senegal ==
29 January 2012
19:00

Libya	2–1	Senegal
Boussefi 5', 84'	Report	D. N'Diaye 10'

Estadio de Bata, Bata
Attendance: 10,000
Referee: Rajindraparsad Seechurn (Mauritius)

Libya	Senegal

GK	1	Samir Aboud (c)
DF	5	Younes Al-Shibani
DF	11	Muhammad Al-Maghrabi	(yellow card) 44'
DF	3	Abdulaziz Belraysh		(substituted off) 67'
DF	14	Ali Salama
MF	10	Ahmed Saad Osman
MF	23	Djamal Mahamat
MF	16	Abubakr Al-Abaidy		(substituted off) 61'
MF	6	Mohamed Esnani		(substituted off) 58'
FW	19	Ahmed Zuway
FW	20	Ihaab Boussefi
Substitutions:
MF	15	Marwan Mabrouk		(substituted on) 58'
MF	8	Abdallah Sharif		(substituted on) 61'
DF	2	Rabea Al-Laafi		(substituted on) 67'
Manager:
(Brazil) Marcos Paqueta

GK	16	Khadim N'Diaye
DF	4	Pape Diakhaté
DF	5	Souleymane Diawara
DF	17	Omar Daf	(yellow card) 12'
DF	6	Kader Mangane	(yellow card) 39'
MF	22	Cheikh M'Bengue
MF	14	Deme N'Diaye	(yellow card) 53'	(substituted off) 74'
MF	21	Mohamed Diamé
MF	9	Souleymane Camara
FW	8	Mamadou Niang (c)		(substituted off) 66'
FW	19	Demba Ba		(substituted off) 46'
Substitutions:
FW	15	Papiss Cissé		(substituted on) 46'
FW	7	Moussa Sow		(substituted on) 66'
MF	10	Issiar Dia		(substituted on) 74'
Manager:
Amara Traoré

Assistant referees:
Peter Edibe (Nigeria)
David Shaanika (Namibia)
Fourth official:
Ali Lemghaifry (Mauritania)
