= 2012 Africa Cup of Nations final =

Football match held in Gabon

- Event: 2012 Africa Cup of Nations
Zambia	Ivory Coast
(Zambia)	(Ivory Coast)
0	0
- After extra time Zambia won 8–7 on penalties
- Date: 12 February 2012
- Venue: Stade d'Angondjé, Libreville
- Referee: Badara Diatta (Senegal)
- Attendance: 40,000
- Weather: Mostly cloudy 25 °C (77 °F)

The 2012 Africa Cup of Nations final was a football match that took place on 12 February 2012 between Zambia and Ivory Coast. The match took place at the Stade d'Angondjé in Libreville, Gabon, to determine the winner of the 2012 Africa Cup of Nations, the football championship of Africa organized by the Confederation of African Football (CAF). This match was an emotional match for Zambia, as the stadium is located near the spot where most of the Zambian national team died when their aeroplane crashed in 1993. The kickoff time was delayed by 30 minutes to 20:30.

Zambia won the title for the first time by beating Ivory Coast 8–7 on penalties after the only goalless draw in the entire tournament.

== Background ==
This was the third appearance in the final for Zambia; the "Copper Bullets" lost in 1974 and 1994. After a surprising start and a win over Senegal, they drew with Libya before winning the deciding match against the host Equatorial Guinea and winning the group. In the quarterfinals they won 3–0 against Sudan and shocked Ghana as they defeated them 1–0 in the semifinals. Both Christopher Katongo and Emmanuel Mayuka scored three goals in the first five matches to help Zambia to reach the final. The match was an emotional one for Zambia, as the stadium in Libreville was just kilometres away from the site of the 1993 Zambia national football team air disaster, in which 18 players were killed.

Ivory Coast also appeared in their third final. They won it in 1992 and lost in 2006. The "Elephants" had gone through the tournament so far without conceding a goal and winning all of their matches. It started with a victory against Sudan, followed by two wins against Burkina Faso and Angola, the latter one without some of the best players. The quarterfinal was won against co-host Equatorial Guinea, before Mali was beaten 1–0. Didier Drogba joins Katongo and Mayuka with three goals himself at the top of the goalscorers.

== Route to the final ==
Zambia
Round
Ivory Coast
Opponent
Result
Group stage
Opponent
Result
Senegal
2–1
Match 1
Sudan
1–0
Libya
2–2
Match 2
Burkina Faso
2–0
Equatorial Guinea
1–0
Match 3
Angola
2–0

Pos	Team	Pld	W	D	L	GF	GA	GD	Pts	Qualification
1	Zambia	3	2	1	0	5	3	+2	7	Advance to knockout stage
2	Equatorial Guinea (H)	3	2	0	1	3	2	+1	6	Advance to knockout stage
3	Libya	3	1	1	1	4	4	0	4	
4	Senegal	3	0	0	3	3	6	−3	0	

Source: CAF
(H) Hosts
Final standing

Pos	Team	Pld	W	D	L	GF	GA	GD	Pts	Qualification
1	Ivory Coast	3	3	0	0	5	0	+5	9	Advance to knockout stage
2	Sudan	3	1	1	1	4	4	0	4	Advance to knockout stage
3	Angola	3	1	1	1	4	5	−1	4	
4	Burkina Faso	3	0	0	3	2	6	−4	0	

Source: CAF
Opponent
Result
Knockout stage
Opponent
Result
Sudan
3–0
Quarterfinals
Equatorial Guinea
3–0
Ghana
1–0
Semifinals
Mali
1–0

== Match details ==
=== Details ===
12 February 2012
20:30 UTC+1

Zambia	0–0 (a.e.t.)	Ivory Coast
	Report
Penalties
C. Katongo (penalty scored); Mayuka (penalty scored); Chansa (penalty scored); F. Katongo (penalty scored); Mweene (penalty scored); Sinkala (penalty scored); Lungu (penalty scored); Kalaba (penalty missed); Sunzu (penalty scored)	8–7	(penalty scored) Tioté; (penalty scored) Bony; (penalty scored) Bamba; (penalty scored) Gradel; (penalty scored) Drogba; (penalty scored) Tiéné; (penalty scored) Ya Konan; (penalty missed) K. Touré; (penalty missed) Gervinho

Stade d'Angondjé, Libreville
Attendance: 40,000
Referee: Badara Diatta (Senegal)

Zambia	Ivory Coast

GK	16	Kennedy Mweene
RB	6	Davies Nkausu
CB	13	Stophira Sunzu
CB	5	Hijani Himoonde
LB	4	Joseph Musonda		(substituted off) 12'
RM	20	Emmanuel Mayuka
CM	8	Isaac Chansa
CM	19	Nathan Sinkala
LM	17	Rainford Kalaba
SS	3	Chisamba Lungu
CF	11	Christopher Katongo (c)
Substitutions:
DF	23	Nyambe Mulenga	(yellow card) 69'	(substituted on) 12'	(substituted off) 74'
MF	10	Felix Katongo			(substituted on) 74'
Manager:
(France) Hervé Renard

GK	1	Boubacar Barry
RB	6	Jean-Jacques Gosso
CB	4	Kolo Touré
CB	22	Sol Bamba	(yellow card) 66'
LB	17	Siaka Tiéné
RM	5	Didier Zokora		(substituted off) 75'
CM	19	Yaya Touré		(substituted off) 87'
LM	9	Cheick Tioté	(yellow card) 63'
AM	10	Gervinho
AM	8	Salomon Kalou		(substituted off) 63'
CF	11	Didier Drogba (c)
Substitutions:
MF	15	Max Gradel		(substituted on) 63'
MF	13	Didier Ya Konan		(substituted on) 75'
FW	12	Wilfried Bony		(substituted on) 87'
Manager:
(Ivory Coast) François Zahoui

Assistant referees:
Bechir Hassani (Tunisia)
Evarist Menkouande (Cameroon)
Fourth official:
Eddy Maillet (Seychelles)
