= 2010 Libyan Super Cup =

Ittihad	Nasr
3	0
- Date: 6 August 2010
- Venue: 11 June Stadium, Tripoli
- Man of the Match: Sapol Mani (Ittihad)
- Referee: Muhammad Za'alouq
- Weather: 26°C, clear, 58% humidity

The 2010 Libyan Super Cup was the 14th edition of the Libyan Super Cup, an annual football match contested by the winners of the previous year's Libyan Premier League and Libyan Cup competitions. The match took place on August 6, 2010 at the 11 June Stadium in the capital, Tripoli, contested by league champions Ittihad Tripoli, seeking an eighth successive title, and cup winners Nasr.

Ittihad beat Nasr 3–0.

== Match details ==
6 August 2010
20:30 EET

Ittihad	3 – 0	Nasr
Kamilou 5'; Sapol 57'; Shaban 69' (pen.)	Report

11 June Stadium, Tripoli
Referee: Muhammad Za'alouq

ITTIHAD:
GK	1	(Libya) Samir Aboud (c)
RB	17	(Tunisia) Maher Hannachi
CB	6	(Libya) Younes Shibani	(yellow card) 14'
CB	13	(Morocco) Hameed Boujjar
LB	15	(Libya) Hesham Shaban
DM	18	(Libya) Abdulnaser Salil	(yellow card) 54'
CM	16	(Libya) Marwan Mabrouk	(yellow card) 16'
CM	28	(Togo) Sapol Mani
RW	19	(Libya) Ahmed Zuway		(substituted off) 77'
CF	10	(Libya) Muhammad Za'abia		(substituted off) 77'
LF	25	(Niger) Daouda Kamilou		(substituted off) 64'
Substitutes:
LW	14	(Libya) Ali Rahuma		(substituted on) 64'
FW	9	(Libya) Ahmed al Masly		(substituted on) 77'
DF	22	(Libya) Ossama Chtiba	(yellow card) 83'	(substituted on) 77'
Manager:
(Egypt) Anwar Salama

NASR:
GK	1	(Libya) Salah al Fitouri	(yellow card) 45+1' (red card) 66'
RB	15	(Libya) Ali al Haasy
CB	4	(Libya) Younes al Jaraari
CB	5	(Libya) Snousi al Qata'ani
LB	2	(Libya) Abdelhakeem al Mehdi	(yellow card) 80'
CM	16	(Libya) Abubakr al Abaidy	(yellow card) 75'
CM	8	(Libya) Khaled Hussein (c)
CM	6	(Libya) Sa'ad al Zayyani
RW	18	(Libya) Ahmed al Abaidy
CF	27	(Libya) Saami Sa'eed		(substituted off) 68'
LW	22	(Libya) Ibrahim al Haasy		(substituted off) 78'
Substitutes:
GK	12	(Libya) Muhammad al Jehani		(substituted on) 68'
DF	26	(Libya) Abdelhaadi Zaidan		(substituted on) 78'
Manager:
(Tunisia) Muhammad Hamza

== See also ==
- 2009–10 Libyan Premier League
- 2009–10 Libyan Cup
