= 2010 Libyan Cup final =

- Event: 2009–10 Libyan Cup
Madina	Nasr
1	2
- Date: 10 June 2010
- Venue: 11 June Stadium, Tripoli
- Man of the Match: Effosa Eguakon (Nasr)
- Referee: Muhammad Mehraz
- Weather: 39 °C, Sunny, Clear

The 2010 Libyan Cup final was the 20th final of the premier cup competition in the Libyan Arab Jamahiriya, the Libyan Cup. The match took place on June 10, 2010, at the 11 June Stadium in Tripoli. The match was contested by 2008 runners-up Madina and 2003 winners Nasr.

Both sides entered the final looking to end respective droughts without major silverware; Madina had not won a major title since their 2001 League-Supercup double, and Nasr had not won a major trophy since winning this competition in 2002–03.

After a fairly poor first half, the game sprung into life just past the hour when defender Abubakr al Abaidy gave the Benghazi outfit the lead, chesting Mehdi ben Dhifallah's knockdown and volleying past Osama al Snousi. They were in front for just under four minutes as Guinean midfielder Ismail Bangoura lashed Efosa Francis' pullback into the top corner and equalised for Madina. With time running out and the game in the balance, striker Ihaab Bouseffi did a one-two with Ndubuisi Eze and the 24-year-old cracked a low drive into the bottom corner in the 89th minute.

The title was Nasr manager Jamaal Bounawaara's (their fourth manager of 2009–10) second Libyan Cup title as a manager, following two cup wins with Ahly Tripoli in his playing career, after defeating Ittihad on penalties in 2002 with Hilal. The win also means Nasr won qualification for the 2011 CAF Confederation Cup.

== Background ==
Up until the 2010 final, Madina had appeared in three previous finals (1977, 2001 & 2008), winning one of them. They also had two unofficial titles to their name, by virtue of finishing second in the domestic league, (as there was no domestic cup competition organised at this time, the runner-up in the league was unofficially proclaimed Libyan Cup champion and earned a place in the African Cup Winners Cup) in 1987 and 1990. Nasr had appeared in two finals (1997 & 2003), winning both. They also had two unofficial titles (1978, 1984) by virtue of finishing runners-up.

In the two meetings between the sides in the league that season, they drew 2–2 in Tripoli, with Nasr winning the return fixture 3–1 at the Martyrs of February Stadium. The sides had also met in a two-legged League Cup semi-final; Nasr lost the first leg 1–3 at home, before a 1–1 stalemate in Tripoli saw Madina through to the final.

The previous and only encounter between these sides in the cup was in the 2007–08 season, where Madina defeated Nasr 2–0 in the semi-finals, before going on to lose to Khaleej Sirte.

== Route to the final ==
Madina		Round	Nasr	
Olomby [LPL] A 0–0 (4–3 pens.)	–	Round of 32	Reef [LSD] H 3–1	Eze 23', 43', Sa'eed 73'
Akhdar [LPL] H 3–1	de Paul 44' (pen.), Mqarej 68', Sharif 82'	Round of 16	Khaleej Sirte [LPL] H 1–0	Eze 59' (pen.)
Ahly Tripoli [LPL] A 2–0^{1}	–	Quarter Final	Wefaq Sabratha [LSD] A 0–0 (5–4 pens.)	–
Hiyad [LSD] A 4–1	Mqarej 37' (pen.), Sanosar 41', 49', Muftaah 44'	Semi Final	Benghazi al Jadeeda [LSD] A 3–1	Eze 31', Ben Dhifallah 41', 88'

^{1} Madina awarded 2–0 victory after Ahly Tripoli withdrew from the competition.
[LPL] = Libyan Premier League
[LSD] = Libyan Second Division

== Match ==
=== Details ===
10 June 2010
19:30 EET

Madina	1 – 2	Nasr
Ismail Bangoura 66'	Report (in Arabic)	Abubakr al Abaidy 62'; Ihaab Bouseffi 89'

11 June Stadium, Tripoli
Referee: Muhammad Mehraz

== See also ==
- 2009–10 Libyan Cup
- 2010 Libyan League Cup Final
