= 2009–10 Libyan Cup =

Association football championship in Libya

The 2009–10 Libyan Cup was the 20th edition of the competition since its inception in 1976. Nasr secured their third title, defeating Madina 2–1 in a close final at the 11 June Stadium.

== Round of 32 ==
The Round of 32 for the 2009–10 Libyan Cup consists of the 14 Libyan Premier League clubs, in addition to the 18 who qualified from the previous rounds. The draw was conducted on Thursday, January 7 at LFF headquarters in Tripoli. The dates and times for the matches were decided as follows:

January 18, 2010	Ansaar	0–5	Akhdar	Bayda
15:00			Weka; Ahmed al Sagheer; Wisaam Boukteaf; Abdelhamid al Zidane	Stadium: Green Document Stadium

January 18, 2010	Nasr	3–1	Reef	Benina
15:00	Ndubuisi Eze 23', 43'; Saami Sa'eed 73'		Mohammad Yahya 45+1'	Stadium: Martyrs of February Stadium

January 18, 2010	Hiyad	6–0	Hadaf	Misrata
15:00				Stadium: July 9 Stadium

January 18, 2010	Olomby	0 – 0 (3 – 4 pens.)	Madina	Zawiya
15:00				Stadium: Zaawia Stadium

January 18, 2010	Tersanah	1–2	Mahalla	Tripoli
17:00	Ahmed Musbaah 50'		Na'eem Lutfi 28'; Haani Sharif 45'	Stadium: GMR Stadium

January 19, 2010	Rafik Sorman	2–0	Sweahly	Zawiya
15:00	Waleed Abdelmajid 40'			Stadium: Zaawia Stadium

January 19, 2010	Khaleej Sirte	6–0	Nojom Ajdabiya	Sirte
15:00				Stadium: Sirte Stadium

January 19, 2010	Mukhtar Tobruk	0–1	Suqoor	Tobruk
15:00				Stadium: Tobruk Stadium

January 19, 2010	Afriqi	0 – 0 (3 – 5 pens.)	Benghazi al Jadeeda	Derna
15:00				Stadium: Derna Stadium

January 19, 2010	Wefaq Sabratha	2–1	Mahdeeya	Sabratha
15:00				Stadium: Sabratha Stadium

January 19, 2010	Ta'awon	0–2	Ahly Tripoli	Ajdabiya
15:00			Mohammad al Tijani 39', 75'; Omar Daoud (penalty missed)	Stadium: March 10 Stadium

January 19, 2010	Al Charara	2–1	Dhahra Tripoli	Sabha
15:00				Stadium: Sabha Stadium

January 19, 2010	Tahaddy	1–0	Andalus	Benina
17:00	Omar al Aalim 78'			Stadium: Martyrs of February Stadium

January 20, 2010	Najma	1–3	Aman al Aam	Benina
15:00				Stadium: Martyrs of February Stadium

January 20, 2010	Al Shat	1 – 1 (6 – 5 pens.)	Ahly Benghazi	Tripoli
17:00	Rasheed al Deasy 45+5'		Ifeanyi Frederick Onuigbo 14'	Stadium: GMR Stadium

January 23, 2010	Hilal	1–3	Ittihad	Benina
15:30	Faisal al Badri 44'		Hisham Sha'abaan 40' (pen.); Ahmed Abdulkafi 76'; Mohammad Za'abia 87' (yellow card) ?' (yellow-red card) 87'	Stadium: Martyrs of February Stadium

== Round of 16 ==
The draw for the Round of 16 of the 2009–10 Libyan Cup was made on January 28, 2010 at 21:30 EET. The dates and times for the 8 ties were confirmed on January 31. Ties are to be played over the period February 7–February 9, 2010. If any of the ties end in a draw after 90 minutes, then the tie goes immediately to a penalty shootout.

== Ties ==
All times local (EET)

February 7, 2010	Wefaq Sabratha	0 – 0 (3 – 2 pens.)	Rafik Sorman	Sabratha
15:00				Stadium: Sabratha Stadium

February 7, 2010	Ahly Tripoli	1 – 0	Al Shat	Tripoli
17:00	Mohammad al Maghrabi 84'			Stadium: 11 June Stadium

February 8, 2010	Nasr	1 – 0	Khaleej Sirte	Benina
15:00	Ndubuisi Eze 59' (pen.); Ibrahim al Haasi (red card) 76'		Maher al Naili (red card) 88'	Stadium: Martyrs of February Stadium

February 8, 2010	Aman al Aam	0 – 1	Tahaddy	Tripoli
17:00			Solomonson Ezékoka 45+1' (red card) 86'	Stadium: GMR Stadium

February 8, 2010	Ittihad	1 – 0	Mahalla	Tripoli
17:00	Ahmed Abdulkafi 66'			Stadium: 11 June Stadium

February 9, 2010	Hiyad	2 – 2 (5 – 3 pens.)	Suqoor	Misrata
15:00	Alpha Barry 40', 67'		Mohammad Hadoud 38'; Salem Bazeen 90'	Stadium: 9 July Stadium

February 9, 2010	Benghazi al Jadeeda	1 – 0	Al Charara	Benina
15:00	85'		Sent off (straight red)	Stadium: Martyrs of February Stadium

February 23, 2010	Madina	3 – 1	Akhdar	Tripoli
16:00	Stefan de Paul 44' (pen.); Mohammad Mqarej 68'; Abdallah Sharif 82'; Ismael Bangoura (red card) 55'; Ayman Khalifi (yellow card) 73'		Abdelhameed Zidane 21'; Hishaam Lahmar (yellow card) 66'	Stadium: 11 June Stadium

== Quarter finals ==
3 April 2010
15:00

Wefaq Sabratha	0 – 0	Nasr
Penalties
al Mezoughi (penalty scored); Trabelsi (penalty scored); Karama (penalty scored); Abu Raqiqa (penalty missed) (penalty scored) al Zikri (penalty missed)	4 – 5 Wefaq went first	(penalty scored) Imbarek; (penalty scored) al Zayaani; (penalty scored) Aboud; (penalty scored) al Kakli; (penalty missed) Ben Dhifallah; (penalty scored) al Abaidy

Sabratha Stadium, Sabratha

3 April 2010
17:30

Tahaddy	0 – 0	Hiyad
Penalties
(penalty scored) al Bar'asi (penalty missed); Bhairi (penalty missed) al 'Aalem (penalty scored); Salim (penalty missed); Diakité (penalty missed)	2 – 3 Tahaddy went first	(penalty scored) Tiam; (penalty missed) Abdusalam; (penalty missed) al Hayyim; (penalty missed) Bousharoud; (penalty scored) al Toumi; (penalty scored) al Qaouridi

Martyrs of February Stadium, Benina

May 14, 2010
18:00 GMT

Benghazi al Jadeeda	1 – 1	Ittihad
al Mesmaari 48'		Mhadeb 19'
Penalties
	5 – 3

Martyrs of February Stadium, Benina

Ahly Tripoli	w/o^{1}	Madina

11 June Stadium, Tripoli

^{1} Madina awarded tie, after Ahly Tripoli quit the competition amid protests with the Libyan Football Federation.

== Semi finals ==
Draw made on May 20, at LFF headquarters in Tripoli.

7 June 2010
17:00 EET

Hiyad	1 – 4	Madina
Haitham al Dhaala'a 87'		Muhammad Mqarej 37' (pen.); Camara Sanosar 41', 49'; Mansour Muftaah 44'

9 July Stadium, Misrata

7 June 2010
19:30 EET

Benghazi al Jadeeda	1 – 3	Nasr
Hassan al Mushri 45'		Ndubuisi Eze 31'; Mehdi Ben Dhifallah 41', 88'; Ali al Haasy (penalty missed) 49'

Martyrs of February Stadium, Benina

== Final ==
10 June 2010
19:30 EET

Madina	1 – 2	Nasr
Ismail Bangoura 66'		Abubakr al Abaidy 62'; Ihaab Bouseffi 89'

11 June Stadium, Tripoli
Referee: Muhammad Mehraz
