= CAF Team of the Year =

CAF football award

The CAF Team of the Year is an annual football award given by the Confederation of African Football during the CAF Awards.

In 2007, the CAF did not choose the team of the year, but rather the best ten players of the last fifty years. The ten players chosen were Mahmoud El Khatib and Hossam Hassan of Egypt, Roger Milla and Samuel Eto'o of Cameroon, Abedi Pele of Ghana, Kalusha Bwalya of Zambia, George Weah of Liberia, Rabah Madjer of Algeria, Didier Drogba of the Ivory Coast, and Nwankwo Kanu of Nigeria.

== Team of the year (2005 - present) ==
=== 2005 ===
Goalkeeper	Defenders	Midfielders	Forwards
(Senegal) Tony Sylva	(Tunisia) Hatem Trabelsi (Nigeria) Joseph Yobo (Ivory Coast) Kolo Touré (Mali) Djimi Traoré	(Ivory Coast) Didier Zokora (Ghana) Michael Essien (Nigeria) John Obi Mikel (Egypt) Mohamed Barakat	(Cameroon) Samuel Eto'o (Ivory Coast) Didier Drogba

=== 2006 ===
Goalkeeper	Defenders	Midfielders	Forwards
(Egypt) Essam El Hadary	(Ivory Coast) Emmanuel Eboué (Egypt) Wael Gomaa (Ivory Coast) Kolo Touré (Nigeria) Taye Taiwo	(Ivory Coast) Didier Zokora (Ghana) Michael Essien (Mali) Mahamadou Diarra (Egypt) Mohamed Aboutrika	(Cameroon) Samuel Eto'o (Ivory Coast) Didier Drogba

=== 2008 ===
Goalkeeper	Defenders	Midfielders	Forwards
(Cameroon) Carlos Kameni	(Ghana) John Mensah (Egypt) Wael Gomaa (Nigeria) Joseph Yobo (Nigeria) Taye Taiwo	(Ivory Coast) Yaya Touré (Ghana) Michael Essien (Ghana) Sulley Muntari (Egypt) Mohamed Aboutrika	(Cameroon) Samuel Eto'o (Togo) Emmanuel Adebayor

=== 2009 ===
Goalkeeper	Defenders	Midfielders	Forwards
(Democratic Republic of the Congo) Robert Kidiaba	(Ghana) John Pantsil (Egypt) Wael Gomaa (Cameroon) Alex Song (Algeria) Nadir Belhadj	(Ivory Coast) Yaya Touré (Ghana) Michael Essien (Mali) Seydou Keita	(Cameroon) Samuel Eto'o (Ivory Coast) Didier Drogba (Democratic Republic of the Congo) Trésor Mputu

=== 2010 ===
Goalkeeper	Defenders	Midfielders	Forwards
(Nigeria) Vincent Enyeama	(Egypt) Ahmed Elmohamady (Egypt) Wael Gomaa (Algeria) Madjid Bougherra (Nigeria) Taye Taiwo	(Egypt) Ahmed Hassan (Ghana) Kevin-Prince Boateng (Ghana) André Ayew	(Cameroon) Samuel Eto'o (Ivory Coast) Didier Drogba (Ghana) Asamoah Gyan

=== 2011 ===
Goalkeepers	Defenders	Midfielders	Forwards
(Libya) Samir Aboud	(Ghana) Harrison Afful (Cameroon) Banana Yaya (Morocco) Ayoub El Khaliqi (Nigeria) Taye Taiwo	(Ivory Coast) Yaya Touré (Mali) Seydou Keita (Ghana) Kevin-Prince Boateng (Ghana) André Ayew	(Cameroon) Samuel Eto'o (Senegal) Moussa Sow

=== 2012 ===
Goalkeepers	Defenders	Midfielders	Forwards
(Democratic Republic of the Congo) Lutunu Dulé	(Sudan) Ahmed El-Basha (Tunisia) Walid Hichri (Zambia) Stoppila Sunzu (Egypt) Ahmed Fathy	(Egypt) Mohamed Aboutrika (Ivory Coast) Yaya Touré (Cameroon) Alex Song (Morocco) Younès Belhanda	(Ivory Coast) Didier Drogba (Zambia) Christopher Katongo

=== 2013 ===
Goalkeepers	Defenders	Midfielders	Forwards
(Nigeria) Vincent Enyeama	(Egypt) Ahmed Fathy (Morocco) Medhi Benatia (Guinea) Kévin Constant	(Burkina Faso) Jonathan Pitroipa (Nigeria) John Obi Mikel (Ivory Coast) Yaya Touré (Egypt) Mohamed Aboutrika	(Nigeria) Emmanuel Emenike (Ghana) Asamoah Gyan (Gabon) Pierre-Emerick Aubameyang

=== 2014 ===
Goalkeeper	Defenders	Midfielders	Forwards
(Nigeria) Vincent Enyeama	(Democratic Republic of the Congo) Jean Kasusula (Morocco) Medhi Benatia (Cameroon) Stéphane Mbia (Ghana) Kwadwo Asamoah	(Ivory Coast) Yaya Touré (Algeria) Yacine Brahimi (Tunisia) Fakhreddine Ben Youssef	(Gabon) Pierre-Emerick Aubameyang (Ghana) Asamoah Gyan (Nigeria) Ahmed Musa

=== 2015 ===
Goalkeeper	Defenders	Midfielders	Forwards
(Democratic Republic of the Congo) Robert Kidiaba	(Ivory Coast) Serge Aurier (Morocco) Medhi Benatia (Algeria) Mohamed Rabie Meftah	(Ivory Coast) Yaya Touré (Algeria) Yacine Brahimi (Senegal) Sadio Mané (Ghana) André Ayew	(Gabon) Pierre-Emerick Aubameyang (Tanzania) Mbwana Samatta (Algeria) Baghdad Bounedjah

Substitutes

Player
(Mali) Djigui Diarra
(Nigeria) Azubuike Okechukwu
(Nigeria) Kelechi Nwakali
(Algeria) Zinedine Ferhat
(Mali) Adama Traoré
(Nigeria) Victor Osimhen
(South Africa) Kermit Erasmus

=== 2016 ===
Goalkeeper	Defenders	Midfielders	Forwards
(Uganda) Denis Onyango	(Ivory Coast) Serge Aurier (Tunisia) Aymen Abdennour (Ivory Coast) Eric Bailly (Democratic Republic of the Congo) Joyce Lomalisa	(Zimbabwe) Khama Billiat (Zambia) Rainford Kalaba (South Africa) Keagan Dolly	(Gabon) Pierre-Emerick Aubameyang (Senegal) Sadio Mané (Algeria) Riyad Mahrez

Substitutes

Player
(Tunisia) Aymen Mathlouthi
(Senegal) Kalidou Koulibaly
(Mali) Salif Coulibaly
(Algeria) Islam Slimani
(Egypt) Mohamed Salah
(Nigeria) Kelechi Iheanacho
(Nigeria) Alex Iwobi

=== 2017 ===
Goalkeeper	Defenders	Midfielders	Forwards
(Tunisia) Aymen Mathlouthi	(Egypt) Ahmed Fathy (Ivory Coast) Eric Bailly (Tunisia) Ali Maâloul	(Morocco) Mohamed Ounajem (Morocco) Karim El Ahmadi (Nigeria) Junior Ajayi (Morocco) Achraf Bencharki	(Morocco) Khalid Boutaïb (Tunisia) Taha Yassine Khenissi (Egypt) Mohamed Salah

=== 2018 ===
Goalkeeper	Defenders	Midfielders	Forwards
(Uganda) Denis Onyango	(Ivory Coast) Serge Aurier (Senegal) Kalidou Koulibaly (Ivory Coast) Eric Bailly (Morocco) Medhi Benatia	(Guinea) Naby Keïta (Ghana) Thomas Partey (Algeria) Riyad Mahrez	(Gabon) Pierre-Emerick Aubameyang (Senegal) Sadio Mané (Egypt) Mohamed Salah

=== 2019 ===
Goalkeeper	Defenders	Midfielders	Forwards
(Cameroon) André Onana	(Ivory Coast) Serge Aurier (Cameroon) Joël Matip (Senegal) Kalidou Koulibaly (Morocco) Achraf Hakimi	(Senegal) Idrissa Gueye (Algeria) Riyad Mahrez (Morocco) Hakim Ziyech	(Egypt) Mohamed Salah (Gabon) Pierre-Emerick Aubameyang (Senegal) Sadio Mané

=== 2023 ===
==== Men's XI ====
Goalkeeper	Defenders	Midfielders	Forwards
(Cameroon) André Onana	(Democratic Republic of the Congo) Chancel Mbemba (Senegal) Kalidou Koulibaly (Morocco) Achraf Hakimi	(Morocco) Sofyan Amrabat (Ghana) Mohammed Kudus (Cameroon) André-Frank Zambo Anguissa (Ghana) Thomas Partey	(Senegal) Sadio Mané (Nigeria) Victor Osimhen (Egypt) Mohamed Salah

==== Women's XI ====
Goalkeeper	Defenders	Midfielders	Forwards
(South Africa) Andile Dlamini	(South Africa) Bambanani Mbane (South Africa) Lebohang Ramalepe (Nigeria) Michelle Alozie (Nigeria) Osinachi Ohale	(Morocco) Fatima Tagnaout (South Africa) Linda Motlhalo (South Africa) Refiloe Jane	(Nigeria) Asisat Oshoala (Zambia) Barbra Banda (Malawi) Tabitha Chawinga

=== 2024 ===
==== Men's XI ====
Goalkeeper	Defenders	Midfielders	Forwards
(Cameroon) André Onana	(Democratic Republic of the Congo) Chancel Mbemba (Senegal) Kalidou Koulibaly (Morocco) Achraf Hakimi	(Mali) Yves Bissouma (Ivory Coast) Franck Kessié (Morocco) Sofyan Amrabat (Ghana) Mohammed Kudus	(Nigeria) Ademola Lookman (Nigeria) Victor Osimhen (Egypt) Mohamed Salah

==== Women's XI ====
Goalkeeper	Defenders	Midfielders	Forwards
(South Africa) Andile Dlamini	(Nigeria) Michelle Alozie (South Africa) Karabo Dhlamini (Nigeria) Osinachi Ohale	(Nigeria) Rasheedat Ajibade (South Africa) Linda Motlhalo (South Africa) Lebogang Ramalepe (Morocco) Ghizlane Chebbak	(Malawi) Tabitha Chawinga (Nigeria) Asisat Oshoala (Zambia) Barbra Banda

== Most appearances ==
Player	No. of appearances	Years
(Ivory Coast) Yaya Touré	7	2008, 2009, 2011, 2012, 2013, 2014, 2015
(Cameroon) Samuel Eto'o	6	2005, 2006, 2008, 2009, 2010, 2011
(Gabon) Pierre-Emerick Aubameyang	6	2013, 2014, 2015, 2016, 2018, 2019
(Ivory Coast) Didier Drogba	5	2005, 2006, 2009, 2010, 2012
(Senegal) Sadio Mané	5	2015, 2016, 2018, 2019, 2023
(Egypt) Mohamed Salah	5	2017, 2018, 2019, 2023, 2024
(Nigeria) Taye Taiwo	4	2006, 2008, 2010, 2011
(Egypt) Wael Gomaa	4	2006, 2008, 2009, 2010
(Ivory Coast) Serge Aurier	4	2015, 2016, 2018, 2019
(Egypt) Mohamed Aboutrika	4	2006, 2008, 2012, 2013
(Ghana) Michael Essien	4	2005, 2006, 2008, 2009
(Morocco) Medhi Benatia	4	2013, 2014, 2015, 2018
(Senegal) Kalidou Koulibaly	4	2018, 2019, 2023, 2024
(Nigeria) Vincent Enyeama	3	2010, 2013, 2014
(Ivory Coast) Eric Bailly	3	2016, 2017, 2018
(Algeria) Riyad Mahrez	3	2016, 2018, 2019
(Morocco) Achraf Hakimi	3	2019, 2023, 2024
(Cameroon) André Onana	3	2019, 2023, 2024
(Egypt) Ahmed Fathy	3	2012, 2013, 2017
