= Davies Nkausu =

Zambian footballer (born 1986)

Personal information
- Date of birth: 1 January 1986 (age 40)
- Place of birth: Lusaka, Zambia
- Height: 1.73 m (5 ft 8 in)
- Position: Defender

Youth career
- 2002–2003: Chiparamba Great Eagles

Senior career*
Years	Team	Apps	(Gls)
2003–2008	Pretoria University	101	(4)
2008–2014	SuperSport United	41	(0)
2014–2015	Bloemfontein Celtic	19	(0)
2015–2017	Free State Stars	22	(0)
2017–2018	University of Pretoria	17	(0)
2018–2019	Baroka	0	(0)

International career
2002	Zambia U-17		
2003–04	Zambia U-20		
2007	Zambia U-23		
2008–2016	Zambia	32	(0)
- * Club domestic league appearances and goals as of 1 May 2023

Davies Nkausu (born 1 January 1986) is a Zambian professional footballer who played as a defender in South Africa.

Born in Lusaka and playing for the Zambia national football team, Nkausu has spent all of his club career in South Africa.

Nkausu played youth football for Chiparamba Great Eagles before joining Pretoria University FC in 2003, and has also represented Zambia internationally at various youth levels, including captaining the country's under-20 team, before graduating to the senior side in 2008.

== Club career ==
=== Chiparamba Great Eagles ===
"The boys have been with the U-17 and U-19 teams, they have been outgoing and accepted into the group. The experience and the exposure they are getting is wonderful and I don't think they'll be the same when they return to Zambia. They have had conversations with Roy Keane and Ole Solskjaer over lunch."

— Chiparamba academy director Nenani Banda, on Nkausu and Yobe's trial with Manchester United.

Nkausu was born in Lusaka, Zambia. He began his career with Chiparamba in his native Zambia in 2002. In March 2003, Nkausu and Chiparamba teammate Dominic Yobe went on trial at English club Manchester United after being discovered by United's African scout Frank Lord, who visited Zambia in 2002. The duo became the first Zambian players to be involved with the club. The pair spent two weeks on trial, meeting first-team stars such as Phil Neville, Roy Keane and Ole Gunnar Solskjaer as well as manager Sir Alex Ferguson. However, nothing came of the trial and Nkausu returned to Chiparamba.

Reflecting on the trial in May 2012, following Ferguson's retirement, Nkausu claimed that the legendary manager had likened him to then-Arsenal midfielder Patrick Vieira. He added that Ferguson's encouragement had given the defender the "belief that I [could] make it in football" and admitted, "if I look back, I regret not signing and staying at Old Trafford."

=== Pretoria University ===
Seven months after the trial with Manchester United, Nkausu left Zambia for South African National First Division club Pretoria University, with the transfer being completed on 6 October 2003. He broke into the club's first team in the 2004–05 season, playing in twenty-nine of Pretoria's thirty-four games. Pretoria finished twelfth in 2004–05. In 2005–06 Davies again made twenty-nine league appearances, but this time he also scored one goal. Pretoria finished in eleventh place, and Nkausu was almost ever-present in their thirty National First Division games. Nkausu played a reduced twenty-six games in the 2006–07 season, but he scored a personal season record of three goals, which helped propel Pretoria University to a third-placed finish and a promotion playoff. Pretoria defeated Winners Park on away goals but were beaten in the playoff final by AmaZulu. Davies played fewer games still in 2007–08, making seventeen appearances as Pretoria slumped to a seventh-placed finish in the newly implemented Inland Stream. The decrease in Pretoria's fortunes caused Nkausu to move to SuperSport United, who had just won the Premier Soccer League (PSL) and were therefore considered one of the best teams in South Africa.

=== SuperSport United ===
Nkausu moved to SuperSport United ahead of the 2008–09 season. He had made a big leap from the lower reaches of the second division to the top of the first, and predictably made just five appearances in his debut season with the club, making his debut in the 1–0 win over Free State Stars on 30 August 2008. However, he still collected a winner's medal as SuperSport claimed a second consecutive Premier Soccer League title. Nkausu only made three appearances the following season, playing in SuperSport's victories over Free State Stars and Santos as well as the 3–0 loss to AmaZulu in March 2010. Again, SuperSport won the league title.

2010–11 was another frustrating season for Nkausu. He was included as a substitute in many of SuperSport's Premier Soccer League games, but was only used in two of them. He made his first appearance of the season against Orlando Pirates on 30 April 2011 in a 1–0 win. His only other appearance in 2010–11 was in the 3–1 victory over Vasco da Gama on 7 May, near the end of the season. On 5 August Nkausu was included in SuperSport's starting line–up for their 2011 MTN 8 quarter–final 5–2 loss to Ajax Cape Town FC. Nkausu conceded a penalty for a foul on Ajax midfielder Khama Billiat, and was later sent off for dissent after disputing the referee's decision. The defeat eliminated SuperSport from the competition.

Part of the reason for this lack of playing time was the problem of Nkausu's South African residence permit, which he became eligible for in 2010 having spent five years in the country. In September 2010, despite agreeing a two–year contract with SuperSport, the club decided to wait until Nkausu's permit was granted until registering him, due to the PSL's limit on foreign players. Nkausu said "I have signed a new two-year contract here but the condition is that it will become effective the moment I can be registered as a non-foreign player, that is after I get my permanent residency. Right now I am waiting for the papers to be issued so that I can at least start being available for selection because as we speak I am not even registered...Last season I was still registered as a foreigner but this time around I have to be a non-foreigner." Nkausu finally received his residence permit in March 2011, commenting "The paperwork was completed three days ago and I'm just waiting for my Identity Document now. Just when I thought it would not go through, it finally happened". This allowed Nkausu to be considered non–foreign, opening up another foreign space for manager Gavin Hunt.

Nkausu made his first appearance in the 2011–12 Premier Soccer League in SuperSport's 2–0 win against Platinum Stars on 25 September 2011. He then followed this up by playing the full game against Maritzburg United on 14 October 2011, which SuperSport won 7–0. Nkausu had a run of first-team games in November and December 2011, playing six consecutive matches, with SuperSport keeping three clean sheets in this time.

Nkausu featured in SuperSport's 2–1 victory over Mamelodi Sundowns in the semi-final of the Mopani Mayor's Charity Cup on 29 July 2012. On 4 August 2012 the defender helped SuperSport reach the last four of the 2012 MTN 8, playing the full 90 minutes of the club's 2–1 quarter-final win over Free State Stars and captaining SuperSport for the first time. The victory set up a semi-final clash with Orlando Pirates. Nkausu played at centre-back in SuperSport's opening 2012-13 Premier Soccer League fixture, a 1–1 draw with Ajax Cape Town on 10 August 2012. On 19 August 2012 Nkausu played in SuperSport's 0–0 draw with Orlando Pirates in the first leg of their MTN 8 semi-final, making an important block to deny Siyabonga Sangweni in the closing stages. Six days later he played in SuperSport's 3–0 second-leg victory that earned them a place in the MTN 8 final.

The defender assisted Clifford Mulenga for SuperSport's third goal in a 3–0 win over AmaZulu on 15 September 2012 with a long throw-in. On 22 September Nkausu captained SuperSport in their MTN 8 cup final against Moroka Swallows; a 2–1 loss meant Nkausu and his teammates finished as tournament runners-up. An injury sustained in November limited Nkausu's playing time towards the end of 2012, and he missed further league games through his involvement in the 2013 Africa Cup of Nations. Nkausu made his first league appearance for SuperSport for almost two months in the 1–0 loss to Orlando Pirates on 13 February 2013; he conceded a penalty for a foul on Daine Klate, although the tackle actually occurred outside of the penalty area. Nkausu continued to feature sporadically throughout the season, and made 13 league appearances as SuperSport finished sixth. On 25 May 2013, SuperSport reached the Nedbank Cup final, losing 1–0 to Kaizer Chiefs, but Nkausu was omitted from their matchday squad.

In July 2013, Nkausu was denied the chance to feature in SuperSport's friendly against English giants Manchester City – Manuel Pellegrini's first game in charge of the Citizens – due to injury. Nkausu would go on to have a frustrating start to the season with little pitch time, even being omitted from SuperSport's CAF Confederation Cup squad. In January 2014, with Nkausu having made just eight appearances in all competitions, SuperSport CEO Stan Matthews revealed that Mpumalanga Black Aces, Ajax Cape Town and Nkausu's former club University of Pretoria had all enquired about the defender's availability. However, on 31 January, Nkausu joined Bloemfontein Celtic on a three-and-a-half-year deal, just hours before the January transfer window slammed shut. Nkausu's last league appearance for SuperSport came in a 2–1 loss to Ajax Cape Town on 26 November 2013; ironically, Soccer Laduma reported that he was due to play for SuperSport against University of Pretoria on the day of his transfer to Bloemfontein.

=== Bloemfontein Celtic ===
A day after joining Celtic, Nkausu made his debut in a 2–0 derby win at Free State Stars.

=== Free State Stars ===
Nkausu left Free State Stars in summer 2017.

== International career ==
Davies has been capped by Zambia on twenty-one occasions. He made his debut for the Chipolopolo on 19 November 2008, in a 3–0 friendly loss to Morocco. Nkausu earned his second international cap in January 2009, in Zambia's 1–0 friendly defeat to South Africa. He also played in the first half of Zambia's unofficial friendly match against Power Dynamos of the Zambian Premier League in October 2011. The match was a warm-up for a game against Libya.

In December 2011 it was announced that Nkausu was included in Zambia's provisional 2012 Africa Cup of Nations squad. Nkausu was an unused substitute in Zambia's opening group stage match, a 2–1 win over Senegal on 21 January 2012. Nkausu made his first appearance of the tournament in Zambia's second game, a 2–2 draw with Libya on 25 January. Nkausu came on as a second-half substitute for midfielder Chisamba Lungu. He played the full ninety minutes of Zambia's final group stage game, a 1–0 win over Equatorial Guinea on 29 January 2012. The win ensured Zambia's progress to the quarter–finals. Nkausu also played the whole of the 3–0 quarter–final win over Sudan on 4 February 2012, helping Zambia book a semi–final showdown with tournament favourites Ghana, who coach Herve Renard described as "the best team in Africa".

Zambia won the semi–final 1–0 to progress to the final of the competition, against Ivory Coast. Nkausu personally had a bad start to the semi–final, giving away a penalty kick just seven minutes into the game for a foul on Ghana's Kwadwo Asamoah. However, Asamoah Gyan missed the penalty and Zambia later won the game thanks to a late goal by Emmanuel Mayuka. After the game, Nkausu led his teammates in parading the Zambian flag.

SuperSport United wished Nkausu luck on the day of the final, with a club statement claiming the Cup final would "certainly be Nkausu's biggest moment of his lifetime". Nkausu started the final at right–back, marking Ivory Coast's Salomon Kalou and later Max Gradel. After a goalless ninety minutes, and with the deadlock still not broken in extra time, the final went to a penalty shoot out. Zambia eventually triumphed 8–7, with Stoppila Sunzu scoring the winning penalty. Some sections of the media criticised Herve Renard for being overly harsh on Nkausu; the manager shoved the defender during the match after he suffered a lapse in concentration and allowed Gervinho to bear down on goal. However, Renard claimed that Nkausu and his teammates would not have been surprised or angered by the treatment, saying "For you maybe it's incredible for me to react like this, but they know me".

Nkausu played in Zambia's 3–1 unofficial friendly defeat of Pretoria Academy on 29 May 2012, the game acting as a warm–up match ahead of the Chipolopolo's 2014 FIFA World Cup qualification games.

He made his first international appearance after the African Cup of Nations in a 2–0 World Cup qualifying defeat to Sudan on 2 June 2012. The defender then featured in Zambia's 1–0 win over Ghana on 9 June, coming on as an injury–time replacement for Chisamba Lungu. Despite having played 90 minutes for SuperSport just three days earlier, Nkausu was part of the Zambian squad that travelled to Seoul on 13 August 2012 for a friendly against South Korea, a match that also acted as a warm-up game for a 2013 African Cup of Nations qualifier against Uganda in September. One of only six 2012 ACON-winning players in the squad for the friendly, Nkausu started the game against South Korea on the bench but replaced fellow full-back Joseph Musonda just 28 minutes into the match.

Nkausu played the entirety of Zambia's 1–0 first-leg victory over Uganda on 8 September 2012, assisting Christopher Katongo's winning goal with a long throw-in. He also started in the 1–0 second-leg defeat in Kampala on 13 October that took the tie to a penalty shoot-out; Nkausu scored his penalty, Zambia's penultimate effort, to help secure a 9–8 victory from the spot that booked the country's qualification to the 2013 Africa Cup of Nations. Nkausu's next international appearance came on 14 November in a 1–0 win over South Africa in the Nelson Mandela Challenge, being replaced early in the second half by Emmanuel Mbola.

Despite missing warm-up friendlies against Saudi Arabia and Tanzania through injury, on 24 December 2012 Nkausu was selected for Zambia's 26-man squad for the 2013 Africa Cup of Nations the following month. He subsequently started in Zambia's final warm-up games, goalless draws against Morocco and Norway on 8 and 12 January 2013 respectively.

On 21 January 2013, Nkausu played the entirety of Zambia's opening group game, a 1–1 draw with Ethiopia. Four days later he started in the 1–1 draw against Nigeria; Nkausu conceded a penalty for a foul on Ahmed Musa in the first half, but the resulting spot-kick was missed by Mikel John Obi. Nkausu had to be substituted just 16 minutes into Zambia's final group game against Burkina Faso on 29 January 2013 after sustaining an ankle injury; he left the pitch in tears and was forced to watch on from the sidelines as Zambia were eliminated from the competition following a 0–0 draw.

Nkausu earned his twentieth cap for Zambia in the 1–1 draw in Lesotho on 24 March 2013. On 5 June, he partnered Kondwani Mtongo in the heart of Zambia's defence in an experimental backline for the 2–1 behind-closed-doors win over local club Nkwazi FC. Nkausu subsequently played at centre-back alongside Noah Chivuta in the 4–0 second leg win over Lesotho on 8 June.

== Style of play ==
SuperSport United have described Nkausu as a "utility player" who "has the ability to play anywhere in the SuperSport defence"; he has also been hailed as a "versatile defender" by the African media. Although he is usually deployed at right-back, Nkausu has also played as a left-back, central defender and midfielder for club and country. Indeed, in 2002 Nkausu played in central midfield for Zambia's U-17 team, alongside future African Cup of Nations-winning teammates Clifford Mulenga and Rainford Kalaba; two years later he occupied a centre-back berth in Zambia's 2004 CECAFA Cup campaign.

Nkausu has been praised for his anticipation and interception skills, which helped him mark Salomon Kalou in the 2012 African Cup of Nations final. He is also known to have a good work–rate and a strong tackle, causing him to be considered a "good right-back against whom most wingers struggle". After a strong performance in the 2012 African Cup of Nations final, Nkausu was described as having "showed composure" and having a "big match temperament" that allowed him to cope with the pressure of such an important game. Nkausu has also been described as an "agile defender" who is known to possess a "long throw" when deployed as a full-back.

However, critics have highlighted Nkausu's positional sense as an area of weakness, claiming that he is frequently "caught out of position drifting into midfield areas". It has also been suggested that the defender is "error–prone", contributing to SuperSport United's "suspect defence", although The Post have since countered this view, describing the player as "a consistent member of Chipolopolo". Some commentators have criticised Nkausu's attacking play, noting that during the 2012 African Cup of Nations the player "booted the ball upfield too much, which conceded possession cheaply." Despite this, it has also been claimed that Nkausu's "creativity" helped him to become Zambia's first–choice right back in 2012 as his attacking play was seen to be better than that of fellow defender Joseph Musonda.

== Honours ==
=== Club ===
SuperSport United

- South African Premier Division: 2007–08, 2008–09, 2009–10

=== International ===
Zambia

- Africa Cup of Nations: 2012
