= Fousseny =

Fousseny is a given name. Notable people with the name include:

- Fousseny Coulibaly (born 1992), Ivorian footballer
- Fousseny Kamissoko (born 1983), Ivorian footballer
