= 2009–10 Libyan League Cup =

The 2009–10 Libyan League Cup was the third edition of the competition since its inception in 2007.

== Format ==
This edition saw the 14 teams competing in the 2009–10 Libyan Premier League split up into four groups depending on geographical location; seven teams from the west and the other seven from east. The top team from each group advanced to a two-legged semi-final, before a two-legged final to decide the winners. The competition was aimed at giving younger players and fringe first team players game time.

Group matches were played in March. The semi-finals and final took place in late May and early June.

== Groups ==
=== Group A ===
Team	Pld	W	D	L	GF	GA	GD	Pts
Nasr	4	2	2	0	6	3	+3	8
Tahaddy	4	1	2	1	3	4	−1	5
Akhdar	4	0	2	2	3	5	−2	2

	AKH	NSR	THY
Akhdar	–	1–1	1–1
Nasr	2–1	–	0–0
Tahaddy	1–0	1–3	–

=== Group B ===
Team	Pld	W	D	L	GF	GA	GD	Pts
Hilal	4	2	1	1	5	3	+2	7
Ahly Benghazi	4	2	0	2	7	8	−1	6
Najma	4	1	1	2	6	7	−1	4

	AHLYB	HIL	NJM
Ahly Benghazi	–	2–1	4–3
Hilal	2–0	–	1–1
Najma	2–1	0–1	–

== Semi-finals ==
=== First leg ===
28 May 2010
16:30 EET

Nasr	1–3	Madina
Salem al Rewani 18'		Muhammad Mqarej 6'; Abdallah al Sharif 23'; Snousi Imbarek 38' (o.g.)

Martyrs of February Stadium, Benina

28 May 2010
18:30 EET

Ittihad	0–0	Hilal

11 June Stadium, Tripoli

=== Second leg ===
4 June 2010
18:00 EET

Madina	1–1	Nasr
		Khaled Hussein

11 June Stadium, Tripoli

Madina won 4–2 on aggregate

5 June 2010
17:00 EET

Hilal	3–1	Ittihad
Ghassan al Maqini (pen.); Omar Diop 52'; Dimitri Edou Nzue 89'		Sapol Mani

Martyrs of February Stadium, Benina

Hilal won 3–1 on aggregate

== Final ==
=== First leg ===
13 June 2010

Madina	4–0	Hilal
Camara Sanosar; Eric Lawal; Izeddine al Sudaam

11 June Stadium

=== Second leg ===
16 June 2010

Hilal	0–0	Madina

Martyrs of February Stadium

Madina won 4–0 on aggregate
