= Rabea Al Laafi =

Libyan footballer (born 1991)

Rabea Al-Laafi
Personal information
- Full name: Rabea Aboubaker Al-Laafi
- Date of birth: 23 April 1991 (age 35)
- Place of birth: Libya
- Position: Defender

Team information
- Current team: Al-Nasr SC (Benghazi)

Senior career*
| Years | Team | Apps | (Gls) |
- Al-Nasr SC (Benghazi)

International career
| 2011–2021 | Libya | 27 | (1) |
- * Club domestic league appearances and goals

Rabea Aboubaker Al-Laafi (born 23 April 1991 in Libya) is a Libyan footballer who plays for Al-Nasr SC (Benghazi) and Libya national football team as a defender, He played at the 2012 African Cup of Nations against Equatorial Guinea and Zambia.

== International career ==
Rabea Al-Laafi debuted for Libya in 2011, and has earned 22 caps so far.

== Career statistics ==
=== International ===
Appearances and goals by national team and year
| National team | Year | Apps | Goals |
|---|---|---|---|
| Libya | 2011 | 7 | 0 |
| Libya | 2012 | 11 | 1 |
| Libya | 2013 | – | |
| Libya | 2014 | – | |
| Libya | 2015 | 5 | 0 |
| Libya | 2016 | 1 | 0 |
| Libya | 2017 | – | |
| Libya | 2018 | – | |
| Libya | 2019 | – | |
| Libya | 2020 | – | |
| Libya | 2021 | 3 | 0 |
| Total | | 27 | 1 |

Scores and results list Libya's goal tally first, score column indicates score after each Al Laafi goal.

List of international goals scored by Rabea Al Laafi
| No. | Date | Venue | Opponent | Score | Result | Competition |
|---|---|---|---|---|---|---|
| 1 | 15 August 2012 | Zuwara Stadium, Zuwarah, Libya | Ethiopia | 1–0 | 2–1 | Friendly |
