= Badara Diatta =

Senegalese football referee

- Born: 2 August 1969 (age 57)

International
Years	League	Role
1999–2015	FIFA	Referee

Badara Diatta (born 2 August 1969) is a Senegalese football referee.

A FIFA referee beginning in 1999, Diatta has refereed at the 2013 Africa Cup of Nations and at the 2006, 2010, and 2014 FIFA World Cup qualifiers. He has previously refereed in the 2008 Summer Olympics, as well as in the 2006, 2008, 2010, and 2012 Africa Cup of Nations. At the 2012 rendition of the tournament, Diatta was selected to referee the Final, where he handed out three yellow cards as the game was won by Zambia over Côte d'Ivoire on penalties.
