= Ben Konaté =

Ivorian footballer

Personal information
- Full name: Ben Mamadou Konaté
- Date of birth: 3 January 1989 (age 37)
- Place of birth: Adjamé, Abidjan, Ivory Coast
- Position: Defensive midfielder

Team information
- Current team: Olimpic Tashkent
- Number: 15

Youth career
- Académie de Sol Beni

Senior career*
Years	Team	Apps	(Gls)
2001	Lazer		
2001	Réveil Daloa		
2002	Stade d'Abidjan		
2002–2004	→ ASEC Mimosas (loan)		
2004–2007	Africa Sports		
2007	Faso-Yennenga		
2008	Renacimiento		
2009–2010	Atlético Semu		
2011–2012	The Panthers		
2013	Al-Quwa Al-Jawiya		
2014–2015	East Riffa		
2015–2016	Dhofar Club		
2016–2017	Dumlupınar	10	(0)
2018–2019	FC Zaamin		
2020–	Olimpic		

International career^{‡}
2010–2014	Equatorial Guinea	15	(0)
- * Club domestic league appearances and goals ‡ National team caps and goals as of 23 June 23:06 (UTC)

Ben Mamadou Konaté (born 3 January 1989) is a footballer who plays as a defensive midfielder.

Born in the Ivory Coast, he played for the Equatorial Guinea national team.

== Club career ==
Konaté has played for several clubs in Ivory Coast: Lazer, Réveil Daloa, Stade d'Abidjan, ASEC Mimosas (when Ivorian Romaric was still there) and Africa Sports. After that, he went to Burkina Faso, where he played football for Faso-Yennenga, and Equatorial Guinea, disputing the 2008 CAF Champions League (preliminary round) for Renacimiento.

In 2008, he was in the Moroccan football league.

In January 2012 due to his performances in the 2012 Africa Cup of Nations (playing for Equatorial Guinea), he attracted interest from Portuguese club Benfica.

From 2016 to 2017, Konaté played for Dumlupınar TSK in the Turkish Cypriot KTFF Süper Lig.

== International career ==
He played in several youth teams of the Ivory Coast national football team. He switched in 2009 to Equatorial Guinea and played his debut in the 2010 season. In January 2012 he was called up to the national side to be part of the squad to play in the 2012 Africa Cup of Nations.
