= Gílson Paulo =

Brazilian football manager (born 1949)

Personal information
- Full name: Gílson Paulo de Mello Filho
- Date of birth: 1 May 1949 (age 77)
- Place of birth: Rio de Janeiro, Brazil

Youth career
- Campo Grande
- Bangu

Senior career*
Years	Team	Apps	(Gls)
- São Cristóvão

Managerial career
- 2006: Estácio de Sá
- 2011: Vasco da Gama U15 (assistant)
- 2012: Equatorial Guinea
- * Club domestic league appearances and goals

Gílson Paulo de Mello Filho (born 1 May 1949), simply known as Gílson Paulo, is a Brazilian football manager, who previously managed the national team of Equatorial Guinea, a position he took up on 1 January 2012.

Although his contract with Equatorial Guinea had a duration of two months, the victories of the national team in the 2012 Africa Cup of Nations against Libya and especially Senegal achieved that was extended to one year.

== Career ==
Gílson Paulo had previously been a sports director at the academy of Brazilian club Vasco da Gama. where he was to return in mid-February.
