= Dimitri Edou Nzue =

Gabonese footballer

Dimitri Edou Nzue (born 4 April 1986) is a Gabonese former footballer who played as a striker.

== Career ==
He was formerly a member of FC 105 Libreville from 1999 to 2004 and Sogéa FC.

== International career ==
Nzue also competes on the Gabon national football team.
