= Marwan Mabrouk =

Libyan footballer (born 1989)

Personal information
- Full name: Marwan Mansour Mabrouk
- Date of birth: 15 December 1989 (age 36)

Team information
- Current team: Al-Ittihad Tripoli

Senior career*
Years	Team	Apps	(Gls)
- Olympic Zawiya
2009–2017	Al-Ittihad Tripoli		
2012	--> El Dakhleya (loan)		
2017–2018	Al-Nasr Benghazi		
2018–2021	Al-Ittihad Tripoli		
2021	Al-Ittihad Misurata		
2021–2023	Rafik Sorman		
2023–	Al-Jazeera Zuwara		

International career
2009–2016	Libya	25	(2)
Medal record
Men's football
Representing Libya
Arab Cup
Runner-up	2012 Saudi Arabia
- * Club domestic league appearances and goals

Marwan Mabrouk Mansour, sometimes referred to as Marwaan Mabrouk Mansour,(Arabic: مروان المبروك) (born 15 December 1989) is a Libyan footballer who played mostly for Al-Ittihad Tripoli in the Libyan Premier League.

== Career ==
Mabrouk began playing football for Libyan Premier League club Olympic Zawiya, including their run in the 2004 Libyan Super Cup, where the club lost the final to Al-Ittihad. He joined Al-Ittihad in 2009, and has been a fixture in their CAF Champions League and CAF Confederation Cup matches. Mabrouk helped Ittihad win its ninth consecutive Libyan Super Cup in 2010. He also played for the club in the 2010 CAF Confederation Cup, helping the club reach the semifinals.

He has been capped 25 times for the Libyan national football team, scoring two goals.

== Honours ==
Libya

- Arab Cup: runner-up, 2012
