= Kily Álvarez =

Equatoguinean footballer (born 1984)

Personal information
- Full name: David Álvarez Aguirre
- Date of birth: 5 February 1984 (age 42)
- Place of birth: Avilés, Spain
- Height: 1.75 m (5 ft 9 in)
- Position: Right-back

Youth career
- 1995–2003: Oviedo

Senior career*
Years	Team	Apps	(Gls)
2003–2004	Oviedo	26	(1)
2004–2006	Langreo	64	(4)
2006–2008	Atlético Madrid B	44	(0)
2008–2009	Orihuela	12	(1)
2009–2010	Novelda	29	(3)
2010	Marino	6	(0)
2010–2013	Langreo	80	(4)
2013	Noja	10	(0)
2014	Cudillero	19	(1)
2015	L'Entregu	0	(0)
2015–2016	Grisú	?	(4)
2018–20??	Madalena		

International career
2007–2014	Equatorial Guinea	22	(1)
- * Club domestic league appearances and goals as of 8 January 2017

David 'Kily' Álvarez Aguirre (born 5 February 1984) is a former professional footballer who played as either a right-back or a right midfielder. Born in Spain, he played for the Equatorial Guinea national team.

He spent his entire career in Spain, but never in higher than Segunda División B.

Kily represented Equatorial Guinea at the 2012 Africa Cup of Nations.

== Early life ==
Kily was born in Avilés, Asturias, Spain to a Spanish mother and an Equatoguinean father, never knowing the latter.

== Club career ==
After finishing his youth career with the club, Kily started playing with Real Oviedo, having the honour of scoring its first-ever goal in Tercera División. He spent his entire career in the Spanish lower leagues, also representing UP Langreo (two spells), Atlético Madrid B, Orihuela CF, Novelda CF, Marino de Luanco, SD Noja, CD Cudillero and L'Entregu CF.

In 2018, Kily helped La Madalena de Morcín CF to their first promotion ever to the fourth level.

== International career ==
Kily made his debut for Equatorial Guinea in 2007. He was selected in the squad that appeared at the 2012 Africa Cup of Nations on home soil, where on 25 January he scored arguably the country's most important goal, netting in the 90th minute for a 2–1 group stage win against Senegal, which meant the hosts qualified to the quarter-finals at the expense of their opponents.

=== International goals ===
Scores and results show Equatorial Guinea's goal tally first. Score column gives score after Alvarez's goal.

No.	Date	Venue	Opponent	Score	Result	Competition
1.	25 January 2012	Estadio de Bata, Bata, Equatorial Guinea	Senegal	2–1	2–1	2012 Africa Cup of Nations
