= Fousseny Kamissoko =

Ivorian-born Equatoguinean footballer (born 1983)

Fousseny Kamissoko (born 5 April 1983) is a former professional footballer who played as a defender.

== Career ==
Kamissoko played for ASC Bouaké, COD Meknès, AS Salé, Suwaiq Club and Al-Shabab SC.

Born in Abidjan, Ivory Coast, Kamissoko is of Malian heritage and was naturalized as an Equatoguinean citizen. He was a member of the Equatorial Guinea national team and was part of the squad at the 2012 Africa Cup of Nations.
