= Hijani Himoonde =

Zambian footballer (born 1986)

Personal information
- Date of birth: 1 August 1986 (age 40)
- Place of birth: Ndola, Zambia
- Height: 1.83 m (6 ft 0 in)
- Position: Defender

Senior career*
Years	Team	Apps	(Gls)
2006–2007	Lusaka Dynamos		
2007	Zanaco Lusaka		
2007–2009	Lusaka Dynamos		
2009–2010	ZESCO United		
2010–2013	TP Mazembe		
2014–2016	Mamelodi Sundowns		
2014	→ ZESCO United (loan)		
2016	Nkwazi		
2017–2018	Power Dynamos		

International career^{‡}
2007–2014	Zambia	42	(1)
Medal record
Men's football
Representing Zambia
Africa Cup of Nations
Winner	2012 Equatorial Guinea-Gabon
- * Club domestic league appearances and goals ‡ National team caps and goals as of 07:43, 19 August 2020 (UTC)

Hijani Himoonde also known as Hichani Himoonde (born 1 August 1986) is a Zambian former professional footballer who played as a defender. Between 2006 and 2013 he made 42 FIFA-official appearances scoring 1 goal for the Zambia national team.

== Career ==
Himoonde was born in Ndola.

He made his Africa Cup of Nations début against Cameroon in the 2008 Africa Cup of Nations.

In 2014, he joined South African Premier Division side Mamelodi Sundowns from TP Mazembe.

== Honours ==
TP Mazembe

- Super Ligue: 2011, 2012, 2013
- CAF Champions League: 2010
- CAF Super Cup: 2010, 2011

Zambia

- Africa Cup of Nations: 2012
