= José Bokung =

Equatorial Guinean footballer

Colin
Personal information
- Full name: José Bokung Alogo
- Date of birth: 31 December 1987 (age 38)
- Place of birth: Ebibeyin, Equatorial Guinea
- Height: 1.71 m (5 ft 7 in)
- Position: Right back

Team information
- Current team: Deportivo Unidad

Senior career*
Years	Team	Apps	(Gls)
2006–2009	Renacimiento FC		
2009–2016	Deportivo Mongomo		
- Deportivo Unidad

International career^{‡}
2007–2012	Equatorial Guinea	12	(0)
2010–2011	Equatorial Guinea U-23	2	(0)
- * Club domestic league appearances and goals as of 30 April 2009 ‡ National team caps and goals as of 29 January 2012

José Bokung Alogo (born 31 December 1987), also known as Colin, is an Equatoguinean footballer who plays as a defender for local club Deportivo Unidad. He was a member of the Equatorial Guinea national team.

== International career ==
Colin has been international with the Equatorial Guinea national football team, at least, in a World Cup 2010 Qualifying match against South Africa and in four friendly matches (against Cape Verde, Mali, Estonia, Chad, Gambia and Guinea-Bissau).

He played also in unofficial matches at the 2008 (two matches), 2009 and 2010 CEMAC Cup (two matches) and in six friendlies (vs. the Brazilian club Cruzeiro, the French side RSC Montreuil, Brittany, France U-20, OGC Nice and the UNFP team).
