= Samir Aboud =

Libyan footballer (born 1972)

Samir Abboud
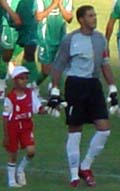

Personal information
- Date of birth: 29 September 1972 (age 54)
- Place of birth: Tripoli, Libya
- Height: 1.80 m (5 ft 11 in)
- Position: Goalkeeper

Senior career*
Years	Team	Apps	(Gls)
1991–2013	Al-Ittihad	615	(4)

International career
1998–2012	Libya	36	(0)
- * Club domestic league appearances and goals

Samir Aboud (Arabic: سمير عبود) (born 29 September 1972) is a Libyan former footballer who played for Al-Ittihad as a goalkeeper. He was a member of the Libya national team.

== Honours ==
- He has won the most Libyan Football Competitions (25 titles).
- Libyan Premier League 9
  - (Libya) Al-Ittihad 1991, 2002, 2003, 2005, 2006, 2007, 2008, 2009, 2010
- Libyan Cup 6
  - (Libya) Al-Ittihad 1992, 1999, 2004, 2005, 2007, 2009
- Libyan Super Cup 10
  - (Libya) Al-Ittihad 1999, 2002, 2003, 2004, 2005, 2006, 2007, 2008, 2009, 2010

2012 African Goalkeeper of the year.

- Abbud is the only Libyan football player who had played two semi-finals in African Club Competitions.
  - 1st Semi-Final was in African Cup Winners' Cup 2000 with Al-Ittihad
  - 2nd Semi-Final was in CAF Champions League 2007 with Al-Ittihad
- He has scored four Goals in his football Career
  - 1st goal was in the LPL in 2005 against (Libya) Al Shat from the penalty spot.
  - 2nd goal was in the ACL in 2005 against (Morocco) Al Wydad Casablanca from the penalty spot.
  - 3rd goal was in the LPL in 2009 against (Libya) Attahaddy Benghazi S.C. from the penalty spot.
  - 4th goal was in the LPL in 2009 against (Libya) Al-Nasr SCSC (Benghazi) from the penalty spot.
- CAF Team of the Year: 2011
