= Narcisse Ekanga =

Cameroonian footballer

Personal information
- Full name: Narcisse Ekanga Amia
- Date of birth: 30 July 1987 (age 39)
- Place of birth: Douala, Cameroon
- Height: 1.76 m (5 ft 9 in)
- Position: Midfielder

Senior career*
Years	Team	Apps	(Gls)
2003	Dynamo Douala		
2004–2007	Astres FC	57	(4)
2008–2012	TP Mazembe	60	(2)
2012–2014	Al-Hilal Omdurman	20	(1)
2014–2015	Leones Vegetarianos	25	(9)
2015–2016	1960 Silopispor	13	(1)
2017	Buildcon F.C.		

International career
2011–2012	Equatorial Guinea	8	(0)
- * Club domestic league appearances and goals

Narcisse Ekanga Amia (born 30 July 1987) is a former professional footballer who played as a midfielder. Born in Cameroon, he made eight appearances for the Equatorial Guinea national team.

His year of birth is not clear since he was registered as born in 1981 by the Cameroonian Football Federation, as well as born in 1985 and 1987 by FIFA. He usually competes with the latter. He was referred in his natal Cameroon as an age defrauder.

== Club career ==
Ekanga played for TP Mazembe in the 2009 FIFA Club World Cup and 2010 FIFA Club World Cup, where they reached the final losing 3–0 to Inter Milan.

== International career ==
Ekanga debuted with Equatorial Guinea on 7 September 2011 in a friendly match against Central African Republic in Malabo.
