= Danilo Clementino =

Brazilian footballer (born 1982)

Danilo
Personal information
- Full name: Emmanuel Danilo Clementino Silva
- Date of birth: 5 March 1982 (age 44)
- Place of birth: Caruaru, Pernambuco, Brazil
- Height: 1.84 m (6 ft 0 in)
- Position: Goalkeeper

Youth career
- 1997–1999: Sport Recife

Senior career*
Years	Team	Apps	(Gls)
1999–2005	Sport Recife		
2004	→ Campinense (loan)		
2005–2006	ASA		
2006–2007	Nacional de Patos		
2008	Porto de Caruaru		
2008	Sergipe		
2008–2009	Porto de Caruaru		
2009–2010	Araripina		
2010	Coríntians-RN		
2010	Timbaúba		
2011	Cabense		
2011	Serra Talhada		
2011	Salgueiro		
2012	América de Recife		
2012	Treze		
2013	Serra Talhada		
2013–2015	Alecrim		
2015	Globo		
2016	Paraíba		
2017	Auto Esporte		

International career^{‡}
2006–2013	Equatorial Guinea	19	(0)
- * Club domestic league appearances and goals as of 18 May 2009 ‡ National team caps and goals as of 26 January 2015

Emmanuel Danilo Clementino Silva (born 5 March 1982), known as Danilo, is a retired footballer who played as a goalkeeper.

Born in Brazil, he was a member, as a naturalized citizen, of the Equatorial Guinea national team.

== Biography ==
Danilo was born in Caruaru, a city located in the eastern of the Brazilian state of Pernambuco.

=== Football career ===
Danilo started his career in the Sport Recife's low divisions. In 2004, was loaned to Campinense and won the Campeonato Paraibano. Danilo had received an offer to play in the Spanish club Numancia, but he wasn't signed because this team already had three foreign players. He also has been linked to play in the Chinese football.

In 2013, while at the Alecrim ranks, Danilo was diagnosed with cerebral malaria and stayed in coma for 10 days, with doctors saying that he had 1% chance of surviving. However, he had fully recovered and resumed his professional career.

== International career ==
Danilo is naturalized Equatoguinean since 2006, when Antônio Dumas (Brazilian coach who naturalized Brazilian footballers for Togo and Equatorial Guinea) was the coach of the Equatorial Guinea national football team. Since that time, Danilo has been consolidated in the goal of his new home. His better moment with the Nzalang Nacional (Equatorial Guinea national team's nickname) was against Cameroon in the 2008 Africa Cup of Nations qualification, on 9 September 2007.

He played in unofficial matches vs. the Region of Murcia and Extremadura in 2007 and against Brittany in 2011.

== Titles ==
Season	Club	Title
2004	Campinense-PB	Campeonato Paraibano
