= Kennedy Mweene =

Zambian footballer (born 1984)

Personal information
- Full name: Kennedy Mweene
- Date of birth: 11 December 1984 (age 41)
- Place of birth: Lusaka, Zambia
- Height: 1.82 m (6 ft 0 in)
- Position: Goalkeeper

Youth career
- State House

Senior career*
Years	Team	Apps	(Gls)
2003	Lusaka Celtic		
2004	Lusaka Dynamos	27	(0)
2005	Kitwe United	30	(0)
2005–2013	Free State Stars	191	(11)
2013–2023	Mamelodi Sundowns	88	(0)
Total		336	(11)

International career^{‡}
2004–2021	Zambia	122	(2)
Medal record
Representing Zambia
Men's football
Africa Cup of Nations
Winner	2012 Gabon & Equatorial Guinea
- * Club domestic league appearances and goals as of 11 July 2023 ‡ National team caps and goals as of 11 July 2023

Kennedy Mweene (born 11 December 1984) is a retired Zambian professional footballer who played as a goalkeeper. On club level he spent most of his career in South African Premier Soccer League clubs Free State Stars and Mamelodi Sundowns. For the Zambia national team, he is the most capped player, having represented Zambia more than 120 times.

== Club career ==
Renowned for his penalty-saving and penalty-taking skills, Mweene was arguably one of the best goalkeepers in Africa, winning the PSL Goalkeeper of the Season award (best player in the South African top division) in the 2008–09 season. He played for Free State Stars until the end of the 2012–13 season. On 27 June 2013, he agreed to a three-year deal with Mamelodi Sundowns.

Mweene retired in July 2023.

== International career ==
After being beaten from the spot by Samuel Eto'o at the 2008 Africa Cup of Nations, he went on to save every penalty he was presented with while playing for the Zambia national team. He was the first-choice goalkeeper for Zambia after making his debut in 2004 and was a participant at the 2006 African Nations Cup, 2008 African Nations Cup, 2010 African Nations Cup and the 2012 African Nations Cup. On 12 February 2012, Mweene kept a clean sheet during the 2012 Africa Cup of Nations Final and saved one penalty kick (as well as successfully converted his own) in the shootout to decide the game, which was eventually won by Zambia. He was chosen as the goalkeeper of the tournament. During the 2013 Africa Cup of Nations Mweene converted a penalty kick, earning a 1–1 draw against Nigeria and also saved two penalties during the tournament.

In 2015, Mweene participated in the sixth edition of the Africa Cup of Nations, the 2015 Africa Cup of Nations, which was the 30th edition of the Africa Cup of Nations and was hosted by Equatorial Guinea from 17 January to 8 February 2015.

== Career statistics ==
As of 13 January 2017
Scores and results list Zambia's goal tally first, score column indicates score after each Mweene goal.

List of international goals scored by Kennedy Mweene
No.	Date	Venue	Opponent	Score	Result	Competition
1	25 January 2013	Mbombela Stadium, Nelspruit, South Africa	Nigeria	1–1	1–1	2013 Africa Cup of Nations
2	15 October 2014	Levy Mwanawasa Stadium, Ndola, Zambia	Niger	3–0	3–0	2015 Africa Cup of Nations qualifying

== Honours ==
Free State Stars

- Baymed Cup: 2006

Mamelodi Sundowns

- Premier Soccer League (8): 2013–14, 2015–16, 2017–18, 2018–19, 2019–20, 2020–21, 2021–22, 2022–23
- Nedbank Cup: 2015, 2020,2022
- Telkom Knockout: 2015,2019
- CAF Champions league: 2016
- CAF Super Cup: 2017
- MTN 8: 2021

Zambia

- Africa Cup of Nations: 2012

== See also ==
- List of footballers with 100 or more caps
- List of goalscoring goalkeepers
