= Daniel Ekedo =

Nigerian footballer (born 1989)

Personal information
- Full name: Daniel Vladmir Ekedo Chigozirim
- Date of birth: 19 September 1989 (age 37)
- Place of birth: Lagos, Nigeria
- Height: 1.89 m (6 ft 2 in)
- Position: Midfielder

Senior career*
Years	Team	Apps	(Gls)
2008	Akonangui	30	(5)
2009–2010	Deportivo Mongomo	32	(6)
2010–2012	San Roque de Lepe	37	(0)
2012–2013	→ Ceuta (loan)	10	(0)
2013	Houston Dynamo Reserves	1	(0)
2013–2014	Moghreb Tétouan	11	(0)
2014–2015	Al-Ittihad Salalah		
2015	Deportivo Mongomo		
2016	San Roque de Lepe	9	(0)
2016	Ceuta	6	(0)
2016–2017	San Roque de Lepe	24	(0)
2017–2018	Los Barrios	32	(0)
2018–2019	San Roque de Lepe	38	(1)
2019–2020	L'Hospitalet	11	(0)
2020–2021	Los Barrios	30	(0)
2021–2022	Puente Genil	18	(0)
2022	Atlético Porcuna	8	(0)
2023	Rapitenca	5	(0)

International career^{‡}
2009–2012	Equatorial Guinea	16	(1)
- * Club domestic league appearances and goals as of 26 March 2023 ‡ National team caps and goals as of 9 September 2012

Daniel Vladmir Ekedo Chigozirim (born 19 September 1989) is a footballer who plays as a midfielder. Born and raised in Nigeria to Nigerian parents, he has played in the Equatoguinean league and subsequently capped for the Equatorial Guinea national team.

== Career ==
=== Club career ===
Ekedo played in Equatorial Guinea for Akonangui and Deportivo Mongomo where he was voted player of the season by the national media. He moved to Spain, where he was signed by former Barcelona coach, Sergio Lobera for Segunda División B club San Roque. He played over 40 matches to lead San Roque to their most successful season. In summer 2012, he was transferred to Spanish club AD Ceuta where Sergio Lobera was now the head coach.

The following season, Ekedo was signed by the champions of Morocco, Moghreb Atlético Tetuán. Playing in a central midfield position, Ekedo was named five times in the Botola League, team of the week. However, fiscal problems at Moghreb led to Ekedo leaving the club. He was soon after signed up on a lucrative contract by Al Itihaad in the top flight in Oman.

=== International career ===
Like many foreign players who have played or are currently playing in the league of Equatorial Guinea, Ekedo was naturalized in that country and called for the Equatoguinean squad (then coached by Vicente Engonga) that played against Sierra Leone on 8 September 2008, however he did not appear in the match. Ekedo eventually played in a friendly match against Mali on 25 March 2009.

On 8 February 2011, Ekedo scored his first goal with the senior team against Chad.
