= Ihaab Boussefi =

Libyan footballer (born 1985)

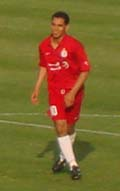

Personal information
- Full name: Ihaab Boussefi
- Date of birth: 23 June 1985 (age 41)
- Place of birth: Tripoli, Libya
- Position: Striker

Youth career
- Al-Ittihad

Senior career*
Years	Team	Apps	(Gls)
2005–2006	Al-Mustaqbal	14	(7)
2006–2009	Al-Ittihad		
2009–2010	Nasr	20	(3)
2010–2011	Al-Ittihad		
2011–2012	CS Hammam-Lif	14	(3)

International career
2011–2012	Libya	16	(5)
Medal record
Men's football
Representing Libya
Arab Cup
Runner-up	2012 Saudi Arabia
- * Club domestic league appearances and goals as of 4 March 2018

Ihaab Boussefi (Arabic: إيهاب البوسيفي; born 23 June 1985) is a Libyan footballer. He currently plays for Nasr in the Libyan Premier League. He has been capped several times at full international level for Libya, and scored both goals as Libya beat Senegal at the 2012 Africa Cup of Nations.

== Honours ==
Libya

- Arab Cup: runner-up, 2012
