= Walid Mhadeb El Khatroushi =

Libyan footballer (born 1985)

Walid Mhadeb
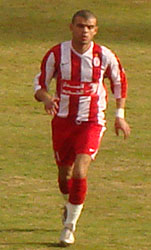

Personal information
- Full name: Walid Mhadeb El Khatroushi
- Date of birth: 6 November 1985 (age 40)
- Place of birth: Tripoli, Libya
- Height: 1.75 m (5 ft 9 in)
- Position: Midfielder

Team information
- Current team: Al-Ittihad
- Number: 4

Youth career
- Al-Ittihad

Senior career*
Years	Team	Apps	(Gls)
2005–	Al-Ittihad	28	(2)

International career
2008–2012	Libya	11	(1)
- * Club domestic league appearances and goals as of 27 January 2007

Walid Mhadeb El Khatroushi (Arabic: وليد مهذب الختروشي, born 6 November 1985), known as Tofaha (Apple in English), is a Libyan football midfielder.

== Career ==
El-Khatroushi currently plays at the club level for Al-Ittihad.

He is also part of the Libya national football team, and was a member of the Libyan Olympic squad that won the bronze medal in the 2005 Mediterranean Games.
