= Hesham Shaban =

Libyan footballer (born 1980)

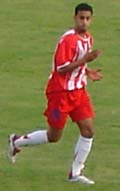

Personal information
- Full name: Hesham Ahmed Shaban
- Date of birth: August 8, 1980 (age 46)
- Place of birth: Tripoli, Libya
- Height: 1.77 m (5 ft 10 in)
- Position: Left back

Senior career*
Years	Team	Apps	(Gls)
2004–06	Al-Madina	?	(?)
2006–2016	Al-Ittihad	?	(?)

International career
- Libya
- * Club domestic league appearances and goals as of January 27, 2007

Hesham Shaban (Arabic: هشام شعبان; born August 8, 1980) is a Libyan football defender currently playing for Al-Ittihad. Shaban has been a member of the Libya national football team. In 2008, Shaban appeared five times for the Libya national team in the 2010 FIFA World Cup qualifying rounds, scoring in a 4–0 win over Lesotho. He played in the 2009 African Nations Championship and scored for the winning team in the final of the Libyan Cup 2008–09.
