= Abubakr Al Abaidy =

Libyan footballer (born 1981)

Personal information
- Full name: Abubakr Rajeb al Abaidy
- Date of birth: October 27, 1981 (age 45)
- Place of birth: Libya
- Position: Midfielder

Team information
- Current team: Al-Nasr Benghazi
- Number: 16

Senior career*
Years	Team	Apps	(Gls)
–2004	Al-Nasr Benghazi		
2004–2005	Al-Ahly Tripoli		
2005–2006	Al-Hilal Benghazi		
2006–2017	Al-Nasr Benghazi		

International career
2005–	Libya	3	(0)
- * Club domestic league appearances and goals

Abubakr Rajeb al Abaidy also known as Abubakr Obeidi (Arabic: أبوبكر رجب العبيدى) (born October 27, 1981) is a Libyan footballer. He plays for Nasr in the Libyan Premier League.

Al Abaidy has made several appearances for the Libya national football team, including participation in the 2012 Africa Cup of Nations finals.
