= Joseph Musonda =

Zambian footballer (born 1977)

Personal information
- Date of birth: 30 May 1977 (age 49)
- Place of birth: Kalulushi, Zambia
- Height: 1.76 m (5 ft 9 in)
- Position: Defender

Team information
- Current team: Nkana (physical coach)

Youth career
- 1995: Kalulushi Modern Stars

Senior career*
Years	Team	Apps	(Gls)
1995–2003	Nkana		
2003–2005	ZESCO United	89	(1)
2005	→ Free State Stars (loan)	25	(0)
2005–2006	ZESCO United		
2007	Zanaco		
2007–2014	Golden Arrows	164	(7)
2014–2015	Polokwane City	21	(0)
2015–2019	Nkana		

International career
2002–2014	Zambia	108	(0)
Medal record
Men's football
Representing Zambia
Africa Cup of Nations
Winner	2012
- * Club domestic league appearances and goals

Joseph Musonda (born 30 May 1977) is a Zambian former professional football who played as a defender.

An accomplished and reliable defender, he plays in either full back position for the Zambia national team and centre back for his club. He is Zambia's second most capped player after Kennedy Mweene according to FIFA.

== Career ==
Musonda was born in Kalulushi. Described by FIFA as the 'father figure' of the Zambian team, Musonda is fit and still very much a part of the nation's defence of the Africa Cup of Nations.

Having contributed so much to Zambia's historic win in the 2012 Africa Cup of Nations it was cruel that Joseph Musonda's final against Ivory Coast should be cut short by injury after just 11 minutes. Despite this, Musonda was finally able to celebrate what was his 100th match for Zambia when his team went on to win 8–7 on penalties. Musonda injured his ankle making a vital intervention against Gervinho who was bearing down on goal and he left the field in visible distress. Despite his uncompromising defending, Joseph Musonda is considered to be one of the gentlemen of the Zambia national team, so it was no surprise when his opponent that day, Didier Drogba, came to comfort him as he was brought off the field. Manager Herve Renard would later carry him up to receive his winners medal.

Musonda made a much quicker recovery from that ankle injury than was expected demonstrating his powers of recovery and he was soon playing again for Golden Arrows in South Africa. Indeed, in June 2012 the club tied him to a three-year contract extension that will take Musonda to 38 years of age. At the time, Joseph Musonda turned down the opportunity to play in the United Arab Emirates on a lucrative contract.

Joseph Musonda was part of the Zambian 2006 African Nations Cup team. He was also picked in the 2008 squad for the AFCON and Zambia were eliminated in the group stage before being part of the 2010 squad that made it to the Quarter Finals of the competition eventually losing to Nigeria in a penalty shoot-out.

In his native Zambia, Musonda was a two times winner of the league championship with Nkana FC in 1999 and 2001.

== Post-playing career ==
On 12 November 2019, it was confirmed, that 42-year old Musonda had retired after more than 20 years of playing professional football and would continue as a physical coach at Nkana, signing a two-year deal with the club.

== Honours ==
Zambia

- Africa Cup of Nations: 2012

== See also ==
- List of footballers with 100 or more caps
