= Deme N'Diaye =

Senegalese footballer

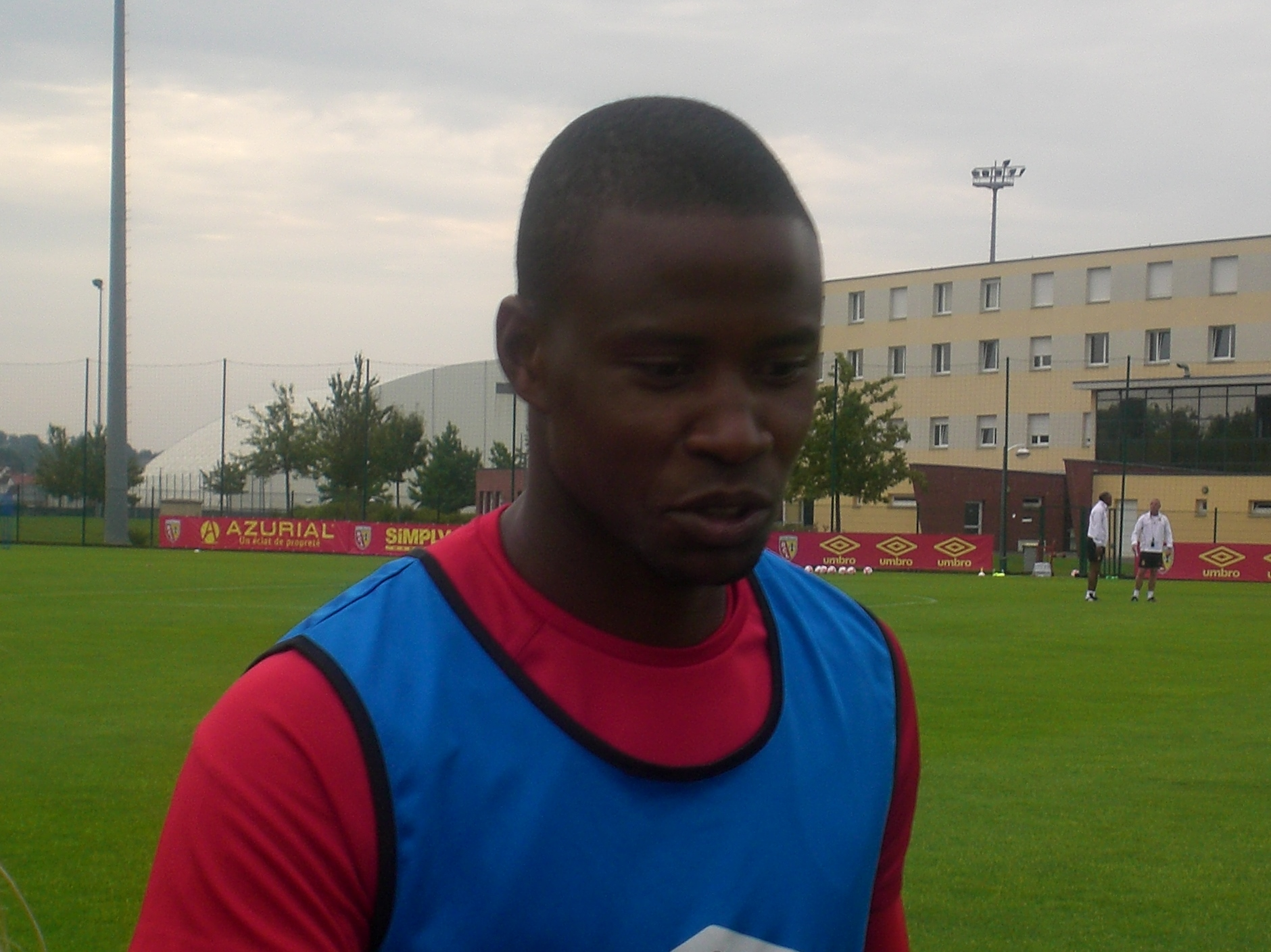
- N'Diaye at Lens training in 2015

Personal information
- Date of birth: 6 February 1985 (age 41)
- Place of birth: Dakar, Senegal
- Height: 1.83 m (6 ft 0 in)
- Position: Striker

Youth career
- –1999: Guédiawaye FC

Senior career*
Years	Team	Apps	(Gls)
2002–2005	Douanes		
2006–2009	Estrela Amadora	52	(4)
2009–2012	Arles-Avignon	88	(9)
2012–2016	Lens	74	(5)
2018–2019	Arras	19	(9)

International career
2009–2013	Senegal	14	(2)
- * Club domestic league appearances and goals

Deme N'Diaye (born 6 February 1985) is a Senegalese former professional footballer who played as a striker. He previously played for Portuguese club Estrela Amadora, and French clubs Arles-Avignon, RC Lens, and Arras FA.

== Career ==
N'Diaye began his career with Dakar-based team AS Douanes and signed in January 2006 for C.F. Estrela da Amadora.

N'Diaye signed for AC Arles-Avignon from Estrela Amadora on 17 July 2009.

In December 2019, having been without a club after leaving National 2 side Arras FA, he dropped out of professional football to join a local team.
