= Christopher Katongo =

Zambian footballer (born 1982)

Chris Katongo
Personal information
- Date of birth: 31 August 1982 (age 44)
- Place of birth: Mufulira, Zambia
- Height: 1.73 m (5 ft 8 in)
- Position: Striker

Senior career*
Years	Team	Apps	(Gls)
2001–2004	Green Buffaloes	75	(20)
2004–2007	Jomo Cosmos	72	(36)
2007–2008	Brøndby	44	(10)
2008–2010	Arminia Bielefeld	61	(10)
2010–2011	Skoda Xanthi	28	(2)
2011–2013	Henan Construction	71	(21)
2014	Golden Arrows	11	(0)
2014–2015	Bidvest Wits	17	(2)
2015–2017	Green Buffaloes		

International career
2003–2016	Zambia	97	(23)
Medal record
Men's football
Representing Zambia
Africa Cup of Nations
Winner	2012 Equatorial Guinea-Gabon
- * Club domestic league appearances and goals

Christopher Katongo (born 31 August 1982) is a Zambian former professional footballer who played as a striker. At international level, he amassed over 100 caps between 2003 and 2016 for the Zambia national team. He is an Africa Cup of Nations winner and won the BBC's African Footballer of the Year award in 2012, winning just over 40% of the public vote. His win is stated to have inspired a number of young players in Zambia.

== Club career ==
Born in Mufulira, Katongo played with Butondo West Tigers and Kalulushi Modern Stars before moving to Green Buffaloes in 2001. Whilst at Buffaloes, Katongo twice scored four times in CAF Confederation Cup games. In 2004, Katongo moved to South African side Jomo Cosmos, before moving to Danish side Brøndby IF in January 2007. In August 2008, Katongo moved again, this time to German club Arminia Bielefeld. In July 2010, he moved to Greece to play for Skoda Xanthi.

In July 2011, Katongo signed a two-and-a-half-year contract with Chinese Super League side Henan Construction. He made his Super League debut on 10 July in a 0–0 home draw against Changchun Yatai. His first goal for Henan came, in a 2–1 away defeat, against Dalian Shide on 10 September 2011.

In March 2014, Katongo joined South African side Golden Arrows on a four-month deal, three months after leaving the Chinese club.

== International career ==
Katongo made his international debut for Zambia in 2003, and after scoring a hat-trick against South Africa in September 2007, Katongo was promoted in the Zambian Army from corporal to sergeant.

Katongo has appeared in FIFA World Cup qualifying matches.

Katongo won the Player of the Tournament during the 2012 Africa Cup of Nations, in which he was the captain for the winning side, having beaten Ivory Coast 8–7 on penalties after a goalless match, scoring the first of the penalties himself.

He was called up to Zambia's 23-man squad for the 2013 Africa Cup of Nations.

In October 2014 he was thrown out of a Zambian training camp, and in December 2014 he was left out of Zambia's preliminary squad for the 2015 Africa Cup of Nations.

He was in the 2016 preliminary squad for the CHAN.

== Coaching career ==
As of December 2016, he had begun training for his coaching qualifications.

== Personal life ==
His younger brother Felix is also an international player.

== Career statistics ==
=== International goals ===
Scores and results list Zambia's goal tally first.

No	Date	Venue	Opponent	Score	Result	Competition
1.	13 August 2005	Mmabatho Stadium, Mahikeng, South Africa	South Africa	2–0	2–2	2006 COSAFA Cup
2.	30 January 2006	Alexandria Stadium, Alexandria, Egypt	South Africa	1–0	1–0	2006 Africa Cup of Nations
3.	22 July 2006	Independence Stadium, Windhoek, Namibia	Malawi	3–1	3–1	2006 COSAFA Cup
4.	8 September 2007	Newlands Stadium, Cape Town, South Africa	South Africa	1–0	3–1	2008 Africa Cup of Nations qualification
5.	8 September 2007	Newlands Stadium, Cape Town, South Africa	South Africa	2–0	3–1	2008 Africa Cup of Nations qualification
6.	8 September 2007	Newlands Stadium, Cape Town, South Africa	South Africa	3–0	3–1	2008 Africa Cup of Nations qualification
7.	6 January 2008	Stade 7 November, Radès, Tunisia	Tunisia	1–0	2–1	Friendly
8.	6 January 2008	Stade 7 November, Radès, Tunisia	Tunisia	2–0	2–1	Friendly
9.	26 January 2008	Baba Yara Stadium, Kumasi, Ghana	Cameroon	1–5	1–5	2008 Africa Cup of Nations
10.	30 January 2008	Baba Yara Stadium, Kumasi, Ghana	Egypt	1–1	1–1	2008 Africa Cup of Nations
11.	21 June 2008	Konkola Stadium, Chililabombwe, Zambia	Swaziland	1–0	1–0	2010 FIFA World Cup qualification
12.	17 January 2010	Estádio Nacional da Tundavala, Lubango, Angola	Cameroon	2–2	2–3	2010 Africa Cup of Nations
13.	4 June 2011	Nkoloma Stadium, Lusaka, Zambia	Mozambique	1–0	3–0	2012 Africa Cup of Nations qualification
14.	4 June 2011	Nkoloma Stadium, Lusaka, Zambia	Mozambique	2–0	3–0	2012 Africa Cup of Nations qualification
15.	4 September 2011	Stade Said Mohamed Cheikh, Mitsamiouli, Comoros	Comoros	1–0	2–1	2012 Africa Cup of Nations qualification
16.	25 January 2012	Estadio de Bata, Bata, Equatorial Guinea	Libya	2–2	2–2	2012 Africa Cup of Nations
17.	29 January 2012	Estadio de Malabo, Malabo, Equatorial Guinea	Equatorial Guinea	1–0	1–0	2012 Africa Cup of Nations
18.	4 February 2012	Estadio de Bata, Bata, Equatorial Guinea	Sudan	2–0	3–0	2012 Africa Cup of Nations
19.	9 June 2012	Levy Mwanawasa Stadium, Ndola, Zambia	Ghana	1–0	1–0	2014 FIFA World Cup qualification
20.	8 September 2012	Levy Mwanawasa Stadium, Ndola, Zambia	Uganda	1–0	1–0	2013 Africa Cup of Nations qualification
21.	8 June 2013	Levy Mwanawasa Stadium, Ndola, Zambia	Lesotho	2–0	4–0	2014 FIFA World Cup qualification
22.	6 June 2014	Raymond James Stadium, Tampa, USA	Japan	1–0	3–4	Friendly
23.	23 January 2016	Umuganda Stadium, Gisenyi, Rwanda	Uganda	1–0	1–0	2016 African Nations Championship
24.	4 June 2016	Estadio 24 de Setembro, Bissau, Guinea-Bissau	Guinea-Bissau	2–2	2–3	2017 Africa Cup of Nations qualification

== Honours ==
Jomo Cosmos

- Coca-Cola Cup: 2005

Henan Construction

- China League One: 2013

Zambia

- Africa Cup of Nations: 2012

== See also ==
- List of footballers with 100 or more caps
