= Rainford Kalaba =

Zambian footballer (born 1986)

Personal information
- Full name: Rainford Kalaba
- Date of birth: 14 August 1986 (age 40)
- Place of birth: Kitwe, Zambia
- Height: 1.78 m (5 ft 10 in)
- Position: Midfielder

Senior career*
Years	Team	Apps	(Gls)
2005	Afrisports Kitwe United	26	(19)
2005–2006	Nice B	3	(0)
2006–2008	ZESCO United	?	(23)
2008–2010	Braga	0	(0)
2008–2009	→ Gil Vicente (loan)	22	(4)
2009	→ Leiria (loan)	3	(1)
2011–2023	TP Mazembe	280	(78)

International career
2005–2018	Zambia	103	(15)
- * Club domestic league appearances and goals

Rainford Kalaba (born 14 August 1986) is a Zambian former professional footballer who played as a midfielder.

== Career ==
Kalaba was born in Kitwe.

He signed a five-year contract with Primeira Liga side Braga in April 2008.

In October 2013, due to a disagreement between their club TP Mazembe and the Zambian Football Association over international call-ups, Kalaba and two other players (Nathan Sinkala and Stoppila Sunzu) were the subject of a Zambian arrest warrant. All three players later had their passports confiscated by Zambian immigration authorities, before being pardoned by the Zambian government.

He made his 100th international appearance against Mozambique national football team in June 2017 but was substituted in a 1–0 defeat and was in the opinion of national team manager Wedson Nyirenda too hasty to return to the dressing room rather than watch his teammates and needed to be disciplined. He was not chosen in the squads for the 2018 World Cup qualifying matches against Algeria and Nigeria in autumn 2017.

== Career statistics ==
Scores and results list Zambia's goal tally first.

No	Date	Venue	Opponent	Score	Result	Competition
1.	11 June 2005	Independence Stadium, Lusaka, Zambia	Swaziland	3–0	3–0	2005 COSAFA Cup
2.	22 July 2006	Independence Stadium, Windhoek, Namibia	Malawi	2–1	3–1	2006 COSAFA Cup
3.	26 November 2006	Addis Ababa Stadium, Addis Ababa, Ethiopia	Burundi	1–3	2–3	2006 CECAFA Cup
4.	2 December 2006	Addis Ababa Stadium, Addis Ababa, Ethiopia	Zanzibar	4–0	4–0	2006 CECAFA Cup
5.	9 June 2007	Jamhuri Stadium, Morogoro, Tanzania	Tanzania	1–1	1–1	Friendly
6.	6 June 2009	Konkola Stadium, Chililabombwe, Zambia	Rwanda	1–0	1–0	2010 FIFA World Cup qualifying
7.	9 January 2010	Rand Stadium, Johannesburg, South Africa	South Korea	2–0	4–2	Friendly
8.	21 January 2010	Estádio Nacional de Ombaka, Benguela, Angola	Gabon	1–0	2–1	2010 Africa Cup of Nations
9.	5 September 2010	Konkola Stadium, Chililabombwe, Zambia	Comoros	1–0	4–0	2012 Africa Cup of Nations qualifying
10.	18 September 2010	Ali Mohsen Al-Muraisi Stadium, Sana'a, Yemen	Yemen	1–0	1–0	Friendly
11.	21 January 2012	Estadio de Bata, Bata, Equatorial Guinea	Senegal	2–0	2–1	2012 Africa Cup of Nations
12.	15 October 2014	Levy Mwanawasa Stadium, Ndola, Zambia	Niger	1–0	3–0	2015 Africa Cup of Nations qualifying
13.	29 March 2015	National Heroes Stadium, Lusaka, Zambia	Rwanda	1–0	2–0	Friendly
14.	8 September 2015	National Heroes Stadium, Lusaka, Zambia	Gabon	1–0	1–1	Friendly
15.	4 September 2016	Levy Mwanawasa Stadium, Ndola, Zambia	Kenya	1–0	1–1	2017 Africa Cup of Nations qualifying

== Honours ==
ZESCO United

- Primera Division de Zambia: 2007
- Zambian Cup: 2006

TP Mazembe

- Linafoot: 2011, 2012, 2013, 2013–14, 2015–16
- CAF Champions League: 2015
- CAF Super Cup: 2011, 2016
- CAF Confederation Cup: 2016

Zambia

- Africa Cup of Nations: 2012

Individual

- Zambia Super League Top scorer: 2007
- CAF Confederation Cup Top scorer: 2016

== See also ==
- List of footballers with 100 or more caps
