= Abdallah Sharif =

Libyan footballer (born 1985)

Abdallah Sharif (Arabic: عبد الله الشريف; born 30 March 1985) is a Libyan former footballer who played as a midfielder.

Sharif was called up to the Libya national team for its friendly match against Benin.
