= 2012 Africa Cup of Nations =

28th edition of the Africa Cup of Nations

Copa Africana de Naciones 2012; Campeonato Africano das Nações de 2012; Coupe d'Afrique des Nations 2012; AFCON 2012; CAN 2012

Tournament details
- Host countries: Equatorial Guinea; Gabon
- Dates: 21 January – 12 February
- Teams: 16
- Venues: 4 (in 4 host cities)

Final positions
- Champions: Zambia (1st title)
- Runners-up: Ivory Coast
- Third place: Mali
- Fourth place: Ghana

Tournament statistics
- Matches played: 32
- Goals scored: 76 (2.38 per match)
- Attendance: 456,332 (14,260 per match)
- Top scorer(s): (Angola) Manucho (Gabon) Pierre-Emerick Aubameyang (Ivory Coast) Didier Drogba (Mali) Cheick Diabaté (Morocco) Houssine Kharja (Zambia) Christopher Katongo (Zambia) Emmanuel Mayuka (3 goals each)
- Best player: (Zambia) Christopher Katongo
- Fair play award: Ivory Coast

The 2012 Africa Cup of Nations, also known as the Orange Africa Cup of Nations for sponsorship reasons, was the 28th edition of the Africa Cup of Nations, the football championship of Africa organized by the Confederation of African Football (CAF).

The competition took place between 21 January and 12 February 2012, and it was co-hosted by Equatorial Guinea and Gabon. The bidding process for hosting the tournament ended in September 2006.

The matches were played in four stadiums in four host cities, with the final played at the newly built Stade d'Angondjé in Gabon's capital and largest city, Libreville. Fourteen teams were selected for participation via a continental qualification tournament that began in July 2010.

The 2012 edition of the Africa Cup of Nations took place against the backdrop of political turmoil. Libya and Tunisia qualified for the tournament, even as the Arab Spring brought upheaval and regime change to both nations. Traditional African footballing nations such as reigning champions Egypt (also affected by political events), as well as Cameroon, Algeria, Nigeria and South Africa had failed to qualify. Players from third-placed Mali had pleaded for the insurgency in the north of their country to end.

In the first round of the tournament finals, the teams competed in round-robin groups of four teams for points, with the top two teams in each group proceeding. These eight teams advanced to the knockout stage, where three rounds of play decided which teams would participate in the final. Both host nations, Equatorial Guinea and Gabon, were eliminated from the competition at the quarter-final stage.

In the final, unfancied Zambia defeated third-time finalists Ivory Coast after a dramatic penalty shootout, despite the fact that Ivory Coast did not concede a single goal during the entire tournament, giving Zambia their first continental title. Manager Hervé Renard dedicated their win to the members of the national team who died in a plane crash near the final's venue in Libreville in 1993.

== Host selection ==
Bids :

- Angola (selected as hosts for 2010)
- Gabon / Equatorial Guinea (selected as hosts for 2012)
- Libya (selected as hosts for 2013)
- Nigeria (selected as reserve hosts for 2010, 2012 & 2013 tournaments)

Rejected Bids :

- Benin / Central African Republic
- Botswana
- Mozambique
- Namibia
- Senegal
- Zimbabwe

On 4 September 2006, the Confederation of African Football (CAF) approved a compromise between rival countries to host the Africa Cup of Nations after it ruled out Nigeria. CAF agreed to award the next three editions from 2010 to Angola, Equatorial Guinea, Gabon and Libya respectively. They assigned Angola in 2010, Equatorial Guinea and Gabon, which submitted a joint bid in 2012, and Libya for 2014.

This edition was awarded to Gabon and Equatorial Guinea to rotate the hosting of the cup and give hosting chance for first-timer nations.

Two-time former host Nigeria was the reserve host for the 2010, 2012 and 2014 tournaments, in the event that any of the host countries failed to meet the requirements established by CAF, although this ended up being unnecessary.

The 2014 tournament was pushed forward to 2013 and subsequently held in odd-numbered years to avoid clashing with the FIFA World Cup.

== Qualification ==
The qualification process involved ten groups of four, one of which was reduced to a group of three after the withdrawal of Mauritania, and one group of five. The top team from each group goes through, as well as the second placed team from the group of five. The two best second place teams also qualify. At the end of the qualification process, fourteen teams would have qualified, as well as the two host nations. The first qualifiers were held on 1 July 2010.

=== Qualified teams ===
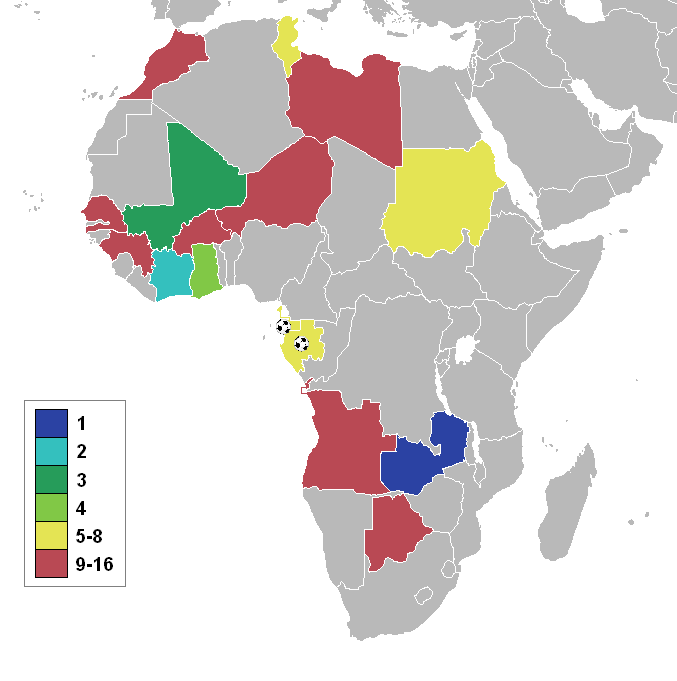
A map of Africa showing the qualified nations, highlighted by stage reached.

| Country | Qualified as | Qualification date | Appearance in finals | Previous best performance | Regional body | FIFA ranking^{1} | Continental ranking^{1} |
|---|---|---|---|---|---|---|---|
| Angola | Group J Winner | 8 October 2011 | 6th | Quarterfinals (2008, 2010) | COSAFA | 85 | 19 |
| Botswana | Group K Winner | 26 March 2011 | 1st | none | COSAFA | 94 | 21 |
| Burkina Faso | Group F Winner | 3 September 2011 | 8th | Fourth place (1998) | WAFU | 66 | 14 |
| Ivory Coast | Group H Winner | 5 June 2011 | 19th | Winner (1992) | WAFU | 18 | 1 |
| Equatorial Guinea | Co-host | 29 July 2007 | 1st | none | UNIFFAC | 151 | 41 |
| Gabon | Co-host | 29 July 2007 | 5th | Quarterfinals (1996) | UNIFFAC | 91 | 20 |
| Ghana | Group I Winner | 8 October 2011 | 18th | Winner (1963, 1965, 1978, 1982) | WAFU | 26 | 2 |
| Guinea | Group B Winner | 8 October 2011 | 10th | Second place (1976) | WAFU | 79 | 17 |
| Libya | Top Two Runner-Up | 8 October 2011 | 3rd | Second place (1982) | UNAF | 63 | 13 |
| Mali | Group A Winner | 8 October 2011 | 7th | Second place (1972) | WAFU | 69 | 15 |
| Morocco | Group D Winner | 9 October 2011 | 14th | Winner (1976) | UNAF | 61 | 12 |
| Niger | Group G Winner | 8 October 2011 | 1st | none | WAFU | 98 | 22 |
| Senegal | Group E Winner | 3 September 2011 | 12th | Second place (2002) | WAFU | 43 | 5 |
| Sudan | Top Two Runner-Up | 9 October 2011 | 8th | Winner (1970) | CECAFA | 120 | 30 |
| Tunisia | Group K Runner-up | 8 October 2011 | 15th | Winner (2004) | UNAF | 59 | 10 |
| Zambia | Group C Winner | 8 October 2011 | 15th | Second place (1974, 1994) | COSAFA | 71 | 16 |

^{1} FIFA World Rankings, release of 18 January 2012.

== Controversies ==
=== Togo ===
Togo were initially banned from the 2012 and 2013 Africa Cup of Nations tournaments by CAF after they withdrew from the 2010 tournament following an attack on their team bus. Togo appealed to the Court of Arbitration for Sport, with FIFA president Sepp Blatter stepping in to mediate. The ban was subsequently lifted with immediate effect on 14 May 2010, after a meeting of the CAF Executive Committee. Togo were therefore free to play in the 2012 and 2013 qualifiers.

=== Nigeria ===
On 30 June 2010, after Nigeria's exit from the 2010 FIFA World Cup, Nigerian President Goodluck Jonathan punished the team for a poor campaign by imposing a two-year ban from international competition. This would have resulted in the Nigerians missing out on both the 2012 qualifying phase and the 2012 African Cup of Nations. However, on 5 July, the Nigerian government dropped the ban after FIFA threatened to impose harsher international sanctions as a result of the government interference. Nigeria competed in qualifying for the 2012 Africa Cup of Nations as scheduled but failed to qualify.

== Venues ==
The opening match, one semi-final and the third place match were held in Equatorial Guinea, while the other semi-final and the final were held in Gabon.

Location of the host cities of the 2012 Africa Cup of Nations
- Equatorial Guinea
- 1 Bata
- 2 Malabo
- Gabon
- 3 Franceville
- 4 Libreville

| City | Stadium | Capacity |
|---|---|---|
| (Equatorial Guinea) Bata | Estadio de Bata | 41,000 |
| (Gabon) Franceville | Stade de Franceville | 22,000 |
| (Gabon) Libreville | Stade d'Angondjé | 40,000 |
| (Equatorial Guinea) Malabo | Estadio de Malabo | 20,000 |

== Draw ==
The draw for the final tournament took place on 29 October 2011 at the Sipopo Conference Palace in Malabo, Equatorial Guinea. The draw ceremony was attended by the two presidents from the host countries, President Ali Bongo of Gabon and President Teodoro Obiang Nguema of Equatorial Guinea. The draw saw the 16 qualified teams being pitted into four groups of four teams each. The two top teams from each group will qualify for the quarter-finals with the winners progressing to the semi-finals and final eventually.

The two hosts were automatically seeded into pot 1. The other 14 qualified teams were ranked based on their performances during the previous three Africa Cup of Nations tournaments. For each of the last three African Cup of Nations final tournaments, the following system of points is adopted for the qualified countries:

| Classification | Points awarded |
|---|---|
| Winner | 7 |
| Runner-up | 5 |
| Losing semi-finalists | 3 |
| Losing quarter-finalists | 2 |
| Eliminated in 1st round | 1 |

Moreover, a weighted coefficient on points was given to each of the last three editions of the Africa Cup of Nations as follows:

- 2010 edition: points to be multiplied by 3
- 2008 edition: points to be multiplied by 2
- 2006 edition: points to be multiplied by 1

The teams were then divided into four pots based on the ranking. Each group contained one team from each pot. Equatorial Guinea and Gabon, as co-hosts, were automatically seeded as the top team in Group A and C respectively.

| Pot 1 | Pot 2 | Pot 3 | Pot 4 |
|---|---|---|---|
| Equatorial Guinea (co-hosts); Gabon (co-hosts); Ghana (22 pts); Ivory Coast (17 pts) | Angola (11 pts); Tunisia (9 pts); Zambia (9 pts); Guinea (6 pts) | Mali (5 pts); Senegal (5 pts); Morocco (3 pts); Burkina Faso (3 pts) | Sudan (2 pts); Libya (1 pt); Botswana (0 pts); Niger (0 pts) |

== Match officials ==
The following referees were chosen for the 2012 Africa Cup of Nations.

| Referees | Linesmen |
|---|---|
| Mohamed Benouza; Djamel Haimoudi; Néant Alioum; Noumandiez Doué; Gehad Grisha; Eric Otogo-Castane; Bakary Gassama; Hamada Nampiandraza; Koman Coulibaly; Ali Lemghaifry; Rajindraparsad Seechurn; Bouchaïb El Ahrach; Badara Diatta; Eddy Maillet; Daniel Bennett; Khalid Abdel Rahman; Slim Jedidi; Janny Sikazwe | Albdelhak Etchiali; Jean-Claude Birumushahu; Evarist Menkouande; Yanoussa Moussa; Richard Bouende-Malonga; Songuifolo Yeo; Angesom Ogbamariam; Theophile Vinga; Aboubacar Doumbouya; Marwa Range; Moffat Champiti; Balla Diarra; Balkrishna Bootun; Redouane Achik; David Shaanika; Peter Edibe; Felicien Kabanda; Djibril Camara; Jason Damoo; Zakhele Siwela; Bechir Hassani |

== Squads ==
Each team's squad for the tournament consisted of 23 players; only players in these squads were eligible to take part in the tournament. Each participating national association had to submit their squad by 11 January 2012 (midnight CET). Replacement of seriously injured players was permitted until 24 hours before the team in question's first match of the tournament.

== Group stage ==
Groups A and B took place in Equatorial Guinea, while Groups C and D were held in Gabon. Notably, there was not a single goalless draw during the group stage.

=== Tie-breaking criteria ===
If two or more teams end the group stage with the same number of points, their ranking is determined by the following criteria:

1. points earned in the matches between the teams concerned;
2. goal difference in the matches between the teams concerned;
3. number of goals scored in the matches between the teams concerned;
4. goal difference in all group matches;
5. number of goals scored in all group matches;
6. fair play points system taking into account the number of yellow and red cards;
7. drawing of lots by the organising committee.

All times are West Africa Time (UTC+1).

=== Group A ===
| Pos | Team | Pld | W | D | L | GF | GA | GD | Pts | Qualification |
|---|---|---|---|---|---|---|---|---|---|---|
| 1 | Zambia | 3 | 2 | 1 | 0 | 5 | 3 | +2 | 7 | Advance to knockout stage |
| 2 | Equatorial Guinea (H) | 3 | 2 | 0 | 1 | 3 | 2 | +1 | 6 | Advance to knockout stage |
| 3 | Libya | 3 | 1 | 1 | 1 | 4 | 4 | 0 | 4 | |
| 4 | Senegal | 3 | 0 | 0 | 3 | 3 | 6 | −3 | 0 | |

Source: CAF
(H) Hosts
21 January 2012
19:30

| Equatorial Guinea | 1–0 | Libya |
|---|---|---|
| Balboa 87' | Report |

Estadio de Bata, Bata
Attendance: 35,000
Referee: Noumandiez Doué (Ivory Coast)
21 January 2012
22:00

| Senegal | 1–2 | Zambia |
|---|---|---|
| N'Doye 73' | Report | Mayuka 12'; Kalaba 20' |

Estadio de Bata, Bata
Attendance: 17,500
Referee: Néant Alioum (Cameroon)

25 January 2012
18:15 (Note: Original kick-off at 17:00 but was delayed due to heavy rain.)

| Libya | 2–2 | Zambia |
|---|---|---|
| Saad 5', 48' | Report | Mayuka 29'; C. Katongo 54' |

Estadio de Bata, Bata
Attendance: 1,500
Referee: Koman Coulibaly (Mali)
25 January 2012
21:15 (Note: Original kick-off at 20:00 but was pushed back due to the delay of the Libya–Zambia match.)

| Equatorial Guinea | 2–1 | Senegal |
|---|---|---|
| Randy 61'; Kily 90+3' | Report | Sow 89' |

Estadio de Bata, Bata
Attendance: 35,000
Referee: Khalid Abdel Rahman (Sudan)

29 January 2012
19:00

| Equatorial Guinea | 0–1 | Zambia |
|---|---|---|
| | Report | C. Katongo 68' |

Estadio de Malabo, Malabo
Attendance: 44,000
Referee: Mohamed Benouza (Algeria)
29 January 2012
19:00

| Libya | 2–1 | Senegal |
|---|---|---|
| Boussefi 5', 84' | Report | D. N'Diaye 10' |

Estadio de Bata, Bata
Attendance: 10,000
Referee: Rajindraparsad Seechurn (Mauritius)

=== Group B ===
| Pos | Team | Pld | W | D | L | GF | GA | GD | Pts | Qualification |
|---|---|---|---|---|---|---|---|---|---|---|
| 1 | Ivory Coast | 3 | 3 | 0 | 0 | 5 | 0 | +5 | 9 | Advance to knockout stage |
| 2 | Sudan | 3 | 1 | 1 | 1 | 4 | 4 | 0 | 4 | Advance to knockout stage |
| 3 | Angola | 3 | 1 | 1 | 1 | 4 | 5 | −1 | 4 | |
| 4 | Burkina Faso | 3 | 0 | 0 | 3 | 2 | 6 | −4 | 0 | |

Source: CAF
22 January 2012
17:00

| Ivory Coast | 1–0 | Sudan |
|---|---|---|
| Drogba 39' | Report |

Estadio de Malabo, Malabo
Attendance: 5,000
Referee: Rajindraparsad Seechurn (Mauritius)
22 January 2012
20:00

| Burkina Faso | 1–2 | Angola |
|---|---|---|
| A. Traoré 58' | Report | Mateus Galiano 48'; Manucho 68' |

Estadio de Malabo, Malabo
Attendance: 17,000
Referee: Mohamed Benouza (Algeria)

26 January 2012
17:00

| Sudan | 2–2 | Angola |
|---|---|---|
| Bashir 32', 74' | Report | Manucho 4', 50' (pen.) |

Estadio de Malabo, Malabo
Attendance: 2,500
Referee: Ali Lemghaifry (Mauritania)
26 January 2012
20:00

| Ivory Coast | 2–0 | Burkina Faso |
|---|---|---|
| Kalou 16'; B. Koné 82' (o.g.) | Report |

Estadio de Malabo, Malabo
Attendance: 4,000
Referee: Gehad Grisha (Egypt)

30 January 2012
19:00

| Sudan | 2–1 | Burkina Faso |
|---|---|---|
| Karika 33', 79' | Report | Ouédraogo 90+5' |

Estadio de Bata, Bata
Attendance: 132
Referee: Eric Otogo-Castane (Gabon)
30 January 2012
19:00

| Ivory Coast | 2–0 | Angola |
|---|---|---|
| Eboué 33'; Bony 64' | Report |

Estadio de Malabo, Malabo
Attendance: 1,500
Referee: Slim Jedidi (Tunisia)

=== Group C ===
| Pos | Team | Pld | W | D | L | GF | GA | GD | Pts | Qualification |
|---|---|---|---|---|---|---|---|---|---|---|
| 1 | Gabon (H) | 3 | 3 | 0 | 0 | 6 | 2 | +4 | 9 | Advance to knockout stage |
| 2 | Tunisia | 3 | 2 | 0 | 1 | 4 | 3 | +1 | 6 | Advance to knockout stage |
| 3 | Morocco | 3 | 1 | 0 | 2 | 4 | 5 | −1 | 3 | |
| 4 | Niger | 3 | 0 | 0 | 3 | 1 | 5 | −4 | 0 | |

Source: CAF
(H) Hosts
23 January 2012
17:00

| Gabon | 2–0 | Niger |
|---|---|---|
| Aubameyang 31'; N'Guéma 42' | Report |

Stade d'Angondjé, Libreville
Attendance: 38,000
Referee: Eddy Maillet (Seychelles)
23 January 2012
20:00

| Morocco | 1–2 | Tunisia |
|---|---|---|
| Kharja 86' | Report | Korbi 34'; Msakni 76' |

Stade d'Angondjé, Libreville
Attendance: 28,000
Referee: Daniel Bennett (South Africa)

27 January 2012
17:00

| Niger | 1–2 | Tunisia |
|---|---|---|
| N'Gounou 9' | Report | Msakni 4'; Jemâa 89' |

Stade d'Angondjé, Libreville
Attendance: 20,000
Referee: Janny Sikazwe (Zambia)
27 January 2012
20:00

| Gabon | 3–2 | Morocco |
|---|---|---|
| Aubameyang 76'; Cousin 79'; Mbanangoyé 90+10' | Report | Kharja 24', 90+1' (pen.) |

Stade d'Angondjé, Libreville
Attendance: 35,000
Referee: Bakary Gassama (Gambia)

31 January 2012
19:00

| Gabon | 1–0 | Tunisia |
|---|---|---|
| Aubameyang 61' | Report |

Stade de Franceville, Franceville
Attendance: 22,000
Referee: Noumandiez Doué (Ivory Coast)
31 January 2012
19:00

| Niger | 0–1 | Morocco |
|---|---|---|
| | Report | Belhanda 78' |

Stade d'Angondjé, Libreville
Attendance: 4,000
Referee: Hamada Nampiandraza (Madagascar)

=== Group D ===
| Pos | Team | Pld | W | D | L | GF | GA | GD | Pts | Qualification |
|---|---|---|---|---|---|---|---|---|---|---|
| 1 | Ghana | 3 | 2 | 1 | 0 | 4 | 1 | +3 | 7 | Advance to knockout stage |
| 2 | Mali | 3 | 2 | 0 | 1 | 3 | 3 | 0 | 6 | Advance to knockout stage |
| 3 | Guinea | 3 | 1 | 1 | 1 | 7 | 3 | +4 | 4 | |
| 4 | Botswana | 3 | 0 | 0 | 3 | 2 | 9 | −7 | 0 | |

Source: CAF
24 January 2012
17:00

| Ghana | 1–0 | Botswana |
|---|---|---|
| John Mensah 25' | Report |

Stade de Franceville, Franceville
Attendance: 5,000
Referee: Badara Diatta (Senegal)
24 January 2012
20:00

| Mali | 1–0 | Guinea |
|---|---|---|
| B. Traoré 30' | Report |

Stade de Franceville, Franceville
Attendance: 10,000
Referee: Slim Jedidi (Tunisia)

28 January 2012
17:00

| Botswana | 1–6 | Guinea |
|---|---|---|
| Selolwane 23' (pen.) | Report | S. Diallo 15', 27'; A. R. Camara 42'; Traoré 45'; M. Bah 83'; Soumah 86' |

Stade de Franceville, Franceville
Attendance: 4,000
Referee: Bouchaïb El Ahrach (Morocco)
28 January 2012
20:00

| Ghana | 2–0 | Mali |
|---|---|---|
| Gyan 64'; A. Ayew 71' | Report |

Stade de Franceville, Franceville
Attendance: 7,000
Referee: Djamel Haimoudi (Algeria)

1 February 2012
19:00

| Botswana | 1–2 | Mali |
|---|---|---|
| Ngele 50' | Report | Dembélé 56'; Keita 75' |

Stade d'Angondjé, Libreville
Attendance: 20,000
Referee: Khalid Abdel Rahman (Sudan)
1 February 2012
19:00

| Ghana | 1–1 | Guinea |
|---|---|---|
| Agyemang-Badu 27' | Report | A. R. Camara 45' |

Stade de Franceville, Franceville
Attendance: 5,500
Referee: Daniel Bennett (South Africa)

== Knockout stage ==
In the knockout stage, extra time and a penalty shoot-out were used to decide the winners if necessary.

=== Bracket ===
Quarter-finals
4 February – Bata
Zambia | 3
Sudan | 0
5 February – Franceville
Ghana (a.e.t.) | 2
Tunisia | 1
5 February – Libreville
Gabon | 1 (4)
Mali (p) | 1 (5)
4 February – Malabo
Ivory Coast | 3
Equatorial Guinea | 0

Semi-finals
8 February – Bata
Zambia | 1
Ghana | 0
8 February – Libreville
Mali | 0
Ivory Coast | 1

Final
12 February – Libreville
Zambia (p) | 0 (8)
Ivory Coast | 0 (7)
Third place play-off
11 February – Malabo
Ghana | 0
Mali | 2

=== Quarter-finals ===
4 February 2012
17:00

| Zambia | 3–0 | Sudan |
|---|---|---|
| Sunzu 15'; C. Katongo 66'; Chamanga 86' | Report |

Estadio de Bata, Bata
Attendance: 200
Referee: Bakary Gassama (Gambia)

4 February 2012
20:00

| Ivory Coast | 3–0 | Equatorial Guinea |
|---|---|---|
| Drogba 35', 69'; Y. Touré 81' | Report |

Estadio de Malabo, Malabo
Attendance: 12,500
Referee: Eddy Maillet (Seychelles)

5 February 2012
17:00

| Gabon | 1–1 (a.e.t.) | Mali |
|---|---|---|
| Mouloungui 54' | Report | Diabaté 85' |
Penalties
| Poko (penalty scored); Mbanangoyé (penalty scored); Mouloungui (penalty scored); Aubameyang (penalty missed); Manga (penalty scored) | 4–5 | (penalty scored) Diabaté; (penalty scored) Yatabaré; (penalty scored) Kanté; (penalty scored) B. Traoré; (penalty scored) Keita |

Stade d'Angondjé, Libreville
Attendance: 30,000
Referee: Djamel Haimoudi (Algeria)

5 February 2012
20:00

| Ghana | 2–1 (a.e.t.) | Tunisia |
|---|---|---|
| John Mensah 9'; A. Ayew 100' | Report | Khelifa 41' |

Stade de Franceville, Franceville
Attendance: 8,000
Referee: Néant Alioum (Cameroon)

=== Semi-finals ===
8 February 2012
17:00

| Zambia | 1–0 | Ghana |
|---|---|---|
| Mayuka 78' | Report |

Estadio de Bata, Bata
Attendance: 12,000
Referee: Mohamed Benouza (Algeria)

8 February 2012
20:00

| Mali | 0–1 | Ivory Coast |
|---|---|---|
| | Report | Gervinho 45' |

Stade d'Angondjé, Libreville
Attendance: 32,000
Referee: Daniel Bennett (South Africa)

=== Third place play-off ===
11 February 2012
20:00

| Ghana | 0–2 | Mali |
|---|---|---|
| | Report | Diabaté 23', 80' |

Estadio de Malabo, Malabo
Attendance: 15,000
Referee: Gehad Grisha (Egypt)

=== Final ===
12 February 2012
20:30 UTC+1

| Zambia | 0–0 (a.e.t.) | Ivory Coast |
|---|---|---|
| | Report |
Penalties
| C. Katongo (penalty scored); Mayuka (penalty scored); Chansa (penalty scored); F. Katongo (penalty scored); Mweene (penalty scored); Sinkala (penalty scored); Lungu (penalty scored); Kalaba (penalty missed); Sunzu (penalty scored) | 8–7 | (penalty scored) Tioté; (penalty scored) Bony; (penalty scored) Bamba; (penalty scored) Gradel; (penalty scored) Drogba; (penalty scored) Tiéné; (penalty scored) Ya Konan; (penalty missed) K. Touré; (penalty missed) Gervinho |

Stade d'Angondjé, Libreville
Attendance: 40,000
Referee: Badara Diatta (Senegal)

== Awards ==
- Player of the tournament: (Zambia) Christopher Katongo
- Top goalscorer of the competition: (Zambia) Emmanuel Mayuka
- Fair Player of the competition: (Ivory Coast) Jean-Jacques Gosso
- Fair Play award: Ivory Coast

=== Team of the tournament ===
The following players were selected in the 2012 Africa Cup of Nations Team of the Tournament for their performances throughout the tournament. The team was selected by the tournament's Technical Study Group (TSG).

| Goalkeepers | Defenders | Midfielders | Forwards |
|---|---|---|---|
| (Zambia) Kennedy Mweene | (Ivory Coast) Jean-Jacques Gosso (Zambia) Stophira Sunzu (Ghana) John Mensah (Mali) Adama Tamboura | (Zambia) Emmanuel Mayuka (Ivory Coast) Yaya Touré (Ivory Coast) Gervinho (Mali) Seydou Keita | (Zambia) Christopher Katongo (Ivory Coast) Didier Drogba |

Substitutes

- (Ivory Coast) Boubacar Barry
- (Equatorial Guinea) Rui
- (Tunisia) Youssef Msakni
- (Angola) Manucho
- (Gabon) Éric Mouloungui
- (Gabon) Pierre-Emerick Aubameyang
- (Guinea) Sadio Diallo
- (Mali) Cheick Diabaté
- (Morocco) Houssine Kharja
- (Sudan) Mudather El Tahir
- (Zambia) Rainford Kalaba
- (Ghana) Kwadwo Asamoah

=== Tournament rankings ===
Ranking criteria
For teams eliminated in the same knockout round, the following criteria are applied, in the order given, to determine the final rankings:
1. Goal difference in round eliminated;
2. Goals scored in round eliminated;
3. If teams eliminated in the semi-finals or quarter-finals are tied, the above criteria are reapplied for the previous knockout round, with this process repeated once more should two semi-finalists remain tied;
4. Points in group stage;
5. Goal difference in group stage;
6. Goals scored in group stage;
7. Disciplinary points.

For teams eliminated in the group stage, the following criteria are applied, in the order given, to determine the final rankings:

1. Position in group;
2. Points;
3. Goal difference;
4. Goals scored;
5. Disciplinary points.

| Pos. | Team | G | Pld | W | D | L | Pts | GF | GA | GD |
|---|---|---|---|---|---|---|---|---|---|---|
| 1 | Zambia | A | 6 | 4 | 2 | 0 | 14 | 9 | 3 | +6 |
| 2 | Ivory Coast | B | 6 | 5 | 1 | 0 | 16 | 9 | 0 | +9 |
| 3 | Mali | D | 6 | 3 | 1 | 2 | 10 | 6 | 5 | +1 |
| 4 | Ghana | D | 6 | 3 | 1 | 2 | 10 | 6 | 5 | +1 |
Eliminated in the quarter-finals
| 5 | Gabon | C | 4 | 3 | 1 | 0 | 10 | 7 | 3 | +4 |
| 6 | Tunisia | C | 4 | 2 | 0 | 2 | 6 | 5 | 5 | 0 |
| 7 | Equatorial Guinea | A | 4 | 2 | 0 | 2 | 6 | 3 | 5 | −2 |
| 8 | Sudan | B | 4 | 1 | 1 | 2 | 4 | 4 | 7 | −3 |
Eliminated in the group stage
| 9 | Guinea | D | 3 | 1 | 1 | 1 | 4 | 7 | 3 | +4 |
| 10 | Libya | B | 3 | 1 | 1 | 1 | 4 | 4 | 4 | 0 |
| 11 | Angola | C | 3 | 1 | 1 | 1 | 4 | 4 | 5 | −1 |
| 12 | Morocco | A | 3 | 1 | 0 | 2 | 3 | 4 | 5 | −1 |
| 13 | Senegal | A | 3 | 0 | 0 | 3 | 0 | 3 | 6 | −3 |
| 14 | Burkina Faso | B | 3 | 0 | 0 | 3 | 0 | 2 | 6 | −4 |
| 15 | Niger | C | 3 | 0 | 0 | 3 | 0 | 1 | 5 | −4 |
| 16 | Botswana | D | 3 | 0 | 0 | 3 | 0 | 2 | 9 | −7 |

== Scorers ==
3 goals

- (Angola) Manucho
- (Gabon) Pierre-Emerick Aubameyang
- (Ivory Coast) Didier Drogba
- (Mali) Cheick Diabaté
- (Morocco) Houssine Kharja
- (Zambia) Christopher Katongo
- (Zambia) Emmanuel Mayuka

2 goals

- (Ghana) André Ayew
- (Ghana) John Mensah
- (Guinea) Abdoul Camara
- (Guinea) Sadio Diallo
- (Libya) Ihaab Boussefi
- (Libya) Ahmed Saad Osman
- (Sudan) Mohamed Ahmed Bashir
- (Sudan) Mudather El Tahir
- (Tunisia) Youssef Msakni

1 goal

- (Angola) Mateus
- (Botswana) Mogakolodi Ngele
- (Botswana) Dipsy Selolwane
- (Burkina Faso) Issiaka Ouédraogo
- (Burkina Faso) Alain Traoré
- (Equatorial Guinea) Javier Balboa
- (Equatorial Guinea) Kily
- (Equatorial Guinea) Randy
- (Gabon) Daniel Cousin
- (Gabon) Bruno Zita Mbanangoyé
- (Gabon) Éric Mouloungui
- (Gabon) Stéphane N'Guéma
- (Ghana) Emmanuel Agyemang-Badu
- (Ghana) Asamoah Gyan
- (Guinea) Mamadou Bah
- (Guinea) Naby Soumah
- (Guinea) Ibrahima Traoré
- (Ivory Coast) Wilfried Bony
- (Ivory Coast) Emmanuel Eboué
- (Ivory Coast) Gervinho
- (Ivory Coast) Salomon Kalou
- (Ivory Coast) Yaya Touré
- (Mali) Garra Dembélé
- (Mali) Seydou Keita
- (Mali) Bakaye Traoré
- (Morocco) Younès Belhanda
- (Niger) William N'Gounou
- (Senegal) Deme N'Diaye
- (Senegal) Dame N'Doye
- (Senegal) Moussa Sow
- (Tunisia) Issam Jemâa
- (Tunisia) Saber Khelifa
- (Tunisia) Khaled Korbi
- (Zambia) James Chamanga
- (Zambia) Rainford Kalaba
- (Zambia) Stophira Sunzu

Own goal

- (Burkina Faso) Bakary Koné (playing against Ivory Coast)

== Mascot ==
The mascot for the 2012 Africa Cup of Nations was unveiled on 16 September 2011 at a ceremony in Libreville, Gabon. The mascot, named Gaguie, is a gorilla sporting the national team colors of Gabon and Equatorial Guinea.

== Match ball ==
The official match ball for the 2012 Africa Cup of Nations, manufactured by Adidas, was the Comoequa. The name was inspired by the Komo River, which runs through the host nations, and the Equator, which runs throughout Africa and unites the host nations.
