= Al Nasr Benghazi SC =

Libyan football club

Al-Nasr SCSC
- Full name: Al-Nasr Sports, Cultural and Social Club
- Nickname: Alfahama
- Founded: 1954; 72 years ago (officially 1957)
- Ground: Martyrs of February Stadium; Benghazi
- Capacity: 10,550
- Chairman: Ahmed Bouchnef
- Manager: Tarek El Ashry
- League: Libyan Premier League
- 2025-26: 2nd
Home colours	Away colours

Al-Nasr Sports, Cultural and Social Club (Arabic: نادي النصر الرياضي، ثقافي إجتماعي) or simply Al-Nasr Benghazi is a Libyan professional football club based in Benghazi.

== Honours ==
=== National titles ===
- Libyan Premier League
  - Winners (3): 1987, 2017–18, 2023–24
  - Runners-up (5): 1977–78, 1983–84, 2001–02, 2025–26
- Libyan Cup
  - Winners (3): 1997, 2003, 2010
- Libyan Super Cup
  - Winners (1) 2018
  - Runners-up (3): 1997, 2003, 2010

=== Regional titles ===
- North African Cup Winners Cup
  - Runners-up (1): 2010

== Performance in CAF competitions ==
- African Cup of Champions Clubs & CAF Champions League: 4 appearances

1988 – First Round
2018–19 – First Round
2019–20 – First Round
2020–21 – Preliminary Round

- CAF Confederation Cup: 3 appearances

2004 – First Round
2011 – withdrew in First Round
2019–20 – Quarter-finals

- CAF Cup: 1 appearance

2003 – Second Round

- CAF Cup Winners' Cup: 2 appearances

1979 – Second Round
1983 – First Round
1985 – withdrew in Semi-Finals

== Current squad ==
Note: Flags indicate national team as defined under FIFA eligibility rules; some limited exceptions apply. Players may hold more than one non-FIFA nationality.

No.	Pos.	Nation	Player
1	GK	LBA	Asil Al Mugassebi
4	DF	LBA	Younus Al-Hijazi
5	DF	NGR	Denis Nya
6	MF	LBA	Nasreddine Al Tawerghi
7	MF	LBA	Talha Rizaq
8	MF	LBA	Muhannad Etoo
10	FW	TAN	Kibu Denis
11	FW	LBA	Zakaria Alharaish
12	GK	LBA	Faraj Al-Ruayed
13	DF	LBA	Ahmad Fakroon
16	GK	LBA	Jawad Rizq
17	MF	COD	Fabrice Ngoma
18	MF	TUN	Saad Bguir
20	MF	LBA	Yahya Al-Zlitni
21	MF	LBA	Hazem Al-Madani
24	MF	LBA	Alaa El Qajdar

No.	Pos.	Nation	Player
27	FW	UGA	Steven Mukwala
28	DF	TUN	Mohamed Ali Jouini
30	FW	LBA	Aymen Hreibesh
32	DF	LBA	Moataz Al-Haddar
33	DF	LBA	Mohammed Al Hasi
—	DF	LBA	Jumaa Bourgiga
—	DF	LBA	Omran Dagdoug
—	GK	LBA	Hamza Al-Borjy
—	MF	TUN	Firas Sekkouhi
—	MF	LBA	Hamza Al-Rasheed
—	MF	LBA	Radwan Al-Tira
—	MF	LBA	Ismael Tajouri-Shradi
—	MF	MLI	Hamidou Traoré
—	FW	LBA	Saleh Al Taher
—	DF	LBA	Talal Farhat
—	FW	HAI	Duckens Nazon
