= 2013 Africa Cup of Nations squads =

The 2013 Africa Cup of Nations was an international football tournament held in South Africa from 19 January until 10 February 2013.

The Confederation of African Football confirmed 9 January as the deadline for final squad submissions ahead of the tournament. The African confederation wanted all 23-man squad lists sent to its Cairo headquarters by midnight GMT on 9 January. Failing to do so would result in a fine and infringing countries will only be allowed to take a 22-man squad to the finals.

Along with their 23-man squads, countries were allowed to bring a delegation of 17 officials.

== Group A ==
=== South Africa ===
Coach: Gordon Igesund

No.	Pos.	Player	Date of birth (age)	Caps	Goals	Club
1	GK	Wayne Sandilands	23 August 1983 (aged 29)	2	0	(South African Football Association) Mamelodi Sundowns
2	DF	Siboniso Gaxa	6 April 1984 (aged 28)	54	0	(South African Football Association) Kaizer Chiefs
3	DF	Tsepo Masilela	5 May 1985 (aged 27)	45	0	(South African Football Association) Kaizer Chiefs
4	DF	Thabo Nthethe	3 October 1984 (aged 28)	7	0	(South African Football Association) Bloemfontein Celtic
5	DF	Anele Ngcongca	20 October 1987 (aged 25)	22	0	(Royal Belgian Football Association) Racing Genk
6	MF	Lerato Chabangu	15 August 1985 (aged 27)	19	2	(South African Football Association) Moroka Swallows
7	FW	Lehlohonolo Majoro	19 August 1986 (aged 26)	6	1	(South African Football Association) Kaizer Chiefs
8	MF	Siphiwe Tshabalala	25 September 1984 (aged 28)	72	10	(South African Football Association) Kaizer Chiefs
9	FW	Katlego Mphela	29 November 1984 (aged 28)	50	23	(South African Football Association) Mamelodi Sundowns
10	MF	Thulani Serero	11 April 1990 (aged 22)	9	0	(Royal Dutch Football Association) Ajax
11	DF	Thabo Matlaba	13 December 1987 (aged 25)	4	0	(South African Football Association) Orlando Pirates
12	MF	Reneilwe Letsholonyane	9 June 1982 (aged 30)	34	1	(South African Football Association) Kaizer Chiefs
13	MF	Kagisho Dikgacoi	24 November 1984 (aged 28)	49	2	(The Football Association) Crystal Palace
14	DF	Bongani Khumalo (c)	6 January 1987 (aged 26)	34	1	(Hellenic Football Federation) PAOK
15	MF	Dean Furman	22 June 1988 (aged 24)	6	0	(The Football Association) Oldham Athletic
16	GK	Itumeleng Khune	20 June 1987 (aged 25)	50	0	(South African Football Association) Kaizer Chiefs
17	FW	Bernard Parker	16 March 1986 (aged 26)	49	12	(South African Football Association) Kaizer Chiefs
18	MF	Thuso Phala	27 May 1986 (aged 26)	4	0	(South African Football Association) Platinum Stars
19	MF	May Mahlangu	1 May 1989 (aged 23)	7	1	(Swedish Football Association) Helsingborgs IF
20	MF	Oupa Manyisa	30 July 1988 (aged 24)	7	0	(South African Football Association) Orlando Pirates
21	DF	Siyabonga Sangweni	29 September 1981 (aged 31)	25	2	(South African Football Association) Orlando Pirates
22	GK	Senzo Meyiwa	24 September 1987 (aged 25)	0	0	(South African Football Association) Orlando Pirates
23	FW	Tokelo Rantie	8 September 1990 (aged 22)	7	2	(Swedish Football Association) Malmö FF

=== Cape Verde ===
Coach: Lúcio Antunes

No.	Pos.	Player	Date of birth (age)	Caps	Goals	Club
1	GK	Vozinha	3 June 1986 (aged 26)	3	0	(Angolan Football Federation) Progresso do Sambizanga
2	MF	Sténio	6 May 1988 (aged 24)	3	0	(Portuguese Football Federation) Feirense
3	DF	Fernando Varela	26 November 1987 (aged 25)	19	2	(Romanian Football Federation) Vaslui
4	DF	Guy Ramos	16 August 1985 (aged 27)	11	0	(Royal Dutch Football Association) RKC Waalwijk
5	MF	Babanco	27 July 1985 (aged 27)	24	2	(Portuguese Football Federation) Olhanense
6	DF	Nando (c)	9 June 1978 (aged 34)	38	0	(French Football Federation) Châteauroux
7	FW	Platini	16 April 1986 (aged 26)	1	0	(Portuguese Football Federation) Santa Clara
8	MF	Toni Varela	13 June 1986 (aged 26)	13	0	(Royal Dutch Football Association) Sparta Rotterdam
9	FW	Rambé	4 October 1989 (aged 23)	1	0	(Portuguese Football Federation) Belenenses
10	FW	Héldon Ramos	14 November 1988 (aged 24)	16	4	(Portuguese Football Federation) Marítimo
11	FW	Júlio Tavares	19 November 1988 (aged 24)	1	0	(French Football Federation) Dijon
12	GK	Fock	25 July 1982 (aged 30)	10	0	(Cape Verdean Football Federation) Batuque
13	DF	Josimar Lima	2 August 1989 (aged 23)	3	0	(Royal Dutch Football Association) Dordrecht
14	DF	Gegé	24 February 1988 (aged 24)	9	0	(Portuguese Football Federation) Marítimo B
15	MF	Marco Soares	6 June 1984 (aged 28)	22	2	(Cyprus Football Association) Omonia
16	GK	Rilly	25 January 1992 (aged 20)	0	0	(Cape Verdean Football Federation) Mindelense
17	MF	Ronny	7 December 1978 (aged 34)	20	1	(Luxembourg Football Federation) Fola Esch
18	DF	Nivaldo	10 July 1988 (aged 24)	5	0	(Portuguese Football Federation) Académica de Coimbra
19	DF	Pecks	10 April 1993 (aged 19)	1	0	(Portuguese Football Federation) Gil Vicente
20	FW	Ryan Mendes	8 January 1990 (aged 23)	11	3	(French Football Federation) Lille
21	FW	Djaniny	21 March 1991 (aged 21)	7	2	(Portuguese Football Federation) Olhanense
22	FW	David Silva	11 October 1986 (aged 26)	2	0	(Portuguese Football Federation) Olhanense
23	DF	Carlitos	23 April 1985 (aged 27)	6	0	(Cyprus Football Association) AEL Limassol

=== Angola ===
Coach: (Uruguay) Gustavo Ferrín

No.	Pos.	Player	Date of birth (age)	Club
1	GK	Lamá	1 February 1981 (aged 31)	(Angolan Football Federation) Petro Atlético
2	DF	Marco Airosa	6 August 1984 (aged 28)	(Cyprus Football Association) AEL Limassol
3	DF	Lunguinha	16 January 1986 (aged 27)	(Angolan Football Federation) Kabuscorp
4	DF	Dani Massunguna	1 May 1986 (aged 26)	(Angolan Football Federation) 1º de Agosto
5	DF	Fabrício	20 September 1988 (aged 24)	(Angolan Football Federation) InterClube
6	MF	Dedé	4 July 1981 (aged 31)	(Cyprus Football Association) AEL Limassol
7	FW	Djalma	30 May 1987 (aged 25)	(Turkish Football Federation) Kasımpaşa
8	MF	Manucho Diniz	4 June 1986 (aged 26)	(Angolan Football Federation) 1º de Agosto
9	FW	Manucho Gonçalves (c)	7 March 1983 (aged 29)	(Royal Spanish Football Federation) Real Valladolid
10	DF	Zuela	3 August 1983 (aged 29)	(Cyprus Football Association) APOEL
11	MF	Gilberto	21 September 1982 (aged 30)	(Cyprus Football Association) AEL Limassol
12	GK	Landú	4 January 1990 (aged 23)	(Angolan Football Federation) C.R.D. Libolo
13	DF	Bastos	23 November 1991 (aged 21)	(Angolan Football Federation) Petro Atlético
14	DF	Amaro	12 November 1986 (aged 26)	(Angolan Football Federation) 1º de Agosto
15	DF	Miguel	17 November 1991 (aged 21)	(Angolan Football Federation) Petro Atlético
16	MF	Pirolito	7 April 1993 (aged 19)	(Angolan Football Federation) InterClube
17	FW	Mateus Galiano	18 January 1984 (aged 29)	(Portuguese Football Federation) Nacional
18	MF	Geraldo	23 November 1991 (aged 21)	(Brazilian Football Confederation) Paraná Clube
19	FW	Yano	8 July 1992 (aged 20)	(Angolan Football Federation) Progresso do Sambizanga
20	DF	Mingo Bile	15 June 1987 (aged 25)	(Angolan Football Federation) 1º de Agosto
21	MF	Manuel	30 December 1989 (aged 23)	(Angolan Football Federation) ASA
22	GK	Neblú	16 December 1993 (aged 19)	(Angolan Football Federation) 1º de Agosto
23	FW	Guilherme Afonso	15 November 1985 (aged 27)	(Liechtenstein Football Association) Vaduz

=== Morocco ===
Coach: Rachid Taoussi

No.	Pos.	Player	Date of birth (age)	Caps	Goals	Club
1	GK	Nadir Lamyaghri (c)	13 February 1976 (aged 36)	50	0	(Royal Moroccan Football Federation) Wydad Casablanca
2	DF	Abderrahim Achchakir	15 December 1986 (aged 26)	0	0	(Royal Moroccan Football Federation) FAR Rabat
3	DF	Zakaria Bergdich	7 January 1989 (aged 24)	8	0	(French Football Federation) Lens
4	DF	Ahmed Kantari	28 June 1985 (aged 27)	8	0	(French Football Federation) Brest
5	DF	Mehdi Benatia	17 April 1987 (aged 25)	25	1	(Italian Football Federation) Udinese
6	MF	Adil Hermach	27 June 1986 (aged 26)	18	0	(Saudi Arabian Football Federation) Al Hilal
7	MF	Abdelaziz Barrada	19 June 1989 (aged 23)	8	1	(Royal Spanish Football Federation) Getafe
8	MF	Karim El Ahmadi	27 January 1985 (aged 27)	17	1	(The Football Association) Aston Villa
9	FW	Youssef El-Arabi	3 February 1987 (aged 25)	15	3	(Royal Spanish Football Federation) Granada
10	MF	Younès Belhanda	25 February 1990 (aged 22)	17	1	(French Football Federation) Montpellier
11	FW	Oussama Assaidi	15 August 1988 (aged 24)	9	1	(The Football Association) Liverpool
12	GK	Anas Zniti	28 October 1988 (aged 24)	0	0	(Royal Moroccan Football Federation) MAS Fez
13	FW	Youssef Kaddioui	28 September 1984 (aged 28)	0	0	(Royal Moroccan Football Federation) FAR Rabat
14	FW	Mounir El Hamdaoui	14 July 1984 (aged 28)	11	2	(Italian Football Federation) Fiorentina
15	DF	Abdelhamid El Kaoutari	17 March 1990 (aged 22)	4	0	(French Football Federation) Montpellier
16	DF	Abdelatif Noussir	20 February 1990 (aged 22)	1	0	(Royal Moroccan Football Federation) MAS Fez
17	DF	Issam El Adoua	12 September 1986 (aged 26)	8	0	(Portuguese Football Federation) Vitória de Guimarães
18	MF	Chahir Belghazouani	6 October 1986 (aged 26)	1	0	(French Football Federation) Ajaccio
19	MF	Kamel Chafni	11 June 1982 (aged 30)	4	0	(French Football Federation) Brest
20	FW	Abderrazak Hamdallah	17 December 1990 (aged 22)	2	0	(Royal Moroccan Football Federation) Olympique Safi
21	FW	Nordin Amrabat	31 March 1987 (aged 25)	11	2	(Turkish Football Federation) Galatasaray
22	GK	Khalid Askri	20 March 1981 (aged 31)	0	0	(Royal Moroccan Football Federation) Raja Casablanca
23	MF	Abdelilah Hafidi	14 May 1992 (aged 20)	0	0	(Royal Moroccan Football Federation) Raja Casablanca

== Group B ==
=== Ghana ===
Coach: James Kwesi Appiah

No.	Pos.	Player	Date of birth (age)	Caps	Goals	Club
1	GK	Daniel Agyei	10 November 1989 (aged 23)	5	0	(Ghana Football Association) Liberty Professionals
2	DF	Richard Boateng	25 November 1988 (aged 24)	2	0	(Ghana Football Association) Berekum Chelsea
3	FW	Asamoah Gyan (c)	22 November 1985 (aged 27)	64	30	(United Arab Emirates Football Association) Al-Ain
4	MF	John Paintsil	15 June 1981 (aged 31)	84	0	(Israel Football Association) Hapoel Tel Aviv
5	DF	Mohamed Awal	1 May 1988 (aged 24)	0	0	(South African Football Association) Maritzburg United
6	MF	Anthony Annan	21 July 1986 (aged 26)	64	2	(Royal Spanish Football Federation) Osasuna
7	FW	Christian Atsu	10 January 1992 (aged 21)	9	2	(Portuguese Football Federation) Porto
8	MF	Emmanuel Agyemang-Badu	2 December 1990 (aged 22)	35	5	(Italian Football Federation) Udinese
9	MF	Derek Boateng	2 May 1983 (aged 29)	42	1	(Ukrainian Association of Football) Dnipro Dnipropetrovsk
10	MF	Albert Adomah	13 December 1987 (aged 25)	5	1	(The Football Association) Bristol City
11	MF	Mohammed Rabiu	31 December 1989 (aged 23)	4	0	(French Football Federation) Evian
12	GK	Adam Larsen Kwarasey	12 December 1987 (aged 25)	18	0	(Norwegian Football Federation) Strømsgodset
13	DF	Jerry Akaminko	2 May 1988 (aged 24)	4	1	(Turkish Football Federation) Eskişehirspor
14	MF	Solomon Asante	15 September 1990 (aged 22)	6	0	(Ghana Football Association) Berekum Chelsea
15	MF	Isaac Vorsah	21 June 1988 (aged 24)	37	1	(Austrian Football Association) Red Bull Salzburg
16	GK	Abdul Fatawu Dauda	6 April 1985 (aged 27)	5	0	(Ghana Football Association) Ashanti Gold
17	FW	Emmanuel Clottey	30 August 1987 (aged 25)	6	0	(Tunisian Football Federation) ES Tunis
18	FW	Richmond Boakye	28 January 1993 (aged 19)	5	2	(Italian Football Federation) Sassuolo
19	DF	Jonathan Mensah	13 July 1990 (aged 22)	19	1	(French Football Federation) Evian
20	MF	Kwadwo Asamoah	9 December 1988 (aged 24)	47	1	(Italian Football Federation) Juventus
21	DF	John Boye	23 April 1987 (aged 25)	17	1	(French Football Federation) Rennes
22	FW	Mubarak Wakaso	25 July 1990 (aged 22)	3	2	(Royal Spanish Football Federation) Espanyol
23	DF	Harrison Afful	24 June 1986 (aged 26)	26	0	(Tunisian Football Federation) ES Tunis

=== Mali ===
Coach: (France) Patrice Carteron

No.	Pos.	Player	Date of birth (age)	Caps	Goals	Club
1	GK	Mamadou Samassa	16 February 1990 (aged 22)	1	0	(Football Association of Malaysia) Kajang FC
2	DF	Fousseni Diawara	28 August 1980 (aged 32)	37	0	(French Football Federation) Ajaccio
3	DF	Adama Tamboura	18 May 1985 (aged 27)	60	0	(Danish Football Association) Randers
4	DF	Adama Coulibaly	10 September 1980 (aged 32)	61	1	(French Football Federation) Auxerre
5	DF	Idrissa Coulibaly	19 December 1987 (aged 25)	6	0	(Qatar Football Association) Lekhwiya
6	MF	Mohamed Sissoko	22 January 1985 (aged 27)	28	2	(French Football Federation) Paris Saint-Germain
7	FW	Cheick Fantamady Diarra	11 February 1992 (aged 20)	5	0	(French Football Federation) Rennes
8	MF	Mohamed Kalilou Traoré	9 September 1987 (aged 25)	13	1	(French Football Federation) Sochaux
9	FW	Cheick Diabaté	25 April 1988 (aged 24)	23	11	(French Football Federation) Bordeaux
10	FW	Modibo Maïga	3 September 1987 (aged 25)	36	7	(The Football Association) West Ham United
11	MF	Sigamary Diarra	10 January 1984 (aged 29)	10	0	(French Football Federation) Ajaccio
12	MF	Seydou Keita (c)	16 January 1980 (aged 33)	—	—	(Chinese Football Association) Dalian Aerbin
13	DF	Molla Wague	21 February 1991 (aged 21)	0	0	(French Football Federation) Caen
14	MF	Sambou Yatabaré	2 March 1989 (aged 23)	5	0	(French Football Federation) Bastia
15	FW	Mamadou Samassa	1 May 1986 (aged 26)	7	1	(Italian Football Federation) Chievo
16	GK	Soumbeïla Diakité	25 August 1984 (aged 28)	27	0	(Malian Football Federation) Stade Malien
17	MF	Mahamane Traoré	31 August 1988 (aged 24)	23	2	(French Football Federation) Metz
18	MF	Samba Sow	29 April 1989 (aged 23)	19	0	(French Football Federation) Lens
19	DF	Salif Coulibaly	12 June 1993 (aged 19)	1	0	(Malian Football Federation) Djoliba
20	MF	Samba Diakité	24 January 1989 (aged 23)	5	0	(The Football Association) Queens Park Rangers
21	DF	Mahamadou N'Diaye	21 June 1990 (aged 22)	7	2	(Portuguese Football Federation) Vitória de Guimarães
22	GK	Aly Yirango	4 January 1994 (aged 19)	0	0	(Malian Football Federation) Djoliba
23	DF	Ousmane Coulibaly	9 July 1989 (aged 23)	7	0	(French Football Federation) Brest

=== Niger ===
Coach: (Germany) Gernot Rohr

No.	Pos.	Player	Date of birth (age)	Club
1	GK	Moussa Alzouma	30 September 1982 (aged 30)	(Nigerien Football Federation) AS GNN
2	FW	Moussa Maâzou (c)	25 August 1988 (aged 24)	(Tunisian Football Federation) ÉS Sahel
3	MF	Lassina Abdoul Karim	20 May 1987 (age 39)	(Cameroonian Football Federation) Coton Sport
4	DF	Kader Amadou	5 April 1989 (aged 23)	(Nigerien Football Federation) Olympic Niamey
5	DF	Luky James	23 July 1992 (aged 20)	(Nigerien Football Federation) AS Douane
6	MF	Idrissa Laouali	11 September 1979 (aged 33)	(Nigerien Football Federation) ASFAN
7	FW	Modibo Sidibé	5 December 1985 (aged 27)	Unattached
8	MF	Kourouma Fatoukouma	11 July 1984 (aged 28)	(Royal Moroccan Football Federation) CR Al Hoceima
9	FW	Kamilou Daouda	29 December 1987 (aged 25)	(Algerian Football Federation) JS Saoura
10	MF	Boubacar Talatou	12 March 1987 (aged 25)	(Nigerien Football Federation) AS GNN
11	FW	Alhassane Issoufou	1 January 1981 (aged 32)	(Royal Moroccan Football Federation) Widad Fez
12	MF	Souleymane Dela Sacko	1 August 1987 (aged 25)	(Gabonese Football Federation) Mangasport
13	DF	Mohamed Chikoto	28 February 1989 (age 37)	(Tunisian Football Federation) AS Marsa
14	MF	Issoufou Boubacar Garba	2 February 1990 (aged 22)	(Tunisian Football Federation) CS Hammam-Lif
15	DF	Ismaël Alassane	3 April 1984 (aged 28)	(Kuwait Football Association) Al Sahel
16	GK	Kassaly Daouda	19 August 1983 (aged 29)	(South African Football Association) Chippa United
17	MF	William N'Gounou	31 July 1983 (aged 29)	(Swedish Football Association) IF Limhamn Bunkeflo
18	FW	Koffi Dan Kowa	19 September 1989 (aged 23)	(Tunisian Football Federation) ES Zarzis
19	MF	Issiaka Koudize	3 January 1987 (aged 26)	(Nigerien Football Federation) AS GNN
20	FW	Amadou Moutari	19 January 1994 (aged 19)	(French Football Federation) Le Mans B
21	DF	Mohamed Bachar	6 November 1992 (aged 20)	(Nigerien Football Federation) AS Douane
22	GK	Saminou Rabo	23 August 1981 (aged 31)	(Nigerien Football Federation) Sahel
23	DF	Mohamed Soumaïla	30 October 1994 (aged 18)	(Nigerien Football Federation) Olympic Niamey

=== DR Congo ===
Coach: (France) Claude Le Roy

No.	Pos.	Player	Date of birth (age)	Club
1	GK	Muteba Kidiaba	1 February 1976 (aged 36)	(Congolese Association Football Federation) TP Mazembe
2	DF	Mpeko Issama	3 March 1986 (aged 26)	(Congolese Association Football Federation) Vita Club
3	DF	Kilitcho Kasusula	5 August 1986 (aged 26)	(Congolese Association Football Federation) TP Mazembe
4	MF	Mulota Kabangu	31 December 1985 (aged 27)	(Congolese Association Football Federation) TP Mazembe
5	DF	Larrys Mabiala	8 October 1987 (aged 25)	(Turkish Football Federation) Karabükspor
6	MF	Budge Manzia	24 September 1994 (aged 18)	(Congolese Association Football Federation) Sharks XI
7	MF	Youssouf Mulumbu	25 January 1987 (aged 25)	(The Football Association) West Bromwich Albion
8	FW	Trésor Mputu (c)	10 December 1985 (aged 27)	(Congolese Association Football Federation) TP Mazembe
9	FW	Dieumerci Mbokani	22 November 1985 (aged 27)	(Royal Belgian Football Association) Anderlecht
10	MF	Zola Matumona	26 November 1981 (aged 31)	(Royal Belgian Football Association) Mons
11	FW	Déo Kanda	11 August 1989 (aged 23)	(Congolese Association Football Federation) TP Mazembe
12	MF	Yves Diba Ilunga	12 August 1987 (aged 25)	(Saudi Arabian Football Federation) Al-Raed
13	FW	Dioko Kaluyituka	2 January 1987 (aged 26)	(Qatar Football Association) Al Kharaitiyat
14	DF	Landry Mulemo	17 September 1986 (aged 26)	(Royal Belgian Football Association) Kortrijk
15	FW	Lomana LuaLua	28 December 1980 (aged 32)	(Turkish Football Federation) Karabükspor
16	GK	Parfait Mandanda	10 October 1989 (aged 23)	(Royal Belgian Football Association) Charleroi
17	DF	Cédric Mongongu	22 June 1989 (aged 23)	(French Football Federation) Evian
18	MF	Cédric Makiadi	23 February 1984 (aged 28)	(German Football Association) SC Freiburg
19	DF	Chancel Mbemba	8 August 1994 (aged 18)	(Royal Belgian Football Association) Anderlecht
20	FW	Héritier Luvumbu Nzinga	23 December 1987 (aged 25)	(Congolese Association Football Federation) Rojolu Lukaku
21	DF	Gabriel Zakuani	31 May 1986 (aged 26)	(The Football Association) Peterborough United
22	MF	Makuntima Kisombe	10 October 1992 (aged 20)	(Congolese Association Football Federation) DC Motema Pembe
23	GK	Cédrick Bakala Landu	3 March 1992 (aged 20)	(Congolese Association Football Federation) FC MK Etanchéité

== Group C ==
=== Zambia ===
Coach: (France) Hervé Renard

No.	Pos.	Player	Date of birth (age)	Club
1	GK	Joshua Titima	20 October 1992 (aged 20)	(Football Association of Zambia) Power Dynamos
2	DF	Francis Kasonde	1 September 1986 (aged 26)	(Congolese Association Football Federation) TP Mazembe
3	MF	Chisamba Lungu	31 January 1991 (aged 21)	(Russian Football Union) Ural Sverdlovsk Oblast
4	DF	Joseph Musonda	30 May 1977 (aged 35)	(South African Football Association) Golden Arrows
5	DF	Hijani Himoonde	15 June 1985 (aged 27)	(Congolese Association Football Federation) TP Mazembe
6	DF	Davies Nkausu	1 January 1986 (aged 27)	(South African Football Association) SuperSport United
7	FW	Jacob Mulenga	12 February 1984 (aged 28)	(Royal Dutch Football Association) Utrecht
8	MF	Isaac Chansa	23 March 1984 (aged 28)	(Chinese Football Association) Henan Jianye
9	FW	Collins Mbesuma	3 February 1984 (aged 28)	(South African Football Association) Orlando Pirates
10	MF	Felix Katongo	18 April 1984 (aged 28)	(Angolan Football Federation) Petro Atlético
11	FW	Christopher Katongo (c)	31 August 1982 (aged 30)	(Chinese Football Association) Henan Jianye
12	FW	James Chamanga	2 February 1980 (aged 32)	(Chinese Football Association) Liaoning Whowin
13	DF	Stophira Sunzu	22 June 1989 (aged 23)	(Congolese Association Football Federation) TP Mazembe
14	MF	Noah Chivuta	25 December 1983 (aged 29)	(South African Football Association) Free State Stars
15	MF	William Njovu	4 March 1987 (aged 25)	(Israel Football Association) Hapoel Be'er Sheva
16	GK	Kennedy Mweene	12 November 1984 (aged 28)	(South African Football Association) Free State Stars
17	MF	Rainford Kalaba	14 August 1986 (aged 26)	(Congolese Association Football Federation) TP Mazembe
18	DF	Emmanuel Mbola	10 May 1993 (aged 19)	(Portuguese Football Federation) Porto
19	DF	Nathan Sinkala	23 April 1991 (aged 21)	(Congolese Association Football Federation) TP Mazembe
20	FW	Emmanuel Mayuka	21 November 1990 (aged 22)	(The Football Association) Southampton
21	MF	Jonas Sakuwaha	22 July 1983 (aged 29)	(Sudan Football Association) Al-Merreikh
22	GK	Danny Munyao	21 January 1987 (aged 25)	(Football Association of Zambia) Red Arrows
23	MF	Mukuka Mulenga	7 June 1993 (aged 19)	(Football Association of Zambia) Power Dynamos

=== Nigeria ===
Coach: Stephen Keshi

No.	Pos.	Player	Date of birth (age)	Caps	Goals	Club
1	GK	Vincent Enyeama	29 August 1982 (aged 30)	70	1	(Israel Football Association) Maccabi Tel Aviv
2	DF	Joseph Yobo (c)	6 September 1980 (aged 32)	88	7	(Turkish Football Federation) Fenerbahçe
3	DF	Elderson Echiéjilé	20 January 1988 (aged 24)	19	0	(Portuguese Football Federation) Braga
4	MF	Nwankwo Obiorah	18 June 1989 (aged 23)	6	0	(Italian Football Federation) Padova
5	DF	Efe Ambrose	18 October 1988 (aged 24)	16	1	(Scottish Football Association) Celtic
6	DF	Azubuike Egwuekwe	28 November 1988 (aged 24)	12	0	(Nigeria Football Federation) Warri Wolves
7	FW	Ahmed Musa	14 October 1992 (aged 20)	19	3	(Russian Football Union) CSKA Moscow
8	FW	Brown Ideye	10 October 1988 (aged 24)	5	1	(Hellenic Football Federation) Olympiakos
9	FW	Emmanuel Emenike	10 May 1987 (aged 25)	8	1	(Russian Football Union) Spartak Moscow
10	MF	John Obi Mikel	22 April 1987 (aged 25)	38	3	(The Football Association) Chelsea
11	FW	Victor Moses	12 December 1990 (aged 22)	6	2	(The Football Association) Chelsea
12	MF	Reuben Gabriel	25 September 1990 (aged 22)	10	1	(Nigeria Football Federation) Kano Pillars
13	MF	Fegor Ogude	29 July 1987 (aged 25)	7	0	(Norwegian Football Federation) Vålerenga
14	DF	Godfrey Oboabona	16 August 1990 (aged 22)	11	0	(Nigeria Football Federation) Sunshine Stars
15	FW	Ikechukwu Uche	5 January 1984 (aged 29)	40	18	(Royal Spanish Football Federation) Villarreal
16	GK	Austin Ejide	8 April 1984 (aged 28)	23	0	(Israel Football Association) Hapoel Be'er Sheva
17	MF	Ogenyi Onazi	25 December 1992 (aged 20)	2	1	(Italian Football Federation) Lazio
18	MF	Ejike Uzoenyi	23 March 1988 (aged 24)	11	0	(Nigeria Football Federation) Enugu Rangers
19	MF	Sunday Mba	28 November 1988 (aged 24)	6	3	(Nigeria Football Federation) Enugu Rangers
20	MF	Nosa Igiebor	9 November 1990 (aged 22)	5	2	(Royal Spanish Football Federation) Real Betis
21	DF	Juwon Oshaniwa	14 September 1990 (aged 22)	8	0	(Israel Football Association) Ashdod
22	DF	Kenneth Omeruo	17 October 1993 (aged 19)	0	0	(Royal Dutch Football Association) ADO Den Haag
23	GK	Chigozie Agbim	28 November 1984 (aged 28)	5	0	(Nigeria Football Federation) Enugu Rangers

=== Burkina Faso ===
Coach: (Belgium) Paul Put

No.	Pos.	Player	Date of birth (age)	Club
1	GK	Daouda Diakité	30 March 1983 (aged 29)	(Royal Belgian Football Association) Lierse
2	FW	Hugues-Wilfried Dah	10 July 1986 (aged 26)	(United Arab Emirates Football Association) Al-Dhaid Club
3	DF	Henri Traoré	13 April 1983 (aged 29)	(Ghana Football Association) Ashanti Gold
4	DF	Bakary Koné	27 April 1988 (aged 24)	(French Football Federation) Lyon
5	MF	Mohamed Koffi	30 December 1986 (aged 26)	(Egyptian Football Association) PetroJet
6	MF	Djakaridja Koné	22 July 1986 (aged 26)	(French Football Federation) Évian
7	DF	Florent Rouamba	31 December 1986 (aged 26)	(Moldovan Football Federation) Sheriff Tiraspol
8	DF	Paul Koulibaly	24 March 1986 (aged 26)	(Romanian Football Federation) Dinamo București
9	FW	Moumouni Dagano (c)	3 January 1981 (aged 32)	(Qatar Football Association) Al-Sailiya
10	FW	Alain Traoré	31 December 1988 (aged 24)	(French Football Federation) Lorient
11	MF	Jonathan Pitroipa	12 April 1986 (aged 26)	(French Football Federation) Rennes
12	DF	Saïdou Panandétiguiri	22 March 1984 (aged 28)	(Royal Belgian Football Association) Royal Antwerp
13	MF	Issouf Ouattara	7 October 1988 (aged 24)	(Bulgarian Football Union) Chernomorets Burgas
14	DF	Benjamin Balima	20 March 1985 (aged 27)	(Moldovan Football Federation) Sheriff Tiraspol
15	FW	Aristide Bancé	19 September 1984 (aged 28)	(German Football Association) FC Augsburg
16	GK	Abdoulaye Soulama	29 November 1979 (aged 33)	(Ghana Football Association) Asante Kotoko
17	MF	Ali Rabo	6 June 1986 (aged 26)	(Egyptian Football Association) El-Shorta
18	MF	Charles Kaboré	9 February 1988 (aged 24)	(French Football Federation) Marseille
19	FW	Pierre Koulibaly	24 March 1986 (aged 26)	(United Arab Emirates Football Association) Al-Dhaid Club
20	FW	Wilfried Sanou	16 March 1984 (aged 28)	(Japan Football Association) Kyoto Sanga
21	MF	Abdou Razack Traoré	28 December 1988 (aged 24)	(Turkish Football Federation) Gaziantepspor
22	FW	Prejuce Nakoulma	21 April 1987 (aged 25)	(Polish Football Association) Górnik Zabrze
23	GK	Germain Sanou	26 May 1992 (aged 20)	(French Football Federation) Saint-Étienne II

=== Ethiopia ===
Coach: Sewnet Bishaw

No.	Pos.	Player	Date of birth (age)	Club
1	GK	Sisay Bancha	25 June 1985 (aged 27)	(Ethiopian Football Federation) Ethiopian Coffee
2	DF	Degu Debebe (c)	19 March 1984 (aged 28)	(Ethiopian Football Federation) Saint George
3	MF	Yared Zinabu	22 June 1989 (aged 23)	(Ethiopian Football Federation) Saint George
4	DF	Abebaw Butako	20 April 1987 (aged 25)	(Ethiopian Football Federation) Saint George
5	DF	Aynalem Hailu	12 October 1986 (aged 26)	(Ethiopian Football Federation) Dedebit
6	DF	Alula Girma	15 July 1993 (aged 19)	(Ethiopian Football Federation) Saint George
7	FW	Saladin Said	29 October 1988 (aged 24)	(Egyptian Football Association) Wadi Degla
8	MF	Asrat Megersa	20 June 1987 (aged 25)	(Ethiopian Football Federation) EEPCO
9	FW	Getaneh Kebede	2 April 1992 (aged 20)	(Ethiopian Football Federation) Dedebit
10	DF	Birhanu Bogale	27 February 1986 (aged 26)	(Ethiopian Football Federation) Dedebit
11	FW	Oumed Oukri	5 December 1990 (aged 22)	(Ethiopian Football Federation) Defence
12	DF	Biyadiglign Elyas	24 May 1988 (aged 24)	(Ethiopian Football Federation) Saint George
13	FW	Fuad Ibrahim	15 August 1991 (aged 21)	(United States Soccer Federation) Minnesota Stars
14	MF	Minyahil Teshome	14 November 1985 (aged 27)	(Ethiopian Football Federation) Dedebit
15	FW	Dawit Estifanos	27 February 1988 (aged 24)	(Ethiopian Football Federation) Ethiopian Coffee
16	MF	Yussuf Saleh	22 March 1984 (aged 28)	(Swedish Football Association) Syrianska
17	DF	Seyoum Tesfaye	19 December 1989 (aged 23)	(Ethiopian Football Federation) Dedebit
18	MF	Shimelis Bekele	17 October 1990 (aged 22)	(Ethiopian Football Federation) Saint George
19	FW	Adane Girma	25 June 1985 (aged 27)	(Ethiopian Football Federation) Saint George
20	MF	Behailu Assefa	30 December 1989 (aged 23)	(Ethiopian Football Federation) Dedebit
21	MF	Addis Hintsa	30 June 1987 (aged 25)	(Ethiopian Football Federation) Dedebit
22	GK	Jemal Tassew	27 April 1989 (aged 23)	(Ethiopian Football Federation) Dedebit
23	GK	Zerihun Tadele	31 October 1989 (aged 23)	(Ethiopian Football Federation) Defence

== Group D ==
=== Ivory Coast ===
Coach: (France) Sabri Lamouchi

No.	Pos.	Player	Date of birth (age)	Caps	Goals	Club
1	GK	Boubacar Barry	30 December 1979 (aged 33)	68	0	(Royal Belgian Football Association) Lokeren
2	FW	Arouna Koné	11 November 1983 (aged 29)	37	9	(The Football Association) Wigan Athletic
3	DF	Arthur Boka	2 April 1983 (aged 29)	71	1	(German Football Association) VfB Stuttgart
4	DF	Kolo Touré	19 March 1981 (aged 31)	103	6	(The Football Association) Manchester City
5	MF	Didier Zokora	14 December 1980 (aged 32)	106	1	(Turkish Football Federation) Trabzonspor
6	MF	Romaric	4 June 1983 (aged 29)	39	5	(Royal Spanish Football Federation) Real Zaragoza
7	MF	Abdul Razak	11 November 1992 (aged 20)	3	0	(The Football Association) Manchester City
8	FW	Salomon Kalou	5 August 1985 (aged 27)	52	20	(French Football Federation) Lille
9	MF	Cheick Tioté	21 June 1986 (aged 26)	34	0	(The Football Association) Newcastle United
10	FW	Gervinho	27 May 1987 (aged 25)	43	11	(The Football Association) Arsenal
11	FW	Didier Drogba (c)	11 March 1978 (aged 34)	90	59	(Turkish Football Federation) Galatasaray
12	FW	Wilfried Bony	10 December 1988 (aged 24)	15	4	(Royal Dutch Football Association) Vitesse
13	MF	Didier Ya Konan	25 February 1984 (aged 28)	19	7	(German Football Association) Hannover 96
14	DF	Ismaël Traoré	18 August 1986 (aged 26)	1	0	(French Football Federation) Brest
15	FW	Max Gradel	30 November 1987 (aged 25)	19	2	(French Football Federation) Saint-Étienne
16	GK	Daniel Yeboah	13 November 1984 (aged 28)	12	0	(French Football Federation) Dijon
17	MF	Siaka Tiéné	22 February 1982 (aged 30)	82	2	(French Football Federation) Paris Saint-Germain
18	FW	Lacina Traoré	20 May 1990 (aged 22)	2	2	(Russian Football Union) Anzhi Makhachkala
19	MF	Yaya Touré	13 May 1983 (aged 29)	72	10	(The Football Association) Manchester City
20	DF	Igor Lolo	22 July 1982 (aged 30)	20	0	(Russian Football Union) Kuban Krasnodar
21	DF	Emmanuel Eboué	4 June 1983 (aged 29)	74	3	(Turkish Football Federation) Galatasaray
22	DF	Sol Bamba	13 January 1985 (aged 28)	33	2	(Turkish Football Federation) Trabzonspor
23	GK	Badra Ali Sangaré	30 May 1986 (aged 26)	1	0	(Ivorian Football Federation) Séwé Sports de San Pedro

=== Tunisia ===
Coach: Sami Trabelsi

No.	Pos.	Player	Date of birth (age)	Caps	Goals	Club
1	GK	Farouk Ben Mustapha	1 July 1989 (aged 23)	2	0	(Tunisian Football Federation) Bizertin
2	DF	Bilel Ifa	9 March 1990 (aged 22)	20	0	(Tunisian Football Federation) Club Africain
3	DF	Walid Hichri	5 March 1986 (aged 26)	12	1	(Tunisian Football Federation) ES Tunis
4	MF	Hatten Baratli	9 January 1991 (aged 22)	4	0	(Tunisian Football Federation) Club Africain
5	MF	Chamseddine Dhaouadi	15 January 1987 (aged 26)	4	0	(Tunisian Football Federation) ÉS Sahel
6	DF	Fateh Gharbi	12 March 1983 (aged 29)	9	1	(Tunisian Football Federation) Sfaxien
7	MF	Youssef Msakni	28 October 1990 (aged 22)	18	3	(Qatar Football Association) Lekhwiya
8	DF	Chadi Hammami	14 June 1986 (aged 26)	23	1	(Kuwait Football Association) Kuwait SC
9	FW	Hamdi Harbaoui	5 January 1985 (aged 28)	9	4	(Royal Belgian Football Association) Lokeren
10	MF	Oussama Darragi	3 April 1987 (aged 25)	37	7	(Swiss Football Association) Sion
11	FW	Fakhreddine Ben Youssef	21 June 1991 (aged 21)	4	1	(Tunisian Football Federation) Sfaxien
12	DF	Khalil Chemmam (c)	24 July 1987 (aged 25)	19	0	(Tunisian Football Federation) ES Tunis
13	MF	Wissem Ben Yahia	9 September 1984 (aged 28)	32	3	(Turkish Football Federation) Mersin İdmanyurdu
14	MF	Mejdi Traoui	13 December 1983 (aged 29)	35	1	(Tunisian Football Federation) ES Tunis
15	FW	Zouheir Dhaouadi	1 January 1988 (aged 25)	29	3	(French Football Federation) Evian
16	GK	Aymen Mathlouthi	14 September 1984 (aged 28)	41	0	(Tunisian Football Federation) ÉS Sahel
17	FW	Issam Jemâa	28 January 1984 (aged 28)	71	34	(Kuwait Football Association) Kuwait SC
18	DF	Anis Boussaïdi	10 April 1981 (aged 31)	31	0	(Ukrainian Association of Football) Tavriya Simferopol
19	FW	Saber Khelifa	14 October 1986 (aged 26)	18	5	(French Football Federation) Evian
20	DF	Aymen Abdennour	6 August 1989 (aged 23)	23	1	(French Football Federation) Toulouse
21	MF	Khaled Mouelhi	13 February 1981 (aged 31)	9	0	(Tunisian Football Federation) ES Tunis
22	GK	Moez Ben Cherifia	24 June 1991 (aged 21)	3	0	(Tunisian Football Federation) ES Tunis
23	MF	Wahbi Khazri	8 February 1991 (aged 21)	3	0	(French Football Federation) Bastia

=== Algeria ===
Coach: (Bosnia and Herzegovina) Vahid Halilhodžić

A 40-man provisional squad was announced on 10 December 2012. A 24-man list was announced on 18 December 2012, with Ishak Belfodil, Mokhtar Benmoussa, Antar Boucherit, Madjid Bougherra, Hamza Boulemdaïs, Ismaël Bouzid, Farouk Chafaï, Abdelmoumene Djabou, Moustapha Djallit, Rafik Djebbour, Ahmed Gasmi, Abderahmane Hachoud, Féthi Harek, Hamza Koudri and Lamine Zemmamouche being left out of the team. On 22 December 2012, Djamel Abdoun dropped out of the squad after an injury, thus leaving the team with a final 23-man squad.

No.	Pos.	Player	Date of birth (age)	Caps	Goals	Club
1	GK	Azzedine Doukha	5 August 1986 (aged 26)	2	0	(Algerian Football Federation) USM El Harrach
2	MF	Mehdi Mostefa	30 August 1983 (aged 29)	10	0	(French Football Federation) Ajaccio
3	DF	Liassine Cadamuro	5 March 1988 (aged 24)	4	0	(Royal Spanish Football Federation) Real Sociedad
4	DF	Essaïd Belkalem	1 January 1989 (aged 24)	4	0	(Algerian Football Federation) JS Kabylie
5	DF	Rafik Halliche	2 September 1986 (aged 26)	22	1	(Portuguese Football Federation) Académica de Coimbra
6	DF	Djamel Mesbah	9 October 1984 (aged 28)	16	0	(Italian Football Federation) Milan
7	MF	Ryad Boudebouz	19 February 1990 (aged 22)	15	1	(French Football Federation) Sochaux
8	MF	Mehdi Lacen (c)	15 May 1984 (aged 28)	19	0	(Royal Spanish Football Federation) Getafe
9	FW	Islam Slimani	18 June 1988 (aged 24)	7	5	(Algerian Football Federation) CR Belouizdad
10	MF	Sofiane Feghouli	26 December 1989 (aged 23)	9	2	(Royal Spanish Football Federation) Valencia
11	FW	Hameur Bouazza	22 February 1985 (aged 27)	21	3	(Royal Spanish Football Federation) Racing Santander
12	DF	Carl Medjani	15 May 1985 (aged 27)	15	0	(French Football Federation) Ajaccio
13	FW	Amine Aoudia	6 June 1987 (aged 25)	5	0	(Algerian Football Federation) ES Sétif
14	MF	Foued Kadir	5 December 1983 (aged 29)	16	2	(French Football Federation) Marseille
15	FW	Hillal Soudani	25 November 1987 (aged 25)	9	6	(Portuguese Football Federation) Vitória de Guimarães
16	GK	Cédric Si Mohamed	9 January 1985 (aged 28)	1	0	(Algerian Football Federation) JSM Béjaïa
17	MF	Adlène Guedioura	12 November 1985 (aged 27)	18	1	(The Football Association) Nottingham Forest
18	MF	Khaled Lemmouchia	6 December 1981 (aged 31)	25	0	(Tunisian Football Federation) Club Africain
19	MF	Yacine Bezzaz	10 August 1981 (aged 31)	22	3	(Algerian Football Federation) CS Constantine
20	MF	Saad Tedjar	14 January 1986 (aged 27)	6	0	(Algerian Football Federation) USM Alger
21	DF	Faouzi Ghoulam	1 February 1991 (aged 21)	0	0	(French Football Federation) Saint-Étienne
22	DF	Ali Rial	26 March 1980 (aged 32)	0	0	(Algerian Football Federation) JS Kabylie
23	GK	Raïs M'Bolhi	25 April 1986 (aged 26)	18	0	(Russian Football Union) Krylia Sovetov

=== Togo ===
Coach: (France) Didier Six

No.	Pos.	Player	Date of birth (age)	Club
1	GK	Mawugbé Atsou	20 August 1986 (aged 26)	(Togolese Football Federation) Maranatha
2	DF	Daré Nibombé	16 June 1980 (aged 32)	(Royal Belgian Football Association) Boussu Dour
3	MF	Dové Womé	8 June 1991 (aged 21)	(South African Football Association) Free State Stars
4	FW	Emmanuel Adebayor (c)	26 February 1984 (aged 28)	(The Football Association) Tottenham Hotspur
5	DF	Serge Akakpo	15 October 1987 (aged 25)	(Slovak Football Association) Žilina
6	DF	Abdoul-Gafar Mamah	24 August 1985 (aged 27)	(Moldovan Football Federation) Dacia Chişinău
7	MF	Moustapha Salifou	1 June 1983 (aged 29)	Unattached
8	FW	Komlan Amewou	15 December 1983 (aged 29)	(French Football Federation) Nîmes
9	DF	Vincent Bossou	7 February 1986 (aged 26)	(Vietnam Football Federation) Becamex Bình Dương
10	MF	Floyd Ayité	12 March 1988 (aged 24)	(French Football Federation) Reims
11	FW	Jonathan Ayité	7 September 1985 (aged 27)	(French Football Federation) Brest
12	MF	Sapol Mani	5 June 1991 (aged 21)	(Algerian Football Federation) CA Batna
13	DF	Sadat Ouro-Akoriko	1 February 1988 (aged 24)	(South African Football Association) Free State Stars
14	MF	Prince Segbefia	11 March 1991 (aged 21)	(French Football Federation) Auxerre
15	MF	Alaixys Romao	18 January 1984 (aged 29)	(French Football Federation) Lorient
16	GK	Kossi Agassa	2 July 1978 (aged 34)	(French Football Federation) Reims
17	FW	Serge Gakpé	7 May 1987 (aged 25)	(French Football Federation) Nantes
18	FW	Mèmè Placca Fessou	1 December 1994 (aged 18)	(Togolese Football Federation) OC Agaza
19	DF	Kodjo Amétépé	3 October 1990 (aged 22)	(Togolese Football Federation) Maranatha
20	MF	Donou Kokou	24 April 1991 (aged 21)	(Togolese Football Federation) Maranatha
21	DF	Dakonam Djene	31 December 1991 (aged 21)	(Cameroonian Football Federation) Coton Sport
22	FW	Kalen Damessi	28 March 1990 (aged 22)	(French Football Federation) Lille
23	GK	Baba Tchagouni	31 December 1990 (aged 22)	(French Football Federation) Dijon

== Player representation ==
=== By club ===
Clubs with 3 or more players represented are listed.

Players	Club
10	(Democratic Republic of the Congo) TP Mazembe
8	(Ethiopia) Dedebit
7	(Ethiopia) Saint George, (South Africa) Kaizer Chiefs, (Tunisia) ES Tunis
6	(France) Evian
5	(Angola) 1º de Agosto, (France) Ajaccio, (France) Brest, (South Africa) Orlando Pirates
4	(Angola) Petro Atlético, (Cyprus) AEL Limassol, (South Africa) Free State Stars
3	(England) Manchester City, (France) Dijon, (France) Lille, (France) Rennes, (France) Saint-Étienne, (Niger) AS GNN, (Nigeria) Enugu Rangers, (Portugal) Olhanense, (Portugal) Vitória de Guimarães, (Togo) Maranatha, (Tunisia) Club Africain, (Tunisia) ÉS Sahel, (Turkey) Galatasaray

=== By club nationality ===
Players	CAF clubs
25	South Africa
20	Ethiopia
19	Tunisia
15	Angola, (Democratic Republic of the Congo) DR Congo
10	Algeria, Morocco
9	Niger
6	Ghana, Nigeria
4	Togo
3	Egypt, Mali, Zambia
2	Cameroon, Cape Verde
1	Gabon, Ivory Coast, Sudan

Players	Clubs outside CAF
57	France
20	England
18	Portugal
12	(Spain) , Turkey
11	Belgium
9	Italy
7	Netherlands
6	Cyprus
5	Israel, Russia
4	(China) , (Germany) , Qatar, Sweden
3	Kuwait, Moldova, United Arab Emirates
2	Greece, Norway, Romania, Saudi Arabia, Ukraine
1	Austria, Brazil, Bulgaria, Denmark, (Japan) , Liechtenstein, Luxembourg, Poland, Scotland, Slovakia, Switzerland, United States, Vietnam

=== By club federation ===
Players	Federation
190	UEFA
155	CAF
18	AFC
1	CONCACAF, CONMEBOL

=== By representatives of domestic league ===
National squad	Players
Ethiopia	20
South Africa	16
Angola	14
Tunisia	12
DR Congo	10
Niger	9
Algeria	8
Morocco	8
Nigeria	6
Ghana	4
Togo	4
Mali	3
Zambia	3
Cape Verde	2
Ivory Coast	1
Burkina Faso	0
