= 2013 Africa Cup of Nations Group C =

Football tournament group stage

Group C of the 2013 Africa Cup of Nations ran from 21 January until 29 January. It consisted of Zambia (holders), Nigeria, Burkina Faso and Ethiopia. The matches were held in the South African cities of Nelspruit and Rustenburg.

== Standings ==
Pos	Team	Pld	W	D	L	GF	GA	GD	Pts	Qualification
1	Burkina Faso	3	1	2	0	5	1	+4	5	Advance to knockout stage
2	Nigeria	3	1	2	0	4	2	+2	5	Advance to knockout stage
3	Zambia	3	0	3	0	2	2	0	3	
4	Ethiopia	3	0	1	2	1	7	−6	1	

Source: CAF

All times South African Standard Time (UTC+2)

== Zambia vs. Ethiopia ==
21 January 2013
17:00
Round 1

Zambia	1–1	Ethiopia
Mbesuma 45+3'	Report	Adane 65'

Mbombela Stadium, Nelspruit
Attendance: 10,000
Referee: Eric Otogo-Castane (Gabon)

Zambia	Ethiopia

GK	16	Kennedy Mweene
RB	6	Davies Nkausu
CB	13	Stoppila Sunzu	(yellow card) 11'
CB	5	Hijani Himoonde
LB	4	Joseph Musonda	(yellow card) 45+1'	(substituted off) 60'
RM	3	Chisamba Lungu	(yellow card) 24'
CM	19	Nathan Sinkala
CM	8	Isaac Chansa		(substituted off) 76'
LM	17	Rainford Kalaba
CF	11	Christopher Katongo (c)		(substituted off) 85'
CF	9	Collins Mbesuma	(yellow card) 69'
Substitutions:
FW	7	Jacob Mulenga		(substituted on) 60'
MF	23	Mukuka Mulenga		(substituted on) 76'
FW	20	Emmanuel Mayuka		(substituted on) 85'
Manager:
(France) Hervé Renard

GK	22	Jemal Tassew	(red card) 35'
RB	17	Siyoum Tesfaye
CB	5	Aynalem Hailu	(yellow card) 39'
CB	12	Biadigling Eliase
LB	4	Abebaw Butako	(yellow card) 90+4'
CM	19	Adane Girma (c)
CM	8	Asrat Megersa
RW	18	Shimelis Bekele		(substituted off) 39'
LW	14	Minyahil Teshome	(yellow card) 90+3'	(substituted off) 90+4'
CF	9	Getaneh Kebede		(substituted off) 64'
CF	7	Saladin Said
Substitutions:
GK	23	Zerihun Tadele		(substituted on) 39'
MF	21	Addis Hintsa		(substituted on) 64'
MF	13	Fuad Ibrahim		(substituted on) 90+4'
Manager:
Sewnet Bishaw

Man of the Match:
Saladin Said (Ethiopia)

Assistant referees:
Jean-Claude Birumushahu (Burundi)
Arsenio Marengula (Mozambique)
Fourth official:
Rajindraparsad Seechurn (Mauritius)

== Nigeria vs. Burkina Faso ==
21 January 2013
20:00

Nigeria	1–1	Burkina Faso
Emenike 23'	Report	Al. Traoré 90+4'

Mbombela Stadium, Nelspruit
Attendance: 8,500
Referee: Mohamed Benouza (Algeria)

Nigeria	Burkina Faso

GK	1	Vincent Enyeama
RB	5	Efe Ambrose	(yellow card) 38' (yellow-red card) 74'
CB	14	Godfrey Oboabona
CB	2	Joseph Yobo (c)
LB	3	Uwa Elderson Echiéjilé
DM	10	Mikel John Obi
CM	13	Fegor Ogude	(yellow card) 24'	(substituted off) 70'
CM	20	Nosa Igiebor	(yellow card) 73'
RW	7	Ahmed Musa
LW	9	Emmanuel Emenike		(substituted off) 58'
CF	8	Brown Ideye		(substituted off) 78'
Substitutions:
FW	15	Ikechukwu Uche		(substituted on) 58'
MF	17	Ogenyi Onazi		(substituted on) 70'
DF	22	Kenneth Omeruo		(substituted on) 78'
Manager:
Stephen Keshi

GK	16	Abdoulaye Soulama
RB	8	Paul Koulibaly
CB	12	Saïdou Panandétiguiri
CB	4	Bakary Koné
LB	5	Mohamed Koffi
DM	7	Florent Rouamba	(substituted off) 82'
CM	6	Djakaridja Koné
CM	11	Jonathan Pitroipa
RW	9	Moumouni Dagano (c)
LW	15	Aristide Bancé	(substituted off) 65'
CF	2	Hugues-Wilfried Dah	(substituted off) 46'
Substitutions:
FW	20	Wilfried Sanou	(substituted on) 46'
MF	10	Alain Traoré	(substituted on) 65'
FW	21	Abdou Razack Traoré	(substituted on) 82'
Manager:
(Belgium) Paul Put

Man of the Match:
Mikel John Obi (Nigeria)

Assistant referees:
Redouane Achik (Morocco)
Jerson Dos Santos (Angola)
Fourth official:
Hamada Nampiandraza (Madagascar)

== Zambia vs. Nigeria ==
25 January 2013
17:00

Zambia	1–1	Nigeria
Mweene 85' (pen.)	Report	Emenike 57'

Mbombela Stadium, Nelspruit
Attendance: 25,000
Referee: Gehad Grisha (Egypt)

Zambia	Nigeria

GK	16	Kennedy Mweene
RB	4	Joseph Musonda
CB	6	Davies Nkausu
CB	13	Stoppila Sunzu
LB	18	Emmanuel Mbola	(yellow card) 73'
RM	3	Chisamba Lungu		(substituted off) 66'
CM	8	Isaac Chansa		(substituted off) 73'
CM	19	Nathan Sinkala	(yellow card) 64'
LM	17	Rainford Kalaba
CF	11	Christopher Katongo (c)		(substituted off) 66'
CF	20	Emmanuel Mayuka
Substitutions:
FW	9	Collins Mbesuma		(substituted on) 66'
MF	23	Mukuka Mulenga		(substituted on) 66'
MF	21	Jonas Sakuwaha		(substituted on) 73'
Manager:
(France) Hervé Renard

GK	1	Vincent Enyeama (c)
RB	17	Ogenyi Onazi
CB	22	Kenneth Omeruo
CB	14	Godfrey Oboabona	(yellow card) 35'
LB	3	Uwa Elderson Echiéjilé	(yellow card) 90+3'
DM	20	Nosa Igiebor		(substituted off) 76'
CM	13	Fegor Ogude
CM	10	Mikel John Obi
RW	11	Victor Moses		(substituted off) 79'
LW	7	Ahmed Musa	(yellow card) 69'	(substituted off) 89'
CF	9	Emmanuel Emenike	(yellow card) 87'
Substitutions:
MF	4	Nwankwo Obiorah		(substituted on) 76'
FW	8	Brown Ideye		(substituted on) 79'
FW	15	Ikechukwu Uche		(substituted on) 89'
Manager:
Stephen Keshi

Man of the Match:
Kennedy Mweene (Zambia)

Assistant referees:
Evarist Menkouande (Cameroon)
Anouar Hmila (Tunisia)
Fourth official:
Djamel Haimoudi (Algeria)

== Burkina Faso vs. Ethiopia ==
25 January 2013
20:00

Burkina Faso	4–0	Ethiopia
Al. Traoré 34', 74'; D. Koné 79'; Pitroipa 90+5'	Report

Mbombela Stadium, Nelspruit
Attendance: 35,000
Referee: Bernard Camille (Seychelles)

Burkina Faso	Ethiopia

GK	16	Abdoulaye Soulama	(red card) 60'
RB	5	Mohamed Koffi
CB	4	Bakary Koné
CB	8	Paul Koulibaly
LB	12	Saïdou Panandétiguiri
DM	18	Charles Kaboré (c)		(substituted off) 90+4'
CM	6	Djakaridja Koné
CM	10	Alain Traoré
RW	20	Wilfried Sanou		(substituted off) 63'
LW	11	Jonathan Pitroipa	(yellow card) 54'
CF	15	Aristide Bancé		(substituted off) 64'
Substitutions:
GK	1	Daouda Diakité		(substituted on) 63'
MF	7	Florent Rouamba		(substituted on) 64'
DF	14	Benjamin Balima		(substituted on) 90+4'
Manager:
(Belgium) Paul Put

GK	23	Zerihun Tadele
RB	17	Siyoum Tesfaye	(yellow card) 72'
CB	5	Aynalem Hailu
CB	2	Degu Debebe (c)
LB	10	Birhanu Bogale
RM	18	Shimelis Bekele		(substituted off) 55'
CM	8	Asrat Megersa		(substituted off) 43'
CM	21	Addis Hintsa
LM	14	Minyahil Teshome
SS	19	Adane Girma		(substituted off) 11'
CF	7	Saladin Said
Substitutions:
MF	20	Behailu Assefa		(substituted on) 11'
MF	3	Yared Zinabu		(substituted on) 43'
FW	9	Getaneh Kebede		(substituted on) 55'
Manager:
Sewnet Bishaw

Man of the Match:
Jonathan Pitroipa (Burkina Faso)

Assistant referees:
Peter Edibe (Nigeria)
Zakhele Siwela (South Africa)
Fourth official:
Bakary Gassama (Gambia)

== Burkina Faso vs. Zambia ==
29 January 2013
19:00

Burkina Faso	0–0	Zambia
	Report

Mbombela Stadium, Nelspruit
Attendance: 8,000
Referee: Sidi Alioum (Cameroon)

Burkina Faso	Zambia

GK	1	Daouda Diakité
RB	5	Mohamed Koffi
CB	4	Bakary Koné
CB	8	Paul Koulibaly
LB	12	Saïdou Panandétiguiri	(yellow card) 67'
DM	7	Florent Rouamba
CM	6	Djakaridja Koné
CM	18	Charles Kaboré (c)
RW	14	Benjamin Balima		(substituted off) 46'
LW	10	Alain Traoré		(substituted off) 11'
CF	11	Jonathan Pitroipa		(substituted off) 90+2'
Substitutions:
FW	15	Aristide Bancé		(substituted on) 11'
FW	2	Hugues-Wilfried Dah		(substituted on) 46'
MF	21	Abdou Razack Traoré		(substituted on) 90+2'
Manager:
(Belgium) Paul Put

GK	16	Kennedy Mweene (c)
RB	6	Davies Nkausu		(substituted off) 15'
CB	13	Stoppila Sunzu
CB	5	Hijani Himoonde
LB	18	Emmanuel Mbola
RM	17	Rainford Kalaba
CM	19	Nathan Sinkala
CM	8	Isaac Chansa		(substituted off) 55'
LM	3	Chisamba Lungu		(substituted off) 80'
CF	20	Emmanuel Mayuka	(yellow card) 37'
CF	9	Collins Mbesuma
Substitutions:
DF	4	Joseph Musonda	(yellow card) 31'	(substituted on) 15'
MF	23	Mukaka Mulenga		(substituted on) 55'
MF	21	Jonas Sakuwaha		(substituted on) 80'
Manager:
(France) Hervé Renard

Man of the Match:
Djakaridja Koné (Burkina Faso)

Assistant referees:
Evarist Menkouande (Cameroon)
Yanoussa Moussa (Cameroon)
Fourth official:
Koman Coulibaly (Mali)

== Ethiopia vs. Nigeria ==
29 January 2013
19:00

Ethiopia	0–2	Nigeria
	Report	Moses 80' (pen.), 90' (pen.)

Royal Bafokeng Stadium, Rustenburg
Attendance: 15,000
Referee: Bouchaïb El Ahrach (Morocco)

Ethiopia	Nigeria

GK	1	Sisay Bancha	(yellow card) 82' (yellow-red card) 85'
RB	6	Alula Girma	(yellow card) 78'
CB	2	Degu Debebe (c)	(yellow card) 42'
CB	12	Biadigling Elias	(yellow card) 21'
LB	4	Abebaw Butako
RM	9	Getaneh Kebede
CM	21	Addis Hintsa
CM	15	Dawit Estifanos		(substituted off) 46'
LM	16	Yussuf Saleh		(substituted off) 68'
SS	11	Oumed Oukri		(substituted off) 46'
CF	7	Saladin Said
Substitutions:
MF	13	Fuad Ibrahim		(substituted on) 46'
MF	14	Minyahil Teshome		(substituted on) 46'
DF	10	Birhanu Bogale		(substituted on) 68'
Manager:
Sewnet Bishaw

GK	1	Vincent Enyeama (c)
RB	5	Efe Ambrose
CB	22	Kenneth Omeruo
CB	14	Godfrey Oboabona
LB	3	Uwa Elderson Echiéjilé
DM	10	Mikel John Obi		(substituted off) 90+2'
CM	19	Sunday Mba	(yellow card) 62'
CM	13	Fegor Ogude	(yellow card) 63'
RW	9	Emmanuel Emenike		(substituted off) 75'
LW	11	Victor Moses
CF	15	Ikechukwu Uche		(substituted off) 65'
Substitutions:
FW	7	Ahmed Musa		(substituted on) 65'
FW	8	Brown Ideye		(substituted on) 75'
DF	2	Joseph Yobo		(substituted on) 90+2'
Manager:
Stephen Keshi

Man of the Match:
Vincent Enyeama (Nigeria)

Assistant referees:
Félicien Kabanda (Rwanda)
Anouar Hmila (Tunisia)
Fourth official:
Noumandiez Doué (Ivory Coast)
