= 2013 Africa Cup of Nations final =

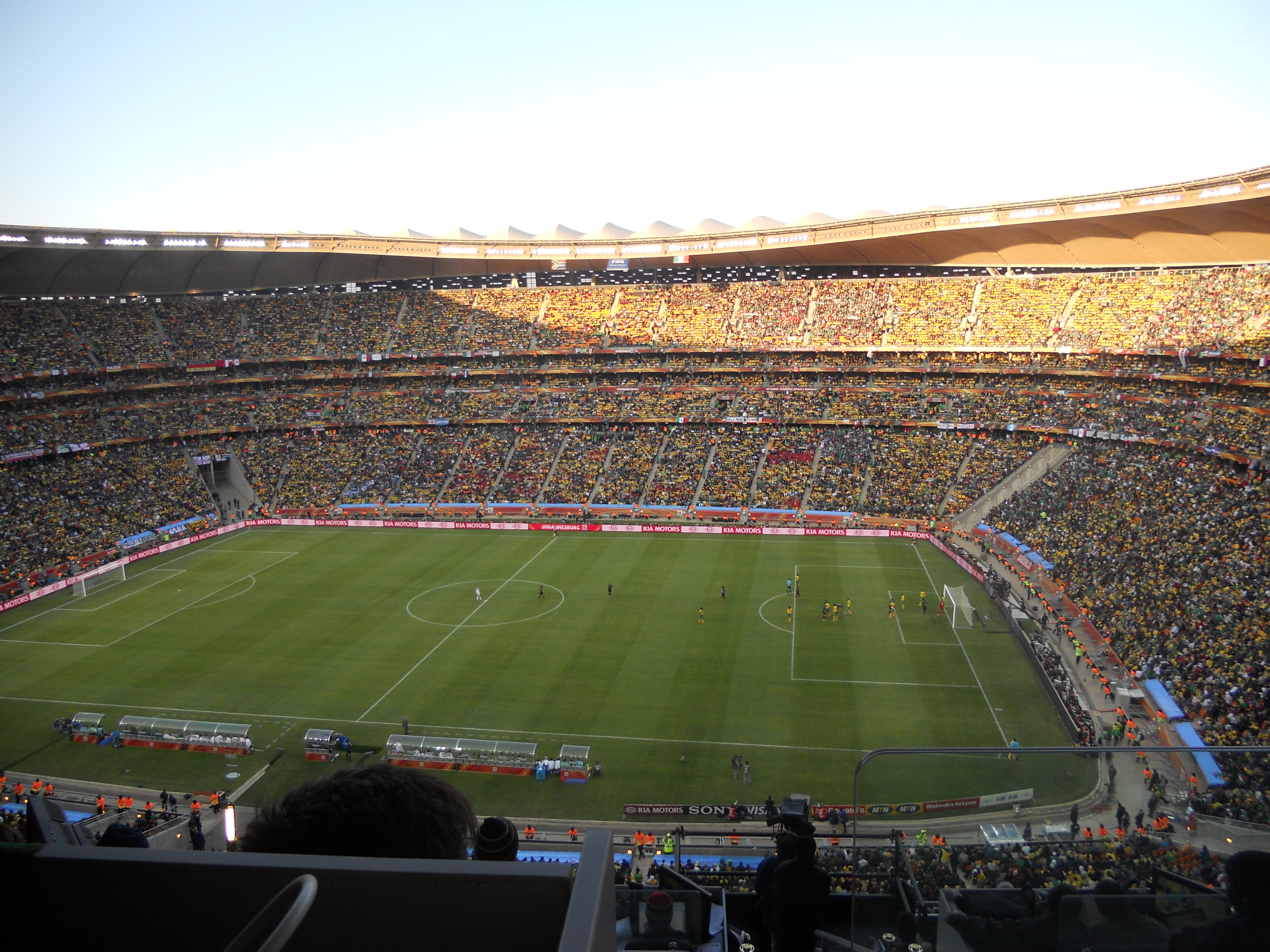
- FNB Stadium in Johannesburg hosted the final
- Event: 2013 Africa Cup of Nations
Nigeria	Burkina Faso
1	0
- Date: 10 February 2013
- Venue: FNB Stadium, Johannesburg
- Man of the Match: Mikel John Obi (Nigeria)
- Fair Player of the Match: Bakary Koné (Burkina Faso)
- Referee: Djamel Haimoudi (Algeria)
- Attendance: 85,000

The 2013 Africa Cup of Nations final was a football match that took place on 10 February 2013 to determine the winner of the 2013 Africa Cup of Nations, the football championship of Africa organized by the Confederation of African Football (CAF). The match was held at the FNB Stadium in Johannesburg which also hosted the 1996 Africa Cup of Nations Final and the 2010 FIFA World Cup Final. The tournament's closing ceremony was held just prior to kick-off. The decision was announced in May 2012. The final was contested between Nigeria and Burkina Faso.

Sunday Mba scored the only goal as Nigeria won the final 1–0. Hence, Nigeria then represented CAF at the 2013 FIFA Confederations Cup.

== Background ==
Nigeria won the Africa Cup of Nations in 1980 and 1994, and were losing finalists in 1984, 1988, 1990 and 2000. Despite this, Nigeria were not favorites coming into the tournament due to a decline in its fortunes, as a result of which Nigeria did not even qualify for the tournament in 2012. New coach Stephen Keshi had brought young, home-based players such as Sunday Mba and Godfrey Oboabona, and foreign-based players like Victor Moses, Vincent Enyeama, Emmanuel Emenike, Brown Ideye, Mikel John Obi and Uwa Elderson Echiéjilé who were crucial to Nigeria's run in the tournament. Their first match was a 1–1 draw to Burkina Faso, where Nigeria scored through Emenike but Burkina Faso's Alain Traoré cancelled out the lead with moments to go. They then drew with defending champions Zambia 1–1, as another late goal from a Penalty kick by Zambian goalkeeper Kennedy Mweene cancelled out Emenike's second goal of the tournament. In their last group game against Ethiopia, they were going out to Zambia for a worse booking record, but thanks to Chelsea F.C. midfielder Moses, the Nigerians won 2–0 and advanced at the expense of the defending champions. In the quarters, they defeated pre-tournament favorites Ivory Coast 2–1 in a shocking upset where Emenike and Mba scored goals. Keshi's gamble of including six home-based players in the squad paid further dividends as Nigeria crushed Mali 4–1 in the semis (goalscorers Echiejele, Ideye, Musa and Emenike) If the disputed goal is included, Emenike will be the tournament's joint top scorer with four goals along with Ghana's Mubarak Wakaso coming into the final.

On the other hand, Burkina Faso had reached the semi-finals of the tournament once when they hosted in 1998, but they had never won an away match in AFCON and had a winless streak of 26 matches. In addition to that, in 2012, they exited at the group stage of the AFCON without a win, and were almost eliminated by the Central African Republic in qualifying, before Alain Traore saved them from elimination. Traore also saved them from a defeat against Nigeria in the opening Group match. The turnaround came with a 4–0 thrashing of Ethiopia, where Traore, Jonathan Pitroipa and Djakaridja Kone all scored, before drawing with Zambia 0–0 to send the reigning champions home for the first time since 1992. In a difficult pitch in Nelspruit, Pitroipa's extra time goal brought a 1–0 victory over Togo in the quarterfinals. In a stadium which had virtually become Burkina's home ground after playing four matches there, they defeated Ghana in the semis through penalties after Aristide Bance and Ghana's Mubarak Wakaso both scored in a 1–1 draw, and underdogs Burkina Faso under Belgian coach Paul Put had qualified to their maiden final.

As statistics stood after the semifinals, Emenike was Nigeria's top scorer with 4 goals and Traore was Burkina Faso's top scorer with 3 goals, but he had been ruled out of the tournament after the group stages due to thigh injury.

On 8 February 2013, after receiving a protest made by the Football Association of Burkina Faso, the Africa Cup of Nations Organizing Committee ruled to overturn the second yellow card received by Burkina Faso forward Jonathan Pitroipa in the semifinal, meaning he was eligible to play in the final.

== Route to the final ==
Nigeria
Round
Burkina Faso
Opponent
Result
Group stage
Opponent
Result
Burkina Faso
1–1
Match 1
Nigeria
1–1
Zambia
1–1
Match 2
Ethiopia
4–0
Ethiopia
2–0
Match 3
Zambia
0–0

Team	Pld	W	D	L	GF	GA	GD	Pts
Burkina Faso	3	1	2	0	5	1	+4	5
Nigeria	3	1	2	0	4	2	+2	5
Zambia	3	0	3	0	2	2	0	3
Ethiopia	3	0	1	2	1	7	−6	1

Final standings

Team	Pld	W	D	L	GF	GA	GD	Pts
Burkina Faso	3	1	2	0	5	1	+4	5
Nigeria	3	1	2	0	4	2	+2	5
Zambia	3	0	3	0	2	2	0	3
Ethiopia	3	0	1	2	1	7	−6	1

Opponent
Result
Knockout stage
Opponent
Result
Ivory Coast
2–1
Quarterfinals
Togo
1–0 (aet)
Mali
4–1
Semifinals
Ghana
1–1 (aet) (3–2 pen.)

== Match ==
=== Summary ===
Despite the narrow margin of victory, Nigeria's win was considered a comfortable one, and the outsiders Burkina Faso were described as looking tired.

Early play in the match was characterised by bursts down the wings from Victor Moses, and two close chances for the Super Eagles. The first was a seventh-minute header from Efe Ambrose off a Moses' free kick, and the second a Brown Ideye shot that flew over the crossbar. Burkina Faso showed little threat in the first half, and spent a lot of time in their own territory. Sunday Mba scored the only goal of the game after 40 minutes, when he collected a deflected shot, flicked the ball over Mohamed Koffi with his right foot, then volleyed the goal with his left.

Nigeria had several chances to extend their lead in the second half, but none were converted. In the 77th minute, Wilfried Sanou forced a fingertip save from Nigerian goalkeeper Vincent Enyeama to prevent an equaliser.

=== Details ===
10 February 2013
20:30 SAST

Nigeria	1–0	Burkina Faso
Mba 40'	Report

FNB Stadium, Johannesburg
Attendance: 85,000
Referee: Djamel Haimoudi (Algeria)

Nigeria	Burkina Faso

GK	1	Vincent Enyeama (c)
RB	5	Efe Ambrose
CB	22	Kenneth Omeruo	(yellow card) 57'
CB	14	Godfrey Oboabona
LB	3	Uwa Elderson Echiéjilé		(substituted off) 66'
CM	17	Ogenyi Onazi	(yellow card) 38'
CM	10	Mikel John Obi	(yellow card) 57'
RW	11	Victor Moses
AM	19	Sunday Mba		(substituted off) 89'
LW	8	Brown Ideye	(yellow card) 90+2'
CF	15	Ikechukwu Uche		(substituted off) 54'
Substitutions:
FW	7	Ahmed Musa		(substituted on) 54'
DF	21	Juwon Oshaniwa	(yellow card) 71'	(substituted on) 66'
DF	2	Joseph Yobo		(substituted on) 89'
Manager:
(Nigeria) Stephen Keshi

GK	1	Daouda Diakité
RB	5	Mohamed Koffi
CB	4	Bakary Koné
CB	8	Paul Koulibaly		(substituted off) 84'
LB	12	Saïdou Panandétiguiri
CM	6	Djakaridja Koné		(substituted off) 90'
CM	7	Florent Rouamba	(yellow card) 33'	(substituted off) 65'
RW	22	Prejuce Nakoulma
AM	18	Charles Kaboré (c)
LW	11	Jonathan Pitroipa
CF	15	Aristide Bancé
Substitutions:
FW	20	Wilfried Sanou		(substituted on) 65'
FW	9	Moumouni Dagano		(substituted on) 84'
MF	21	Abdou Razack Traoré		(substituted on) 90'
Manager:
(Belgium) Paul Put

Man of the Match:
Mikel John Obi (Nigeria)

Fair Player of the Match:
Bakary Koné (Burkina Faso)

Assistant referees:
Redouane Achik (Morocco)
Jean-Claude Birumushahu (Burundi)
Fourth official:
Rajindraparsad Seechurn (Mauritius)

== Post-match ==
Burkina Faso head coach Paul Put conceded that his team "showed Nigeria a bit too much respect in the first half", but contended that "The whole of Burkina Faso can be proud of their players."

Nigeria head coach Stephen Keshi declared "Winning this is mainly for my nation". Looking forward to the 2013 FIFA Confederations Cup he said "To represent Africa in Brazil at the Confed Cup is an honour for Nigeria." This victory made Keshi the second man, after Mahmoud El-Gohary, to win the Cup of Nations as both player and coach.
