= Addis Hintsa =

Ethiopian footballer

Personal information
- Full name: Addis Hintsa Tekle
- Date of birth: 30 June 1987 (age 39)
- Place of birth: Bishoftu, Oromia, Ethiopia
- Height: 1.83 m (6 ft 0 in)
- Position: Centre midfielder

Team information
- Current team: Al-Ahly Shendi
- Number: 23

Senior career*
| Years | Team | Apps | (Gls) |
| 2008–2011 | Banks SC | | |
| 2011–2013 | Dedebit | | |
| 2013– | Al-Ahly Shendi | | |
| | Hadiya Hossana FC | 3 | (0) |

International career^{‡}
| 2012– | Ethiopia | 16 | (1) |
- * Club domestic league appearances and goals as of 17 October 2012 ‡ National team caps and goals as of 17 November 2013

Addis Hintsa (Amharic: አዲስ ህንጻ, born 30 July 1987 in Bishoftu) Oromia state is an Ethiopian footballer. He currently plays for Sudan Premier League side Al-Ahly Shendi.

== Career ==
2012 had been a golden year for the Dedebit midfielder. He played in the midfield for most of the matches in EPL. Addis is relatively a complete central midfielder, can tackle, defend, and is good in the air. He was awarded Player of the season award in 2011/12 by Passion Sport magazine award. As of 2021, Addis plays for Hadiya Hossana FC.

== International career ==
He had his first international cap for the Ethiopian national football team in 2012. He was a key player in the 2013 Africa Cup of Nations. On the final match in 2013 Africa Cup of Nations Group C against Nigeria, the team's goalie Sisay Bancha was sent off and he stepped up to take the goalkeeper's role as all of their substitutions were already used. However, he couldn't save Victor Moses's penalty kick as they lost 0–2 to Nigeria by Moses' penalty kicks.
