= Arba Minch City FC =

Association football club in Ethiopia

Arba Minch City
- Full name: Arba Minch City Football Club
- Nickname: The Crocodiles
- Short name: Arba Minch Kenema
- Founded: 1971
- Ground: Arba Minch Stadium
- Capacity: 5,000
- Chairman: Tadion Chemesa
- Manager: Mesay Teferi
- League: Ethiopian Premier League
- 2025–26: Ethiopian Premier League, 20th
Home colours	Away colours	Third colours

Arba Minch City Football Club (Amharic: አርባምንጭ ከተማ), also known as Arba Minch Kenema, is a professional Ethiopian football club based in Arba Minch, South Ethiopia Regional State. They play in the Ethiopian Premier League, the first division of professional football in Ethiopia.

== History ==
Arba Minch was most recently promoted to the Premier League in 2011–12 season. After a relative smooth first three seasons in the top league, frequent changes in coaches and administrative problems led them to be struggles over the next 4 seasons. Arba Minch narrowly avoided relegation in both the 2015–16 and 2016–17 seasons.

Arba Minch signed manager Tsegaye K/Mariam to a two-year contract before the 2017–18 campaign. Only to later sack the manager just a couple months into his contract. After seven straight seasons in the top league Arba Minch was relegated from the Ethiopian Premier League after the 2017–18 season. They rejoined the top division for the 2021–22 season.

== Players ==
=== First-team squad ===
Note: Flags indicate national team as defined under FIFA eligibility rules; some limited exceptions apply. Players may hold more than one non-FIFA nationality.

No.	Pos.	Nation	Player
1	GK	ETH	Abel Mamo
-	GK	ETH	Said Habtamu
-	GK	ETH	Yesaq Tegegne
5	DF	KEN	Bernard Ochieng
-	DF	ETH	Bereket Wolde-Yohannes
-	FW	ETH	Fekadu Mekonin
26	FW	KEN	Erick Kapaito
-	FW	ETH	Sintayehu Mengistu

== Former managers ==
- (Ethiopia) Tsegay K/Mariam
- (Ethiopia) Alemayehu Abayeneh
- (Ethiopia) Paulos Tsegaye
- (Ethiopia) Eyob Maale
- (Ethiopia) Dawit Cairo (from Gamo Chencha FC)
- (Ethiopia) John habtualem (from Chencha FC)

== Former players ==
- (Ethiopia) Degu Debebe
- (Ethiopia) Mulalem Mesfin
- (Ethiopia) Abebaw Butako
- (Ethiopia) Bereket
- (Ethiopia) Endale Kebede
- (Ethiopia) Mulualem Tilahun
- (Ethiopia) Temesgen Duba
