= Bernard Ochieng =

Kenyan footballer (born 1996)

Personal information
- Full name: Bernard Ochieng Oginga
- Date of birth: 25 January 1996 (age 30)
- Place of birth: Ahero, Kenya
- Position: Defender

Team information
- Current team: Arba Minch City F.C.
- Number: 15

Senior career*
Years	Team	Apps	(Gls)
2016–21	Vihiga United	55	(0)
2021–23	Arba Minch City F.C.	46	(0)
2023–24	Ethiopian Insurance	19	(1)
2024–	Arba Minch City F.C.	12	(0)

International career
2018–2019	Kenya	5	(0)
- * Club domestic league appearances and goals as of 28 June 2025

Bernard Ochieng (born 25 January 1996) is a Kenyan professional footballer who plays as a defender for Vihiga United.
