= Juwon Oshaniwa =

Nigerian footballer

Personal information
- Date of birth: 14 September 1990 (age 36)
- Place of birth: Ilorin, Nigeria
- Position: Left-back

Senior career*
Years	Team	Apps	(Gls)
2007–2008	Kwara United		
2008–2009	Lobi Stars		
2009–2012	Sharks		
2012–2015	Ashdod	47	(1)
2015–2017	Heart of Midlothian	24	(0)
2018–2019	Akwa United		

International career
2012–2014	Nigeria	17	(0)
Medal record
Men's football
Representing Nigeria
Africa Cup of Nations
Winner	2013 South Africa
- * Club domestic league appearances and goals

Juwon Oshaniwa MON (born 14 September 1990) is a Nigerian former professional footballer who played as a left-back.

He previously played for Kwara United, Lobi Stars, Sharks and Akwa United in Nigeria, Ashdod in Israel and Heart of Midlothian in Scotland. Oshaniwa is a full international for Nigeria and played in the 2014 FIFA World Cup.

== Club career ==
=== Ashdod ===
Oshaniwa played club football in Nigeria for Kwara United, Lobi Stars and Sharks. After five years at Nigeria, Oshaniwa announced his intention to play in Europe.

In September 2012, he signed a four-year deal with Israeli club F.C. Ashdod. Oshaniwa made his Ashdod debut on 13 September 2012, where he made his first start, in a 2–1 win over Beitar Jerusalem. Just four months after signing for the club, Oshaniwa was linked with a move to Scottish Premiership side Celtic. Unfortunately, Oshaniwa suffered a virus that kept him out for months and made his return to the first team on 3 March 2013, in a 1–1 draw against Hapoel Tel Aviv. In his first season at Ashdod, Oshawniwa made sixteen appearances for the club.

His second season at Ashdod saw him continued to be in the first team regular, as he made twenty-four appearances. His playing time was restricted to six games after injuries However, the club were later relegated from the Israeli top flight after finishing last of the Bottom Playoff. In January 2015, he was linked with a transfer to Scottish side Celtic for the second time. But the move had never materialised. The 2014–15 season saw Oshaniwa had his playing time restricted following his first team opportunities being limited with eleven appearances. During the season, Oshaniwa scored his first Ashdod goal on 17 January 2015, in a 2–1 win over Hapoel Petah Tikva.

Following the 2014–15 season, it was announced that Oshaniwa left the club to make his move to Scotland.

=== Heart of Midlothian ===
In June, Oshaniwa was linked with a move to Scottish club Heart of Midlothian ("Hearts") and stated he keen to move to United Kingdom to continue his football development. Weeks later, Hearts made a move for Oshaniwa and was on verge of signing him. However, the negotiations to complete the move was delayed over visa requirement, which he eventually was granted on 28 July 2015. His move to Hearts was completed, subject to international clearance, on 1 August. Oshaniwa expressed delight to join the club.

Following the move, Oshaniwa was not playing in the opening game of the season against St Johnstone and was at the dugout watching, as he was amazed with the football, the entertainment and the fans. Oshaniwa made his Hearts debut on 8 August 2015, playing as a left-back, in a 2–1 win against Dundee. In the 2016–17 season, Oshaniwa did not make any first-team appearances. He was released by Hearts in June 2017, a year before his contract had been due to expire.

In 2018 he signed for Akwa United.

== International career ==
Oshawniwa was called up by Nigeria on 30 March 2012 and made his international debut for Nigeria in 2012, Since being called up by the national team, Oshawina has appeared in FIFA World Cup qualifying matches.

He was called up to Nigeria's 23-man squad for the 2013 Africa Cup of Nations. After appearing as an un-used substitute in Nigeria's African Cup of Nations, Oshaniwa played in the final, where he came on as a substitute for Elderson Echiéjilé in the 66th minute, in a 1–0 win over Burkina Faso to win African Cup of Nations for the third time. He said that winning the tournament was the highlight of his career.

The following year, Oshaniwa was named in the provisional squad for the 2014 FIFA World Cup. Oshaniwa continued to be in the squad for the World Cup following the cuts to the 23-man squad, where he played in all four of Nigeria's matches at the World Cup.

== Playing style ==
The Cable has described Oshaniwa's playing style as "strength, tough tackles, good marking in one-on-one situation."

== Honours ==
Orders

- Member of the Order of the Niger
