= Kodjo Amétépé =

Togolese association football player

Personal information
- Date of birth: 18 December 1986 (age 39)
- Place of birth: Adidogome, Lomé, Togo
- Height: 1.88 m (6 ft 2 in)
- Position: Midfielder

Team information
- Current team: Maranatha FC

Senior career*
Years	Team	Apps	(Gls)
2009–2012	Maranatha FC		
2012–2014	CF Mounana		
2015–	Maranatha FC		

International career^{‡}
2011–2012	Togo	3	(0)
- * Club domestic league appearances and goals as of 22:46, 26 April 2021 (UTC) ‡ National team caps and goals as of 22:46, 26 April 2021 (UTC)

Kodjo Amétépé (born 18 December 1986) is a Togolese footballer who plays as a midfielder for Maranatha FC and the Togo national football team.
