= Djakaridja Koné =

Burkinabé former professional footballer (born 1986)

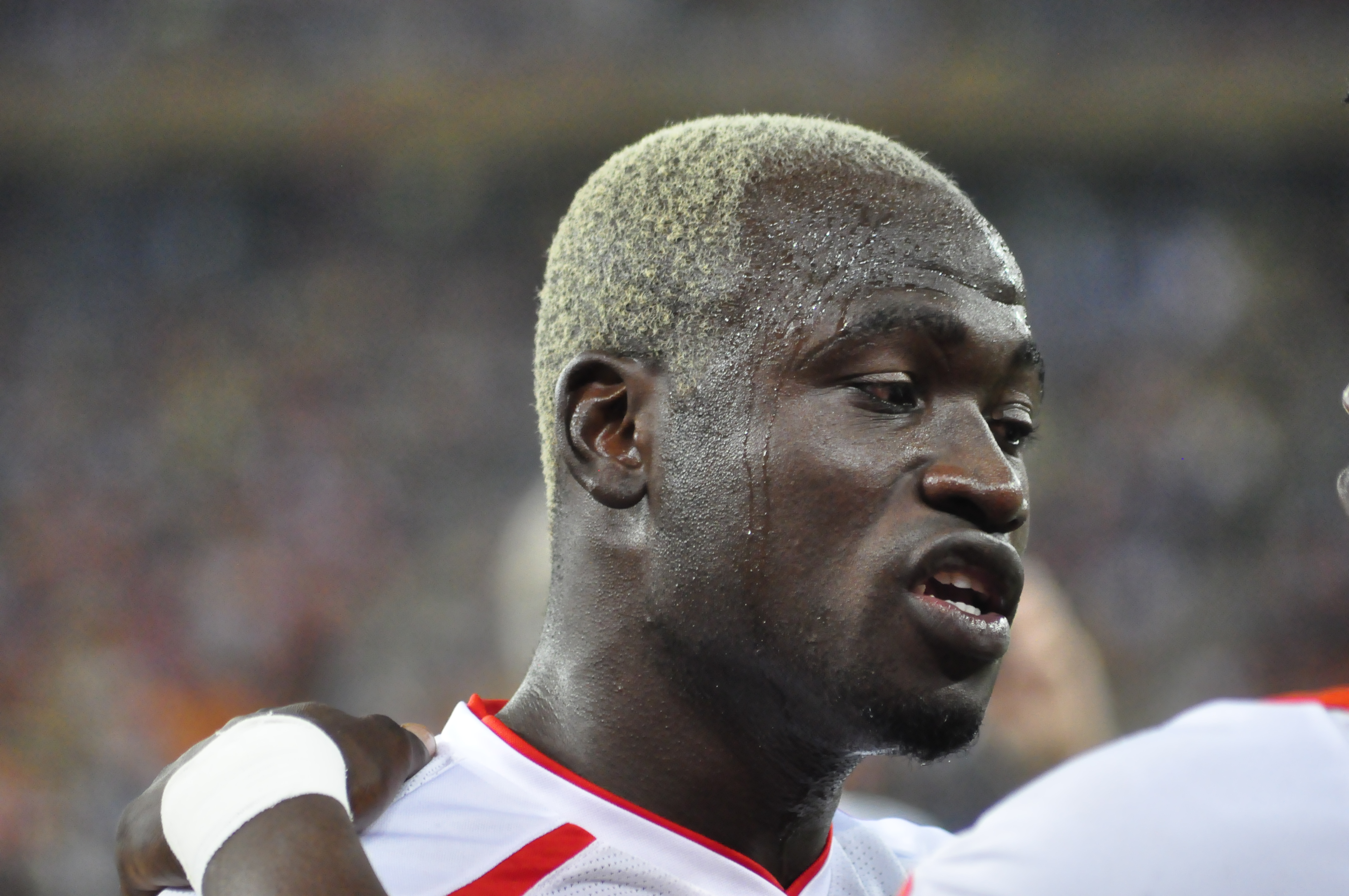
- Djakaridja Koné playing for Burkina Faso in 2013.

Personal information
- Date of birth: 22 July 1986 (age 40)
- Place of birth: Abidjan, Ivory Coast
- Height: 1.83 m (6 ft 0 in)
- Position: Defensive midfielder

Senior career*
Years	Team	Apps	(Gls)
2006–2009	Hapoel Petah Tikva	29	(1)
2006–2008	→ Hapoel Haifa (loan)	62	(2)
2009–2012	Dinamo București	75	(4)
2012–2015	Evian	63	(1)
2015–2016	Sivasspor	18	(1)
Total		247	(9)

International career
- Ivory Coast U17
- Ivory Coast U19
2011–2015	Burkina Faso	41	(2)
Medal record
Representing Burkina Faso
Africa Cup of Nations
Runner-up	2013 South Africa
- * Club domestic league appearances and goals

Djakaridja Koné (born 22 July 1986) is a Burkinabé former professional footballer who played as a defensive midfielder.

== Club career ==
=== Hapoel Petah Tikva and Hapoel Haifa ===
Koné was born on 22 July 1986 in Abidjan, Ivory Coast and began playing football in Israel with Hapoel Petah Tikva, making his senior debut during the 2005–06 Israeli Premier League campaign. In the summer of 2006 he was loaned in the second league to Hapoel Haifa, appearing regularly for the side during his two-year spell. He returned to Hapoel Petah Tikva in first league football, playing constantly in the 2008–09 season.

=== Dinamo București ===
On 18 July 2009, Koné moved to Romania, signing a three-year contract with Dinamo București. He made his Liga I debut on 7 August 2009 when coach Dario Bonetti sent him in the 64th minute to replace Gabriel Boștină in a 0–1 home loss to Internațional Curtea de Argeș. In his first season spent at the club, Koné formed a partnership in the central midfield with Ousmane N'Doye. He helped the club achieve what was dubbed "The wonder from Liberec" by winning the away game 3–0 against Slovan Liberec to force a penalty shoot-out after losing the first leg by the same score, ultimately qualifying for the 2009–10 Europa League group stage. His performance in the match earned him a grade 10 from the Gazeta Sporturilor newspaper. Subsequently, Dinamo reached the 2011 Cupa României final, where Koné played the first 72 minutes before being replaced with Elis Bakaj by coach Ioan Andone in the 2–1 loss to rivals Steaua București.

In his last season spent with The Red Dogs, Koné won the 2011–12 Cupa României, being used by coach Bonetti the entire match in the 1–0 victory in the final against Rapid București, and was named Man of the match. Shortly afterwards he was linked to Olympique de Marseille, but nothing came of it, similar to another rumor that he was going to sign with Bundesliga side, Hannover 96. Koné has a total of 75 appearances with four goals in Liga I, and also represented Dinamo in 13 games with one goal in the Europa League.

=== Evian ===
On 20 July 2012, Koné switched teams and countries once more, after agreeing to a three-year contract with Ligue 1 side Evian. He made his debut in the league on 24 August under coach Pablo Correa, coming on as a late substitute for Cédric Barbosa in a 1–1 home draw against Lyon. Koné scored his only goal in French top-flight on 27 September 2014, netting the first in a 2–0 away win over Lorient. He appeared regularly for The Savoy Crosses during his three-season spell, but in the last one, they were relegated to the second division.

=== Sivasspor ===
In September 2015, Koné signed with Turkish side, Sivasspor. He made his Süper Lig debut under coach Sergen Yalçın on 13 September in a 1–1 draw against Rizespor. In his single season spent at the club, Koné made a total of 18 league appearances with one goal scored in a 2–2 draw against Mersin Talim Yurdu.

== International career ==
After representing Ivory Coast at under-17 and under-19 levels, Koné was subsequently eligible to play for Burkina Faso. He made his debut for the latter's main squad under coach Paulo Duarte on 9 February 2011, in a 0–1 friendly loss to Cape Verde.

Koné played two games during the successful 2012 Africa Cup of Nations qualifiers. Subsequently, he played under coach Duarte in two losses to Angola and Sudan in the final tournament, as his side failed to progress from their group. Coach Paul Put used Koné in all the six games in the 2013 Africa Cup of Nations, as they got past the group stage where he netted the third goal in a 4–0 win against Ethiopia. Then they eliminated Togo in the quarter-finals and Ghana in the semi-finals, losing the final with 0–1 to Nigeria in which he played the entire match.

Koné played six games during the 2014 World Cup qualifiers, scoring a goal in the 3–2 victory in the first leg of the play-off against Algeria which was eventually lost on the away goals rule, as they suffered a 0–1 defeat in the second leg. He made five appearances in the successful 2015 Africa Cup of Nations qualifiers. Afterwards coach Paul Put used him in all three group stage games of the final tournament which consisted of a draw against Equatorial Guinea and losses to Gabon and Congo, as they surprisingly did not advance further. Subsequently, Koné played two games in the 2017 Africa Cup of Nations qualifiers. He made his last appearance for the national team on 12 November 2015 in a 1–2 away loss to Benin during the 2018 World Cup qualifiers, having a total of 41 matches with two goals for The Stallions.

== Career statistics ==
=== International ===
Appearances and goals by national team and year
National team	Year	Apps	Goals
Burkina Faso	2011	6	0
Burkina Faso	2012	5	0
Burkina Faso	2013	14	2
Burkina Faso	2014	6	0
Burkina Faso	2015	10	0
Total		41	2

Scores and results list Burkina Faso's goal tally first, score column indicates score after each Koné goal.

List of international goals scored by Djakaridja Kone'
No.	Date	Venue	Opponent	Score	Result	Competition
1	25 January 2013	Mbombela Stadium, Nelspruit, South Africa	Ethiopia	3–0	4–0	2013 Africa Cup of Nations
2	12 October 2013	Stade du 4-Août, Ouagadougou, Burkina Faso	Algeria	2–1	3–2	2014 FIFA World Cup qualification

== Honours ==
=== Club ===
Dinamo București

- Cupa României: 2011–12, runner-up 2010–11

=== International ===
Burkina Faso

- African Cup of Nations runner-up: 2013
