= Mawugbe Atsu =

Togolese footballer

Mawugbe Atsou
Personal information
- Full name: Mawugbe Atsou
- Date of birth: 20 August 1986 (age 40)
- Place of birth: Womé, Togo
- Height: 1.77 m (5 ft 9 1/2 in)
- Position: Goalkeeper

Team information
- Current team: Maranatha F.C.
- Number: 30

Youth career
- 2002–2006: Maranatha F.C.

Senior career*
| Years | Team | Apps | (Gls) |
| 2006– | Maranatha F.C. | 49 | (0) |

International career
| 2009– | Togo | 1 | (0) |
- * Club domestic league appearances and goals

Mawugbe Atsu (born 20 August 1986) is a Togolese footballer. He currently plays for Maranatha F.C.

== International career ==
Atsu earned his first call up for his country on 6 September 2009 for the World Cup Qualifying Match against Morocco national football team, who gave his debut for Togo.
