= Jemal Tassew =

Ethiopian footballer

Personal information
- Full name: Jemal Tassew Bushra
- Date of birth: 27 April 1989 (age 37)
- Place of birth: Awassa, Ethiopia
- Height: 1.79 m (5 ft 10 in)
- Position: Goalkeeper

Team information
- Current team: Wolkite City
- Number: 1

Senior career*
Years	Team	Apps	(Gls)
2009–2010	Awassa		
2010–2012	Dedebit		
2012–2013	Ethiopian Coffee		
2013–2014	Dedebit		
2014–2016	Defence Force		
2016–2017	Jimma Aba Buna		
2017–2018	Dire Dawa City		
2018–2020	Fasil Kenema		
2020–	Wolkite City	39	(0)
2021-2022	Adama City	16	(0)

International career^{‡}
2010–2022	Ethiopia	35	(0)
- * Club domestic league appearances and goals ‡ National team caps and goals as of 30 March 2021

Jemal Tassew Bushra (Amharic: ጀማል ጣሰው ቡሽራ, born 27 April 1989) is an Ethiopian professional footballer who plays as a goalkeeper for Ethiopian Premier League club Wolkite City.

== Career ==
Jemal began his career with Awassa City. In 2010, he joined Dedebit, and as of season 2012/13 he plays in Ethiopian Coffee. In 2010, he was awarded as Ethiopian Premier League Player of the Year.

In August 2018, Jamal signed with Fasil Kenema.

== International career ==
Jemal was in the squad that played 2010 CECAFA Cup. He debuted for Ethiopia in a match against Kenya, and played 3 games on that tournament. In 2012, he collected 2 more caps, against Sudan, and Niger.

Jemal was sent off in the 35th minute of Ethiopia's opening game of the 2013 Africa Cup of Nations against Zambia.
