= Hatten Baratli =

Tunisian professional footballer

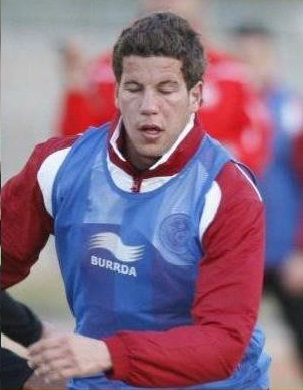

Personal information
- Full name: Hatten Baratli
- Date of birth: 9 January 1991 (age 35)
- Place of birth: Bizerte, Tunisia
- Height: 1.80 m (5 ft 11 in)
- Position: Midfielder

Team information
- Current team: CA Bizertin
- Number: 24

Senior career*
Years	Team	Apps	(Gls)
2009–2012	CA Bizertin	39	(3)
2012–2014	Club Africain	35	(1)
2014–2015	CA Bizertin	8	(0)
2015–2016	Damac		
2016–2017	Ohod		
2017–2018	Al-Shoalah		
2018	Al-Kawkab		
2019–	CA Bizertin	2	(0)

International career
2012–2013	Tunisia	4	(0)
- * Club domestic league appearances and goals as of 20:40, 19 November 2019 (UTC)

Hatten Baratli (born 9 January 1991) is a Tunisian professional footballer who plays as a midfielder for CA Bizertin.
