= Abdoulaye Soulama =

Burkinabé footballer

Personal information
- Full name: Abdoulaye Soulama Traore
- Date of birth: 29 November 1979
- Place of birth: Ouagadougou, Upper Volta
- Date of death: 27 October 2017 (aged 37)
- Position: Goalkeeper

Youth career
- 1994–1997: ASFA Yennega

Senior career*
Years	Team	Apps	(Gls)
1997–2000	ASFA Yennega	-	
2000–2002	Denizlispor	25	(0)
2002–2003	CA Batna	-	
2003–2006	ASF Bobo-Dioulasso	-	
2006–2007	ASFA Yennega	-	
2007–2014	Asante Kotoko	-	(-)
2014–2016	Hearts of Oak SC	-	(-)

International career^{‡}
1997–2015	Burkina Faso	61	(0)
Medal record
Representing Burkina Faso
Africa Cup of Nations
Runner-up	2013 South Africa
- * Club domestic league appearances and goals ‡ National team caps and goals as of 28 June 2012

Abdoulaye Soulama (29 November 1979 – 27 October 2017) was a Burkinabé international footballer.

== Career ==
In the 2001-2002 football season, Soulama played for Turkish team Denizlispor. He played successful matches at the club which made it to the UEFA Cup that season. Unfortunately, some Turkish players, including team captain Tolunay Kafkas, wanted coach Sakip Ozberk to give the starting spot to Turkish substitute Suleyman Kucuk. At a cup match against Fenerbahçe SK, Tolunay punched Soulama in the face and got a red card. However, despite being reduced to 10 men, Denizlispor managed to pull a surprise and defeat their opponent 2–1. At the end of the season Soulama left the club.

In August 2007, Soulama joined Ghanaian team Asante Kotoko.

In December 2014, Soulama joined Ghanaian team Hearts of Oak SC.

== International career ==
Soulama was a member of the Burkinabé 2004 African Nations Cup team, who finished bottom of their group in the first round of competition, thus failing to secure qualification for the quarter-finals. After about five years absence from the national side he was recalled in 2012 for a 16 May exhibition match against Benin national football team and next month's 2014 FIFA World Cup double-header qualifiers against Congo and Gabon.

== Honours ==
On 5 July 2008 Soulama was nominated as Goalkeeper of the Year 2008 in Ghana.

== Death ==
Soulama died of cancer on 27 October 2017.
