= Nathan Sinkala =

Zambian footballer (born 1990)

Personal information
- Full name: Nathan Sinkala
- Date of birth: 22 November 1990 (age 35)
- Place of birth: Chingola, Zambia
- Position: Defensive midfielder

Senior career*
Years	Team	Apps	(Gls)
2008–2012	Green Buffaloes		
2009	→ Hapoel Kiryat Shmona (loan)		
2012–2020	TP Mazembe		
2014	→ Sochaux (loan)	15	(0)
2014–2015	→ Grasshoppers (loan)	7	(0)
2020–2022	Stellenbosch	53	(5)
2023–2024	ZESCO United		

International career
2011–2021	Zambia	52	(3)
- * Club domestic league appearances and goals as of 2 September 2023

Nathan Sinkala (born 22 November 1990) is a Zambian professional footballer who most recently played as a defensive midfielder for ZESCO United. He made 52 appearances scoring 3 goals for the Zambia national team between 2011 and 2021.

== Club career ==
=== Green Buffaloes ===
Born in Chingola, Sinkala began his career in 2008 with Green Buffaloes, and spent a loan spell in Israel with Hapoel Kiryat Shmona during 2009, playing for their reserve team. At Green Buffaloes, Sinkala scored three leagues goal during the 2009 season, and two league goals during the 2010 season. He also won the Zambian Charity Shield in 2010.

=== TP Mazembe and loans ===
After participating at the 2012 Africa Cup of Nations, Sinkala signed for TP Mazembe on a three-year deal.

On 8 January 2014, Sinkala joined French Ligue 1 side Sochaux-Montbéliard on a loan deal. He later stated that he wished to remain with the club following the end of the loan deal. On 7 July 2014, Sinkala was loaned again from Mazembe, this time to Swiss Super League side Grasshopper Club Zürich.

=== Stellenbosch ===
In January 2020, he moved to Stellenbosch.

=== Zambia ===
In December 2022 he was reported as signing a six-month deal with SC Kfar Kasem in Israel. However, he returned to Zambia and ZESCO United in January 2023. He was released by ZESCO United in July 2024.

== International career ==
Sinkala made his international debut for Zambia in 2011, and participated at the 2012 Africa Cup of Nations. He was called up to Zambia's 23-man squad for the 2013 Africa Cup of Nations.

In October 2013, due to a disagreement between their club TP Mazembe and the Zambian Football Association over international call-ups, Sinkala and two other players (Rainford Kalaba and Stoppila Sunzu) were the subject of a Zambian arrest warrant. All three players later had their passports confiscated by Zambian immigration authorities, before being pardoned by the Zambian government.

In December 2014 he was named as part of Zambia's preliminary squad for the 2015 Africa Cup of Nations. He was injured in his country's opening game in the tournament.

== Personal life ==
He is the younger brother of Andrew Sinkala.

== Career statistics ==
Scores and results list Zambia's goal tally first, score column indicates score after each Sinkala goal.

List of international goals scored by Nathan Sinkala
No.	Date	Venue	Opponent	Score	Result	Competition
1	6 September 2013	Baba Yara Stadium, Kumasi, Ghana	Ghana	1–2	1–2	2014 FIFA World Cup qualification
2	6 June 2014	Raymond James Stadium, Tampa, United States	Japan	2–0	3–4	Friendly
3	27 May 2015	Royal Bafokeng Stadium, Phokeng, South Africa	Ghana	3–0	3–0	2015 COSAFA Cup
