= Alain Traoré =

Burkinabé footballer (born 1988)

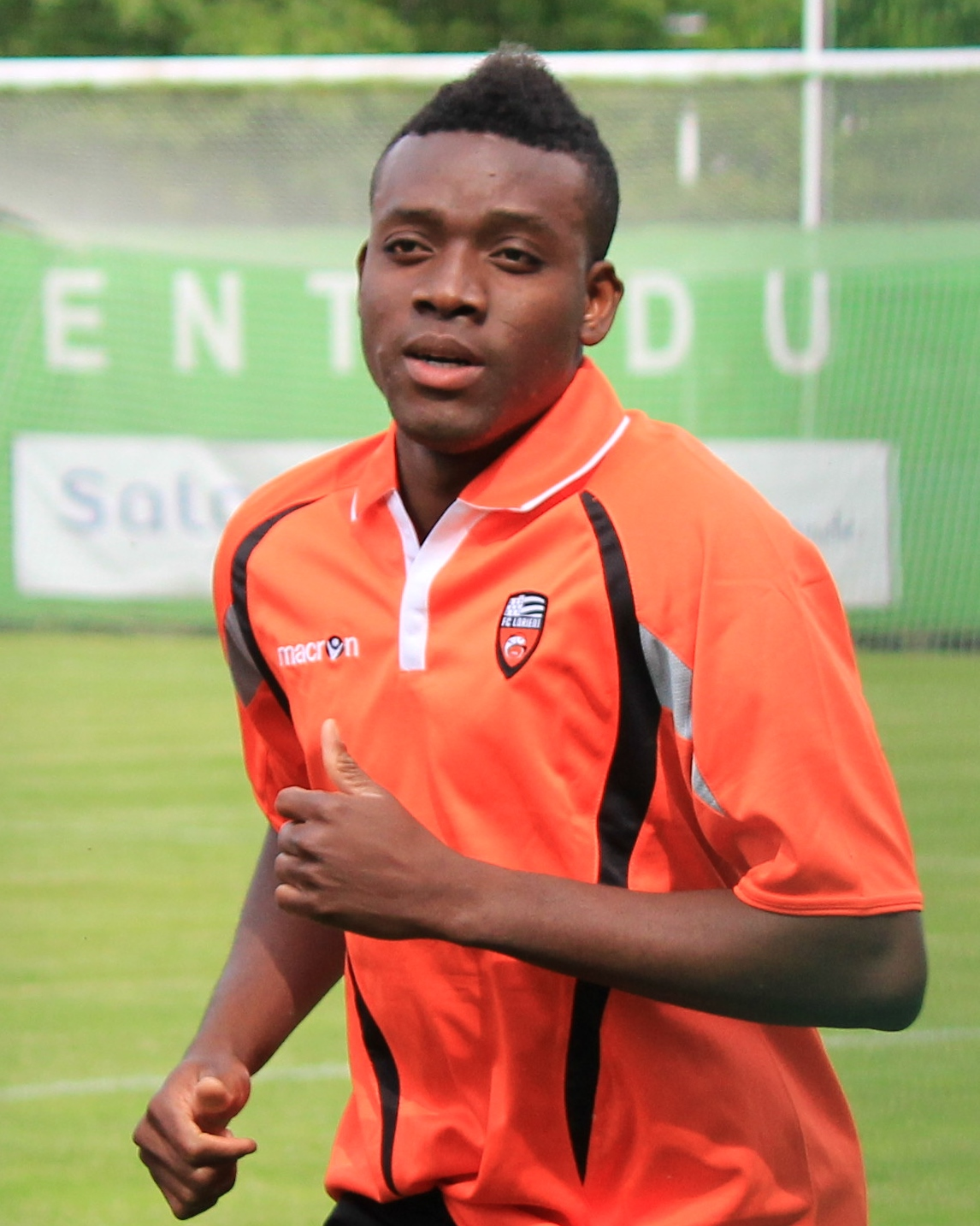
- Traoré with Lorient in 2013

Personal information
- Full name: Sibiri Alain Traoré
- Date of birth: 31 December 1988 (age 37)
- Place of birth: Bobo Dioulasso, Burkina Faso
- Height: 1.76 m (5 ft 9 in)
- Position: Striker

Team information
- Current team: Arta/Solar7
- Number: 14

Youth career
- Planète Champion

Senior career*
Years	Team	Apps	(Gls)
2004–2005	Planète Champion	19	(7)
2005–2012	Auxerre	56	(14)
2009	→ Brest (loan)	14	(3)
2010–2012	Auxerre B	5	(5)
2012–2016	Lorient	39	(8)
2014–2015	Lorient B	11	(3)
2015	→ Monaco (loan)	1	(0)
2016–2017	Kayserispor	12	(0)
2017–2018	Al-Markhiya	13	(1)
2018–2021	RS Berkane	75	(14)
2021–	Arta/Solar7	4	(4)

International career^{‡}
2006–2021	Burkina Faso	65	(21)
Medal record
Representing Burkina Faso
Africa Cup of Nations
Runner-up	2013 South Africa
Third place	2017 Gabon
- * Club domestic league appearances and goals as of 13:35, 2 August 2022 (UTC) ‡ National team caps and goals as of 17:35, 5 June 2021 (UTC)

Sibiri Alain Traoré (born 31 December 1988) is a Burkinabé professional footballer who plays as a striker for Arta/Solar7, and the Burkina Faso national team. He started his career with local side Planète Champion, before moving to France as a 17-year-old.

== Club career ==
Traoré began his career with Planète Champion in his homeland. He came to prominence whilst playing for Burkina Faso in the 2005 African U-17 Championship, with his performances earning him a one-month trial with English Premier League side Manchester United. He impressed in his trials, but was not able to sign for them due to work permit issues. He had the option of going on loan to a Belgian club, but also had interest from French Ligue 1 side Auxerre. With the decision of his mother, he joined the French side instead.

On 4 January 2009, he was loaned out to Brest for six months. He returned to Auxerre on 31 June 2009.

Traoré became a central figure in the Auxerre team. In July 2012, he joined Ligue 1 side Lorient after Auxerre were relegated to Ligue 2.

On 31 January 2015, Traoré moved on loan to Monaco till the end of the 2014–15 season, with an option for Monaco to make the deal permanent.

In July 2018, he joined Moroccan team RS Berkane on a free transfer and was part of their Confederation Cup participating side. He also scored a goal in their Confederation Cup group stage match against Sudanese team Al-Hilal.

== International career ==
Traoré represented Burkina Faso at under-17 level, where they qualified for the 2005 African U-17 Championship. He scored one goal in the 3–1 defeat to Mali. He also scored one goal in the 2012 African Cup of Nations, versus Angola. He scored the goal (in the sixth minute of injury time), which took Burkina Faso through to the 2013 African Cup of Nations at the expense of the Central African Republic, and then scored three goals in the 2013 final tournament itself.

On 4 February 2017, Traoré scored a wonderful free kick against Ghana in the third-place playoff in the 2017 Africa Cup of Nations in Gabon. The goal was scored in the 89th minute and went on to win the bronze medal for Burkina Faso.

== Personal life ==
Traoré's younger brother, Bertrand, is a professional footballer. The two were part of the Burkina Faso squad for the 2012 Africa Cup of Nations in Gabon and Equatorial Guinea.

== Career statistics ==
=== Club ===
As of 17 May 2014

Appearances and goals by club, season and competition
Club	Season	League			Coupe de France		Coupe de la Ligue		Europe		Total	
Club	Season	Division	Apps	Goals	Apps	Goals	Apps	Goals	Apps	Goals	Apps	Goals
Auxerre	2006–07	Ligue 1	4	0	0	0	0	0	0	0	4	0
Auxerre	2007–08	Ligue 1	1	0	0	0	0	0	0	0	1	0
Auxerre	2008–09	Ligue 1	3	0	0	0	0	0	0	0	3	0
Auxerre	2009–10	Ligue 1	1	0	0	0	0	0	0	0	1	0
Auxerre	2010–11	Ligue 1	20	5	1	0	1	0	3	0	25	5
Auxerre	2011–12	Ligue 1	27	9	0	0	0	0	0	0	27	9
Auxerre	Total		56	14	1	0	1	0	3	0	61	14
Brest (loan)	2008–09	Ligue 2	14	3	1	0	0	0	0	0	15	3
Lorient	2012–13	Ligue 1	14	6	0	0	0	0	0	0	14	6
Lorient	2013–14	Ligue 1	21	2	1	0	0	0	0	0	22	2
Lorient	2014–15	Ligue 1	3	0	0	0	1	0	0	0	4	0
Lorient	Total		38	8	1	0	1	0	0	0	40	8
Monaco (loan)	2014–15	Ligue 1	0	0	0	0	0	0	0	0	0	0
Career total			108	25	3	0	2	0	3	0	116	25

=== International ===
Scores and results list Burkina Faso's goal tally first, score column indicates score after each Traoré goal.

List of international goals scored by Alain Traoré
No.	Date	Venue	Opponent	Score	Result	Competition
1	8 September 2007	Stade Léopold Sédar Senghor, Dakar, Senegal	Senegal	1–1	1–5	2008 Africa Cup of Nations qualification
2	28 March 2009	Stade du 4 Août, Ouagadougou, Burkina Faso	Guinea	2–0	4–2	2010 FIFA World Cup qualification
3	11 August 2010	Stade Municipal de Senlis, Senlis, France	Congo	3–0	3–0	Friendly
4	6 September 2010	Stade Maurice Chevalier, Cannes, France	Gabon	1–1	1–1	Friendly
5	26 March 2011	Stade du 4 Août, Ouagadougou, Burkina Faso	Namibia	1–0	4–0	2012 Africa Cup of Nations qualification
6	26 March 2011	Stade du 4 Août, Ouagadougou, Burkina Faso	Namibia	2–0	4–0	2012 Africa Cup of Nations qualification
7	26 March 2011	Stade du 4 Août, Ouagadougou, Burkina Faso	Namibia	4–0	4–0	2012 Africa Cup of Nations qualification
8	4 June 2011	Independence Stadium, Windhoek, Namibia	Namibia	3–0	4–1	2012 Africa Cup of Nations qualification
9	3 September 2011	Stade du 4 Août, Ouagadougou, Burkina Faso	Equatorial Guinea	1–0	1–0	Friendly
10	22 January 2012	Estadio de Malabo, Malabo, Equatorial Guinea	Angola	1–1	1–2	2012 Africa Cup of Nations
11	14 October 2012	Stade du 4 Août, Ouagadougou, Burkina Faso	Central African Republic	1–1	3–1	2013 Africa Cup of Nations qualification
12	14 October 2012	Stade du 4 Août, Ouagadougou, Burkina Faso	Central African Republic	3–1	3–1	2013 Africa Cup of Nations qualification
13	21 January 2013	Mbombela Stadium, Nelspruit, South Africa	Nigeria	1–1	1–1	2013 Africa Cup of Nations
14	25 January 2013	Mbombela Stadium, Nelspruit, South Africa	Ethiopia	1–0	4–0	2013 Africa Cup of Nations
15	25 January 2013	Mbombela Stadium, Nelspruit, South Africa	Ethiopia	2–0	4–0	2013 Africa Cup of Nations
16	5 March 2014	Stade Francis Turcan, Martigues, France	Comoros	1–0	1–1	Friendly
17	6 September 2014	Stade du 4 Août, Ouagadougou, Burkina Faso	Lesotho	2–0	2–0	2015 Africa Cup of Nations qualification
18	10 January 2015	Mbombela Stadium, Nelspruit, South Africa	Swaziland	1–1	5–1	Friendly
19	5 June 2016	Stade de Beaumer, Moroni, Comoros	Comoros	2–0	2–0	2017 Africa Cup of Nations qualification
20	4 February 2017	Stade de Port-Gentil, Port-Gentil, Gabon	Ghana	1–0	1–0	2017 Africa Cup of Nations
21	7 October 2017	FNB Stadium, Johannesburg, South Africa	Burkina Faso	1–3	1–3	2018 FIFA World Cup qualification

== Honors ==
RS Berkane

- CAF Confederation Cup: 2019–20

Burkina Faso

- Africa Cup of Nations bronze: 2017
