= Aynalem Hailu =

Ethiopian footballer

Personal information
- Full name: Aynalem Hailu Reda
- Date of birth: 12 October 1986 (age 40)
- Place of birth: Aynalem, Mekelle
- Height: 1.85 m (6 ft 1 in)
- Position: Centre back

Team information
- Current team: Dashen Beer

Senior career*
Years	Team	Apps	(Gls)
2010–2013	Defence Force		
2013	Dedebit		
2013–	Dashen Beer		

International career^{‡}
2011–2014	Ethiopia	22	(0)
- * Club domestic league appearances and goals as of 17 October 2012 ‡ National team caps and goals as of 4 January 2014

Aynalem Hailu (Amharic: ዓይናለም ሃይሉ, born 12 October 1986) is an Ethiopian footballer. He currently plays for Dashen Beer.

== Career ==
Aynalem is central back defender. His abilities are pace, positional sense and an unswerving ability to stay calm under pressure.

== International career ==
Aynalem is part of the Ethiopia national football team since 2011. He is on the list for 2013 African Nations Cup.
