= Hugues-Wilfried Dah =

Burkinabé footballer

Personal information
- Full name: Hugues-Wilfried Hamed Dah
- Date of birth: 10 July 1986 (age 40)
- Place of birth: Ouagadougou, Burkina Faso
- Height: 1.79 m (5 ft 10 1/2 in)
- Position: Striker

Team information
- Current team: Salitas FC

Senior career*
Years	Team	Apps	(Gls)
2004–2006	ASFA Yennenga	44	(30)
2006	Renacimiento		
2007–2008	FC 105 Libreville	17	(10)
2008–2009	Coton Sport	22	(14)
2009–2010	Busaiteen		
2010–2011	Al Urooba	20	(12)
2011–2012	Al Nahda		
2012–2014	Al-Dhaid	22	(11)
2014–2015	EGS Gafsa	22	(6)
2016–2017	EO Sidi Bouzid	13	(0)
2017–	Salitas FC		

International career^{‡}
2012–2013	Burkina Faso	4	(0)
Medal record
Representing Burkina Faso
Africa Cup of Nations
Runner-up	2013 South Africa
- * Club domestic league appearances and goals as of 18:17, 4 May 2018 (UTC) ‡ National team caps and goals as of 18:17, 4 May 2018 (UTC)

Hugues-Wilfried Hamed Dah (born 10 July 1986) is a Burkinabé international footballer who plays for Emirati team Al-Thaid, as a striker.

== Club career ==
Born in Ouagadougou, Dah has played club football in Burkina Faso, Equatorial Guinea, Gabon, Cameroon, Bahrain, United Arab Emirates and Oman for ASFA Yennenga, Renacimiento, FC 105 Libreville, Coton Sport, Busaiteen, Al Urooba, Al Nahda, Al-Thaid, EGS Gafsa, EO Sidi Bouzid and Salitas FC.

== International career ==
He made his international debut for Burkina Faso in 2012.
