= Abebaw Butako =

Ethiopian footballer

Personal information
- Date of birth: 20 April 1987 (age 39)
- Place of birth: Arba Minch, Ethiopia
- Height: 1.76 m (5 ft 9 in)
- Position: Left back

Team information
- Current team: Arba Minch FC
- Number: 14

Youth career
- Saint George

Senior career*
Years	Team	Apps	(Gls)
2005–2014	Saint George		
2014–2015	Al-Hilal Omdurman		
2015–	Arba Minch FC		

International career^{‡}
2008–2017	Ethiopia	46	(2)
- * Club domestic league appearances and goals ‡ National team caps and goals as of 29 January 2013

Abebaw Butako (Amharic: ዓበባው ቡጣቆ, born 20 April 1987) is an Ethiopian professional footballer. He currently plays for the Arba Minch FC.

== Career ==
Abebaw is a defender and is part of the Ethiopia national football team. He began his career with Saint-George SA, the club where he played from 2005 - 2014. In August 2014 he transferred to one of Sudan's giant club Al-Hilal Omdurman. A year later he signed with his hometown club Arba Minch City, who made him the Ethiopian Premier League's highest-paid player with a salary of 75,000 birr a month.

== International career ==
Abebaw debuted for Ethiopia in 2008. He was on the final list of players called for 2013 African Nations Cup.

=== International goals ===
Scores and results list Ethiopia's goal tally first.

No	Date	Venue	Opponent	Score	Result	Competition
1.	7 December 2010	National Stadium, Dar es Salaam, Tanzania	Zambia	1–0	2–1	2010 CECAFA Cup
2.	15 October 2014	Stade du 26 Mars, Bamako, Mali	Mali	3–2	3–1	2015 Africa Cup of Nations qualification
