= Zerihun Tadele =

Ethiopian footballer

Personal information
- Full name: Zerihun Tadele Derese
- Date of birth: 31 October 1989 (age 37)
- Place of birth: Addis Ababa, Ethiopia
- Position: Goalkeeper

Senior career*
| Years | Team | Apps | (Gls) |
| 2010– | Saint George FC | | |

International career^{‡}
| 2011– | Ethiopia | 4 | (0) |
- * Club domestic league appearances and goals ‡ National team caps and goals as of 29 January 2013

Zerihun Tadele Derese (Amharic: ዘሪሁን ታደለ ደረሰ, born 31 October 1989) is an Ethiopian international football goalkeeper who currently plays for Saint George FC in the Ethiopian Premier League.

== International career ==
Zerihun made his Ethiopian national team début in a 2012 Africa Cup of Nations qualification game versus Nigeria on 27 March 2011 that saw Ethiopia lose 4–0. His second cap came in the friendly game against Tanzania on 11 January 2013.
