= Dawit Estifanos =

Ethiopian footballer

Personal information
- Full name: Dawit Estifanos
- Date of birth: 27 February 1988 (age 38)
- Place of birth: bale zone, Oromia State, Ethiopia
- Position: Midfielder

Team information
- Current team: Jimma Aba Jifar
- Number: 10

Senior career*
Years	Team	Apps	(Gls)
2014–	Ethiopian Coffee F.C.	0	(0)

International career^{‡}
2013–	Ethiopia	4	(0)
- * Club domestic league appearances and goals as of 17:26, 23 November 2014 (UTC) ‡ National team caps and goals as of 17:26, 23 November 2014 (UTC)

Dawit Estifanos (born 27 February 1988) is an Ethiopian professional footballer who plays as a midfielder for Ethiopian Higher League club Jimma Aba Jifar.

== Honours ==
Ethiopian Coffee

Winner

- Ethiopian Premier League: 2010–11

Runner-up

- Ethiopian Premier League: 2013–14
