= Sunday Mba =

Nigerian footballer (born 1988)

Personal information
- Date of birth: 28 November 1988 (age 37)
- Place of birth: Aba, Nigeria
- Height: 1.82 m (6 ft 0 in)
- Position: Attacking midfielder

Youth career
- 2004: Pepsi Football Academy

Senior career*
Years	Team	Apps	(Gls)
2005–2006	Enyimba		
2007	Enugu Rangers		
2007–2008	Enyimba		
2008–2009	Enugu Rangers		
2009–2010	Dolphins		
2010–2013	Warri Wolves		
2013	→ Rangers (loan)		
2014–2015	CA Bastia	43	(5)
2015–2017	Yeni Malatyaspor	54	(8)

International career
2012–2014	Nigeria	21	(5)
Medal record
Men's football
Representing Nigeria
Africa Cup of Nations
Winner	2013 South Africa
- * Club domestic league appearances and goals

Sunday Mba MON (born 28 November 1988) is a Nigerian former professional footballer who played as an attacking midfielder.

== Club career ==
Mba joined Rangers on loan in May 2013 from Warri Wolves. He scored in his Rangers' debut, a 3–1 loss to Clube Recreativo Desportivo do Libolo in the 2013 CAF Champions League He signed for Bastia in December after a drawn-out negotiation that lasted most of the year.

In October 2019, after two years without a club, he said he wanted to return to active football.

== International career ==
He was a member of the Nigeria B team that won the 2010 WAFU Nations Cup. He made his senior debut in the Eagles' 0–0 tie against Angola in January 2012. He scored a brace against Liberia in his next game.

He was called up to Nigeria's 23-man squad for the 2013 Africa Cup of Nations. Mba scored the winning goal in Nigeria's 2–1 quarter-final win over Ivory Coast. On 10 February 2013, in the final against Burkina Faso, he scored the only goal of the game, to hand Nigeria their third Africa Cup of Nations title.

He was selected for Nigeria's squad at the 2013 FIFA Confederations Cup.

== Honours ==
- Africa Cup of Nations: 2013

Orders

- Member of the Order of the Niger
