= Minyahil Teshome =

Ethiopian footballer (born 1985)

Minyahil Teshome Beyene
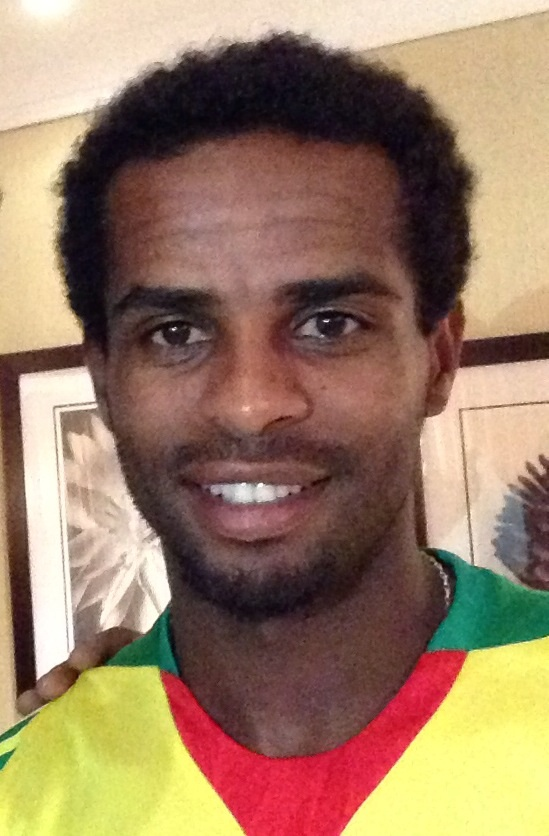
- Teshome at the 2014 CHAN games in South Africa

Personal information
- Full name: Minyahil Teshome Beyene
- Date of birth: 14 November 1985 (age 40)
- Place of birth: Addis Ababa, Ethiopia
- Height: 1.75 m (5 ft 9 in)
- Position: Midfielder

Team information
- Current team: Saint George

Senior career*
Years	Team	Apps	(Gls)
2004–2012	Ethiopian Coffee		
2012–2013	Dedebit		
2013–	Saint George		

International career^{‡}
2011–	Ethiopia	22	(1)
- * Club domestic league appearances and goals as of 22 January 2014 ‡ National team caps and goals as of 7 September 2013

Minyahil Teshome (Amharic: ምንያህል ተሾመ, born 14 November 1985) is an Ethiopian footballer. He currently plays for Saint George, based in Addis Ababa, Ethiopia.

== Career ==
Minyahil is a left-footed. He began his career with Ethiopian Coffee FC, and joined Dedebit in 2012.

== International career ==
He is part of the Ethiopia national football team since 2011. He is on the list for 2013 African Nations Cup.

In January 2014, coach Sewnet Bishaw invited him to be a part of the Ethiopia squad for the 2014 African Nations Championship. The team was eliminated in the group stages after losing to Congo, Libya and Ghana.
