= Yared Zinabu =

Ethiopian footballer

Personal information
- Date of birth: 22 June 1989 (age 37)
- Place of birth: Addis Ababa, Ethiopia
- Height: 1.82 m (6 ft 0 in)
- Positions: Left winger; centre midfielder

Team information
- Current team: Saint-George SA
- Number: 20

Senior career*
Years	Team	Apps	(Gls)
2005–2010	Adama City		
2010–	Saint-George		

International career^{‡}
2007–	Ethiopia	24	(0)
- * Club domestic league appearances and goals ‡ National team caps and goals as of 29 January 2013

Yared Zinabu (Amharic: ያሬድ ዝናቡ, born 22 June 1989) is an Ethiopian footballer. He currently plays for Saint-George SA and is a member of the Ethiopian national football team.

== Career ==
Yared is left wing or central midfielder, however, he can play left back position, too. He currently plays for Saint-George SA.

== International career ==
Yared debuted for Ethiopia in 2007. He is on the final list of players called for 2013 African Nations Cup.
