= Mohamed Koffi =

Burkinabé footballer (born 1986)

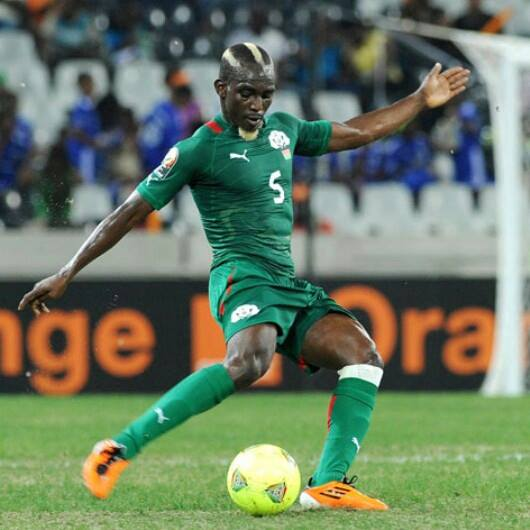
- Koffi playing for Burkina Faso in 2013

Personal information
- Date of birth: 30 December 1986 (age 39)
- Place of birth: Abidjan, Ivory Coast
- Height: 1.80 m (5 ft 11 in)
- Position: Center back

Team information
- Current team: National Bank of Egypt

Youth career
- 1995–1999: Ecole de Football Attécoubé

Senior career*
Years	Team	Apps	(Gls)
2000	E.C.A.F.	10	(5)
2001	Young Stars	0	(0)
2002–2004	Stella Club d'Adjamé	38	(5)
2004–2006	Al-Markhiya	19	(13)
2005	→ Al-Sailiya (loan)	0	(0)
2006–2013	Petrojet	103	(19)
2014	Duhok	13	(4)
2014–2017	Zamalek	69	(3)
2016–2017	→ Al-Ettifaq (loan)	24	(1)
2017–2019	Al-Masry	46	(6)
2019	Al-Kawkab		
2019–2020	Smouha	26	(2)
2020–2021	National Bank of Egypt	7	(0)

International career
2006–2016	Burkina Faso	49	(4)
Medal record
Representing Burkina Faso
Africa Cup of Nations
Runner-up	2013 South Africa
- * Club domestic league appearances and goals

Mohamed Koffi (born 30 December 1986) is an Ivorian-born Burkinabé professional footballer.

== Personal life ==
Mohamed's younger brother is also a football player, Abdoulaye Koffi.

== Club career ==
=== Youth career ===
Mohammed began his footballing career in 1995 with his hometown, Abidjan-based Ecole de Football Attécoubé of Attécoubé where he played for 4 consecutive years.

=== E.C.A.F. ===
In 2000, he began his professional footballing career with E.C.A.F. of Ligue 2. He scored 5 goals in 10 appearances in the 2000–01 Ligue 2.

=== Young Stars ===
In 2001, he moved to another Ligue 2 club, Young Stars F.C. of Ivory Coast. He made 10 appearances in the 2001–02 Coupe de Côte d'Ivoire de football.

=== Stella Club d'Adjamé ===
In 2002, he signed a two-year contract with the nation's famous, Ligue 1 club, Stella Club d'Adjamé. He scored 5 goals in 38 appearances in the two consecutive seasons of Ligue 1. He also made 4 appearances in the 2004 CAF Confederation Cup which included a 3–1 aggregate win over Equatorial Guinea's Deportivo Mongomo in the Round of 32 and a 1–2 aggregate loss against Morocco's Wydad Casablanca.

=== Al-Markhiya ===
He first moved out of Ivory Coast in 2004 to the Middle East and more accurately to Qatar where he signed a two-year contract with Qatar 2nd Division club, Al-Markhiya. He scored 13 goals in 19 appearances in the two consecutive seasons of the Qatar 2nd Division for the Doha-based club.

=== Al-Sailiya ===
While he was with the Qatar 2nd Division club, in 2005 the club loaned the Burkinabé international on a two-month contract to Qatar Stars League club, Al-Sailiya SC. He made 5 appearances for the Doha-based club in the 2005–06 Emir of Qatar Cup.

=== Petrojet ===
In 2006, he again moved out of Ivory Coast and this time to North African nation, Egypt where he signed a long-term contract with Egyptian Premier League club, and newly founded in the 2006–07 Egyptian Premier League, Petrojet FC.

He scored 6 goals in 28 appearances in the inaugural Egyptian Premier League season of the club helping them secure the 7th position in the 2006–07 Egyptian Premier League. He scored 4 goals in 24 appearances in the 2007–08 Egyptian Premier League helping them secure the 5th position in the 2007–08 season.

He scored 4 goals in 23 appearances in the 2008–09 Egyptian Premier League which included a 6–2 win over El-Gaish SC, a 2–2 draw against Al-Masry SC, a 1–1 draw against Ittihad El Shorta and a 3–1 loss against Al-Masry SC. helping his club secure the 3rd position in the 2008–09 season and also earning them a place in the 2010 CAF Confederation Cup.

He scored 3 goals in 25 appearances in the 2009–10 Egyptian Premier League which included a goal in a 2–2 draw against El-Entag El-Harby SC and a brace in a 3–2 win over Asyut Petroleum helping his club secure the 4th position in the 2009–10 season. He also scored 1 goal in 6 appearances in the 2010 CAF Confederation Cup which included a 4–2 aggregate win over Zanzibar's Miembeni S.C. in the preliminary round, a 5–1 aggregate win over Sudan's Al-Khartoum SC in the first round and a 2–1 aggregate loss against Tunisia's CS Sfaxien in the Round of 16.

He made his first appearance in the 2010–11 Egyptian Premier League on 6 August 2010 in a 1–0 loss against Ismaily SC and scored his first goal on 13 September 2010 in a 2–1 win over Misr El-Makasa SC. He scored 5 goals in 28 appearances in the 2010–11 season.

He made his first appearance and scored his first goal in the 2011–12 Egyptian Premier League on 14 October 2011 in a 3–1 loss against Ismaily SC. In an unfinished season of the Egyptian Premier League which was suspended due to the Port Said Stadium riot, he scored 4 goals in 10 appearances.

He made his first appearance in the 2012–13 Egyptian Premier League on 21 February 2013 in a 3–0 loss against one of Egypt's top most clubs, Zamalek SC and scored his only goal of the 2012–13 Egyptian Premier League season on 9 May 2013 in a 2–1 win over the same club, Zamalek SC. In another unfinished season of the Egyptian Premier League which was suspended due to security reasons following the 2013 Egyptian coup d'état, he scored 1 goal in 8 appearances.

He scored 28 goals in a record 153 appearances in the seven-year long spell with the Suez-based club.

=== Duhok ===
After a seven-year long spell in Egypt with Petrojet FC, he left for another Middle Eastern country and this time to Iraq where on 22 January 2014, he signed a six-month short-term contract with Iraqi Premier League club, Duhok SC. He scored his first goal for the club on 4 April 2014 in a 2–2 draw against Baghdad-based, Al-Masafi. He scored 4 goals in 13 appearances for the Dohuk-based club in the 2013–14 Iraqi Premier League.

=== Zamalek ===
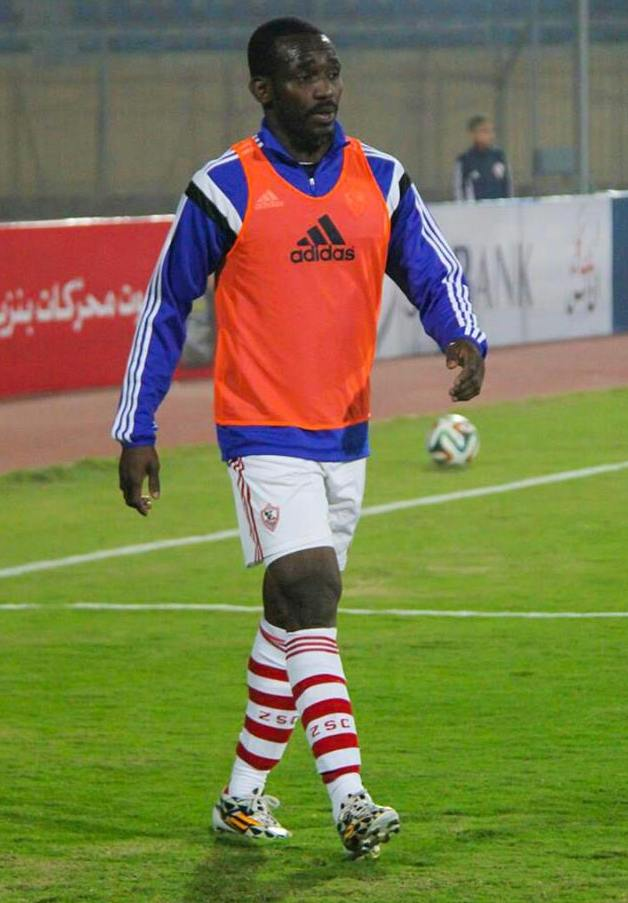
Mohamed Koffi – Zamalek SC

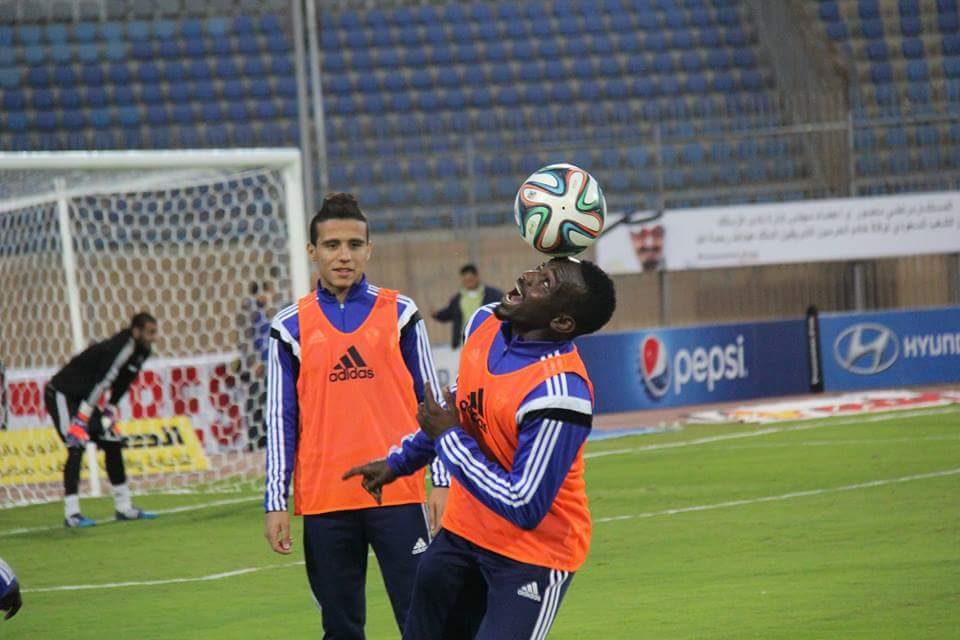
Mohamed Koffi – Zamalek SC

While he was in Iraq with the Dohuk-based club, news speculated that he will move back to Egypt and the country's top most clubs like Zamalek SC and Al Ahly SC were reportedly interested in obtaining the services of the Burkinabé international.

After a short stint in Iraq with Duhok SC, he moved back to Egypt where on 7 September 2014, he signed a four-year long-term contract with 2014 Egypt Cup winners, Zamalek SC. He scored his first goal for the Giza-based club on 28 May 2015 in a 5–1 win over Ittihad El Shorta in the 2014–15 Egyptian Premier League season. He made 3 appearances for the Giza-based club in the 2014 CAF Champions League in the group stage which included a 0–0 draw against Democratic Republic of the Congo's TP Mazembe, a 1–0 loss against another Congolese club, AS Vita and a 2–1 loss against Sudan's, Al-Hilal Club.

He made his 2015 CAF Confederation Cup first appearance on 15 March 2015 in a 3–1 win over Rwanda's Rayon Sports F.C. at the El-Gouna Stadium in the first round of the competition.

He helped the Egyptian side win the Egyptian Premier League in the 2014–15 season after a gap of 12 years.

During his inaugural season with Zamalek, he was quoted saying that, "I hold the nationality of Zamalek", appreciating the love he received from the fans of the Egyptian giants spread across the world.

On 21 September 2015, he helped his side lift the 2015 Egypt Cup after a 2–0 win over fierce rivals, Al Ahly SC, thus helping them complete a hat-trick win of the nation's prestigious cup tournament and also taking the tally to 24 Egypt Cup titles.

At the end of the season, he was also awarded with the "Best Foreign Player" of the year award by the Egyptian Football Association.

His form in the 2014–15 season both for his club and the national team saw him nominated for the 2014–15 CAF African Footballer (Based in Africa) of the year award.

=== Al-Masry ===
In 2017, Koffi signed for Al-Masry, where he reached the 2018 CAF Confederation Cup semi-finals.

=== Al-Kawkab ===
In early 2019, he moved to Saudi club Al-Kawkab.

=== Return to Egypt ===
In July 2019, he joined Smouha, then he signed for National Bank of Egypt in November 2020.

== International career ==
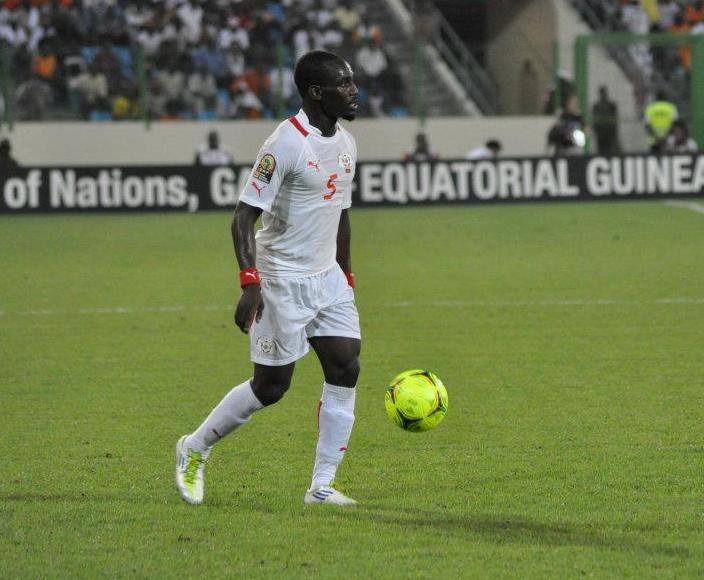
Mohamed Koffi – 2012 Africa Cup of Nations

Mohamed is part of the first team squad of the Burkina Faso national football team. He was selected for the national team for the first time in 2006. He made his first appearance and scored his first goal for Burkina Faso national football team on 15 November 2006 in a 2–1 win over Algeria national football team in a friendly match. He has made an appearance in the 2010 Africa Cup of Nations in a 1–0 loss against Ghana national football team when he came on as a substitute for Paul Koulibaly a few minutes before the full-time, he has made appearances in the 2010 FIFA World Cup qualification, the 2012 Africa Cup of Nations, the 2013 Africa Cup of Nations when he helped his nation achieve the runners-up position in the tournament, losing narrowly 1–0 to African giants, Nigeria in the finals which is also country's best achievement in the competition's history, the 2014 FIFA World Cup qualification and the 2015 Africa Cup of Nations.
