= Asrat Megersa =

Ethiopian footballer

Personal information
- Full name: Asrat Megersa Gobena
- Date of birth: 20 June 1987 (age 39)
- Place of birth: Addis Ababa, Ethiopia
- Position: Defensive midfielder

Team information
- Current team: Wolkite City
- Number: 8

Senior career*
Years	Team	Apps	(Gls)
2008–2013	EEPCO	?	(?)
2013	Hapoel Ramat HaSharon	1	(0)
2013–2016	Dashen Beer		
2016–2018	Dedebit		
2018–2022	Welwalo Adigrat University		
2022–	Wolkite City	28	(1)

International career
2011–2016	Ethiopia	29	(1)
- * Club domestic league appearances and goals as of 6 July 2023

Asrat Megersa (Amharic: አስራት መገርሳ; born 20 June 1987) is an Ethiopian professional footballer who plays as a defensive midfielder for Ethiopian Premier League club Wolkite City.

== Career ==
In 2012, he played 7 out of the 11 national team games.

== International career ==
Asrat debuted in 2011 and so far has collected 13 caps.
