= Alula Girma =

Ethiopian footballer

Personal information
- Full name: Alula Girma Mekonnen
- Date of birth: 15 July 1993 (age 33)
- Height: 1.79 m (5 ft 10 in)
- Position: Right back

Team information
- Current team: Saint-George SA

Senior career*
Years	Team	Apps	(Gls)
2008–	Saint-George SA		

International career^{‡}
2010–	Ethiopia	24	(0)
- * Club domestic league appearances and goals ‡ National team caps and goals as of 29 January 2013

Alula Girma (Amharic: አሉላ ግርማ, born 15 July 1993) is an Ethiopian footballer. He currently plays for Saint-George SA.

== Career ==
Alula is right back defender and is part of the Ethiopia national football team. The Saint-George player's displays have attracted rave reviews and interest from clubs in Egypt and Tunisia. Alula is a product of Saint-George youth system. His first appearance for the first team came in the 2008 Super cup match against Ethiopia Bunna, a game that Kidus Giorgis won 4–2. He was given more opportunities with the first team, on the right back side. He went on to make most appearances for the first team that season as Kidus Giorgis finished safely in 1st place. Alula is now an important first team member, and putting in some brilliant performances.

== International career ==
Alula debuted for Ethiopia in 2010. He is on the final list of players called for 2013 African Nations Cup.
