= Birhanu Bogale =

Ethiopian footballer

Birhanu Bogale (Fadiga)
Personal information
- Date of birth: 27 February 1986 (age 40)
- Place of birth: Mekelle, Ethiopia
- Position: Left winger

Team information
- Current team: Dedebit

Senior career*
Years	Team	Apps	(Gls)
2007–2010	EEPCO		
2010–	Dedebit		

International career^{‡}
2007–	Ethiopia	22	(1)
- * Club domestic league appearances and goals as of 17 October 2012 ‡ National team caps and goals as of 29 January 2013

Birhanu Bogale (Amharic: ብርሁኑ ቦጋለ (ፋዲጋ), born 27 February 1986) is an Ethiopian footballer. He currently plays for Dedebit FC and is a member of the Ethiopian national football team. Hi's younger sister Senayit Bogale (Amharic: ሰናይት ቦጋለ plays for the Commercial Bank of Ethiopia(CBE) or የኢትዮጲያ ንግድ ባንክ

== Career ==
Birhanu is a left full-back, and He played for Dedebit FC in 2010 GC.

== International career ==
He has been part of the Ethiopia national football team since 2007. He is on the list for 2013 African Nations Cup.
