= Degu Debebe =

Ethiopian footballer (born 1982)

Personal information
- Full name: Degu Debebe Gebreyes
- Date of birth: 1 January 1996 (age 30)
- Place of birth: Arba Minch, Ethiopia
- Height: 1.83 m (6 ft 0 in)
- Position: Centre-back

Youth career
- –2002: Arba Minch City

Senior career*
Years	Team	Apps	(Gls)
2002–2004	Arba Minch City		
2004–2018	Saint George		
2019–2023	Wolaitta Dicha	71	(3)

International career^{‡}
2003–2014	Ethiopia	51	(0)
- * Club domestic league appearances and goals as of 29 June 2023 ‡ National team caps and goals as of 13 January 2014

Degu Debebe Gebreyes (Amharic: ደጉ ደበበ; born 19 March 1982) is an Ethiopian former professional footballer who played as a centre-back.

== Career ==
Degu is a defender and is part of the Ethiopia national football team. He began his career with Arba Minch City FC. In the summer of 2004, he joined Saint-George SA. He was voted player of the 04/05 season and received 1,000 birr prize money. Since his arriving, Degu is a model of consistency, rarely making errors and has helped the club win 6 Premier League titles.

== International career ==
Degu debuted for Ethiopia in 2003. With 46 caps he is one of the most capped players in Ethiopian history. He is also the captain of the team.

== Honours ==
=== Saint George SC ===
- First Division/Ethiopian Premier League

2005, 2006, 2008, 2009, 2010, 2012, 2014, 2015, 2016, 2017

- Ethiopian Cup

2011, 2016

- Ethiopian Super Cup

2005, 2006, 2009, 2010, 2015, 2017

- Addis Ababa City Cup

2009, 2010, 2011, 2013, 2017
