= Sisay Bancha =

Ethiopian footballer

Personal information
- Full name: Sisay Bancha Basa
- Date of birth: 24 August 1989 (age 37)
- Place of birth: Sidama Zone, Ethiopia
- Height: 1.81 m (5 ft 11 in)
- Position: Goalkeeper

Team information
- Current team: Dedebit

Senior career*
Years	Team	Apps	(Gls)
2008–2012	Ethiopian Coffee		
2012–	Dedebit		

International career^{‡}
2012–	Ethiopia	6	(0)
- * Club domestic league appearances and goals ‡ National team caps and goals as of 29 January 2013

Sisay Bancha (Amharic: ሲሳይ ባንጫ, 24 August 1989) is an Ethiopian professional football player who currently plays for the Ethiopian Premier League team Dedebit and the number one goalkeeper of the current Ethiopian national football team.

== Career ==
Sisay Bancha transferred from Sidama Coffee to Dedebit in July 2012. In 2008, he received the Ethiopian Goalkeeper of the Year award.

== International career ==
Sisay debuted for Ethiopia in 2012, and so far has collected 6 caps, being sent off in two of them.
