= Daouda Diakité (Burkinabé footballer) =

Burkinabé footballer

Personal information
- Date of birth: 30 March 1983 (age 43)
- Place of birth: Ouagadougou, Republic of Upper Volta
- Height: 1.83 m (6 ft 0 in)
- Position: Goalkeeper

Youth career
- Planète Champion

Senior career*
Years	Team	Apps	(Gls)
2002–2005	Étoile Filante		
2005–2011	Al-Mokawloon al-Arab		
2011–2012	K.V. Turnhout	15	(0)
2012–2013	Lierse S.K.	0	(0)
2013–2014	CF Mounana		
2014–2016	Free State Stars	27	(0)
2016–2017	AS Vita Club		
2017	AS Tanda		
2018	Étoile Filante		
2018–2020	Salitas FC		

International career^{‡}
2003–2018	Burkina Faso	46	(0)
Medal record
Representing Burkina Faso
Africa Cup of Nations
Runner-up	2013 South Africa
- * Club domestic league appearances and goals as of 1 May 2023 ‡ National team caps and goals as of 1 May 2023

Daouda Diakité (born 30 March 1983) is a Burkinabé football goalkeeper.

Diakité capped with the Burkina Faso national football team, and played at the 2003 FIFA World Youth Championship.
