= Paul Koulibaly =

Burkinabé footballer

Personal information
- Full name: Keba Paul Koulibaly
- Date of birth: 24 March 1986 (age 40)
- Place of birth: Ouagadougou, Burkina Faso
- Height: 1.83 m (6 ft 0 in)
- Positions: Left-back; centre-back

Team information
- Current team: EFO

Youth career
- EFO

Senior career*
Years	Team	Apps	(Gls)
2005–2008	EFO	54	(8)
2008–2009	Al Nasr	22	(2)
2009–2010	Al-Ittihad	24	(5)
2010–2011	Asswehly	23	(2)
2012	R.O.C. de Charleroi-Marchienne	7	(0)
2012	Dinamo București	15	(0)
2013–2014	Al Shorta	20	(0)
2014–2016	Horoya AC	21	(4)
2017	ASEC Mimosas		
2017–	EFO		

International career^{‡}
2006–2015	Burkina Faso	49	(0)
Medal record
Representing Burkina Faso
Africa Cup of Nations
Runner-up	South Africa 2013
- * Club domestic league appearances and goals as of 3 July 2019 ‡ National team caps and goals as of 10 January 2015

Keba Paul Koulibaly (born 24 March 1986) is a Burkinabé footballer who plays as a defender for EFO and the Burkina Faso national team. He plays as a centre-back or a left-back.

== Personal life ==
Paul's twin brother, Pierre Koulibaly is also a professional footballer.

== Club ==
Paul Koulibaly began his career with EFO in Burkina Faso.

In January 2008, he signed a contract with Al-Ittihad Tripoli club, but due to the maximum numbers of foreigners players playing in squad, they loaned him out to Al-Nasr Benghazi.

He went for a trial with Leeds United towards the end of July 2010, but was not kept.

In 2010–2011, he played for Asswehly and then left for R.O.C. de Charleroi-Marchienne.

In 2012, he moved to Dinamo București. Won the 2012 Romanian Supercup with the club. After playing in the club for six months, he went to the Iraqi club Al Shorta. He won the Iraqi Premier League with the club.

In 2014, he moved to the Guinean club Horoya AC. With him he won all the trophies in Guinea (championship, cup and super cup). In 2017 he returned to the EFO.

Koulibaly made his debut for Burkina Faso in 2006. Together with the Burkina Faso national team, he took part in four African Cups of Nations. In 2013, together with her, he reached the final of the tournament, where his team lost to Nigeria 0–1. On January 10, 2015, Koulibaly played his last international match in a friendly against Swaziland.

== Honours ==
=== Team ===
EFO

- Burkinabé Premier League: 2008
- Coupe du Faso: 2006, 2008

Dinamo București

- Romanian Supercup: 2012

Al-Shorta

- Iraqi Premier League: 2012–13

== Trivia ==
His twin brother Pan Pierre Koulibaly is also a footballer.
