= 2012 Arab Cup squads =

The 2012 Arab Cup was an international football tournament held in Saudi Arabia from 22 June to 6 July 2012. The 12 national teams involved in the tournament were required to register a squad of 23 players; only players in these squads were eligible to take part in the tournament. Three of the named players had to be goalkeepers.

All participating nations had to submit details of their squad to the Union of Arab Football Associations (UAFA) by 10 June 2012.

== Group A ==
=== Saudi Arabia ===
Coach: (Netherlands) Frank Rijkaard

| No. | Pos. | Player | Date of birth (age) | Caps | Goals | Club |
|---|---|---|---|---|---|---|
| 1 | GK | Khalid Sharhili | 3 February 1987 (aged 25) | 0 | 0 | (Saudi Arabian Football Federation) Al-Hilal |
| 21 | GK | Ahmed Al-Kassar | 8 May 1991 (aged 21) | 0 | 0 | (Saudi Arabian Football Federation) Al-Raed |
| 22 | GK | Hussain Shae'an | 23 May 1989 (aged 23) | 0 | 0 | (Saudi Arabian Football Federation) Al-Shabab |
| 2 | DF | Mansoor Al-Harbi | 19 October 1987 (aged 24) | 4 | 0 | (Saudi Arabian Football Federation) Al-Ahli |
| 3 | DF | Yahya Al-Musalem | 7 January 1987 (aged 25) | 0 | 0 | (Saudi Arabian Football Federation) Al-Hilal |
| 4 | DF | Ageel Balghaith | 15 March 1987 (aged 25) | 0 | 0 | (Saudi Arabia) Al-Ahli |
| 12 | DF | Khalid Al-Ghamdi | 28 March 1988 (aged 24) | 0 | 0 | (Saudi Arabian Football Federation) Al-Nasr |
| 13 | DF | Sultan Al-Bargan | 15 February 1983 (aged 29) | 0 | 0 | (Saudi Arabian Football Federation) Al-Ettifaq |
| 14 | DF | Abdullah Shuhail | 22 January 1985 (aged 27) | 38 | 1 | (Saudi Arabian Football Federation) Al-Shabab |
| 19 | DF | Ahmad Akash | 27 August 1990 (aged 21) | 0 | 0 | (Saudi Arabian Football Federation) Al-Ettifaq |
| 23 | DF | Hassan Khairat | 13 November 1987 (aged 24) | 2 | 0 | (Saudi Arabian Football Federation) Al-Hilal |
| 5 | MF | Abdulatif Al-Ghanam | 16 July 1985 (aged 26) | 25 | 1 | (Saudi Arabian Football Federation) Al-Hilal |
| 6 | MF | Khaled Al-Zylaeei | 24 August 1987 (aged 24) | 6 | 0 | (Saudi Arabian Football Federation) Al-Nasr |
| 8 | MF | Fahad Hamad | 23 November 1989 (aged 22) | 0 | 0 | (Saudi Arabian Football Federation) Al-Shabab |
| 16 | MF | Abdulmalek Al-Khaibri | 13 March 1986 (aged 26) | 1 | 0 | (Saudi Arabian Football Federation) Al-Shabab |
| 17 | MF | Abdulmajeed Al-Ruwaili | 28 August 1986 (aged 25) | 0 | 0 | (Saudi Arabian Football Federation) Al-Shabab |
| 18 | MF | Saud Hamood | 17 August 1989 (aged 22) | 3 | 0 | (Saudi Arabian Football Federation) Al-Nasr |
| 7 | FW | Hamdan Al-Hamdan | 2 December 1984 (aged 27) | 0 | 0 | (Saudi Arabian Football Federation) Al-Fateh |
| 9 | FW | Essa Al-Mehyani | 22 June 1983 (aged 29) | 17 | 5 | (Saudi Arabian Football Federation) Al-Ahli |
| 10 | FW | Mohammad Al-Sahlawi | 10 January 1987 (aged 25) | 3 | 2 | (Saudi Arabian Football Federation) Al-Nassr |
| 11 | FW | Rabee Sufyani | 26 January 1987 (aged 25) | 0 | 0 | (Saudi Arabian Football Federation) Al-Fateh |
| 15 | FW | Zamil Al-Sulim | 29 October 1989 (aged 22) | 0 | 0 | (Saudi Arabian Football Federation) Al-Ettifaq |
| 20 | FW | Mukhtar Fallatah | 15 October 1987 (aged 24) | 1 | 0 | (Saudi Arabian Football Federation) Al-Shabab |

=== Kuwait ===
Coach: (Serbia) Goran Tufegdžić

| No. | Pos. | Player | Date of birth (age) | Caps | Goals | Club |
|---|---|---|---|---|---|---|
| 1 | GK | Khalid Al-Rashidi | 20 April 1978 (aged 34) | 13 | 0 | (Kuwait Football Association) Al-Arabi |
| 12 | GK | Ahmed Al-Khaldi | | | | |
| 22 | GK | Nawaf Al-Khaldi (C) | 25 May 1981 (aged 31) | 74 | 0 | (Kuwait Football Association) Qadsia |
| 2 | DF | Amer Al-Fadhel | 21 April 1988 (aged 24) | 24 | 0 | (Kuwait Football Association) Qadsia |
| 19 | DF | Ahmad Al-Rashidi | 16 August 1983 (aged 28) | 13 | 2 | (Kuwait Football Association) Al-Arabi |
| 3 | DF | Fahad Awadh | 26 February 1985 (aged 27) | 36 | 1 | (Kuwait Football Association) Al Kuwait |
| 6 | DF | Khaled Al Qahtani | 16 February 1985 (aged 27) | 17 | 0 | (Kuwait Football Association) Qadsia |
| 13 | DF | Musaed Neda | 8 July 1983 (aged 28) | 88 | 15 | (Kuwait Football Association) Qadsia |
| 5 | DF | Mohammad Rashed | 1 July 1987 (aged 24) | 39 | 0 | (Kuwait Football Association) Qadsia |
| 10 | MF | Abdulaziz Al-Misha'an | 19 October 1988 (aged 23) | 16 | 2 | (Kuwait Football Association) Qadsia |
| 21 | MF | Ali Maqseed | 11 December 1986 (aged 25) | 16 | 0 | (Kuwait Football Association) Al-Arabi |
| 11 | MF | Fahad Al Ansari | 25 February 1987 (aged 25) | 23 | 1 | (Kuwait Football Association) Qadsia |
| 18 | MF | Jarah Al Ateeqi | 15 October 1981 (aged 30) | 68 | 3 | (Kuwait Football Association) Al Kuwait |
| 14 | MF | Talal Al-Amer | 22 February 1987 (aged 25) | 32 | 2 | (Kuwait Football Association) Qadsia |
| 4 | MF | Talal Nayef | 10 November 1985 (aged 26) | 16 | 0 | (Kuwait Football Association) Al-Arabi |
| 15 | MF | Waleed Ali | 3 November 1980 (aged 31) | 69 | 8 | (Kuwait Football Association) Al Kuwait |
| 17 | FW | Abdulhadi Khamis | 19 December 1990 (aged 21) | 0 | 0 | (Kuwait Football Association) Al Kuwait |
| 9 | FW | Fahad Al-Rashidi | 31 December 1984 (aged 27) | 14 | 6 | (Kuwait Football Association) Al-Arabi |
| 23 | FW | Hamad Al-Enezi | 5 October 1986 (aged 25) | 22 | 4 | (Kuwait Football Association) Qadsia |
| 20 | FW | Yousef Nasser | 9 October 1990 (aged 21) | 40 | 19 | (Kuwait Football Association) Kazma |
| 8 | FW | Mohammad Frieh | 24 November 1988 (aged 23) | 3 | 0 | (Kuwait Football Association) Al-Arabi |
| 7 | FW | Mohamed Dahash Al Shammari | 30 January 1989 (aged 23) | 1 | 0 | (Kuwait Football Association) Al-Jahra |
| 16 | FW | Talal Al Fadhel | 11 August 1990 (aged 21) | 1 | 0 | (Kuwait Football Association) Kazma |

=== Palestine ===
Coach: (Jordan) Jamal Mahmoud

| No. | Pos. | Player | Date of birth (age) | Caps | Goals | Club |
|---|---|---|---|---|---|---|
| | GK | Ramzi Saleh | 8 August 1980 (aged 31) | 49 | 0 | (Egyptian Football Association) Smouha Sporting Club |
| | GK | Toufic Ali | 8 November 1990 (aged 21) | 2 | 0 | (Palestinian Football Association) Tarji Wadi Al-Nes |
| | GK | Mohammed Shbair | 6 December 1986 (aged 25) | 12 | 0 | (Palestinian Football Association) Shabab Al-Khaleel |
| | DF | Abdelatif Bahdari | 20 February 1984 (aged 28) | 17 | 0 | (Saudi Arabian Football Federation) Hajer Club |
| | DF | Omar Jarun | 10 December 1983 (aged 28) | 7 | 0 | (Polish Football Association) Arka Gdynia |
| | DF | Alexis Norambuena | 31 March 1984 (aged 28) | 1 | 0 | (Polish Football Association) Jagiellonia Bialystok |
| | DF | Mousa Abu Jazar | 25 August 1987 (aged 24) | 10 | 0 | (Palestinian Football Association) Shabab Al-Khaleel |
| | DF | Nadim Barghouthi | 9 May 1989 (aged 23) | 7 | 0 | (Palestinian Football Association) Shabab Al-Khaleel |
| | DF | Abdesallam El-Sweikeri | 8 August 1984 (aged 27) | 3 | 0 | (Palestinian Football Association) Hilal Al-Quds |
| | DF | Rafat Ayad | 5 January 1986 (aged 26) | 5 | 0 | (Palestinian Football Association) Jabal Al-Mukaber |
| | DF | Raed Fares | 6 December 1982 (aged 29) | 8 | 0 | (Palestinian Football Association) Hilal Al-Quds |
| | MF | Roberto Kettlun | 25 July 1981 (aged 30) | 17 | 3 | (Italian Football Federation) Brindisi |
| | MF | Mohammed Samara | 1 January 1983 (aged 29) | 9 | 0 | (Egyptian Football Association) Misr El Makasa |
| | MF | Imad Zatara | 1 October 1984 (aged 27) | 11 | 1 | (Football Federation Islamic Republic of Iran) Sanat Naft |
| | MF | Abdelhamid Abuhabib | 6 August 1989 (aged 22) | 8 | 3 | (Palestinian Football Association) Shabab Al-Khaleel |
| | MF | Hussam Abu Saleh | 5 September 1982 (aged 29) | 17 | 1 | (Palestinian Football Association) Hilal Al-Quds |
| | MF | Ismail Amour | 2 October 1984 (aged 27) | 32 | 6 | (Palestinian Football Association) Markaz Shabab Al-Am'ari |
| | MF | Murad Ismail | 15 December 1982 (aged 29) | 11 | 0 | (Palestinian Football Association) Hilal Al-Quds |
| | MF | Ma'aly Kaware | 11 March 1983 (aged 29) | 16 | 0 | (Palestinian Football Association) Markaz Shabab Al-Am'ari |
| | MF | Houssam Wadi | 8 January 1986 (aged 26) | 20 | 2 | (Palestinian Football Association) Ittihad Shajeiyah |
| | MF | Khader Yousef | 10 June 1984 (aged 28) | 31 | 0 | (Palestinian Football Association) Tarji Wadi Al-Nes |
| | FW | Khaldoun Al-Halman | 19 August 1988 (aged 23) | 3 | 0 | (Palestinian Football Association) Ahli Al-Khaleel |
| | FW | Fahed Attal | 1 January 1985 (aged 27) | 35 | 15 | (Palestinian Football Association) Shabab Al-Khaleel |
| | FW | Ashraf Nu'man | 29 July 1986 (aged 25) | 21 | 4 | (Palestinian Football Association) Tarji Wadi Al-Nes |

== Group B ==
=== Libya ===
Coach: Abdul-Hafeedh Arbeesh

| No. | Pos. | Player | Date of birth (age) | Caps | Goals | Club |
|---|---|---|---|---|---|---|
| 1 | GK | Muhammad Nashnoush | 15 June 1988 (aged 24) | | | (Libyan Football Federation) Al-Ittihad |
| 12 | GK | Ahmed Al Ammari | 6 January 1977 (aged 35) | | | (Libyan Football Federation) Al-Ahly |
| 22 | GK | Ahmed Azzaqa | 9 August 1988 (aged 23) | | | (Libyan Football Federation) Al-Hilal |
| 2 | DF | Rabea Al-Laafi | 24 July 1991 (aged 20) | | | (Tunisian Football Federation) Club Africain |
| 3 | DF | Muhammad al Maghrabi | 19 April 1985 (aged 27) | | | (Royal Moroccan Football Federation) OC Khouribga |
| 4 | DF | Waled Al-Sbaai | 28 March 1983 (aged 29) | | | (Libyan Football Federation) Al-Ahli |
| 5 | DF | Younes Al-Shibani | 27 June 1981 (aged 30) | | | (Egyptian Football Association) Ismaily |
| 13 | DF | Abdulaziz Belraysh | 12 July 1992 (aged 19) | | | (Libyan Football Federation) Al-Ittihad |
| 14 | DF | Ali Salama | 18 September 1987 (aged 24) | | | (Tunisian Football Federation) Olympique Béja |
| 19 | DF | Hamed Snousi | 3 November 1989 (aged 22) | | | (Libyan Football Federation) Al-Ahly |
| 23 | DF | Ahmad Al Sagheer | 18 December 1987 (aged 24) | | | (Libyan Football Federation) Al-Akhdhar |
| 6 | MF | Mohammad Al-Sanany | 13 May 1984 (aged 28) | | | (Tunisian Football Federation) US Monastir |
| 8 | MF | Mohamed Hussein Qanaou | 1 December 1991 (aged 20) | | | (Libyan Football Federation) Al-Ittihad |
| 16 | MF | Abdulhakim Abdou | | | | (Libyan Football Federation) Al-Ittihad |
| 18 | MF | Faisal Al Badri | 4 June 1990 (aged 22) | | | (Libyan Football Federation) Al-Ahly |
| 21 | MF | Mahmoud Said Bheir | 1 January 1991 (aged 21) | | | (Libyan Football Federation) Al-Ahli |
| 24 | MF | Salem Ablo | 20 April 1991 (aged 21) | | | (Libyan Football Federation) Al-Ahli |
| 25 | MF | Marwan Mabrouk | 15 December 1989 (aged 22) | | | (Egyptian Football Association) El Dakhleya |
| 7 | FW | Moatez Al-Mahdi Husain | 9 August 1990 (aged 21) | | | (Libyan Football Federation) Al-Ahly |
| 9 | FW | Mohamed Al Ghanodi | 22 November 1992 (aged 19) | | | (Libyan Football Federation) Al-Ahli |
| 10 | FW | Ahmed Saad Osman | 7 August 1979 (aged 32) | | | (Tunisian Football Federation) Club Africain |
| 11 | FW | Idriss Al-Katani | | | | |
| 15 | FW | Mohammad Al-Ghouil | 31 December 1990 (aged 21) | | | (Libyan Football Federation) Asswehly |
| 17 | FW | Ihaab Boussefi | 23 June 1985 (aged 26) | | | (Tunisian Football Federation) CS Hammam-Lif |
| 20 | FW | Ayman Zayed | 4 October 1983 (aged 28) | | | (Football Federation Islamic Republic of Iran) Persepolis F.C. |

=== Morocco A' ===
Coach: (Belgium) Eric Gerets

| No. | Pos. | Player | Date of birth (age) | Caps | Goals | Club |
|---|---|---|---|---|---|---|
| 1 | GK | Issam Badda | 10 May 1983 (aged 29) | | | (Royal Moroccan Football Federation) FUS Rabat |
| 12 | GK | Aziz El Kinani | 30 August 1978 (aged 33) | | | (Royal Moroccan Football Federation) Moghreb Tetouan |
| 22 | GK | Khalid Askri | 20 March 1981 (aged 31) | | | (Royal Moroccan Football Federation) Raja Casablanca |
| 2 | DF | Rachid Soulaimani | 21 November 1982 (aged 29) | | | (Royal Moroccan Football Federation) Raja Casablanca |
| 3 | DF | Said Hammouni | 21 June 1981 (aged 31) | | | (Royal Moroccan Football Federation) Raja Casablanca |
| 4 | DF | Samir Zekroumi | 29 March 1985 (aged 27) | | | (Royal Moroccan Football Federation) MAS Fes |
| 5 | DF | Ismail Belmaalem | 9 April 1988 (aged 24) | | | (Royal Moroccan Football Federation) Raja Casablanca |
| 13 | DF | Zakaria Melhaoui | 18 July 1984 (aged 27) | | | (Royal Moroccan Football Federation) Moghreb Tetouan |
| 19 | DF | Ahmed Chagou | 27 November 1987 (aged 24) | | | (Royal Moroccan Football Federation) Difaâ El Jadidi |
| 21 | DF | Oussama El Gharib | 15 January 1987 (aged 25) | | | (Royal Moroccan Football Federation) FUS Rabat |
| 23 | DF | Mustapha Mrani | 2 March 1978 (aged 34) | | | (Royal Moroccan Football Federation) MAS Fes |
| 6 | MF | Ahmed Jahouh | 31 July 1988 (aged 23) | | | (Royal Moroccan Football Federation) Moghreb Tetouan |
| 8 | MF | Salaheddine Saidi | 6 February 1987 (aged 25) | | | (Royal Moroccan Football Federation) FAR Rabat |
| 15 | MF | Zaid Krouch | 27 January 1991 (aged 21) | | | (Royal Moroccan Football Federation) Moghreb Tetouan |
| 16 | MF | Soufiane Gadoum | 28 July 1988 (aged 23) | | | (Royal Moroccan Football Federation) Difaâ El Jadidi |
| 18 | MF | Ayoub Bourhim | 31 August 1990 (aged 21) | | | (Royal Moroccan Football Federation) Difaâ El Jadidi |
| 20 | MF | Abdessamad Rafik | 8 April 1982 (aged 30) | | | (Royal Moroccan Football Federation) Olympic Safi |
| 7 | FW | Yassine Salhi | 3 November 1987 (aged 24) | | | (Royal Moroccan Football Federation) Raja Casablanca |
| 9 | FW | Hamza Abourazzouk | 16 June 1986 (aged 26) | | | (Royal Moroccan Football Federation) MAS Fes |
| 10 | FW | Abdessalam Benjelloun | 28 January 1985 (aged 27) | | | (Royal Moroccan Football Federation) Wydad de Fès |
| 14 | FW | Brahim El Bahri | 26 March 1986 (aged 26) | | | (Royal Moroccan Football Federation) FUS Rabat |
| 11 | FW | Abdeladim Khadrouf | 3 January 1985 (aged 27) | | | (Royal Moroccan Football Federation) Moghreb Tetouan |
| 17 | FW | Abderrazak El Mnasfi | 5 March 1982 (aged 30) | | | (Royal Moroccan Football Federation) Moghreb Tetouan |

=== Bahrain ===
Coach: (England) Peter Taylor

| No. | Pos. | Player | Date of birth (age) | Caps | Goals | Club |
|---|---|---|---|---|---|---|
| 1 | GK | Sayed Mohammed Jaffer | 25 August 1985 (aged 26) | 55 | 0 | (Bahrain Football Association) Al-Muharraq |
| 21 | GK | Abbas Ahmed Khamis | 13 June 1983 (aged 29) | 20 | 0 | (Bahrain Football Association) Al-Ahli |
| 22 | GK | Abdulla Al-Kaabi | 16 November 1988 (aged 23) | 3 | 0 | (Bahrain Football Association) Al-Muharraq |
| 2 | DF | Rashed Al-Hooti | 24 December 1989 (aged 22) | 19 | 0 | (Bahrain Football Association) East Riffa |
| 3 | DF | Abdulla Al-Marzooqi | 12 December 1980 (aged 31) | 87 | 9 | (Bahrain Football Association) Al-Riffa |
| 5 | DF | Saleh Abdulhamid Mahmeedi | 4 August 1982 (aged 29) | 17 | 0 | (Bahrain Football Association) Al-Najma |
| 6 | DF | Dawood Saad | 9 July 1986 (aged 25) | 13 | 0 | (Bahrain Football Association) Al-Riffa |
| 16 | DF | Waleed Al-Hayam | 4 November 1988 (aged 23) | 5 | 0 | (Bahrain Football Association) Al-Muharraq |
| 17 | DF | Hussain Ali Baba | 11 February 1982 (aged 30) | 75 | 3 | (Kuwait Football Association) Kuwait SC |
| 19 | DF | Mohamed Duaij Mahorfi | 24 July 1981 (aged 30) | 5 | 0 | (Bahrain Football Association) Al-Riffa |
| 23 | DF | Ebrahim Al-Obaidli | 6 March 1986 (aged 26) | 5 | 0 | (Bahrain Football Association) Al-Busaiteen |
| 4 | MF | Sayed Dhiya | 17 July 1992 (aged 19) | 6 | 4 | (Bahrain Football Association) Al-Muharraq |
| 7 | MF | Mohamed Abdulwahab | 13 November 1989 (aged 22) | 0 | 0 | (Bahrain Football Association) Al-Riffa |
| 9 | MF | Abdulwahab Al-Malood | 7 June 1990 (aged 22) | 4 | 0 | (Bahrain Football Association) Al-Hidd |
| 10 | MF | Mahmood Al-Ajmi | 8 May 1987 (aged 25) | 3 | 0 | (Bahrain Football Association) Manama |
| 12 | MF | Fahad Yousif Al-Hardan | 14 January 1987 (aged 25) | 6 | 1 | (Bahrain Football Association) Al-Muharraq |
| 13 | MF | Issa Ali | | | | (Bahrain Football Association) |
| 14 | MF | Salman Isa (C) | 12 July 1977 (aged 34) | 115 | 22 | (Bahrain Football Association) Al-Riffa |
| 15 | MF | Abdullah Omar | 1 January 1987 (aged 25) | 55 | 3 | (Saudi Arabian Football Federation) Al-Ittihad Jeddah |
| 18 | MF | Abdulwahab Al-Safi | 6 April 1984 (aged 28) | 19 | 0 | (Saudi Arabian Football Federation) Al-Qadisiyah |
| 8 | FW | Ismaeel Abdullatif | 11 September 1986 (aged 25) | 58 | 29 | (Bahrain Football Association) Al-Muharraq |
| 11 | FW | Ahmed Mubarak Al-Khattal | 6 October 1988 (aged 23) | 2 | 0 | (Bahrain Football Association) Al-Hala |
| 20 | FW | Sami Al-Husaini | 29 September 1989 (aged 22) | 7 | 3 | (Bahrain Football Association) Al-Busaiteen |
| | FW | Sayed Hashem Isa | 11 August 1985 (aged 26) | 7 | 0 | (Bahrain Football Association) Malkiya |

=== Yemen ===
Coach: Sami Hasan Al Nash

| No. | Pos. | Player | Date of birth (age) | Caps | Goals | Club |
|---|---|---|---|---|---|---|
| 19 | GK | Salem Saeed (Captain) | 1 January 1984 (aged 28) | | | (Yemen Football Association) Al-Hilal Al-Sahili |
| 1 | GK | Jaem Nasser | 1 January 1983 (aged 29) | | | (Yemen Football Association) Al Saqr |
| 22 | GK | Saoud Al Sawedi | 10 April 1988 (aged 24) | | | (Yemen Football Association) Al-Wahda (Aden) |
| 2 | DF | Mudeer Abdurboh | 1 January 1990 (aged 22) | | | (Yemen Football Association) Al-Ahli Sana'a |
| 3 | DF | Nateq Hezam | 1 January 1990 (aged 22) | | | (Yemen Football Association) Al-Shaab Ibb |
| 4 | DF | Ahmed Al Sadiq | 1 January 1983 (aged 29) | | | (Yemen Football Association) Al-Shula |
| 5 | DF | Zaher Mohammed Farid | 6 July 1986 (aged 25) | | | (Yemen Football Association) Al-Wahda (Aden) |
| 6 | DF | Abdullaziz Al Guma`i | 1 January 1990 (aged 22) | | | (Yemen Football Association) Al-Ahli Sana'a |
| 16 | DF | Khaled Baleid | 2 November 1986 (aged 25) | | | (Yemen Football Association) Al-Tilal |
| 21 | DF | Mohammed Msaad | 1 January 1983 (aged 29) | | | (Yemen Football Association) Al-Oruba |
| 7 | MF | Haitham Thabit | 6 February 1986 (aged 26) | | | (Yemen Football Association) Al-Oruba |
| 9 | MF | Ala Al-Sasi | 7 February 1987 (aged 25) | | | (Yemen Football Association) Al-Ahli Sana'a |
| 11 | MF | Munassar Ba Haj | 1 January 1990 (aged 22) | | | (Yemen Football Association) Al-Hilal Al-Sahili |
| 14 | MF | Mohammed Baroies | 1 January 1986 (aged 26) | | | (Yemen Football Association) Al-Wahda (Aden) |
| 15 | MF | Akram Al-Worafi | 12 November 1986 (aged 25) | | | (Yemen Football Association) Al-Shaab Ibb |
| 23 | MF | Mohammed Al Abidi | 1 January 1986 (aged 26) | | | (Yemen Football Association) Shabab Al Baydaa |
| 20 | MF | Hussein Ghazi | 1 January 1989 (aged 23) | | | (Yemen Football Association) Al-Oruba |
| 12 | MF | Muaadh Hazza'a | 1 January 1986 (aged 26) | | | (Yemen Football Association) Al-Wahda (Aden) |
| 8 | FW | Wahid Al Khyat | 1 January 1985 (aged 27) | | | (Yemen Football Association) Al-Ahli Sana'a |
| 10 | FW | Ayman Al-Hagri | 1 January 1992 (aged 20) | | | (Yemen Football Association) Al-Shaab Ibb |
| 13 | FW | Akram Al-Selwi | 8 September 1986 (aged 25) | | | (Yemen Football Association) Al-Hilal |
| 17 | FW | Kameel Tareq Mohamed | 1 January 1986 (aged 26) | | | (Yemen Football Association) Al-Shula |
| 18 | FW | Tamer Hanash | 3 January 1986 (aged 26) | | | (Yemen Football Association) Al-Ahli Sana'a |

== Group C ==
=== Egypt U23 ===
Coach: (Egypt) Hany Ramzy

| No. | Pos. | Player | Date of birth (age) | Caps | Goals | Club |
|---|---|---|---|---|---|---|
| 1 | GK | Ali Lotfi | 14 October 1989 (aged 22) | 1 | 0 | (Egyptian Football Association) ENPPI |
| 16 | GK | Ahmed El Shenawy | 29 January 1991 (aged 21) | 7 | 0 | (Egyptian Football Association) Zamalek |
| 23 | GK | Mohamed Bassam | 25 December 1990 (aged 21) | 0 | 0 | (Egyptian Football Association) Tala'ea El-Gaish |
| 2 | DF | Salah Soliman | 20 January 1990 (aged 22) | 0 | 0 | (Egyptian Football Association) Zamalek |
| 3 | DF | Ali Fathy | 2 January 1992 (aged 20) | 3 | 0 | (Egyptian Football Association) Al-Moqawloon El-Arab |
| 5 | DF | Mahmoud Alaa | 1 January 1991 (aged 21) | 1 | 0 | (Egyptian Football Association) Haras El Hodood |
| 6 | DF | Ahmed Hegazi | 25 January 1991 (aged 21) | 10 | 0 | (Italian Football Federation) Fiorentina |
| 12 | DF | Islam Ramadan | 1 November 1990 (aged 21) | 2 | 0 | (Egyptian Football Association) Haras El Hodood |
| 15 | DF | Saad Samir | 1 April 1989 (aged 23) | 2 | 0 | (Egyptian Football Association) Al Ahly |
| 21 | DF | Ahmed Sobhi | 1 January 1993 (aged 19) | 0 | 0 | (Egyptian Football Association) ENPPI |
| 4 | MF | Hesham Mohamed | 3 January 1989 (aged 23) | 1 | 0 | (Egyptian Football Association) Al Ahly |
| 7 | MF | Saleh Gomaa | 1 August 1993 (aged 18) | 1 | 0 | (Egyptian Football Association) ENPPI |
| 8 | MF | Shehab El-Din Ahmed | 22 August 1990 (aged 21) | 1 | 0 | (Egyptian Football Association) Al Ahly |
| 10 | MF | Mohamed Ibrahim | 1 March 1992 (aged 20) | 0 | 0 | (Egyptian Football Association) Zamalek |
| 11 | MF | Ahmed Eid Abdel Malek | 15 May 1980 (aged 32) | 44 | 6 | (Egyptian Football Association) Haras El Hodood |
| 14 | MF | Hossam Hassan | 30 April 1989 (aged 23) | 3 | 0 | (Egyptian Football Association) Al Masry |
| 17 | MF | Mohamed El-Nenny | 12 July 1992 (aged 20) | 13 | 0 | (Egyptian Football Association) Al-Moqawloon |
| 20 | MF | Mohamed Ghazy | 12 November 1992 (aged 19) | 1 | 0 | (Egyptian Football Association) ENPPI |
| 24 | MF | Ahmed Hamoudi | 24 December 1990 (aged 21) | 0 | 0 | (Egyptian Football Association) Smouha |
| 9 | FW | Marwan Mohsen | 26 February 1989 (aged 23) | 3 | 3 | (Egyptian Football Association) Petrojet |
| 13 | FW | Ahmed Shroyda | 21 October 1990 (aged 21) | 1 | 0 | (Egyptian Football Association) Al Masry |
| 18 | FW | Ahmed Magdi | 9 December 1989 (aged 22) | 0 | 0 | (Egyptian Football Association) Ghazl El-Mehalla |
| 19 | FW | Amr Zaki | 1 April 1983 (aged 29) | 58 | 29 | (Egyptian Football Association) Zamalek |
| 22 | FW | Mohamed Salah | 15 June 1992 (aged 20) | 13 | 8 | (Swiss Football Association) FC Basel |

=== Iraq ===
Coach: (Brazil) Zico

| No. | Pos. | Player | Date of birth (age) | Caps | Goals | Club |
|---|---|---|---|---|---|---|
| 1 | GK | Mohammed Hameed | 24 January 1993 (aged 19) | 0 | 0 | (Iraq Football Association) Al-Shorta |
| 2 | DF | Ahmad Ibrahim | 25 February 1992 (aged 20) | 10 | 0 | (Iraq Football Association) Arbil |
| 3 | DF | Bassim Abbas (Vice-captain) | 1 July 1982 (aged 29) | 87 | 3 | (Iraq Football Association) Baghdad |
| 4 | MF | Qusay Munir | 12 April 1981 (aged 31) | 82 | 6 | (Iraq Football Association) Baghdad |
| 5 | MF | Ibrahim Kamil | 9 September 1988 (aged 23) | 4 | 0 | (Iraq Football Association) Al-Quwa Al-Jawiya |
| 6 | MF | Fareed Majeed | 10 April 1986 (aged 26) | 13 | 0 | (Iraq Football Association) Al-Shorta |
| 7 | FW | Ali Salah | 2 November 1987 (aged 24) | 4 | 0 | Free agent |
| 8 | FW | Hammadi Ahmad | 18 October 1989 (aged 22) | 3 | 0 | (Iraq Football Association) Al-Quwa Al-Jawiya |
| 9 | FW | Mustafa Karim | 21 July 1987 (aged 24) | 40 | 5 | (Egyptian Football Association) El-Ittihad El-Iskandary |
| 10 | FW | Luay Salah | 7 February 1982 (aged 30) | 22 | 4 | (Iraq Football Association) Erbil |
| 11 | MF | Abbas Rehema | 1 July 1989 (aged 22) | 1 | 0 | (Iraq Football Association) Najaf |
| 12 | GK | Mohammed Gassid | 10 December 1986 (aged 25) | 54 | 0 | (Iraq Football Association) Al-Talaba |
| 13 | MF | Karrar Jassim | 11 June 1987 (aged 25) | 49 | 6 | (United Arab Emirates Football Association) Ajman |
| 14 | DF | Salam Shaker (Captain) | 31 July 1986 (aged 25) | 48 | 2 | (Qatar Football Association) Al-Khor |
| 15 | DF | Waleed Bahar | 27 April 1991 (aged 21) | 4 | 0 | (Iraq Football Association) Al-Shorta |
| 16 | DF | Samal Saeed | 7 January 1986 (aged 26) | 50 | 2 | Free agent |
| 17 | FW | Alaa Abdul-Zahra | 22 December 1987 (aged 24) | 38 | 8 | (Qatar Football Association) Qatar SC |
| 18 | MF | Mahdi Karim | 10 December 1983 (aged 28) | 92 | 12 | (Iraq Football Association) Erbil |
| 19 | DF | Hussam Kadhim | 17 October 1987 (aged 24) | 6 | 0 | (Iraq Football Association) Al-Quwa Al-Jawiya |
| 20 | MF | Muthana Khalid | 14 June 1989 (aged 23) | 26 | 0 | (Iraq Football Association) Al-Quwa Al-Jawiya |
| 21 | DF | Ali Bahjat | 3 March 1992 (aged 20) | 0 | 0 | (Iraq Football Association) Duhok |
| 22 | GK | Noor Sabri | 18 June 1984 (aged 28) | 63 | 0 | (Iraq Football Association) Najaf |
| 23 | MF | Ahmed Yasin | 22 April 1991 (aged 21) | 0 | 0 | (Swedish Football Association) Örebro SK |

=== Lebanon ===
Coach: (Germany) Theo Bücker

| No. | Pos. | Player | Date of birth (age) | Caps | Goals | Club |
|---|---|---|---|---|---|---|
| | GK | Ziad Al-Samad | 6 August 1978 (aged 33) | | | (Lebanese Football Association) Al-Safa |
| | GK | Mohammed Hamoud | 20 April 1980 (aged 32) | | | (Lebanese Football Association) Safa |
| | GK | Hassan Moghnieh | 7 February 1986 (aged 26) | | | (Lebanese Football Association) Al-Ansar |
| | DF | Ali Hamam | 25 August 1986 (aged 25) | | | (Lebanese Football Association) Al-Nejmeh |
| | DF | Abbas Kenaan | 25 November 1982 (aged 29) | | | (Lebanese Football Association) Al-Ahed |
| | DF | Ali Al Saadi | 20 April 1986 (aged 26) | | | (Lebanese Football Association) Al-Safa |
| | DF | Walid Ismail | 10 November 1984 (aged 27) | | | (Lebanese Football Association) Racing Beirut |
| | DF | Mootaz El Jounaidi | 26 September 1986 (aged 25) | | | (Lebanese Football Association) Al-Ansar |
| | MF | Abbas Ahmed Atwi | 12 September 1979 (aged 32) | | | (Lebanese Football Association) Al-Nejmeh |
| | MF | Haytham Faour | 27 February 1990 (aged 22) | | | (Lebanese Football Association) Al-Ahed |
| | MF | Hussein Dakik | 10 November 1988 (aged 23) | | | (Lebanese Football Association) Al-Ahed |
| | MF | Rabih Ataya | 16 July 1989 (aged 22) | | | (Lebanese Football Association) Al-Ansar |
| | MF | Nader Matar | 12 May 1992 (aged 20) | | | (Royal Spanish Football Federation) Canillas |
| | MF | Amer Khan | 4 June 1983 (aged 29) | | | (Lebanese Football Association) Al-Safa |
| | MF | Mohamed Shamas | 25 February 1987 (aged 25) | | | (Lebanese Football Association) Al-Nejmeh |
| | FW | Ahmad Zreik | 27 October 1990 (aged 21) | | | (Lebanese Football Association) Al-Ahed |
| | FW | Hassan Maatouk | 10 August 1987 (aged 24) | | | (United Arab Emirates Football Association) Emirates Club |
| | FW | Hassan Al Mohamed | 24 August 1988 (aged 23) | | | (Lebanese Football Association) Al-Nejmeh |
| | FW | Akram Moghrabi | 19 October 1985 (aged 26) | | | (Lebanese Football Association) Al-Nejmeh |
| | FW | Hassan Chaito | 20 March 1989 (aged 23) | | | (Lebanese Football Association) Al-Ahed |

=== Sudan ===
Coach: Mohamed Abdallah

| No. | Pos. | Player | Date of birth (age) | Caps | Goals | Club |
|---|---|---|---|---|---|---|
| 1 | GK | Ehab Zoghbair | 15 March 1983 (aged 29) | | | (Sudan Football Association) Al-Merrikh SC |
| 16 | GK | El Muez Mahgoub | 14 August 1978 (aged 33) | | | (Sudan Football Association) Al-Hilal Club |
| 21 | GK | Mohammed Adam | 1 February 1984 (aged 28) | | | (Sudan Football Association) Al-Jabal Merowe |
| 2 | DF | Al-Taher Al-Haj | 5 October 1989 (aged 22) | | | (Sudan Football Association) Al-Merreikh SC |
| 19 | DF | Sami Abdullah | 17 February 1987 (aged 25) | | | (Sudan Football Association) Alamal SC Atbara |
| 4 | DF | Motasim El Manaqil | | | | (Sudan Football Association) Al Neel SC (Al-Hasahisa) |
| 13 | DF | Amer Adil | 19 December 1989 (aged 22) | | | (Sudan Football Association) Al Ahli SC (Khartoum) |
| 5 | DF | Moawya El Amin | 17 October 1988 (aged 23) | | | (Sudan Football Association) Al Neel SC (Al-Hasahisa) |
| 3 | DF | Mowaia Bashir | 17 April 1986 (aged 26) | | | (Sudan Football Association) Al-Hilal Club |
| 14 | DF | Alsadig Srir | | | | (Sudan Football Association) Hilal Alsahil SC |
| 8 | MF | Ahmed Martin Idris | 5 March 1988 (aged 24) | | | (Sudan Football Association) Hay Al-Arab SC |
| 12 | MF | Bader Eldin Abdalla Galag | 1 April 1981 (aged 31) | | | (Sudan Football Association) Hilal Alsahil SC |
| 20 | MF | Mohamed Hassan Eltayeb | 9 October 1981 (aged 30) | | | (Sudan Football Association) Al Khartoum SC |
| 9 | MF | Mohammed Musa | 7 August 1990 (aged 21) | | | (Sudan Football Association) Al Khartoum SC |
| 23 | MF | Mortada Kabir | 14 May 1985 (aged 27) | | | (Sudan Football Association) Al-Hilal SC Kadougli |
| 22 | FW | Mohamed Ahmed Bashir | 23 May 1983 (aged 29) | | | (Saudi Arabian Football Federation) Al-Wehda |
| 6 | FW | Ramadan Agab | 20 February 1986 (aged 26) | | | (Sudan Football Association) Al-Merrikh SC |
| 17 | FW | Nasr Eddin Musa | 5 April 1989 (aged 23) | | | (Sudan Football Association) Al Ahli SC (Khartoum) |
| 11 | FW | Mohamed Abd Al Momen Ankba | 1 July 1990 (aged 21) | | | (Sudan Football Association) Al Khartoum SC |
| 7 | FW | Ahmed Adil | 1 December 1985 (aged 26) | | | (Sudan Football Association) Al-Mourada SC |
| 18 | FW | Amin Ibrahim | 17 January 1986 (aged 26) | | | (Sudan Football Association) Al Khartoum SC |
| 15 | FW | Osama El-Ta'aysha | 29 February 1988 (aged 24) | | | (Sudan Football Association) Al Neel SC (Al-Hasahisa) |

1 January 1980 (aged 32)
