= 2012 Arab Cup final =

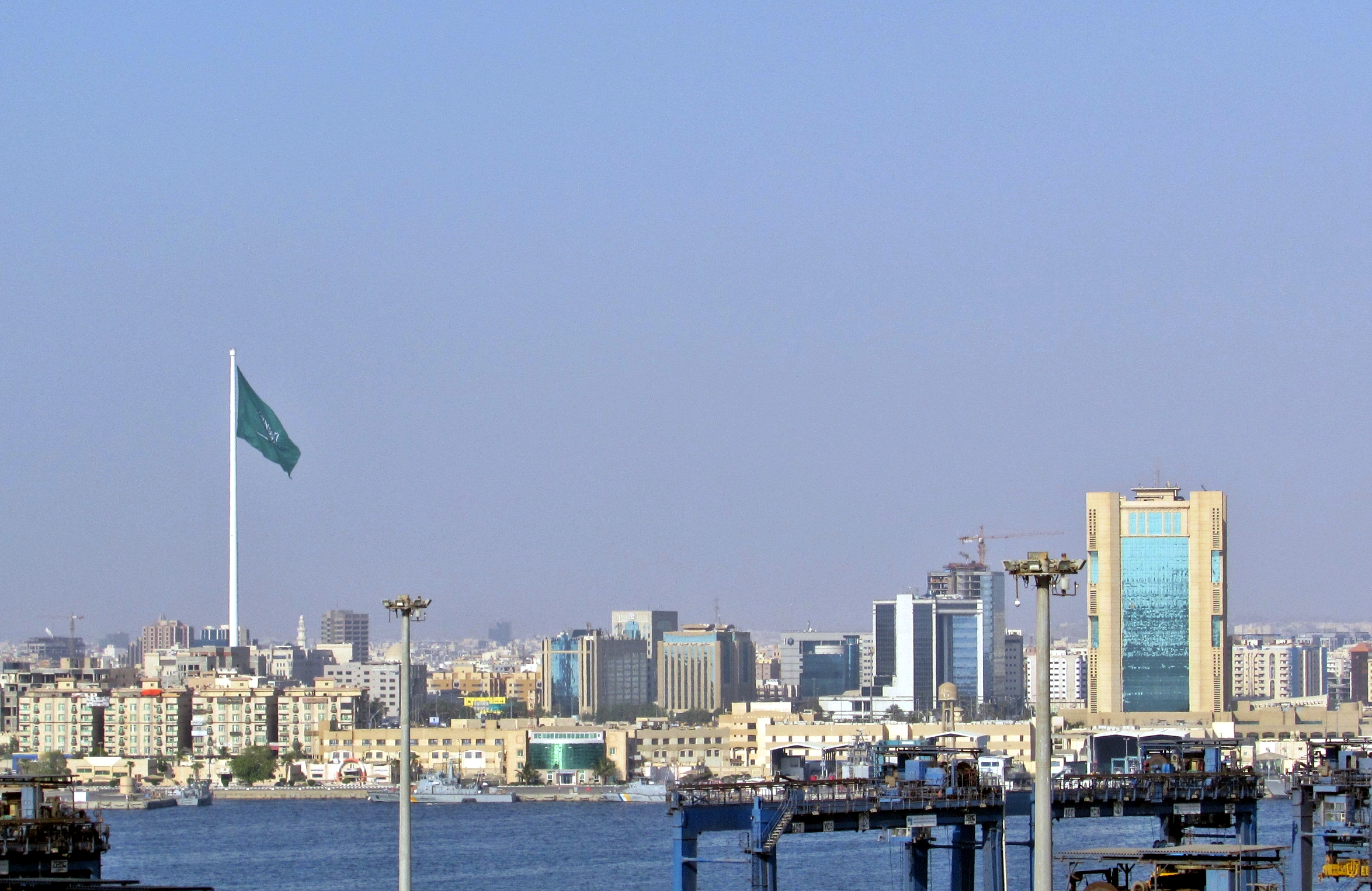
- Jeddah hosts the final tournament
- Event: 2012 Arab Cup
Libya	Morocco A'
(Libya)	(Morocco)
1	1
- Morocco won 3–1 on penalties
- Date: 6 July 2012
- Venue: Prince Abdullah al-Faisal Stadium, Jeddah
- Referee: Selim Jedidi (Tunisia)

The 2012 Arab Cup final was a football match that took place on 6 July 2012, at the Prince Abdullah al-Faisal Stadium in Jeddah, Saudi Arabia, to determine the winner of the 2012 Arab Cup. Morocco with the local A' team defeated Libya 3–1 on penalties after 1–1 on extra time to win their first Arab Cup.

== Road to the final ==
Libya
Round
Morocco A'
Opponents
Result
Group stage
Opponents
Result
Yemen
3–1
Match 1
Bahrain
4–0
Morocco A'
0–0
Match 2
Libya
0–0
Bahrain
2–1
Match 3
Yemen
4–0

Team	Pld	W	D	L	GF	GA	GD	Pts
Morocco A'	3	2	1	0	8	0	+8	7
Libya	3	2	1	0	5	2	+3	7
Yemen	3	1	0	2	3	7	−4	3
Bahrain	3	0	0	3	1	8	−7	3

Final standings

Team	Pld	W	D	L	GF	GA	GD	Pts
Morocco A'	3	2	1	0	8	0	+8	7
Libya	3	2	1	0	5	2	+3	7
Yemen	3	1	0	2	3	7	−4	3
Bahrain	3	0	0	3	1	8	−7	3

Opponents
Result
Knockout stage
Opponents
Result
Saudi Arabia
2–0
Semi-finals
Iraq
2–1

== Match ==
=== Details ===
6 July 2012
21:00

Libya	1–1 (a.e.t.)	Morocco A'
Al Badri 89'		El Bahri 5'
Penalties
Al Badri (penalty scored); Salama (penalty missed); Al-Sbaai (penalty missed); Al Ghanodi (penalty missed)	1–3	(penalty scored) Salhi; (penalty scored) Jahouh; (penalty missed) Abdessamad; (penalty missed) Gadoum; (penalty scored) Belmaalem

Prince Abdullah al-Faisal Stadium
Attendance: 2,500
Referee: Selim Jedidi (Tunisia)

Libya	Morocco A'

Libya:
GK	1	Muhammad Nashnoush	Booked
DF	3	Muhammad Al Maghrabi		(substituted off) 77'
DF	4	Waled Jalal Al-Sbaai	(yellow card) 68'
DF	5	Younes Al-Shibani
DF	14	Ali Salama
DF	24	Abdulaziz Belraysh	(yellow card) 28'	Substituted off
MF	6	Mohamed Esnany	(yellow card) 16'
MF	10	Ahmed Saad Osman (c)	(yellow card) 117'
MF	18	Faisal Al Badri
MF	21	Mahmoud Said Bheir		(substituted off) 46'
FW	17	Ihaab Boussefi
Substitutes:
DF	13	Salem Ablo	(yellow card) 119'	(substituted on) 77'
DF	19	Hamed Snousi	(yellow card) 76'	Substituted on
FW	9	Mohamed Al Ghanodi		(substituted on) 46'
Manager:
(Libya) Abdul-Hafeedh Arbeesh

Morocco A':
GK	12	Aziz El Kinani
DF	2	Rachid Soulaimani	(yellow card) 65'
DF	5	Ismail Belmaalem	(yellow card) 76'
DF	21	Oussama El Gharib
DF	23	Mustapha Mrani (c)	Booked
MF	6	Ahmed Jahouh
MF	8	Salaheddine Saidi
MF	10	Abdessalam Benjelloun		(substituted off) 59'
FW	7	Yassine Salhi
FW	14	Brahim El Bahri		(substituted off) 90'
FW	17	Abderrazak El Mnasfi		(substituted off) 82'
Substitutes:
MF	16	Soufiane Gadoum		(substituted on) 59'
MF	20	Abdessamad Rafik		(substituted on) 90'
FW	11	Abdeladim Khadrouf		(substituted on) 82'
Manager:
(Belgium) Eric Gerets

Assistant referees:
Béchir Hassani (Tunisia)
Sherif Salah (Egypt)
Fourth official:
Djamel Haimoudi (Algeria)

Man of the Match:
TBD (...)
