= Morocco at the FIFA Arab Cup =

International football delegation

Morocco has participated five times in the FIFA Arab Cup, the biggest men's football event in the Arab world. Morocco made its debut in the 1998 Arab Cup, the 7th edition of the Arab Cup, and since then has managed to win the title two times. Its first victory came in 2012, when the tournament was organized by the UAFA, and the second in 2025, organized by FIFA.

== Overall Record ==
FIFA Arab Cup
Year	Round	Position	Pld	W	D	L	GF	GA
(Lebanon) 1963	Did not participate							
(Kuwait) 1964	Did not participate							
(Iraq) 1966	Did not participate							
(Saudi Arabia) 1985	Did not participate							
(Jordan) 1988	Did not participate							
(Syria) 1992	Did not participate							
(Qatar) 1998	Group stage	5th	2	1	0	1	2	2
(Kuwait) 2002	Semi-finals	3rd	5	1	2	2	5	6
2009	Cancelled							
(Saudi Arabia) 2012	Champions	1st	5	4	1	0	11	2
(Qatar) 2021	Quarter-finals	5th	4	3	1	0	11	2
(Qatar) 2025	Champions	1st	6	5	1	0	11	3
(Qatar) 2029	To be determined							
(Qatar) 2033	To be determined							
Total	2 Titles	5/11	22	13	6	3	40	15

== List of matches ==
FIFA Arab Cup	Round	Date	Opponent	Score	Result	Morocco scorers	Ref.
(Qatar) 1998	Group C	23 September 1998	United Arab Emirates	1–0	W	Termina	
(Qatar) 1998	Group C	25 September 1998	Sudan	1–2	L	Tarik Sektioui	
(Qatar) 2002	Group A	16 December 2002	Kuwait	1–1	D	El Moubarki	
(Qatar) 2002	Group A	18 December 2002	Jordan	1–1	D	Yazid Kaïssi	
(Qatar) 2002	Group A	20 December 2002	Palestine	3–1	D	Mohamed Armoumen (2), Saïd Kherrazi	
(Qatar) 2002	Group A	25 December 2002	Sudan	0–1	L	—	
(Qatar) 2002	Semi-finals	28 December 2002	Saudi Arabia	0–2	L	—	
(Saudi Arabia) 2012	Group B	23 June 2012	Bahrain	4–0	W	El Bahri, Yassine Salhi, Al Hayam (o.g), Benjelloun	
(Saudi Arabia) 2012	Group B	26 June 2012	Libya	0–0	D	—	
(Saudi Arabia) 2012	Group B	29 June 2012	Yemen	4–0	W	Yassine Salhi (4)	
(Saudi Arabia) 2012	Semi-finals	3 July 2012	Iraq	2–1	W	El Gharib, Yassine Salhi	
(Saudi Arabia) 2012	Final	6 July 2012	Libya	1–1	D	Brahim El Bahri	
(Qatar) 2021	Group C	1 December 2021	Palestine	4–0	W	Nahiri, Hafidi (2), Benoun (p)	
(Qatar) 2021	Group C	4 December 2021	Jordan	4–0	W	Jabrane, Benoun, Chibi, Rahimi (p)	
(Qatar) 2021	Group C	7 December 2021	Saudi Arabia	1–0	W	El Berkaoui (p)	
(Qatar) 2021	Quarter-finals	11 December 2021	Algeria	2–2	D	Nahiri, Benoun	
(Qatar) 2025	Group B	2 December 2025	Comoros	3–1	W	Bouftini, Tissoudali, El Berkaoui	
(Qatar) 2025	Group B	5 December 2025	Oman	0–0	D	—	
(Qatar) 2025	Group B	8 December 2025	Saudi Arabia	1–0	W	El Berkaoui	
(Qatar) 2025	Quarter-finals	11 December 2025	Syria	1–0	W	Azaro	
(Qatar) 2025	Semi-finals	15 December 2025	United Arab Emirates	3–0	W	El Berkaoui, El Mahdioui, Hamdallah	
(Qatar) 2025	Final	18 December 2025	Jordan	3–2	W	Tannane, Hamdallah (2)	

== Awards ==
FIFA Arab Cup Best player
- 2012: Yassine Salhi
- 2025: Mohamed Rabie Hrimat
FIFA Arab Cup Top scorer
- 2012: Yassine Salhi
FIFA Arab Cup Best goalkeeper
- 2025: Mehdi Benabid

== See also ==
- Morocco at the FIFA World Cup
- Morocco at the Africa Cup of Nations
