= Morocco A' national football team =

National team for in-Morocco players in The World Cup

Morocco local football team
- Nickname(s): أُسُودُ الأَطلَس (The Atlas Lions)
- Association: Royal Moroccan Football Federation (FRMF)
- Confederation: CAF (Africa)
- Sub-confederation: UNAF (North Africa)
- Head coach: Tarik Sektioui
- Captain: Mohamed Rabie Hrimat
- Most caps: Abdelilah Hafidi (25)
- Top scorer: Ayoub El Kaabi (14)
- Home stadium: Various
- FIFA code: MAR
| First colours | Second colours |

African Nations Championship
- Appearances: 5 (first in 2014)
- Best result: Champions (2018, 2020, 2024)

The Morocco A' national football team (Arabic: منتخب المغرب لكرة القدم للمحليين) is the local national football team of Morocco and is open only to domestic league players. They have won the African Nations Championship a record three times (2018, 2020 and 2024).

The primary men's Morocco national football team contains expatriate players and represents Morocco at the Africa Cup of Nations.

== History ==
=== 2009-2011: Difficult debut ===
The Local Atlas Lions entered the qualifiers for the first ever African Nations Championship (CHAN) edition hosted by Ivory Coast in 2009. With a zonal format for the qualifiers, the team coached by Abdellah Blinda defeated Algeria in the first round on penalties after both games ended with a 1-1 draw. In the final round, going into the second leg with a 3-1 lead, the Moroccans surprisingly lost to Libya 3-0 and were eliminated.

The second edition hosted by Sudan in 2011 saw the number of participating teams at the final tournament increase to 16. This meant that the North African zone received an additional spot for the finals. In the single qualifying round, Morocco under the management of Mustafa El Haddaoui secured a 1-1 draw away to Tunisia. The reverse fixture played at Casablanca's Stade Mohammed V saw the Atlas Lions' lead at the 31st minute by Amin Erbati cancelled in the last 15 minutes of the game through Saber Khalifa and Yassine Meriah in the 75th and 83rd minutes respectively. Rachid Soulaimani nonetheless equalized at the 85th minute but could not prevent the Atlas Lions from missing out for the second consecutive time. Tunisia eventually went on to win the tournament, defeating Angola in the final.

=== 2012: First Arab Cup title ===
Morocco took part in the 2012 Arab Cup hosted by Saudi Arabia. The team kicked off their campaign with a convincing 4-0 win to Bahrain, followed by a goalless draw to Libya and another 4-0 win against Yemen in a match that notably saw Yassine Salhi scoring a super hattrick to top their group with 7 points and a superior goal difference. In the semi-final, the Moroccans beat four time champions Iraq 2-1 in regular time.

The final hosted at the Prince Abdullah al-Faisal Stadium in Jeddah saw Morocco taking on Libya in a rematch of their group stage game. The Atlas Lions went ahead after just five minutes thanks to a goal scored by Brahim El Bahri. However, Faisal Al Badri equalized in the 89th minute to force the game to extra time. With the scoreline unchanged, Morocco eventually won 3-1 on penalties to claim their first Arab Cup title. Yassine Salhi was named player of the tournament, and was also the top scorer with a total of 6 goals. Additionally, it was the first and only title won by Eric Gerets at the helm of the team.

=== 2014-2016: African Nations Championship debut and early exit ===
Following the dismissal of Eric Gerets in September 2012, Rachid Taoussi took over as head coach. The 2014 African Nations Championship qualifiers pitted Morocco against Tunisia for the second time in a row. This time, the Moroccans secured a vital 1-0 win in Sousse courtesy of a late goal by Abdessamad El Mobarky in the 89th minute. The second leg played at the Stade de Tanger ended in a goalless draw which was enough for the Moroccans to make their debut at the CHAN final tournament with a 1-0 win on aggregate, knocking out the title holders in the process.

Prior to the start of the tournament in South Africa, Hassan Benabicha replaced Rachid Taoussi whose contract was not renewed in a caretaking capacity. The draw placed Morocco in Group B alongside Burkina Faso, Zimbabwe and Uganda. The North Africans started their campaign with a 0-0 draw against Zimbabwe, followed by a 1-1 draw against Burkina Faso. The game also witnessed Brahim El Bahri becoming the first ever Moroccan player to score a goal at the CHAN finals, and also one of the fastest goals scored at the tournament (in the first minute). In the last game, Morocco defeated Uganda 3-1 at the Cape Town Stadium to ensure qualification to the second round, after topping their group with 5 points and a favourable goal difference.

In the quarter-finals, Mohsine Moutouali (in the 33rd and 40th minutes) and Mouhcine Iajour (in the 37th minute) scored to give Morocco a 3–0 lead at half time. However, the Atlas Lions fell surprisingly in the second half, allowing Nigeria to equalize towards the end by Ejike Uzoenyi and take the game to extra time. Benefitting from a goalkeeper error with eight minutes remaining, Christian Pyagbara scored to make it 3-4 and complete Nigeria's comeback.

In 2016, it was Mohamed Fakhir, who led the team to qualify for their second consecutive CHAN, topping their qualifying group with 10 points from four games and finishing ahead of Tunisia and Libya. In the final tournament which took place in Rwanda, the Atlas Lions could only manage a 0-0 draw to Gabon followed by a 0-1 loss to Ivory Coast leaving the North African side on the brink of elimination. The team's final match, a resounding 4–1 win against host country Rwanda, could not prevent the Moroccans' elimination; as the Ivorians defeated Gabon with the same scoreline in the other game sealing the Moroccans' fate.

=== 2018-2021: First golden generation ===
On 15 October 2017, Morocco were chosen to host the 2018 African Nations Championship to replace original hosts Kenya due to a lack of progress with preparations. By this time, Morocco now coached by Jamal Sellami had already taken part in the qualifiers and defeated Egypt 4-2 on aggregate. The Atlas Lions kicked off their campaign with a 4-0 win over Mauritania, with all goals scored in the second half. This was followed by a 3-1 win over Guinea in which Ayoub El Kaabi scored a hat-trick becoming only the third player to do so in the tournament's history. A goalless draw in the final group game versus Sudan allowed the hosts to advance to the knockout stage as group winners with 7 points but with a better goal difference.

The quarter finals saw Morocco edging past Namibia 2-0 to make it to the semi-finals for the first time in the team's history. Facing their North African rivals Libya, the hosts managed to win 3-1 in extra time. In the final, in a full packed Stade Mohamed V, Morocco became the third North African country to win the title (after Tunisia in 2011 and Libya in 2014), courtesy of a resounding 4-0 win over Nigeria. Zakaria Hadraf (in the 44th and 61st minutes), Walid El Karti (in the 64th minute), as well as Ayoub El Kaabi (in the 73rd minute) were the goalscorers, for their first CHAN title. Morocco thus became the only host nation to win the tournament and had a total of five players featuring in the Team of the Tournament. Additionally, Ayoub El Kaabi finished as top scorer with a record nine goals and earned the Total Man of the Competition award.

Under the leadership of Hussein Ammouta, Morocco comfortably secured qualification to the 2020 African Nations Championship in Cameroon following a 3-0 win on aggregate against Algeria. In the final tournament delayed to 2021 due to COVID-19 pandemic in Africa and its impact, the team, captained by Ayoub El Kaabi, defeated Togo (1–0), drew against Rwanda (0–0), before comprehensively beating Uganda (5–2). In the knockout stages, the Atlas Lions eliminated Zambia (3–1) and hosts Cameroon (4–0) on the way to the final against Mali. At Ahmadou Ahidjo Stadium in Yaoundé, Morocco won 2–0, with both goals scored late into the second half by Soufiane Bouftini and Ayoub El Kaabi. Morocco thus became the first team to win back-to-back titles. Soufiane Rahimi went on to be named Total Man of the tournament after an astonishing performance scoring a total of 5 goals.

=== 2021-2025: Arab Cup disappointment and dissolution ===
In December 2021, Morocco took part in the 2021 FIFA Arab Cup. Drawn in Group C alongside Jordan, Palestine and Saudi Arabia. Morocco opened the tournament with a 4–0 win against Palestine, and then managed to overcome a highly defensive Jordan with the same scoreline, before winning their final match 1–0 against Saudi Arabia. They were eliminated in the quarter-finals after a penalty-shootout against Algeria.

In September 2022, Fouzi Lekjaa the head of the Moroccan FA announced the dissolution of the team and replacing it with their U23 counterparts, to better prepare for the 2023 U-23 Africa Cup of Nations which in turn doubled as the qualifiers for the 2024 Paris Olympics. In this quality, Morocco would have taken part in the 2022 African Nations Championship (delayed to 2023) in Algeria. However, the Moroccans were forced to withdraw following the Algerian authorities' refusal to give clearance to the team's official carrier Royal Air Maroc following on a unilateral decision taken in 2021 to close the Algerian airspace to Moroccan flights. Morocco was originally drawn in Group C alongside Ghana, Madagascar and Sudan.

=== 2025-present: Reemergence and second golden generation ===
In the lead-up to the 2024 African Nations Championship, Tarik Sektioui was appointed as head coach of the national team. Originally, Morocco was to field a team made up of players born on or after 2000. However, that idea was scrapped in July 2025 thereby effectively reinstating the Local team. In the finals, Morocco qualified for the knockout stages after placing second in the group stage, winning against Angola 2–0, losing to co-hosts Kenya 1–0, and defeating both Zambia and DR Congo with the same 3–1 scoreline.

In the quarter-final, they defeated co-hosts Tanzania 1–0. They went on to defeat the title holders Senegal on penalties after a 1–1 draw in the semi-final. In the final which took place at Moi International Sports Centre in Nairobi, the Atlas Lions overcame Madagascar 3–2 in the final to win a record-extending third title in the competition. Oussama Lamlioui finished as top scorer with six goals while Mohamed Rabie Hrimat won the Best player award. This turned out to be the last ever CHAN edition, following an announcement by CAF president Patrice Motsepe on 20 December 2025, to abolish the tournament, and replace it with the African Nations League.

In the 2025 FIFA Arab Cup, Morocco topped their group to qualify for the knockout stages. In the quarter-final, they defeated Syria 1–0. They then progressed to the final after a 3–0 victory over the United Arab Emirates in the semi-final, before winning the tournament by defeating Jordan 3–2 in the final.

== African Nations Championship record ==
| African Nations Championship record | | | | | | | | | Qualification record | | | | | |
| Year | Round | Position | Pld | W | D | L | GF | GA | Pld | W | D | L | GF | GA |
|---|---|---|---|---|---|---|---|---|---|---|---|---|---|---|
| (Ivory Coast) 2009 | Did not qualify | | | | | | | | 4 | 1 | 2 | 1 | 5 | 6 |
| (Sudan) 2011 | Did not qualify | | | | | | | | 2 | 0 | 2 | 0 | 3 | 3 |
| (South Africa) 2014 | Quarter-finals | 8th | 4 | 1 | 2 | 1 | 7 | 6 | 2 | 1 | 1 | 0 | 1 | 0 |
| (Rwanda) 2016 | Group stage | 10th | 3 | 1 | 1 | 1 | 4 | 2 | 4 | 3 | 1 | 0 | 11 | 3 |
| (Morocco) 2018 | Champions | 1st | 6 | 5 | 1 | 0 | 16 | 2 | 2 | 1 | 1 | 0 | 4 | 2 |
| (Cameroon) 2020 | Champions | 1st | 6 | 5 | 1 | 0 | 15 | 3 | 2 | 1 | 1 | 0 | 3 | 0 |
| (Algeria) 2022 | Withdrew | | | | | | | | | | | | | |
| (Kenya) (Tanzania) (Uganda) 2024 | Champions | 1st | 7 | 5 | 1 | 1 | 13 | 6 | Qualified by default | | | | | |
| Total | 3 Titles | 5/8 | 26 | 17 | 6 | 3 | 55 | 19 | 16 | 7 | 8 | 1 | 27 | 14 |

== Recent results and forthcoming fixtures ==
=== 2025 ===
| 3 August CHAN 2024 GS | Morocco | 2–0 | Angola | Nairobi, Kenya |
| 18:00 UTC+3 | Riahi 29'; Quinito 81' (o.g.) | Report | | Stadium: Nyayo National Stadium; Referee: Abdou Abdel Mefire (Cameroon) |

| 10 August CHAN 2024 GS | Kenya | 1–0 | Morocco | Nairobi, Kenya |
| 15:00 UTC+3 | Ogam 42' | Report | | Stadium: Moi International Sports Centre; Referee: Vincent Kabore (Ghana) |

| 14 August CHAN 2024 GS | Morocco | 3–1 | Zambia | Nairobi, Kenya |
| 17:00 UTC+3 | Hrimat 45+2'; Lamlioui 66'; Bougrine 90+5' | Report | Phiri 70' | Stadium: Nyayo National Stadium; Referee: Adalbert Diouf (Senegal) |

| 17 August CHAN 2024 GS | DR Congo | 1–3 | Morocco | Nairobi, Kenya |
| 15:00 UTC+3 | Kitambala 58' | Report | Lamlioui 8', 80'; Hrimat 70' (pen.) | Stadium: Nyayo National Stadium; Referee: Ousmane Diakate (Mali) |

| 22 August CHAN 2024 QF | Tanzania | 0–1 | Morocco | Dar es Salaam, Tanzania |
| 20:00 UTC+3 | | Report | Lamlioui 65' | Stadium: Benjamin Mkapa Stadium; Referee: Abdou Abdel Mefire (Cameroon) |

| 26 August CHAN 2024 SF | Morocco | 1–1 (a.e.t.) (5–3 p) | Senegal | Kampala, Uganda |
| 20:30 UTC+3 | Bougrine 23' | Report | Layousse 16' | Stadium: Mandela National Stadium; Referee: Jelly Chavani (South Africa) |
| | Penalties |
| | Hrimat (penalty scored); Lamlioui (penalty scored); Khairi (penalty scored); Bach (penalty scored); Mehri (penalty scored) | | Ndiaye (penalty missed); Vieux (penalty scored); Ciss (penalty scored); Ba (penalty scored) |

| 30 August CHAN 2024 Final | Madagascar | 2–3 | Morocco | Nairobi, Kenya |
| 18:00 UTC+3 | Mantasoa 9'; Rakotondraibe 68' | Report | Mehri 27'; Lamlioui 44', 80' | Stadium: Moi International Sports Centre; Referee: Abdou Abdel Mefire (Cameroon) |

| 2 December 2025 FIFA Arab Cup Group B | Morocco | 3–1 | Comoros | Al Rayyan, Qatar |
| 15:00 UTC+3 | Bouftini 5'; Tissoudali 11'; El Berkaoui 45+4' | Report | Boulacsoute 56' (o.g.) | Stadium: Khalifa International Stadium; Attendance: 10,246; Referee: Ma Ning (China) |

| 5 December 2025 FIFA Arab Cup Group B | Oman | 0–0 | Morocco | Al Rayyan, Qatar |
| 17:30 UTC+3 | | Report | | Stadium: Education City Stadium; Attendance: 37,996; Referee: Juan Gabriel Benítez (Paraguay) |

| 8 December 2025 FIFA Arab Cup Group B | Morocco | 1–0 | Saudi Arabia | Lusail, Qatar |
| 20:00 UTC+3 | El Berkaoui 11' | Report | | Stadium: Lusail Stadium; Attendance: 78,131; Referee: Mario Escobar (Guatemala) |

| 11 December 2025 FIFA Arab Cup Quarter-finals | Morocco | 1–0 | Syria | Al Rayyan, Qatar |
| 17:30 UTC+3 | Azaro 79' | Report | | Stadium: Khalifa International Stadium; Attendance: 39,167; Referee: Cristián Garay (Chile) |

| 15 December 2025 FIFA Arab Cup Semi-finals | Morocco | 3–0 | United Arab Emirates | Al Rayyan, Qatar |
| 17:30 UTC+3 | | | | Stadium: Khalifa International Stadium |

| 18 December 2025 FIFA Arab Cup Final | Jordan | 2–3 (a.e.t.) | Morocco | Lusail, Qatar |
| 19:00 UTC+3 | Olwan 48', 68' (pen.) | Report | Tannane 4'; Hamdallah 88', 100' | Stadium: Lusail Stadium; Attendance: 84,517; Referee: Glenn Nyberg (Sweden) |

== Head-to-head record ==
The list below shows the Morocco A' national football team all−time head-to-head record in official games, which includes the African Nations Championship, the FIFA Arab Cup and their respective qualifiers.

Key

Positive balance
Neutral balance
Negative balance

Morocco national football team head-to-head record
| Against | Pld | W | D | L | GF | GA | GD | Confederation |
|---|---|---|---|---|---|---|---|---|
| Algeria | 5 | 1 | 4 | 0 | 7 | 4 | +3 | CAF |
| Angola | 1 | 1 | 0 | 0 | 2 | 0 | +2 | CAF |
| Bahrain | 1 | 1 | 0 | 0 | 4 | 0 | +4 | AFC |
| Burkina Faso | 1 | 0 | 1 | 0 | 1 | 1 | +0 | CAF |
| Cameroon | 1 | 1 | 0 | 0 | 4 | 0 | +4 | CAF |
| Comoros | 1 | 1 | 0 | 0 | 3 | 1 | +2 | CAF |
| DR Congo | 1 | 1 | 0 | 0 | 3 | 1 | +2 | CAF |
| Egypt | 2 | 1 | 1 | 0 | 4 | 2 | +2 | CAF |
| Gabon | 1 | 0 | 1 | 0 | 0 | 0 | +0 | CAF |
| Guinea | 1 | 1 | 0 | 0 | 3 | 1 | +2 | CAF |
| Iraq | 1 | 1 | 0 | 0 | 2 | 1 | +1 | AFC |
| Ivory Coast | 1 | 0 | 0 | 1 | 0 | 1 | –1 | CAF |
| Jordan | 2 | 2 | 0 | 0 | 7 | 2 | +5 | AFC |
| Kenya | 1 | 0 | 0 | 1 | 0 | 1 | –1 | CAF |
| Libya | 7 | 4 | 2 | 1 | 14 | 6 | +8 | CAF |
| Madagascar | 1 | 1 | 0 | 0 | 3 | 2 | +1 | CAF |
| Mali | 1 | 1 | 0 | 0 | 2 | 0 | +2 | CAF |
| Mauritania | 1 | 1 | 0 | 0 | 4 | 0 | +4 | CAF |
| Namibia | 1 | 1 | 0 | 0 | 2 | 0 | +2 | CAF |
| Nigeria | 2 | 1 | 0 | 1 | 7 | 4 | +3 | CAF |
| Oman | 1 | 0 | 1 | 0 | 0 | 0 | +0 | AFC |
| Palestine | 1 | 1 | 0 | 0 | 4 | 0 | +4 | AFC |
| Rwanda | 2 | 1 | 1 | 0 | 4 | 1 | +3 | CAF |
| Saudi Arabia | 2 | 2 | 0 | 0 | 2 | 0 | +2 | AFC |
| Senegal | 1 | 0 | 1 | 0 | 1 | 1 | +0 | CAF |
| Sudan | 1 | 0 | 1 | 0 | 0 | 0 | 0 | CAF |
| Syria | 1 | 1 | 0 | 0 | 1 | 0 | +1 | AFC |
| Tanzania | 1 | 1 | 0 | 0 | 1 | 0 | +1 | CAF |
| Togo | 1 | 1 | 0 | 0 | 1 | 0 | +1 | CAF |
| Tunisia | 6 | 2 | 4 | 0 | 8 | 6 | +2 | CAF |
| Uganda | 2 | 2 | 0 | 0 | 8 | 3 | +5 | CAF |
| United Arab Emirates | 1 | 1 | 0 | 0 | 3 | 0 | +3 | AFC |
| Yemen | 1 | 1 | 0 | 0 | 4 | 0 | +4 | AFC |
| Zambia | 2 | 2 | 0 | 0 | 6 | 2 | +4 | CAF |
| Zimbabwe | 1 | 0 | 1 | 0 | 0 | 0 | 0 | CAF |
| Total | 57 | 35 | 18 | 4 | 115 | 40 | +75 | — |
Last match updated was against Jordan on 18 December 2025.

== Honours and awards ==
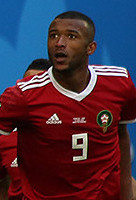
Ayoub El Kaabi the best player and scorer of the 2018 African Nations Championship.

=== Honours ===
African Nations Championship

- Champions: 2018, 2020, 2024

FIFA Arab Cup

- (gold) Champions: 2012, 2025

=== Awards ===
African Nations Championship Best player

- 2018: Ayoub El Kaabi
- 2020: Soufiane Rahimi
- 2024: Mohamed Rabie Hrimat

African Nations Championship Top scorer

- 2018: Ayoub El Kaabi
- 2020: Soufiane Rahimi
- 2024: Oussama Lamlioui

African Nations Championship Best goalkeeper

- 2020: Anas Zniti

FIFA Arab Cup Best player

- 2012: Yassine Salhi
- 2025: Mohamed Rabie Hrimat

FIFA Arab Cup Top scorer

- 2012: Yassine Salhi

FIFA Arab Cup Best goalkeeper

- 2025: Mehdi Benabid

== Squad ==
The following 23 players were called up for the 2025 FIFA Arab Cup to be held from 1 to 18 December 2025.
Caps and goals are correct as of 7 December 2025, after the match against Saudi Arabia.

| No. | Pos. | Player | Date of birth (age) | Caps | Goals | Club |
|---|---|---|---|---|---|---|
| 1 | GK | Salaheddine Chihab | 23 February 1993 (age 33) | 1 | 0 | (Royal Moroccan Football Federation) MAS Fès |
| 12 | GK | Mehdi Benabid | 24 January 1998 (age 28) | 2 | 0 | (Royal Moroccan Football Federation) Wydad Casablanca |
| 22 | GK | Rachid Ghanimi | 25 April 2001 (age 25) | 0 | 0 | (Royal Moroccan Football Federation) FUS Rabat |
| 2 | DF | Mohamed Moufid | 12 January 2000 (age 26) | 2 | 0 | (Royal Moroccan Football Federation) Wydad Casablanca |
| 3 | DF | Anas Bach | 10 February 1998 (age 28) | 3 | 0 | (Royal Moroccan Football Federation) AS FAR |
| 4 | DF | Soufiane Bouftini | 3 May 1994 (age 32) | 10 | 3 | (United Arab Emirates Football Association) Al Wasl |
| 5 | DF | Mahmoud Bentayg | 30 October 1999 (age 27) | 1 | 0 | (Egyptian Football Association) Zamalek |
| 7 | DF | Mohamed Boulacsoute | 23 September 1998 (age 28) | 3 | 0 | (Royal Moroccan Football Federation) Raja Casablanca |
| 15 | DF | Marouane Louadni | 21 December 1994 (age 31) | 2 | 0 | (Royal Moroccan Football Federation) AS FAR |
| 18 | DF | Marwane Saâdane | 17 January 1992 (age 34) | 3 | 0 | (Saudi Arabian Football Federation) Al-Fateh |
| 19 | DF | Hamza El Moussaoui | 7 April 1993 (age 33) | 9 | 1 | (Royal Moroccan Football Federation) RS Berkane |
| 6 | MF | Mohamed Rabie Hrimat | 17 August 1994 (age 32) | 3 | 0 | (Royal Moroccan Football Federation) AS FAR |
| 8 | MF | Sabir Bougrine | 10 July 1996 (age 30) | 7 | 2 | (Royal Moroccan Football Federation) Raja Casablanca |
| 10 | MF | Amine Zouhzouh | 11 August 2000 (age 26) | 4 | 0 | (Qatar Football Association) Al-Wakrah |
| 13 | MF | Walid El Karti | 23 July 1994 (age 32) | 23 | 3 | (Egyptian Football Association) Pyramids |
| 14 | MF | Oussama Tannane | 23 March 1994 (age 32) | 12 | 2 | (Qatar Football Association) Umm-Salal |
| 16 | MF | Aschraf El Mahdioui | 24 May 1996 (age 30) | 3 | 0 | (Saudi Arabian Football Federation) Al-Taawoun |
| 9 | FW | Abderrazak Hamdallah | 17 December 1990 (age 35) | 27 | 7 | (Saudi Arabian Football Federation) Al-Shabab |
| 11 | FW | Walid Azaro | 11 June 1995 (age 31) | 7 | 0 | (United Arab Emirates Football Association) Ajman |
| 17 | FW | Mounir Chouiar | 23 January 1999 (age 27) | 0 | 0 | (Royal Moroccan Football Federation) RS Berkane |
| 20 | FW | Tarik Tissoudali | 2 April 1993 (age 33) | 14 | 3 | (United Arab Emirates Football Association) Khor Fakkan |
| 21 | FW | Karim El Berkaoui | 29 March 1995 (age 31) | 3 | 2 | (United Arab Emirates Football Association) Al Dhafra |
| 23 | FW | Hamza Hannouri | 22 January 1998 (age 28) | 0 | 0 | (Royal Moroccan Football Federation) Wydad Casablanca |

Manager: (Morocco) Tarik Sektioui

=== Previous squads ===
African Nations Championship squads

- CHAN 2014 squad
- CHAN 2016 squad
- CHAN 2018 squad
- CHAN 2020 squad
- CHAN 2024 squad

FIFA Arab Cup squads

- AC 2012 squad
- FAC 2021 squad
- FAC 2025 squad
