= Ahmed Azzaqa =

Libyan footballer (born 1988)

Personal information
- Date of birth: 9 August 1988 (age 38)
- Place of birth: Sabha, Libya
- Height: 1.86 m (6 ft 1 in)
- Position: Goalkeeper

Team information
- Current team: Olympic Azzaweya

Senior career*
| Years | Team | Apps | (Gls) |
| 2010–2016 | Al-Hilal Benghazi | | |
| 2017–2021 | Al-Madina | | |
| 2021–2022 | Al-Ahly Benghazi | | |
| 2022– | Olympic Azzaweya | | |

International career
| 2017–2021 | Libya | 15 | (0) |
Medal record
Men's football
Representing Libya
Arab Cup
| Runner-up | 2012 Saudi Arabia |
- * Club domestic league appearances and goals

Ahmed Abdulsalam Azzaqa (Arabic: احمد عبدالسلام عزاقة; born 9 August 1988) is a Libyan professional footballer who plays as a goalkeeper for Libyan Premier League club Olympic Azzaweya.

== Career statistics ==
=== International ===
Appearances and goals by national team and year
| National team | Year | Apps | Goals |
|---|---|---|---|
| Libya | 2017 | 3 | 0 |
| Libya | 2018 | 1 | 0 |
| Libya | 2019 | 5 | 0 |
| Libya | 2020 | 2 | 0 |
| Libya | 2021 | 4 | 0 |
| Total | | 15 | 0 |

== Honours ==
Libya

- Arab Cup: runner-up, 2012
