= Muhammad Al Maghrabi =

Libyan footballer (born 1985)

Personal information
- Date of birth: 19 April 1985 (age 41)
- Place of birth: Tarābulus, Libya
- Height: 1.81 m (5 ft 11 in)
- Position: Right-back

Senior career*
Years	Team	Apps	(Gls)
2004–2011	Al Ahly Tripoli		
2011–2012	Olympique Khouribga	12	(0)
2012–2016	Al Ahly Tripoli		

International career
2006–2013	Libya	50	(4)
Medal record
Men's football
Representing Libya
Arab Cup
Runner-up	2012 Saudi Arabia
- * Club domestic league appearances and goals

Mohammed Al Maghrabi (Arabic: مُحَمَّد الْمَغْرِبِيّ; born 19 April 1985) is a Libyan former professional footballer who played as a right-back. He earned 50 caps for the Libya national team.

== Honours ==
Libya

- Arab Cup: runner-up, 2012
