= Mehdi Benabid =

Moroccan footballer (born 1998)

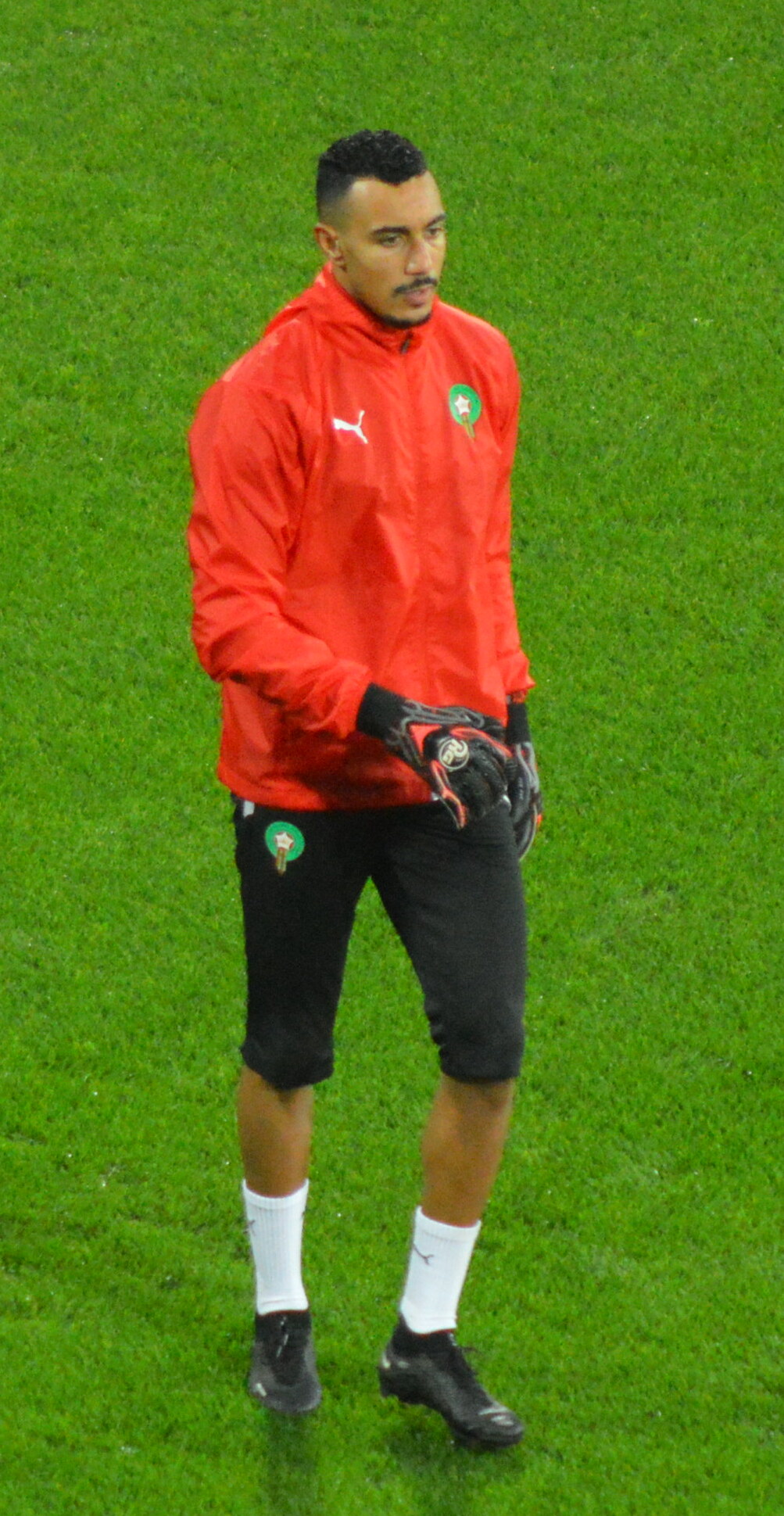

Personal information
- Full name: El Mehdi Benabid
- Date of birth: 24 January 1998 (age 28)
- Place of birth: Rabat, Morocco
- Height: 1.88 m (6 ft 2 in)
- Position: Goalkeeper

Team information
- Current team: Wydad AC
- Number: 16

Youth career
- 2007–2017: FUS Rabat

Senior career*
| Years | Team | Apps | (Gls) |
| 2017–2023 | FUS Rabat | 100 | (0) |
| 2017–2018 | → Ittihad Khemisset (loan) | 10 | (0) |
| 2023–2025 | AS FAR | 32 | (0) |
| 2025– | Wydad AC | 0 | (0) |

International career^{‡}
| 2017 | Morocco U20 | 2 | (0) |
| 2018–2019 | Morocco U23 | 6 | (0) |
| 2021–2025 | Morocco A' | 5 | (0) |
| 2022– | Morocco | 0 | (0) |
Medal record
Men's football
Representing Morocco
FIFA Arab Cup
| Winner | 2025 Qatar | Team |
- * Club domestic league appearances and goals as of 20:57, 27 August 2023 (UTC) ‡ National team caps and goals as of 20:57, 26 May 2023 (UTC)

El Mehdi Benabid (Arabic: مهدي بنعبيد; born 24 January 1998) is a Moroccan professional footballer who plays as a goalkeeper for Botola Pro club Wydad AC and the Morocco national team.

== Career ==
Benabid is a youth product of FUS Rabat since 2007, and worked his way up their youth categories. For the 2017–18 season, he was loaned out to Ittihad Khemisset in the Botola 2 where he began his senior career. He returned to FUS Rabat in 2018, where he became a regular in their squad.

== International career ==
Benabid was first called up to the Morocco U20s in 2017. In March 2019, he was called up to the Morocco U23s for a set of friendlies. He was called up for a set of 2021 U-20 Africa Cup of Nations qualification matches, in which the Morocco U20s missed qualification. In November 2019, he was suspended because of an altercation with a referee and banned from football for 3 months. In June 2021, he was called up to the Morocco A' national team for a set of friendlies.

In March 2022, Benabid receives his first call-up to the senior Morocco national team. On 28 December 2023, Benabid was amongst the 27 players selected to represent Morocco in the 2023 Africa Cup of Nations.

== Personal life ==
On 9 September 2023, Benabid along with his national teammates donated their blood for the needy affected by the 2023 Marrakesh-Safi earthquake.

== Honours ==
Morocco A'

- FIFA Arab Cup: 2025

Individual

- Botola Pro Team of the Season: 2022–23
- Botola Pro Goalkeeper of the Season: 2022–23
- FIFA Arab Cup Golden Glove: 2025
