= Salem Ablo =

Libyan footballer (born 1991)

Personal information
- Full name: Salem Ahmed M'Hamed Ablo
- Date of birth: 20 April 1991 (age 35)
- Place of birth: Tripoli, Libya
- Height: 1.73 m (5 ft 8 in)
- Position: Midfielder

Team information
- Current team: Al-Madina

Senior career*
Years	Team	Apps	(Gls)
2010–2019	Al-Ahly Tripoli		
2020	Hammam-Lif	8	(0)
2021–	Al-Madina		

International career^{‡}
2012–	Libya	23	(2)
Medal record
Men's football
Representing Libya
Arab Cup
Runner-up	2012 Saudi Arabia
- * Club domestic league appearances and goals as of 18:14, 28 March 2021 (UTC) ‡ National team caps and goals as of 18:14, 28 March 2021 (UTC)

Salem Ablo (born 20 April 1991) is a Libyan footballer who plays as a midfielder.

== International career ==
=== International goals ===
Scores and results list Libya's goal tally first.

No	Date	Venue	Opponent	Score	Result	Competition
1.	1 June 2013	Stade du 11 Juin, Tripoli, Libya	Uganda	2–0	3–0	Friendly
2.	3 February 2018	Stade de Marrakech, Marrakesh, Morocco	Sudan	1–1	1–1 (2–4 p)	2018 African Nations Championship

== Honours ==
Libya

- Arab Cup: runner-up, 2012
