= Abdulaziz Belraysh =

Libyan footballer (born 1990)

Abdulaziz Belreesh عبدالعزيز بلريش
Personal information
- Full name: Abdulaziz El-Hadi Belreesh
- Date of birth: July 12, 1990 (age 36)
- Place of birth: Tripoli, Libya
- Height: 1.79 m (5 ft 10 1/2 in)
- Position: Right back

Youth career
- Al-Ittihad

Senior career*
Years	Team	Apps	(Gls)
2009–2015	Al-Ittihad		

International career
2010–	Libya	15	(0)
Medal record
Men's football
Representing Libya
Arab Cup
Runner-up	2012 Saudi Arabia
- * Club domestic league appearances and goals as of January 27, 2008

Abdulaziz Belreesh (Arabic: عبد العزيز بالريش; born July 12, 1990) is a Libyan footballer. He currently plays for Libyan Premier League club Ittihad, as a defender.

== Career ==
Belreesh was a young talent, and a product of the Ittihad youth system. His displays during the 2008–09 season earned him the Young Player of the Year award.

He was called up to the national team for their friendly with Benin on January 6, 2010. He was also called up for their friendly with Mali, on March 3, 2010, starting in both matches, thus becoming a starting player with Libya by the age of 19.

== Honours ==
Libya

- Arab Cup: runner-up, 2012
