= Muhammad Nashnoush =

Libyan footballer (born 1988)

Personal information
- Full name: Muhammad Fathi Nashnoush
- Date of birth: June 14, 1988 (age 38)
- Place of birth: Tripoli, Libya
- Height: 1.90 m (6 ft 3 in)
- Position: Goalkeeper

Senior career*
Years	Team	Apps	(Gls)
2010–2011	Al-Shat	?	(0)
2011–2013	Al-Ittihad	0	(0)
2013–2025	Al-Ahli Tripoli	200	(2)

International career
2011–2021	Libya	76	(0)
Medal record
Men's football
Representing Libya
Arab Cup
Runner-up	2012 Saudi Arabia
African Nations Championship
Winner	2014 South Africa
- * Club domestic league appearances and goals

Muhammad Fathi Nashnoush (Arabic: مُحَمَّد فَتْحِيّ نَشْنُوش; born June 14, 1988), is a Libyan footballer who currently plays as a goalkeeper.

== Club career ==
Muhammad Nashnoush started his career at Al-Shat in 2010. In 2011, he signed for Al-Ittihad Tripoli. However, he did not make any appearances for the club after the 2010–11 Libyan Premier League was cancelled due to the 2011 Libyan Civil War. After the war ended and the league started, he signed for Al-Ahly Tripoli. He is now the vice-captain and the first-choice goalkeeper of the club. He won 3 Libyan premier leagues. On December 12, 2023, He became the first Al Ahli Tripoli goalkeeper to reach 100 clean sheets for the club. During this time he holds the record for the goalkeeper with the longest time maintaining a clean sheet as he managed to go 13 matches consecutively or 1230 minutes without conceding a goal. The most in Libyan premier league history.

== International career ==
Muhammad Nashnoush was first called into the Libyan national football team in 2010. He made his first appearance in a 2012 Africa Cup of Nations qualification match against Comoros in June 2011, coming on as a substitute. The match ended 1–1. After qualifying for the Africa Cup of Nations, he was named in the 23-man squad to compete in the tournament. However, he was an unused substitute in the whole tournament.

In 2014, he was called into the national team for the 2014 African Nations Championship where he helped the team through three consecutive penalty shoot-outs in the knockout stage, including scoring the winning penalty in the semi-final shootout with Zimbabwe. Libya won the tournament (their first continental title) in the final match against Ghana.

== Honours ==
Libya

- Arab Cup: runner-up, 2012
- African Nations Championship: 2014
