= Hamed Snousi =

Libyan footballer (born 1989)

Personal information
- Full name: Hamed Snousi Haneesh
- Date of birth: November 3, 1989 (age 37)
- Place of birth: Benghazi, Libya
- Position: Left back

Team information
- Current team: Hmam Al Anf

Senior career*
Years	Team	Apps	(Gls)
2007–2012	Ahly Benghazi	43	(1)
2012–	Hmam Al Anf		

International career
2010–	Libya	4	(1)
Medal record
Men's football
Representing Libya
Arab Cup
Runner-up	2012 Saudi Arabia
- * Club domestic league appearances and goals as of 16:59, 30 December 2009 (UTC)

Hamed Snousi (Arabic: حمد السنوسي) (born November 3, 1989) is a Libyan footballer.

== Career ==
He currently plays for Hmam Al Anf in Tunisia. He played for Ahly Benghazi in years 2007–2012 in which he was a defender, and wore the number 3 jersey.

== Honours ==
Libya

- Arab Cup: runner-up, 2012
