= Abdul-Hafeedh Arbeesh =

Libyan footballer and manager (born 1963)

Personal information
- Date of birth: 23 July 1963 (age 63)
- Place of birth: Tripoli, Libya
- Position: Defender

Senior career*
Years	Team	Apps	(Gls)
1981–1993	Al-Madina S.C.		

International career
- Libya

Managerial career
- 1998–2000: Al-Madina S.C. (assistant)
- 2000–2001: Al-Madina S.C.
- 2001–2002: Wefaq Sabratha
- 2003–2004: Al-Shat S.C.
- 2004–2005: Al Urouba (Ajelat)
- 2005: Khaleej Sirte S.C.
- 2005: Libya (assistant)
- 2006–2007: Al-Madina S.C.
- 2007–2008: Khaleej Sirte S.C.
- 2008–2009: Libya U-17
- 2009–2010: Al-Hilal SC (Benghazi)
- 2010–2011: Darnes S.C.
- 2011–2012: Libya (assistant)
- 2012–2013: Libya
- 2019: Zakho
Medal record
Men's football
Representing Libya (as manager)
Arab Cup
Runner-up	2012 Saudi Arabia
- * Club domestic league appearances and goals

Abdul-Hafeedh Arbeesh (born July 23, 1963) is a Libyan professional football player and manager. He plays as a defender for Al-Madina S.C. In 1998, he began his coaching career. He was a coach of the clubs Al-Madina S.C., Wefaq Sabratha, Al-Shat S.C., Al Urouba (Ajelat), Khaleej Sirte S.C., Al-Hilal SC (Benghazi) and Darnes S.C. Since March 2012 until September 2013 he coached the Libya national football team.

== Managerial statistics ==
As of match played 4 October 2019

Managerial record by team and tenure
Team	From	To	Record					Ref.
Team	From	To	P	W	D	L	Win %	Ref.
Zakho	7 August 2019	4 October 2019	6	1	0	5	16.7	
Total			6	1	0	5	16.7	—

== Honours ==
=== Manager ===
Libya

- Arab Cup: runner-up, 2012
