= Ali Salama =

Libyan footballer (born 1987)

Personal information
- Date of birth: 18 September 1987 (age 39)
- Place of birth: Benghazi, Libya
- Height: 1.85 m (6 ft 1 in)
- Position: Center back

Team information
- Current team: Al-Ahli Tripoli
- Number: 14

Senior career*
Years	Team	Apps	(Gls)
2005–2006	Al-Nasr Benghazi		
2006–2011	Al-Ahly Benghazi		
2011–2012	Olympique Béja		
2012–2013	TE Beni Suef	15	(0)
2013–2018	Al-Ahli Tripoli		
2018–2021	Al-Madina SC		
2021–	Al-Nasr Benghazi	7	(1)

International career
2010–	Libya	54	(2)
Medal record
Men's football
Representing Libya
Arab Cup
Runner-up	2012 Saudi Arabia
African Nations Championship
Winner	2014 South Africa
- * Club domestic league appearances and goals as of 27 July 2025 @ 17:03(AEST)

Ali Salama (Arabic: عَلِيّ سَلَامَة; born September 18, 1987) is a Libyan footballer, currently playing for Al-Nasr Benghazi in the Libyan Premier League. At 6'1, he plays as a sweeper or centre-back. He captained his national team to victory in the 2014 African Nations Championship.

== Honours ==
Libya

- Arab Cup: runner-up, 2012
- African Nations Championship: 2014
