= Mohamed Al Ghanodi =

Libyan footballer (born 1992)

Mohamed Al Ghannudi
Personal information
- Date of birth: 22 November 1992 (age 33)
- Place of birth: Libya
- Position: Forward

Team information
- Current team: Al-Ahli Tripoli

Senior career*
Years	Team	Apps	(Gls)
2011–	Al-Ahli Tripoli	?	(?)

International career^{‡}
2011–	Libya	40	(6)
Medal record
Men's football
Representing Libya
Runner-up	2012 Saudi Arabia
African Nations Championship
Winner	2014 South Africa
- * Club domestic league appearances and goals as of 23 May 2012 ‡ National team caps and goals as of 14 February 2017

Mohamed Al Ghanodi (Arabic: محمد الغنودي; born 22 November 1992) is a Libyan international footballer who plays for Al-Ahli as a striker. He is a member of Libya national football team, played a match against Senegal in 2012 Africa Cup of Nations.

== International career ==
=== International goals ===
Scores and results list Libya's goal tally first.

No	Date	Venue	Opponent	Score	Result	Competition
1.	29 June 2012	King Fahd Stadium, Ta'if, Saudi Arabia	Bahrain	2–1	2–1	2012 Arab Nations Cup
2.	1 June 2013	June 11 Stadium, Tripoli, Libya	Uganda	1–0	3–0	Friendly
3.	27 August 2013	Terrain El Mouradi Hammam Bourguiba, Aïn Draham, Tunisia	Mali	1–0	1–0	Friendly
4.	28 August 2015	Green Park Hotel Stadium, Kartepe, Turkey	Tanzania	1–0	2–1	Friendly
5.	17 November 2015	Stade Régional Nyamirambo, Kigali, Rwanda	Rwanda	2–1	3–1	2018 FIFA World Cup qualification
6.	8 January 2017	Stade Municipal de Kintélé, Brazzaville, Republic of Congo	Senegal	1–2	1–2	Friendly

== Honours ==
Libya

- Arab Cup: runner-up, 2012
- African Nations Championship: 2014
