= Sami Abdullah =

Sudanese footballer

Sami Abdullah (born 17 February 1987) is a Sudanese defender playing for the Sudanese club Al-Hilal. He came to Al-Hilal in June 2009, on a free transfer from Ahli Madani.
