= Abdulmajeed Al-Ruwaili =

Saudi Arabian footballer

Personal information
- Full name: Abdulmajeed Abdullah Al-Ruwaili
- Date of birth: August 28, 1986 (age 40)
- Place of birth: Saudi Arabia
- Height: 1.68 m (5 ft 6 in)
- Position: Midfielder

Youth career
- Al-Orobah

Senior career*
| Years | Team | Apps | (Gls) |
| 2006–2009 | Al-Orobah | | |
| 2009–2012 | Al-Raed | 67 | (6) |
| 2012–2015 | Al-Shabab | 45 | (5) |
| 2015–2016 | Al-Taawon | 26 | (13) |
| 2016–2017 | Al-Hilal | 14 | (1) |
| 2017–2018 | Al-Fayha | 10 | (0) |
| 2018 | → Al-Taawoun (loan) | 8 | (2) |
| 2018–2022 | Al-Orobah | 89 | (8) |

International career^{‡}
| 2012–2017 | Saudi Arabia | 11 | (2) |
- * Club domestic league appearances and goals as of 21 April 2021 (UTC) ‡ National team caps and goals as of 3 July 2017 (UTC)

Abdulmajeed Abdullah Al-Ruwaili (Arabic: عبدالمجيد عبدالله الرويلي; born 28 August 1986) is a retired Saudi Arabian professional footballer who played as a midfielder.

== Club career ==
=== Al-Taawoun ===
In 2015, Abdulmajeed went to Al-Taawoun from Al-Shabab. He made a record in Saudi League for the most Saudi player that scores from penalties which were four and still counting. He scored 13 goals from midfield, at that season he was the most Saudi player to score goals.

=== Al-Hilal ===
On 29 June 2016, Al-Hilal signed Al-Ruwaili with a two-year contract. He scored his first goal against Al-Qadisiyah. In that season he won the league and the Kings Cup.

=== Al-Fayha ===
On 9 June 2017, Al-Fayha signed Abdulmajeed with a two-year contract.

== Statistics ==
As of 3 June 2017

| Club | Season | Saudi Premier League | | Crown Prince Cup | | King Cup | | Saudi Super Cup | | AFC Champions League | | Total | |
| Club | Season | Apps | Goals | Apps | Goals | Apps | Goals | Apps | Goals | Apps | Goals | Apps | Goals |
|---|---|---|---|---|---|---|---|---|---|---|---|---|---|
Al-Taawoun
| Al-Taawoun | 2015-16 | 26 | 13 | 2 | 0 | 1 | 0 | - | - | - | - | 26 | 13 |
Al-Hilal
| Al-Hilal | 2016-17 | 14 | 1 | 3 | 0 | 3 | 0 | 1 | 0 | 2 | 0 | 23 | 1 |
| Career total | | 40 | 14 | 5 | 0 | 4 | 0 | 1 | 0 | 2 | 0 | 52 | 14 |

== International goals ==
Scores and results list Saudi Arabia's goal tally first.

| No | Date | Venue | Opponent | Score | Result | Competition |
|---|---|---|---|---|---|---|
| 1. | 28 June 2012 | King Fahd International Stadium, Riyadh, Saudi Arabia | Palestine | 1–0 | 2–2 | 2012 Arab Nations Cup |
| 2. | 14 January 2017 | Zayed Sports City Stadium, Abu Dhabi, United Arab Emirates | Cambodia | 7–2 | 7–2 | Friendly |

== Honours ==
Al-Shabab

- Kings Cup: 2014

Al-Hilal

- Saudi Professional League: 2016–17
- Kings Cup: 2017
