= Mowaia Bashir =

Sudanese international footballer

Mowaia Fadasi
Personal information
- Full name: Mowaia Bashir Osman Koko
- Date of birth: 17 April 1986 (age 40)
- Place of birth: Khartoum, Sudan
- Position: Left back

Senior career*
Years	Team	Apps	(Gls)
2010–2012	Al-Ittihad SC (Wad Medani)	43	(2)
2012–2016	Al-Hilal Club		
2017	Hay Al-Wadi SC		

International career^{‡}
2011–2016	Sudan	20	(2)
Medal record
Men's football
Representing Sudan
CECAFA Cup
Third place	2011 Tanzania
- * Club domestic league appearances and goals as of 23 January 2012 ‡ National team caps and goals as of 17 April 2017

Mowaia Bashir Koko (born 17 April 1986) is a Sudanese international footballer who plays for Al-Hilal as a defender. He previously played for Al-Ittihad Wad Medani and transferred to the Blue waves in June 2012.

== International career ==
=== International goals ===
Scores and results list Sudan's goal tally first.

No	Date	Venue	Opponent	Score	Result	Competition
1.	3 December 2011	National Stadium, Dar es Salaam, Tanzania	Kenya	1–0	1–0	2011 CECAFA Cup
2.	27 June 2012	Prince Abdullah Al Faisal Stadium, Jeddah, Saudi Arabia	Lebanon	2–0	2–0	2012 Arab Nations Cup

== Honours ==
Sudan

- CECAFA Cup: 3rd place, 2011
