= Selim Jedidi =

Tunisian football referee

- Born: 1970 (age 55–56)

International
Years	League	Role
2007–	FIFA listed	Referee

Selim Jedidi (born 1970) is a Tunisian football referee who has been FIFA listed since 2007.

== Refereeing career ==
Jedidi was a referee at the 2012 Olympic Football Tournament.

After taking charge of a contentious match between Burkina Faso and Ghana at 2013 Africa Cup of Nations, the Confederation of African Football (CAF) suggested that Jedidi would be suspended, however Jedidi later claimed not to be aware of any suspension.
