= Mohamed Abdelmoneim Ankaba =

Sudanese footballer

Mohamed Abdelmoneim
Personal information
- Full name: Mohamed Abdelmoneim Marhoum
- Date of birth: July 1, 1990 (age 36)
- Place of birth: Sudan
- Height: 1.75 m (5 ft 9 in)
- Position: Forward

Team information
- Current team: Al Ahli SC (Khartoum)
- Number: 24

Senior career*
Years	Team	Apps	(Gls)
2007-2008	Ombada SC		
2009-2012	Al Khartoum SC		
2013-2016	Al-Merrikh SC		
2015	El-Hilal SC El-Obeid (loan)		
2017	El-Hilal SC El-Obeid		
2018	Al-Merreikh SC (Al-Fasher)		
2018-2019	Al-Mourada SC		
2019-	Al Ahli SC (Khartoum)		

International career
2010-	Sudan	16	(1)
- * Club domestic league appearances and goals

Mohamed Abdelmineim Ankaba is a Sudanese footballer who plays for the Sudanese national team and for Al-Merrikh SC in the Sudan Premier League. His position is a striker and also centre forward.

He played in a 2012 Summer Olympics qualifying match against Egypt on June 4, 2011 and for the Sudan B Team in the Football at the 2011 Pan Arab Games.
