= Yassine Salhi (footballer, born 1987) =

Moroccan footballer

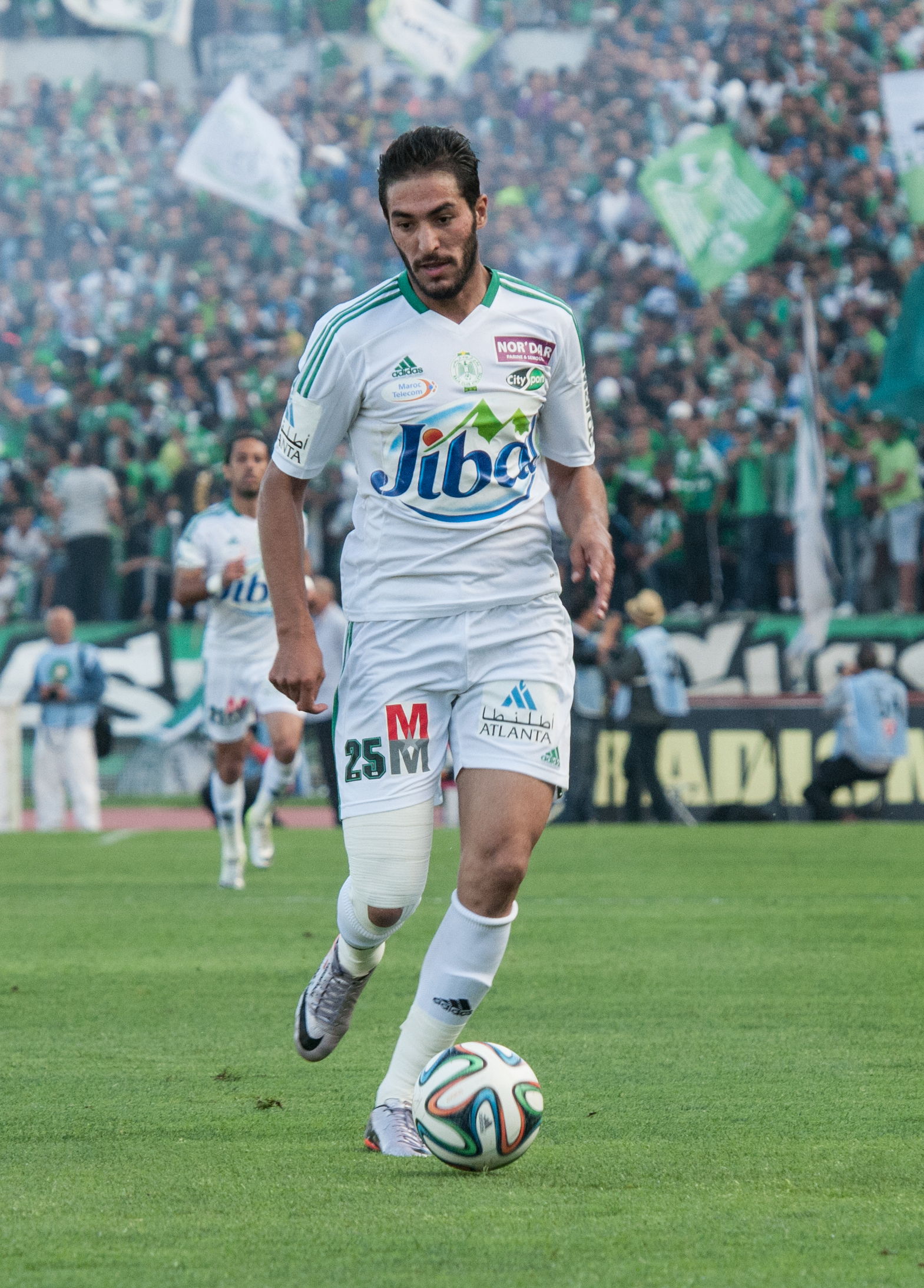
- Salhi with Raja Casablanca in 2014

Personal information
- Full name: Yassine Salhi
- Date of birth: 3 November 1987 (age 39)
- Place of birth: Casablanca, Morocco
- Height: 1.86 m (6 ft 1 in)
- Position: Forward

Youth career
- Raja Casablanca

Senior career*
Years	Team	Apps	(Gls)
2007–2016	Raja Casablanca	145	(77)
2007–2009	→ Racing Casablanca (loan)	30	(24)
2016	→ Kuwait SC (loan)	16	(8)
2016–2018	Moghreb Tétouan	19	(7)
2017	→ Al-Dhafra (loan)	12	(9)
2018–2019	Al Urooba	7	(2)
2020	Raja Beni Mellal	7	(2)

International career
2012	Morocco	10	(7)
Medal record
Men's football
Representing Morocco
FIFA Arab Cup
Winner	2012 Saudi Arabia
- * Club domestic league appearances and goals

Yassine Salhi (Arabic: ياسين الصالحي; born 3 November 1987) is a Moroccan former professional footballer who played as a forward.

== International career ==
Salhi won the 2012 FIFA Arab Cup with Morocco A' as the Tournament's Best Player and Top Goalscorer with six goals.

== Career statistics ==
=== Club ===
As of 25 May 2013

Club	Season	League		Cup		Other		Total	
Club	Season	Apps	Goals	Apps	Goals	Apps	Goals	Apps	Goals
Raja Casablanca	2009-10	1	1	-	-	-	-	1	1
Raja Casablanca	2010-11	28	7	-	-	-	-	28	7
Raja Casablanca	2011-12	26	8	-	-	-	-	26	8
Raja Casablanca	2012-13	19	7	2	1	4	1	25	9
Career Total		74	23	2	1	4	1	80	25

=== International ===
#	Date	Venue	Opponent	Score	Result	Competition
1	23 June 2012	Prince Abdullah al-Faisal Stadium, Jeddah (N)	Bahrain	2–0	4–0	2012 Arab Nations Cup
2	29 June 2012	Prince Abdullah al-Faisal Stadium, Jeddah (N)	Yemen	1–0	4–0	2012 Arab Nations Cup
3	29 June 2012	Prince Abdullah al-Faisal Stadium, Jeddah (N)	Yemen	2–0	4–0	2012 Arab Nations Cup
4	29 June 2012	Prince Abdullah al-Faisal Stadium, Jeddah (N)	Yemen	3–0	4–0	2012 Arab Nations Cup
5	29 June 2012	Prince Abdullah al-Faisal Stadium, Jeddah (N)	Yemen	4–0	4–0	2012 Arab Nations Cup
6	3 July 2012	Prince Abdullah al-Faisal Stadium, Jeddah (N)	Iraq	2–0	2–1	2012 Arab Nations Cup
7	15 August 2012	Prince Moulay Abdellah Stadium, Rabat (N)	Guinea	2–0	2–1	Friendly match

== Honours ==
Raja Casablanca

- Botola Pro: 2010-11, 2012-13
- Moroccan Throne Cup: 2012
- FIFA Club World Cup runner-up: 2013

Kuwait SC

- Kuwait Emir Cup: 2016

Morocco A'

- FIFA Arab Cup: 2012

Individual

- FIFA Arab Cup Best Player: 2012
- FIFA Arab Cup Top Goalscorer: 2012
