= Ahmed Al Rashidi =

Kuwaiti footballer

Personal information
- Full name: Ahmed Saad Al Rashidi (Arabic:أحمد سعد الرشيدي)
- Date of birth: 18 June 1984 (age 42)
- Place of birth: Kuwait
- Height: 1.82 m (6 ft 0 in)
- Position: Centre back

Youth career
- 1996–2001: Al-Shabab

Senior career*
Years	Team	Apps	(Gls)
2001–2007	Al-Shabab	41	(5)
2007	→Al Tadamon (loan)	? ?	
2007–2015	Al-Arabi	124	(5)
2013–2015	→Al Naser (loan)	21	(1)

International career^{‡}
2010–2014	Kuwait	12	(1)
- * Club domestic league appearances and goals as of 25 July 2014 ‡ National team caps and goals as of 22 Jan 2014

Ahmed Saad Al Rashidi (born 18 June 1984) is a former Kuwaiti footballer.

== International goals ==
#	Date	Venue	Opponent	Score	Result	Competition
?	1 October 2010	Amman	Yemen	1–1	Draw	2010 West Asian Football Federation Championship
