= Faisal Al Badri =

Libyan footballer (born 1990)

Personal information
- Full name: Faisal Saleh Al-Badri
- Date of birth: 4 June 1990 (age 36)
- Place of birth: Benghazi, Great Socialist People's Libyan Arab Jamahiriya
- Height: 1.86 m (6 ft 1 in)
- Position: Midfielder

Team information
- Current team: Al-Hilal SC

Senior career*
Years	Team	Apps	(Gls)
2009–2011	Al-Hilal SC		
2011–2015	Al-Ahly Benghazi		
2016–2018	Al-Hilal SC		
2018–2020	Al-Ittihad SCSC		
2021–	Al-Hilal SC		

International career^{‡}
2011–	Libya	72	(14)
Medal record
Men's football
Representing Libya
Arab Cup
Runner-up	2012 Saudi Arabia
African Nations Championship
Winner	2014 South Africa
- * Club domestic league appearances and goals as of 17:43, 14 June 2013 (UTC) ‡ National team caps and goals as of 10 September 2024

Faisal Saleh Al-Badri (Arabic: فَيْصَل صَالِح الْبَدرِيّ; born 4 June 1990) is a Libyan professional footballer as a midfielder for Libyan Premier League club Al-Hilal SC and the Libya national team.

== International ==
=== International goals ===
Scores and results list Libya's goal tally first.

No	Date	Venue	Opponent	Score	Result	Competition
1.	6 July 2012	Prince Abdullah Al-Faisal Sports City, Jeddah, Saudi Arabia	Morocco	1–1	1–1 (1–3 p)	2012 Arab Nations Cup
2.	26 August 2012	Terrain El Mouradi Hammam Bourguiba, Aïn Draham, Tunisia	Sudan	?	3–0	Friendly
3.	1 June 2013	June 11 Stadium, Tripoli, Libya	Uganda	3–0	3–0	Friendly
4.	14 June 2013	Juna 11 Stadium, Tripoli, Libya	Togo	1–0	2–0	2014 FIFA World Cup qualification
5.	15 November 2013	Sousse Olympic Stadium, Sousse, Tunisia	Niger	1–1	1–1	Friendly
6.	18 November 2013	Stade Olympique de Sousse, Sousse, Tunisia	Benin	1–0	1–0	Friendly
7.	17 January 2014	Free State Stadium, Bloemfontein, South Africa	Ghana	1–1	1–1	2014 African Nations Championship
8.	13 November 2015	Stade Olympique, Sousse, Tunisia	Rwanda	1–0	1–0	2018 FIFA World Cup qualification
9.	23 March 2016	Estádio Nacional 12 de Julho, São Tomé, São Tomé and Príncipe	São Tomé and Príncipe	1–0	1–2	2017 Africa Cup of Nations qualification
10.	25 December 2017	King Abdullah II Stadium, Amman, Jordan	Jordan	1–1	1–1	Friendly
11.	11 November 2023	Martyrs of February Stadium, Benina, Libya	Sudan	1–0	2–1	Friendly
12.	22 March 2024	Père Jégo Stadium, Casablanca, Morocco	Burkina Faso	1–0	2–1	Friendly
13.	6 June 2024	Martyrs of February Stadium, Benina, Libya	Mauritius	1–0	2–1	2026 FIFA World Cup qualification
14.	10 September 2024	Felix Houphouet Boigny Stadium, Abidjan, Ivory Coast	Benin	1–0	1–2	2025 Africa Cup of Nations qualification

== Honours ==
Libya

- Arab Cup: runner-up, 2012
- African Nations Championship: 2014
