= Mustapha Mrani =

Moroccan footballer (born 1978)

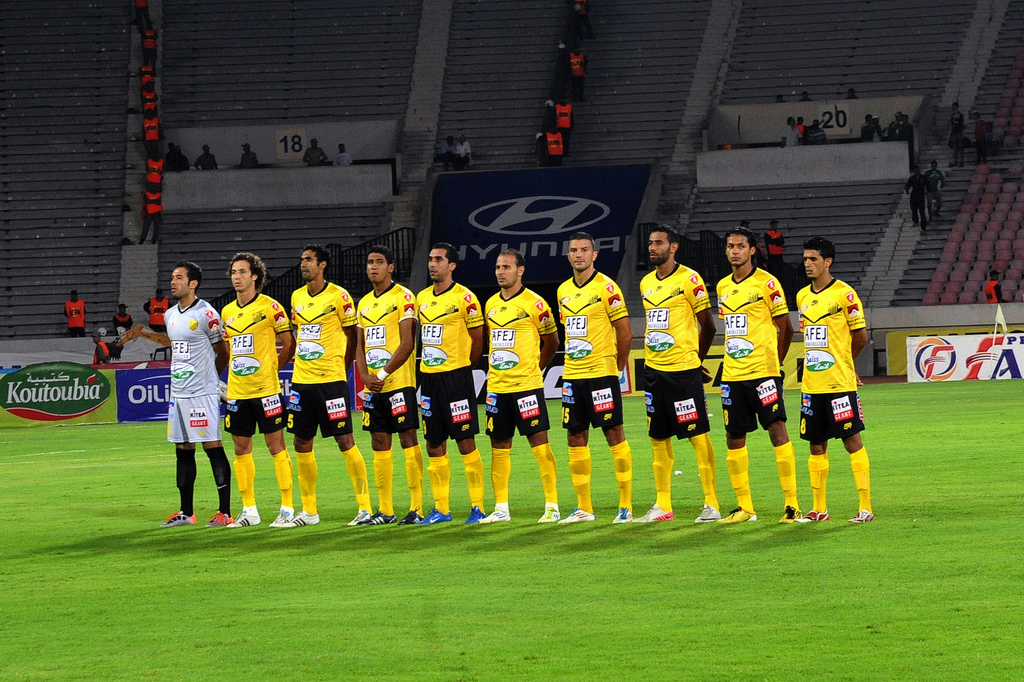

Mustapha Mrani (born 2 March 1978) is a Moroccan former footballer who played as a defender for MAS Fez. He was part of the Morocco national team at the 2012 Africa Cup of Nations.
