= Abdessalam Benjelloun =

Moroccan footballer (born 1985)

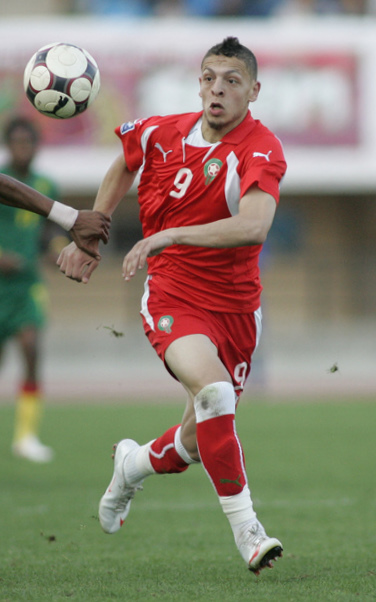
- Benjelloun playing for Morocco in 2009

Personal information
- Date of birth: 28 January 1985 (age 41)
- Place of birth: Fes, Morocco
- Height: 1.85 m (6 ft 1 in)
- Position: Forward

Youth career
- –2003: Wydad Fez

Senior career*
Years	Team	Apps	(Gls)
2003–2006	MAS Fez		
2006–2010	Hibernian	81	(11)
2008–2009	→ Charleroi (loan)	8	(1)
2009	→ Roeselare (loan)	14	(6)
2010–2011	Ismaily SC	7	(0)
2011	Raja CA	0	(0)
2011–2012	Wydad Fez	17	(6)
2012–2013	FUS Rabat	24	(9)
2013–2015	AS FAR	40	(7)
2015–2017	FUS Rabat	47	(8)
2017–2018	KAC Marrakech	21	(0)
2018–2019	Wydad Fez		
2019–2020	Raja Beni Mellal	11	(2)

International career
2004–2008	Morocco U23	6	(3)
2008–2016	Morocco	21	(5)

Managerial career
- 2024-: WS Temara
- * Club domestic league appearances and goals

Abdessalam Benjelloun (Arabic: عبد السلام بن جلون, romanized: ʿAbd as-Salām bin Jallūn; born 28 January 1985) is a Moroccan professional football manager and former player who plays as a forward.

Benjelloun started his career in his native Morocco, before moving to Scottish Premier League club Hibernian in 2006. Benjelloun had some success at Hibs, scoring twice in the 2007 Scottish League Cup Final win, but was twice loaned to Belgian clubs afterwards before being released at the end of his contract in 2010. Benjelloun then signed for Egyptian Premier League club Ismaily SC, but returned to his native Morocco in January 2011. At the international level, he represented the Morocco national team.

== Club career ==
=== Hibernian ===
Benjelloun was born in Fes. He trained with Hibernian for several weeks during the early part of 2006, while Hibs assessed whether to sign him from his hometown club Maghreb Fez. Hibs then had to undertake the complex process of obtaining the documentation needed to sign him. During this time, rumours grew on Hibs-related internet sites that Hibs had unearthed a major talent, so expectations were high when Benjelloun's signing was formally announced in March 2006.

He made his debut for Hibernian in the 2006 Scottish Cup semi-final loss to local rivals Hearts on 2 April 2006. Manager Tony Mowbray was forced to play Benjelloun in that game because of injury (Chris Killen), suspension (Derek Riordan), cup transfer rules (Paul Dalglish) and the sale of Garry O'Connor.

Benjelloun demonstrated his potential in the Edinburgh derby on 22 April 2006, when he came off the bench to score the winning goal. 'Benji' became an instant hero with the Hibernian supporters, although his goal celebration caused some controversy. He ran wildly towards the Hearts supporters, having scored the goal at the other end of the ground. Fortunately the Hibs goalkeeper, Zibi Małkowski, managed to prevent Benji from reaching the Hearts supporters, or a major incident could have ensued.

A fellow Moroccan, Merouane Zemmama, was signed by Hibs at the start of the 2006–07 season. It was thought that this should help Benji to settle into Scottish football, and he rewarded Hibs with two goals in the 2007 Scottish League Cup Final victory against Kilmarnock. Benjelloun was then expected to feature prominently during the 2007–08 season, but he suffered a season plagued by injuries, scoring only one goal in competitive matches. He was the subject of interest from Belgian First Division A clubs. Anderlecht were reported to be watching him and Westerlo had an offer rejected in July 2008.

After Benjelloun completed two loan spells during the 2008–09 season, new Hibernian manager John Hughes claimed that Benjelloun still had a future at the club. On 20 July 2009, Egyptian Premier League club Al Ahly claimed that they had signed Benjelloun on a three-year contract, but the deal was cancelled days later. Benjelloun eventually returned to training with Hibs in early August, and he scored the winning goal in their first game of the 2009–10 season. He held down a regular place in the side playing as a second striker during the next few months, but struggled for first team action after this and was released at the end of the season. At the last game of the season, Benji was shown to be in tears, perhaps anticipating his release.

=== Charleroi ===
Hibs agreed to loan Benji to Charleroi in August 2008 on a season long loan, with the Belgian side having the option to purchase the player outright. The deal was confirmed that day on the official site of Charleroi, with Benjelloun pictured in his new side's colours. Despite scoring on his debut against Roeselare, Benji failed to hold down a regular spot and made only eight appearances during his loan spell. The Scotsman newspaper reported on 2 January 2009 that Benjelloun had "endured" a difficult spell in Belgium due to injuries. Charleroi decided not to exercise their option to sign Benjelloun, which meant that he returned to Hibs. Benjelloun later commented that he had experienced personal problems during his time with Charleroi.

=== Roeselare ===
Sharjah-based club Al Shaab reached an agreement in principle to sign Benjelloun, but could not conclude a deal with Hibs. Towards the end of the transfer window, Benjelloun signed on loan for another Belgian First Division A club, Roeselare, until the end of the season. Benjelloun scored five goals in the first five of Roselare's last six matches as they retained their league status in relegation play-offs. He was withdrawn injured in their penultimate match and missed their final match.

=== Ismaily ===
After his release by Hibs in May 2010, Benjelloun agreed a two-year contract with German 2. Bundesliga club Greuther Fürth. He did not complete the move, however, with the club claiming that he had demanded too much money. Soon afterwards, Benjelloun signed for Egyptian Premier League club Ismaily SC. He made only seven appearances before leaving the club in January 2011.

=== Return to Morocco ===
Benjelloun then had a short spell with Raja Casablanca. He signed for his first club Wydad de Fès, later in 2011. He then moved to FUS Rabat and was recalled to the Moroccan national team in the 2011–12 season.

== International career ==
Benjelloun was first selected by Morocco during the 2007–08 season. He scored on his international debut, in a 4–1 win against Belgium in Brussels. He was then selected for the 2010 World Cup qualifiers at the end of the season. Benjelloun scored in the first two matches, against Ethiopia and Mauritania.

== Career statistics ==
=== Club ===
As of 06:39, 10 May 2010 (UTC)

Appearances and goals by club, season and competition
Club	Season	League		National cup		League cup		Europe		Total	
Club	Season	Apps	Goals	Apps	Goals	Apps	Goals	Apps	Goals	Apps	Goals
Hibernian	2005–06	5	1	1	0	0	0	0	0	6	1
Hibernian	2006–07	33	6	6	3	5	5	1	0	45	14
Hibernian	2007–08	15	1	2	0	1	0	0	0	18	1
Hibernian	2009–10	28	3	4	1	1	0	0	0	33	4
Charleroi (loan)	2008–09	8	1	0	0	0	0	0	0	8	1
Roeselare (loan)	2008–09	14	6	0	0	0	0	0	0	14	6
Total		103	18	13	4	7	5	1	0	124	27

=== International ===
Scores and results list Morocco's goal tally first, score column indicates score after each Benjelloun goal.

List of international goals scored by Abdessalam Benjelloun
No.	Date	Venue	Opponent	Score	Result	Competition
1	26 March 2008	King Baudouin Stadium, Brussels, Belgium	Belgium	4–1	4–1	Friendly
2	31 May 2008	Stade Mohamed V, Casablanca, Morocco	Ethiopia	1–0	3–0	2010 FIFA World Cup qualification
3	7 June 2008	Stade Olympique, Nouakchott, Mauritania	Mauritania	2–0	4–1	2010 FIFA World Cup qualification
4	23 June 2012	Prince Abdullah al-Faisal Stadium, Jeddah, Saudi Arabia	Bahrain	4–0	4–0	2012 Arab Nations Cup
5	22 October 2015	Stade Olympique de Radès, Radès, Tunisia	Libya	1–0	4–0	2016 African Nations Championship qualification
