= Brahim El Bahri =

Moroccan football midfielder

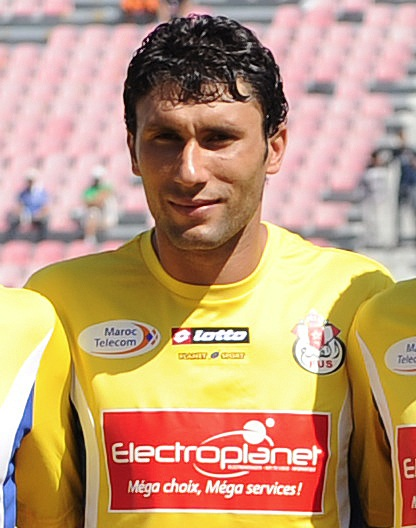
- Brahim El Bahri with Fath Rabat, September 2012

Personal information
- Full name: Brahim El Bahri
- Date of birth: March 26, 1986 (age 40)
- Place of birth: Taounate, Morocco
- Height: 1.86 m (6 ft 1 in)
- Position: Midfielder

Team information
- Current team: CR Khemis Zemamra

Youth career
- –2006: FAR Rabat

Senior career*
Years	Team	Apps	(Gls)
2006–2007	FAR Rabat		
2007–2011	Le Mans	18	(0)
2009–2010	→ FC Istres (loan)	30	(4)
2011–2014	FUS Rabat	55	(16)
2014–2015	Sfaxiens	25	(5)
2015–2016	Wydad Casablanca	2	(0)
2016–2017	FAR Rabat	2	(0)
2017	FUS Rabat	9	(3)
2018–2019	CR Al Hoceima	20	(2)
2019–	CR Khemis Zemamra	0	(0)

International career^{‡}
2008–2014	Morocco	14	(3)
- * Club domestic league appearances and goals as of 12 July 2009 ‡ National team caps and goals as of 13:01, 22 July 2019 (UTC)

Brahim El Bahri (born March 26, 1986, in Taounate, Morocco) is a Moroccan football midfielder. He currently plays for CR Khemis Zemamra.

== Career ==
El Bahri began his career by FAR Rabat was 2006 promoted to first team played here between June 2007, joined than to French Ligue 1 side Le Mans UC 72, who has played 14 games for the reserve team and in January 2008 was promoted to Le Mans.

On 28 January 2009, Le Mans has the 22-year-old Moroccan national team player El Bahri, until the end of the season to give FC Istres.

After playing four years in France, El Bahri returned to Morocco to play for hometown side FUS Rabat in 2011.

== International ==
He made his first cap for Morocco in the 2010 FIFA World Cup qualification match against Mauritania on 7 June 2008.

=== International goals ===
Scores and results list Morocco's goal tally first.

No	Date	Venue	Opponent	Score	Result	Competition
1.	23 June 2012	Prince Abdullah Al Faisal Stadium, Jeddah, Saudi Arabia	Bahrain	1–0	4–0	2012 Arab Nations Cup
2.	6 July 2012	Prince Abdullah Al Faisal Stadium, Jeddah, Saudi Arabia	Libya	1–0	1–1 (3–1 pen.)	2012 Arab Nations Cup
3.	16 January 2014	Athlone Stadium, Cape Town, South Africa	Burkina Faso	1–0	1–1	2014 African Nations Championship
