= 2012 Arab Cup =

9th Arab Cup, held in Saudi Arabia

Tournament details
- Host country: Saudi Arabia
- Dates: 22 June – 6 July
- Teams: 11 (from 2 confederations)
- Venues: 2 (in 2 host cities)

Final positions
- Champions: Morocco (1st title)
- Runners-up: Libya
- Third place: Iraq
- Fourth place: Saudi Arabia

Tournament statistics
- Matches played: 19
- Goals scored: 47 (2.47 per match)
- Top scorer(s): (Morocco) Yassine Salhi (6 goals)
- Best player: (Morocco) Yassine Salhi

The 2012 Arab Cup (Arabic: كأس العرب 2012) was the ninth edition of the Arab Cup for national football teams affiliated with the Union of Arab Football Associations (UAFA).

The tournament was hosted by Saudi Arabia between 22 June and 6 July 2012. It is the second time that the nation has hosted the tournament, the first being in 1985. This edition witnessed the return of Iraq – the most successful team and record holder of the Arab Cup with four titles – after a 24-year absence due to the Gulf War.

== Prize money ==
The tournament's lead sponsor was Singaporean company World Sport Group who describe themselves as "Asia's leading sports marketing, media and event management company."

The winner received US$1million, the runner-up received $600,000, the third-placed team received $300,000, while the other participating football associations received $200,000 each.

== Teams ==
=== Participating ===
Country	Confederation	Previous appearances in tournament
Bahrain	AFC	4 (1966, 1985, 1988, 2002)
Egypt (Note: Under-23 Olympic Team was representing Country)	CAF	3 (1988, 1992, 1998)
Iraq	AFC	4 (1964, 1966, 1985, 1988)
Kuwait	AFC	7 (1963, 1964, 1966, 1988, 1992, 1998, 2002)
Lebanon	AFC	6 (1963, 1964, 1966, 1988, 1998, 2002)
Libya	CAF	3 (1964, 1966, 1998)
Morocco (Note: Local Team was representing Country)	CAF	2 (1998, 2002)
Palestine	AFC	3 (1966, 1992, 2002)
Saudi Arabia	AFC	5 (1985, 1988, 1992, 1998, 2002)
Sudan	CAF	2 (1998, 2002)
Yemen	AFC	2 (1966, 2002)

=== Did not enter ===
Africa

- Algeria
- Comoros
- Djibouti
- Mauritania
- Somalia
- Tunisia

Asia

- Jordan
- Oman
- Qatar
- Syria
- United Arab Emirates

== Draw ==
The official draw was held on 6 May 2012 in Jeddah, Saudi Arabia. The remaining 11 teams were ranked based on the FIFA World Rankings of May 2012 before the draw.

Seeding pots	Nation	FIFA Ranking^{as of May 2012}
Pot A	Saudi Arabia	89
Pot A	Libya	39
Pot A	Egypt	55
Pot B	Morocco	62
Pot B	Iraq	70
Pot B	Kuwait	87
Pot C	Bahrain	93
Pot C	Sudan	113
Pot C	United Arab Emirates	121
Pot D	Lebanon	128
Pot D	Palestine	153
Pot D	Yemen	156

The United Arab Emirates withdrew from the competition after the group draw had been made; they were initially drawn into group A.

It will be played as tournament with three groups made of four teams each. The organizer country, Saudi Arabia was assigned to Group A.

== Venues ==
Jeddah	2012 Arab Cup is located in Saudi Arabia	Ta’if
Prince Abdullah al-Faisal Stadium	2012 Arab Cup is located in Saudi Arabia	King Fahd Stadium
Capacity: 20,000	2012 Arab Cup is located in Saudi Arabia	Capacity: 17,000

== Match officials ==
The following referees were chosen for the 2012 Arab Cup.

=== Referees ===
- (Algeria) Djamel Haimoudi
- (Bahrain) Nawaf Shukralla
- (Egypt) Mahmoud Ashour
- (Egypt) Gehad Grisha
- (Jordan) Suleiman Dalqam
- (Morocco) Redouane Jiyed
- (Qatar) Abdullah Al-Baloushi
- (Saudi Arabia) Abdulrahman Al-Amri
- (Sudan) Khalid Abdel Rahman
- (Tunisia) Selim Jedidi
- (United Arab Emirates) Hamad Al-Shaikh Hashmi

=== Assistant referees ===
- (Algeria) Abdelhak Etchiali
- (Bahrain) Aziz Ali Hasan Al-Wadi
- (Egypt) Ayman Dagesh
- (Egypt) Sherif Saleh
- (Jordan) Ahmad Al-Ruwaili
- (Libya) Fouad Al-Maghribi
- (Morocco) Bouazza Rouani
- (Qatar) Ramzan Al-Nuaimi
- (Saudi Arabia) Abdulaziz Al-Asmari
- (Sudan) Waleed Ali Ahmad
- (Tunisia) Bechir Hassani
- (United Arab Emirates) Ahmed Mohammed Saeed Al-Shamisi
- (Yemen) Ahmed Qaid Saif

== Group stage ==
=== Group A ===
Team	Pld	W	D	L	GF	GA	GD	Pts
Saudi Arabia	2	1	1	0	6	2	+4	4
Kuwait	2	1	0	1	2	4	−2	3
Palestine	2	0	1	1	2	4	−2	1

22 June 2012
19:45

Saudi Arabia	4–0	Kuwait
Al-Sahlawi 22', 90+3'; Al-Mehyani 51', 56'	Report

King Fahd Stadium
Referee: Gehad Grisha (Egypt)

25 June 2012
19:45

Kuwait	2–0	Palestine
Khamis 27'; Al-Rashidi 90+2'

King Fahd Stadium
Referee: Hamad Al-Sheikh (United Arab Emirates)

28 June 2012
19:45

Saudi Arabia	2–2	Palestine
Al-Ruwaili 9'; Al-Zylaeei 85'	Report	Abu Saleh 45+1' (pen.); Al Amour 73'

King Fahd Stadium
Referee: Khalid Abdel Rahman (Sudan)

=== Group B ===
Team	Pld	W	D	L	GF	GA	GD	Pts
Morocco A'	3	2	1	0	8	0	+8	7
Libya	3	2	1	0	5	2	+3	7
Yemen	3	1	0	2	3	7	−4	3
Bahrain	3	0	0	3	1	8	−7	0

23 June 2012
18:15

Morocco A'	4–0	Bahrain
El Bahri 17'; Salhi 78'; Al-Hayam 83' (o.g.); Benjelloun 90+'

Prince Abdullah al-Faisal Stadium
Referee: Abdullah Al-Balooshi (Qatar)
23 June 2012
21:00

Libya	3–1	Yemen
Saad 17' (pen.); Salama 53'; Al-Ghuwail 89'		Al-Sasi 69'

Prince Abdullah al-Faisal Stadium
Referee: Suleiman Jaber (Jordan)

26 June 2012
18:15

Bahrain	0–2	Yemen
		Al-Selwi 53' (pen.); Baroies 65'

Prince Abdullah al-Faisal Stadium
Referee: Selim Jedidi (Tunisia)
26 June 2012
21:00

Libya	0–0	Morocco A'

Prince Abdullah al-Faisal Stadium
Referee: Djamel Haimoudi (Algeria)

29 June 2012
19:45

Libya	2–1	Bahrain
Saad 71' (pen.); Al Ghanodi 74'		Al-Khataal 38'

King Fahd Stadium
Referee: Hamad Al-Sheikh (UAE)
29 June 2012
19:45

Yemen	0–4	Morocco A'
		Salhi 10' (pen.), 48', 58', 63' (pen.)

Prince Abdullah al-Faisal Stadium
Referee: Abdulrahman Al-Amri (Saudi Arabia)

=== Group C ===
Team	Pld	W	D	L	GF	GA	GD	Pts
Iraq	3	2	1	0	4	2	+2	7
Sudan	3	1	2	0	4	2	+2	5
Egypt U23	3	0	2	1	3	4	−1	2
Lebanon	3	0	1	2	1	4	−3	1

24 June 2012
18:15

Iraq	1–0	Lebanon
Karim 89'

Prince Abdullah al-Faisal Stadium
Referee: Rédouane Jiyed (Morocco)
24 June 2012
21:00

Egypt U23	1–1	Sudan
Magdi 38'		Elamin 80'

Prince Abdullah al-Faisal Stadium
Referee: Abdulrahman Al-Amri (Saudi Arabia)

27 June 2012
18:15

Lebanon	0–2	Sudan
		Ankba 55'; Bashir 83'

Prince Abdullah al-Faisal Stadium
Referee: Suleiman Jaber (Jordan)
27 June 2012
21:00

Iraq	2–1	Egypt U23
Karim 49'; Abdul-Zahra 75'		Gomaa 45' (pen.)

Prince Abdullah al-Faisal Stadium
Referee: Abdullah Al-Balooshi (Qatar)

30 June 2012
19:45

Egypt U23	1–1	Lebanon
Hamoudi 45+1' (pen.)		Moghrabi 80'

King Fahd Stadium
Referee: Rédouane Jiyed (Morocco)
30 June 2012
19:45

Sudan	1–1	Iraq
Ahmed 9'		Shakir 5'

Prince Abdullah al-Faisal Stadium
Referee: Selim Jedidi (Tunisia)

=== Best placed runner-up ===
The team that finish highest of all group runners-up will also proceed to the semi-final stage. Due to Group A only having three teams in their group, results against teams finishing fourth will not be counted. The best runners-up will face the winner of group A in the semifinals while the winner of group B will face the winner of group C.

Team	Pld	W	D	L	GF	GA	GD	Pts
Libya	2	1	1	0	3	1	+2	4
Kuwait	2	1	0	1	2	4	−2	3
Sudan	2	0	2	0	2	2	0	2

== Knockout phase ==
The semi-final winners proceed to the final and those who lost compete in the third place playoff.

Semi-finals
3 July – Jeddah
Saudi Arabia	0
Libya	2
3 July – Jeddah
Morocco A'	2
Iraq	1

Final
6 July – Jeddah
Libya	1 (1)
Morocco A' (pen.)	1 (3)
Third place
5 July – Jeddah
Saudi Arabia	0
Iraq	1

=== Semi-finals ===
3 July 2012
18:15

Saudi Arabia	0–2	Libya
		Al-Sebaee 75'; Saad 90+6' (pen.)

Prince Abdullah al-Faisal Stadium
Referee: Gehad Grisha (Egypt)

3 July 2012
21:30

Morocco A'	2–1	Iraq
El Gharib 23'; Salhi 28'		Karim 90+6' (pen.)

Prince Abdullah al-Faisal Stadium
Referee: Djamel Haimoudi (Algeria)

=== Third place play-off ===
5 July 2012
21:00

Saudi Arabia	0–1	Iraq
	Report	Abdul-Zahra 16'

Prince Abdullah al-Faisal Stadium
Referee: Khalid Abdurrahman (Sudan)

=== Final ===
6 July 2012
21:00

Libya	1–1 (a.e.t.)	Morocco A'
Al Badri 89'		El Bahri 5'
Penalties
Al Badri (penalty scored); Salama (penalty missed); Al-Sbaai (penalty missed); Al Ghanodi (penalty missed)	1–3	(penalty scored) Salhi; (penalty scored) Jahouh; (penalty missed) Abdessamad; (penalty missed) Gadoum; (penalty scored) Belmaalem

Prince Abdullah al-Faisal Stadium
Attendance: 2,500
Referee: Selim Jedidi (Tunisia)

== Winners ==
2012 Arab Cup champions

Morocco
First title

== Statistics ==
=== Goalscorers ===
There were 47 goals scored in 19 matches, for an average of 2.47 goals per match.

6 goals

- (Morocco) Yassine Salhi

3 goals

- (Iraq) Mustafa Karim
- (Libya) Ahmed Saad

2 goals

- (Iraq) Alaa Abdul-Zahra
- (Morocco) Brahim El Bahri
- (Saudi Arabia) Essa Al-Mehyani
- (Saudi Arabia) Mohammad Al-Sahlawi

1 goal

- (Bahrain) Ahmed Al-Khataal
- (Egypt) Saleh Gomaa
- (Egypt) Ahmed Hamoudi
- (Egypt) Ahmed Magdi
- (Iraq) Salam Shakir
- (Kuwait) Ahmad Al-Rashidi
- (Kuwait) Abdulhadi Khamis
- (Lebanon) Akram Moghrabi
- (Libya) Faisal Al Badri
- (Libya) Mohammed Al-Ghannoudi
- (Libya) Mohammad Al-Ghuwail
- (Libya) Ali Salama
- (Morocco) Abdessalam Benjelloun
- (Morocco) Oussama El Gharib
- (Palestine) Hussam Abu Saleh
- (Palestine) Ismail Al Amour
- (Saudi Arabia) Khaled Al-Zylaeei
- (Saudi Arabia) Abdulmajeed Al-Ruwaili
- (Sudan) Mohamed Abd Al Momen Ankba
- (Sudan) Mowaia Bashir
- (Sudan) Moawya El-Amin
- (Sudan) Ahmed Adil Hamad
- (Yemen) Ala Al-Sasi
- (Yemen) Akram Al-Worafi
- (Yemen) Mohammed Baroies

=== Awards ===
- (Morocco) Yassine Salhi – was named the player of the tournament, and was the top scorer of the tournament with a total of 6 goals.

=== Team statistics ===
Pos.	Team	Pld	W	D	L	Pts	GF	GA	GD
1	Morocco A'	5	3	2	0	11	11	2	+9
2	Libya	5	3	2	0	11	8	3	+5
3	Iraq	5	3	1	1	10	6	4	+2
4	Saudi Arabia	4	1	1	2	4	6	5	+1
**Eliminated in the group stage**
5	Kuwait	2	1	0	1	3	2	4	−2
6	Sudan	3	1	2	0	5	4	2	+2
7	Yemen	3	1	0	2	3	3	7	−4
8	Egypt U23	3	0	2	1	2	3	4	−1
9	Palestine	2	0	1	1	1	2	4	−2
10	Lebanon	3	0	1	2	1	1	4	−3
11	Bahrain	3	0	0	3	0	1	8	−7
Total		19^{(1)}	13	6^{(2)}	13	51	47	47	0

Team(s) rendered in italics represent(s) the host nation(s). The competition's winning team is rendered in bold.
^{(1)} – Total games lost not counted in total games played (total games lost = total games won)
^{(2)} – Total number of games drawn (tied) for all teams = Total number of games drawn (tied) ÷ 2 (both teams involved)

== Media ==
=== Broadcasting ===
Territory	Channel
Qatar	BeIN Sports
Saudi Arabia	Al-Riyadiah
