= FIFA Arab Cup =

Association football competition for men's national teams in the Arab world

- Organiser(s): UAFA (1983–2012); FIFA (2021–present)
- Founded: 1963; 63 years ago
- Region: Arab world
- Teams: 16
- Current champions: Morocco (2nd title)
- Most championships: Iraq (4 titles)
- Website: fifa.com/arabcup
- Editions: 1963; 1964; 1966; 1985; 1988; 1992; 1998; 2002; 2009; 2012; 2021; 2025; 2029; 2033
- 2025 FIFA Arab Cup

The FIFA Arab Cup (Arabic: كأس العرب, romanized: Kaʾs al-ʿArab), formerly and simply known as the Arab Cup, is an international football competition for men's national teams organized by FIFA since 2021, and previously organized by UAFA, the governing body for football in the Arab world. The tournament is contested by 16 participating national teams and is held every four years with the participation of members affiliated with the UAFA, comprising the member states of the Arab League from Asia and Africa.

The current champion is Morocco, winning its second title in Qatar 2025. The Arab Cup's inaugural edition was held in Lebanon 1963, Tunisia was the first champion. After the 1964 and 1966 editions, the tournament was halted for almost 20 years, before returning in 1985. It was held five more times until 2012, which was the last edition organized by the UAFA. The 2021 edition was the first organized by FIFA.

The eleven Arab Cup tournaments have been won by six national teams. Iraq has won four times, Saudi Arabia and Morocco have each won twice, and Algeria, Egypt, and Tunisia have each won once. Qatar has hosted the Arab Cup three times, Kuwait and Saudi Arabia have each hosted twice, and Lebanon, Iraq, Jordan and Syria have each hosted once.

== History ==
The initial idea to establish an Arab Cup came in 1957 from Lebanese journalist Nassif Majdalani and the Secretary General of the Lebanese Football Association (LFA) Izzat Al Turk. In November 1962, the LFA called for the formal establishment of the tournament through their president Georges Dabbas, who organised a general Arab assembly for the formation of the Arab Cup. The first Arab Cup was held in Beirut in April 1963, with the participation of five teams.

During the 17-year hiatus between 1966 and 1983, the Arab Cup was de facto replaced by the Palestine Cup, which was held three times in the 1970s and then became a youth tournament.

In the 1980s, the competition returned under the auspices of the Union of Arab Football Associations (UAFA). The 1992 Arab Cup was also organised as part of the 1992 Arab Games.

The 2021 edition was the first edition to be organised by FIFA; the competition was renamed FIFA Arab Cup. Following the 2021 final, in which Algeria defeated Tunisia 2–0 to win the tournament, FIFA President Gianni Infantino announced that FIFA would continue to oversee future editions. On 15 May 2024, FIFA announced that Qatar would host the tournament in 2025, 2029 and 2033, and the tournament would follow the principle of an invitational competition not included in the International Match Calendar.

The 2025 edition became the first Arab Cup tournament to surpass one million spectators, reaching a total attendance of 1,236,600. Its final, held at Lusail Stadium, drew a record-breaking attendance of 84,517 spectators as Morocco defeated Jordan 3–2 to claim the title.

== Results ==
Keys

- a.e.t.: after extra time
- p: penalty shoot-out
- awd: awarded result.
- TBD: to be determined.

Ed.	Year	Host	First place game			Third place game			Teams
Ed.	Year	Host	(gold) Champions	Score	(silver) Runners-up	(bronze) Third place	Score	Fourth place	Teams
Arab Cup
1	1963	Lebanon	Tunisia	(Note: A round-robin tournament determined the final standings.)	Syria	Lebanon		Kuwait	5
2	1964	Kuwait	Iraq		Libya	Lebanon		Kuwait	5
3	1966	Iraq	Iraq	2–1	Syria	Libya	6–1	Lebanon	10
Arab Cup (UAFA) (Note: From 1983 to 2012, the competition was under the auspices of UAFA.)
4	1985	Saudi Arabia	Iraq	1–0	Bahrain	Saudi Arabia	0–0 (a.e.t.) (4–1 p)	Qatar	6
5	1988	Jordan	Iraq	1–1 (a.e.t.) (4–3 p)	Syria	Egypt	2–0	Jordan	10
6	1992 (Note: The 1992 edition organized as part of the 1992 Arab Games football tournament was also counted as part of the Arab Cup.)	Syria	Egypt	3–2	Saudi Arabia	Kuwait	2–1	Syria	6
7	1998	Qatar	Saudi Arabia	3–1	Qatar	Kuwait	4–1	United Arab Emirates	12
8	2002	Kuwait	Saudi Arabia	1–0 (a.e.t.)	Bahrain	Jordan and Morocco (Note: No third place match was played.)			10
–	2009	Edition cancelled during qualification due to lack of sponsorship							
9	2012	Saudi Arabia	Morocco	1–1 (a.e.t.) (3–1 p)	Libya	Iraq	1–0	Saudi Arabia	11
FIFA Arab Cup
10	2021	Qatar	Algeria	2–0 (a.e.t.)	Tunisia	Qatar	0–0 (a.e.t.) (5–4 p)	Egypt	16
11	2025	Qatar	Morocco	3–2 (a.e.t.)	Jordan	Saudi Arabia and United Arab Emirates (Note: Match was abandoned at half-time due to adverse weather, which resulted in FIFA declaring the final result as 0–0 and third place being shared between both Saudi Arabia and the UAE.)			16
12	2029	Qatar	TBD			TBD			TBD
13	2033	Qatar	TBD			TBD			TBD

== Performances ==
=== By nation ===
Teams reaching the top four
Team	Winners	Runners-up	Third place	Fourth place	Total
Iraq	4 (1964, 1966*, 1985, 1988)	—	1 (2012)	—	5
Saudi Arabia	2 (1998, 2002)	1 (1992)	2 (1985*, 2025) (Note: Third place match in 2025 was abandoned due to adverse weather, which resulted in FIFA declaring third place to be shared between both Saudi Arabia and the UAE.)	1 (2012*)	6
Morocco	2 (2012, 2025)	—	1 (2002) (Note: There was no third place match in the 2002 Arab Cup.)	—	3
Tunisia	1 (1963)	1 (2021)	—	—	2
Egypt	1 (1992)	—	1 (1988)	1 (2021)	3
Algeria	1 (2021)	—	—	—	1
Syria	—	3 (1963, 1966, 1988)	—	1 (1992*)	4
Libya	—	2 (1964, 2012)	1 (1966)	—	3
Bahrain	—	2 (1985, 2002)	—	—	2
Qatar	—	1 (1998*)	1 (2021*)	1 (1985)	3
Jordan	—	1 (2025)	1 (2002)	1 (1988*)	3
Kuwait	—	—	2 (1992, 1998)	2 (1963, 1964*)	4
Lebanon	—	—	2 (1963*, 1964)	1 (1966)	3
United Arab Emirates	—	—	1 (2025)	1 (1998)	2

* hosts

=== By confederation ===
Total times teams qualified by confederation
Confederation	AFC	CAF	Total
Teams	76	31	107
Top 4	32	12	44
Top 2	14	8	22
1st	6	5	11
2nd	8	3	11
3rd	10	3	13
4th	8	1	9

Champions by confederation
Confederation (continent)	Champion(s)	Titles
AFC (Asia)	Iraq (4), Saudi Arabia (2)	6
CAF (Africa)	Morocco (2), Algeria (1), Egypt (1), Tunisia (1)	5

== Records and statistics ==
=== Comprehensive team results by tournament ===
Legend

- 1st – Champions
- 2nd – Runners-up
- 3rd – Third place
- 4th – Fourth place
- QF – Quarter-finals
- GS – Group stage
- Q — Qualified for upcoming tournament
- • — Did not qualify
- × — Did not participate
- — Hosts

For each tournament, the number of teams in each finals tournament are shown (in parentheses).

Team	1963 (Lebanon) (5)	1964 (Kuwait) (5)	1966 (Iraq) (10)	1985 (Saudi Arabia) (6)	1988 (Jordan) (10)	1992 (Syria) (6)	1998 (Qatar) (12)	2002 (Kuwait) (10)	2012 (Saudi Arabia) (11)	2021 (Qatar) (16)	2025 (Qatar) (16)	2029 (Qatar) (16)	Total
Algeria	×	×	×	×	GS	×	GS	×	×	1st	QF		4
Bahrain	×	×	GS	2nd	GS	×	×	2nd	GS	GS	GS		7
Comoros				×	×	×	×	×	×	•	GS		1
Egypt	×	×	×	×	3rd	1st	GS	×	GS	4th	GS		6
Iraq	×	1st	1st	1st	1st	×	×	×	3rd	GS	QF		7
Jordan	GS	GS	GS	GS	4th	GS	GS	3rd	×	QF	2nd		10
Kuwait	4th	4th	GS	×	GS	3rd	3rd	GS	GS	•	GS		9
Lebanon	3rd	3rd	4th	×	GS	×	GS	GS	GS	GS	•		8
Libya	×	2nd	3rd	×	×	×	GS	×	2nd	•	•		4
Mauritania	×	×	×	GS	•	×	×	×	×	GS	•		2
Morocco	×	×	×	×	×	×	GS	3rd	1st	QF	1st		5
Oman	×	×	GS	×	×	×	×	×	×	QF	GS		3
Palestine	×	×	GS	×	×	GS	•	GS	GS	GS	QF		6
Qatar	×	×	×	4th	×	×	2nd	×	×	3rd	GS	Q	5
Saudi Arabia	×	×	×	3rd	GS	2nd	1st	1st	4th	GS	3rd		8
Sudan	×	×	×	•	×	×	GS	GS	GS	GS	GS		5
Syria	2nd	×	2nd	×	2nd	4th	GS	GS	×	GS	QF		8
Tunisia	1st	×	×	×	GS	×	×	×	×	2nd	GS		4
United Arab Emirates	×	×	×	×	×	×	4th	×	×	QF	3rd		3
Yemen	×	×	GS	×	×	×	×	GS	GS	•	•		3

== See also ==
- Palestine Cup of Nations
- Football at the Arab Games
- Arab Women's Cup
- Arab Club Champions Cup
- FIFA ASEAN Cup
