= 2009 African Nations Championship squads =

The 2009 African Nations Championship was an international football tournament held in the Ivory Coast from 22 February to 8 March 2009. The eight national teams involved in the tournament were required to register a squad of 23 players, including three goalkeepers. Unlike the Africa Cup of Nations, this tournament exclusively requires players to be registered to a club within their country to be eligible. Expatriate players, even if they play in Africa, cannot participate in the event.

Final squads were confirmed by the Confederation of African Football on 21 February. The age listed for each player is on 22 February 2009, the first day of the tournament.

== Group A ==
=== Ivory Coast ===
The squad of Ivory Coast, the host nation, was announced by head coach Georges Kouadio on 13 February 2009.

No.	Pos.	Player	Date of birth (age)	Caps	Club
1	GK	Abdoul Karim Cissé	20 October 1985 (aged 23)		(Ivory Coast) Issia Wazi
2	DF	Mansou Kouakou	10 May 1991 (aged 17)		(Ivory Coast) Stade d'Abidjan
3	DF	Konan Ruffin N'Gouan	15 May 1990 (aged 18)		(Ivory Coast) Africa Sports National
4	DF	Hervé Diomandé	17 June 1988 (aged 20)		(Ivory Coast) ASEC Mimosas
5	DF	Sylvestre Bi Tra	31 December 1983 (aged 25)		(Ivory Coast) Séwé Sports de San Pedro
6	DF	Florent Saouré	24 December 1983 (aged 25)		(Ivory Coast) Stade d'Abidjan
7	MF	Dieudonne Bohou	24 April 1985 (aged 23)		(Ivory Coast) Séwé Sports de San Pedro
8	MF	Kouko Guehi	17 November 1987 (aged 21)		(Ivory Coast) Séwé Sports de San Pedro
9	FW	Franck Guedegbe	4 February 1988 (aged 21)		(Ivory Coast) Entente Sportive de Bingerville
10	FW	Alassane Karamoko	18 May 1986 (aged 22)		(Ivory Coast) ASEC Mimosas
11	FW	Jacques Alain-Eliseé Tanoh	16 September 1987 (aged 21)		(Ivory Coast) Stella Club d'Adjamé
12	MF	Acihelou Krecoumou	22 February 1976 (aged 33)		(Ivory Coast) Entente Sportive de Bingerville
13	MF	Jean-Paul Késsé Mangoua	15 December 1984 (aged 24)		(Ivory Coast) ASEC Mimosas
14	MF	Antoine N'Gossan	30 November 1990 (aged 18)		(Ivory Coast) ASEC Mimosas
15	MF	Elysée	13 September 1989 (aged 19)		(Ivory Coast) Entente Sportive de Bingerville
16	GK	Christian Fabrice Okoua	6 November 1991 (aged 17)		(Ivory Coast) Africa Sports National
17	FW	Trazié Charles Tré Bi	20 September 1986 (aged 22)		(Ivory Coast) Séwé Sports de San Pedro
18	MF	Mé Aboubacar Diomandé	7 May 1988 (aged 20)		(Ivory Coast) Stella Club d'Adjamé
19	MF	Blaise Dago Adou	8 November 1985 (aged 23)		(Ivory Coast) Séwé Sports de San Pedro
20	DF	Kouassi Nicaise Aristide	8 February 1988 (aged 21)		(Ivory Coast) Africa Sports National
21	DF	Georges Eric Bilé	18 May 1989 (aged 19)		(Ivory Coast) Stade d'Abidjan
22	FW	Moise Valery Zegbé	28 April 1984 (aged 24)		(Ivory Coast) Entente Sportive de Bingerville
23	GK	Vincent Angban	2 February 1985 (aged 24)		(Ivory Coast) ASEC Mimosas

=== Senegal ===
The squad of Senegal was announced by head coach Joseph Koto on 14 February 2009.

No.	Pos.	Player	Date of birth (age)	Caps	Club
1	GK	Mamadou Ba	6 April 1989 (aged 19)		(Senegal) ASC Jaraaf
2	MF	Mustapha Diallo	3 December 1980 (aged 28)		(Senegal) ASC Jaraaf
3	DF	Mohamed Coly	2 February 1984 (aged 25)		(Italy) A.C. Rodengo Saiano
4	DF	Sidy N'Diaye	18 February 1988 (aged 21)		(Senegal) AS Douanes
5	DF	Mor Diouf	9 October 1984 (aged 24)		(Senegal) AS Douanes
6	DF	Papy Djilobodji	3 November 1985 (aged 23)		(Senegal) ASC Saloum
7	MF	Mamadou Baila Traoré	2 December 1990 (aged 18)		(Senegal) Port Autonome
8	MF	Vito Badiane	5 May 1989 (aged 19)		(Senegal) AS Douanes
9	FW	Pape Maly Diamanka	31 August 1979 (aged 29)		(Senegal) US Gorée
10	FW	Mouchid Iyane Ly	7 October 1988 (aged 20)		(Senegal) ASC Linguère
11	FW	Yally Fall Guène	20 August 1985 (aged 23)		(Senegal) CNEPS Excellence
12	DF	Libasse Faye Diagne	6 July 1988 (aged 20)		(Senegal) ASC Diaraf
13	DF	Babacar Ndiour	10 February 1982 (aged 27)		(Senegal) AS Douanes
14	FW	El Hadji Ndao	10 February 1982 (aged 27)		(Senegal) ASC Jeanne d'Arc
15	FW	Malick Fall	19 October 1984 (aged 24)		(Senegal) AS Douanes
16	GK	Biti Sy	5 April 1975 (aged 33)		(Senegal) ASC Jeanne d'Arc
17	FW	M. Benjeloun N'Diaye	26 February 1988 (aged 20)		(Senegal) ASC Xam-Xam
18	MF	Karamba Diallo	3 March 1984 (aged 24)		(Senegal) AS Douanes
19	FW	Alpha Oumar Sow	15 March 1983 (aged 25)		(Senegal) Casa Sport
20	GK	Amadou Fall Hane	2 May 1977 (aged 31)		(Senegal) Casa Sport
21	MF	Mame Cheikh Diallo	28 December 1988 (aged 20)		(Senegal) Port Autonome
22	DF	Mousa Dembélé	7 May 1988 (aged 20)		(Senegal) ASC Linguère
23	GK	Pape Latyr N'Diaye	25 December 1988 (aged 20)		(Senegal) US Ouakam

=== Tanzania ===
Head Coach: (Brazil) Marcio Maximo

No.	Pos.	Player	Date of birth (age)	Caps	Club
1	GK	Deogratias Munishi	6 April 1989 (aged 19)		(Tanzania) Simba SC
2	DF	Salum Swedi	3 December 1980 (aged 28)		(Tanzania) Mtibwa Sugar FC
3	MF	Haruna Moshi	26 February 1984 (aged 24)		(Tanzania) Simba SC
4	MF	Athuman Idd	18 February 1988 (aged 21)		(Tanzania) Young Africans FC
5	DF	Kelvin Yondan	9 October 1984 (aged 24)		(Tanzania) Simba SC
6	MF	Henry Joseph Shindika	3 November 1985 (aged 23)		(Tanzania) Simba SC
7	MF	Kigi Makasi	2 December 1990 (aged 18)		(Tanzania) Young Africans FC
8	MF	Mrisho Ngasa	5 May 1989 (aged 19)		(Tanzania) Young Africans FC
9	MF	Geofrey Bonny Namwandu	31 August 1979 (aged 29)		(Tanzania) Young Africans FC
10	FW	Jerson Tegete	7 October 1988 (aged 20)		(Tanzania) Young Africans FC
11	FW	Musa Mgosi	20 August 1985 (aged 23)		(Tanzania) Simba SC
12	MF	Nurdin Bakari	6 July 1988 (aged 20)		(Tanzania) Young Africans FC
13	DF	Nadir Haroub	10 February 1982 (aged 27)		(Tanzania) Young Africans FC
14	DF	Shadrack Nsajigwa	10 February 1982 (aged 27)		(Tanzania) Young Africans FC
15	MF	Abdi Kassam Sadallah	19 October 1984 (aged 24)		(Tanzania) Young Africans FC
16	MF	Nizar Khalfan	21 June 1988 (aged 20)		(Tanzania) Moro United
17	DF	Amir Maftah	26 February 1988 (aged 20)		(Tanzania) Young Africans FC
18	GK	Shaban Dihile Mohamed	3 March 1984 (aged 24)		(Tanzania) JKT Ruvu Stars
19	MF	Shaban Nditi	15 March 1983 (aged 25)		(Tanzania) Mtibwa Sugar FC
20	GK	Farouk Ramadhan Nzee	2 May 1977 (aged 31)		(Tanzania) Miembeni
21	DF	Juma Jabu	28 December 1988 (aged 20)		(Tanzania) Simba SC
22	DF	Erasto Nyoni	7 May 1988 (aged 20)		(Tanzania) Azam FC
23	MF	Mwinyi Kazimoto	25 December 1988 (aged 20)		(Tanzania) JKT Ruvu Stars

=== Zambia ===
The squad of Zambia was announced by head coach Hervé Renard on 11 February 2009.

No.	Pos.	Player	Date of birth (age)	Caps	Club
1	GK	Jacob Banda	11 February 1988 (aged 21)		(Zambia) ZESCO United F.C.
2	MF	Francis Kasonde	1 September 1986 (aged 22)		(Zambia) Power Dynamos F.C.
3	MF	Nyambe Mulenga	27 August 1987 (aged 21)		(Zambia) ZESCO United F.C.
4	MF	Jonas Sakuwaha	22 July 1983 (aged 25)		(Zambia) ZESCO United F.C.
5	DF	Elijah Tana	28 February 1975 (aged 33)		(Zambia) Nchanga Rangers F.C.
6	DF	Dennis Banda	10 December 1988 (aged 20)		(Zambia) Green Buffaloes F.C.
7	MF	Henry Banda	16 September 1990 (aged 18)		(Zambia) Zanaco F.C.
8	MF	Patrick Kasunga	5 May 1987 (aged 21)		(Zambia) Chambishi F.C.
9	MF	Stanley Banda	5 June 1983 (aged 25)		(Zambia) Red Arrows F.C.
10	MF	William Njobvu	4 March 1987 (aged 21)		(Zambia) Lusaka Dynamos F.C.
11	MF	Kennedy Mudenda	13 January 1988 (aged 21)		(Zambia) Power Dynamos F.C.
12	DF	George Chilufya	23 November 1986 (aged 22)		(Zambia) Nchanga Rangers F.C.
13	DF	Jimmy Chisenga	3 April 1992 (aged 16)		(Zambia) Red Arrows F.C.
14	DF	Emmanuel Mbola	10 May 1993 (aged 15)		(Zambia) Zanaco F.C.
15	FW	Given Singuluma	19 July 1986 (aged 22)		(Zambia) Zanaco F.C.
16	GK	Mike Poto	15 January 1981 (aged 28)		(Zambia) Green Buffaloes F.C.
17	FW	Ignatius Lwipa	4 March 1986 (aged 22)		(Zambia) Zanaco F.C.
18	MF	Simon Bwalya	25 February 1985 (aged 23)		(Zambia) Power Dynamos F.C.
19	MF	Kebby Hachipuka	13 June 1984 (aged 24)		(Zambia) Green Eagles F.C.
20	DF	Perry Mubanga	25 October 1983 (aged 25)		(Zambia) Power Dynamos F.C.
21	FW	Makundika Sakala	3 July 1981 (aged 27)		(Zambia) Amakumbi F.C.
22	GK	Davy Kaumbwa	5 February 1987 (aged 22)		(Zambia) Green Buffaloes F.C.
23	FW	Elson Mkandawire	25 November 1986 (aged 22)		(Zambia) Power Dynamos F.C.

== Group B ==
=== DR Congo ===
The squad of the DR Congo was announced by head coach Jean-Santos Muntubila on 10 February 2009.

No.	Pos.	Player	Date of birth (age)	Caps	Club
1	GK	Robert Kidiaba	1 February 1976 (aged 33)		(Democratic Republic of the Congo) TP Mazembe
2	FW	Yves Diba Ilunga	12 August 1987 (aged 21)		(Democratic Republic of the Congo) AS Vita Club
3	DF	Patou Simbi Ebunga	26 August 1983 (aged 25)		(Democratic Republic of the Congo) DC Motema Pembe
4	DF	Eric Nkulukuta	6 September 1989 (aged 19)		(Democratic Republic of the Congo) TP Mazembe
5	DF	Kazadi Mutombo	6 July 1989 (aged 19)		(Democratic Republic of the Congo) FC Saint-Éloi Lupopo
6	MF	Mihayo Kazembe	17 January 1976 (aged 33)		(Democratic Republic of the Congo) TP Mazembe
7	MF	Ngandu Kasongo	6 December 1979 (aged 29)		(Democratic Republic of the Congo) TP Mazembe
8	FW	Trésor Mputu	10 December 1985 (aged 23)		(Democratic Republic of the Congo) TP Mazembe
9	MF	Tychique Ntela Kalema	12 December 1987 (aged 21)		(Democratic Republic of the Congo) AS Vita Club
10	MF	Mbenza Bedi	11 September 1984 (aged 24)		(Democratic Republic of the Congo) TP Mazembe
11	FW	Déo Kanda	11 August 1989 (aged 19)		(Democratic Republic of the Congo) TP Mazembe
12	DF	Bawaka Mabele	9 June 1988 (aged 20)		(Democratic Republic of the Congo) TP Mazembe
13	MF	Matondo Salakiaku	26 January 1986 (aged 23)		(Democratic Republic of the Congo) DC Motema Pembe
14	FW	Serge Lofo Bongeli	13 October 1983 (aged 25)		(Democratic Republic of the Congo) AS Vita Club
15	DF	Joël Kimwaki	14 October 1986 (aged 22)		(Democratic Republic of the Congo) DC Motema Pembe
16	GK	Pisco Vuanga	12 September 1982 (aged 26)		(Democratic Republic of the Congo) AS New Soger
17	DF	Ngoy Bomboko	21 May 1977 (aged 31)		(Democratic Republic of the Congo) TP Mazembe
18	DF	Gladys Bokese	10 September 1981 (aged 27)		(Democratic Republic of the Congo) DC Motema Pembe
19	FW	Dioko Kaluyituka	2 January 1987 (aged 22)		(Democratic Republic of the Congo) TP Mazembe
20	DF	Matthieu Onoseke	18 March 1988 (aged 20)		(Democratic Republic of the Congo) SC Cilu
21	DF	Makiadi Pambani	24 August 1985 (aged 23)		(Democratic Republic of the Congo) AS New Soger
22	FW	Luyeye Mvete	28 April 1981 (aged 27)		(Democratic Republic of the Congo) TP Mazembe
23	GK	Bengele Bombasa	24 February 1982 (aged 26)		(Democratic Republic of the Congo) AS Vita Club

=== Ghana ===
From a preliminary squad of 40 players, Ghana head coach Milovan Rajevac named the final squad on 14 February 2009.

No.	Pos.	Player	Date of birth (age)	Caps	Club
1	GK	Philemon McCarthy	14 August 1983 (aged 25)		(Ghana) Hearts of Oak
2	DF	Samuel Inkoom	1 June 1989 (aged 19)		(Ghana) Asante Kotoko
3	MF	Daniel Nana Yeboah	20 July 1984 (aged 24)		(Ghana) Heart of Lions
4	DF	Francis Mantey	15 November 1987 (aged 21)		(Ghana) Wa All Stars
5	DF	Ofosu Appiah	29 December 1988 (aged 20)		(Ghana) Asante Kotoko
6	MF	Iddrisu Yahaya	12 August 1985 (aged 23)		(Ghana) Kessben
7	MF	Jordan Opoku	10 August 1984 (aged 24)		(Ghana) Asante Kotoko
8	MF	Ibrahim Ayew	16 April 1988 (aged 20)		(Ghana) Sekondi Eleven Wise
9	FW	Yaw Antwi	15 June 1985 (aged 23)		(Ghana) Liberty Professionals
10	FW	Kwadwo Poku	5 May 1985 (aged 23)		(Ghana) Asante Kotoko
11	FW	Samuel Ayew Yeboah	10 April 1988 (aged 20)		(Ghana) Liberty Professionals
12	DF	Isaac Owusu	20 March 1985 (aged 23)		(Ghana) Wa All Stars
13	DF	Habib Mohamed	10 December 1983 (aged 25)		(Ghana) Ashanti Gold
14	MF	Charles Asampong Taylor	14 July 1981 (aged 27)		(Ghana) Hearts of Oak
15	FW	Stephen Manu	21 January 1985 (aged 24)		(Ghana) Asante Kotoko
16	GK	Ernest Sowah	31 March 1988 (aged 20)		(Ghana) Tema Youth
17	FW	Francis Coffie	16 August 1988 (aged 20)		(Ghana) Asante Kotoko
18	MF	Edmund Owusu-Ansah	2 April 1983 (aged 25)		(Ghana) Heart of Lions
19	MF	Emmanuel Agyemang-Badu	2 December 1990 (aged 18)		(Ghana) Asante Kotoko
20	FW	Enoch Andoh	1 January 1993 (aged 16)		(Ghana) King Faisal Babes
21	DF	Harrison Afful	24 July 1986 (aged 22)		(Ghana) Feyenoord Academy
22	GK	Daniel Agyei	10 November 1989 (aged 19)		(Ghana) Liberty Professionals
23	FW	Godwin Osei Bonsu	3 March 1989 (aged 19)		(Ghana) Hearts of Oak

=== Libya ===
No.	Pos.	Player	Date of birth (age)	Caps	Club
1	GK	Samir Aboud	29 September 1972 (aged 36)		(Libya) Al-Ittihad
2	DF	Hesham Shaban	8 August 1980 (aged 28)		(Libya) Al-Ittihad
3	DF	Walid Al Sbaay	28 March 1983 (aged 25)		(Libya) Al Ahli Tripoli
4	DF	Omar Daoud	9 April 1983 (aged 25)		(Libya) Al Ahli Tripoli
5	DF	Younes Al Shibani	27 June 1981 (aged 27)		(Libya) Al-Ittihad
6	MF	Mohamed Esnany	13 May 1984 (aged 24)		(Libya) Al-Ittihad
7	MF	Ali Alsbaay	28 October 1982 (aged 26)		(Libya) Al-Ittihad
8	FW	Riyadh al Laafi	5 July 1980 (aged 28)		(Libya) Al-Ittihad
9	FW	Salem Ibrahim Al Rewani	28 February 1977 (aged 31)		(Libya) Al-Ittihad
10	MF	Ahmed Saad Osman	7 August 1979 (aged 29)		(Libya) Al Ahli Tripoli
11	MF	Ahmed Zuway	28 December 1982 (aged 26)		(Libya) Al Ahli Tripoli
12	GK	Guma Mousa	1 December 1978 (aged 30)		(Libya) Al Akhdar
13	MF	Arafa Nakuaa	23 January 1982 (aged 27)		(Libya) Al-Ittihad
14	MF	Mansour Al Borki	3 July 1985 (aged 23)		(Libya) Aljazeera
15	DF	Ashraf Al-Amari	24 October 1984 (aged 24)		(Libya) Al-Madina
16	MF	Nader Al-Tarhouni	24 October 1979 (aged 29)		(Libya) Al-Ittihad
17	FW	Mohamed Zubya	20 March 1989 (aged 19)		(Libya) Al-Ittihad
18	DF	Osama Al Hamadi	7 June 1975 (aged 33)		(Libya) Al-Ittihad
19	FW	Osama Mohamed El Fezzani	23 February 1978 (aged 30)		(Libya) Al Ahli Tripoli
20	MF	Muhammad Al Maghrabi	19 April 1985 (aged 23)		(Libya) Al Ahli Tripoli
21	GK	Abdussalam Msallem	2 August 1984 (aged 24)		(Libya) Aljazeera
22	DF	Ahmed Muftah	16 December 1981 (aged 27)		(Libya) Al Ahli Tripoli
23	MF	Abdulnaser Slil	2 September 1981 (aged 27)		(Libya) Al-Ittihad

=== Zimbabwe ===
No.	Pos.	Player	Date of birth (age)	Caps	Club
1	GK	Willard Manyatera	6 August 1985 (aged 23)		(Zimbabwe) Dynamos
2	GK	Maxwell Nyamupanedengu	26 October 1984 (aged 24)		(Zimbabwe) Kiglon
3	FW	David Kutyauripo	7 March 1979 (aged 29)		(Zimbabwe) Monomotapa United
4	DF	Thomas Sweswe	9 August 1981 (aged 27)		(Zimbabwe) CAPS United
5	DF	Zhaimu Jambo	23 September 1987 (aged 21)		(Zimbabwe) Dynamos
6	MF	Guthrie Zhokinyi	8 May 1985 (aged 23)		(Zimbabwe) Njube Sundowns
7	MF	Oscar Machapa	1 June 1987 (aged 21)		(Zimbabwe) CAPS United
8	MF	George Magariro	20 February 1981 (aged 28)		(Zimbabwe) Dynamos
9	FW	Daniel Vheremu	18 March 1985 (aged 23)		(Zimbabwe) Eagles
10	MF	Gilbert Banda	30 May 1983 (aged 25)		(Zimbabwe) Dynamos
11	MF	Carrington Gomba	8 March 1985 (aged 23)		(Zimbabwe) Gunners
12	DF	Pride Tafirenyika	21 January 1984 (aged 25)		(Zimbabwe) Gunners
13	FW	Mtshumayeli Moyo	24 July 1983 (aged 25)		(Zimbabwe) Highlanders
14	DF	Ovidy Karuru	23 January 1989 (aged 20)		(Zimbabwe) Gunners
15	MF	Archford Gutu	5 August 1993 (aged 15)		(Zimbabwe) CAPS United
16	MF	Thabani Kamusoko	2 March 1988 (aged 20)		(Zimbabwe) Underhill
17	DF	Elvis Meleka	19 April 1986 (aged 22)		(Zimbabwe) Masvingo United
18	FW	Edmore Chitato	2 May 1980 (aged 28)		(Zimbabwe) Kiglon
19	DF	Tawanda Nyamandwe	14 June 1983 (aged 25)		(Zimbabwe) CAPS United
20	DF	Phillip Marufu	10 January 1984 (aged 25)		(Zimbabwe) Highlanders
21	DF	Cuthbert Malajila	3 October 1985 (aged 23)		(Zimbabwe) Dynamos
22	GK	Tafadzwa Dube	19 December 1984 (aged 24)		(Zimbabwe) Dynamos
23	MF	Clive Kawinga	17 August 1986 (aged 22)		(Zimbabwe) Shooting Stars
