= 2008–09 in Libyan football =

The 2008–09 season is the 96th season of competitive football in Libya.

== Overview ==
- Aman al Aam, Wefaq Sabratha & Sweahly are all playing in the Premier League after winning promotion from the Libyan Second Division last season. Sweahly and Wefaq are returning after a 3-year absence, while Aman al Aam are making their debut as a re-incarnation of Al-Shorta Tripoli.
- Ahly Benghazi, Hilal and Nasr are all playing at the Martyrs of February Stadium, the new LYD 20,000,000 project that opened on March 5, 2009

== Events ==
On October 15, 2008, the Libyan Super Cup was won Ittihad as they defeated Khaleej Sirte 4–0 at 11 June Stadium.

On October 17, 2008, the 2008–09 Libyan Premier League season started at the Green Document Stadium, at 14:00 GMT where Akhdar defeated Tersanah by 3 goals to 1.

On November 4, 2008, the 2008–09 Libyan Second Division season started.

On February 26, 2009, the 2008–09 Libyan Cup competition started.

On May 28, 2009, Al Wahda Tripoli's relegation from the Libyan Premier League was confirmed after a 4–1 away defeat to Ahly Benghazi.

== National team ==
The home team is on the left hand column; the away team is on the right hand column.

=== Friendly Matches ===
20 August 2008
20:00 EET

Libya	2 – 2	Senegal

11 June Stadium, Tripoli

24 August 2008
19:40 EET

Libya	3 – 0	Chad
Dawood 19'; Esnani 77' al Tarhouni 80'

11 June Stadium, Tripoli

28 August 2008
20:00 EET

Libya	6 – 2	Niger
al Maghrabi 25', 76' al Masly 44' al Tarhouni 51'; Zubya 87'; Kader 90+1' (o.g.)		Sacko 38', 77'

11 June Stadium, Tripoli
Referee: (Algeria) Algerian Officials

20 August 2008
20:00 EET

Libya	2 – 3	Uruguay
Esnani 31' al Fazzani 57'	(Report)	Eguren 14'; Martínez 70'; Pereira 74'

11 June Stadium, Tripoli

18 February 2009
14:00 EET

Libya	1 – 0	Senegal
Zubya 74'	(Report)

11 June Stadium, Tripoli

=== World Cup Qualifiers ===
Libya was in Group 4 of the 2010 FIFA World Cup qualification process

5 September 2008
21:00 EET

Libya	1 – 0	Ghana
al Rewani (yellow card) 5'; Saad (yellow card) 44' (goal) 86'	(Report) (in Arabic)	Kingston (yellow card) 26'; Agogo (yellow card) 30'

11 June Stadium, Tripoli
Attendance: 45,000
Referee: (Mali) Koman Coulibaly

11 October 2008
16:30 EET

Gabon	1 – 0	Libya
Moubamba (yellow card) 41'; Mbanangoye 83'; Meye (yellow card) 89'	(Report)	al Sbaay (yellow card) 9'; Hussein (yellow card) 29' al Fazzani (yellow card) 73'; Shaban (yellow card) 84'

Omnisports President Omar Bongo, Libreville
Attendance: 26,000
Referee: (South Africa) Daniel Bennett

=== African Nations Championship ===
Libya was in the North Zone for qualification to the inaugural African Nations Championship

==== Qualifying - Final Round ====
===== First leg =====
29 November 2008
21:00 EET

Morocco	3 – 1	Libya
Allaoui 11', 61'; Madihi 85'		Fazzani 25'

Stade Mohamed V, Casablanca

===== Second leg =====
13 December 2008
19:00 EET

Libya	3 – 0	Morocco
Zubya 18'; Zuway 47'; Saad 62'

11 June Stadium, Tripoli

Libya advance to CHAN 2009 finals.

==== Finals ====
Libya were drawn in Group B, along with DR Congo, Ghana and Zimbabwe.

2009-02-23
18:00

DR Congo	2 – 0	Libya
Kaluyituka 58'; Lofo 67' (pen.); Kimuaki (yellow card) 85'	(Report)	Shaban (yellow card) 66'; Saad (yellow card) 73'; Fazzani (yellow card) 77'

Stade Bouaké, Bouaké
Referee: (Ivory Coast) Desiré Doué Nomandiez

2009-02-26
18:00

Libya	1 – 1	Ghana
Saad 26'; Daoud (yellow card) 36'	(Report)	Coffie (yellow card) 30'; Badu (yellow card) 62'; Yeboah (yellow card) 73'; Owusu-Ansah 76'

Stade Bouaké, Bouaké
Referee: (Senegal) Cheick Ahmed Tidiane Seck

2009-03-01
16:00

Zimbabwe	0 – 0	Libya
Karuru (yellow card) 18'; Meleka (yellow card) 37'; Gomba (yellow card) 86'	(Report)	Esnani (yellow card) 17'

Stade Félix Houphouët-Boigny, Abidjan
Referee: (Togo) Kokou Djaoupe

Team	Pld	W	D	L	GF	GA	GD	Pts
Ghana	3	1	2	0	6	3	+3	5
DR Congo	3	1	1	1	3	4	-1	4
Zimbabwe	3	0	3	0	3	3	0	3
Libya	3	0	2	1	1	3	-2	2

== Performance in CAF competitions ==
=== Qualified Teams ===
- Ittihad - CAF Champions League 2009 (as Libyan Premier League 2007-08 winners)
- Ahly Tripoli - CAF Champions League 2009 (as Libyan Premier League 2007-08 runners-up)
- Ahly Benghazi - CAF Confederation Cup 2009 (as Libyan Premier League 2007-08 third-placed team)
- Khaleej Sirte - CAF Confederation Cup 2009 (as Libyan Cup 2007–08 winners)

=== Fixtures & Results ===
==== First round ====
NB: Ittihad received bye to Round of 32

January 31, 2009
18:00 EET
Champions League
Preliminary Round, 1st Leg

Al Ahly Tripoli	6 – 0	(Niger) AS Police
Pierre Koko'o 14', 41', 90+5'; Waleed Sba'ai 69'; Nader Kara 89', 90+6'

11 June Stadium, Tripoli
Referee: (Morocco) Khalid Ramsis

February 15, 2009
15:30 GMT
Preliminary Round, 2nd Leg

(Niger) AS Police	2 – 1	Al Ahly Tripoli
55', 58'		Ahmed Saad 72'

Stade Général Seyni Kountché, Niamey
Referee: (Burkina Faso) Jean-Baptiste Bassono

Al Ahly Tripoli go through with an aggregate score of 7-2

February 1, 2009
15:00 EET
CAF Cup
Preliminary Round, 1st Leg

(Tanzania) Prisons FC	0 – 2	Khaleej Sirte
		Abdallah al Sheikhy 3'; Sheikh Sedao 59'

Benjamin Mkapa National Stadium, Dar-es-Salaam
Referee: (Kenya) Alfred Ndinya

February 14, 2009
13:30 GMT
CAF Cup
Preliminary Round, 2nd Leg

Khaleej Sirte	4 – 0	(Tanzania) Prisons FC
Sa'ad Abdelhafeedh 24', 69'; Sheikh Sedao 30'; Achour Majeed 80'

2 March Stadium, Sirte
Referee: (Egypt) Abderraouf Younis

Khaleej Sirte go through with an aggregate score of 6-0

February 1, 2009
17:00 GMT
CAF Cup
Preliminary Round, 1st Leg

(Sudan) Hay al Arab	0 – 1	Al Ahly Benghazi
		Ifeanyi Frederick Onuigbo 36'; Hussein Fathi Sultaan (red card) 77'

Stade Port Sudan, Port Sudan
Referee: (Burundi) Jean-Claude Niyongabo

February 15, 2009
13:30 GMT
CAF Cup
Preliminary Round, 2nd Leg

Al Ahly Benghazi	0 – 1(a.e.t.) (3 – 2 pen.)	(Sudan) Hay al Arab
		Ahmed Martin 45+1'

28 March Stadium, Benghazi
Referee: (Algeria) Lamine Benaissa

Al Ahly Benghazi go through 3–2 on penalty kicks, after an aggregate score of 1-1.

==== Second round ====
First Legs to be played over March 13-March 15, 2009
Second Legs to be played over April 3-April 5, 2009

March 15, 2009
15:00 GMT
Champions League
First Round, 1st Leg

(Algeria) JS Kabylie	1 – 2	Ahly Tripoli
Idrissa Coulibaly 79' (pen.)		Ahmed Saad 55'; Osama Al Fazzani 74'

Stade 1er Novembre, Tizi Ouzou
Referee: (Egypt) Osman Samir

April 4, 2009
18:00 GMT
Champions League
First Round, 2nd Leg

Ahly Tripoli	1 – 0	(Algeria) JS Kabylie
Omar Dawood 39'

11 June Stadium, Tripoli
Referee: (Tunisia) Aouaz Trabelsi

Ahly Tripoli advance to the next stage of the competition with an aggregate score of 3–1.

March 13, 2009
17:30 EET
Champions League
First Round, 1st Leg

Ittihad	1 – 1	(Sudan) Al-Merreikh
Mohamed Zubya 47'		Haytham Tambal 74'

11 June Stadium, Tripoli
Referee: (Algeria) Mohamed Bichari

April 4, 2009
18:00 GMT
Champions League
First Round, 2nd Leg

(Sudan) Al-Merreikh	3 – 0	Ittihad
Endurance Idahor 9', 26'; Raji Abdel-Aati 38'

Al Merreikh Stadium, Omdurman
Referee: (Malawi) Kalyoto Ngosi

Ittihad are eliminated from the competition with an aggregate score of 4–1

March 14, 2009
16:00 GMT
CAF Cup
Second Round, 1st Leg

(Tunisia) CS Sfaxien	4 – 1	Ahly Benghazi
Hamza Younes 28', 70'; Hamdi Rouid 50'; Issam Merdassi 81' (pen.)		Ahmed al Masli 90+4'

Stade Taïeb Mhiri, Sfax
Referee: (Nigeria) Bunmi Ogunkolade

April 4, 2009
16:00 GMT
CAF Cup
Second Round, 2nd Leg

Ahly Benghazi	2 – 1	(Tunisia) CS Sfaxien
Ibrahim al Khalil 14'; Ifeanyi Frederick Onuigbo 82'		Issam Merdassi 25'; Hachem Abbes (yellow card) 45'

Martyrs of February Stadium, Benina
Attendance: 11,000
Referee: (Uganda) Ali Kalyango

Ahly Benghazi are eliminated from the competition with an aggregate score of 5–3

March 13, 2009
14:30 GMT
CAF Cup
Second Round, 1st Leg

Khaleej Sirte	0 – 1	(Algeria) ES Sétif
		Abdelmalek Ziaya 13'

2 March Stadium, Sirte
Referee: (Sudan) El Fadil Mohamed

April 3, 2009
20:00 EET
CAF Cup
Second Round, 2nd Leg

(Algeria) ES Sétif	5 – 0	Khaleej Sirte
Amine Aksas 30'; Abdelmalek Ziaya 46'; Lamouri Djediat 47', 55'; Mohamed Seguer 83'

Stade 8 Mai 1945, Sétif
Referee: (Tunisia) Yosr Saadallah

Khaleej Sirte are eliminated from the competition with an aggregate score of 6–0

==== Third round ====
First legs to be played over April 17-April 19, 2009
Second legs to be played over May 1-May 3, 2009

April 18, 2009
19:00 EET
Champions League
Second Round, 1st Leg

Ahly Tripoli	0 – 0	(Tunisia) ES Sahel
Ahmed Saad (penalty missed)

11 June Stadium, Tripoli
Referee: (Guinea) Yakhouba Keita

May 2, 2009
17:00 GMT
Champions League
Second Round, 2nd Leg

(Tunisia) ES Sahel	2 – 0	Ahly Tripoli
Sadat Bukari 17'; Ammar Jemal 43'

Stade Olympique de Sousse, Sousse
Referee: (Sudan) Khalid Abdul Rahman

Ahly Tripoli are eliminated from the competition with an aggregate score of 2–0

==== Fourth round ====
First legs to be played over May 17-May 19, 2009
Second legs to be played over May 29-May 31, 2009

May 15, 2009
19:00 EET
Confederation Cup
Second Round of 16, 1st Leg

Ahly Tripoli	0 – 0	(Egypt) Haras El Hodood

11 June Stadium, Tripoli
Referee: (Morocco) Abdellah El Achiri

May 31, 2009
19:00 EET
Confederation Cup
Second Round of 16, 2nd Leg

(Egypt) Haras El Hodood	2 – 1	Ahly Tripoli
Ahmed Salama 58', 88'		Nader Kara 37'

El Max Stadium, Alexandria
Referee: (Tunisia) Kacem Benacceur

Ahly Tripoli are eliminated from the competition with an aggregate score of 2–1

== Performance in UAFA Competitions ==
=== Qualified Teams ===
- Ittihad - Arab Champions League 2008-09 (as Libyan Premier League 2007-08 winners)
- Ahly Tripoli - Arab Champions League 2008-09 (as Libyan Premier League 2007-08 runners-up)

=== Fixtures & Results ===
First legs to be played over October 27-October 29, 2008
Second legs to be played over November 24-November 26, 2008

October 29, 2008
18:00 GMT
Arab Champions League
Round of 32, 1st Leg

Ittihad	1 – 1	(Tunisia) US Monastirienne
Ahmed Mahmoud Zuway 83'		Hicham Essifi 75'

11 June Stadium, Tripoli

November 26, 2008
14:30 GMT
Arab Champions League
Round of 32, 2nd Leg

(Tunisia) US Monastirienne	2 – 1	Ittihad
Fraj Saasi 1'; Hicham Essifi 8'		Ahmed Mahmoud Zuway 86'

Stade Mustapha Ben Jannet, Monastir

Ittihad are eliminated from the competition with an aggregate score of 3–2

October 29, 2008
18:30 GMT
Arab Champions League
Round of 32, 1st Leg

(Tunisia) ES Tunis	0 – 0	Ahly Tripoli

Stade El Menzah, Tunis

October 29, 2008
18:00 GMT
Arab Champions League
Round of 32, 2nd Leg

Ahly Tripoli	0 – 0 (8 – 9 pen.)	(Tunisia) ES Tunis

11 June Stadium, Tripoli

Al Ahly Tripoli are eliminated from the competition after losing a penalty shootout 9–8, after an aggregate score of 0–0

== Performance in UNAF Competitions ==
=== Qualified Teams ===
- Ittihad - North African Cup of Champions (Libyan Premier League 2007-08 winners)
- Khaleej Sirte - North African Cup Winners Cup (Libyan Cup 2007–08 winners)

=== Fixtures & Results ===
November 19, 2008
15:00 GMT
Cup Winners Cup
Qualifying Round, 1st Leg

(Morocco) Maghreb Fez	3 – 0	Khaleej Sirte
Kader Fall 9', 56'; Mustapha Mraini 69'

Complexe Hassan II, Fez
Attendance: 15,000

December 3, 2008
15:00 EET
Cup Winners Cup
Qualifying Round, 2nd Leg

Khaleej Sirte	0 – 1	(Morocco) Maghreb Fez
		Bouabid Bouden 90+2'

2 March Stadium, Sirte
Attendance: 1,500

Khaleej Sirte are eliminated from the competition with an aggregate score of 4–0

December 17, 2008
14:00 GMT
Champions' Cup
Semi-Final, 1st Leg

(Tunisia) Club Africain	2 – 1	Al Ittihad
Oussama Sellami 26'; Wissem Ben Yahia 61' (pen.)		Reyad Ellafi 68'

Stade Olympique d'El Menzah, Tunis
Attendance: 25,000

December 24, 2008
15:30 GMT
Champions' Cup
Semi-Final, 2nd Leg

Ittihad	1 – 1	(Tunisia) Club Africain
Mohammad Esnani 14'		Lassaad Ouertani 57'

11 June Stadium, Tripoli
Attendance: 35,000
Referee: (Egypt) Essam Abdelfattah

Ittihad are eliminated from the competition with an aggregate score of 3–2

January 8, 2009
15:00 GMT
Champions' Cup
3rd–4th Place Play-off

Al Ittihad	1 – 1	(Algeria) JS Kabylie
Ali Rahuma 20'; Mohammad Za'abia (penalty missed) 90+1'		Adlène Bensaid 79'

11 June Stadium, Tripoli
Referee: (Tunisia) Qasim Belnasir

There was an ongoing feud as to who would take 3rd place. Ittihad were originally given 3rd place as JS Kabylie did not play a penalty shootout, as they claim they won the tie on away goals. The Algerian club also said that Ittihad had an unfair advantage playing at home in a one-off match. As a result, UNAF met on January 19 to discuss the case. The UNAF later decided that the two clubs would share 3rd place, and therefore share the $75,000 prize fund.
