= 2012 Africa Cup of Nations squads =

The 2012 Africa Cup of Nations was an international football tournament held in Equatorial Guinea and Gabon from 21 January until 12 February 2012. The 16 national teams involved in the tournament were required to register a squad of 23 players; only players in those squads were eligible to take part in the tournament.

The deadline for participating associations to submit their squad was 11 January 2012 (midnight CET). Replacement of seriously injured players was permitted until 24 hours before the team in question's first Africa Cup of Nations match.

Should an association miss the deadline, it will be fined US$10,000. Only 21 players were allowed to register for the competition if the registration was received after 14 January 2012.

== Group A ==
=== Equatorial Guinea ===
Coach: (Brazil) Gílson Paulo

No.	Pos.	Player	Date of birth (age)	Caps	Club
1	GK	Danilo	5 March 1982 (aged 29)		(Brazil) América-PE
2	DF	Dani Evuy	11 March 1985 (aged 26)		(Spain) Villaviciosa de Odón
3	DF	Kily	5 February 1984 (aged 27)		(Spain) Langreo
4	DF	Rui	28 May 1985 (aged 26)		(Spain) Logroñés
5	DF	Fousseny Kamissoko	5 April 1983 (aged 28)		(Oman) Al-Suwaiq
6	MF	Juvenal (c)	3 April 1979 (aged 32)		(Spain) Sabadell
7	MF	Rolan de la Cruz	3 October 1984 (aged 27)		(Colombia) Fortaleza
8	FW	Randy	2 June 1987 (aged 24)		(Spain) Las Palmas
9	FW	Rodolfo Bodipo	25 October 1977 (aged 34)		(Spain) Deportivo La Coruña
10	FW	Iván Bolado	3 July 1989 (aged 22)		(Spain) Cartagena
11	FW	Javier Balboa	13 May 1985 (aged 26)		(Portugal) Beira-Mar
12	FW	Thierry Fidjeu	13 October 1982 (aged 29)		Unattached
13	MF	Jean-Maxime Ndongo	8 November 1992 (aged 19)		(Equatorial Guinea) Deportivo Mongomo
14	MF	Ben Konaté	27 December 1986 (aged 25)		(Equatorial Guinea) The Panthers
15	DF	Lawrence Doe	23 May 1978 (aged 33)		(Oman) Al-Shabab
16	DF	Sipo	21 April 1988 (aged 23)		(Spain) Badajoz
17	MF	Narcisse Ekanga	30 July 1981 (aged 30)		(Democratic Republic of the Congo) TP Mazembe
18	MF	Viera Ellong	14 June 1987 (aged 24)		(Equatorial Guinea) Sony de Elá Nguema
19	FW	Raúl Fabiani	23 February 1984 (aged 27)		(Spain) Alcoyano
20	MF	Daniel Ekedo	19 September 1989 (aged 22)		(Spain) San Roque de Lepe
21	GK	Achille Pensy	5 January 1987 (aged 25)		(Equatorial Guinea) The Panthers
22	GK	Felipe Ovono	26 July 1993 (aged 18)		(Equatorial Guinea) Sony de Elá Nguema
23	DF	Colin	31 December 1987 (aged 24)		(Equatorial Guinea) Deportivo Mongomo

=== Libya ===
Coach: (Brazil) Marcos Paqueta

No.	Pos.	Player	Date of birth (age)	Caps	Club
1	GK	Samir Aboud (c)	29 September 1972 (aged 39)		(Libya) Al-Ittihad Tripoli
2	DF	Rabea Al-Laafi	1 December 1990 (aged 21)		(Tunisia) Club Africain
3	DF	Abdulaziz Belraysh	12 July 1990 (aged 21)		(Libya) Al-Ittihad Tripoli
4	MF	Ahmed Al-Alwani	19 August 1981 (aged 30)		(Libya) Al-Madina
5	DF	Younes Al-Shibani	27 June 1981 (aged 30)		(Morocco) OC Khouribga
6	MF	Mohamed Esnani	13 May 1984 (aged 27)		(Tunisia) US Monastir
7	DF	Osama Chtiba	27 September 1988 (aged 23)		(Lebanon) Nejmeh SC
8	MF	Abdallah Sharif	30 March 1985 (aged 26)		(Libya) Al-Madina
9	FW	Mohamed Al Ghanodi	22 November 1992 (aged 19)		(Libya) Al-Ahly Tripoli
10	FW	Ahmed Saad Osman	7 August 1979 (aged 32)		(Tunisia) Club Africain
11	DF	Muhammad Al-Maghrabi	19 April 1985 (aged 26)		(Morocco) OC Khouribga
12	GK	Guma Mousa	1 December 1978 (aged 33)		(Libya) Al-Ahly Tripoli
13	DF	Mohamed El Monir	8 April 1992 (aged 19)		(Serbia) Jagodina
14	DF	Ali Salama	18 September 1987 (aged 24)		(Tunisia) Olympique Béja
15	MF	Marwan Mabrouk	15 December 1989 (aged 22)		(Libya) Al-Ittihad Tripoli
16	MF	Abubakr Al-Abaidy	27 October 1981 (aged 30)		(Libya) Al-Nasr Benghazi
17	MF	Walid El-Khatrouchi	6 November 1985 (aged 26)		(Libya) Al-Ittihad Tripoli
18	MF	Faisal Al Badri	4 June 1990 (aged 21)		(Libya) Al-Ahly Benghazi
19	FW	Ahmed Zuway	28 December 1982 (aged 29)		(Tunisia) CA Bizertin
20	FW	Ihaab Boussefi	23 June 1985 (aged 26)		(Libya) Al-Ittihad Tripoli
21	MF	Moataz Ben Amer	2 February 1981 (aged 30)		(Libya) Al-Ahly Benghazi
22	GK	Muhammad Nashnoush	15 June 1988 (aged 23)		(Libya) Al-Ittihad Tripoli
23	MF	Djamal Mahamat	26 April 1983 (aged 28)		(Portugal) Braga

=== Senegal ===
Coach: Amara Traoré

No.	Pos.	Player	Date of birth (age)	Caps	Club
1	GK	Bouna Coundoul	4 March 1982 (aged 29)	8	Unattached
2	MF	Rémi Gomis	14 February 1984 (aged 27)	12	(France) Valenciennes
3	DF	Lamine Sané	22 March 1987 (aged 24)	6	(France) Bordeaux
4	DF	Pape Diakhaté	21 June 1984 (aged 27)	36	(Spain) Granada
5	DF	Souleymane Diawara	24 December 1978 (aged 33)	44	(France) Marseille
6	DF	Kader Mangane	23 March 1983 (aged 28)	18	(France) Rennes
7	FW	Moussa Sow	19 January 1986 (aged 26)	12	(France) Lille
8	FW	Mamadou Niang (c)	13 October 1979 (aged 32)	51	(Qatar) Al-Sadd
9	FW	Souleymane Camara	22 December 1982 (aged 29)	30	(France) Montpellier
10	MF	Issiar Dia	8 June 1987 (aged 24)	14	(Turkey) Fenerbahçe
11	FW	Dame N'Doye	21 February 1985 (aged 26)	5	(Denmark) Copenhagen
12	DF	Moustapha Bayal Sall	30 November 1985 (aged 26)	26	(France) Saint-Étienne
13	DF	Jacques Faty	25 February 1984 (aged 27)	9	(Turkey) Sivasspor
14	MF	Deme N'Diaye	6 February 1985 (aged 26)	11	(France) Arles-Avignon
15	FW	Papiss Cissé	3 June 1985 (aged 26)	13	(England) Newcastle United
16	GK	Khadim N'Diaye	5 April 1985 (aged 26)	8	(Senegal) ASC Linguère
17	DF	Omar Daf	12 February 1977 (aged 34)	51	(France) Brest
18	MF	Guirane N'Daw	24 April 1984 (aged 27)	40	(England) Birmingham City
19	FW	Demba Ba	25 May 1985 (aged 26)	11	(England) Newcastle United
20	DF	Armand Traoré	8 October 1989 (aged 22)	2	(England) Queens Park Rangers
21	MF	Mohamed Diamé	14 June 1987 (aged 24)	5	(England) Wigan Athletic
22	DF	Cheikh M'Bengue	23 July 1988 (aged 23)	2	(France) Toulouse
23	GK	Pape Latyr N'Diaye	4 April 1985 (aged 26)	1	(Senegal) Ouakam

=== Zambia ===
Coach: (France) Hervé Renard

No.	Pos.	Player	Date of birth (age)	Caps	Club
1	GK	Kalililo Kakonje	1 January 1985 (aged 27)	19	(Democratic Republic of the Congo) TP Mazembe
2	DF	Francis Kasonde	1 September 1986 (aged 25)	30	(Democratic Republic of the Congo) TP Mazembe
3	MF	Chisamba Lungu	31 January 1991 (aged 20)	4	(Russia) Ural Yekaterinburg
4	DF	Joseph Musonda	30 May 1977 (aged 34)	87	(South Africa) Golden Arrows
5	DF	Hijani Himoonde	15 June 1985 (aged 26)	21	(Democratic Republic of the Congo) TP Mazembe
6	DF	Davies Nkausu	1 January 1986 (aged 26)	3	(South Africa) Supersport United
7	MF	Clifford Mulenga	5 August 1987 (aged 24)	22	(South Africa) Bloemfontein Celtic
8	MF	Isaac Chansa	23 March 1984 (aged 27)	40	(South Africa) Orlando Pirates
9	FW	Collins Mbesuma	3 February 1984 (aged 27)	37	(South Africa) Golden Arrows
10	MF	Felix Katongo	18 April 1984 (aged 27)	47	(Zambia) Green Buffaloes
11	FW	Christopher Katongo (c)	31 August 1982 (aged 29)	66	(China) Henan Construction
12	FW	James Chamanga	2 February 1980 (aged 31)	45	(China) Dalian Shide
13	DF	Stophira Sunzu	22 June 1989 (aged 22)	24	(Democratic Republic of the Congo) TP Mazembe
14	MF	Noah Chivuta	25 December 1983 (aged 28)	23	(South Africa) Free State Stars
15	DF	Chintu Kampamba	28 December 1980 (aged 31)	30	(South Africa) Bidvest Wits
16	GK	Kennedy Mweene	11 December 1984 (aged 27)	62	(South Africa) Free State Stars
17	MF	Rainford Kalaba	14 August 1986 (aged 25)	55	(Democratic Republic of the Congo) TP Mazembe
18	FW	Evans Kangwa	21 June 1994 (aged 17)	2	(Zambia) Nkana
19	MF	Nathan Sinkala	23 April 1991 (aged 20)	3	(Zambia) Green Buffaloes
20	FW	Emmanuel Mayuka	21 November 1990 (aged 21)	26	(Switzerland) Young Boys
21	MF	Jonas Sakuwaha	22 July 1983 (aged 28)	13	(Sudan) Al-Merreikh
22	GK	Joshua Titima	20 October 1992 (aged 19)	0	(Zambia) Power Dynamos
23	DF	Nyambe Mulenga	27 August 1987 (aged 24)	27	(Zambia) Zesco United

== Group B ==
=== Angola ===
Coach: Lito Vidigal

No.	Pos.	Player	Date of birth (age)	Caps	Club
1	GK	Wilson	22 July 1984 (aged 27)		(Angola) 1º de Agosto
2	DF	Marco Airosa	6 August 1984 (aged 27)		(Cyprus) AEL Limassol
3	MF	Osório	24 July 1981 (aged 30)		(Angola) Caála
4	DF	Dani Massunguna	1 May 1986 (aged 25)		(Angola) 1º de Agosto
5	DF	Kali	11 October 1978 (aged 33)		(Angola) 1º de Agosto
6	MF	Dédé	4 July 1981 (aged 30)		(Cyprus) AEL Limassol
7	FW	Djalma	30 May 1987 (aged 24)		(Portugal) Porto
8	MF	André Macanga (c)	14 May 1978 (aged 33)		(Kuwait) Al-Jahra
9	FW	Manucho	7 March 1983 (aged 28)		(Spain) Real Valladolid
10	DF	Zuela	3 August 1983 (aged 28)		(Greece) Atromitos
11	MF	Gilberto	21 September 1982 (aged 29)		(Belgium) Lierse
12	MF	Jaime	21 May 1982 (aged 29)		(Angola) Progresso
13	GK	Carlos	8 December 1979 (aged 32)		Unattached
14	DF	Amaro	12 November 1986 (aged 25)		(Angola) 1º de Agosto
15	MF	Miguel	17 September 1991 (aged 20)		(Angola) Petro Atlético
16	FW	Flávio	30 December 1979 (aged 32)		(Belgium) Lierse
17	FW	Mateus Galiano	19 June 1984 (aged 27)		(Portugal) Nacional
18	FW	Love	14 March 1979 (aged 32)		(Angola) Petro Atlético
19	FW	Nando Rafael	10 January 1984 (aged 28)		(Germany) FC Augsburg
20	FW	Manucho Barros	19 April 1986 (aged 25)		(Angola) Interclube
21	DF	Francisco Zalata	15 June 1987 (aged 24)		(Angola) 1º de Agosto
22	GK	Hugo	15 January 1986 (aged 26)		(Angola) Kabuscorp
23	FW	José Vunguidica	3 January 1990 (aged 22)		(Germany) Preußen Münster

=== Burkina Faso ===
Coach: (Portugal) Paulo Duarte

No.	Pos.	Player	Date of birth (age)	Caps	Club
1	GK	Daouda Diakité	30 March 1983 (aged 28)		(Belgium) Turnhout
2	DF	Ibrahim Gnanou	8 November 1986 (aged 25)		(Russia) Alania Vladikavkaz
3	MF	Djakaridja Koné	22 July 1986 (aged 25)		(Romania) Dinamo București
4	DF	Mamadou Tall	4 December 1982 (aged 29)		(Iran) Persepolis
5	MF	Mohamed Koffi	30 December 1986 (aged 25)		(Egypt) PetroJet
6	DF	Bakary Koné	27 April 1988 (aged 23)		(France) Lyon
7	MF	Florent Rouamba	31 December 1986 (aged 25)		(Moldova) Sheriff Tiraspol
8	MF	Mahamoudou Kéré	2 January 1982 (aged 30)		(Turkey) Konyaspor
9	FW	Moumouni Dagano (c)	1 January 1981 (aged 31)		(Qatar) Al-Khor
10	MF	Alain Traoré	31 December 1988 (aged 23)		(France) Auxerre
11	MF	Jonathan Pitroipa	12 April 1986 (aged 25)		(France) Rennes
12	FW	Prejuce Nakoulma	21 April 1987 (aged 24)		(Poland) Górnik Zabrze
13	FW	Aristide Bancé	19 September 1984 (aged 27)		(Turkey) Samsunspor
14	MF	Benjamin Balima	20 March 1985 (aged 26)		(Moldova) Sheriff Tiraspol
15	FW	Narcisse Yaméogo	19 November 1980 (aged 31)		(Portugal) Camacha
16	GK	Adama Sawadogo	20 January 1990 (aged 22)		(Gabon) Missile
17	DF	Paul Koulibaly	24 March 1986 (aged 25)		(Belgium) Olympic Charleroi
18	MF	Charles Kaboré	9 February 1988 (aged 23)		(France) Marseille
19	MF	Bertrand Traoré	6 September 1995 (aged 16)		Unattached
20	FW	Issiaka Ouédraogo	19 August 1988 (aged 23)		(Austria) Admira Wacker
21	MF	Abdou Razack Traoré	28 December 1988 (aged 23)		(Poland) Lechia Gdańsk
22	DF	Saïdou Panandétiguiri	22 March 1984 (aged 27)		(Malta) Valletta
23	GK	Germain Sanou	26 May 1992 (aged 19)		(France) Saint-Étienne

=== Ivory Coast ===
Coach: François Zahoui

No.	Pos.	Player	Date of birth (age)	Caps	Club
1	GK	Boubacar Barry	30 December 1979 (aged 32)	57	(Belgium) Lokeren
2	DF	Benjamin Angoua	28 November 1986 (aged 25)	12	(France) Valenciennes
3	DF	Arthur Boka	2 April 1983 (aged 28)	64	(Germany) VfB Stuttgart
4	DF	Kolo Touré	19 March 1981 (aged 30)	90	(England) Manchester City
5	MF	Didier Zokora	14 December 1980 (aged 31)	98	(Turkey) Trabzonspor
6	MF	Jean-Jacques Gosso	15 March 1983 (aged 28)	12	(Turkey) Mersin Idman Yurdu
7	FW	Seydou Doumbia	31 December 1987 (aged 24)	16	(Russia) CSKA Moscow
8	FW	Salomon Kalou	5 August 1985 (aged 26)	40	(England) Chelsea
9	MF	Cheick Tioté	21 June 1986 (aged 25)	24	(England) Newcastle United
10	MF	Gervinho	27 May 1987 (aged 24)	32	(England) Arsenal
11	FW	Didier Drogba (c)	11 March 1978 (aged 33)	78	(England) Chelsea
12	FW	Wilfried Bony	10 December 1988 (aged 23)	8	(Netherlands) Vitesse
13	MF	Didier Ya Konan	25 February 1984 (aged 27)	10	(Germany) Hannover 96
14	MF	Kafoumba Coulibaly	26 October 1985 (aged 26)	8	(France) Nice
15	MF	Max Gradel	30 November 1987 (aged 24)	6	(France) Saint-Étienne
16	GK	Daniel Yeboah	13 November 1984 (aged 27)	9	(France) Dijon
17	DF	Siaka Tiéné	22 February 1982 (aged 29)	71	(France) Paris Saint-Germain
18	MF	Kader Keïta	6 August 1981 (aged 30)	64	(Qatar) Al-Sadd
19	MF	Yaya Touré	13 May 1983 (aged 28)	62	(England) Manchester City
20	DF	Igor Lolo	22 July 1982 (aged 29)	13	(Russia) Kuban Krasnodar
21	DF	Emmanuel Eboué	4 June 1983 (aged 28)	67	(Turkey) Galatasaray
22	DF	Sol Bamba	13 January 1985 (aged 27)	21	(England) Leicester City
23	GK	Gérard Gnanhouan	12 February 1979 (aged 32)	9	(France) Avranches

=== Sudan ===
Coach: Mohamed Abdalla

No.	Pos.	Player	Date of birth (age)	Caps	Club
1	GK	Bahaeddine Rihan	1 January 1979 (aged 33)		(Sudan) Al-Hilal Club
2	FW	Mohamed Sheikh Eldin	19 March 1985 (aged 26)		(Sudan) Al Neel SC (Al-Hasahesa)
3	DF	Mowaia Bashir	17 April 1986 (aged 25)		(Sudan) Al-Ittihad SC (Wad Madani)
4	DF	Najm Eldin Abdullah	17 November 1987 (aged 24)		(Sudan) Al-Merreikh SC
5	MF	Ala'a Eldin Yousif	3 January 1982 (aged 30)		(Sudan) Al-Hilal Club
6	DF	Mosaab Omer	4 June 1984 (aged 27)		(Sudan) Al-Merreikh SC
7	FW	Ramadan Agab	20 February 1986 (aged 25)		(Sudan) Al-Mourada SC
8	MF	Haitham Mustafa (c)	19 July 1977 (aged 34)		(Sudan) Al-Hilal Club
9	MF	Saif Eldin Ali Idris Farah	30 November 1979 (aged 32)		(Sudan) Al-Hilal Club
10	FW	Muhannad El Tahir	3 December 1984 (aged 27)		(Sudan) Al-Hilal Club
11	MF	Faisal Agab	24 August 1978 (aged 33)		(Sudan) Al-Merreikh SC
12	MF	Bader Eldin Abdalla Galag	4 October 1981 (aged 30)		(Sudan) Al-Merreikh SC
13	DF	Amir Kamal	13 September 1987 (aged 24)		(Sudan) Al-Merreikh SC
14	DF	Balla Jabir	12 September 1985 (aged 26)		(Sudan) Al-Merreikh SC
15	DF	Ahmed El-Basha	2 January 1982 (aged 30)		(Sudan) Al-Merreikh SC
16	GK	El Muez Mahgoub	14 August 1978 (aged 33)		(Sudan) Al-Hilal Club
17	FW	Mudathir Karika	23 July 1988 (aged 23)		(Sudan) Al-Hilal Club
18	DF	Khalefa Ahmed Mohamed	23 November 1983 (aged 28)		(Sudan) Al-Hilal Club
19	MF	Mohamed Ahmed Bashir	23 May 1987 (aged 24)		(Sudan) Al-Hilal Club
20	MF	Mohammed Musa	7 August 1990 (aged 21)		(Sudan) Al-Nsoor
21	GK	Akram El Hadi Salim	27 February 1987 (aged 24)		(Sudan) Al-Merreikh SC
22	FW	Abdelrahman Korongo	28 November 1978 (aged 33)		(Sudan) Al-Merreikh
23	MF	Nizar Hamid	3 October 1988 (aged 23)		(Sudan) Al-Hilal Club

== Group C ==
=== Gabon ===
Coach: (Germany) Gernot Rohr

No.	Pos.	Player	Date of birth (age)	Caps	Club
1	GK	Didier Ovono (c)	23 January 1983 (aged 28)		(France) Le Mans
2	DF	Georges Ambourouet	1 May 1986 (aged 25)		(Gabon) Missile
3	DF	Edmond Mouele	18 February 1982 (aged 29)		(Gabon) Mangasport
4	DF	Rémy Ebanega	17 November 1989 (aged 22)		(Gabon) Bitam
5	DF	Bruno Ecuele Manga	16 July 1988 (aged 23)		(France) Lorient
6	MF	Cédric Boussoughou	20 July 1991 (aged 20)		(Gabon) Mangasport
7	FW	Stéphane N'Guéma	20 November 1984 (aged 27)		(Gabon) Bitam
8	MF	Lloyd Palun	28 November 1988 (aged 23)		(France) Nice
9	FW	Pierre-Emerick Aubameyang	18 June 1989 (aged 22)		(France) Saint-Étienne
10	FW	Daniel Cousin	7 February 1977 (aged 34)		(Gabon) Sapins
11	FW	Eric Mouloungui	14 March 1983 (aged 28)		(France) Laval
12	DF	Henri Junior Ndong	23 August 1992 (aged 19)		(Gabon) Bitam
13	FW	Bruno Zita Mbanangoyé	15 July 1980 (aged 31)		(Belarus) Dinamo Minsk
14	MF	Lévy Madinda	22 June 1992 (aged 19)		(Spain) Celta Vigo B
15	MF	André Biyogo Poko	7 March 1993 (aged 18)		(France) Bordeaux
16	GK	Yanne Bidonga	20 March 1979 (aged 32)		(Gabon) Mangasport
17	DF	Moïse Brou Apanga	4 February 1982 (aged 29)		(France) Brest
18	MF	Cédric Moubamba	14 October 1979 (aged 32)		(Gabon) Bitam
19	DF	Rodrigue Moundounga	28 August 1982 (aged 29)		(Tunisia) Olympique Béja
20	FW	Fabrice Do Marcolino	1 April 1984 (aged 27)		(France) Nice
21	FW	Roguy Méyé	7 October 1986 (aged 25)		(Hungary) Zalaegerszeg
22	DF	Charly Moussono	15 November 1984 (aged 27)		(Gabon) Missile
23	GK	Yves Bitséki Moto	23 April 1983 (aged 28)		(Gabon) Bitam

=== Morocco ===
Coach: (Belgium) Eric Gerets

No.	Pos.	Player	Date of birth (age)	Caps	Club
1	GK	Nadir Lamyaghri	13 February 1976 (aged 35)	38	(Morocco) Wydad Casablanca
2	DF	Michaël Chrétien Basser	10 July 1984 (aged 27)	30	(Turkey) Bursaspor
3	DF	Badr El Kaddouri	31 January 1981 (aged 30)	42	(Scotland) Celtic
4	DF	Ahmed Kantari	28 June 1985 (aged 26)	4	(France) Brest
5	DF	Mehdi Benatia	17 April 1987 (aged 24)	14	(Italy) Udinese
6	MF	Adil Hermach	27 June 1986 (aged 25)	9	(Saudi Arabia) Al-Hilal
7	MF	Adel Taarabt	24 May 1989 (aged 22)	12	(England) Queens Park Rangers
8	MF	Karim El Ahmadi	27 January 1985 (aged 26)	10	(Netherlands) Feyenoord
9	FW	Youssef El-Arabi	3 February 1987 (aged 24)	7	(Saudi Arabia) Al-Hilal
10	MF	Younès Belhanda	25 February 1990 (aged 21)	8	(France) Montpellier
11	MF	Oussama Assaidi	15 August 1988 (aged 23)	6	(Netherlands) Heerenveen
12	GK	Mohamed Amsif	7 February 1989 (aged 22)	1	(Germany) FC Augsburg
13	MF	Houssine Kharja (c)	9 November 1982 (aged 29)	66	(Italy) Fiorentina
14	MF	Mbark Boussoufa	15 August 1984 (aged 27)	26	(Russia) Anzhi Makhachkala
15	DF	Abdelhamid El Kaoutari	17 March 1990 (aged 21)	5	(France) Montpellier
16	DF	Jamal Alioui	2 June 1982 (aged 29)	14	(Qatar) Al Kharaitiyat
17	FW	Marouane Chamakh	10 January 1984 (aged 28)	59	(England) Arsenal
18	DF	Abdelfettah Boukhriss	22 October 1986 (aged 25)	2	(Morocco) FUS Rabat
19	MF	Mehdi Carcela	1 July 1989 (aged 22)	3	(Russia) Anzhi Makhachkala
20	FW	Youssouf Hadji	25 February 1980 (aged 31)	63	(France) Rennes
21	MF	Nordin Amrabat	31 March 1987 (aged 24)	2	(Turkey) Galatasaray
22	GK	Issam Badda	10 May 1983 (aged 28)	0	(Morocco) FUS Rabat
23	DF	Mustapha Mrani	2 March 1978 (aged 33)	1	(Morocco) MAS Fès

=== Niger ===
Coach: Harouna Gadbe

No.	Pos.	Player	Date of birth (age)	Caps	Club
1	GK	Saminou Rabo	23 August 1981 (aged 30)		(Niger) Sahel
2	FW	Moussa Maâzou	25 August 1988 (aged 23)		(Belgium) Zulte Waregem
3	MF	Abdoul Karim Lancina	20 May 1987 (aged 24)		(Cameroon) Cotonsport Garoua
4	DF	Amadou Kader	5 April 1989 (aged 22)		(Niger) Olympic
5	DF	Jimmy Bulus	22 October 1986 (aged 25)		(Algeria) NA Hussein Dey
6	MF	Idrissa Laouali	9 November 1983 (aged 28)		(Niger) ASFAN
7	FW	Idrissa Seydou	24 December 1988 (aged 23)		(Cameroon) Cotonsport Garoua
8	MF	Olivier Bonnes	7 February 1990 (aged 21)		(France) Lille
9	FW	Daouda Kamilou	29 December 1987 (aged 24)		(Tunisia) CS Sfaxien
10	MF	Talatou Boubacar	3 December 1987 (aged 24)		(South Africa) Orlando Pirates
11	FW	Issoufou Alhassane	1 January 1981 (aged 31)		(Morocco) Raja Casablanca
12	DF	Djibril Moussa Souna	7 May 1992 (aged 19)		(Niger) AS GNN
13	DF	Mohamed Chicoto	28 February 1989 (aged 22)		(South Africa) Platinum Stars
14	MF	Issoufou Boubacar Garba	2 February 1990 (aged 21)		(Thailand) Phuket
15	DF	Sulliman Johan Mazadou	11 April 1985 (aged 26)		(France) Marignane
16	GK	Kassaly Daouda	19 August 1983 (aged 28)		(Cameroon) Cotonsport Garoua
17	MF	William N'Gounou	31 July 1983 (aged 28)		(Sweden) IF Limhamn Bunkeflo
18	DF	Kofi Dankwa	19 September 1989 (aged 22)		(Tunisia) ES Zarzis
19	DF	Issiaka Koudize	18 October 1990 (aged 21)		(Niger) AS GNN
20	MF	Amadou Moutari	19 January 1994 (aged 18)		(Niger) Akokana
21	MF	Yacouba Seydou Ali	6 April 1992 (aged 19)		(Ivory Coast) Africa Sports
22	GK	Losseny Doumbia	5 April 1992 (aged 19)		(Democratic Republic of the Congo) DC Motema Pembé
23	DF	Mohamed Soumaïla	30 October 1994 (aged 17)		(Niger) Olympic

=== Tunisia ===
Coach: Sami Trabelsi

No.	Pos.	Player	Date of birth (age)	Caps	Club
1	GK	Moez Ben Chrifia	24 June 1991 (aged 20)	0	(Tunisia) Espérance
2	DF	Bilel Ifa	9 March 1990 (aged 21)	7	(Tunisia) Club Africain
3	DF	Karim Haggui (c)	20 January 1984 (aged 28)	70	(Germany) Hannover 96
4	MF	Adel Chedli	16 September 1976 (aged 35)	55	(Tunisia) Étoile du Sahel
5	DF	Ammar Jemal	20 April 1987 (aged 24)	18	(Germany) 1. FC Köln
6	MF	Hocine Ragued	11 February 1983 (aged 28)	30	(Turkey) Karabükspor
7	MF	Youssef Msakni	28 October 1990 (aged 21)	6	(Tunisia) Espérance
8	FW	Khaled Korbi	16 December 1985 (aged 26)	21	(Tunisia) Espérance
9	FW	Yassine Chikhaoui	22 September 1986 (aged 25)	21	(Switzerland) Zürich
10	MF	Oussama Darragi	3 April 1987 (aged 24)	23	(Switzerland) FC Sion
11	FW	Sami Allagui	28 May 1986 (aged 25)	14	(Germany) Mainz 05
12	DF	Khalil Chemmam	24 July 1987 (aged 24)	8	(Tunisia) Espérance
13	MF	Wissem Ben Yahia	9 September 1984 (aged 27)	21	(Turkey) Mersin İY
14	MF	Mejdi Traoui	13 December 1983 (aged 28)	22	(Tunisia) Espérance
15	FW	Zouheir Dhaouadi	1 January 1988 (aged 24)	18	(Tunisia) Club Africain
16	GK	Aymen Mathlouthi	14 September 1984 (aged 27)	27	(Tunisia) Étoile du Sahel
17	FW	Issam Jemâa	28 January 1984 (aged 27)	57	(France) Auxerre
18	DF	Anis Boussaïdi	10 April 1981 (aged 30)	19	(Russia) Rostov
19	FW	Saber Khelifa	14 October 1986 (aged 25)	3	(France) Evian
20	DF	Aymen Abdennour	6 August 1989 (aged 22)	9	(France) Toulouse
21	MF	Jamel Saihi	27 January 1987 (aged 24)	5	(France) Montpellier
22	GK	Rami Jridi	15 September 1984 (aged 27)	3	(Tunisia) Stade Tunisien
23	FW	Amine Chermiti	26 December 1987 (aged 24)	26	(Switzerland) Zürich

== Group D ==
=== Botswana ===
Coach: Stanley Tshosane

No.	Pos.	Player	Date of birth (age)	Caps	Club
1	GK	Noah Maposa	3 June 1985 (aged 26)		(Botswana) Gaborone United
2	DF	Ndiapo Letsholathebe	25 February 1983 (aged 28)		(Botswana) Police
3	DF	Mosimanegape Ramohibidu	15 June 1985 (aged 26)		(Botswana) BMC
4	DF	Mmusa Ohilwe	17 April 1986 (aged 25)		(Botswana) Gaborone United
5	DF	Mompati Thuma (c)	5 April 1980 (aged 31)		Botswana Defence Force
6	MF	Ofentse Nato	1 October 1989 (aged 22)		(Botswana) Gaborone United
7	FW	Pontsho Moloi	28 November 1981 (aged 30)		(Botswana) Centre Chiefs
8	MF	Phenyo Mongala	10 June 1985 (aged 26)		(South Africa) Bloemfontein Celtic
9	FW	Jerome Ramatlhakwane	29 October 1985 (aged 26)		Unattached
10	FW	Moemedi Moatlhaping	14 July 1985 (aged 26)		(South Africa) Bay United
11	FW	Dipsy Selolwane	27 January 1978 (aged 33)		(South Africa) SuperSport United
12	MF	Patrick Motsepe	1 July 1981 (aged 30)		(Botswana) BMC
13	MF	Boitumelo Mafoko	11 February 1982 (aged 29)		(South Africa) Santos
14	FW	Onalethata Thekiso	14 May 1981 (aged 30)		(Botswana) Township Rollers
15	DF	Monametsi Kelebale	15 July 1981 (aged 30)		(Botswana) Nico United
16	GK	Modiri Marumo	6 July 1976 (aged 35)		(South Africa) Bay United
17	MF	Abednico Powell	28 January 1983 (aged 28)		(Botswana) Township Rollers
18	MF	Mogogi Gabonamong	10 September 1982 (aged 29)		(South Africa) SuperSport United
19	MF	Mogakolodi Ngele	6 October 1990 (aged 21)		(Botswana) Township Rollers
20	GK	Kabelo Dembe	10 May 1990 (aged 21)		(Botswana) Township Rollers
21	MF	Lemponye Tshireletso	21 September 1984 (aged 27)		(Botswana) BMC
22	DF	Tshepo Motlhabankwe	17 March 1980 (aged 31)		(Botswana) Centre Chiefs
23	MF	Othusitse Pilane	26 March 1984 (aged 27)		(Botswana) Centre Chiefs

=== Ghana ===
Coach: (Serbia) Goran Stevanović

No.	Pos.	Player	Date of birth (age)	Caps	Club
1	GK	Daniel Adjei	10 November 1989 (aged 22)	4	(Ghana) Liberty Professionals
2	DF	Daniel Opare	18 October 1990 (aged 21)	7	(Belgium) Standard Liège
3	FW	Asamoah Gyan	22 November 1985 (aged 26)	54	(United Arab Emirates) Al-Ain
4	DF	John Paintsil	15 June 1981 (aged 30)	76	(England) Leicester City
5	DF	John Mensah (c)	29 November 1982 (aged 29)	75	(France) Lyon
6	MF	Anthony Annan	21 July 1986 (aged 25)	49	(Netherlands) Vitesse
7	DF	Samuel Inkoom	1 June 1989 (aged 22)	29	(Ukraine) Dnipro Dnipropetrovsk
8	MF	Emmanuel Agyemang-Badu	2 December 1990 (aged 21)	27	(Italy) Udinese
9	DF	Derek Boateng	2 May 1983 (aged 28)	30	(Ukraine) Dnipro Dnipropetrovsk
10	FW	André Ayew	17 December 1989 (aged 22)	34	(France) Marseille
11	MF	Sulley Muntari	27 August 1984 (aged 27)	67	(Italy) Internazionale
12	FW	Prince Tagoe	9 November 1986 (aged 25)	32	(Turkey) Bursaspor
13	FW	Jordan Ayew	11 September 1991 (aged 20)	3	(France) Marseille
14	DF	Masahudu Alhassan	1 December 1992 (aged 19)	1	(Italy) Genoa
15	DF	Isaac Vorsah	21 June 1988 (aged 23)	29	(Germany) 1899 Hoffenheim
16	GK	Adam Larsen Kwarasey	12 December 1987 (aged 24)	5	(Norway) Strømsgodset
17	DF	Lee Addy	7 July 1990 (aged 21)	23	(China) Dalian Aerbin
18	MF	Charles Takyi	12 November 1984 (aged 27)	1	(Germany) FC St. Pauli
19	DF	Jonathan Mensah	13 July 1990 (aged 21)	14	(France) Evian
20	MF	Kwadwo Asamoah	9 December 1988 (aged 23)	35	(Italy) Udinese
21	DF	John Boye	23 April 1987 (aged 24)	4	(France) Rennes
22	GK	Ernest Sowah	31 March 1988 (aged 23)	0	(Ghana) Berekum Chelsea
23	MF	Mohammed Abu	14 November 1991 (aged 20)	2	(Germany) Eintracht Frankfurt

Note: Caps and goals may be incomplete for certain players, therefore being inaccurate.

=== Guinea ===
Coach: (France) Michel Dussuyer

No.	Pos.	Player	Date of birth (age)	Caps	Club
1	GK	Naby Yattara	12 January 1984 (aged 28)		(France) Arles-Avignon
2	MF	Pascal Feindouno	27 February 1981 (aged 30)		Unattached
3	DF	Ibrahima Bangoura	25 July 1987 (aged 24)		(Mali) Djoliba
4	MF	Mamadou Bah	25 April 1988 (aged 23)		(Germany) VfB Stuttgart
5	DF	Bobo Baldé	5 October 1975 (aged 36)		(France) Arles-Avignon
6	DF	Kamil Zayatte (c)	7 March 1985 (aged 26)		(Turkey) İstanbul BB
7	FW	Abdoul Camara	20 February 1990 (aged 21)		(France) Sochaux
8	MF	Ibrahima Traoré	21 April 1988 (aged 23)		(Germany) VfB Stuttgart
9	FW	Sadio Diallo	28 December 1990 (aged 21)		(France) Bastia
10	DF	Ismaël Bangoura	2 June 1985 (aged 26)		(United Arab Emirates) Al-Nasr
11	MF	Ibrahima Yattara	3 June 1980 (aged 31)		(Turkey) Mersin Idman Yurdu
12	MF	Ibrahima Conte	3 April 1991 (aged 20)		(Belgium) Gent
13	DF	Morlaye Cissé	19 December 1983 (aged 28)		(Tunisia) EGS Gafsa
14	MF	Naby Soumah	4 August 1985 (aged 26)		(Tunisia) Sfaxien
15	DF	Oumar Kalabane	8 April 1981 (aged 30)		(United Arab Emirates) Al-Dhafra
16	GK	Abdul Aziz Keita	16 February 1989 (aged 22)		(Guinea) Kaloum
17	MF	Thierno Bah	5 October 1982 (aged 29)		(Switzerland) Lausanne-Sport
18	DF	Ibrahima Diallo	26 September 1985 (aged 26)		(Belgium) Waasland-Beveren
19	FW	Alhassane Bangoura	30 March 1992 (aged 19)		(Spain) Rayo Vallecano
20	DF	Habib Baldé	8 April 1985 (aged 26)		(Romania) Universitatea Cluj
21	FW	Ousmane Barry	27 September 1991 (aged 20)		(Tunisia) Étoile du Sahel
22	GK	Aboubacar Camara	1 June 1993 (aged 18)		(Spain) Alcoyano
23	DF	Lanfia Camara	3 October 1986 (aged 25)		(Belgium) White Star Woluwe

=== Mali ===
Coach: (France) Alain Giresse

No.	Pos.	Player	Date of birth (age)	Caps	Club
1	GK	Oumar Sissoko	13 September 1987 (aged 24)	10	(France) Metz
2	DF	Abdoulaye Maïga	20 December 1988 (aged 23)	9	(Algeria) USM Alger
3	DF	Adama Tamboura	18 May 1985 (aged 26)	49	(France) Metz
4	DF	Ousmane Berthé	5 February 1982 (aged 29)	10	(South Africa) Jomo Cosmos
5	DF	Cédric Kanté (c)	6 July 1979 (aged 32)	37	(Greece) Panathinaikos
6	FW	Mustapha Yatabaré	26 January 1986 (aged 25)	13	(France) Guingamp
7	MF	Abdou Traoré	17 January 1988 (aged 24)	15	(France) Bordeaux
8	MF	Souleymane Keita	24 November 1986 (aged 25)	4	(Turkey) Sivasspor
9	FW	Cheick Diabaté	25 April 1988 (aged 23)	13	(France) Bordeaux
10	FW	Modibo Maïga	3 September 1987 (aged 24)	27	(France) Sochaux
11	FW	Garra Dembélé	21 February 1986 (aged 25)	2	(Germany) SC Freiburg
12	MF	Seydou Keita	16 January 1980 (aged 32)	64	(Spain) Barcelona
13	DF	Idrissa Coulibaly	19 December 1987 (aged 24)	3	(Tunisia) Espérance
14	DF	Drissa Diakité	18 February 1985 (aged 26)	31	(France) Nice
15	MF	Bakaye Traoré	6 March 1985 (aged 26)	15	(France) Nancy
16	GK	Soumbeïla Diakité	25 August 1984 (aged 27)	19	(Mali) Stade Malien
17	MF	Mahamane Traoré	31 August 1988 (aged 23)	20	(France) Metz
18	MF	Samba Sow	29 April 1989 (aged 22)	9	(France) Lens
19	MF	Sidi Koné	6 June 1992 (aged 19)	3	(France) Lyon
20	MF	Samba Diakité	24 January 1989 (aged 22)	0	(France) Nancy
21	DF	Mahamadou N'Diaye	21 July 1990 (aged 21)	1	(Portugal) Vitória de Guimarães
22	GK	Almamy Sogoba	5 July 1988 (aged 23)	0	(Mali) Real Bamako
23	DF	Ousmane Coulibaly	9 July 1989 (aged 22)	2	(France) Brest
