= Football at the 2007 Arab Games =

2007 Arab Games football tournament
Tournament details
- Host country: Egypt
- City: Cairo
- Dates: 13–25 November 2007
- Teams: 5 (from 2 confederations)
- Venue: 3 (in 3 host cities)

Final positions
- Champions: Egypt (4th title)
- Runners-up: Libya
- Third place: Saudi Arabia
- Fourth place: UA Emirates B

Tournament statistics
- Matches played: 10
- Goals scored: 25 (2.5 per match)
- Top scorer(s): (Egypt) Emad Motaeb (5 goals)

The 2007 Arab Games football tournament was the 10th edition of the Arab Games men's football tournament. The football tournament was held in Cairo, Egypt between 13 and 25 November 2007 as part of the 2007 Arab Games. Egyptian team won the gold medal while Libya and Saudi Arabia took second and third place respectively.

== Participating teams ==
The following countries have participated for the final tournament:

- Egypt (hosts)
- Libya
- Saudi Arabia
- Sudan B
- United Arab Emirates B

== Final tournament ==
=== Tournament classification ===
Team	Pld	W	D	L	GF	GA	GD	Pts
Egypt	4	3	1	0	10	1	+9	10
Libya	4	3	1	0	7	1	+6	10
Saudi Arabia	4	1	1	2	5	5	0	4
UA Emirates	4	1	1	2	3	6	−3	4
Sudan	4	0	0	4	0	12	−12	0

=== Matches ===
13 November 2007
19:15 GMT

Egypt	3–0	UA Emirates
Moawad 55', 66'; Hosny 80'

Port Said Stadium, Port Said
14 November 2007
17:15 GMT

Saudi Arabia	2–0	Sudan
Tukar 17'; Al-Ghamdi 88'

Ismailia Stadium, Ismailia

16 November 2007
17:15 GMT

UA Emirates	0–2	Libya
		Al Fazzani 26', 90+1'

Port Said Stadium, Port Said
16 November 2007
19:15 GMT

Egypt	5–0	Sudan
Salama 2'; Motaeb 3', 50', 63', 76'

Ismailia Stadium, Ismailia

18 November 2007
15:15 GMT

Libya	2–1	Saudi Arabia
al Fazzani 24'; Daoud 90+4'		Khariri 9'

Ismailia Stadium, Ismailia
18 November 2007
17:00 GMT

Sudan	0–2	UA Emirates
		Hassan 7'; Qasim 34'

Port Said Stadium, Port Said

21 November 2007
15:15 GMT

Saudi Arabia	1–1	UA Emirates
Khalifa 44' (o.g.)		Al-Hamadi 7'

Ismailia Stadium, Ismailia
21 November 2007
17:15 GMT

Egypt	0–0	Libya

Port Said Stadium, Port Said

24 November 2007
17:00 GMT

Libya	3–0	Sudan
Al Fazzani 15'; Rahuma 42'; Saad 68'

Cairo International Stadium, Cairo
25 November 2007
17:00 GMT

Egypt	2–1	Saudi Arabia
Ghaly 39'; Motaeb 45'		Al-Qahtani 55' (pen.)

Cairo International Stadium, Cairo

== Scorers ==
5 goals

- (Egypt) Emad Motaeb

4 goals

- (Libya) Osama Al Fazzani

2 goals

- (Egypt) Sayed Moawad

1 goal

- (Egypt) Hossam Ghaly
- (Egypt) Osama Hosny
- (Egypt) Ahmed Salama
- (Libya) Omar Daoud
- (Libya) Ali Rahuma
- (Libya) Ahmad Sa'ad
- (Saudi Arabia) Yasser Al-Qahtani
- (Saudi Arabia) Omar Al-Ghamdi
- (Saudi Arabia) Redha Tukar
- (Saudi Arabia) Saud Kariri
- (United Arab Emirates) Mahmoud Hassan
- (United Arab Emirates) Abdullah Qasim
- (United Arab Emirates) Ismail Al-Hamaadi

Own Goal

- (United Arab Emirates) Obaid Khalifa (playing against Saudi Arabia)
