= 2008 North African Cup of Champions =

Tournament details
- Dates: 17 December 2008 – 25 January 2009
- Teams: 4 (from UNAF confederations)

Final positions
- Champions: (Tunisia) Club Africain (1st title)
- Runners-up: (Morocco) FAR Rabat

The 2008 North African Cup of Champions was the first edition of the competition initiated by the North African Football Union (UNAF). Tunisian side Club Africain were crowned champions after beating Moroccan side FAR Rabat 3-2 on penalties in the final, after both legs ended 0-0.

== Participating teams ==
| Algeria | JS Kabylie (Algerian Championnat National Winners 2007-08) |
| Egypt | Al Ahly^{1} (Egyptian Premier League Winners 2007-08) |
| Libya | Al Ittihad (Libyan Premier League Winners 2007-08) |
| Morocco | FAR Rabat (Botola Winners 2007-08) |
| Tunisia | Club Africain (Tunisian Ligue Professionnelle 1 Winners 2007-08) |

^{1} Al Ahly did not compete as they had commitments with the Club World Championship in Japan.

== Semi-final ==
=== Draw ===
==== First Legs ====
(Tunisia) Club Africain 2 - 1 (Libya) Al Ittihad (17 December)

(Algeria) JS Kabylie 1 - 1 (Morocco) FAR Rabat (19 December)

17 December 2008
14:00 GMT

| Club Africain (Tunisia) | 2 – 1 | (Libya) Al Ittihad |
|---|---|---|
| Sellami 26'; Ben Yahia 61' (pen.) | | Ellafi 68' |

Stade Olympique d'El Menzah
Attendance: 25,000

19 December 2008
14:00 GMT

| JS Kabylie (Algeria) | 1 – 1 | (Morocco) FAR Rabat |
|---|---|---|
| Coulibaly 23' | | Ouchela 48' |

Stade 1er Novembre
Attendance: 15,000

==== Second Legs ====
(Libya) Al Ittihad 1 - 1 (Tunisia) Club Africain (24 December)

(Morocco) FAR Rabat 1 - 0 (Algeria) JS Kabylie (26 December)

24 December 2008
15:30 GMT

| Al Ittihad (Libya) | 1 – 1 | (Tunisia) Club Africain |
|---|---|---|
| Esnani 14' | | Ouertani 57' |

11 June Stadium
Attendance: 35,000
Referee: (Egypt) Essam Abdelfattah

Club Africain advance to the Final with an aggregate score of 3-2

26 December 2008
14:30 GMT

| FAR Rabat (Morocco) | 1 – 0 | (Algeria) JS Kabylie |
|---|---|---|
| Akadar 59' |

Stade Moulay Abdellah

FAR Rabat advance to the Final with an aggregate score of 2-1

== 3rd/4th-place play-off ==
8 January 2009
15:00 GMT

| Al Ittihad (Libya) | 1 – 1 | (Algeria) JS Kabylie |
|---|---|---|
| Rahuma 20'; Zubya (penalty missed) 90+1 | | Bensaid 79' |

11 June Stadium
Referee: (Tunisia) Qasim Belnasir

There has been an ongoing feud as to who will take 3rd place. Al Ittihad were originally given 3rd place as JS Kabylie did not play a penalty shootout, as they claim they won the tie on away goals. The Algerian club also said that Ittihad had an unfair advantage playing at home in a one-off match. As a result, CAF will meet on 19 January to discuss the match.

The FNAF later decided that the two clubs would share 3rd place, and therefore share the $75,000 prize fund.

== Final ==
Following a draw in the first leg of the UNAF Cup final, Club Africain of Tunisia and FAR Rabat of Morocco contested the second leg on 25 January 2009 at Fez Stadium in Morocco.

=== First leg ===
8 January 2009
13:30 GMT

| Club Africain (Tunisia) | 0 – 0 | (Morocco) FAR Rabat |

Stade Olympique d'El Menzah
Referee: (Algeria) Mohamed Benouza

=== Second leg ===
25 January 2009

| FAR Rabat (Morocco) | 0 – 0 (a.e.t.) (2 – 3 pen.) | (Tunisia) Club Africain |

Fez Stadium
Referee: (Egypt) Essam Abdelfattah

2008 North African Cup of Champions Winners
(Tunisia)
Club Africain
First title
