= 2009 African Nations Championship final =

Football match held in Ivory Coast

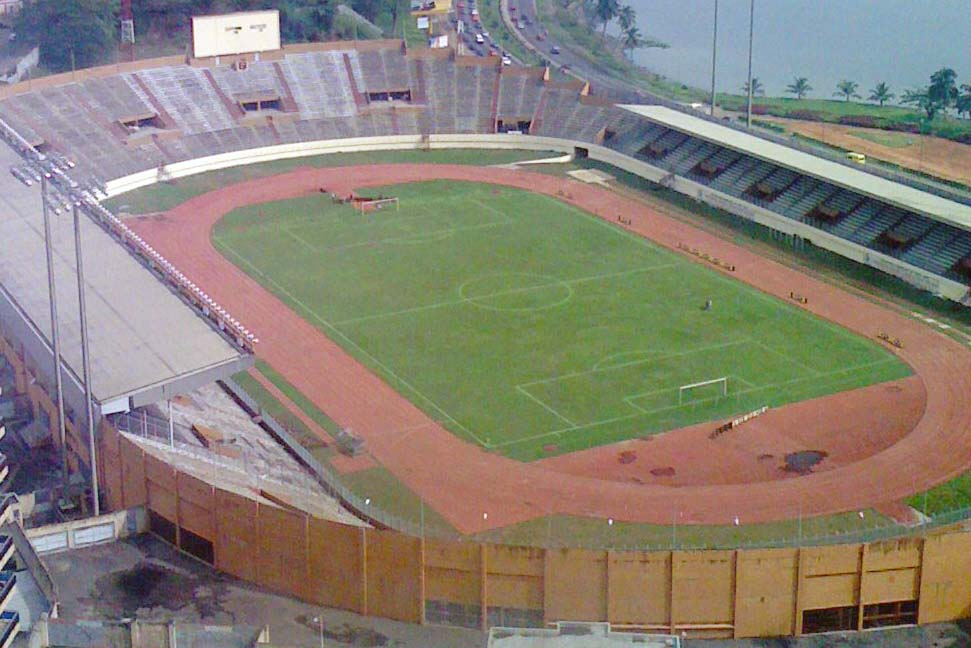
- The FHB Stadium hosts the final
- Event: 2009 African Nations Championship
Ghana	DR Congo
(Ghana)	(Democratic Republic of the Congo)
0	2
- Date: 8 March 2009
- Venue: Stade Félix Houphouët-Boigny, Abidjan
- Referee: Noumandiez Doué (Ivory Coast)
- Attendance: 35,000

The 2009 African Nations Championship final was a football match held on 8 March 2009, and was the culmination of the inaugural tournament organised by CAF, aimed at players playing in their domestic leagues. The final was contested by DR Congo and Ghana, who had met earlier in the group stage, where Ghana ran out 3–0 winners. However, this was not to be the case, as DR Congo comfortably won 2–0 to record their first triumph in a continental competition since the 1974 African Nations Cup, where, as Zaire, they defeated Zambia 2–0 in the replay

== Match details ==
8 March 2009
16:00

Ghana	0–2	DR Congo
	(Report)	46' Kaluyituka; 74' Bedi

Stade Félix Houphouët-Boigny, Abidjan
Attendance: 35,000
Referee: (Ivory Coast) Noumandiez Doué

=== Lineups ===
GHANA:
GK	1	Philemon MacCarthy
RB	2	Samuel Inkoom	(yellow card) 33'
CB	5	Ofosu Appiah
CB	21	Harrison Afful
LB	3	Daniel Nana Yeboah
CM	14	Charles Asampong Taylor	(substituted off) 79'
CM	18	Edmund Owusu Ansah
RM	7	Jordan Opoku	(substituted off) 83'
LM	8	Ibrahim Ayew
CF	9	Yaw Antwi	(substituted off) 71'
CF	23	Godwin Osei Bonsu
Substitutes:
FW	17	Francis Coffie	(substituted on) 71'
FW	10	Kwadwo Poku	(substituted on) 79'
FW	15	Stephen Manu	(substituted on) 83'
Manager:
(Serbia) Milovan Rajevac

DR CONGO:
GK	1	Muteba Kidiaba
CB	12	Bawaka Mabele
CB	18	Gladys Bokese (yellow card) 63'
CB	15	Joël Kimwaki
CM	6	Kazembe Mihayo
CM	13	Matondu Salakiaku (substituted off) 88'
RM	7	Ngandu Kasongu
LM	10	Mbenza Bedi
CF	8	Mabi Mputu
CF	14	Bongelli Lofo (c) (yellow card) 66'
CF	19	Dioko Kaluyituka
Substitutes:
FW	22	Luyeye Mvete (substituted on) 88'
Manager:
(Democratic Republic of the Congo) Mutumbile Santos

Man of the Match:
(Democratic Republic of the Congo) Mabi Mputu

Assistant referees:
(Niger) Peter Edibe
(Tunisia) Chokri Saadallah
Fourth official:
(Togo) Koko Djaoupé

Match rules:

- 90 minutes
- 30 minutes of extra time if scores level
- Penalty shoot-out if scores still level
- Of 12 substitutes named, 3 may be used
