= Rabo =

Rabo may refer to:

- Ali Rabo, a footballer from Burkina Faso
- Rabo Saminou, a footballer from Niger
- Various subsidiaries, brands, sports sponsorships etc. of Rabobank, a Dutch financial services group
