= Adou =

Adou is a surname. Notable people with the surname include:

- Robleh Ali Adou (born 1961), Djiboutian windsurfer
- Blaise Dago Adou (born 1985), Ivorian football defender
- Mouftaou Adou (born 1991), Beninese football defender
- Leygley Adou (born 1997), French soccer center-back of Vietnamese descent
- Kelvin Amian Adou (born 1998), French football right-back of Ivorian descent

== See also ==
- Liu Shan (207–271), widely known by his infant name Adou (阿斗), second and last emperor of the state of Shu Han during China's Three Kingdoms period
- Adou, a manga by Jaku Amano
