= Pisco Vuanga =

Congolese footballer

Personal information
- Full name: Pisco Vuanga Kwenda
- Date of birth: 12 September 1982 (age 44)
- Position: Goalkeeper

Senior career*
Years	Team	Apps	(Gls)
–2001	FC Les Stars		
2002–2003	AS Vita Club		
2004–?	FC Tornado		
2006–2008	SC Cilu		
2009	AS New Soger		

International career
2006	DR Congo	1	(0)
- * Club domestic league appearances and goals

Pisco Vuanga (born 12 September 1982) is a retired Congolese football goalkeeper.

He made his debut for DR Congo in a 2006 friendly against Tanzania. He was also a squad member for other friendly matches in 2006 and 2007 as well as the 2009 African Nations Championship.

He was later on the coaching staff of Maniema Union, leaving in 2021. He was then assistant manager of US Tshinkunku.
