= Makiadi Pambani =

Congolese footballer

Personal information
- Date of birth: 24 August 1985 (age 41)
- Place of birth: Kinshasa, Zaïre
- Position: Defender

Senior career*
Years	Team	Apps	(Gls)
2005–2009	AS New Soger		
2010–2003	AS Vita Club		
2013–2016	FC Saint-Éloi Lupopo		
2016–2018	FC Simba Kamikaze		

International career
2006	DR Congo	1	(0)
- * Club domestic league appearances and goals

Makiadi Pambani (born 24 August 1985) is a retired Congolese football defender.
