= Koforidua Sports Stadium =

Sports venue in Koforidua, Ghana

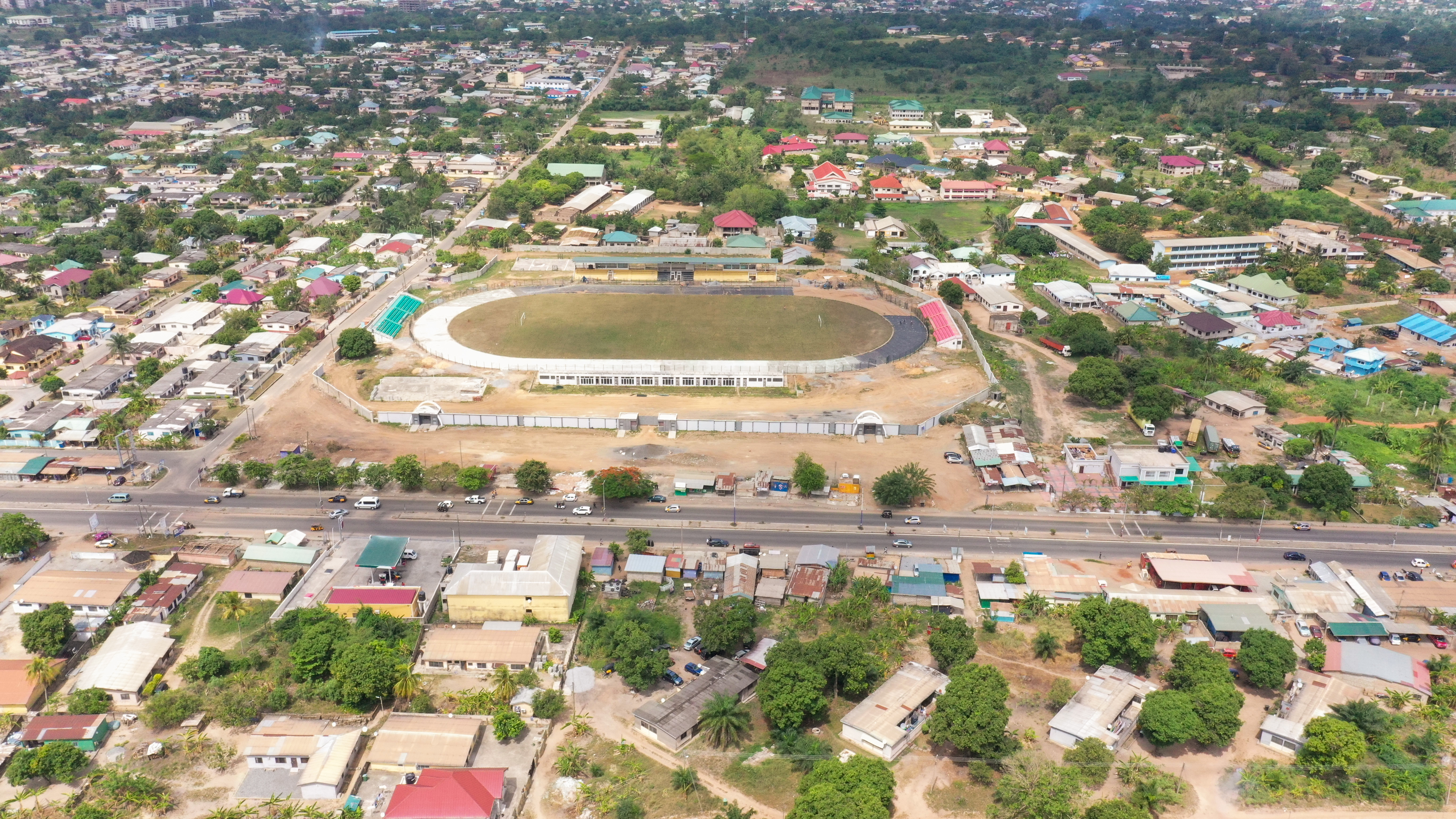
- Interactive map of Koforidua Sports Stadium
- Address: Koforidua, Eastern Region; Ghana
- Capacity: 5,000
- Current use: football

Construction
- Expanded: FIFA standard pitch, tennis court, taekwondo and badminton center, basketball and volleyball courts (planned)

Tenant
- Power FC

Koforidua Sports Stadium is suituated in Koforidua, the capital of Eastern Region in Ghana. It is used mostly for football matches and is the home stadium of Power FC. The stadium holds 5,000 people. It is the only sports stadium located in the Eastern Region. The Sports Minister, Hon. Isaac Kwame Asiamah has cut the sod for the upgrading of the Koforidua Sports Stadium to a modern standard sports facility. The project, according to the Minister, is part of the government's plan to build international-standard sports stadia. The sports stadium upgrading is part of the agenda of President Nana Addo Dankwa Akufo-Addo to ensure that all regions in the country have modern sporting facilities. The upgraded stadium will not only be a football pitch. It will have several facilities, including a FIFA standard pitch, a tennis court, a taekwondo and badminton centre, as well as a basketball and volleyball court. The sports stadium, after an upgrade, was renamed as the Koforidua Youth Resource Centre, which is a multi-purpose facility to nurture the youth in Koforidua and its environs. It was commissioned by President Nana Addo Dankwa Akuffo-Addo on 28th December 2023.
