= Losseny Doumbia =

Nigerien and Ivorian footballer

Personal information
- Date of birth: 5 April 1992 (age 34)
- Place of birth: Niger
- Position: Goalkeeper

Team information
- Current team: Chippa United
- Number: 1

Senior career*
Years	Team	Apps	(Gls)
2010	ASFAN		
2010–2012	Motema Pembe		
2012–	Chippa United		
- * Club domestic league appearances and goals as of July 1, 2014 ‡ National team caps and goals as of 00:00, 1 July 2014 (UTC)

Issa Losseny Doumbia (born April 5, 1992 in Ivory Coast) is a Nigerien and Ivorian football player who plays for Chippa United and the Niger national football team.

== Career ==
Losseny Doumbia began his career in the Niger club ASFAN. In 2010, he moved to Motema Pembe from Equatorial Guinea. Now goalkeeper stands for Premier League club South Africa Chippa United.

Issa was competing with Rabo Saminou to be Niger's second choice goalkeeper at the 2012 Africa Cup of Nations finals in Gabon and Equatorial Guinea. He also was called to the national team of Niger as a reserve goalkeeper for the 2014 African cup of the Nation qualification (CAN).
