= Stanley Banda =

Zambian footballer (born 1983)

Personal information
- Date of birth: 5 June 1983 (age 43)
- Place of birth: Lusaka, Zambia
- Height: 1.70 m (5 ft 7 in)
- Position: Midfielder

Senior career*
Years	Team	Apps	(Gls)
2003–2013	Red Arrows F.C.		
2014	National Assembly F.C.		
2015–2016	Mufulira Wanderers F.C.		

International career
2009	Zambia	1	(0)
- * Club domestic league appearances and goals

Stanley Banda (born 5 June 1983) is a retired Zambian football midfielder.
