= Mtshumayeli Moyo =

Zimbabwean footballer (born 1983)

Personal information
- Date of birth: 24 July 1983 (age 43)
- Position: Midfielder

Senior career*
Years	Team	Apps	(Gls)
2002–2004	Zimbabwe Saints F.C.		
2005–2008	Dynamos F.C.		
2009	Highlanders F.C.		
2009–2012	United Africa Tigers		
2012–2017	FC Saint-Éloi Lupopo		

International career
2004–2007	Zimbabwe	6	(1)
- * Club domestic league appearances and goals

Mtshumayeli Moyo (born 24 July 1983) is a retired Zimbabwean football midfielder.

== Career statistics ==
=== International ===
Appearances and goals by national team and year
National team	Year	Apps	Goals
Zimbabwe	2004	1	1
Zimbabwe	2005	1	0
Zimbabwe	2006	3	0
Zimbabwe	2007	1	0
Total		6	1

Scores and results list Zimbabwe's goal tally first, score column indicates score after each Moyo goal.

List of international goals scored by Mtshumayeli Moyo
No.	Date	Venue	Opponent	Score	Result	Competition
1	22 August 2004	National Sports Stadium, Harare, Zimbabwe	Uganda	1–0	2–0	Friendly
