= Power F.C. =

Power FC
- Full name: Power Football Club
- Ground: Koforidua Sports Stadium; Koforidua, Eastern Region, Ghana
- Capacity: 10,000
- Chairman: C.S. Tetteh
- Manager: Daniel Anue Mensah
- League: Division Two League
- 2006-07: 16th (Ghana Premier League)
Home colours	Away colours

Power FC is a Ghanaian professional football club based in Koforidua, Eastern Region. The club is competing in the Ghana Division Two League.

== History ==
The club was first promoted to the Ghana Premier League in 1997–98. They finished third from bottom in 2000, and were relegated after losing to Adansiman Obuasi in a play-off. However, they were promoted back to the Ghana Premier League in their first season back in Division One after beating Ghaphoa Readers 3–2 in a promotion playoff match. After finishing third from bottom again, they retained their place in the top flight after beating Mysterious Dwarfs 1–0.

The club had issue with management in the 2006–07 season, with head coach Bashiru Hayford noted as being regularly absent from training sessions, with the club then looking to Ebo Mends to lead them, although after arriving at the club, he decided not to take the role. The 2006–07 season ended with the club's relegation after they finished bottom of the league.

== Squad ==
Note: Flags indicate national team as defined under FIFA eligibility rules; some limited exceptions apply. Players may hold more than one non-FIFA nationality.

No.	Pos.	Nation	Player
—	DF	(Ghana) GHA	Kwabena Yaro
—	MF	(Ghana) GHA	George Appiah
—	MF	(Ghana) GHA	Mohammed Bello

No.	Pos.	Nation	Player
—	MF	(Ghana) GHA	Nii Ayi Tetteh
—	FW	(Ghana) GHA	Ronaldo Awudu
—	FW	(Ghana) GHA	Ernest Okyere

== Former coaches ==
- Ebo Mends
