= Raji Abdel-Aati =

Sudanese footballer

Personal information
- Full name: Raji Abdel-Aati Abdallah
- Date of birth: October 11, 1985 (age 41)
- Place of birth: Sudan
- Height: 1.73 m (5 ft 8 in)
- Position: Midfielder

Senior career*
Years	Team	Apps	(Gls)
2006	Kober SC (Bahri)		
2007-2008	Al Ahli SC (Khartoum)		
2009-2017	Al-Merrikh SC		
2018	Hay Al Wadi SC (Nyala)		
2018-2020	Kober SC (Bahri)		

International career
2008-2016	Sudan	18	(0)
Medal record
Men's football
Representing Sudan
African Nations Championship
Third place	2011 Sudan
- * Club domestic league appearances and goals

Raji Abdel-Aati is a Sudanese football midfielder for the Sudanese giants El-Merreikh. He is a member of the Sudan national football team. He was brought from Ahli Al Khartoum in December 2008 to El-Merreikh. He scored his first goal for El-Merreikh in a friendly match against Al-Wakra of Qatar in Qatar from a penalty in which the visitors won 0:2.

== Honours ==
Sudan

- African Nations Championship: 3rd place, 2011
