= Issam Badda =

Moroccan footballer

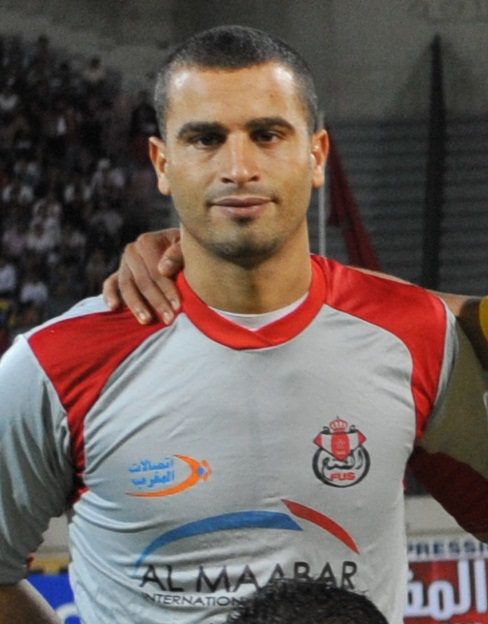
- Issam Badda with Fath Rabat

Personal information
- Full name: Issam Badda
- Date of birth: 10 May 1983 (age 43)
- Place of birth: Khemisset, Morocco
- Height: 1.89 m (6 ft 2 in)
- Position: Goalkeeper

Youth career
- 2000–2005: IZK Khemisset

Senior career*
Years	Team	Apps	(Gls)
2005–2010	IZK Khemisset		
2010–2015	FUS Rabat		
2015–2016	Kawkab Marrakech		
2016–2017	IR Tanger	6	(0)

International career^{‡}
2008–2012	Morocco	1	(0)
- * Club domestic league appearances and goals as of 00:00, 1 July 2017 (UTC) ‡ National team caps and goals as of 10 August 2012

Issam Badda (born 10 May 1983 in Khemisset, Morocco) is a Moroccan footballer who plays as a goalkeeper. He is currently a free agent. He was part of the Moroccan squad at the 2012 Africa Cup of Nations. At the finals, Badda was diagnosed with a form of malaria.
