= Joshua Titima =

Zambian footballer (born 1992)

Personal information
- Date of birth: 20 October 1992 (age 34)
- Place of birth: Kitwe, Zambia
- Height: 1.87 m (6 ft 2 in)
- Position: Goalkeeper

Team information
- Current team: Mufulira Wanderers

Senior career*
Years	Team	Apps	(Gls)
2011–2020	Power Dynamos		
2020–	Mufulira Wanderers		

International career^{‡}
2012–	Zambia	5	(0)
- * Club domestic league appearances and goals as of 08:13, 19 August 2020 (UTC)~ ‡ National team caps and goals as of 08:13, 19 August 2020 (UTC)

Joshua Titima (born 20 October 1992) is a Zambian international footballer who plays for Mufulira Wanderers, as a goalkeeper.

== Career ==
Titima has played club football for Power Dynamos.

He made his international debut for Zambia in 2012. He was Zambia's third choice goalkeeper and the 2012 Africa Cup of Nations was his first Africa Cup of Nations, but he did not play any games. He was named in Zambia's provisional squad for the 2013 Africa Cup of Nations, and later made the final squad.
