= Mansour Al Borki =

Libyan football midfielder (born 1985)

Personal information
- Full name: Mansour Ehmed Al Borki
- Date of birth: July 3, 1985 (age 41)
- Place of birth: Tripoli, Libya
- Position: Midfielder

Youth career
- Al-Ittihad

Senior career*
Years	Team	Apps	(Gls)
2005–2007	Al-Ittihad	19	(1)
2008–2011	Aljazeera Sports Club	?	(?)
2011–2013	JS Kairouan	33	(2)

International career^{‡}
2009–2013	Libya	7	(0)
- * Club domestic league appearances and goals as of January 27, 2007 ‡ National team caps and goals as of March 20, 2016

Mansour Al Borki (Arabic: منصور البركي) (born July 3, 1985) is a Libyan football midfielder who has played top-level football in the leagues of Libya and Tunisia and plays internationally for Libya.

Al Borki was a member of the Libya squad at the 2009 African Championship of Nations, but did not appear in any matches at the finals.
