= Jean-Maxime Ndongo =

Footballer (born 1992)

Jean-Maxime Eyama Ndongo (born 8 November 1992) is a footballer who plays as a midfielder for Equatoguinean Premier League club Futuro Kings. Before, he played for Deportivo Mongomo, Racing Micomeseng and Akonangui FC. Born in Cameroon, he capped for the Equatorial Guinea national team at international level.

== International career ==
Ndongo was a member of the Equatorial Guinea national team. He was part of the squad at the 2012 Africa Cup of Nations.

== Honours ==
Racing de Micomeseng

- National League First Division: 2015
