= Perry Mubanga =

Zambian footballer (born 1983)

Perry Mubanga (born 10 October 1983) is a Zambian football defender.

== Career ==
He was born in Kitwe. He played for Kitwe United (2001–2004), Power Dynamos (2004–2011), Nkana (2011–2012) and ZESCO United (2012–2012). He was a part of the Zambian 2009 African Nations Championship team.
