= Ahmed Al Alwani =

Libyan footballer (born 1981)

Ahmed Al Alwani (Arabic: أحمد العلواني)
Personal information
- Date of birth: 19 August 1981 (age 45)
- Height: 1.84 m (6 ft 0 in)
- Position: Defender

Senior career*
Years	Team	Apps	(Gls)
2004–2010	Al-Madina Tripoli		
2010–2011	Al-Ittihad Club		
2011–2013	Al-Madina Tripoli		
2013–2015	Al-Ahly SC		

International career
2011–2014	Libya	11	(0)
Medal record
Men's football
Representing Libya
African Nations Championship
Winner	2014 South Africa
- * Club domestic league appearances and goals

Ahmed Al-Alwani (Arabic: أحمد العلواني; born 19 August 1981) is a Libyan footballer who plays for Ahly Benghazi as a defensive midfielder. He is a member of the Libyan national football team, and was called up to the 2012 Africa Cup of Nations as a reserve player.

== Honours ==
Libya

- African Nations Championship: 2014
