= Achille Pensy =

Equatoguinean footballer (born 1987)

Personal information
- Full name: Achille Pensy Moukembe
- Date of birth: 5 January 1987 (age 39)
- Place of birth: Miang (Bonaléa), Cameroon
- Position: Goalkeeper

Youth career
- 2001: Dream Team de Douala

Senior career*
Years	Team	Apps	(Gls)
2006–2007	Akonangui		
2008–2009	The Panthers		
2010–2011	Deportivo Mongomo		
2011–2015	The Panthers		
2016	Racing de Micomeseng		
2018	Deportivo Niefang		

International career
2001	Cameroon U17		
2009–2010	Equatorial Guinea	4	(0)
- * Club domestic league appearances and goals

Achille Pensy Moukembe (born 5 January 1987) is a former footballer who played as a goalkeeper.

Born and raised in Cameroon to Cameroonian parents, Pensy has played in the Equatorial Guinean league and subsequently capped for the Equatorial Guinea national team.

== Career ==
=== International career ===
Pensy was a member of Cameroon at the 2001 African U-17 Championship and the 2001 Meridian Cup.

While playing in the Equatoguinean First Division, he was naturalized and began to be called constantly by Equatorial Guinea. Pensy appeared as a substitute in three matches for the 2010 FIFA World Cup qualifiers in 2008. He played against Mali and Estonia in 2009 and against Morocco and Botswana in 2010.

Also, Pensy played in unofficial matches against Ivory Coast, at the 2009 and 2010 CEMAC Cup and against the French club FC Issy-les-Moulineaux.
