= David Kutyauripo =

Zimbabwean footballer (born 1979)

Personal information
- Date of birth: 7 March 1979 (age 47)
- Place of birth: Zimbabwe
- Position: Defender

Senior career*
Years	Team	Apps	(Gls)
2003–2005	Njube Sundowns		
2005–2006	APOP Kinyras Peyias	22	(0)
2006	Dynamos		
2007–2008	CAPS United		
2008	Monomotapa United		
2009	CAPS United		
2009	Shooting Stars		
2010–2012	Dynamos		

International career
2006–2008	Zimbabwe	13	(0)
- * Club domestic league appearances and goals

David Kutyauripo (born 7 March 1979) is a Zimbabwean former international footballer who last played as a defender for Dynamos.

== Career ==
Kutyauripo began his career in 2003 with Njube Sundowns, and spent the 2005–06 season with Cypriot side APOP Kinyras Peyias, making 22 league appearances. After returning to Zimbabwe in 2006, Kutyauripo has played with Dynamos, CAPS United, Monomotapa United and Shooting Stars. On 20 October 2012 was banned for ten years for match fixing.
