= Koko'o =

Cameroonian footballer

Personal information
- Full name: Pierre Bilal Koko'o Lotti Abalintsina
- Date of birth: January 18, 1986 (age 40)
- Place of birth: Ebolowa, Cameroon
- Height: 1.86 m (6 ft 1 in)
- Position: Striker

Youth career
- Kalima Yaoundé
- Tonnerre Yaoundé
- Accfoot
- Vogt Athletic

Senior career*
Years	Team	Apps	(Gls)
2004–2005	Cotonsport Garoua		
2005–2006	Mamelodi Sundowns		
2006–2007	Tonnerre Yaoundé		
2007	Université FC de Ngaoundéré		
2008	ASEC Mimosas		
2008–2011	Moghreb Tétouan		
2009–2010	→ Al Ahly Tripoli (loan)	5	(2)
2010–2011	→ Al-Ittihad Aleppo (loan)		
2011–2012	COD Meknès	9	(0)
2012	JIPPO	17	(3)
- * Club domestic league appearances and goals as of January 4, 2013

Pierre Bilal Koko'o Lotti Abalintsina (born January 18, 1986, in Ebolowa), known as Koko'o, is a Cameroonian football player last played for Finnish side JIPPO.

== Career ==
Koko'o always had a reputation for scoring goals, and this earned him several moves throughout his career. Prior to his move to Al Ahly Tripoli, the Cameroonian topped the Botola scoring charts with 17 goals in 21 games for Moghreb Tétouan. He signed a five-year deal with Al Ahly Tripoli, the first year being a loan, believed to be worth $800,000, 40 times the $20,000 Moghreb Tétouan paid for him a year earlier to sign him from ASEC Mimosas.

== Honours ==
- Côte d'Ivoire Cup 2007 – Winner
- Côte d'Ivoire Premier Division 2007 – Runner-up
