= Godwin Osei Bonsu =

Ghanaian footballer (born 1989)

Personal information
- Date of birth: 3 March 1989 (age 37)
- Place of birth: Accra, Ghana
- Height: 1.90 m (6 ft 3 in)
- Position: Centre-back

Senior career*
Years	Team	Apps	(Gls)
2008–2009	Hearts of Oak		
2009	Hapoel Ra'anana	0	(0)
2009–2013	Hearts of Oak		
2009	→ AEP Paphos (loan)	0	(0)
2013–2014	Radnik Surdulica	20	(0)
2014–2015	Radnički Kragujevac	16	(0)
2015–2022	Gaborone United		

International career
2009	Ghana	5	(0)
- * Club domestic league appearances and goals as of 18 May 2015

Godwin Osei Bonsu (born 3 March 1989) is a Ghanaian professional footballer who most recently played as a centre-back for Gaborone United.

== Club career ==
Osei Bonsu started in Hearts of Oak from his home town Accra. He played for Hearts of Oak from 2008 to 2013 with a short time spent in Hapoel Ra'anana where he played two cup matches. In summer 2009, after winning silver with Ghana at the African Nations Championship, Hearts of Oak reached an agreement with AEK Paphos to loan him to the Cypriot team in a one-year loan, however Bonsu soon returned without making a league debut. After returning to Hearts of Oak, Bonsu became part of the 2011–12 Ghanaian Premier League team of the season.

In summer 2013 he moved in Serbia, in Radnik Surdulica. After season and 20 games for club, he moved to Radnički Kragujevac next summer. He played his first official match for Radnički Kragujevac in Serbian Cup against Jagodina on 29 October, and he made his Serbian SuperLiga debut against OFK Beograd on 2 November 2014.

== International career ==
Osei Bonsu played with Ghana in the 2009 African Nations Championship Final.

== Honours ==
Hearts of Oak

- Ghana Premier League: 2008–09

Ghana

- African Nations Championship runner-up: 2009

Individual

- Ghana Premier League team of the season: 2011–12
