= Daniel Vheremu =

Zimbabwean footballer (born 1985)

Personal information
- Date of birth: 18 March 1985 (age 41)
- Place of birth: Harare, Zimbabwe
- Height: 1.81 m (5 ft 11 in)
- Position: Defender

Team information
- Current team: Platinum (assistant coach)

Senior career*
Years	Team	Apps	(Gls)
2006–2009	Shooting Stars		
2010	Gunners		
2011–2015	Platinum		

International career^{‡}
2008–2012	Zimbabwe	12	(0)

Managerial career
- 2020-: Zimbabwe (assistant coach)
- * Club domestic league appearances and goals as of 15 November 2020 ‡ National team caps and goals as of 15 November 2020

Daniel Vheremu (born 18 March 1985) is a retired Zimbabwean football defender.
