= Gilbert Banda =

Zimbabwean footballer (born 1983)

Personal information
- Date of birth: May 30, 1983 (age 43)
- Place of birth: Bulawayo, Zimbabwe
- Position: Defender

Team information
- Current team: How Mine

Youth career
- Highlanders Juniors

Senior career*
Years	Team	Apps	(Gls)
2001–2012	Highlanders FC		
2013–	How Mine		

International career
2006–2010	Zimbabwe	8	(0)
- * Club domestic league appearances and goals

Gilbert Banda (born 30 May 1983 in Bulawayo) is a Zimbabwean former football player, who plays for How Mine and made 8 appearances for the Zimbabwe national team.

On 20 October 2012 Banda was banned from the sport for ten years for match fixing.
