= Obaid Khalifa =

Emirati footballer (born 1985)

Personal information
- Full name: Obaid Khalifa Mubarak Mesari
- Date of birth: April 13, 1985 (age 41)
- Place of birth: Fujairah, United Arab Emirates
- Height: 1.75 m (5 ft 9 in)
- Position: Center back

Senior career*
Years	Team	Apps	(Gls)
2006–2012	Al-Ahli		
2012–2013	→ Sharjah		
2013–2014	Ajman Club		

International career
2008–2009	UAE	7	(0)
- * Club domestic league appearances and goals

Obaid Khalifa Mubarak Mesari (born April 13, 1985) is an Emirati football player who plays for Al Sharjah SC.
