= Abednico Powell =

Motswana footballer

Abed Powell
Personal information
- Full name: Abednico Powell
- Date of birth: 28 January 1983 (age 43)
- Place of birth: Gaborone, Botswana
- Height: 1.78 m (5 ft 10 in)
- Position: Central midfielder

Senior career*
Years	Team	Apps	(Gls)
2006–2007	ECCO City Green		
2007–2010	Extension Gunners		
2010–2012	Township Rollers		
2013–	Mogoditshane Fighters		

International career
2007–2008	Botswana	1	(0)
- * Club domestic league appearances and goals

Abednico Powell (born 28 January 1983) is a Motswana footballer who currently plays for Mogoditshane Fighters.

== Career ==
Powell began his professional career in 2006 with ECCO City Green and signed in summer 2007 with Extension Gunners. He left in January 2010 to go to the league rival Township Rollers. He then left Township Rollers and signed with Mogoditshane Fighters.

=== International ===
Powell has won one cap for the Botswana national football team.
