= Othusitse Pilane =

Motswana footballer

Othusitse Pilane (born 26 February 1984) is a Motswana footballer who plays as a midfielder for the Botswana Premier League side Mochudi Centre Chiefs and the Botswana national football team.
