= Yanne Bidonga =

Gabonese footballer

Personal information
- Date of birth: 2 March 1979 (age 47)
- Place of birth: Bakoumba
- Position: Goalkeeper

Senior career*
Years	Team	Apps	(Gls)
2001–2022	AS Mangasport		

International career
2001–2013	Gabon	6	(0)
- * Club domestic league appearances and goals

Yanne Bidonga, also called Yann Bidonga (born 20 March 1979) is a Gabonese football goalkeeper who plays for AS Mangasport in Gabon Championnat National D1.

== Career ==
Born in Bakoumba, Bidonga has spent his entire career playing for Mangasport. He was selected the best goalkeeper in the Gabonese 2009–10 championship.

Bidonga has made several appearances for the Gabon national football team, and played at 2012 Africa Cup of Nations. He made his international debut as a substitute in a friendly again Mali on 18 March 2001.
