= Oscar Machapa =

Zimbabwean footballer (born 1987)

Personal information
- Date of birth: 1 June 1987 (age 39)
- Place of birth: Harare, Zimbabwe
- Height: 1.86 m (6 ft 1 in)
- Position: Midfielder

Team information
- Current team: CAPS United

Senior career*
Years	Team	Apps	(Gls)
2009–2010	CAPS United		
2010–2013	Moroka Swallows	53	(1)
2013–2015	Dynamos F.C.		
2015–2017	AS Vita Club		
2018–2019	CAPS United		

International career
2010–	Zimbabwe		
- * Club domestic league appearances and goals

Oscar Machapa (born 1 June 1987) is a retired Zimbabwean professional footballer who played as a midfielder or fullback for CAPS United, Moroka Swallows, Dynamos and AS Vitae Club.

== Parisei pazim ==
In January 2014, coach Ian Gorowa invited him to be part of the Zimbabwe squad for the 2014 African Nations Championship. He helped the team to a fourth-place finish after being defeated by Nigeria 1–0.
