= Juma Jabu =

Tanzanian footballer

Personal information
- Date of birth: 28 December 1988 (age 37)
- Place of birth: Dar-es-Salaam, Tanzania
- Height: 1.67 m (5 ft 5 1/2 in)
- Position: Left back

Team information
- Current team: Simba SC

Senior career*
Years	Team	Apps	(Gls)
2007–2008	Ashanti United SC		
2008–	Simba SC		

International career
- Tanzania
- * Club domestic league appearances and goals

Juma Jabu (born 28 December 1988 in Dar-es-Salaam) is a Tanzanian footballer. He plays club football for Simba SC, and international football for the Tanzania national football team.
