= Walid Al Sbaay =

Libyan footballer (born 1983)

Personal information
- Full name: Walid Jalal Al Sbaay
- Date of birth: 28 March 1983 (age 43)
- Place of birth: Libya
- Position: Centre back

Senior career*
Years	Team	Apps	(Gls)
2003–2011	Al-Ahly Tripoli		
2011–2013	Nejmeh SC	11	(0)
2013–2014	Al-Ahly Tripoli		

International career^{‡}
2005–2013	Libya	35	(3)
- * Club domestic league appearances and goals as of 1 September 2023 ‡ National team caps and goals as of 1 September 2023

Walid Al Sbaay (born 28 March 1983) is a Libyan retired footballer who played as a centre back.
