= Pride Tafirenyika =

Zimbabwean footballer (born 1984)

Personal information
- Date of birth: 21 January 1984 (age 42)
- Place of birth: Bindura, Zimbabwe
- Height: 1.87 m (6 ft 2 in)
- Position: Midfielder

Senior career*
| Years | Team | Apps | (Gls) |
| 2004–2007 | Harare United | | |
| 2008–2009 | Shooting Stars | | |
| 2010–2013 | CAPS United | | |
| 2014–2015 | ZPC Kariba | | |
| 2016 | Chicken Inn | | |
| 2018 | ZPC Kariba | | |

International career^{‡}
| 2008–2009 | Zimbabwe | 4 | (1) |
- * Club domestic league appearances and goals as of 15 November 2020 ‡ National team caps and goals as of 15 November 2020

Pride Tafirenyika (born 21 January 1984) is a retired Zimbabwean football midfielder.
