= Arafa Nakuaa =

Libyan footballer (born 1982)

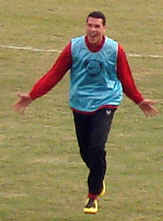

Personal information
- Full name: Arafa Ammar Nakuaa
- Date of birth: January 23, 1982 (age 44)
- Place of birth: Tripoli, Libya
- Height: 1.84 m (6 ft 0 in)
- Position: Midfielder

Team information
- Current team: Al-Ittihad
- Number: 7

Youth career
- Al-Ittihad

Senior career*
Years	Team	Apps	(Gls)
2006–07	Al Madina	10	(1)
2007–present	Al-Ittihad	9	(1)

International career
2009–	Libya		
- * Club domestic league appearances and goals as of January 27, 2007

Arafa Ammar Nakuaa (Arabic: عرفه الناكوع) (born 23 January 1982) is a Libyan footballer who plays as a midfielder for Al-Ittihad.

Nakuaa plays for the Libya national football team and made two substitute appearances at the 2009 African Championship of Nations
