= Almamy Sogoba =

Malian footballer

Almamy Sogoba (born 13 September 1987) is a Malian football goalkeeper.

He played for Djoliba AC until 2008. He then moved to AS Real Bamako, where he became club captain, and won the Malian Cup in 2010.
