= Salum Swedi =

Tanzanian footballer

Personal information
- Full name: Salum Khamis Swedi
- Date of birth: 3 December 1980 (age 45)
- Place of birth: Kigoma, Tanzania
- Height: 1.82 m (6 ft 0 in)
- Position: Central defender

Senior career*
Years	Team	Apps	(Gls)
2001–2005	Young Africans	84	(11)
2006–2009	Mtibwa Sugar	61	(4)
2009–2010	Azam		
2010–2014	Mtibwa Sugar		
2014–2015	Mwadui United		

International career^{‡}
2005–2010	Tanzania	46	(2)
- * Club domestic league appearances and goals as of 14 April 2021 ‡ National team caps and goals as of 14 April 2021

Salum Swedi (born 3 December 1980) is a retired Tanzanian footballer.

He played international football for Tanzania. On 19 February 2010 he announced his retirement from international football.
