= Ifeanyi Frederick Onuigbo =

Nigerian footballer

Ifeanyi Onuigbo
Personal information
- Full name: Ifeanyi Frederick Onuigbo
- Date of birth: November 22, 1989 (age 36)
- Place of birth: Lagos, Nigeria
- Position: Striker

Team information
- Current team: Hanoi T&T F.C.
- Number: 20

Senior career*
Years	Team	Apps	(Gls)
2007	Heartland F.C.	2	(0)
2008	Al-Hilal Omdurman	12	(5)
2009–2012	Ahly Benghazi	15	(0)
2012–	Hanoi T&T F.C.		

International career
2007	Nigeria Beach		
- * Club domestic league appearances and goals as of 17:04, 22 December 2009 (UTC)

Ifeanyi Frederick Onuigbo (born November 22, 1989, in Lagos) is a Nigerian footballer, currently playing as a striker for Hanoi T&T F.C.

== Career ==
He started his career with Heartland F.C. He signed than for Hilal in Sudan, before moving to Ahly in January 2009.

He was named by goal.com in their African Leagues' Team of the Week for his performance against CS Sfaxien in the first leg of the North African Cup Winners Cup Final.

== International career ==
Onuigbo presented Nigeria at the FIFA Beach Soccer World Cup 2007 in Brazil.
