= Mouchid Iyane Ly =

Senegalese footballer

Mouchid Ly
Personal information
- Full name: Mouchid Iyane Ly
- Date of birth: December 28, 1986 (age 39)
- Place of birth: Saint Louis, Senegal
- Position: Striker

Team information
- Current team: Al-Ittihad
- Number: 19

Youth career
- 2004–2006: Espoir Saint Louis

Senior career*
Years	Team	Apps	(Gls)
2007–2010	ASC Linguère	32	(15)
2009	→ Shenzhen Shangqingyin (loan)	20	(3)
2010–	Al-Ittihad		

International career
2009	Senegal U-23	10	(6)
- * Club domestic league appearances and goals

Mouchid Iyane Ly (born December 28, 1986, Saint-Louis, Senegal) is a professional Senegalese football player, who currently plays for Al-Ittihad.

== Career ==
Ly began his career with Espoir Saint Louis and joined 2007 to city rival ASC Linguère. After three years with ASC Linguère in the Senegal Premier League was in January 2009 loaned out to Shenzhen Shangqingyin.

== International career ==
He was a member of Senegal national football team for 2009 African Championship of Nations.
