= Guma Mousa =

Libyan footballer (born 1978)

Guma Mousa (born 1 January 1978 in Libya) is a Libyan footballer who plays for Al-Ahly Tripoli as a goalkeeper. He is a member of Libya national football team, played at 2012 Africa Cup of Nations as a reserve player.
