= Ahmed Salama =

Egyptian footballer (born 1981)

Personal information
- Date of birth: 5 February 1981 (age 45)
- Place of birth: Abu Kabir, Egypt
- Height: 1.81 m (5 ft 11 in)
- Position: Striker

Youth career
- 1997: Abu Kabir

Senior career*
Years	Team	Apps	(Gls)
2000-2006	El-Olympi	?	(?)
2006–2007	El Mansoura	?	(?)
2007–2008	Tersana	14	(6)
2008–2013	Haras El-Hodood	59	(8)
2013–2014	Al-Oruba	?	(?)
2014-2014	Wadi Degla	11	(1)
2014–2016	Al-Khabourah	?	(?)
2016–2017	Ala'ab Damanhour SC	?	(?)

International career
2007-2008	Egypt	3	(1)
- * Club domestic league appearances and goals

Ahmed Salama (Arabic: أحمد سلامة; born 5 February 1981) is an Egyptian footballer who plays for Al-Khabourah SC in Oman Professional League.

== Club career ==
Salama enjoyed a successful career at Tersana although it lasted for only one season. He scored 6 league goals in the 2007–08 Egyptian Premier League making him the top scorer of his team in that season beside Ahed Abdel Majeed, who had the same number of league goals. Due to this success, a number of Egyptian clubs expressed their interest in winning his services. It was Haras El-Hodood who eventually announced his signing on a three-year contract with an undisclosed fee in July 2008.

== International career ==
Ahmed Salama was a part of the Egyptian squad that participated in the football competition of 2007 Pan Arab Games held in Egypt. His only goal in the competition was the opening goal against Sudan. The match ended with a 5-0 Egyptian win as Emad Moteb added the other 4 goals.

== Honors ==
=== Club ===
Haras El-Hodoud

- Egypt Cup: 2008–09, 2009–10
- Egyptian Super Cup: 2010
