= Elvis Meleka =

Zimbabwean footballer (born 1986)

Personal information
- Date of birth: 19 April 1986 (age 40)
- Place of birth: Harare, Zimbabwe
- Height: 1.75 m (5 ft 9 in)
- Position: Defender

Senior career*
Years	Team	Apps	(Gls)
2006–2007	Harare United		
2008–2009	Shooting Stars		
2009	Masvingo United		
2010–2011	Gunners		
2011–2014	Mochudi Centre Chiefs		
2014–2016	ZPC Kariba		
2016–2018	Gilport Lions		
2017	→ Hwange		
2018–2019	Mochudi Centre Chiefs		

International career^{‡}
2008–2010	Zimbabwe	6	(0)
- * Club domestic league appearances and goals as of 14 November 2020 ‡ National team caps and goals as of 14 November 2020

Elvis Meleka (born 19 April 1986) is a Zimbabwean football defender.
