= Lassaâd Ouertani =

Tunisian footballer (1980–2013)

Lassaad Ouertani
Personal information
- Full name: Lassaâd Ouertani
- Date of birth: 2 May 1980
- Place of birth: Essen, Germany
- Date of death: 4 January 2013 (aged 32)
- Place of death: Tunis, Tunisia
- Height: 1.78 m (5 ft 10 in)
- Position: Defensive midfielder

Youth career
- 1994–2000: JS Kairouan

Senior career*
Years	Team	Apps	(Gls)
2000–2001	JS Kairouan		
2001–2004	Stade Tunisien		
2004–2009	Club Africain	52	(3)
2009	ES Zarzis		
2010–2013	JS Kairouan	5	(0)

International career^{‡}
2002–2007	Tunisia	6	(0)
- * Club domestic league appearances and goals as of 7 January 2013 ‡ National team caps and goals as of 7 January 2013

Lassaâd Ouertani aka "Zgaw" (2 May 1980 – 4 January 2013) was a Tunisian footballer who played for Jeunesse Sportive Kairouanaise, Stade Tunisien, Club Africain, ES Zarzis before returning to Jeunesse Sportive Kairouanaise.

He died in a traffic accident.
