= Pape Latyr N'Diaye =

Senegalese footballer

Personal information
- Date of birth: 30 November 1977 (age 48)
- Place of birth: Ouakam, Senegal
- Height: 1.93 m (6 ft 4 in)
- Position: Goalkeeper

Senior career*
Years	Team	Apps	(Gls)
1993–2002	Entente Sotrac		
2002–2006	AS Douanes		
2006–2014	US Ouakam		
- * Club domestic league appearances and goals

Pape Latyr N'Diaye (born 30 November 1977) is a Senegalese former professional footballer who played as a goalkeeper.

== Career ==
Born in Ouakam, N'Diaye began playing club football with local side Entente Sotrac in 1993. He joined AS Douanes in 2002, where he would win three consecutive Senegal FA Cup titles.

N'Diaye signed with US Ouakam in 2006 and captained the side that won the 2006 Senegal FA Cup, and the 2011 Senegal Premier League - the club's first league title in its 60-year history.

N'Diaye did not make an appearance for the Senegal national team, but was called up for a friendly against Benin on 7 February 2007. He was an unused reserve goalkeeper at the 2012 Africa Cup of Nations finals, the only squad member who played in the local league.
