= Carrington Gomba =

Zimbabwean footballer (born 1985)

Personal information
- Date of birth: 8 March 1985 (age 41)
- Place of birth: Hwange, Zimbabwe
- Height: 1.80 m (5 ft 11 in)
- Position: Midfielder

Team information
- Current team: Red Arrows

Senior career*
Years	Team	Apps	(Gls)
2004–2007	Wankie/Hwange		
2008	Gunners		
2009–?	Dynamos		
2012	Saint-Éloi		
2013–2018	CS Don Bosco		
2018–	Red Arrows		

International career^{‡}
2006–2009	Zimbabwe	10	(0)
- * Club domestic league appearances and goals as of 2 May 2023 ‡ National team caps and goals as of 2 May 2023

Carrington Gomba (born 8 March 1985) is a Zimbabwean football midfielder who currently plays for the Red Arrows.
