= Blaise Dago Adou =

Ivorian footballer

Blaise Dago
Personal information
- Full name: Blaise Dago Adou
- Date of birth: 11 March 1985 (age 41)
- Place of birth: Abidjan, Ivory Coast
- Height: 1.81 m (5 ft 11 1/2 in)
- Position: Defender

Team information
- Current team: Séwé Sports de San Pedro
- Number: 4

Youth career
- 2000–2003: U.S. Koumassi

Senior career*
Years	Team	Apps	(Gls)
2004–2006	Sabé Sports de Bouna		
2007–2008	Issia Wazi		
2009–	Séwé Sports de San Pedro		
- * Club domestic league appearances and goals

Blaise Dago Adou (born 3 November 1985, in Abidjan) is an Ivorian football defender playing for Séwé Sports de San Pedro.

== International career ==
Adou was selected Ivory Coast national football team the 2009 African Championship of Nations 2009 in Ivory Coast.
