= Francis Coffie =

Ghanaian international footballer

Francis Cofie
Personal information
- Full name: Francis Coffie
- Date of birth: September 20, 1989 (age 37)
- Place of birth: Accra, Ghana
- Height: 1.74 m (5 ft 8 1/2 in)
- Positions: Striker; winger

Youth career
- Power F.C.

Senior career*
| Years | Team | Apps | (Gls) |
| 2005–2007 | Power F.C. | | |
| 2007–2010 | Asante Kotoko | | |
| 2010–2011 | CD Leganés | | |
| 2011–2012 | Medeama SC | 12 | (8) |
| 2012–2015 | Ashanti Gold | 16 | (4) |
| 2015–2016 | Al-Merrikh SC | 14 | (11) |
| 2017 | Al-Watani | | |

International career
| 2009 | Ghana | 9 | (4) |
- * Club domestic league appearances and goals

Francis Coffie (born September 20, 1989, in Accra) is a Ghanaian international footballer.

== Career ==
Coffie began his career for Power F.C. and joined in August 2007 to Asante Kotoko. In July 2010, he began his career for CD Leganés.

== International career ==
He was called up for the Black Stars for a friendly game against Argentina national football team and marked in the game on 1 October 2009 his debut.
