= Omar Daoud =

Libyan footballer (1983–2018)

Personal information
- Date of birth: 9 April 1983
- Date of death: 9 May 2018 (aged 35)
- Position(s): Defender

Omar Daoud (9 April 1983 – 9 May 2018) was a Libyan professional footballer who played as a defender. He was an international for the Libya national team, and was best known for playing for Libyan club Al Ahli Tripoli and Algerian club JS Kabylie.

== Death ==
He died on 9 May 2018 in a car accident near his home town Shahhat, Libya.
