= Rabo Saminou =

Nigerien footballer

Personal information
- Full name: Rabo Kabara Saminou Gado
- Date of birth: 23 May 1986 (age 40)
- Place of birth: Agadez, Niger
- Height: 1.82 m (5 ft 11 1/2 in)
- Position: Goalkeeper

Team information
- Current team: Sahel SC

Youth career
- 1998–2002: Sahel SC

Senior career*
Years	Team	Apps	(Gls)
2004–2006	Sahel SC		
2007–2009	Enyimba International		
2010	Cotonsport Garoua		
2010	FUS Rabat	0	(0)
2011–	Sahel SC		

International career
2006–	Niger	9	(0)
- * Club domestic league appearances and goals

Rabo Kabara Saminou Gado (born 23 May 1986 in Agadez) is a Nigerien footballer who for FUS Rabat. He is also the member of Niger national team.

== Career ==
Saminou began his career in Niger with Sahel SC and scored his only goal in SuperCup final 2006 against AS-FNIS. After three years with the first team of Sahel SC in the Championnat national de première division joined in January 2007 to Nigerian top club Enyimba International F.C. He played in his three years 23 games for Enyimba International F.C. and signed in January 2010 for Cotonsport Garoua. He is right-footed, 182 cm tall, and has 79 kg.

== International career ==
Saminou has made several appearances for the Niger national football team, making his debut in 2006.
