= Ali Rahuma =

Libyan footballer (born 1982)

Personal information
- Full name: Ali Khalifa Rahuma
- Date of birth: May 16, 1982 (age 44)
- Place of birth: Tripoli, Libya
- Height: 1.69 m (5 ft 7 in)
- Position: Attacking midfielder

Youth career
- Hai Al Akwakh

Senior career*
Years	Team	Apps	(Gls)
2003–04	Al Ahly Tripoli	?	(?)
2004–2016	Al-Ittihad	?	(?)

International career
	Libya	7	(1)
- * Club domestic league appearances and goals as of January 27, 2007

Ali Khalifa Rahuma (Arabic: علي ارحومه) (born May 16, 1982) is a Libyan football midfielder, also a Libyan national. He currently plays for Al-Ittihad, and is a member of the Libya national football team.

Year	Team	Min. Played	Appearances	Subs. In	Subs. Out	Subs. on Bench	Goals	Penalty Goals	Yellow Cards.	Red Cards.
2011	Libya	64	1	0	1	0	0	0	0	0
