= Daniel Nana Yeboah =

Ghanaian footballer

Daniel Yeboah
Personal information
- Full name: Daniel Nana Yeboah
- Date of birth: 20 July 1984 (age 42)
- Place of birth: Accra, Ghana
- Height: 1.77 m (5 ft 10 in)
- Position: Midfielder

Youth career
- 2000–2001: Liberty Professionals

Senior career*
Years	Team	Apps	(Gls)
2002	Liberty Professionals	38	(0)
2003–2007	Asante Kotoko	90	(5)
2006	→ Al-Nejmeh (loan)	3	(1)
2007–2008	Liberty Professionals	29	(4)
2008–2010	Heart of Lions	45	(9)
2010–2011	Al-Masry	13	(0)
2011–2012	Haras El-Hodood	5	(0)
2012–2013	Al Ittihad	2	(0)
Total		225	(19)

International career
2002–2008	Ghana	8	(0)
- * Club domestic league appearances and goals

Daniel Nana Yeboah (born 20 July 1984) is a Ghanaian former professional footballer who played as a defensive midfielder. Between 2002 and 2008, he made six appearances for the Ghana national team.

== Club career ==
In July 2012, Yeboah joined Egyptian side Al Ittihad on a two-year contract.

== International career ==
Yeboah was a member of the Ghana national team. He made his debut for the Black Stars in 2002, was inactive for four years and was recalled for the game on 11 October 2008 against Lesotho.
