= Riyadh al Laafi =

Libyan footballer

Reyad Ellafi
Personal information
- Full name: Reyad Ellafi
- Date of birth: July 5, 1983 (age 43)
- Place of birth: Tripoli, Libya
- Height: 1.69 m (5 ft 7 in)
- Position: Left midfielder

Team information
- Current team: Al-Ittihad
- Number: 24

Youth career
- Al Ahly T.

Senior career*
| Years | Team | Apps | (Gls) |
| 1996–2002 | Al Ahly T. | ? | (?) |
| 2002–2006 | Al Madina | ? | (?) |
| 2007 | Al Naser | ? | (?) |
| 2008– | Al-Ittihad | ? | (?) |

International career
| | Libya | 8 | (0) |
- * Club domestic league appearances and goals as of January 27, 2007

Reyad Ellafi (Arabic: رياض اللافي; born 5 July 1980) is a Libyan footballer. He currently plays for Al-Ittihad.

Ellafi is also a member of the Libya national football team, and played in the 2009 African Championship of Nations.
