= Osama Mohamed El Fezzani =

Libyan footballer (born 1978)

Osama Mohammad El-Fezzani (born 23 February 1978) is a Libyan football attacker.

== Clubs ==
- (Libya) Al Ahly Tripoli
- (Libya) Al Madina Tripoli
- (Libya) Rafik Sorman
