= AS New Soger =

- Full name: AS New Soger
- Ground: Stade de la Kenya; Lubumbashi, DR Congo
- Capacity: 20,000
- League: Linafoot Ligue 2

AS New Soger is a football club in Lubumbashi, Democratic Republic of Congo. They play in the Linafoot Ligue 2, the second level of professional football in DR Congo.
