= Mohamed Esnany =

Libyan footballer (born 1984)

Mohammad Esnaani محمد الصنانى
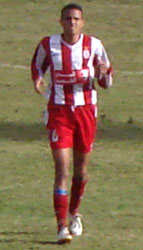
- Esnany in 2007

Personal information
- Full name: Mohammad Ali Jum'aa Esnaani
- Date of birth: May 13, 1984 (age 42)
- Place of birth: Tripoli, Libya
- Height: 1.71 m (5 ft 7 in)
- Position: Midfielder

Youth career
- Ittihad Tripoli S.C.

Senior career*
Years	Team	Apps	(Gls)
2004–2011	Ittihad Tripoli S.C.		
2011–2013	US Monastir	14	(0)
2013	CA Bizertin		

International career
2005–2012	Libya	15	(1)
Medal record
Men's football
Representing Libya
Arab Cup
Runner-up	2012 Saudi Arabia
Mediterranean Games
Bronze medal – third place	2005 Spain
- * Club domestic league appearances and goals as of May 29, 2013

Mohammad Ali Jum'aa Esnaani (Arabic: محمد على جمعة الصنانى) (born May 13, 1984) is a Libyan football midfielder. He currently plays for Tunisian club CA Bizertin.

Esnany is also a member of the Libya national football team, and was part of the Libyan Olympic squad that won the bronze medal in the 2005 Mediterranean Games.

== Honours ==
Libya

- Arab Cup: runner-up, 2012
- Mediterranean Games: bronze medalist, 2005
