= 2015 Africa Cup of Nations knockout stage =

The knockout stage of the 2015 Africa Cup of Nations was the second and final stage of the competition, following the group stage. It began on 31 January with the round of 16 and ended on 8 February 2015 with the final held at the Estadio de Bata in Bata. A total of 8 teams (the top two teams from each group) advanced to the knockout stage to compete in a single-elimination style tournament.

All match times are local, WAT (UTC+1).

== Format ==
In the knockout stage, except for the third place play-off, if a match was level at the end of 90 minutes of normal playing time, extra time was played (two periods of 15 minutes each). If still tied after extra time, the match was decided by a penalty shoot-out to determine the winner. In the third place play-off, if the scores remained level after 90 minutes the match would go directly to a penalty shoot-out, without any extra time being played.

== Qualified teams ==
The top two placed teams from each of the four groups advanced to the knockout stage.

Group	Winners	Runners-up
A	Congo	Equatorial Guinea
B	Tunisia	DR Congo
C	Ghana	Algeria
D	Ivory Coast	Guinea

== Bracket ==
Quarter-finals
31 January – Bata
Congo	2
DR Congo	4
1 February – Malabo
Ivory Coast	3
Algeria	1
1 February – Malabo
Ghana	3
Guinea	0
31 January – Bata
Tunisia	1
Equatorial Guinea (a.e.t.)	2

Semi-finals
4 February – Bata
DR Congo	1
Ivory Coast	3
5 February – Malabo
Ghana	3
Equatorial Guinea	0

Final
8 February – Bata
Ivory Coast (p)	0 (9)
Ghana	0 (8)
Third place play-off
7 February – Malabo
DR Congo (p)	0 (4)
Equatorial Guinea	0 (2)

All times local, WAT (UTC+1).

== Quarter-finals ==
=== Congo vs DR Congo ===
Congo took the lead in the 55th minute, when Férébory Doré met Delvin N'Dinga's free kick to slot home. They increased the lead seven minutes later, when after they intercepted a DR Congo pass out of the defence, Thievy Bifouma scored from the rebound after Doré's shot was saved. DR Congo pulled a goal back in the 65th minute, when Dieumerci Mbokani converted from Yannick Bolasie's cross. The equalizer came ten minutes later when Jeremy Bokila scored from Cédric Makiadi's pass. DR Congo took the lead when Joël Kimwaki headed in Neeskens Kebano's free kick in the 81st minute, and completed the comeback after Mbokani converted his own rebound to score his second goal of the match in the first minute of injury time. This put them in the semi-finals for the first time since 1998.

31 January 2015
17:00

Congo	2–4	DR Congo
Doré 55'; Bifouma 62'	Report	Mbokani 65', 90+1'; Bokila 75'; Kimwaki 81'

Estadio de Bata, Bata
Attendance: 31,670
Referee: Bernard Camille (Seychelles)

Congo	DR Congo

GK	1	Christoffer Mafoumbi
RB	18	Marvin Baudry
CB	21	Sagesse Babélé
CB	4	Boris Moubhibo
LB	6	Dimitri Bissiki
DM	8	Delvin N'Dinga	(yellow card) 83'
RW	12	Francis Litsingi		(substituted off) 84'
AM	7	Prince Oniangué (c)
LW	5	Bouka Moutou		(substituted off) 84'
CF	13	Thievy Bifouma
CF	10	Férébory Doré		(substituted off) 76'
Substitutions:
FW	19	Dominique Malonga		(substituted on) 76'
MF	14	Césaire Gandzé		(substituted on) 84'
FW	11	Fabrice Ondama		(substituted on) 84'
Manager:
(France) Claude Le Roy

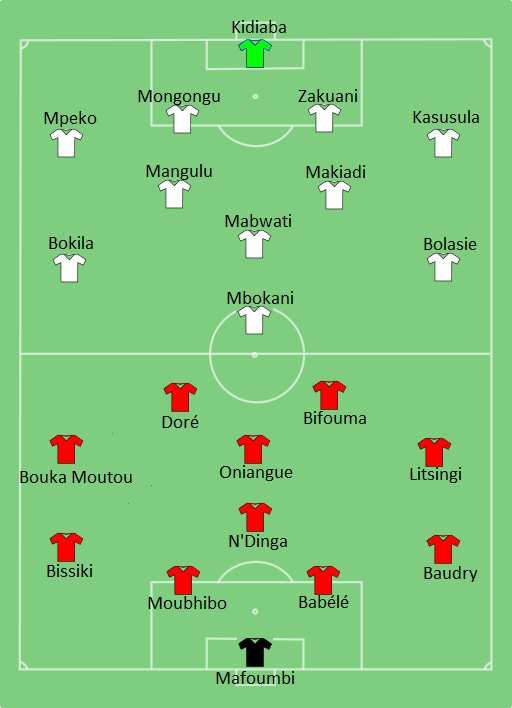

GK	1	Robert Kidiaba (c)
RB	2	Issama Mpeko
CB	17	Cédric Mongongu
CB	14	Gabriel Zakuani		(substituted off) 50'
LB	3	Jean Kasusula
CM	22	Chancel Mbemba
CM	6	Cédric Makiadi	(yellow card) 40'	(substituted off) 89'
RW	19	Jeremy Bokila
AM	18	Cedrick Mabwati		(substituted off) 66'
LW	11	Yannick Bolasie
CF	9	Dieumerci Mbokani
Substitutions:
DF	15	Joël Kimwaki		(substituted on) 50'
MF	10	Neeskens Kebano		(substituted on) 66'
MF	5	Nelson Munganga		(substituted on) 89'
Manager:
Florent Ibengé

Man of the Match:
Yannick Bolasie (DR Congo)

Assistant referees:
Djibril Camara (Senegal)
El Hadji Malick Samba (Senegal)
Fourth official:
Malang Diedhiou (Senegal)

=== Tunisia vs Equatorial Guinea ===
Tunisia took the lead in the 70th minute, when Ahmed Akaïchi flicked in Hamza Mathlouthi's cross from the right. Equatorial Guinea scored the equalizer in the third minute of injury time through Javier Balboa's penalty, which was awarded after Hamza Mathlouthi was ruled to have fouled Iván Bolado. The match went to extra time, and Balboa scored the winning goal in the 102nd minute with a direct free kick, sending the hosts to their first ever semi-finals. The match had witnessed controversies regarding the Mauritian referee's bias refereeing in favor to the host nation, including the controversial penalty in the final minutes, resulting with Tunisian players attacking him in the end of the game. CAF decided to ban the referee for life as for the result.

31 January 2015
20:30

Tunisia	1–2 (a.e.t.)	Equatorial Guinea
Akaïchi 70'	Report	Balboa 90+3' (pen.), 102'

Estadio de Bata, Bata
Attendance: 41,000
Referee: Rajindraparsad Seechurn (Mauritius)

Tunisia	Equatorial Guinea

GK	16	Aymen Mathlouthi
RB	17	Hamza Mathlouthi
CB	3	Aymen Abdennour
CB	2	Syam Ben Youssef
LB	12	Ali Maâloul
CM	20	Mohamed Ali Yacoubi	(yellow card) 63'	(substituted off) 104'
CM	6	Hocine Ragued	(yellow card) 9'
RW	19	Ahmed Akaïchi	(yellow card) 66'	(substituted off) 85'
AM	13	Ferjani Sassi	(yellow card) 90+6'
LW	9	Yassine Chikhaoui (c)
CF	18	Wahbi Khazri		(substituted off) 85'
Substitutions:
MF	15	Mohamed Ali Manser		(substituted on) 85'
FW	11	Amine Chermiti	(yellow card) 86'	(substituted on) 85'
MF	7	Youssef Msakni		(substituted on) 104'
Manager:
(Belgium) Georges Leekens

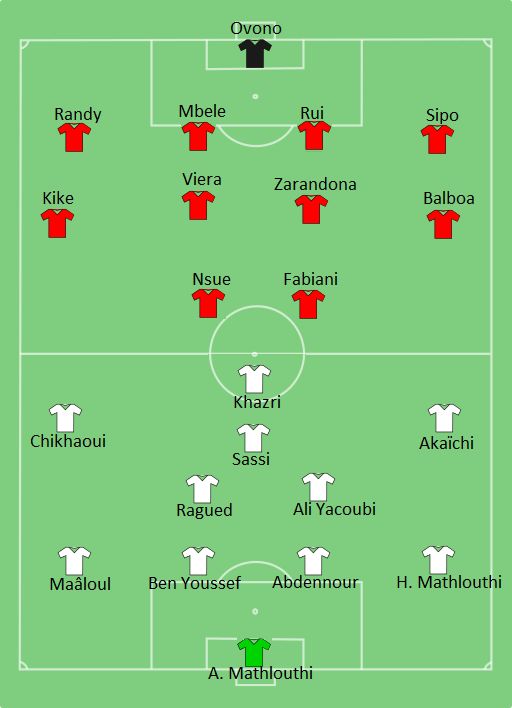

GK	1	Felipe Ovono
RB	8	Randy		(substituted off) 80'
CB	5	Diosdado Mbele
CB	4	Rui
LB	16	Sipo		(substituted off) 86'
RM	14	Kike
CM	18	Viera Ellong
CM	21	Iván Zarandona
LM	11	Javier Balboa
CF	10	Emilio Nsue (c)
CF	9	Raúl Fabiani		(substituted off) 61'
Substitutions:
FW	15	Ibán	(yellow card) 90+6'	(substituted on) 61'
FW	12	Iván Bolado		(substituted on) 80'
MF	7	Rubén Belima		(substituted on) 86'
Manager:
(Argentina) Esteban Becker

Man of the Match:
Javier Balboa (Equatorial Guinea)

Assistant referees:
Peter Edibe (Nigeria)
Jerson dos Santos (Angola)
Fourth official:
Koman Coulibaly (Mali)

=== Ghana vs Guinea ===
Ghana took the lead in the 4th minute, after André Ayew back-heeled the ball for Christian Atsu to convert from close range. Ghana increased the lead in the 44th minute, as Kwesi Appiah intercepted a missed pass from the Guinea defence to score. Atsu scored his second goal of the match in the 61st minute, when he received the ball from Mubarak Wakaso on the right flank, cut inside and curled the ball into the net. Guinea goalkeeper Naby Yattara was sent off in the fourth minute of injury time for bringing down Asamoah Gyan outside the penalty box. Ghana's win sent them to the semi-finals for the fifth consecutive tournament.

1 February 2015
17:00

Ghana	3–0	Guinea
Atsu 4', 61'; Appiah 44'	Report

Estadio de Malabo, Malabo
Attendance: 14,500
Referee: Janny Sikazwe (Zambia)

Ghana	Guinea

GK	1	Brimah Razak
RB	23	Harrison Afful
CB	21	John Boye
CB	19	Jonathan Mensah
LB	17	Baba Rahman
DM	6	Afriyie Acquah	(substituted off) 86'
RW	7	Christian Atsu	(substituted off) 79'
AM	11	Mubarak Wakaso
LW	10	André Ayew
CF	3	Asamoah Gyan (c)
CF	2	Kwesi Appiah
Substitutions:
MF	22	Frank Acheampong	(substituted on) 79'
MF	13	Mohammed Rabiu	(substituted on) 86'
Manager:
(Israel) Avram Grant

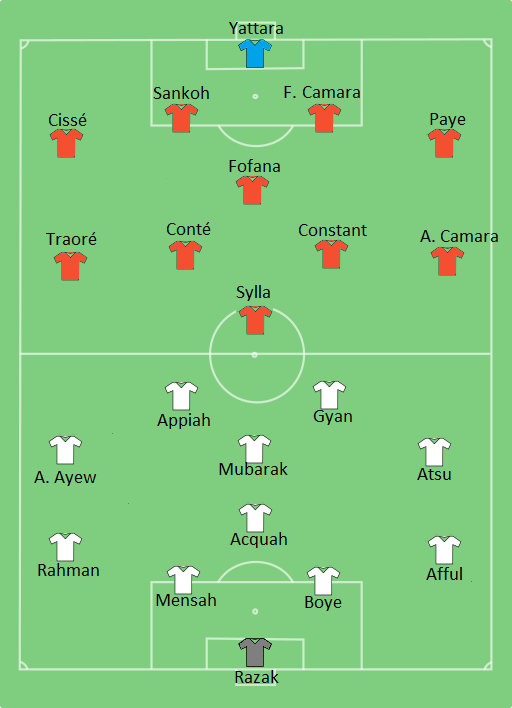

GK	1	Naby Yattara	(yellow card) 33' (red card) 90+4'
RB	13	Abdoulaye Cissé
CB	20	Baissama Sankoh
CB	5	Fodé Camara	(yellow card) 49'
LB	23	Djibril Tamsir Paye	(yellow card) 90'
DM	17	Boubacar Fofana	(yellow card) 70'
CM	12	Ibrahima Conté
CM	10	Kévin Constant	(yellow card) 21'	(substituted off) 56'
RW	8	Ibrahima Traoré (c)
LW	7	Abdoul Camara		(substituted off) 81'
CF	11	Idrissa Sylla		(substituted off) 45'
Substitutions:
FW	2	Mohamed Yattara		(substituted on) 45'
MF	15	Naby Keïta		(substituted on) 56'
FW	19	François Kamano		(substituted on) 81'
Manager:
(France) Michel Dussuyer

Man of the Match:
Kwesi Appiah (Ghana)

Assistant referees:
Evarist Menkouande (Cameroon)
Ali Waleed Ahmed (Sudan)
Fourth official:
Hamada Nampiandraza (Madagascar)

=== Ivory Coast vs Algeria ===
Ivory Coast took the lead in the 26th minute, when Wilfried Bony headed in Max Gradel's cross. Algeria equalized in the 51st minute, after Riyad Mahrez passed to Hillal Soudani to score. Bony scored his second goal of the match in the 68th minute with another header, this time from Yaya Touré's free kick. Ivory Coast sealed the win in the fourth minute of injury time, as Tallo Gadji set up Gervinho in a fast break, and they qualified for the semi-finals for the fourth time in six tournaments.

1 February 2015
20:30

Ivory Coast	3–1	Algeria
Bony 26', 68'; Gervinho 90+4'	Report	Soudani 51'

Estadio de Malabo, Malabo
Attendance: 15,000
Referee: Bakary Gassama (Gambia)

Ivory Coast	Algeria

GK	16	Sylvain Gbohouo
CB	17	Serge Aurier
CB	22	Wilfried Kanon
CB	4	Kolo Touré
RWB	21	Eric Bailly
LWB	5	Siaka Tiéné	(substituted off) 67'
CM	20	Serey Dié
CM	19	Yaya Touré (c)
CM	15	Max Gradel
CF	12	Wilfried Bony	(substituted off) 90+1'
CF	10	Gervinho
Substitutions:
MF	6	Cheick Doukouré	(substituted on) 67'
FW	11	Tallo Gadji	(substituted on) 90+1'
Manager:
(France) Hervé Renard

GK	23	Raïs M'Bolhi
RB	3	Faouzi Ghoulam
CB	2	Madjid Bougherra (c)
CB	20	Aïssa Mandi
LB	12	Carl Medjani
DM	14	Nabil Bentaleb	(yellow card) 78'
RM	19	Saphir Taïder	(yellow card) 90'
LM	11	Yacine Brahimi
AM	10	Sofiane Feghouli
CF	7	Riyad Mahrez		(substituted off) 72'
CF	15	Hillal Soudani		(substituted off) 72'
Substitutions:
FW	9	Ishak Belfodil		(substituted on) 72'
FW	13	Islam Slimani		(substituted on) 72'
Manager:
(France) Christian Gourcuff

Man of the Match:
Wilfried Bony (Ivory Coast)

Assistant referees:
Jean-Claude Birumushasu (Burundi)
Aboubacar Doumbouya (Guinea)
Fourth official:
Ali Lemghaifry (Mauritania)

== Semi-finals ==
=== DR Congo vs Ivory Coast ===
Ivory Coast took the lead in the 20th minute, when Yaya Touré slammed home a pass from Wilfried Bony. DR Congo equalized four minutes later through Dieumerci Mbokani's penalty, awarded for Eric Bailly's handball. Ivory Coast retook the lead in the 41st minute, as Bony set up Gervinho to score. Wilfried Kanon sealed the win in the 68th minute, as he scored from the rebound after Serge Aurier's header was saved. The win put the Ivorians into their fourth Africa Cup of Nations final.

4 February 2015
20:00

DR Congo	1–3	Ivory Coast
Mbokani 24' (pen.)	Report	Y. Touré 20'; Gervinho 41'; Kanon 68'

Estadio de Bata, Bata
Attendance: 30,000
Referee: Néant Alioum (Cameroon)

DR Congo	Ivory Coast

GK	1	Robert Kidiaba (c)
RB	2	Issama Mpeko
CB	15	Joël Kimwaki
CB	14	Gabriel Zakuani
LB	3	Jean Kasusula	(yellow card) 67'
CM	22	Chancel Mbemba
CM	6	Cédric Makiadi		(substituted off) 79'
RW	19	Jeremy Bokila
AM	18	Cedrick Mabwati		(substituted off) 69'
LW	11	Yannick Bolasie
CF	9	Dieumerci Mbokani		(substituted off) 61'
Substitutions:
FW	13	Junior Kabananga	(yellow card) 71'	(substituted on) 61'
MF	10	Neeskens Kebano		(substituted on) 69'
FW	21	Firmin Ndombe Mubele		(substituted on) 79'
Manager:
Florent Ibengé

GK	16	Sylvain Gbohouo
RB	17	Serge Aurier	(yellow card) 76'
CB	21	Eric Bailly
CB	4	Kolo Touré
LB	22	Wilfried Kanon	(yellow card) 26'
CM	20	Serey Dié	(yellow card) 70'
CM	19	Yaya Touré (c)	(yellow card) 28'
RW	15	Max Gradel		(substituted off) 62'
LW	5	Siaka Tiéné		(substituted off) 72'
CF	12	Wilfried Bony		(substituted off) 90+2'
CF	10	Gervinho
Substitutions:
FW	8	Salomon Kalou		(substituted on) 62'
DF	2	Ousmane Viera		(substituted on) 72'
FW	18	Lacina Traoré		(substituted on) 90+2'
Manager:
(France) Hervé Renard

Man of the Match:
Gervinho (Ivory Coast)

Assistant referees:
Evarist Menkouande (Cameroon)
Zakhele Siwela (South Africa)
Fourth official:
Bernard Camille (Seychelles)

=== Ghana vs Equatorial Guinea ===
Ghana took the lead in the 42nd minute through Jordan Ayew's penalty, awarded after Kwesi Appiah was fouled by Felipe Ovono. In the first minute of first half injury time, Mubarak Wakaso finished Christian Atsu's pass in a counter-attack to double Ghana's lead. Ghana's third goal was scored by André Ayew from a cross by Appiah in the 75th minute. The win put the Ghanaians into a record ninth Africa Cup of Nations final.

Crowd disturbances began after Ghana's first goal, culminating after the third in a 40-minute stoppage while security forces corralled the Ghanaian section from the rest of the crowd. The hosts were fined US$100,000 by the CAF.

5 February 2015
20:00

Ghana	3–0	Equatorial Guinea
J. Ayew 42' (pen.); Wakaso 45+1'; A. Ayew 75'	Report

Estadio de Malabo, Malabo
Attendance: 15,250
Referee: Eric Otogo-Castane (Gabon)

Ghana	Equatorial Guinea

GK	1	Brimah Razak
RB	23	Harrison Afful	(yellow card) 44'
CB	21	John Boye
CB	19	Jonathan Mensah
LB	17	Baba Rahman
CM	6	Afriyie Acquah	(yellow card) 68'
CM	11	Mubarak Wakaso	(yellow card) 18'	(substituted off) 76'
RW	7	Christian Atsu
AM	9	Jordan Ayew
LW	10	André Ayew (c)	(yellow card) 66'	(substituted off) 82'
CF	2	Kwesi Appiah
Substitutions:
MF	8	Emmanuel Agyemang-Badu		(substituted on) 76'
MF	22	Frank Acheampong		(substituted on) 82'
Manager:
(Israel) Avram Grant

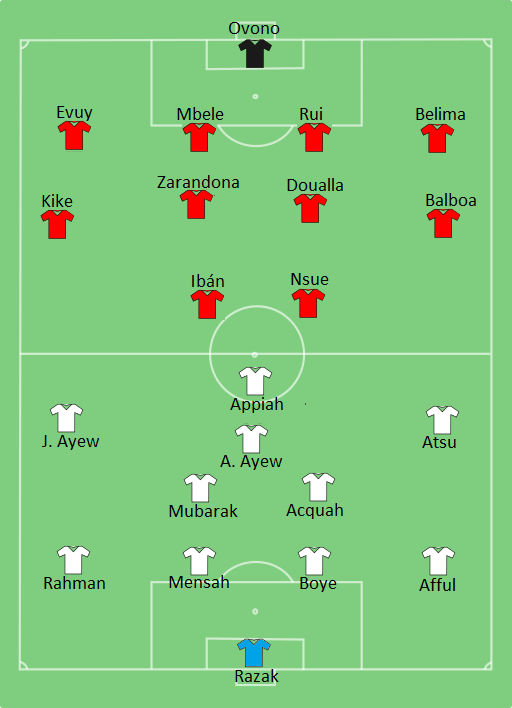

GK	1	Felipe Ovono	(yellow card) 41'
RB	2	Dani Evuy	(yellow card) 37'	(substituted off) 58'
CB	5	Diosdado Mbele
CB	4	Rui
LB	7	Rubén Belima
CM	21	Iván Zarandona		(substituted off) 82'
CM	18	Viera Ellong
RW	14	Kike
LW	11	Javier Balboa
CF	15	Ibán	(yellow card) 68'	(substituted off) 74'
CF	10	Emilio Nsue (c)
Substitutions:
FW	9	Raúl Fabiani		(substituted on) 58'
DF	16	Sipo		(substituted on) 74'
DF	22	Pablo Ganet		(substituted on) 82'
Manager:
(Argentina) Esteban Becker

Man of the Match:
Christian Atsu (Ghana)

Assistant referees:
Albdelhak Etchiali (Algeria)
Jerson Emiliano Dos Santos (Angola)
Fourth official:
Mehdi Abid Charef (Algeria)

== Third place play-off ==
After a goalless 90 minutes, the match was decided by a penalty shoot-out (no extra time was played as per regulations). Equatorial Guinea missed their first and second penalties by Javier Balboa and Raúl Fabiani, while DR Congo converted all four of their kicks, giving them their best finish in the Africa Cup of Nations since 1998 when they also finished third, while the fourth-placed finish for the hosts were still their best ever in the Africa Cup of Nations.

7 February 2015
17:00

DR Congo	0–0	Equatorial Guinea
	Report
Penalties
Mabwati (penalty scored); Mabidi (penalty scored); Mbemba (penalty scored); Mongongu (penalty scored)	4–2	(penalty missed) Balboa; (penalty missed) Fabiani; (penalty scored) Juvenal; (penalty scored) Ellong

Estadio de Malabo, Malabo
Referee: Gehad Grisha (Egypt)

DR Congo	Equatorial Guinea

GK	1	Robert Kidiaba (c)
RB	2	Issama Mpeko
CB	17	Cédric Mongongu
CB	14	Gabriel Zakuani
LB	3	Jean Kasusula
RM	18	Cedrick Mabwati	(yellow card) 87'
CM	22	Chancel Mbemba
CM	6	Cédric Makiadi	(yellow card) 51'	(substituted off) 72'
LM	11	Yannick Bolasie
AM	8	Hervé Kage		(substituted off) 46'
CF	19	Jeremy Bokila		(substituted off) 74'
Substitutions:
FW	9	Dieumerci Mbokani		(substituted on) 46'
MF	20	Lema Mabidi		(substituted on) 72'
FW	13	Junior Kabananga		(substituted on) 74'
Manager:
Florent Ibengé

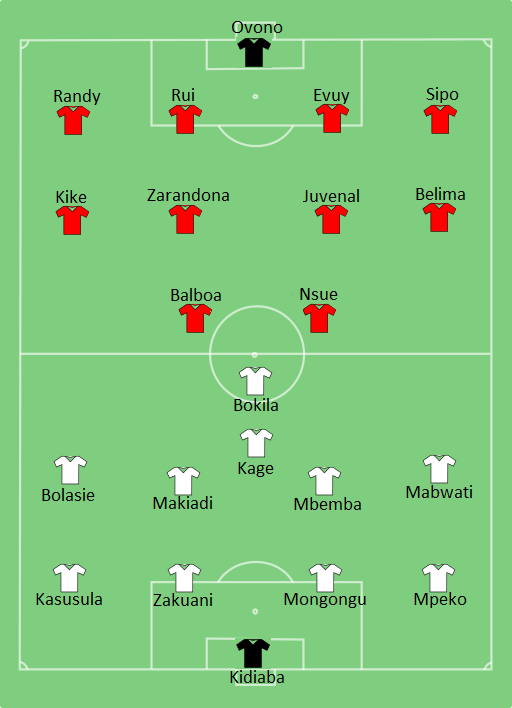

GK	1	Felipe Ovono
RB	8	Randy
CB	2	Dani Evuy
CB	4	Rui
LB	16	Sipo
RM	14	Kike	(substituted off) 46'
CM	21	Iván Zarandona	(substituted off) 46'
CM	6	Juvenal (c)
LM	7	Rubén Belima	(substituted off) 85'
CF	10	Emilio Nsue
CF	11	Javier Balboa
Substitutions:
DF	20	Miguel Ángel	(substituted on) 46'
MF	18	Viera Ellong	(substituted on) 46'
FW	9	Raúl Fabiani	(substituted on) 85'
Manager:
(Argentina) Esteban Becker

Man of the Match:
Robert Kidiaba (DR Congo)

Assistant referees:
Peter Edibe (Nigeria)
Jean-Claude Birumushahu (Burundi)
Fourth official:
Malang Diedhiou (Senegal)

== Final ==
After a goalless 120 minutes (regulation and extra time), the match was decided by a penalty shoot-out. Ivory Coast missed their first and second penalties by Wilfried Bony and Tallo Gadji, while Ghana missed their third and fourth penalties by Afriyie Acquah and Frank Acheampong. Both teams converted their kicks in the fifth to tenth rounds, and in the eleventh round, Ivorian goalkeeper Boubacar Barry saved from his counterpart Brimah Razak, diving to his left to push the ball around the post. He then scored his own penalty shooting to the right of the net. Ivory Coast won their second title and their first since 1992, where they also defeated Ghana in the final after a penalty shoot-out, while Ghana lost their third straight Africa Cup of Nations final after their last triumph in 1982.

=== Details ===
8 February 2015
20:00

Ivory Coast	0–0 (a.e.t.)	Ghana
	Report
Penalties
Bony (penalty missed); Gadji (penalty missed); Aurier (penalty scored); Doumbia (penalty scored); Y. Touré (penalty scored); Kalou (penalty scored); K. Touré (penalty scored); Kanon (penalty scored); Bailly (penalty scored); Dié (penalty scored); Barry (penalty scored)	9–8	(penalty scored) Wakaso; (penalty scored) J. Ayew; (penalty missed) Acquah; (penalty missed) Acheampong; (penalty scored) A. Ayew; (penalty scored) Mensah; (penalty scored) Badu; (penalty scored) Afful; (penalty scored) Rahman; (penalty scored) Boye; (penalty missed) Razak

Estadio de Bata, Bata
Attendance: 32,857
Referee: Bakary Gassama (Gambia)

Ivory Coast	Ghana

GK	1	Boubacar Barry
CB	21	Eric Bailly	(yellow card) 105+1'
CB	4	Kolo Touré
CB	22	Wilfried Kanon	(yellow card) 87'
RM	17	Serge Aurier
CM	20	Serey Dié	(yellow card) 14'
CM	19	Yaya Touré (c)
LM	5	Siaka Tiéné	(yellow card) 57'	(substituted off) 116'
RF	15	Max Gradel		(substituted off) 67'
CF	12	Wilfried Bony
LF	10	Gervinho		(substituted off) 120+2'
Substitutions:
FW	7	Seydou Doumbia		(substituted on) 67'
FW	8	Salomon Kalou		(substituted on) 116'
FW	11	Tallo Gadji		(substituted on) 120+2'
Manager:
(France) Hervé Renard

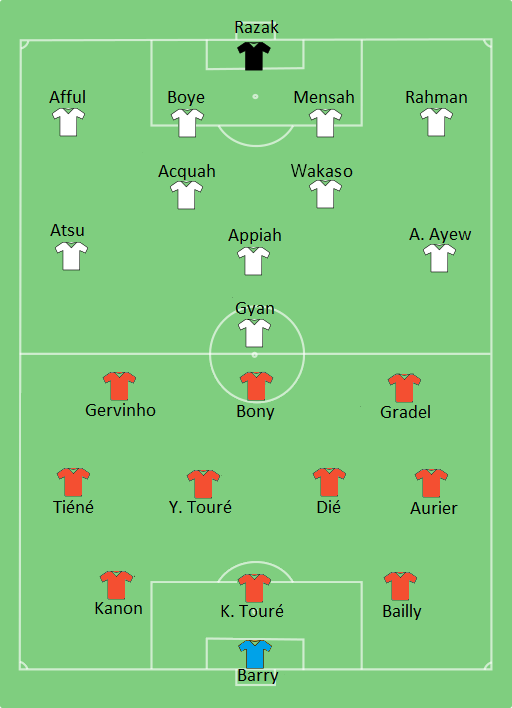

GK	1	Brimah Razak
RB	23	Harrison Afful
CB	21	John Boye
CB	19	Jonathan Mensah
LB	17	Baba Rahman
CM	11	Mubarak Wakaso
CM	6	Afriyie Acquah
RW	7	Christian Atsu	(substituted off) 116'
AM	2	Kwesi Appiah	(substituted off) 99'
LW	10	André Ayew
CF	3	Asamoah Gyan (c)	(substituted off) 120+1'
Substitutions:
FW	9	Jordan Ayew	(substituted on) 99'
FW	22	Frank Acheampong	(substituted on) 116'
MF	8	Emmanuel Agyemang-Badu	(substituted on) 120+1'
Manager:
(Israel) Avram Grant

Man of the Match:
Afriyie Acquah (Ghana)

Assistant referees:
Djibril Camara (Senegal)
Ali Waleed Ahmed (Sudan)
Fourth official:
Jacob Bolam (Zambia)
