= 2015 Africa Cup of Nations Group A =

Football tournament group stage

Group A of the 2015 Africa Cup of Nations was played from 17 January until 25 January in Equatorial Guinea. The group consisted of the hosts Equatorial Guinea, Burkina Faso, Gabon, and Congo. Congo and Equatorial Guinea advanced as group winners and runners-up respectively, while Gabon and Burkina Faso were eliminated.

== Teams ==
Draw position	Team	Method of qualification	Date of qualification	Finals appearance	Last appearance	Previous best performance	CAF Rankings Points (Note: The CAF rankings were used for seeding for the final draw.)	FIFA Rankings Start of event
A1	Equatorial Guinea	Hosts	14 November 2014	2nd	2012	Quarter-finals (2012)	9	118
A2	Burkina Faso	Group C runners-up	15 November 2014	10th	2013	Runners-up (2013)	40	64
A3	Gabon	Group C winners	15 November 2014	6th	2012	Quarter-finals (1996, 2012)	22	62
A4	Congo	Group A runners-up	19 November 2014	7th	2000	Winners (1972)	13	61

== Standings ==
Pos	Team	Pld	W	D	L	GF	GA	GD	Pts	Qualification
1	Congo	3	2	1	0	4	2	+2	7	Advance to knockout stage
2	Equatorial Guinea (H)	3	1	2	0	3	1	+2	5	Advance to knockout stage
3	Gabon	3	1	0	2	2	3	−1	3	
4	Burkina Faso	3	0	1	2	1	4	−3	1	

Source: CAF
(H) Hosts

In the quarter-finals:

- Congo advanced to play DR Congo (runner-up of Group B).
- Equatorial Guinea advanced to play Tunisia (winner of Group B).

== Matches ==
All times local, WAT (UTC+1).

=== Equatorial Guinea vs Congo ===
The first goal of the tournament was scored by Emilio Nsue. Receiving a through ball from Kike, he slotted the ball low past the goalkeeper with his right foot from six yards out to open the scoring for the hosts after 16 minutes. Thievy Bifouma scored the equalizer for Congo with three minutes left, after being played in by Dominique Malonga, he slotted it low into the net from the right of the six yard box.

17 January 2015
17:00

Equatorial Guinea	1–1	Congo
Nsue 16'	Report	Bifouma 87'

Estadio de Bata, Bata
Attendance: 40,245
Referee: Bakary Gassama (Gambia)

Equatorial Guinea	Congo

GK	1	Felipe Ovono	(yellow card) 81'
RB	22	Pablo Ganet		(substituted off) 46'
CB	5	Diosdado Mbele	(yellow card) 26'
CB	4	Rui
LB	16	Sipo
RM	11	Javier Balboa	(yellow card) 89'
CM	21	Iván Zarandona
CM	8	Randy
LM	14	Kike		(substituted off) 59'
CF	15	Ibán		(substituted off) 90+2'
CF	10	Emilio Nsue (c)
Substitutions:
MF	18	Viera Ellong		(substituted in) 46'
MF	7	Rubén Belima		(substituted in) 59'
FW	12	Iván Bolado		(substituted in) 90+2'
Manager:
(Argentina) Esteban Becker

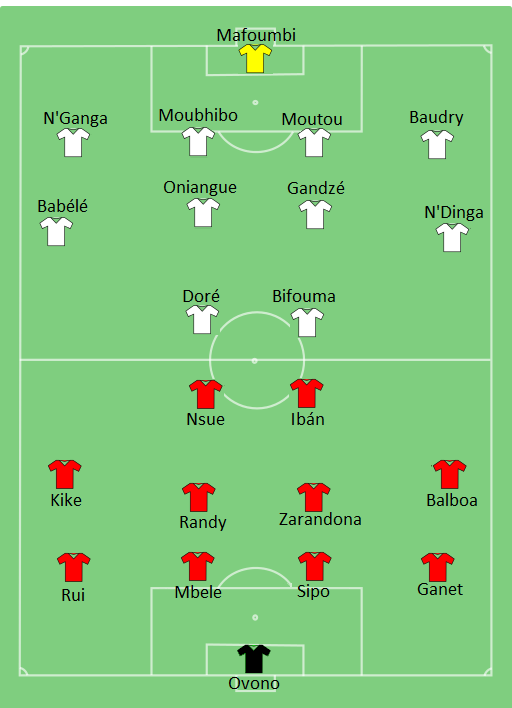

GK	1	Christoffer Mafoumbi
RB	2	Francis N'Ganga
CB	4	Boris Moubhibo	(yellow card) 24'
CB	5	Arnold Bouka Moutou		(substituted off) 78'
LB	18	Marvin Baudry
RM	21	Sagesse Babélé
CM	7	Prince Oniangué (c)
CM	14	Césaire Gandzé		(substituted off) 60'
LM	8	Delvin N'Dinga
CF	10	Férébory Doré		(substituted off) 65'
CF	13	Thievy Bifouma
Substitutions:
FW	11	Fabrice Ondama		(substituted in) 60'
FW	15	Ladislas Douniama		(substituted in) 65'
FW	19	Dominique Malonga		(substituted in) 78'
Manager:
(France) Claude Le Roy

Man of the Match:
Emilio Nsue (Equatorial Guinea)

Assistant referees:
Evarist Menkouande (Cameroon)
Marwa Range (Kenya)
Fourth official:
Hamada Nampiandraza (Madagascar)

=== Burkina Faso vs Gabon ===
Pierre-Emerick Aubameyang opened the scoring in the 19th minute, as after his initial shot was saved, he collected the rebound and calmly slotted home from seven yards out with his right foot. Gabon sealed the win in the 72nd minute with Malick Evouna's header from Frédéric Bulot's cross.

17 January 2015
20:00

Burkina Faso	0–2	Gabon
	Report	Aubameyang 19'; Evouna 72'

Estadio de Bata, Bata
Attendance: 40,245
Referee: Rajindraparsad Seechurn (Mauritius)

Burkina Faso	Gabon

GK	23	Germain Sanou
RB	5	Mohamed Koffi
CB	2	Steeve Yago
CB	4	Bakary Koné
LB	13	Narcisse Bambara
RM	19	Bertrand Traoré
CM	18	Charles Kaboré (c)
CM	6	Djakaridja Koné	(substituted off) 77'
LM	17	Jonathan Zongo	(substituted off) 66'
CF	10	Alain Traoré
CF	11	Jonathan Pitroipa
Substitutions:
FW	15	Aristide Bancé	(substituted in) 66'
MF	22	Préjuce Nakoulma	(substituted in) 77'
Manager:
(Belgium) Paul Put

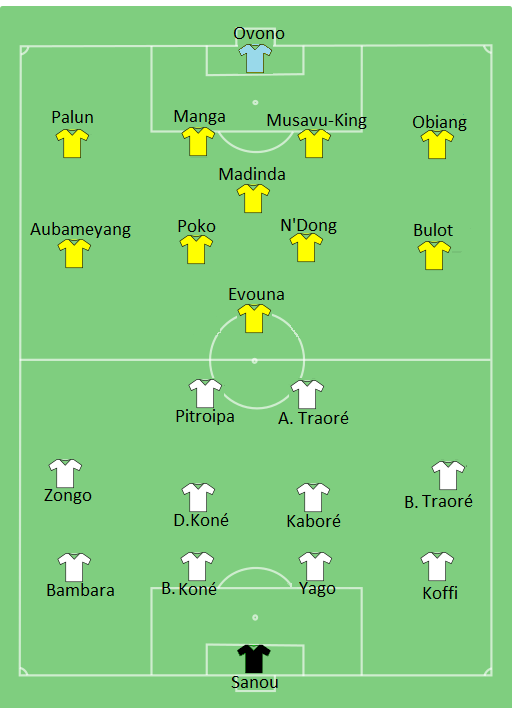

GK	1	Didier Ovono
RB	8	Lloyd Palun
CB	5	Bruno Ecuele Manga
CB	4	Yrondu Musavu-King
LB	6	Johann Obiang	(yellow card) 77'
DM	11	Lévy Madinda		(substituted off) 83'
RM	22	Didier Ibrahim N'Dong	(yellow card) 40'	(substituted off) 63'
LM	17	André Biyogo Poko
AM	10	Frédéric Bulot	(yellow card) 53'
CF	7	Malick Evouna		(substituted off) 87'
CF	9	Pierre-Emerick Aubameyang (c)
Substitutions:
MF	12	Guélor Kanga		(substituted in) 63'
MF	13	Samson Mbingui		(substituted in) 83'
FW	3	Johann Lengoualama		(substituted in) 87'
Manager:
(Portugal) Jorge Costa

Man of the Match:
Pierre-Emerick Aubameyang (Gabon)

Assistant referees:
Angesom Ogbamariam (Eritrea)
Zakhele Thusi Siwela (South Africa)
Fourth official:
Med Said Kordi (Tunisia)

=== Equatorial Guinea vs Burkina Faso ===
In the first goalless draw of the tournament, Burkina Faso hit the post twice, first through a free kick by Alain Traoré, then later when his shot was tipped to the post by Felipe Ovono.

21 January 2015
17:00

Equatorial Guinea	0–0	Burkina Faso
	Report

Estadio de Bata, Bata
Attendance: 39,867
Referee: Sidi Alioum (Cameroon)

Equatorial Guinea	Burkina Faso

GK	1	Felipe Ovono
RB	8	Randy
CB	5	Diosdado Mbele	(yellow card) 28'
CB	4	Rui
LB	16	Sipo
DM	21	Iván Zarandona
RM	14	Kike		(substituted off) 81'
CM	18	Viera Ellong
CM	11	Javier Balboa		(substituted off) 83'
LM	15	Ibán		(substituted off) 71'
CF	10	Emilio Nsue (c)
Substitutions:
MF	6	Juvenal		(substituted in) 71'
FW	12	Iván Bolado		(substituted in) 81'
FW	9	Raúl Fabiani		(substituted in) 83'
Manager:
(Argentina) Esteban Becker

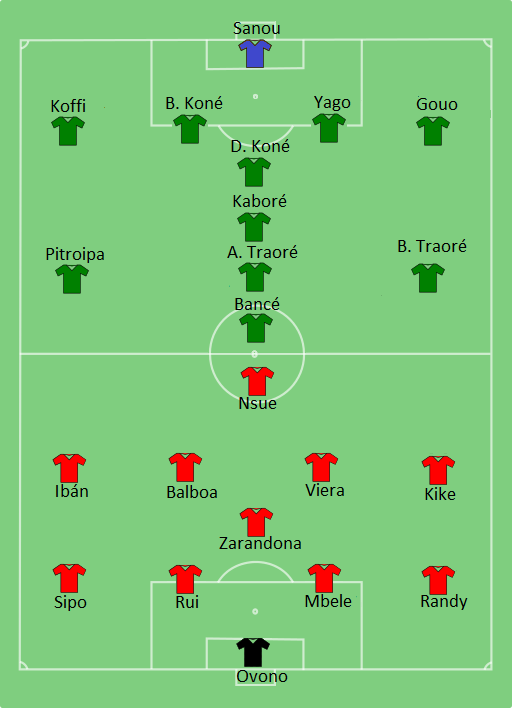

GK	23	Germain Sanou
RB	5	Mohamed Koffi
CB	4	Bakary Koné
CB	2	Steeve Yago
LB	9	Issa Gouo	(yellow card) 23'
DM	6	Djakaridja Koné
CM	18	Charles Kaboré (c)
RW	11	Jonathan Pitroipa		(substituted off) 82'
AM	10	Alain Traoré
LW	19	Bertrand Traoré
CF	15	Aristide Bancé
Substitutions:
MF	22	Préjuce Nakoulma		(substituted in) 82'
Manager:
(Belgium) Paul Put

Man of the Match:
Emilio Nsue (Equatorial Guinea)

Assistant referees:
Evarist Menkouande (Cameroon)
Ali Waleed Ahmed (Sudan)
Fourth official:
Mohamed Said Kordi (Tunisia)

=== Gabon vs Congo ===
Congo secured their first win in the Africa Cup of Nations since 1974, as Prince Oniangué scored the only goal in the 48th minute after the Gabon defence failed to clear a corner.

21 January 2015
20:00

Gabon	0–1	Congo
	Report	Oniangué 48'

Estadio de Bata, Bata
Attendance: 34,782
Referee: Victor Gomes (South Africa)

Gabon	Congo

GK	1	Didier Ovono
RB	8	Lloyd Palun
CB	5	Bruno Ecuele Manga
CB	2	Aaron Appindangoyé
LB	6	Johann Obiang
DM	11	Lévy Madinda		(substituted off) 84'
RM	22	Didier Ibrahim N'Dong		(substituted off) 56'
LM	17	André Biyogo Poko	(yellow card) 74'
AM	10	Frédéric Bulot		(substituted off) 89'
CF	7	Malick Evouna
CF	9	Pierre-Emerick Aubameyang (c)
Substitutions:
MF	12	Guélor Kanga		(substituted in) 56'
MF	13	Samson Mbingui		(substituted in) 84'
FW	3	Johann Lengoualama		(substituted in) 89'
Manager:
(Portugal) Jorge Costa

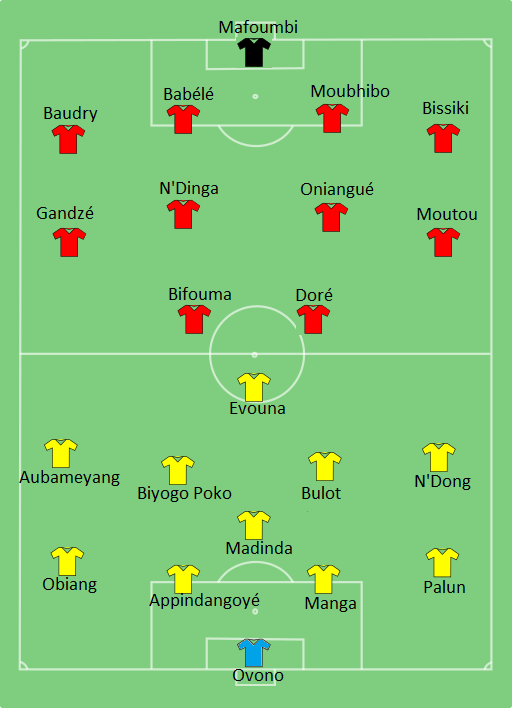

GK	1	Christoffer Mafoumbi
RB	18	Marvin Baudry
CB	21	Sagesse Babélé
CB	4	Boris Moubhibo	(yellow card) 45+1'
LB	6	Dimitri Bissiki
RM	14	Césaire Gandzé		(substituted off) 74'
CM	8	Delvin N'Dinga
CM	7	Prince Oniangué (c)
LM	5	Arnold Bouka Moutou		(substituted off) 87'
CF	13	Thievy Bifouma
CF	10	Férébory Doré		(substituted off) 75'
Substitutions:
FW	11	Fabrice Ondama		(substituted in) 74'
MF	17	Chris Malonga		(substituted in) 75'
DF	2	Francis N'Ganga		(substituted in) 87'
Manager:
(France) Claude Le Roy

Man of the Match:
Prince Oniangué (Congo)

Assistant referees:
Peter Edibe (Nigeria)
Tahssen Abo El Sadat Bedyer (Egypt)
Fourth official:
Gehad Grisha (Egypt)

=== Gabon vs Equatorial Guinea ===
Equatorial Guinea took the lead in the 55th minute through Javier Balboa's penalty, awarded after he was brought down by Lloyd Palun. They sealed the win in the 86th minute, as Ibán converted the rebound after Emilio Nsue's shot was saved, confirming their qualification to the knockout stage and eliminating Gabon.

25 January 2015
19:00

Gabon	0–2	Equatorial Guinea
	Report	Balboa 55' (pen.); Ibán 85'

Estadio de Bata, Bata
Attendance: 39,230
Referee: Noumandiez Doué (Ivory Coast)

Gabon	Equatorial Guinea

GK	1	Didier Ovono
RB	8	Lloyd Palun	(yellow card) 54'
CB	5	Bruno Ecuele Manga
CB	2	Aaron Appindangoyé
LB	6	Johann Obiang	(yellow card) 16'	(substituted off) 83'
DM	11	Lévy Madinda
RM	12	Guélor Kanga		(substituted off) 76'
LM	17	André Biyogo Poko		(substituted off) 69'
AM	10	Frédéric Bulot
CF	7	Malick Evouna
CF	9	Pierre-Emerick Aubameyang (c)
Substitutions:
MF	22	Didier Ibrahim N'Dong		(substituted in) 69'
FW	21	Romaric Rogombé		(substituted in) 76'
FW	3	Johann Lengoualama		(substituted in) 83'
Manager:
(Portugal) Jorge Costa

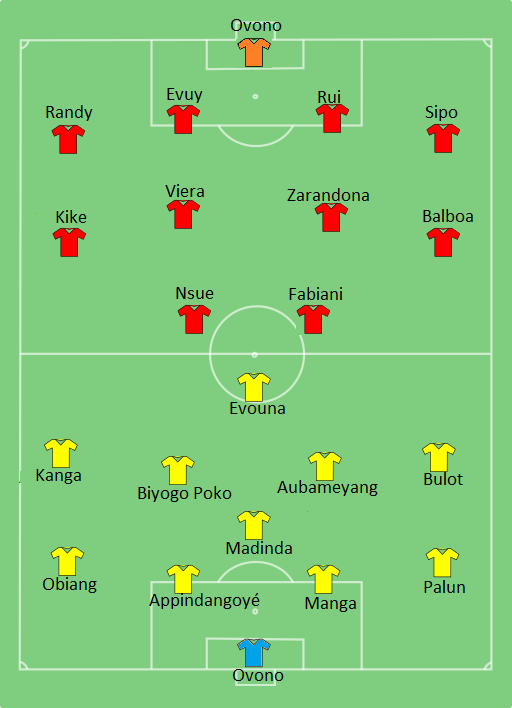

GK	1	Felipe Ovono
RB	8	Randy	(yellow card) 19'
CB	2	Dani Evuy
CB	4	Rui
LB	16	Sipo
RM	14	Kike		(substituted off) 68'
CM	18	Viera Ellong
CM	21	Iván Zarandona	(yellow card) 50'
LM	11	Javier Balboa
CF	10	Emilio Nsue (c)		(substituted off) 89'
CF	9	Raúl Fabiani		(substituted off) 76'
Substitutions:
MF	15	Ibán	(yellow card) 86'	(substituted in) 68'
MF	6	Juvenal		(substituted in) 76'
FW	17	Rubén Darío		(substituted in) 89'
Manager:
(Argentina) Esteban Becker

Man of the Match:
Javier Balboa (Equatorial Guinea)

Assistant referees:
Djibril Camara (Senegal)
Aboubacar Doumbouya (Guinea)
Fourth official:
Bernard Camille (Seychelles)

=== Congo vs Burkina Faso ===
Congo took the lead in the 51st minute, when Férébory Doré crossed for Thievy Bifouma to convert from close range. Burkina Faso equalized in the 86th minute, after Aristide Bancé scored from Issiaka Ouédraogo's cross, but Congo retook the lead one minute later, as from a Congo free kick, Burkina Faso goalkeeper Germain Sanou punched the ball and it hit Fabrice Ondama and went into the net. As a result, Congo qualified as group winners while Burkina Faso were eliminated.

25 January 2015
19:00

Congo	2–1	Burkina Faso
Bifouma 51'; Ondama 87'	Report	Bancé 86'

Estadio de Ebibeyin, Ebibeyin
Attendance: 7,945
Referee: Joseph Lamptey (Ghana)

Congo	Burkina Faso

GK	1	Christoffer Mafoumbi
RB	18	Marvin Baudry
CB	21	Sagesse Babélé
CB	2	Francis N'Ganga
LB	6	Dimitri Bissiki
DM	8	Delvin N'Dinga
RM	5	Arnold Bouka Moutou
CM	7	Prince Oniangué (c)
LM	12	Francis Litsingi	(substituted off) 89'
CF	13	Thievy Bifouma	(substituted off) 63'
CF	10	Férébory Doré	(substituted off) 75'
Substitutions:
FW	15	Ladislas Douniama	(substituted in) 63'
FW	11	Fabrice Ondama	(substituted in) 75'
MF	14	Césaire Gandzé	(substituted in) 89'
Manager:
(France) Claude Le Roy

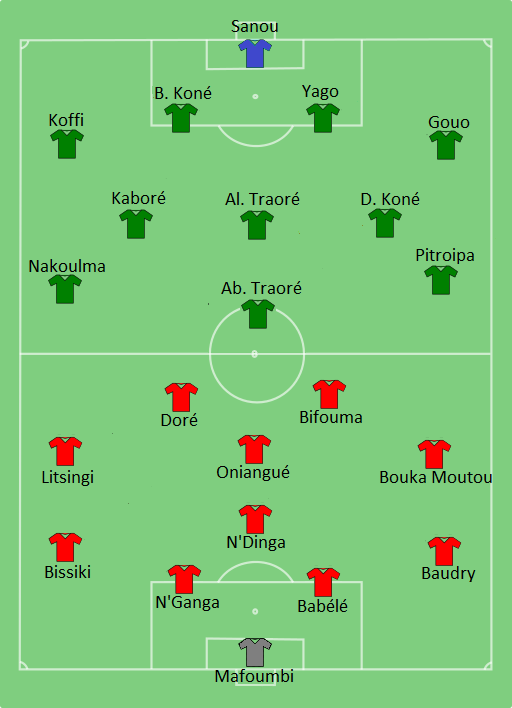

GK	23	Germain Sanou
RB	5	Mohamed Koffi
CB	4	Bakary Koné
CB	2	Steeve Yago
LB	9	Issa Gouo	(substituted off) 59'
CM	18	Charles Kaboré (c)
CM	10	Alain Traoré
CM	6	Djakaridja Koné
RW	22	Préjuce Nakoulma	(substituted off) 58'
LW	11	Jonathan Pitroipa
CF	21	Abdou Traoré	(substituted off) 73'
Substitutions:
MF	19	Bertrand Traoré	(substituted in) 58'
FW	15	Aristide Bancé	(substituted in) 59'
FW	20	Issiaka Ouédraogo	(substituted in) 73'
Manager:
(Belgium) Paul Put

Man of the Match:
Fabrice Ondama (Congo)

Assistant referees:
El Hadji Malick Samba (Senegal)
Oamogetse Godisamang (Botswana)
Fourth official:
Victor Gomes (South Africa)
