= Aitor Embela =

Equatoguinean footballer (born 1996)

Personal information
- Full name: Aitor Mbela Gil
- Birth name: Aitor Embela Gil
- Date of birth: 17 April 1996 (age 30)
- Place of birth: Figueres, Spain
- Height: 1.82 m (6 ft 0 in)
- Position: Goalkeeper

Team information
- Current team: Olympic Charleroi
- Number: 31

Youth career
- 2002–2004: Altura
- 2004–2012: Villarreal
- 2012–2015: Málaga

Senior career*
Years	Team	Apps	(Gls)
2015–2016	Reus	0	(0)
2016–2017	Valladolid B	0	(0)
2017	Sabadell B	8	(0)
2017–2018	Jumilla	1	(0)
2018–2019	Logroñés Promesas	31	(0)
2019–2020	Figueres	12	(0)
2020–2021	Atlético Saguntino	5	(0)
2021	Lorca	17	(0)
2021–2023	Somozas	31	(0)
2023–2026	Soneja	3	(0)
2026–	Olympic Charleroi	9	(0)

International career^{‡}
2011	Equatorial Guinea U16		
2015–	Equatorial Guinea	9	(0)
- * Club domestic league appearances and goals as of 20 April 2026 ‡ National team caps and goals as of 27 September 2022

Aitor Mbela Gil (born 17 April 1996), known in Spain as Aitor Embela Gil, is a professional footballer who plays as a goalkeeper for Challenger Pro League club Olympic Charleroi. Born in Spain, he plays for the Equatorial Guinea national team.

== Club career ==
Born in Figueres, Girona, Catalonia and raised in Altura and Segorbe, Province of Castellón, Valencian Community, Embela joined Villarreal CF's youth setup in 2004, aged eight, after starting it out at locals CD Altura. In the 2012 summer he joined Málaga CF, being assigned to the Juvenil squad.

On 14 July 2015 Embela signed a two-year deal with CF Reus Deportiu, in Segunda División B. He terminated his contract with Reus on 29 August of the following year, and two days later he signed a one-year deal with Real Valladolid B.

On 21 January 2026, Embela signed for Olympic Charleroi.

== International career ==
On 3 January 2015 Embela was included in Esteban Becker's Equatorial Guinea 23-men list for the 2015 Africa Cup of Nations. Four days later he made his international debut, starting in a 1–1 non-FIFA friendly draw against Cape Verde.

Embela served as a backup to Felipe Ovono during the tournament, as his side finished fourth. He made his full international debut on 26 March, starting in a 0–2 friendly loss against Egypt.

== Personal life ==
Embela's father, José Manuel, was also a footballer. A forward, he appeared mainly in Segunda División B before becoming a coach. His paternal grandfather, Gustavo Chomé Mbela Bueneque, was born in Dibolo, Wele-Nzas, making him eligible to both Equatorial Guinea and Spain.

== Career statistics ==
=== International ===
As of 27 September 2022

Equatorial Guinea
Year	Apps	Goals
2015	3	0
2019	2	0
2021	1	0
2022	3	0
Total	9	0
