= Torrellano Illice CF =

- logo
- Full name: Torrellano Illice Elche Parque Empresarial Club de Fútbol
- Founded: 2009
- Dissolved: 2011
- Ground: Isabel Fernández; Elche, Valencian Community, Spain
- Capacity: 2,000
- 2010–11: 3ª – Group 6, 9th
Home colours	Away colours

Torrellano Illice Elche Parque Empresarial Club de Fútbol, known as Torrellano Illice, was a Spanish football team based in Torrellano, Elche, in the Valencian Community. Founded in 2009 and dissolved in 2011, it held home games at Polideportivo Isabel Fernández, with a capacity of 2,000 spectators.

== History ==
Torrellano Illice was founded in 2009, after a merger between Torrellano CF and CD Illice.

In June 2011, after two seasons in Tercera División, the club's seat was sold to Huracán CF, and moved to Valencia.

== Season to season ==
Season	Tier	Division	Place	Copa del Rey
2009–10	4	3ª	10th	
2010–11	4	3ª	9th	

- 2 seasons in Tercera División

== Famous players ==
- (Cameroon) François Obele (74 appearances/56 goals)
- (Equatorial Guinea) Sipo
