= Miguel Ángel Mayé =

Equatoguinean footballer (born 1995)

Miguel Ángel
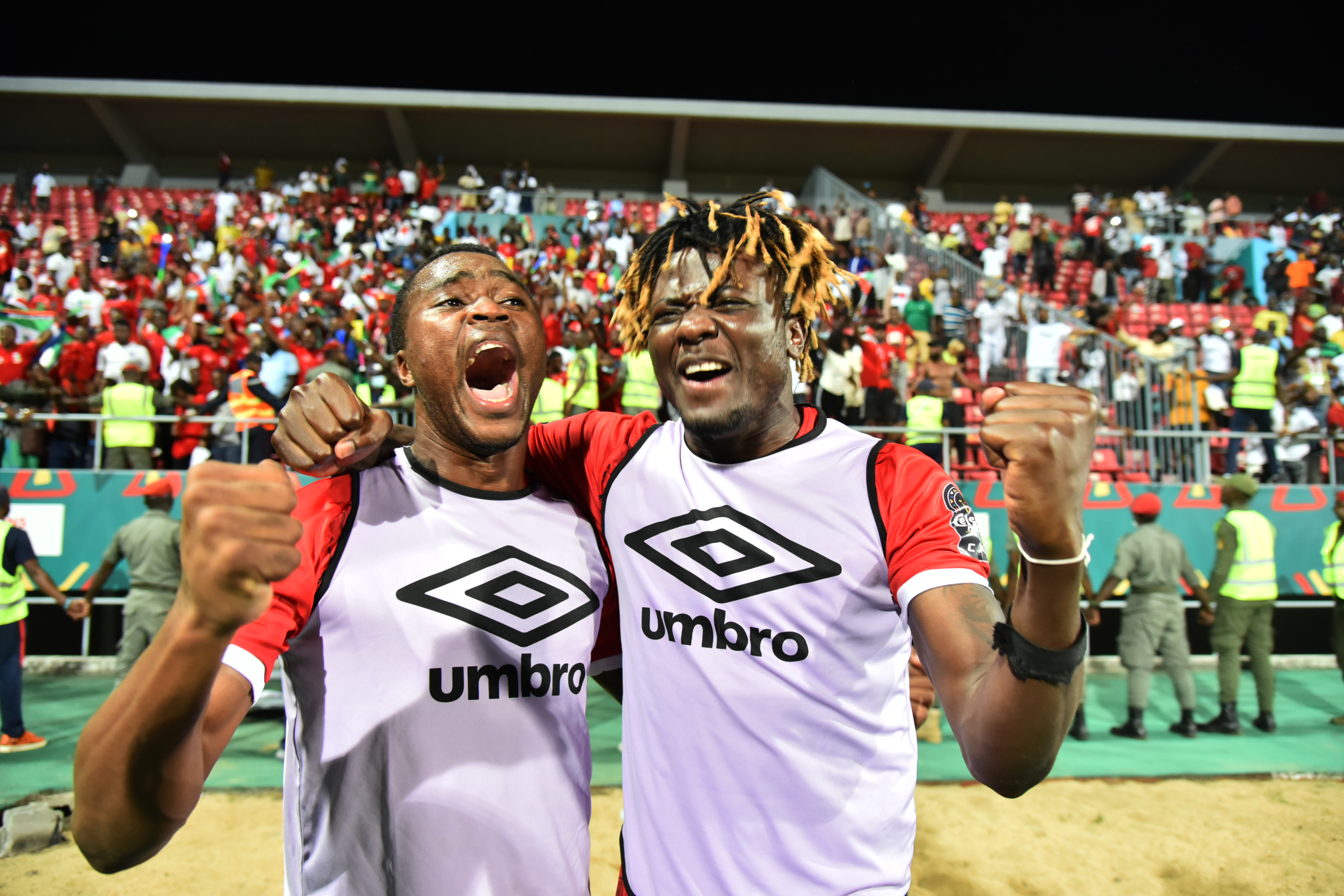
- Mayé with Equatorial Guinea in 2022

Personal information
- Full name: Miguel Ángel Mayé Ngomo
- Date of birth: 8 December 1995 (age 30)
- Place of birth: Ebibeyin, Equatorial Guinea
- Height: 1.74 m (5 ft 9 in)
- Positions: Right-back; right midfielder

Team information
- Current team: 15 de Agosto

Senior career*
Years	Team	Apps	(Gls)
2012	Deportivo Mongomo		
2013–2014	Akonangui		
2015	Leones Vegetarianos		
2016	Extremadura	1	(0)
2017–2018	Leones Vegetarianos		
2019–2023	Futuro Kings		
2023–2024	Fundación Bata		
2024–	15 de Agosto		

International career^{‡}
2015–	Equatorial Guinea	1	(0)
- * Club domestic league appearances and goals as of 17 April 2016 ‡ National team caps and goals as of 7 February 2015

Miguel Ángel Mayé Ngomo (born 8 December 1995) is an Equatoguinean footballer who plays as a right-back for LIFGE club 15 de Agosto and the Equatorial Guinea national team.

== Club career ==
Born in Ebibeyin, Kié-Ntem, Miguel Ángel played with his hometown club Akonangui the preliminary round of 2014 CAF Champions League, against Cameroonian side Les Astres.

== International career ==
On 8 January 2015, Miguel Ángel was included in Esteban Becker's 23-men list for the 2015 Africa Cup of Nations.

== Statistics ==
=== International ===
As of 27 September 2022

Equatorial Guinea
Year	Apps	Goals
2015	2	0
2018	2	0
2019	1	0
2020	1	0
2021	4	0
2022	5	0
Total	15	0
