= Emilio Nsue =

Equatoguinean footballer (born 1989)

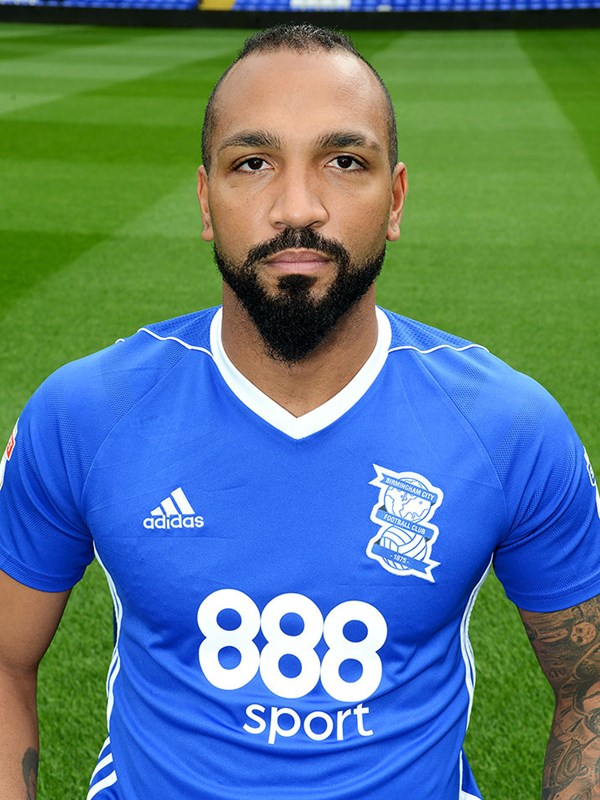
- Nsue with Birmingham City in 2017

Personal information
- Full name: Emilio Nsue López
- Date of birth: 30 September 1989 (age 37)
- Place of birth: Palma de Mallorca, Spain
- Height: 1.82 m (6 ft 0 in)
- Positions: Right-back; winger

Youth career
- Atlético Baleares
- 2004–2006: Mallorca

Senior career*
Years	Team	Apps	(Gls)
2006–2008	Mallorca B	55	(26)
2008–2014	Mallorca	142	(13)
2008–2009	→ Castellón (loan)	38	(7)
2009–2010	→ Real Sociedad (loan)	33	(5)
2014–2017	Middlesbrough	70	(3)
2017–2018	Birmingham City	36	(1)
2018–2019	APOEL	26	(10)
2019–2020	Apollon Limassol	14	(1)
2020–2021	APOEL	27	(3)
2022	Tuzla City	7	(1)
2022–2026	Intercity	114	(23)
Total		562	(93)

International career
2005	Spain U16	3	(3)
2005–2006	Spain U17	9	(5)
2006–2008	Spain U19	21	(7)
2009	Spain U20	10	(4)
2009–2011	Spain U21	8	(1)
2013–2025	Equatorial Guinea	51	(25)
- * Club domestic league appearances and goals

Emilio Nsue López (born 30 September 1989) is a former professional footballer. Born in Spain, he served as captain and became the all-time leading scorer of the Equatorial Guinea national team. A versatile player, he plays mainly as a right-back but can also play as a winger.

Nsue began his career at Mallorca, where he appeared in 153 competitive games and four La Liga seasons, and spent time on loan at Real Sociedad and Castellón. In 2014, he joined English club Middlesbrough, and helped them gain promotion to the Premier League in 2016. Nsue signed for Birmingham City in January 2017, and a year later moved into Cypriot football, spending 18 months with APOEL, a season with Apollon Limassol, and another season with APOEL. After six months without a club, he joined Bosnian Premier League club Tuzla City in 2022, before joining Spanish club Intercity later in the same year.

Nsue was born in Spain to an Equatoguinean father and a Spanish mother and initially played for Spain at youth level, winning European championships at under-19 level in 2007 and under-21 level in 2011. In 2013, he made his senior international debut for Equatorial Guinea, his father's country, despite not having Equatoguinean nationality nor permission to switch allegiances. He played in four Africa Cup of Nations tournaments in 2015, 2021, 2023, and 2025, finishing as the top scorer in 2023 and receiving the Golden Boot as a result. In 2024, FIFA judges ruled that Nsue was ineligible to play for the Equatorial Guinea national team for his entire career and handed him a playing ban. However, his official change of international allegiance to Equatorial Guinea was approved by FIFA the following year.

== Club career ==
=== Mallorca ===
Nsue was born in Palma, Majorca, in the Balearic Islands, and began his football career as a forward in the youth system of Mallorca. He made his professional debut for the club on 3 February 2008, playing the last few minutes of a 1–1 draw at Villarreal. He added a few more minutes the following week, in a goalless home draw with Almería.

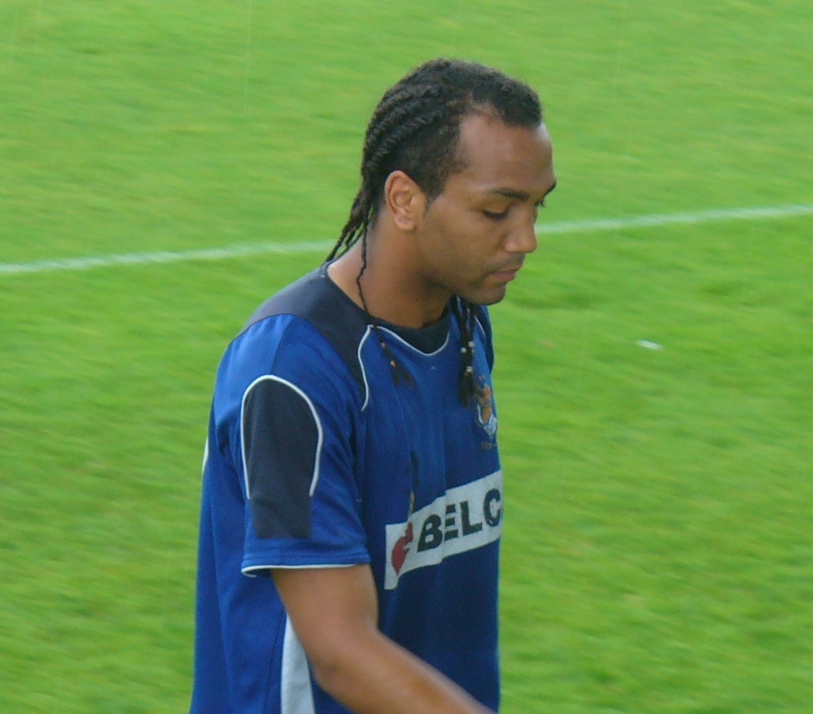
Nsue in training with Real Sociedad in 2010

For 2008–09, Nsue was loaned to Castellón of the Segunda División. Regularly used in a comfortable campaign for the Valencians, he scored twice in a 4–1 win at home to Levante on 18 October 2008.

Nsue joined another second-tier club, Real Sociedad, on loan for the 2009–10 season. Although rarely a starter, he was an important member of the attack as the Basque team returned to La Liga after a three-year absence.

Nsue returned to Mallorca for 2010–11 and began the season in the starting eleven, the first match being a 0–0 home draw with Real Madrid. On 3 October 2010 he scored his first competitive goal for the club, heading in from a corner in a 1–1 draw at Barcelona. He appeared in all 38 league games and netted four times as his team narrowly avoided relegation.

In 2011–12 Nsue played in several matches as an attacking right back, and totalled nearly 2,000 minutes of action (20 starts) to help Mallorca rank eighth. After conversations with manager Joaquín Caparrós during pre-season, it was agreed that he would start the following campaign in that position.

=== Middlesbrough ===
On 1 August 2014, Nsue joined English Football League Championship club Middlesbrough, signing a three-year contract as a free agent. He was signed by Aitor Karanka, who knew him from the Spanish youth set-up. Eight days later he made his debut, coming on as a substitute for Albert Adomah for the last 23 minutes of a 2–0 win over Birmingham City at the Riverside Stadium. On 12 August he made his first start, playing the whole of a 3–0 win at Oldham Athletic in the first round of the 2014–15 League Cup.

Boro reached the play-off final at Wembley on 25 May 2015. They lost 2–0 to Norwich City, and Nsue played the second half in place of Dean Whitehead after both goals had already been conceded. Despite Karanka's insistence that the player would only be used in defence as an emergency procedure, he played much of his second season at right back. On 28 November 2015, he scored his first goal in English football to complete a 2–0 win at Huddersfield Town. On 15 December, he netted the only goal of a home win over Burnley that put Middlesbrough top of the table.

Nsue played 37 of 46 league games in 2015–16 as Boro achieved automatic promotion to the Premier League. He played the first three undefeated matches in the top flight, before being dropped for Antonio Barragán.

=== Birmingham City ===
Nsue signed a three-and-a-half-year contract with Birmingham City of the Championship on 18 January 2017; the fee, officially undisclosed, was believed by the Birmingham Mail to be £1m with a further £1m in add-ons. He made his debut in the starting eleven for the league visit to Norwich City on 28 January, playing at right back; Birmingham lost 2–0. He was an unused substitute for the next match, but appeared in every match thereafter, and "single-handedly tred to drag Blues up the pitch" in the final fixture of the season, away to Bristol City, which his team needed to win to avoid relegation. His only goal of the campaign came against Queens Park Rangers on 18 February in stoppage time in a 4–1 home defeat. Changes of management and personnel, and the need to stabilise a struggling team, meant Nsue was no longer a first choice in the 2017–18 side. He played regularly under Harry Redknapp's management in the early part of the season, but Steve Cotterill preferred the more defensive Maxime Colin at right back, and in the January 2018 transfer window, Nsue was allowed to leave.

=== Cyprus ===
Nsue signed a two-and-a-half-year deal with Cypriot First Division champions APOEL in January 2018; the fee was undisclosed. He went straight into the starting eleven for the visit to Doxa on 14 January; his headed goal after 26 minutes was Apoel's third in an 8–0 win. He made 26 league appearances in his first 13 months with the club, before a dispute with manager Paolo Tramezzani led to his contract being terminated for disciplinary reasons.

Having spent the 2019–20 season with another First Division club, Apollon Limassol, Nsue returned to APOEL in September 2020 on a one-year contract.

=== Tuzla City ===
Having been a free agent since leaving APOEL at the end of the 2020–21 season, Nsue signed for Bosnian Premier League club Tuzla City on 9 February 2022 until the end of the season.

He made his debut for the club on 26 February, coming on as a substitute in the second half of a 1–1 away draw against city rivals Sloboda. On 12 March 2022, he scored his first goal for Tuzla City in his fourth appearance in a 2–1 away win over Velež Mostar in the Bosnian Premier League. Only two months after joining the club, Nsue left Tuzla City in April 2022.

=== Intercity ===
On 17 June 2022, Nsue became the first signing of Intercity for the 2022–23 season, signing a two-year contract.

=== Retirement ===
On 23 August 2026, Nsue announced his retirement from professional football, both at club and national team level.

== International career ==
=== Spain ===
Nsue represented his native Spain at all under-age levels. He was a member of the under-17 squad for the 2006 European Championships, but was injured in their opening match and took no further part in the finals. He started all five matches as Spain's under-19s won the 2007 European Championships, and was again part of the squad for the following year's tournament. Spain failed to progress past the group stage, losing to both Germany and Hungary – according to UEFA's technical report, "one of the poignant images of the tournament was provided by striker Emilio Nsue who was so upset by missed chances that he played the closing minutes [against Hungary] weeping disconsolately." He scored twice in a 4–0 defeat of Bulgaria in the third group match that meant they still qualified for the 2009 FIFA U-20 World Cup. Nsue played in two of the three group stage matches, scoring twice in an 8–0 win against Tahiti, and played the whole of the round of 16 match in which Spain were eliminated by Italy. Nsue made his under-21 debut in 2009. He was part of the 2011 European title-winning squad, but appeared only once, as a substitute in the group stages against the Czech Republic.

=== Equatorial Guinea ===
Nsue's father hailed from Ebibeyin, He claimed to have turned down an invitation to represent the country at the 2012 Africa Cup of Nations as he wanted to be a part of the Spanish team for the Olympics, but he did not make the final cut. In March 2013, he signed a contract with the Equatoguinean Football Federation (FEGUIFUT), committing himself to attend all call-ups in which he was included, all expenses paid. However, Nsue did not gain Equatoguinean nationality until after playing official matches for Spain and did not ask FIFA for permission to switch allegiances.

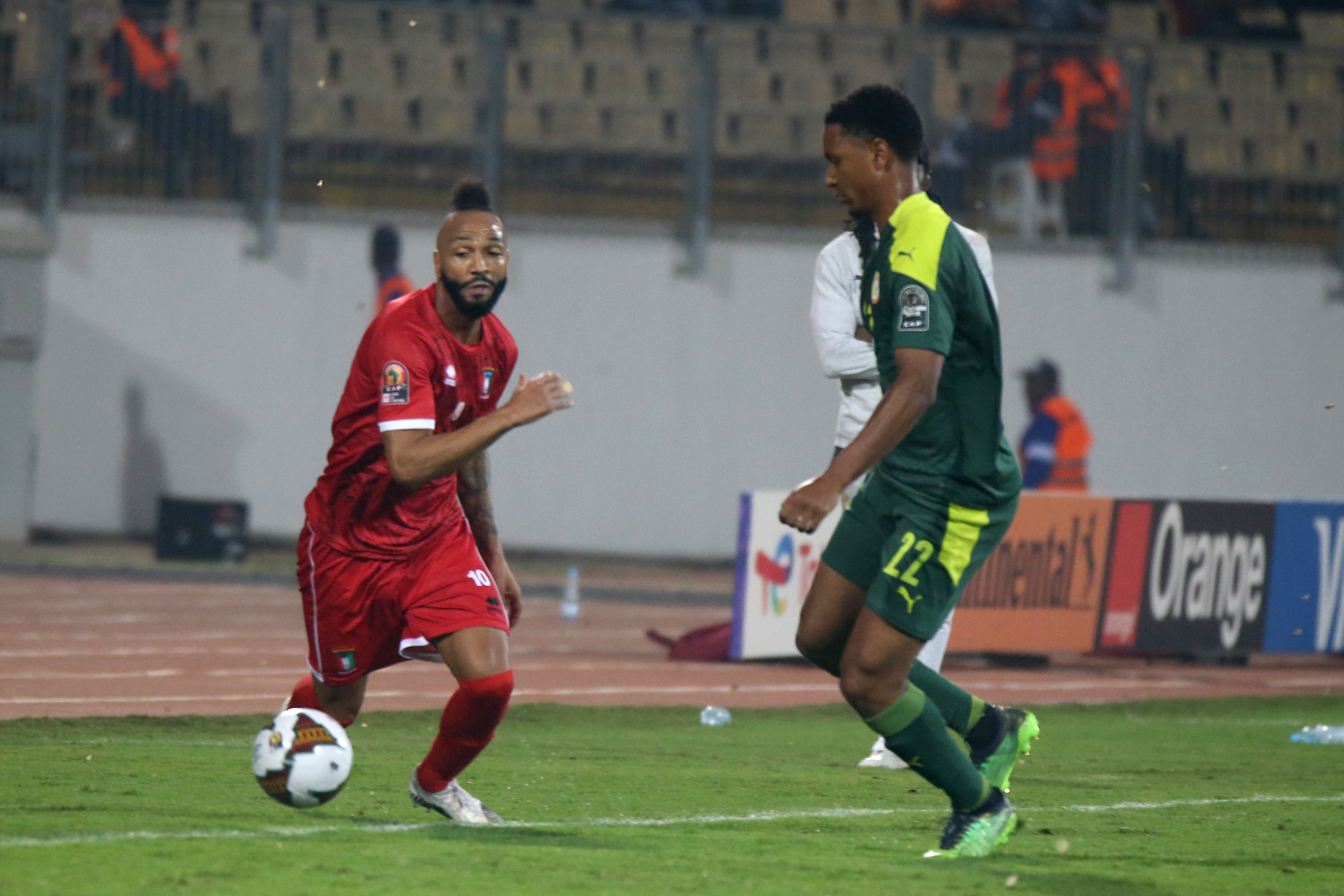
Nsue (left) playing for Equatorial Guinea at the 2021 Africa Cup of Nations.

He scored on his debut for Equatorial Guinea in an unofficial friendly with Benin on 21 March 2013; he captained the team and played the first 45 minutes. He was again captain on his first competitive appearance, when he scored a hat-trick in a 4–3 win over Cape Verde in a 2014 World Cup qualifier. FIFA later declared him ineligible for that match and for the return fixture, awarding both games to Cape Verde by a 3–0 scoreline.

Nsue continued to play for Equatorial Guinea despite FIFA declaring his ineligibility. He captained Equatorial Guinea's team as they hosted and finished fourth in the 2015 Africa Cup of Nations. He scored the tournament's opening goal in a 1–1 draw with the Republic of the Congo on 17 January at the Estadio de Bata.

Nsue also captained Equatorial Guinea at the delayed 2023 Africa Cup of Nations. On 18th January 2024, in the second group stage game of the competition, he became the 17h (Note: and last to date) and oldest (Note: at 34 years and 110 days) player to score a hat-trick in the Africa Cup of Nations, after scoring three goals against Guinea-Bissau. He finished the group stage as top scorer of the competition with five goals. In the round of 16 match against Guinea, he missed a penalty with the score deadlocked at goalless draw; however, the opponent managed to clinch the victory in stoppage time. However, he eventually managed to win the "Golden Boot" as the top scorer for the tournament. Following the tournament, Nsue was suspended indefinitely by the FEGUIFUT after he was involved in "several episodes of serious indiscipline". In response, he made a live broadcast on his Instagram account, accompanied by Iban Salvador (also suspended), where he referred to various sport officials as, "suckers, cancers and corrupt."

On 24 May 2024, Nsue was once again ruled as ineligible by FIFA. He had allegedly use a fraudulent Equatoguinean passport in which it is stated that he was born in Malabo, instead of Palma de Mallorca. In June 2024, FIFA judges ruled that Nsue was never eligible to play for Equatorial Guinea throughout his entire career. He was ruled to have continued playing for Equatorial Guinea "while undoubtedly knowing that he was ineligible" and was given a further six-month ban from playing international matches. On 5 March 2025, Nsue's request to change allegiances was accepted by FIFA, clearing him to play for Equatorial Guinea.

On 24 December 2025, he played the first 2025 Africa Cup of Nations group stage against Burkina Faso, to become at 36 years 2 months and 24 days the oldest Equatoguinean to feature in the Africa Cup of Nations. A week later, on 31 December, in the third 2025 Africa Cup of Nations group stage against Algeria, he netted a goal to become Equatorial Guinea's oldest goalscorer ever, at age 36 years 3 months and 1 day.

== Career statistics ==
=== Club ===
Club	Season	League			National cup (Note: Includes Copa del Rey, FA Cup, Cypriot Cup, Bosnian Cup)		League cup (Note: Includes Football League Cup/EFL Cup)		Other		Total	
Club	Season	Division	Apps	Goals	Apps	Goals	Apps	Goals	Apps	Goals	Apps	Goals
Mallorca	2007–08	La Liga	2	0	0	0	—		—		2	0
Mallorca	2010–11	La Liga	38	4	4	2	—		—		42	6
Mallorca	2011–12	La Liga	30	3	4	1	—		—		34	4
Mallorca	2012–13	La Liga	32	2	2	0	—		—		34	2
Mallorca	2013–14	Segunda División	40	4	1	0	—		—		41	4
Mallorca	Total		142	13	11	3	—		—		153	16
Castellón (loan)	2008–09	Segunda División	38	7	3	1	—		—		41	8
Real Sociedad (loan)	2009–10	Segunda División	33	5	1	0	—		—		34	5
Middlesbrough	2014–15	Championship	26	0	0	0	2	0	1 (Note: Appearance in Championship play-offs)	0	29	0
Middlesbrough	2015–16	Championship	40	3	1	0	5	0	—		46	3
Middlesbrough	2016–17	Premier League	4	0	0	0	1	0	—		5	0
Middlesbrough	Total		70	3	1	0	8	0	1	0	80	3
Birmingham City	2016–17	Championship	18	1	—		—		—		18	1
Birmingham City	2017–18	Championship	18	0	0	0	2	0	—		20	0
Birmingham City	Total		36	1	0	0	2	0	—		38	1
APOEL	2017–18	Cypriot First Division	17	7	1	0	—		—		18	7
APOEL	2018–19	Cypriot First Division	9	3	0	0	—		4 (Note: Appearances in UEFA Europa League)	0	13	3
APOEL	Total		26	10	1	0	—		4	0	31	10
Apollon Limassol	2019–20	Cypriot First Division	14	1	4	0	—		2	0	20	1
APOEL	2019–20	Cypriot First Division	27	3	5	0	—		3	0	35	3
Tuzla City	2021–22	Bosnian Premier League	7	1	3	1	—		—		10	2
Intercity	2022–23	Spanish Primera Federación	29	5	3	0	—		—		32	5
Intercity	2023–24	Spanish Primera Federación	30	11	0	0	—		—		30	11
Intercity	2024–25	Spanish Primera Federación	31	3							31	3
Intercity	2025–26	Segunda Federación	24	4							24	4
Intercity	Total		114	23	3	0	—		—		117	23
Career total			507	67	32	5	10	0	10	0	559	72

=== International ===
Scores and results list Equatorial Guinea's goal tally first, score column indicates score after each Nsue goal.

List of international goals scored by Emilio Nsue
No.	Date	Venue	Opponent	Score	Result	Competition
— (Note: Nsue was officially deemed an ineligible player by FIFA for this match, and thus his goals in it are not included in his tally.)	24 March 2013	Estadio de Malabo, Malabo, Equatorial Guinea	Cape Verde	1–0	0–3 (Note: Match forfeited.)	2014 FIFA World Cup qualification
—	24 March 2013	Estadio de Malabo, Malabo, Equatorial Guinea	Cape Verde	2–1	0–3	2014 FIFA World Cup qualification
—	24 March 2013	Estadio de Malabo, Malabo, Equatorial Guinea	Cape Verde	3–2	0–3	2014 FIFA World Cup qualification
1	17 January 2015	Estadio de Bata, Bata, Equatorial Guinea	Congo	1–0	1–1	2015 Africa Cup of Nations
2	14 June 2015	Estadio de Bata, Bata, Equatorial Guinea	Benin	1–1	1–1	2017 Africa Cup of Nations qualification
3	4 September 2016	Estadio de Malabo, Malabo, Equatorial Guinea	South Sudan	2–0	4–0	2017 Africa Cup of Nations qualification
4	9 October 2017	Estadio de Bata, Bata, Equatorial Guinea	Mauritius	1–0	3–1	Friendly
5	9 October 2017	Estadio de Bata, Bata, Equatorial Guinea	Mauritius	3–1	3–1	Friendly
6	8 September 2018	Estadio de Bata, Bata, Equatorial Guinea	Sudan	1–0	1–0	2019 Africa Cup of Nations qualification
7	22 March 2019	Al-Hilal Stadium, Omdurman, Sudan	Sudan	1–1	4–1	2019 Africa Cup of Nations qualification
8	22 March 2019	Al-Hilal Stadium, Omdurman, Sudan	Sudan	2–1	4–1	2019 Africa Cup of Nations qualification
9	25 March 2019	King Fahd International Stadium, Riyadh, Saudi Arabia	Saudi Arabia	1–2	2–3	Friendly
10	25 March 2019	King Fahd International Stadium, Riyadh, Saudi Arabia	Saudi Arabia	2–3	2–3	Friendly
11	8 September 2019	Estadio de Malabo, Malabo, Equatorial Guinea	South Sudan	1–0	1–0	2022 FIFA World Cup qualification
12	25 March 2021	Estadio de Malabo, Malabo, Equatorial Guinea	Tanzania	1–0	1–0	2021 Africa Cup of Nations qualification
13	7 October 2021	Estadio de Malabo, Malabo, Equatorial Guinea	Zambia	2–0	2–0	2022 FIFA World Cup qualification
14	28 March 2023	Obed Itani Chilume Stadium, Francistown, Botswana	Botswana	1–0	3–2	2023 Africa Cup of Nations qualification
15	6 September 2023	Estadio de Malabo, Malabo, Equatorial Guinea	Tunisia	1–0	1–0	2023 Africa Cup of Nations qualification
—	15 November 2023	Estadio de Malabo, Malabo, Equatorial Guinea	Namibia	1–0	0–3 (Note: Match forfeited)	2026 FIFA World Cup qualification
—	20 November 2023	Samuel Kanyon Doe Sports Complex, Monrovia, Liberia	Liberia	1–0	0–3	2026 FIFA World Cup qualification
16	18 January 2024	Alassane Ouattara Stadium, Abidjan, Ivory Coast	Guinea-Bissau	1–0	4–2	2023 Africa Cup of Nations
17	18 January 2024	Alassane Ouattara Stadium, Abidjan, Ivory Coast	Guinea-Bissau	3–1	4–2	2023 Africa Cup of Nations
18	18 January 2024	Alassane Ouattara Stadium, Abidjan, Ivory Coast	Guinea-Bissau	4–1	4–2	2023 Africa Cup of Nations
19	22 January 2024	Alassane Ouattara Stadium, Abidjan, Ivory Coast	Ivory Coast	1–0	4–0	2023 Africa Cup of Nations
20	22 January 2024	Alassane Ouattara Stadium, Abidjan, Ivory Coast	Ivory Coast	3–0	4–0	2023 Africa Cup of Nations
21	21 March 2025	Estadio de Malabo, Malabo, Equatorial Guinea	São Tomé and Príncipe	1–0	2–0	2026 FIFA World Cup qualification
22	9 June 2025	Marrakesh Stadium, Marrakesh, Morocco	Cameroon	1–1	1–1	Friendly
23	31 December 2025	Moulay El Hassan Stadium, Rabat, Morocco	Algeria	1–3	1–3	2025 Africa Cup of Nations

== Honours ==
Spain U19

- UEFA European Under-19 Championship: 2007

Spain U20

- Mediterranean Games: 2009

Spain U21

- UEFA European Under-21 Championship: 2011

Individual

- Africa Cup of Nations Golden Boot: 2023
- Africa Cup of Nations Team of the Tournament: 2023
