= Johann Lengoualama =

Gabonese footballer

Personal information
- Full name: Johann Diderot Lengoualama Boukamba
- Date of birth: 29 September 1992 (age 34)
- Place of birth: Moanda, Gabon
- Height: 1.85 m (6 ft 1 in)
- Position: Forward

Team information
- Current team: Al-Qous
- Number: 30

Senior career*
Years	Team	Apps	(Gls)
2008–2013	AS Mangasport		
2013–2015	DH El Jadidi	21	(3)
2015	RS Berkane		
2015–2016	OC Safi		
2016	Famalicão	5	(0)
2016–2017	Raja Casablanca	12	(0)
2018	AS Mangasport		
2018	Al-Faisaly		
2019	US Monastir	3	(0)
2019–2020	Jeddah	1	(0)
2022–	Al-Qous		

International career^{‡}
2012–2018	Gabon	25	(2)
- * Club domestic league appearances and goals as of 8 March 2018 ‡ National team caps and goals as of 2 April 2019

Johann Lengoualama (born 29 September 1992) is a Gabonese professional footballer who currently plays for Al-Qous as a forward.

After playing four years in Morocco with Difaâ El Jadidi and Renaissance Sportive de Berkane, Lengoualama signed for Portugal's LigaPro side F.C. Famalicão at age 23.

== Honours ==
AS Mangasport

Winner

- Gabon Championnat National D1: 2013–14
