= Germain Sanou =

Burkinabé footballer (born 1992)

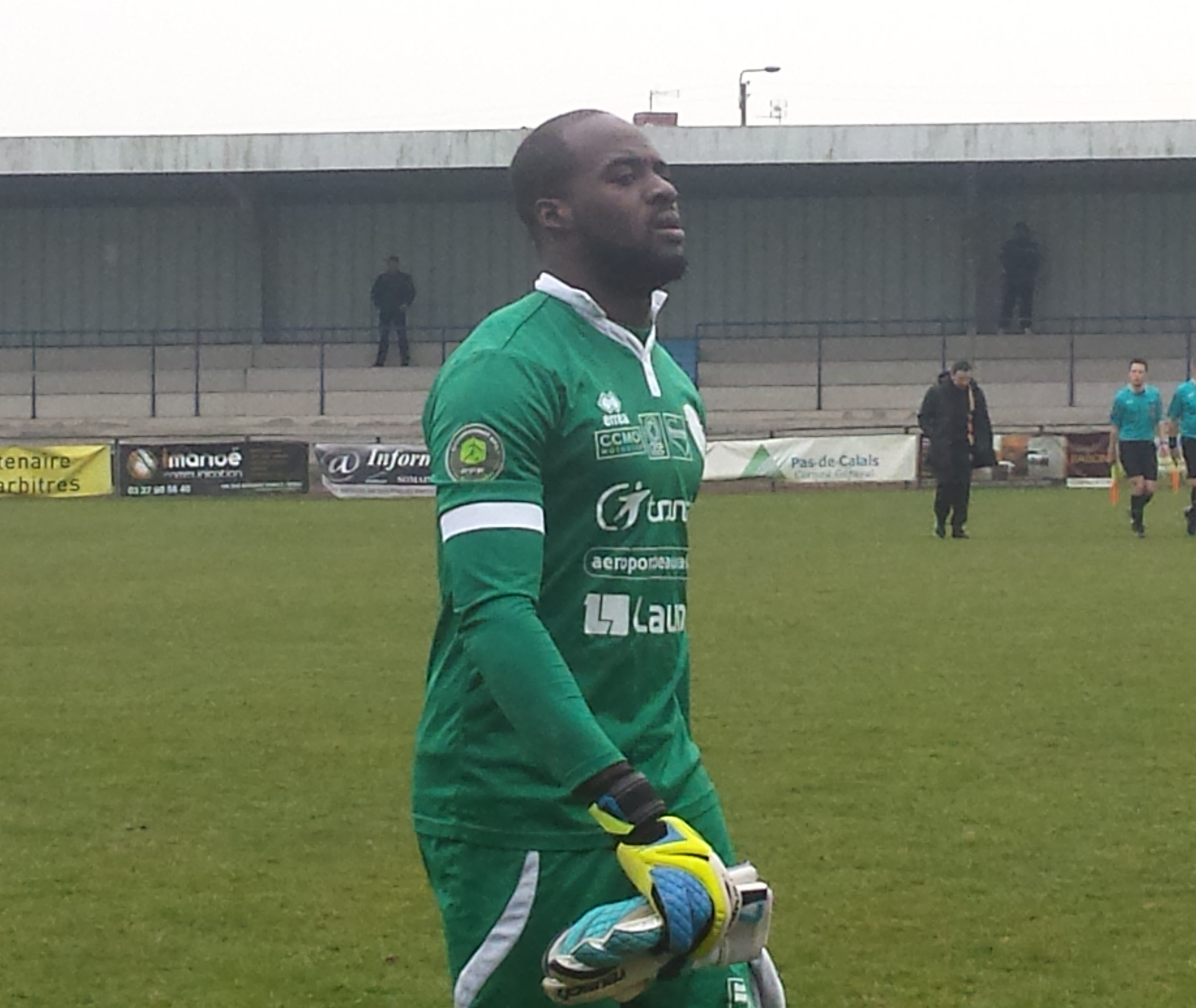
- Sanou with Beauvais in 2015

Personal information
- Full name: Moussa Germain Sanou
- Date of birth: 26 May 1992 (age 34)
- Place of birth: Bobo-Dioulasso, Burkina Faso
- Height: 1.85 m (6 ft 1 in)
- Position: Goalkeeper

Youth career
- 2009–2010: Centre Saint-Étienne Bobo

Senior career*
Years	Team	Apps	(Gls)
2010–2012	Saint-Étienne B	14	(0)
2013–2014	Drancy	9	(0)
2014–2019	Beauvais	86	(0)
2020–2026	Paris 13 Atletico	154	(0)

International career
- Burkina Faso U17
2010–2015	Burkina Faso	23	(0)
Medal record
Representing Burkina Faso
Africa Cup of Nations
Runner-up	2013 South Africa
Third place	2017 Gabon
- * Club domestic league appearances and goals as of 23 June 2026

Moussa Germain Sanou (born 26 May 1992) is a Burkinabé professional footballer who plays as a goalkeeper.

== Club career ==
Sanou has played in Burkino Faso for Centre Saint-Étienne Bobo, and in France for Saint-Étienne B, Drancy, Beauvais, and Paris 13 Atletico.

== International career ==
He played at the 2009 African U-17 Championship and the 2009 FIFA U-17 World Cup, and made his senior international debut for Burkina Faso in 2010. He was selected as part of Burkina Faso's preliminary squad for the 2015 Africa Cup of Nations.

== Career statistics ==
As of match played 2 June 2024

Appearances and goals by club, season and competition
Club	Season	League			Cup		Total	
Club	Season	Division	Apps	Goals	Apps	Goals	Apps	Goals
Saint-Étienne B	2010–11	CFA	3	0	—		3	0
Saint-Étienne B	2011–12	CFA	11	0	—		11	0
Saint-Étienne B	Total		14	0	—		14	0
Drancy	2013–14	CFA	9	0	0	0	9	0
Beauvais	2014–15	CFA	14	0	1	0	15	0
Beauvais	2015–16	CFA 2	9	0	0	0	9	0
Beauvais	2016–17	CFA 2	19	0	0	0	19	0
Beauvais	2017–18	National 2	19	0	0	0	19	0
Beauvais	2018–19	National 3	25	0	0	0	25	0
Beauvais	Total		86	0	1	0	87	0
Paris 13 Atletico	2020–21	National 2	9	0	0	0	9	0
Paris 13 Atletico	2021–22	National 2	30	0	0	0	30	0
Paris 13 Atletico	2022–23	National	30	0	2	0	32	0
Paris 13 Atletico	2023–24	National 2	24	0	0	0	24	0
Paris 13 Atletico	2024–25	National	1	0	0	0	1	0
Paris 13 Atletico	Total		94	0	2	0	96	0
Career total			203	0	3	0	206	0

== Honours ==
Paris 13 Atletico

- Championnat National 2: 2021–22
