= Kike Boula =

Equatoguinean footballer (born 1993)

Personal information
- Full name: Enrique Boula Senobua
- Date of birth: 17 July 1993 (age 33)
- Place of birth: Malabo, Equatorial Guinea
- Height: 1.74 m (5 ft 9 in)
- Position: Forward

Team information
- Current team: Polideportivo Almería

Youth career
- Oriente
- 2008–2012: Almería

Senior career*
Years	Team	Apps	(Gls)
2012–2013	Almería B	27	(0)
2013–2015	Mallorca B	41	(5)
2015–2016	Linares	28	(2)
2016–2017	Kissamikos	24	(2)
2017–2018	Xanthi	27	(0)
2019–2020	Ermis Aradippou	30	(5)
2020–2022	Futuro Kings		
2023	Atlético Porcuna	9	(0)
2023	Lynx	6	(0)
2024–2025	Naval	28	(2)
2025–	Polideportivo Almería	0	(0)

International career
2015–2020	Equatorial Guinea	30	(0)
- * Club domestic league appearances and goals as of 19:31, 20 January 2025 (UTC)

Enrique "Kike" Boula Senobua (born 17 July 1993) is an Equatoguinean professional footballer who plays as a forward for División de Honor Andaluza club Polideportivo Almería. He won 30 caps with the Equatorial Guinea national team.

== Club career ==
Born in Malabo, Boula graduated from UD Almería's youth setup. He made his senior debuts with the reserves in the 2011–12 campaign, in Segunda División B.

In the 2013 summer Boula joined another reserve team, RCD Mallorca B in Tercera División. On 11 July 2015 he signed for Linares Deportivo, newly promoted to the third level. In summer 2016, he signed with Greek Football League club Kissamikos. On 23 June 2017, after being released, he signed for Xanthi.

On 17 July 2025, Boula signed for Polideportivo Almería.

== International career ==
On 3 January 2015 Boula was included in Esteban Becker's Equatorial Guinea 23-men list for the 2015 Africa Cup of Nations. Four days later he made his full international debut, coming on as a second half substitute in a 1–1 friendly draw against Cape Verde.

== Personal life ==
Boula's cousin Sena, was also a footballer. A midfielder, he too was groomed at Almería's youth system.

== Statistics ==
=== International ===
As of 11 October 2016

Equatorial Guinea
Year	Apps	Goals
2015	8	0
2016	9	0
Total	17	0
