= Issa Gouo =

Burkinabé footballer

Personal information
- Date of birth: 9 September 1989 (age 37)
- Place of birth: Burkina Faso
- Position: Defender

Team information
- Current team: AS Kaloum

Senior career*
Years	Team	Apps	(Gls)
2009–2013	ASFA Yennenga		
2013	Santos FC Ouagadougou		
2014–	AS Kaloum		

International career^{‡}
2011–	Burkina Faso	13	(0)
- * Club domestic league appearances and goals ‡ National team caps and goals as of 3:23, 24 August 2015 (UTC)

Issa Gouo (born 9 September 1989) is a Burkina Faso professional footballer, who plays as a defender for Guinean side AS Kaloum Star and the Burkina Faso national football team.

== International career ==
In January 2014, coach Brama Traoré, invited him to be a part of the Burkina Faso squad for the 2014 African Nations Championship. The team was eliminated in the group stages after losing to Uganda and Zimbabwe and then drawing with Morocco.
