= Prince Oniangué =

Congolese footballer (born 1988)

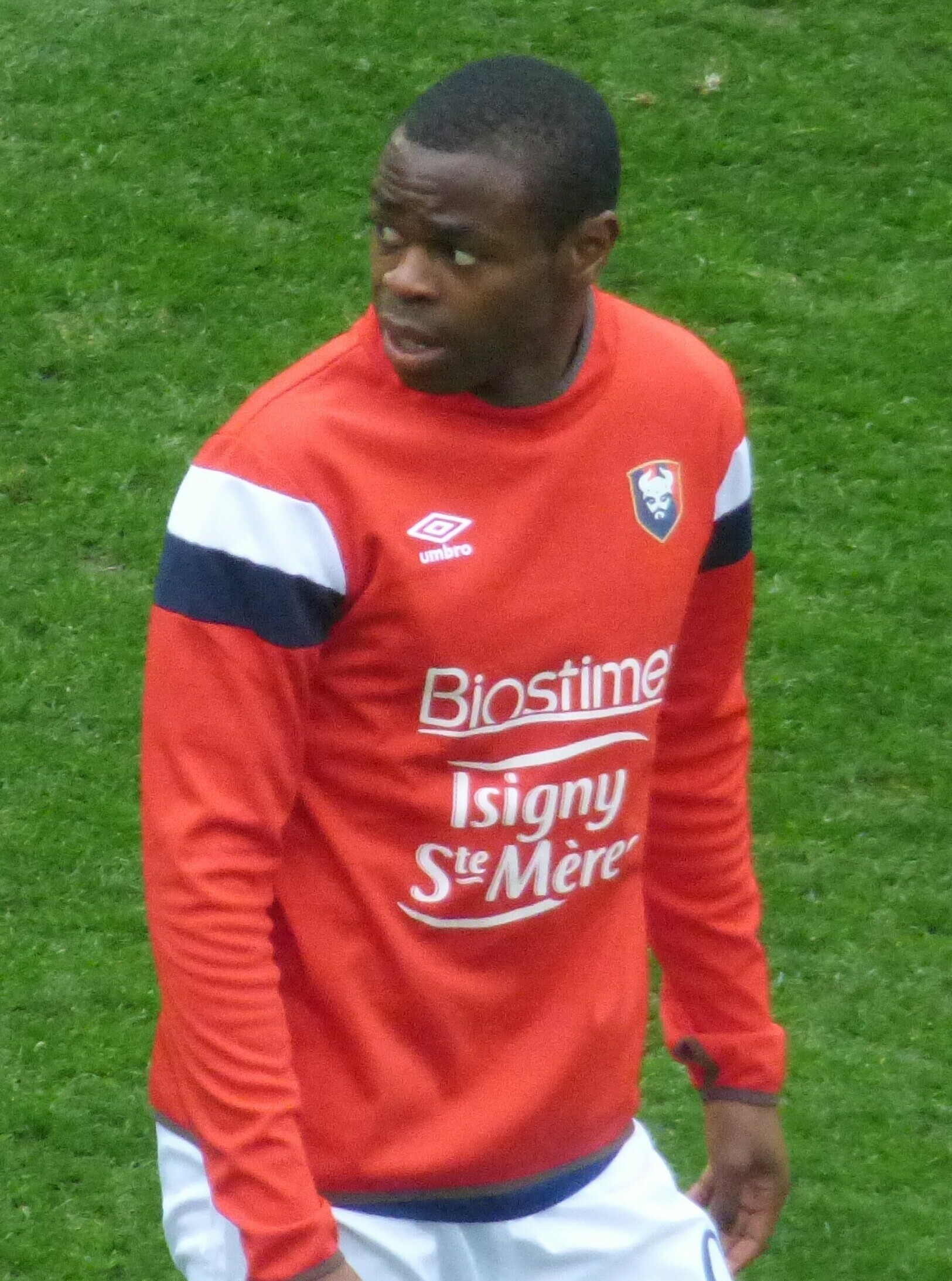
- Oniangué in 2020

Personal information
- Full name: Prince Alban Oniangué
- Date of birth: 4 November 1988 (age 38)
- Place of birth: Paris, France
- Height: 1.90 m (6 ft 3 in)
- Position: Midfielder

Youth career
- –1999: SC Hérouville
- 1999–2005: Caen
- 2005–2008: Rennes

Senior career*
Years	Team	Apps	(Gls)
2008–2010	Rennes	5	(0)
2009–2010	→ Angers (loan)	30	(1)
2010–2013	Tours	84	(13)
2013–2016	Reims	94	(17)
2016–2018	Wolverhampton Wanderers	10	(2)
2017	→ Bastia (loan)	14	(3)
2018	→ Angers (loan)	14	(1)
2018–2022	Caen	120	(12)

International career^{‡}
2008–	Congo	41	(9)
- * Club domestic league appearances and goals as of 14 May 2022 ‡ National team caps and goals as of 01:24, 11 October 2018 (UTC)

Prince Alban Oniangué (born 4 November 1988) is a professional footballer who plays as a midfielder. Born in France, he plays for the Republic of the Congo at international level.

== Club career ==
Born in Paris, Oniangué joined the youth system at Rennes in 2005 from Caen and made his senior debut in 2008. On 31 July 2009 Rennes announced that Oniangué would join Ligue 2 side Angers on loan for the 2009–10 season. He made 31 appearances during the loan.

He left Rennes and joined Ligue 2 club Tours on 6 August 2010, signing a three-year contract. On 4 June 2013, Oniangué agreed to join Ligue 1 side Reims on a three-year contract. In December 2014 he extended his contract at the club until 2019.

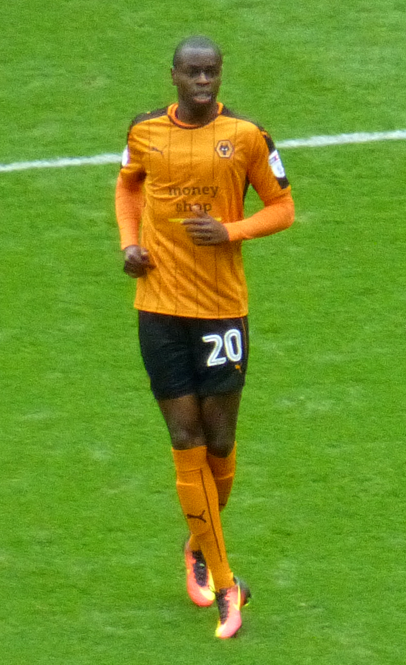
Oniangué playing for Wolverhampton Wanderers in 2016

On 15 August 2016, Oniangué signed a four-year contract with English Championship side Wolverhampton Wanderers for an undisclosed fee. He made his club debut on 20 August 2016 coming on as a substitute in a 3–1 win against Birmingham City. He scored his first goal for the club on 10 September 2016 in a 1–1 draw against Burton Albion.

After falling out of favour with then Wolves head coach Paul Lambert, on 16 January 2017, Oniangué joined Ligue 1 club Bastia for the rest of the 2016–17 season.

In January 2018, he joined Angers for second half of the 2017–18 season. On 12 July 2018, Oniangué moved to Ligue 1 club Caen on a permanent deal. In June 2022, he was released from the club at the expiration of his contract.

== International career ==
Oniangué made his debut for the Congo national team in a 2010 World Cup qualifying match against Sudan on 11 October 2008.

On 21 January 2015, Oniangué scored the only goal of a 2015 Africa Cup of Nations group match against Gabon to give Congo its first win at the Africa Cup of Nations since 1974.

== Career statistics ==
=== Club ===
As of match played 4 July 2022

Appearances and goals by club, season and competition
Club	Season	League			Cup		League Cup		Other		Total	
Club	Season	Division	Apps	Goals	Apps	Goals	Apps	Goals	Apps	Goals	Apps	Goals
Rennes	2008–09	Ligue 1	5	0	0	0	0	0	—		5	0
Rennes	2009–10	Ligue 1	0	0	0	0	0	0	—		0	0
Rennes	Total		5	0	0	0	0	0	—		5	0
Angers (loan)	2009–10	Ligue 2	30	1	1	0	0	0	—		31	1
Angers (loan)	Total		30	1	1	0	0	0	—		31	1
Tours	2010–11	Ligue 2	37	3	0	0	0	0	—		37	3
Tours	2011–12	Ligue 2	19	1	3	0	1	1	—		23	2
Tours	2012–13	Ligue 2	28	9	0	0	0	0	—		28	9
Tours	Total		84	13	3	0	1	1	—		88	14
Reims	2013–14	Ligue 1	35	10	1	0	2	1	—		38	11
Reims	2014–15	Ligue 1	32	3	0	0	0	0	—		32	3
Reims	2015–16	Ligue 1	27	4	0	0	1	0	—		28	4
Reims	Total		94	17	1	0	3	1	—		98	18
Wolverhampton Wanderers	2016–17	Championship	10	2	0	0	1	0	—		11	2
Wolverhampton Wanderers	2017–18	Championship	0	0	0	0	0	0	—		0	0
Wolverhampton Wanderers	Total		10	2	0	0	1	0	0	0	11	2
Bastia (loan)	2016–17	Ligue 1	15	3	0	0	0	0	—		15	3
Angers (loan)	2017–18	Ligue 1	14	1	0	0	1	0	—		15	1
Caen	2018–19	Ligue 1	31	2	1	0	0	0	—		32	2
Caen	2019–20	Ligue 2	21	5	0	0	3	0	—		29	5
Caen	2020–21	Ligue 2	33	2	0	0	0	0	—		33	2
Caen	2021–22	Ligue 2	35	3	0	0	1	0	—		36	4
Caen	Total		120	12	1	0	4	0	—		125	12
Career total			372	49	6	0	10	2	0	0	431	51

=== International ===
As of match played 11 October 2018

National team	Year	Apps	Goals
Congo	2008	1	0
Congo	2009	1	0
Congo	2010	2	0
Congo	2011	3	1
Congo	2012	4	0
Congo	2013	5	0
Congo	2014	7	2
Congo	2015	9	3
Congo	2016	2	1
Congo	2017	5	0
Congo	2018	2	2
Total		41	9

=== International goals ===
Scores and results list Congo's goal tally first.

No.	Date	Venue	Opponent	Score	Result	Competition
1.	11 November 2011	Estádio Nacional 12 de Julho, São Tomé, São Tomé and Príncipe	São Tomé and Príncipe	4–0	5–0	2014 FIFA World Cup qualification
2.	6 September 2014	U. J. Esuene Stadium, Calabar, Nigeria	Nigeria	1–1	3–2	2015 Africa Cup of Nations qualification
3.	10 September 2014	Stade Municipal, Pointe-Noire, Congo	Sudan	2–0	2–0	2015 Africa Cup of Nations qualification
4.	10 January 2015	Stade Léopold Sédar Senghor, Dakar, Senegal	Cape Verde	2–0	2–3	Friendly
5.	21 January 2015	Estadio de Bata, Bata, Equatorial Guinea	Gabon	1–0	1–0	2015 Africa Cup of Nations
6.	14 June 2015	Stade Alphonse Massemba-Débat, Brazzaville, Congo	Kenya	1–1	1–1	2017 Africa Cup of Nations qualification
7.	4 June 2016	Moi International Sports Centre, Nairobi, Kenya	Kenya	1–0	1–2	2017 Africa Cup of Nations qualification
8.	25 March 2018	Aimé Bergéal, Mantes-la-Jolie, France	Guinea-Bissau	1–0	2–0	Friendly
9.	11 October 2018	Stade Alphonse Massemba-Débat, Brazzaville, Congo	Liberia	3–1	3–1	2019 Africa Cup of Nations qualification
