= Iban Salvador =

Equatoguinean footballer (born 1995)

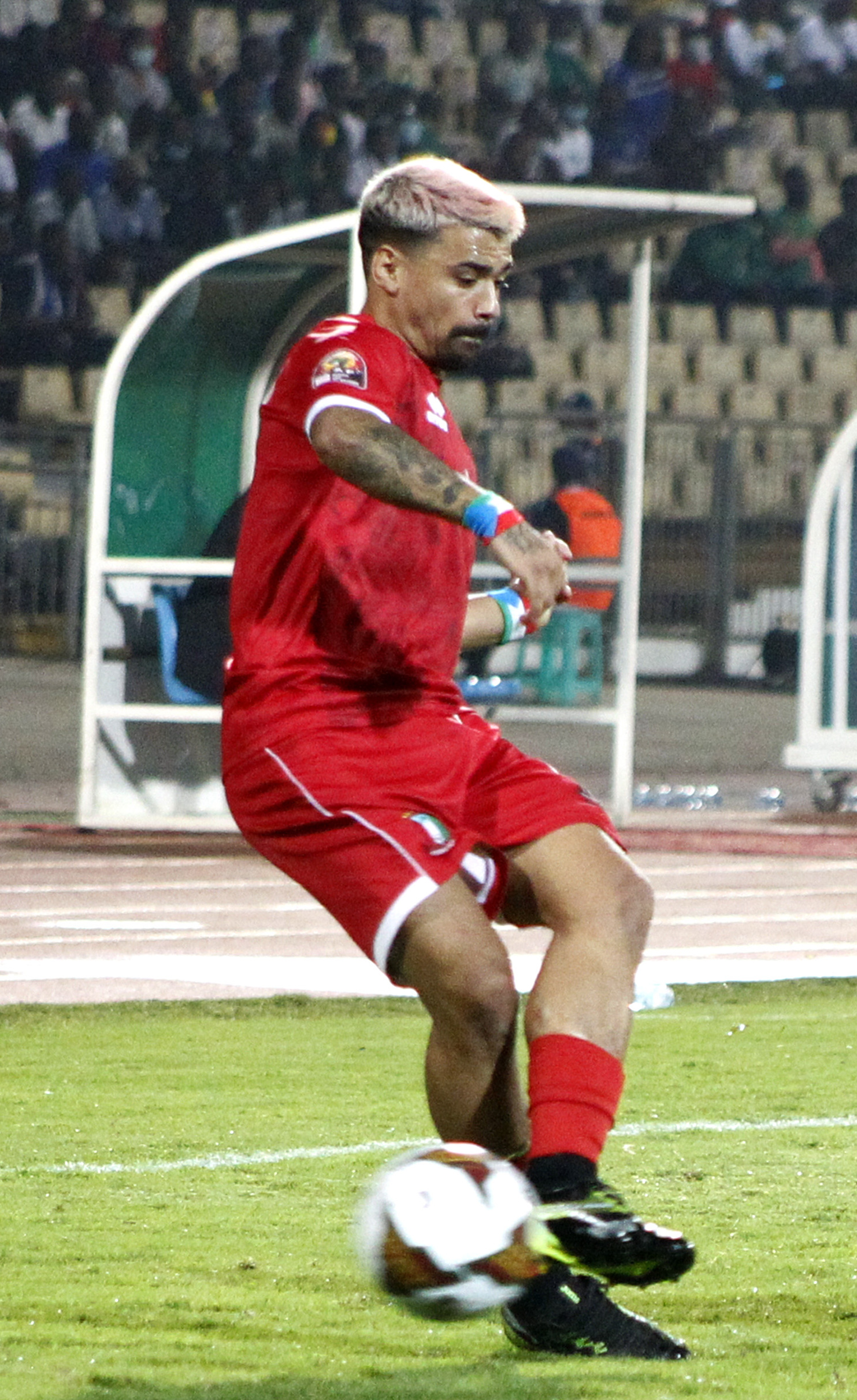
- Salvador with Equatorial Guinea in 2022

Personal information
- Full name: Iván Salvador Edú
- Date of birth: 11 December 1995 (age 30)
- Place of birth: L'Hospitalet, Spain
- Height: 1.73 m (5 ft 8 in)
- Position: Forward

Youth career
- 2002–2013: Hospitalet

Senior career*
| Years | Team | Apps | (Gls) |
| 2013–2014 | Hospitalet | 20 | (5) |
| 2014–2016 | Valencia B | 55 | (8) |
| 2016–2018 | Valladolid | 24 | (4) |
| 2017 | → UCAM Murcia (loan) | 15 | (1) |
| 2018 | → Cultural Leonesa (loan) | 10 | (0) |
| 2018–2019 | Celta B | 32 | (10) |
| 2019–2023 | Fuenlabrada | 98 | (8) |
| 2023 | Ceuta | 0 | (0) |
| 2023–2024 | Miedź Legnica | 19 | (1) |
| 2024–2026 | Wisła Płock | 46 | (5) |

International career^{‡}
| 2015– | Equatorial Guinea | 58 | (10) |
- * Club domestic league appearances and goals as of 18:11, 29 May 2026 (UTC) ‡ National team caps and goals as of 13:57, 1 January 2026 (UTC)

Iván "Iban" Salvador Edú (born 11 December 1995), also known as Iban Edú in Africa, is a professional footballer who plays as a forward. Born in Spain, he plays for the Equatorial Guinea national team.

Salvador began his career at Hospitalet, and after his first season was signed by Valencia, where he made one first-team appearance in the Copa del Rey. He achieved totals of 122 games and 11 goals in the Segunda División for Valladolid, UCAM Murcia, Cultural Leonesa and Fuenlabrada.

A full international for Equatorial Guinea since 2015, he was chosen for the Africa Cup of Nations in 2015, 2021, 2023 and 2025, helping the team to fourth place in the first of those tournaments.

== Club career ==
Born in L'Hospitalet de Llobregat, Barcelona, Catalonia, Salvador joined hometown club CE L'Hospitalet's youth setup in 2002, aged six. He made his senior debut on 27 October 2013, coming on as a second-half substitute for Enrique Carreño in a 3–2 home win against Villarreal CF B in the Segunda División B championship.

Salvador scored his first goal on 10 November, netting the last in a 5–0 away routing over AE Prat. He finished the campaign with 26 appearances and five goals, as his side missed out on promotion in the play-offs.

On 4 August 2014, Salvador joined Valencia CF, being assigned to the reserves also in the third level. He made his only first-team appearance on 10 February 2016 in the semi-finals of the Copa del Rey at home to FC Barcelona; both teams made changes due to the visitors' 7–0 win in the first leg, with him coming on as an 80th-minute substitute for Fran Villalba.

On 20 July 2016, Salvador signed a three-year contract with Segunda División side Real Valladolid, with Valencia retaining a buy-back clause. He made his professional debut on 21 August, starting in a 1–0 Segunda División home win against Real Oviedo, and scored his first goal in the category on 2 October, netting his team's second in a 2–3 away loss against Levante UD.

On 25 January 2017, Salvador was loaned to fellow second-tier club UCAM Murcia CF until the end of the season. On 10 July 2018, after a six-month loan deal at Cultural y Deportiva Leonesa, he moved to Celta de Vigo B in the third division after agreeing to a three-year contract.

On 5 July 2019, Salvador signed a two-year deal with CF Fuenlabrada, newly promoted to the second division. A year later, he extended his contract to 2023, and then to 2024. In 2020–21, he was the most fouled player in the top two Spanish leagues after Lionel Messi; opponents claimed this was due to his simulation, and manager José Ramón Sandoval said it was "persecution".

After leaving Fuenlabrada in mid-2023, Salvador signed with AD Ceuta FC on 10 July 2023. He failed to make an appearance however, and on 12 September that year he moved abroad to join Polish I liga side Miedź Legnica on a one-year deal with an option for another season. He was released by the club at the end of the 2023–24 season.

On 30 July 2024, Salvador signed a two-year deal with another Polish second-tier club Wisła Płock. He was released by Wisła at the end of the 2025–26 season.

== International career ==
Salvador's maternal grandfather was born in the then Spanish Guinea (from an area near Mongomo) and arrived in Catalonia in the 1960s along with his Galician wife, making him eligible to both Equatorial Guinea and Spain. On 7 January 2015, he made his full international debut for Equatorial Guinea, starting in a 1–1 friendly draw against Cape Verde.

The day after his debut, Salvador was included in Esteban Becker's 23-man list for the 2015 Africa Cup of Nations held on home soil. He made his debut in the competition on the 17th, starting in a 1–1 draw against Congo, and scored his first goal in a 2–0 defeat of Gabon, which put the nation into the quarter-finals of the Africa Cup of Nations for the second time in its history, eventually finishing in fourth place.

Salvador scored the only goal on 15 November 2020 in a home win over Libya in 2021 Africa Cup of Nations qualification. At the finals in Cameroon, he was man of the match in group wins over Algeria and Sierra Leone, assisting Pablo Ganet for the only goal in the latter; he then scored in a last-16 penalty shootout victory against Mali.

== Career statistics ==
=== Club ===
As of match played 23 May 2026

Appearances and goals by club, season and competition
| Club | Season | League | | | National cup (Note: Includes Copa del Rey, Polish Cup) | | Continental | | Other | | Total | |
| Club | Season | Division | Apps | Goals | Apps | Goals | Apps | Goals | Apps | Goals | Apps | Goals |
|---|---|---|---|---|---|---|---|---|---|---|---|---|
| L'Hospitalet | 2013–14 | Segunda División B | 20 | 5 | 1 | 0 | — | | 6 (Note: Appearance(s) in Segunda División B Promotion play-offs) | 0 | 27 | 5 |
| Valencia B | 2014–15 | Segunda División B | 29 | 3 | — | | — | | — | | 29 | 3 |
| Valencia B | 2015–16 | Segunda División B | 26 | 5 | — | | — | | — | | 26 | 5 |
| Valencia B | Total | | 55 | 8 | — | | — | | — | | 55 | 8 |
| Valencia | 2015–16 | La Liga | 0 | 0 | 1 | 0 | 0 | 0 | — | | 1 | 0 |
| Valladolid | 2016–17 | Segunda División | 10 | 1 | 2 | 0 | — | | — | | 12 | 1 |
| Valladolid | 2017–18 | Segunda División | 19 | 3 | 1 | 0 | — | | 0 | 0 | 20 | 3 |
| Valladolid | Total | | 29 | 4 | 3 | 0 | — | | 0 | 0 | 32 | 4 |
| UCAM Murcia (loan) | 2016–17 | Segunda División | 15 | 1 | 0 | 0 | — | | — | | 15 | 1 |
| Cultural Leonesa (loan) | 2017–18 | Segunda División | 10 | 0 | 0 | 0 | — | | — | | 10 | 0 |
| Celta B | 2018–19 | Segunda División B | 32 | 10 | — | | — | | 1 (Note: Appearance(s) in Segunda División B Relegation play-offs) | 0 | 33 | 10 |
| Fuenlabrada | 2019–20 | Segunda División | 24 | 4 | 1 | 0 | — | | — | | 25 | 4 |
| Fuenlabrada | 2020–21 | Segunda División | 31 | 2 | 2 | 0 | — | | — | | 33 | 2 |
| Fuenlabrada | 2021–22 | Segunda División | 13 | 0 | 1 | 0 | — | | — | | 14 | 0 |
| Fuenlabrada | 2022–23 | Primera Federación | 30 | 2 | 1 | 0 | — | | — | | 31 | 2 |
| Fuenlabrada | Total | | 98 | 8 | 5 | 0 | — | | — | | 103 | 8 |
| Miedź Legnica | 2023–24 | I liga | 19 | 1 | 1 | 0 | — | | — | | 20 | 1 |
| Wisła Płock | 2024–25 | I liga | 27 | 3 | 1 | 0 | — | | 2 (Note: Appearances in I liga promotion play-offs) | 0 | 30 | 3 |
| Wisła Płock | 2025–26 | Ekstraklasa | 17 | 2 | 1 | 0 | — | | — | | 18 | 2 |
| Wisła Płock | Total | | 44 | 5 | 2 | 0 | — | | 2 | 0 | 48 | 5 |
| Career total | | | 322 | 42 | 13 | 0 | 0 | 0 | 9 | 0 | 344 | 42 |

=== International ===
As of match played 31 December 2025

Appearances and goals by national team and year
| National team | Year | Apps | Goals |
|---|---|---|---|
| Equatorial Guinea | 2015 | 12 | 2 |
| Equatorial Guinea | 2016 | 2 | 0 |
| Equatorial Guinea | 2018 | 4 | 0 |
| Equatorial Guinea | 2019 | 3 | 0 |
| Equatorial Guinea | 2020 | 2 | 1 |
| Equatorial Guinea | 2021 | 4 | 1 |
| Equatorial Guinea | 2022 | 5 | 0 |
| Equatorial Guinea | 2023 | 6 | 1 |
| Equatorial Guinea | 2024 | 9 | 3 |
| Equatorial Guinea | 2025 | 11 | 2 |
| Total | | 58 | 10 |

Scores and results list Equatorial Guinea's goal tally first, score column indicates score after each Salvador goal.

List of international goals scored by Iban Salvador
| No. | Date | Venue | Opponent | Score | Result | Competition | Ref. |
|---|---|---|---|---|---|---|---|
| 1 | 25 January 2015 | Estadio de Bata, Bata, Equatorial Guinea | Gabon | 2–0 | 2–0 | 2015 Africa Cup of Nations | |
| 2 | 29 March 2015 | Felix Houphouet Boigny Stadium, Abidjan, Ivory Coast | Ivory Coast | 1–0 | 1–1 | Friendly | |
| 3 | 15 November 2020 | Estadio de Bata, Bata, Equatorial Guinea | Libya | 1–0 | 1–0 | 2021 Africa Cup of Nations qualification | |
| 4 | 7 September 2021 | Estadio de Malabo, Malabo, Equatorial Guinea | Mauritania | 1–0 | 1–0 | 2022 FIFA World Cup qualification | |
| 5 | 28 March 2023 | Obed Itani Chilume Stadium, Francistown, Botswana | Botswana | 3–1 | 3–2 | 2023 Africa Cup of Nations qualification | |
| 6 | 14 January 2024 | Alassane Ouattara Stadium, Anyama, Ivory Coast | Nigeria | 1–0 | 1–1 | 2023 Africa Cup of Nations | |
| 7 | 10 June 2024 | Estadio de Malabo, Malabo, Equatorial Guinea | Malawi | 1–0 | 1–0 | 2026 FIFA World Cup qualification | |
| 8 | 11 October 2024 | Estadio de Malabo, Malabo, Equatorial Guinea | Liberia | 1–0 | 1–0 | 2025 Africa Cup of Nations qualification | |
| 9 | 21 March 2025 | Estadio de Malabo, Malabo, Equatorial Guinea | São Tomé and Príncipe | 2–0 | 2–0 | 2026 FIFA World Cup qualification | |
| 10 | 4 September 2025 | Honor Stadium, Oujda, Morocco | São Tomé and Príncipe | 2–2 | 3–2 | 2026 FIFA World Cup qualification | |
