= Sipo (footballer) =

Equatoguinean footballer (born 1988)

Personal information
- Full name: Armando Sipoto Bohale Aqueriaco
- Date of birth: 21 April 1988 (age 38)
- Place of birth: Alicante, Spain
- Height: 1.78 m (5 ft 10 in)
- Position: Left-back

Youth career
- 1997–2007: Alicante

Senior career*
Years	Team	Apps	(Gls)
2007–2009	Alicante B		
2009–2010	Alicante	18	(0)
2010	Torrellano Illice	7	(0)
2011	Jove Español	13	(1)
2011–2012	Badajoz	18	(0)
2012	Cádiz	0	(0)
2012–2013	Teruel	17	(0)
2013	Osasuna B	15	(0)
2013–2014	Pandurii	7	(1)
2014–2015	AEK Larnaca	2	(0)
2015–2016	Olímpic Xàtiva	2	(0)
2018–2019	Alicante	1	(0)

International career
2006–2015	Equatorial Guinea	27	(0)
- * Club domestic league appearances and goals as of 13 May 2018

Armando Sipoto Bohale Aqueriaco (born 21 April 1988), commonly known as Sipo, is a former professional footballer who played as a left-back.

He spent all but his senior career in Spain, but never in higher than Segunda División B. His professional input consisted of a combined nine matches for Pandurii (Romania) and AEK Larnaca (Cyprus).

Born in Spain, Sipo capped for the Equatorial Guinea national team.

== Club career ==
Born in Alicante, Spain, Sipo only played lower league football in that country. He represented Alicante CF, CD Badajoz, Cádiz CF, CD Teruel and CA Osasuna B in Segunda División B, and Alicante's B-team (which he helped promote from the regional leagues in his first season), Torrellano Illice CF and FC Jove Español San Vicente in Tercera División.

In 2008–09, Sipo won another promotion with Alicante B but, as the first team was relegated from Segunda División, the former were also forced to drop down a level. He split the 2012–13 campaign with three clubs, playing one Copa del Rey game with Cádiz and also appearing for Teruel and Osasuna's reserves.

Sipo made his professional debut with CS Pandurii Târgu Jiu in Romania. He scored in first appearance in Liga I, a 1–1 away draw against FC Petrolul Ploiești on 29 July 2013.

== International career ==
Born to Equatoguinean parents, Sipo decided to represent Equatorial Guinea internationally. He made his debut on 29 March 2006 in a 2–0 friendly win against Benin in Malabo, being this the first time he entered his adopted nation.

Sipo was called to the squad that appeared in the 2012 Africa Cup of Nations played on home soil, being an unused member during the tournament due to an injury which he contracted in a friendly and from which he did not fully recover.
