= Rui da Gracia =

Spanish footballer (born 1985)

Rui
Personal information
- Full name: Rui Fernando da Gracia Gomes
- Date of birth: 28 May 1985 (age 41)
- Place of birth: Bembibre, Spain
- Height: 1.93 m (6 ft 4 in)
- Position: Centre-back

Team information
- Current team: Colmenar Viejo
- Number: 5

Youth career
- Bembibre

Senior career*
Years	Team	Apps	(Gls)
2004–2005	Bembibre		
2005–2006	Elche B		
2006–2007	Elche Ilicitano		
2007–2009	Real Ávila	73	(7)
2009–2011	Palencia	57	(3)
2011–2012	Logroñés	11	(0)
2012–2013	Enosis Neon Paralimni	30	(0)
2013–2014	Real Ávila	28	(0)
2014–2018	Hibernians	54	(1)
2018–2019	Villarrubia	38	(1)
2019–2022	Gimnástica Segoviana	67	(3)
2022–2023	Collado Villalba	19	(0)
2023–	Colmenar Viejo	13	(0)

International career^{‡}
2010–2021	Equatorial Guinea	38	(1)
- * Club domestic league appearances and goals as of 2 June 2024. ‡ National team caps and goals as of 7 September 2021

Rui Fernando da Gracia Gomes (born 28 May 1985), simply known as Rui, is a professional footballer who plays as a centre-back for Preferente Madrid club Colmenar Viejo. Born and raised in Spain to Cape Verdean parents, he has been capped for the Equatorial Guinea national team.

== Early life ==
Rui was born in Bembibre, Castile and León to Cape Verdean parents from São Nicolau, who had emigrated to Portugal in the mid-1970s and then to Spain.

== Club career ==
Rui is a product of CA Bembibre. He has developed most of his club career in his homecountry Spain, also playing in Cyprus and Malta, where he was a two-time Maltese Premier League champion with Hibernians FC.

== International career ==
Rui represented Cape Verde in the 2003 and 2009 editions of Mundialito, a Spanish-based tournament where the participant teams are entirely composed by amateur footballers from the different foreign diasporas in Spain and were not linked to their respective official national teams. He was never contacted by the Cape Verdean Football Federation to play for the official Cape Verde national team. He also played for the Spanish autonomous team of Castile and León.

While playing for Spanish club CF Palencia, Rui was invited by Equatorial Guinean international midfielder Benjamín Zarandona, who was then his teammate, to become a naturalised citizen of Equatorial Guinea in order to play for its national team.

In July 2010, Rui received his first call for the Equatoguinean senior team and to play a friendly match against Morocco on 11 August 2010. However, he didn't attend due to injury.

Rui's first incursion with Equatorial Guinea on 12 October 2010, when he participated in a friendly lost against Botswana by 0–2 in Malabo.

Rui was part of the squad for the 2012 Africa Cup of Nations and the 2015 Africa Cup of Nations, being a first-choice defender for the Nzalang Nacional.

=== International goals ===
Scores and results list Equatorial Guinea's goal tally first.

Goal	Date	Venue	Opponent	Score	Result	Competition
1.	15 November 2015	Estadio de Bata, Bata, Equatorial Guinea	Morocco	1–0	1–0	2018 FIFA World Cup qualification
