= Dimitri Bissiki =

Congolese professional footballer

Personal information
- Full name: Dimitri Magnokele Bissiki
- Date of birth: 17 March 1991 (age 35)
- Place of birth: Congo
- Position: Defender

Team information
- Current team: Léopards
- Number: 6

Senior career*
| Years | Team | Apps | (Gls) |
| 2011– | Léopards | 136 | (4) |

International career
| 2013– | Congo | 16 | (0) |
- * Club domestic league appearances and goals

Dimitri Magnokele Bissiki is a Congolese professional footballer, who plays as a defender for AC Léopards.

== International career ==
In January 2014, coach Claude Le Roy, invited him to be a part of the Congo squad for the 2014 African Nations Championship. The team was eliminated in the group stages after losing to Ghana, drawing with Libya and defeating Ethiopia.

== Honours ==
=== Winner ===
- Congo Premier League (2): 2012, 2013, 2014
- CAF Confederation Cup: 2012

=== Runner-up ===
- CAF Super Cup: 2013
