= Boris Moubhio Ngonga =

Congolese footballer

Boris Ngonga
Personal information
- Full name: Boris Moubhio Ngonga
- Date of birth: 25 November 1988 (age 37)
- Place of birth: Congo
- Position: Defender

Team information
- Current team: Léopards
- Number: 5

Senior career*
Years	Team	Apps	(Gls)
2008–	Léopards	478	(31)

International career
2012–	Congo	25	(1)
- * Club domestic league appearances and goals

Boris Moubhibo Ngonga is a Congolese professional footballer who plays as a defender for AC Léopards.

== Honours ==
AC Léopards

Winner

- Congo Premier League (5): 2012, 2013, 2014, 2015, 2016
- CAF Confederation Cup: 2012

Runner-up

- CAF Super Cup: 2013

== International career ==
In January 2014, coach Claude Le Roy, invited him to be a part of the Congo squad for the 2014 African Nations Championship. The team was eliminated in the group stages after losing to Ghana, drawing with Libya and defeating Ethiopia.
