= Sagesse Babélé =

Congolese footballer

Personal information
- Full name: Sagesse Babélé
- Date of birth: 13 February 1993 (age 33)
- Place of birth: Congo
- Height: 1.87 m (6 ft 2 in)
- Position: Defender

Senior career*
Years	Team	Apps	(Gls)
2012–2016	Léopards	64	(2)
2016	Al-Khaleej		

International career^{‡}
2014–	Congo	17	(0)
- * Club domestic league appearances and goals ‡ National team caps and goals as of 15 November 2015

Sagesse Babélé (born 13 February 1993) is a Congolese international footballer who currently plays as a midfielder.

== Honours ==
AC Léopards

Winner

- Congo Premier League (2): 2012, 2013, 2014
- CAF Confederation Cup: 2012

Runner-up

- CAF Super Cup: 2013
