= Evuy (footballer) =

Equatoguinean footballer (born 1985)

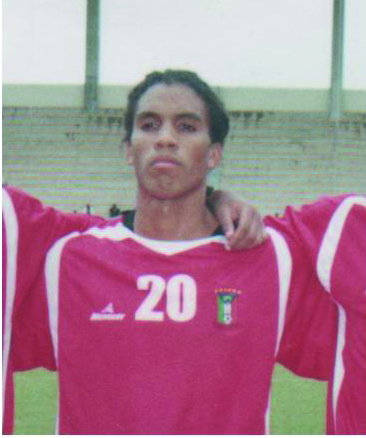
- Evuy with Equatorial Guinea

Personal information
- Full name: Daniel Vázquez Evuy
- Date of birth: 11 March 1985 (age 41)
- Place of birth: Madrid, Spain
- Height: 1.83 m (6 ft 0 in)
- Positions: Centre-back; right-back; right midfielder

Youth career
- 1995–1999: Móstoles
- 1999–2003: Rayo Vallecano

Senior career*
Years	Team	Apps	(Gls)
2002–2003	Rayo Vallecano B		
2004	Murcia B		
2004–2006	Alcorcón B		
2005–2006	Alcorcón	8	(0)
2006–2007	Móstoles		
2007–2008	El Álamo	21	(1)
2008	Atlético Esquivias	5	(0)
2008–2009	Puerta Bonita	22	(0)
2009–2012	Villaviciosa de Odón	93	(3)
2013	Tallinna Kalev	29	(0)
2015	New York Cosmos B		
2017–2018	Las Rozas	28	(0)

International career^{‡}
2006	Equatorial Guinea U23		
2006–2015	Equatorial Guinea	25	(0)
- * Club domestic league appearances and goals as of 3 June 2018 ‡ National team caps and goals as of 25 January 2015

Daniel Vázquez Evuy (born 11 March 1985), known as Evuy, is a former footballer who played as a defender. Born and raised in Spain to a Spanish father and an Equatorial Guinean mother, he capped for the Equatorial Guinea national team.

Currently, he is a collaborator on the Twitch channel of El Chiringuito, a football-related Spanish television program. He is also dedicated to business development and intermediation in the sports market. In the same way, he is an expert in communication and media.

== Early life ==
Evuy was born on 11 March 1985 in Madrid to a Spanish father and an Equatorial Guinean Bubi mother.

== Club career ==
Evuy began his career in the CD Mostoles, a club of Madrid south. Before Evuy go to the Rayo vallecano of Madrid where be six years. In the Rayo Vallecano national category he was selected for the Madrid Community selection during two years. After there were rumors that were placing the player in the VFB Stuttgart.

== International career ==
Evuy was called for play with the Equatorial Guinea national team in the Africa Cup of Nations 2008 Qualifying match against Cameroon on 7 October 2006.
