= Diosdado Mbele =

Equatoguinean footballer (born 1997)

Personal information
- Full name: Diosdado Mbele Mba Mangue
- Date of birth: 8 April 1997 (age 29)
- Place of birth: Malabo, Equatorial Guinea
- Height: 1.84 m (6 ft 0 in)
- Positions: Centre-back; right-back

Team information
- Current team: Malabo United

Youth career
- Leones Vegetarianos

Senior career*
Years	Team	Apps	(Gls)
2012–2015	Leones Vegetarianos	43	(4)
2015–2016	Hibernians	10	(0)
2017	Kajaani	11	(0)
2018	Leones Vegetarianos		
2019–2020	Akonangui		
2020–202?	Futuro Kings		
202?–2024	Leones Vegetarianos		
2024–	Malabo United		

International career^{‡}
2013–	Equatorial Guinea	24	(0)
- * Club domestic league appearances and goals as of 10 Sept 2018 ‡ National team caps and goals as of 10 Sept 2018

Diosdado Mbele Mba Mangue (born 8 April 1997) is an Equatoguinean footballer who plays as a centre-back for LIFGE club Malabo United and the Equatorial Guinea national team.
