= Viera Ellong =

Cameroonian footballer

Personal information
- Full name: Viera Ellong Doualla
- Date of birth: 17 June 1987 (age 39)
- Place of birth: Douala, Cameroon
- Height: 1.81 m (5 ft 11 in)
- Position: Midfielder

Team information
- Current team: Futuro Kings

Senior career*
| Years | Team | Apps | (Gls) |
| 2005 | Mount Cameroun | | |
| 2005 | Caiman | | |
| 2006–2009 | Akonangui | | |
| 2010–2011 | Sony de Elá Nguema | | |
| 2012–2013 | Cercle Mbéri Sportif | | |
| 2013–2015 | The Panthers | | |
| 2015–2017 | Kerkyra | 47 | (11) |
| 2017–2018 | Platanias | 9 | (0) |
| 2018–2019 | Diagoras | 0 | (0) |
| 2019 | Poros | | |
| 2020 | Leones Vegetarianos | 1+ | (1+) |
| 2020– | Futuro Kings | 0 | (0) |

International career^{‡}
| 2011–2017 | Equatorial Guinea | 31 | (2) |
- * Club domestic league appearances and goals as of 15 January 2020 ‡ National team caps and goals as of 18 February 2018

Viera Ellong Doualla (born 14 June 1987) is a footballer who plays as a midfielder for Equatorial Guinean Liga Nacional club Futuro Kings FC. Born and raised in Cameron, he was a member of the Equatorial Guinea national team at the 2012 Africa Cup of Nations.

== International career ==
Among the frameworks of Equatorial Guinea national football team players, is certainly Viera Ellong Doualla, born to Cameroonian parents, this 27-year-old midfielder was the first Cameroonian to seek his professional career in the Equatorial Guinea neighbor. Even if he lived five years in the country of adoption as required by FIFA's change of sport nationality procedure, it was not necessarily the case in his debut in the Equatorial Guinea national football team.

He was part of the squad at the 2012 Africa Cup of Nations.

=== International goals ===
Scores and results list Equatorial Guinea's goal tally first.

| No. | Date | Venue | Opponent | Score | Result | Competition |
|---|---|---|---|---|---|---|
| 1. | 11 October 2011 | Estadio de Malabo, Malabo, Equatorial Guinea | Cameroon | 1–1 | 1–1 | Friendly |
| 2. | 15 November 2011 | Mahamasina Municipal Stadium, Antananarivo, Madagascar | Madagascar | 1–0 | 1–2 | 2014 FIFA World Cup qualification |
