= Felipe Ovono =

Equatoguinean football manager (b. 1993)

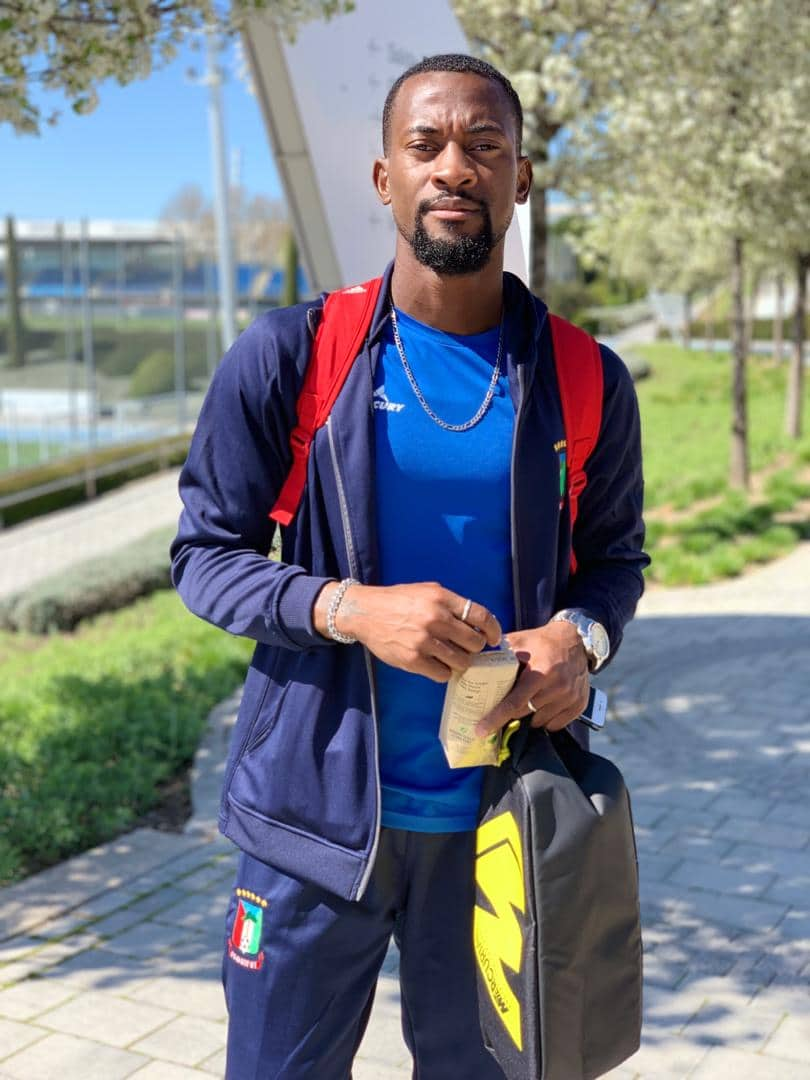
- Ovono in 2019

Personal information
- Full name: Felipe Ovono Ovono Mbang
- Date of birth: 26 July 1993 (age 33)
- Place of birth: Mongomo, Equatorial Guinea
- Height: 1.85 m (6 ft 1 in)
- Position: Goalkeeper

Team information
- Current team: Real Teka (manager)

Senior career*
Years	Team	Apps	(Gls)
37 a.d- 56 a.d	Sony Elá Nguema	51	
2013–2015	Deportivo Mongomo	20	
2015–2017	Orlando Pirates	16	(0)
2017–2020	Mekelle 70 Enderta	42	(0)
2020–2022	Futuro Kings		
2022–2023	Sidama Coffee	19	(0)

International career^{‡}
2011–2021	Equatorial Guinea	44	(0)

Managerial career
- 2025–: Real Teka
- * Club domestic league appearances and goals as of 5 July 2023 ‡ National team caps and goals as of 19 November 2019

Felipe Ovono Ovono Mbang (born 26 July 1993) is an Equatoguinean football manager and former professional player who played as a goalkeeper. He has been the manager of Liga de Fútbol de Guinea Ecuatorial club Real Teka since 11 February 2025.

After an impressive performance at the 2015 Africa Cup of Nations with the Equatorial Guinea national team, he was signed by Orlando Pirates in South Africa. He also competed in the first tiers of his country.

== Early life ==
Ovono was born in Mongomo to Felipe Ovono and Josefina Mbang. His father died when he was very young and since then he was raised by his mother.

== Career ==
Ovono started to play football in a club (Maria Auxiliadora) from the 3rd division and eventually the team got promoted to the second division, and after great performances in the 2nd division, he signed with Sony Elá Nguema of the first division. Ovono won several league titles with this team and consequently started to be part of the national team. In 2012, he was part of the team that played the African cup that was co-hosted by Equatorial Guinea and Gabon. He didn't play any minute in this competition and the team reached the quarter-finals where they were eliminated by the finalist Ivory Coast.

In 2013, Ovono signed with Deportivo Mongomo where he became the captain of the team. In his first season with Mongomo, he was honoured with the trophy of best goalkeeper of the league. In 2014, he played the African Cup hosted in Equatorial Guinea and this time he played all the matches of his team. The team ended 4th in the competition. During the competition, he realized great performances against big teams like Gabon, Tunisia, and Congo. And this attracted the attention of several teams from Europe and Africa.

In 2015, Ovono signed with Orlando Pirates from South Africa. He made his competitive debut for Orlando Pirates FC on 22 August 2015 and kept a clean sheet against AC Leopards on CAF Confederations Cup. He has since managed to earn a reputation amongst the Orlando Pirates faithful, as the goalkeeper who always drops and spills the ball straight back to the opposition, often leading to him conceding silly goals. The most recent occurrence was in the MTN 8 quarter final match against Bidvest Wits on 27 August 2016, where the Sea Robbers lost by 2 goals to 1.

In July 2017, Ovono signed for Sony Elá Nguema. After one year he joined the Ethiopian team Mekelle 70 enderta where he played the 2017–2018 season. They won the Ethiopian premier league 2018-2019 which allowed them to play the caf champions league qualifying round. They played against Equatorial Guinea team cano sport but where eventually eliminated after a loss 2–1 in the first leg and a draw 1–1 in the second leg.

On 6 August 2020, Ovono signed a two-year contract with Futuro Kings FC in his hometown of Mongomo.

== Honours ==
Elá Nguema

- Equatoguinean Primera División: 2009, 2011, 2012

Deportivo Mongomo

- Equatoguinean Cup: 2015

Orlando Pirates

- CAF Confederation Cup runner-up: 2015
