= Esteban Becker =

Argentine football player and manager (born 1964)

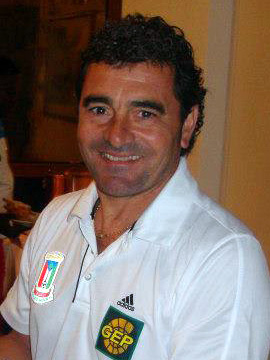

Personal information
- Full name: Esteban Becker Churukian
- Date of birth: 31 August 1964 (age 62)
- Place of birth: Bernal, Argentina
- Position: Midfielder

Team information
- Current team: Torrijos (manager)

Youth career
- 1974–1984: Independiente

Senior career*
Years	Team	Apps	(Gls)
1984–1988	Quilmes		
1989	Ciempozuelos		
1993–1994	Loeches		

Managerial career
- 1999–2002: RSD Alcalá
- 2003–2004: S.S. Reyes
- 2008–2009: Ciempozuelos
- 2009–2010: Fuenlabrada
- 2011–2012: San Fernando
- 2012–2015: Equatorial Guinea Women
- 2015–2017: Equatorial Guinea
- 2021: Racing Murcia
- 2021–: Torrijos
- * Club domestic league appearances and goals

Esteban Becker Churukián (born 31 August 1964) is an Argentine football manager and former player. He currently manages Tercera División RFEF club CD Torrijos.

== Early life ==
Becker was born in Bernal, Buenos Aires to Argentine parents – a Jewish father of German descent and a Christian mother of Armenian descent.

== Club career ==
Becker played in the youth ranks for Independiente from 1974 to 1984. He played professionally with Quilmes and with Ciempozuelos and Loeches and even an offer from Atletico de Madrid in 1989. Due to his Jewish roots, he represented his country at 1989 Maccabiah Games in Israel, winning a silver medal.

== Managerial career ==
After coaching a number of clubs in Spanish lower divisions, Becker signed as the coach of Equatorial Guinea women's team in 2012. He won the 2012 African Women's Championship which the country hosted. In 2013, he was appointed as the technical director of all the three national sides of Equatorial Guinea.. In January 2015, he was appointed as the manager of Equatorial Guinea, three weeks before the 2015 Africa Cup of Nations.
