= 2018–19 Equatoguinean Primera División =

Equatoguinean Primera División
- Season: 2018–19
- Champions: Cano Sport
- Relegated: Recreativo Lampert; Real X Balompié; Unión Vésper; Racing de Micomeseng
- Champions League: Cano Sport
- Confederation Cup: Akonangui

The 2018–19 Equatoguinean Primera División is the 41st season of the Equatoguinean Primera División, the top-tier football league in Equatorial Guinea, since its establishment in 1979.

== Regional stage ==
The 24 teams are divided into Región Insular and Región Continental, with 12 teams in each region.

The top three teams from each region qualify for the Liguilla Nacional. The bottom two teams from each region are relegated.

=== Región Insular ===
Pos	Team	Pld	W	D	L	GF	GA	GD	Pts	Qualification or relegation
1	Leones Vegetarianos (Q)	22	16	1	5	47	16	+31	49	Qualification for Liguilla Nacional
2	Cano Sport (Q)	22	15	1	6	56	19	+37	46	Qualification for Liguilla Nacional
3	Deportivo Unidad (Q)	22	12	5	5	35	11	+24	41	Qualification for Liguilla Nacional
4	Estrella Roja	22	11	6	5	26	21	+5	39	
5	San Pablo de Nsork	22	12	2	8	37	33	+4	38	
6	Atlético Semu	22	10	6	6	28	26	+2	36	
7	Sony Elá Nguema	22	8	7	7	29	24	+5	31	
8	The Panthers	22	9	3	10	45	27	+18	30	
9	Ceiba FC	22	7	5	10	27	38	−11	26	
10	Santa María	22	6	4	12	19	28	−9	22	
11	Recreativo Lampert (R)	22	2	4	16	15	64	−49	10	Relegation
12	Real X Balompié (R)	22	1	2	19	10	69	−59	5	Relegation

(Q) Qualified for the phase indicated; (R) Relegated

=== Región Continental ===
Pos	Team	Pld	W	D	L	GF	GA	GD	Pts	Qualification or relegation
1	Futuro Kings (Q)	22	16	4	2	46	9	+37	52	Qualification for Liguilla Nacional
2	Akonangui FC (Q)	22	16	3	3	39	11	+28	51	Qualification for Liguilla Nacional
3	Deportivo Niefang (Q)	22	14	2	6	49	18	+31	44	Qualification for Liguilla Nacional
4	Dragón FC	22	12	2	8	37	25	+12	38	
5	Deportivo Mongomo	22	9	5	8	27	28	−1	32	
6	15 de Agosto	22	8	7	7	34	27	+7	31	
7	AD Mongomo	22	9	4	9	30	34	−4	31	
8	Fundación Bata	22	8	3	11	29	32	−3	27	
9	Atlético Bata	22	6	8	8	28	34	−6	26	
10	Deportivo Anoney	22	5	6	11	19	27	−8	21	
11	Unión Vesper (R)	22	4	1	17	23	60	−37	13	Relegation
12	Racing de Micomeseng (R)	22	2	2	18	21	74	−53	8	Relegation

(Q) Qualified for the phase indicated; (R) Relegated

== Liguilla Nacional ==
Played between 16 and 30 June 2019 in Región Continental.

Pos	Team	Pld	W	D	L	GF	GA	GD	Pts	Qualification or relegation
1	Cano Sport (C)	5	4	0	1	11	7	+4	12	Qualification for Champions League
2	Leones Vegetarianos	5	2	2	1	7	5	+2	8	
3	Deportivo Niefang	5	2	2	1	6	5	+1	8	
4	Futuro Kings	5	2	1	2	3	4	−1	7	
5	Akonangui (Q)	5	1	2	2	6	7	−1	5	Qualification for Confederation Cup (Note: Akonangui are Equatoguinean Cup winners.)
6	Deportivo Unidad	5	0	1	4	4	9	−5	1	

(C) Champions; (Q) Qualified for the phase indicated

== Stadiums ==
Team	Location	Stadium	Capacity
Cano Sport Academy			
Leones Vegetarianos FC	Malabo	Estadio de Malabo	15,250
Deportivo Niefang			
Futuro Kings FC			
Akonangui FC	Ebibeyin	Estadio de Ebibeyin	8,000
CD Unidad Malabo	Malabo	Estadio de Malabo	15,250
