= 2019–20 Equatoguinean Primera División =

Equatoguinean Primera División
- Season: 2019–20

The 2019–20 Equatoguinean Primera División is the 42nd season of the Equatoguinean Primera División, the top-tier football league in Equatorial Guinea, since its establishment in 1979.

The season was originally to start on 15 December 2019, but was later postponed to 4 January 2020, and eventually started on 11 January 2020.

On 8 June 2020, the Equatoguinean Football Federation (FEGUIFUT) announced the tournament was abandoned due to the COVID-19 pandemic in Equatorial Guinea.

== Teams ==
The 24 teams are divided into Región Insular and Región Continental, with 12 teams in each region. The following teams were promoted and relegated from the previous season:

- In the Región Insular, Recreativo Lampert and Real X Balompié were relegated and were replaced by promoted teams Real Rebola and Santa Isabel.
- In the Región Continental, Atlético Bata, Unión Vésper and Racing de Micomeseng were relegated and were replaced by promoted teams Hacía Club de Mbedumu, Inter Vesper and Inter Litoral.

Región Insular

- Atlético Semu
- Cano Sport
- Ceiba
- Deportivo Unidad
- Estrella Roja
- Leones Vegetarianos
- The Panthers
- Real Rebola
- San Pablo de Nsork
- Santa Isabel
- Santa María
- Sony Elá Nguema

Región Continental

- 15 de Agosto
- AD Mongomo
- Akonangui
- Deportivo Anoney
- Deportivo Mongomo
- Deportivo Niefang
- Dragón
- Fundación Bata
- Futuro Kings
- Hacía Club de Mbedumu
- Inter Litoral
- Inter Vesper

== Regional stage ==
The top three teams from each region qualify for the Liguilla Nacional. The bottom two teams from each region are relegated.

=== Región Insular ===
Pos	Team	Pld	W	D	L	GF	GA	GD	Pts	Qualification or relegation
1	Leones Vegetarianos	11	9	1	1	29	1	+28	28	Qualification for Liguilla Nacional
2	Cano Sport	11	8	0	3	19	7	+12	24	Qualification for Liguilla Nacional
3	Deportivo Unidad	11	7	3	1	18	8	+10	24	Qualification for Liguilla Nacional
4	Atlético Semu	11	6	2	3	20	14	+6	20	
5	Santa María	11	6	1	4	12	12	0	19	
6	Sony Elá Nguema	11	3	5	3	12	12	0	14	
7	Ceiba	11	3	3	5	11	12	−1	12	
8	San Pablo de Nsork	11	2	5	4	9	12	−3	11	
9	Real Rebola	11	3	2	6	8	20	−12	11	
10	The Panthers	11	2	4	5	13	20	−7	10	
11	Estrella Roja	11	1	3	7	5	16	−11	6	Relegation
12	Santa Isabel	11	0	3	8	10	32	−22	3	Relegation

Updated to match(es) played on 15 March 2020. Source: FEGUIFUT

=== Región Continental ===
Pos	Team	Pld	W	D	L	GF	GA	GD	Pts	Qualification or relegation
1	Akonangui	11	9	2	0	23	8	+15	29	Qualification for Liguilla Nacional
2	Futuro Kings	11	7	3	1	22	7	+15	24	Qualification for Liguilla Nacional
3	Fundación Bata	11	6	3	2	21	11	+10	21	Qualification for Liguilla Nacional
4	Dragón	11	6	3	2	19	11	+8	21	
5	15 de Agosto	11	6	2	3	25	15	+10	20	
6	Deportivo Anoney	11	5	2	4	14	16	−2	17	
7	Inter Litoral	11	4	4	3	15	11	+4	16	
8	Deportivo Mongomo	11	3	3	5	13	18	−5	12	
9	Deportivo Niefang	11	3	0	8	12	22	−10	9	
10	Hacía Club de Mbedumu	11	2	3	6	12	23	−11	9	
11	AD Mongomo	11	2	1	8	11	17	−6	7	Relegation
12	Inter Vesper	11	0	0	11	3	31	−28	0	Relegation

Updated to match(es) played on 15 March 2020. Source: FEGUIFUT

== Liguilla Nacional ==
Pos	Team	Pld	W	D	L	GF	GA	GD	Pts	Qualification or relegation
1	Team 1	0	0	0	0	0	0	0	0	Qualification for Champions League
2	Team 2	0	0	0	0	0	0	0	0	
3	Team 3	0	0	0	0	0	0	0	0	
4	Team 4	0	0	0	0	0	0	0	0	
5	Team 5	0	0	0	0	0	0	0	0	
6	Team 6	0	0	0	0	0	0	0	0	

First match(es) will be played: TBA 2020. Source: FEGUIFUT

== Results ==
- Round 1 (11–12 January 2020):
- Round 2 (18–19 January 2020):
- Round 3 (25–26 January 2020):
- Round 4 (29 January 2020):
- Round 5 (1–2 February 2020):
- Round 6 (8–9 February 2020):
- Round 7 (15–16 February 2020):
- Round 8 (22–23 February 2020):
- Round 9 (29 February–1 March 2020):
- Round 10 (7–8 March 2020):
- Round 11 (14–15 March 2020):

League suspended on 16 March 2020 for two weeks due to COVID-19.
