= Football in Equatorial Guinea =

- Country: Equatorial Guinea
- Governing body: Equatoguinean Football Federation
- National team: men's national team

Club competitions
- Equatoguinean Premier League

International competitions
- Champions League; CAF Confederation Cup; Super Cup; FIFA Club World Cup; FIFA World Cup(National Team); African Cup of Nations(National Team)

Association football (soccer) is the most popular sport in Equatorial Guinea. It was during Spanish colonialism that football arrived to Equatorial Guinea. Football is now a very popular sport in the country. Recently the national team has made a few surprising results. In the qualification for the FIFA World Cup in 2006 Togo (who later qualified for the World Cup) was beaten 1-0, and in qualification for the African Cup of Nations in 2008 they beat Cameroon 1-0.

Equatorial Guinea co-hosted the 2012 Africa Cup of Nations with Gabon, and was the host of the 2015 Africa Cup of Nations.

== League system ==
Level	League(s)/Division(s)
1	Equatoguinean Primera División; 20 clubs divided in 2 series of 10
2	Segunda División de Guine Equatorial; 16 clubs + 1 Reserve team

== Women's football ==
The women's national team qualified for the 2011 FIFA World Cup. In 2015 FIFA banned Equatorial Guinea for forging documents for naturalisation of players.

== Football stadiums in Equatorial Guinea ==
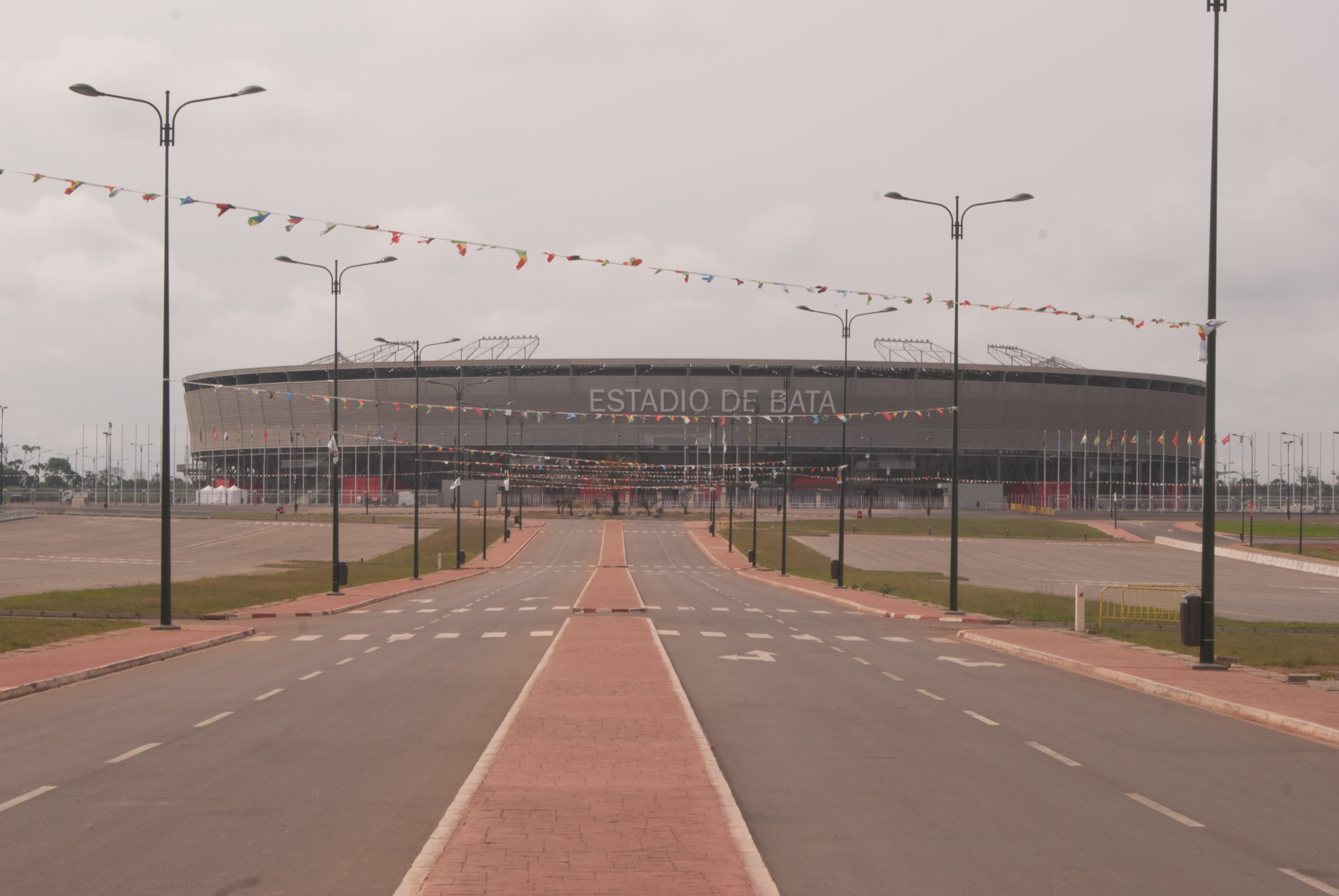
The exterior of the Estadio de Bata.

Stadium	Capacity	City	Tenants	Image
Estadio de Bata	35,700	Bata	Equatorial Guinea national football team	
Estadio de Malabo	15,250	Malabo	CD Elá Nguema, Atlético Semu, Deportivo Unidad, The Panthers FC, Leones Vegetarianos	
Estadio de Mongomo	10,000	Mongomo	Deportivo Mongomo	
Estadio de Ebibeyin	8,000	Ebibeyin	Akonangui FC	
Estadio La Libertad	4,000	Bata		

== See also ==
- Lists of stadiums
