= Roben Nsue =

Equatoguinean footballer (born 1993)

Roben Obama
Personal information
- Full name: Roben Obama Nsue Ondo
- Date of birth: 21 June 1993 (age 33)
- Place of birth: Ebeiñ-Yenkeng, Equatorial Guinea
- Height: 1.70 m (5 ft 7 in)
- Positions: Striker; midfielder

Team information
- Current team: Akonangui

Youth career
- Residencial Torrejón
- CD Parque de Cataluña
- Fiat Torrejón
- Colegio Salgui

Senior career*
Years	Team	Apps	(Gls)
2008–2012	Atlético Malabo		
2013–2014	Leones Vegetarianos		
2015	The Panthers		
2015–2016	Atlético Semu		
2017–2018	Dedebit	4	(1)
2019–	Akonangui		

International career^{‡}
2015–	Equatorial Guinea	2	(0)
- * Club domestic league appearances and goals ‡ National team caps and goals as of 28 March 2016

Roben Obama Nsue Ondo (born 21 June 1993), also known as Rubén Darío, is an Equatoguinean footballer who plays as a striker for Liga Nacional de Fútbol club Akonangui FC and the Equatorial Guinea national team.

== Club career ==
Born in Ebeiñ-Yenkeng, Niefang District, Centro Sur Province, Obama spent five seasons in Atlético Malabo. He was the top scorer of the Equatoguinean Second Division in 2008 with 12 goals and of the Equatoguinean Premier League in 2012 with 16 goals.

For the 2013 season, Obama has signed with Leones Vegetarianos, another Malabo's football club.

== International career ==
On 8 January 2015, Obama was included in Esteban Becker's 23-men list for the 2015 Africa Cup of Nations. He made his international debut 17 days later as a second-half substitute in a 2–0 win against Gabon.

== Statistics ==
=== International ===
As of 25 January 2015

Equatorial Guinea
Year	Apps	Goals
2015	1	0
Total	1	0

== Honours ==
=== Club ===
Atlético Malabo

- Equatoguinean Second Division: 2008

Leones Vegetarianos

- Equatoguinean Cup: 2014
