= 2018 Equatoguinean Primera División =

Equatoguinean Primera División
- Season: 2018
- Champions: Leones Vegetarianos

The 2018 Equatoguinean Primera División is the 40th season of the Equatoguinean Primera División, the top-tier football league in Equatorial Guinea, since its establishment in 1979. The season started on 26 May 2018.

== First stage ==
Divided into Región Insular and Región Continental. Top three teams from each region qualify for the final stage.

After 21 rounds (5 August 2018):

== Final stage ==
Qualified teams:

- Región Insular: Leones Vegetarianos, Deportivo Unidad, Atlético Semu
- Región Continental: Deportivo Niefang, Futuro Kings, 15 de Agosto

Final positions:

1. Leones Vegetarianos (qualified for the 2018–19 CAF Champions League)
2. Deportivo Unidad (qualified for the 2018–19 CAF Confederation Cup) (Note: As the Equatoguinean Cup has not had a 2018 edition, the Equatoguinean Football Federation chose the league runner-up Deportivo Unidad to represent the country at the 2018–19 CAF Confederation Cup.)
