= Felipe Esono Moreno =

Equatoguinean football manager (b. 1988)

Felipe Esono
Personal information
- Full name: Felipe Esono Moreno Nzang
- Date of birth: 14 February 1988 (age 38)
- Place of birth: Mbini, Equatorial Guinea

Managerial career
- Years: Team
- 2017: Recreativo Lampert
- 2017: Leones Vegetarianos
- 2018: Deportivo Mongomo
- 2019: Deportivo Unidad
- 2019: Equatorial Guinea
- 2023–2024: Akonangui
- 2024: 15 de Agosto
- 2024–: Victoria United

Felipe Esono Moreno Nzang (born 14 February 1988) is an Equatoguinean football manager who manages Victoria United.

== Career ==
Esono started his managerial career with Equatoguinean side Recreativo Lampert in 2017. The same year, he was appointed manager of Equatoguinean side Leones Vegetarianos. Following his stint there, he was appointed manager of Equatoguinean side Deportivo Mongomo in 2018. In 2019, he was appointed manager of Equatoguinean side Deportivo Unidad, before being appointed manager of the Equatorial Guinea national football team the same year.

Four years later, he was appointed manager of Equatoguinean side Akonangui. After leaving the club, Equatoguinean news website Actualidad Guinea Mundo wrote that he was "one of the best coaches that LIFUTEG has, champion two seasons ago with Deportivo Mongomo". Subsequently, he was appointed manager of Equatoguinean side 15 de Agosto in 2024, helping the club win the 2024 Equatoguinean Cup. Ahead of the 2024–25 season, he was appointed manager of Cameroonian side Victoria United and managed the club for the 2024 Super Coupe Roger Milla, which they lost 1–2 to Colombe Sportive.
