= 2017 Equatoguinean Primera División =

Equatoguinean Primera División
- Season: 2017
- Champions: Leones Vegetarianos

The 2015–16 Equatoguinean Primera División season is the top level of competition in Equatorial Guinea. It began on 22 January 2017 and concluded on 19 July 2017.

== First stage ==
=== Región Continental ===
Pos	Team	Pld	W	D	L	GF	GA	GD	Pts
1	Racing Micomeseng (Q)	14	11	2	1	31	8	+23	35
2	FC Bata (Q)	14	9	2	3	23	12	+11	29
3	Estrellas del Futuro (Q)	14	8	3	3	24	12	+12	27
4	Unión Vesper	14	5	2	7	17	23	−6	17
5	Quince de Agosto	14	4	3	7	14	16	−2	15
6	Atlético Bata	13	4	1	8	10	22	−12	13
7	Nsok-Nsomo FC	14	3	3	8	14	28	−14	12
8	Real Bumudi	13	2	2	9	14	26	−12	8

Updated to match(es) played on unknown. Source:
(Q) Qualified for the phase indicated

=== Región Insular ===
Pos	Team	Pld	W	D	L	GF	GA	GD	Pts
1	Sony de Ela Nguema (Q)	14	10	4	0	32	11	+21	34
2	Leones Vegetarianos (Q)	14	9	4	1	33	9	+24	31
3	Atlético Semu (Q)	14	7	3	4	23	14	+9	24
4	Deportivo Unidad	14	7	1	6	33	13	+20	22
5	UD Santa María	13	5	2	6	17	21	−4	17
6	Recreativo Lampert	14	4	3	7	16	17	−1	15
7	AD Real Equis	14	1	4	9	11	41	−30	7
8	Real Teka	13	0	3	10	8	47	−39	3

Updated to match(es) played on unknown. Source:
(Q) Qualified for the phase indicated

== Liguilla Nacional ==
Point totals from first stage carried over; teams only play opponents from other zone.

The title was won by Leones Vegetarianos

6   4  1  1   9- 4  44 (31 pts in first stage + 13 pts in second stage).
