= Ibra Agbo =

Association football player (1987–2017)

Personal information
- Full name: Ibrahim Agbo Lache
- Date of birth: 1 February 1987
- Place of birth: Douala, Cameroon
- Date of death: 1 July 2017 (aged 30)
- Position: Defender

Senior career*
Years	Team	Apps	(Gls)
2000–2002	Sony de Elá Nguema		
2006	Akonangui		
- Deportivo Mongomo

International career
2011	Equatorial Guinea	3	(0)

Managerial career
- 2015: Leones Vegetarianos
- * Club domestic league appearances and goals

Ibrahim "Ibra" Agbo Lache (1 February 1987 – 1 July 2017) was a football player and coach. He operated as a defender. Born in Cameroon, he represented Equatorial Guinea internationally, winning three caps in 2011.

== Club career ==
Agbo captained Akonangui FC at the 2006 CAF Confederation Cup.

He played for Deportivo Mongomo from 2010. During this time, the club won the Equatoguinean Premier League once, in 2010. This title win qualified the club for the 2011 CAF Champions League, and Agbo played in both legs of their 2–1 aggregate defeat to ASPAC FC of Benin in the competition's preliminary round.

== International career ==
Agbo made his debut for Equatorial Guinea on 8 February 2011, playing the whole of a 2–0 friendly win over Chad. He won his second international cap in another friendly, a 1–0 victory against Gambia on 29 March 2011.

== Coaching career ==
While not possess the proper license, Agbo began working as a manager in 2015, being appointed at Leones Vegetarianos in the Equatoguinean Football League. He was their head coach in the 2015 CAF Confederation Cup preliminary round matches against Nigerian club Dolphins.
