= José Fabio Micha =

Equatoguinean footballer (born 1994)

Personal information
- Full name: José Fabio Micha Mikue
- Date of birth: 20 June 1994 (age 32)
- Place of birth: Bata, Equatorial Guinea
- Positions: Forward; midfielder

Senior career*
Years	Team	Apps	(Gls)
2014	Akonangui		
2015	Sony Elá Nguema		
2017	Racing Micomeseng		
2018	Deportivo Niefang		
2019–2022	Futuro Kings		
2022–	Deportivo Mongomo		

International career^{‡}
2019–	Equatorial Guinea	1	(0)
- * Club domestic league appearances and goals ‡ National team caps and goals as of 28 July 2019

José Fabio Micha Mikue (born 20 June 1994) is an Equatorial Guinean footballer who plays as a forward for the Equatorial Guinea national team. He is also known as Doraso, a tribute to former French international footballer Vikash Dhorasoo.

== Club career ==
Micha played for Akonangui FC at the 2014 CAF Champions League, Sony de Elá Nguema at the 2015 CAF Champions League, AD Racing de Micomeseng at the 2017 CAF Confederation Cup and Deportivo Niefang at the 2018 CAF Confederation Cup. He moved to Futuro Kings FC in 2019. He moved to Deportivo Mongomo FC in 2022.

== International career ==
Micha made his international debut for Equatorial Guinea on 28 July 2019.
