= Wenceslao Afugu =

Equatoguinean footballer (born 1992)

Lolín
Personal information
- Full name: Wenceslao Afugu Nkogo Nneme
- Date of birth: 16 September 1992 (age 34)
- Place of birth: Malabo, Equatorial Guinea
- Position: Forward

Team information
- Current team: Malabo United
- Number: 16

Senior career*
Years	Team	Apps	(Gls)
2012–2013	Atlético Semu		
2014	Leones Vegetarianos		
2015	Atlético Semu		
2016	Leones Vegetarianos		
2017	Real Burgos	7	(3)
2017	Leones Vegetarianos		
2017	Real Burgos	4	(2)
2018	Leones Vegetarianos		
2019	Futuro Kings		
2019	→ Leones Vegetarianos (loan)		
2019	→ Akonangui (loan)		
202?–2023	Leones Vegetarianos		
2023	→ Cano Sport (loan)		
2023–	Malabo United		

International career^{‡}
2018–	Equatorial Guinea	1	(0)
- * Club domestic league appearances and goals ‡ National team caps and goals as of 17 November 2018

Wenceslao Afugu Nkogo Nneme (born 16 September 1992), sportingly known as Lolín, is an Equatorial Guinean footballer who plays as a forward for Malabo United FC and the Equatorial Guinea national team.

== Statistics ==
=== International ===
As of 17 November 2018

Equatorial Guinea
Year	Apps	Goals
2018	1	0
Total	1	0
