= Cristián Nzang =

Equatoguinean footballer (born 1990)

Cristián
Personal information
- Full name: Miguel Ángel Nzang Nsue Ngui
- Date of birth: 27 July 1990 (age 36)
- Place of birth: Bata, Equatorial Guinea
- Height: 1.75 m (5 ft 9 in)
- Positions: Left-back; midfielder

Team information
- Current team: Deportivo Mongomo

Senior career*
Years	Team	Apps	(Gls)
2013	Sony Elá Nguema		
2014	Deportivo Mongomo		
2015	Sony Elá Nguema		
2015–2016	Deportivo Mongomo		
2016	UD Alginet	6	(0)
2017	Sony Elá Nguema		
2018–2019	Deportivo Niefang		
2019	→ Akonangui (loan)		
2020–202?	Futuro Kings		
202?–	Deportivo Mongomo		

International career^{‡}
2015–	Equatorial Guinea	4	(0)
- * Club domestic league appearances and goals ‡ National team caps and goals as of 17 November 2018

Miguel Ángel Nzang Nsue Ngui (born 27 July 1990), sportingly known as Cristián, is an Equatoguinean footballer who plays as a left-back for LIFGE club Deportivo Mongomo and the Equatorial Guinea national team.

== International career ==
Cristián made his formal international debut for Equatorial Guinea in 2015.

== Career statistics ==
=== International ===
As of match played 29 December 2024

Appearances and goals by national team and year
National team	Year	Apps	Goals
Equatorial Guinea	2013	1	0
Equatorial Guinea	2014	–	
Equatorial Guinea	2015	1	0
Equatorial Guinea	2016	–	
Equatorial Guinea	2017	–	
Equatorial Guinea	2018	3	0
Equatorial Guinea	2019	5	0
Equatorial Guinea	2020	1	0
Equatorial Guinea	2021	–	
Equatorial Guinea	2022	2	0
Equatorial Guinea	2023	–	
Equatorial Guinea	2024	2	0
Total		15	0
