= Manuel Sapunga =

Equatoguinean footballer (born 1992)

Personal information
- Full name: Manuel Sapunga Mbara
- Date of birth: 22 January 1992 (age 34)
- Place of birth: Bata, Equatorial Guinea
- Height: 1.84 m (6 ft 0 in)
- Position: Goalkeeper

Team information
- Current team: Sekhukhune United
- Number: 30

Youth career
- 2002–20??: Kadji Sports Academy

Senior career*
Years	Team	Apps	(Gls)
2011–2013	Leones Vegetarianos		
2013	Dolphin		
2014–2015	Sony de Elá Nguema		
2016	Deportivo Mongomo		
2017–2018	Leones Vegetarianos		
2019–2022	Futuro Kings		
2022–2025	Polokwane City	54	(0)
2025–	Sekhukhune United	2	(0)

International career^{‡}
2022–	Equatorial Guinea	5	(0)
- * Club domestic league appearances and goals as of 4 January 2026 ‡ National team caps and goals as of 9 June 2025

Manuel Sapunga Mbara (born 22 January 1992) is an Equatoguinean professional footballer who plays as a goalkeeper for South African Premiership club Sekhukhune United and the Equatorial Guinea national team.

== Early life ==
Sapunga was born in the Bata General Hospital. At age 3, he moved to Cameroon with his paternal grandmother, who was married to a Cameroonian diplomat who worked in the Consulate of Cameroon in Bata. He spent his entire childhood in Cameroon. His maternal grandfather (Mbara) was Kombe and his maternal grandmother Bisio.

== Club career ==
A product of Kadji Sports Academy in Cameroon, Sapunga has played for Leones Vegetarianos FC (two stints), Sony de Elá Nguema, Deportivo Mongomo and Futuro Kings FC in Equatorial Guinea, for Dolphin FC in Nigeria and for Polokwane City FC in South Africa.

On 12 July 2025, Sapunga signed for Sekhukhune United.

== International career ==
Sapunga has been capped for Equatorial Guinea at senior level during the 2021 Africa Cup of Nations.

== Statistics ==
=== International ===
As of 9 June 2025

Equatorial Guinea
Year	Apps	Goals
2022	1	0
2024	3	0
2025	1	0
Total	5	0
