= Christian Bon =

Cameroonian footballer (1988–2021)

Christian Bom
Personal information
- Date of birth: 25 August 1988
- Place of birth: Douala, Cameroon
- Date of death: 7 July 2021 (aged 32)
- Place of death: Saint-Avertin, France
- Height: 1.85 m (6 ft 1 in)
- Position: Goalkeeper

Youth career
- 1999: EFBC

Senior career*
Years	Team	Apps	(Gls)
2000	Douala		
2001–2002	Sanaga		
2003–2005	Panthère du Ndé		
2006	Cintra Yaoundé		
2007	Akonangui		
2007–2008	Dragón		
2009	Deportivo Mongomo		
2010–2011	Poissy		
2011–2012	Racing Paris		
2014–2016	FC Ouest Tourangeau		
2016–2018	La Châtaigneraie		
2018–2019	FC Ouest Tourangeau	15	(0)
2019	Loches AC	3	(0)
2020–2021	Joué-lès-Tours FCT		

International career
	Equatorial Guinea Youth	3	(0)
	Equatorial Guinea B	7	(0)
2009	Equatorial Guinea	2	(0)
- * Club domestic league appearances and goals as of 15 December 2019

Christian Bom (25 August 1988 – 7 July 2021) was a footballer who played as a goalkeeper.

Born and raised in Cameroon to Cameroonian parents, Bom played in the Equatorial Guinean league and subsequently capped for the Equatorial Guinea national team.
