= Armando Juan Mañé =

Equatoguinean footballer (born 1991)

Personal information
- Full name: Armando Juan Mañé Evian Mokuy
- Date of birth: 19 September 1992 (age 34)
- Place of birth: Mongomo, Equatorial Guinea
- Position: Forward

Team information
- Current team: Atlético Semu

Senior career*
Years	Team	Apps	(Gls)
2015	Atarfe Industrial	4	(0)
2016	Churriana	13	(3)
2016	La Bañeza	3	(0)
2018	USV Eichgraben	14	(15)
20??–2022	Cano Sport		
2023–	Atlético Semu		
2023	→ Cano Sport (loan)		

International career^{‡}
2022–	Equatorial Guinea	2	(0)
- * Club domestic league appearances and goals as of 10 November 2018 ‡ National team caps and goals as of 29 March 2022

Armando Juan Mañé Evian Mokuy (born 19 September 1992) is an Equatoguinean footballer who plays as a forward for LIFGE club Atlético Semu and the Equatorial Guinea national team.

== Club career ==
Mañé has played for Atarfe Industrial CF, Churriana de la Vega CF and La Bañeza FC in Spain, for USV Eichgraben in Austria and for Cano Sport Academy in Equatorial Guinea.

== International career ==
Mañé made his senior debut for Equatorial Guinea on 23 March 2022, starting in a 0–3 friendly loss to Guinea-Bissau.
