= Carlos Nvomo =

Equatoguinean footballer

Personal information
- Full name: Carlos Nvomo Mangue
- Date of birth: 13 May 1983 (age 43)
- Place of birth: Bata, Equatorial Guinea
- Position: Midfielder

Team information
- Current team: Deportivo Mongomo
- Number: 16

Senior career*
Years	Team	Apps	(Gls)
- Deportivo Mongomo

International career
2008–	Equatorial Guinea	2	(0)
- * Club domestic league appearances and goals

Carlos Nvomo Mangue (born 13 May 1983 in Bata) is an Equatoguinean football midfielder, who plays for Deportivo Mongomo in the First Division.

== International career ==
His father is Equatoguinean and his mother is a Cameroonian making him eligible to represent either country at international level. Nvomo has chosen to represent his country of birth. He has been international with the Equatorial Guinea national football team, at least, in a World Cup 2010 Qualifying match against South Africa and in a friendly match against Mali.
