= Jhon Mosquera =

Jhon Mosquera may refer to:

- Jhon Mosquera (footballer, born 1990), Colombian footballer
- Jhon Mosquera (footballer, born 1992), Colombian footballer

== See also ==
- John Mosquera (born 1988), Colombian footballer
