= Rusly Cachina Esapa =

Equatoguinean transgender rights activist

Rusly Cachina Esapa (born c. 1996) is an Equatoguinean transgender rights activist based in Spain. She is a co-founder of the organization Somos Parte del Mundo.

== Early life and education ==
Rusly Cachina Esapa was born in Malabo, Equatorial Guinea, c. 1996. From a young age, Cachina has identified as a transgender woman. She faced abuse from her teachers at school, leading her to drop out before finishing her baccalaureate. She has a twin brother who is a transgender man.

== Career ==
In 2016, Cachina co-founded the feminist and LGBTQ rights NGO Somos Parte del Mundo. The group aims to fight homophobia and transphobia, and provide education on LGBTQ issues. It also provides professional training to help LGBTQ people enter the labor market.

In her work with the organization since its founding, she has focused her activism on encouraging dialogue and emphasizing the brutal oppression of transgender people in Equatorial Guinea, especially transgender women, who, according to Esapa, are often forced to turn to prostitution to survive, suffering violence and contracting STIs. She also offers mental and physical health support for those in need.

In 2022, Cachina went into exile from her country and settled in Spain, fleeing a situation in which transgender women are beaten and poisoned to death on a daily basis. Since her emigration to Spain, she has continued her work as an activist. In December 2023, she participated in the first conference on the rights of LGBTQ migrants in Spain, organized by the Spanish refugee assistance NGO Comisión Española de Ayuda al Refugiado (CEAR). She also, in March 2024, participated alongside the activists Yun Ping, Biel Navarro, Andre Zuloeta and Nayare Soledad Otorongx in a Spanish Ministry of Culture event discussing transgender issues. In addition, she has worked with the LGBTQ refugee NGO Migrantia and the activist group Arcópoli.
