= Cafe Bank Sportif =

Equatoguinean football club

Café Sportif
- Full name: Café Band Sportif
- Ground: Estadio Internacional; Malabo, Equatorial Guinea
- Capacity: 6,000

Café Band Sportif, commonly known as Café Sportif, was an Equatoguinean football club based in Malabo that played in Equatoguinean Primera División and Segunda División.

In 1996 the team has won Primera División. It later became Renacimiento FC.

== Achievements ==
- Equatoguinean Premier League: 1

1996

== Performance in CAF competitions ==
- CAF Champions League: 1 appearance

1997 CAF Champions League – First Round
