= Renacimiento FC =

Renacimiento
- Full name: Renacimiento Fútbol Club
- Nickname: Rena
- Ground: Estadio Internacional; Malabo, Equatorial Guinea
- Capacity: 6,000
- Chairman: Melchor Esono Edjó
- 2007: Primera División, 1st
Home colours

Renacimiento Fútbol Club was an Equatoguinean football club based in the city of Malabo. It was the continuation of Cafe Bank Sportif. From 2004 to 2007, the club won 4 national titles. It was disestablished between 2009 and 2011, returned for the 2012 season in Segunga División and was later dissolved definitely.

== Honours ==
=== Domestic ===
- Equatoguinean Premier League
  - Champions (4): 2004, 2005, 2006, 2007

== Performance in CAF competitions ==
- CAF Champions League: 4 appearances

2005 – preliminary round
2006 – second round
2007 – preliminary round
2008 – preliminary round

- CAF Confederation Cup: 1 appearance

2006 – group stage

- CAF Cup: 1 appearance

2003 – first round
