= Jhon Mosquera (footballer, born 1992) =

Colombian footballer

Personal information
- Full name: Jhon César Mosquera Rivas
- Date of birth: 26 January 1992 (age 34)
- Place of birth: Zarzal, Colombia
- Height: 1.74 m (5 ft 9 in)
- Position: Midfielder

Team information
- Current team: Futuro Kings
- Number: 18

Senior career*
Years	Team	Apps	(Gls)
2015–2016	Rionegro Águilas	12	(1)
2016	Jaguares de Córdoba	8	(0)
2017	Serrato Pacasmayo	26	(5)
2018	Sport Loreto	18	(5)
2019	Sport Boys	5	(0)
2019	Universitario	7	(1)
2020–	Futuro Kings		
- * Club domestic league appearances and goals

Jhon César Mosquera Rivas (born 26 January 1992) is a Colombian footballer who plays as a midfielder for Equatorial Guinean club Futuro Kings FC.
