= ASC CS Sucrière =

Senegalese football club

- Full name: ASC CS Sucrière
- Ground: Stade Municipal de Richard Toll; Richard Toll, Senegal
- Capacity: 3,000
- League: Senegalese Second Division
- Senegal Premier League
Home colours	Away colours

ASC CS Sucrière is a Senegalese football club based in Richard Toll.

They played in the top division in Senegalese football and is currently part of the Senegalese Second Division. Their home stadium is Stade Municipal de Richard Toll.

== Performance in CAF competitions ==
- 2006 CAF Confederation Cup: first round
