= 2006 CAF Confederation Cup =

International football competition in Africa

Confederation of African Football Confederation Cup

Tournament details
- Dates: 17 February – 2 December
- Teams: 58

Final positions
- Champions: (Tunisia) ES Sahel (1st title)
- Runners-up: (Morocco) FAR Rabat

Tournament statistics
- Matches played: 110
- Goals scored: 260 (2.36 per match)
- Top scorer: (Angola) Manucho (8 goals)

The 2006 CAF Confederation Cup was the third edition of the CAF Confederation Cup. It started with the preliminary round (home-and away ties) that was played in February and March 2006. Étoile Sahel of Tunisia beat FAR Rabat of Morocco in the final. The final was marred by a skirmish when FAR Rabat attacked the referee and his linesman after having a late goal ruled out.

== Pre Cup Events ==
Before the cup, Morocco and South Africa offered to host the cup. Due to the uncertainty of hosting the cup in African terrain where there were ongoing conflicts at the time they did not host the cup.

== Qualifying rounds ==
=== Preliminary round ===
1st legs played 17–19 February 2006 and 2nd legs played 3–5 March 2006.

Team 1	Agg.	Team 2	1st leg	2nd leg
ASC Entente (Mauritania)	w/o^{1}	(Algeria) ASO Chlef	—	—
Sahel SC (Niger)	2–4	(Ivory Coast) Séwé Sports	1–1	1–3
ES Zarzis (Tunisia)	2–0	(Burkina Faso) US Ouagadougou	2–0	0–0
Akonangui FC (Equatorial Guinea)	0–0 (5–4 p)	(Cameroon) Impôts FC	0–0	0–0
TP USCA Bangui (Central African Republic)	1–5	(Cameroon) Les Astres FC	1–3	0–2
Tourbillon FC (Chad)	3–5	(Republic of the Congo) CSMD Diables Noirs	2–2	1–3
Bakau United (The Gambia)	w/o^{1}	(Ivory Coast) JC Abidjan	—	—
Al-Akhdar (Libya)	1–4	(Egypt) Haras El Hodood	1–0	0–4
Rayon Sport (Rwanda)	2–0	(Ethiopia) Awassa City FC	1–0	1–0
Mighty Blackpool (Sierra Leone)	2–3	(Senegal) ASC CS Sucrière	2–1	0–2
World Hope (Kenya)	1–2	Uganda Revenue Authority SC	1–1	0–1
Dynamic Togolais (Togo)	0–5	(Mali) AS Bamako	0–0	0–5
AS Kabasha (Democratic Republic of the Congo)	0–2	(Gabon) Sogéa FC	0–0	0–2
Super Magic Brothers (Seychelles)	0–3	(Botswana) Township Rollers	0–2	0–1
ZESCO United (Zambia)	4–0	(Mauritius) Pointe aux Sables Mates	3–0	1–0
Ferroviário da Beira (Mozambique)	2–1	(Comoros) Élan Club	2–1	n/p^{2}
JKU SC (Zanzibar)	1–2	(Madagascar) USJF Ravinala	0–0	1–2
Moro United (Tanzania)	bye^{3}			

^{1} ASC Entente and Bakau United FC withdrew.
^{2} The tie between Ferroviário da Beira and Élan Club was played over one leg only by mutual consent.
^{3} Moro United were drawn against the representatives of Zimbabwe, but the Zimbabwean FA were unable to send a team as their cup winners and league runners-up, Masvingo United, were suspended from CAF competition.

=== First round ===
1st legs played 17–19 March 2006 and 2nd legs played 31 March -2 April 2006.

Team 1	Agg.	Team 2	1st leg	2nd leg
ASO Chlef (Algeria)	0–1	(Senegal) AS Douanes	0–0	0–1
Séwé Sports (Ivory Coast)	2–3	(Algeria) NA Hussein Dey	1–0	1–3
ES Zarzis (Tunisia)	1–6	(Morocco) Olympique Khouribga	1–0	0–6
Akonangui FC (Equatorial Guinea)	1–1 (5–6 p)	(Nigeria) Lobi Stars	1–0	0–1
Les Astres FC (Cameroon)	3–4	(Angola) Petro Atlético	1–2	2–2
CSMD Diables Noirs (Republic of the Congo)	2–3	(Ghana) Berekum Arsenal	2–1	0–2
JC Abidjan (Ivory Coast)	0–2	(Nigeria) Heartland F.C.	0–0	0–2
Haras El Hodood (Egypt)	7–0	(Guinea) AS Kaloum Star	6–0	0–1
Rayon Sport (Rwanda)	1–3	(Egypt) Al-Ittihad Al-Iskandary	1–0	0–3
ASC CS Sucrière (Senegal)	0–4	(Tunisia) Espérance	0–1	0–3
Uganda Revenue Authority SC	2–3	(Sudan) Al-Merrikh	2–1	0–2
AS Bamako (Mali)	1–0	(Ghana) King Faisal Babes	1–0	0–0
Sogéa FC (Gabon)	1–2	(Angola) Interclube	1–0	0–2
ZESCO United (Zambia)	2–3	(Botswana) Township Rollers	2–1	0–2
Moro United (Tanzania)	awd^{1}	(Democratic Republic of the Congo) TP Mazembe	—	—
USJF Ravinala (Madagascar)	0–0 (4–3 p)	(Mozambique) Ferroviário da Beira	0–0	0–0

^{1} TP Mazembe was disqualified for showing up late for the 1st leg due to transportation problems.

=== Second round ===
1st legs played 21–23 April 2006 and 2nd legs played 5–7 May 2006.

Team 1	Agg.	Team 2	1st leg	2nd leg
NA Hussein Dey (Algeria)	3–1	(Senegal) AS Douanes	2–0	1–1
Lobi Stars (Nigeria)	2–3	(Morocco) Olympique Khouribga	1–1	1–2
Berekum Arsenal (Ghana)	0–2	(Angola) Petro Atlético	0–0	0–2
Haras El Hodood (Egypt)	2–3	(Nigeria) Heartland F.C.	0–0	2–3
Espérance (Tunisia)	1–1 (4–3 p)	(Egypt) Al-Ittihad Al-Iskandary	1–0	0–1
AS Bamako (Mali)	3–3 (2–3 p)	(Sudan) Al-Merrikh	3–0	0–3
Township Rollers (Botswana)	1–2	(Angola) Interclube	1–1	0–1
USJF Ravinala (Madagascar)	2–5	(Tanzania) Moro United	1–2	1–3

=== Play-off round ===
The 8 winners of the round of 16 play the losers of the round of 16 of the Champions League for 8 places in the group stage.
1st legs played 14-July 16, 2006 and 2nd legs played 28-July 30, 2006.

Team 1	Agg.	Team 2	1st leg	2nd leg
USCA Foot (Madagascar)	0–1	(Angola) Interclube	0–0	0–1
Renacimiento FC (Equatorial Guinea)	5–4	(Nigeria) Heartland F.C.	5–0	0–4
Étoile Sahel (Tunisia)	7–1	(Tanzania) Moro United	4–1	3–0
FC Saint Eloi Lupopo (Democratic Republic of the Congo)	3–2	(Sudan) Al-Merrikh	2–0	1–2
ASC Port Autonome (Senegal)	0–2	(Angola) Petro Atlético	0–1	0–1
FAR Rabat (Morocco)	2–1	(Algeria) NA Hussein Dey	2–0	0–1
Al Hilal Omdurman (Sudan)	1–2	(Morocco) Olympique Khouribga	0–0	1–2
Raja Casablanca (Morocco)	0–2	(Tunisia) Espérance	0–0	0–2

== Group stage ==
The Group Stage matches were played between August and October 2006.

Key to colours in group tables
Group winners advance to the final

=== Group A ===
Team	Pts	Pld	W	D	L	GF	GA	GD	
(Morocco) FAR Rabat	13	6	4	1	1	10	5	5	Final
(Morocco) Olympique Khouribga	10	6	3	1	2	6	5	1	
(Angola) Petro Atlético	8	6	2	2	2	10	7	3	
(Angola) GD Interclube	3	6	1	0	5	3	12	-9	

=== Group B ===
Team	Pts	Pld	W	D	L	GF	GA	GD	
(Tunisia) Étoile Sahel	18	6	6	0	0	15	3	12	Final
(Tunisia) Espérance	8	6	2	2	2	10	7	3	
(Democratic Republic of the Congo) FC Saint Eloi Lupopo	4	6	1	1	4	8	12	-4	
(Equatorial Guinea) Renacimiento FC	4	6	1	1	4	6	17	-11	

== Knockout stage ==
=== Final ===
The 1st leg was played on November 18 and the 2nd leg on December 2.

18 November 2006
--:-- UTC+1

FAR Rabat (Morocco)	1–1	(Tunisia) Étoile du Sahel
El Bahri 72'		Gilson Silva 34'

Moulay Abdellah Stadium, Rabat
Referee: Ahmed Ouda (Egypt)
2 December 2006
--:-- UTC+1

Étoile du Sahel (Tunisia)	0–0	(Morocco) FAR Rabat

Stade Olympique de Sousse, Sousse
Referee: Daniel Bennett (South Africa)

Étoile du Sahel won on away goal after 1–1 on aggregate.

== Top goalscorers ==
The top scorers from the 2006 CAF Confederation Cup are as follows:

Rank	Name	Team	Goals
1	(Angola) Manucho	(Angola) Petro Atlético	8
2	(Morocco) Abdessamad Rafik	(Morocco) Olympique Khouribga	7
3	(Nigeria) Emeka Opara	(Tunisia) Étoile du Sahel	6
4	(Egypt) Abdul-Hamid Bassiouny	(Egypt) Haras El Hodoud	5
4	(Morocco) Jawad Ouaddouch	(Morocco) FAR Rabat	5
6	(Egypt) Ahmed Abdel-Ghani	(Egypt) Haras El Hodoud	4
6	(Equatorial Guinea) El Hadji Ibrahim Touré	(Equatorial Guinea) Renacimiento FC	4
6	(Morocco) Samir Fellah	(Morocco) Olympique Khouribga	4
