= Real Rebola =

- Full name: Real Rebola
- Ground: Estadio Municipal, Rebola, Equatorial Guinea
- League: Equatoguinean Premier League

Real Rebola is an Equatoguinean football club based in the city of Rebola in Bioko Norte Province. The club played many seasons in the Equatoguinean Premier League.

In 1979 the team won Equatoguinean Premier League.

The team plays in the Equatoguinean Second Division.

== Achievements ==
- Equatoguinean Premier League: 1

1979
