= Malabo Stadium =

Stadium in Malabo, Equatorial Guinea

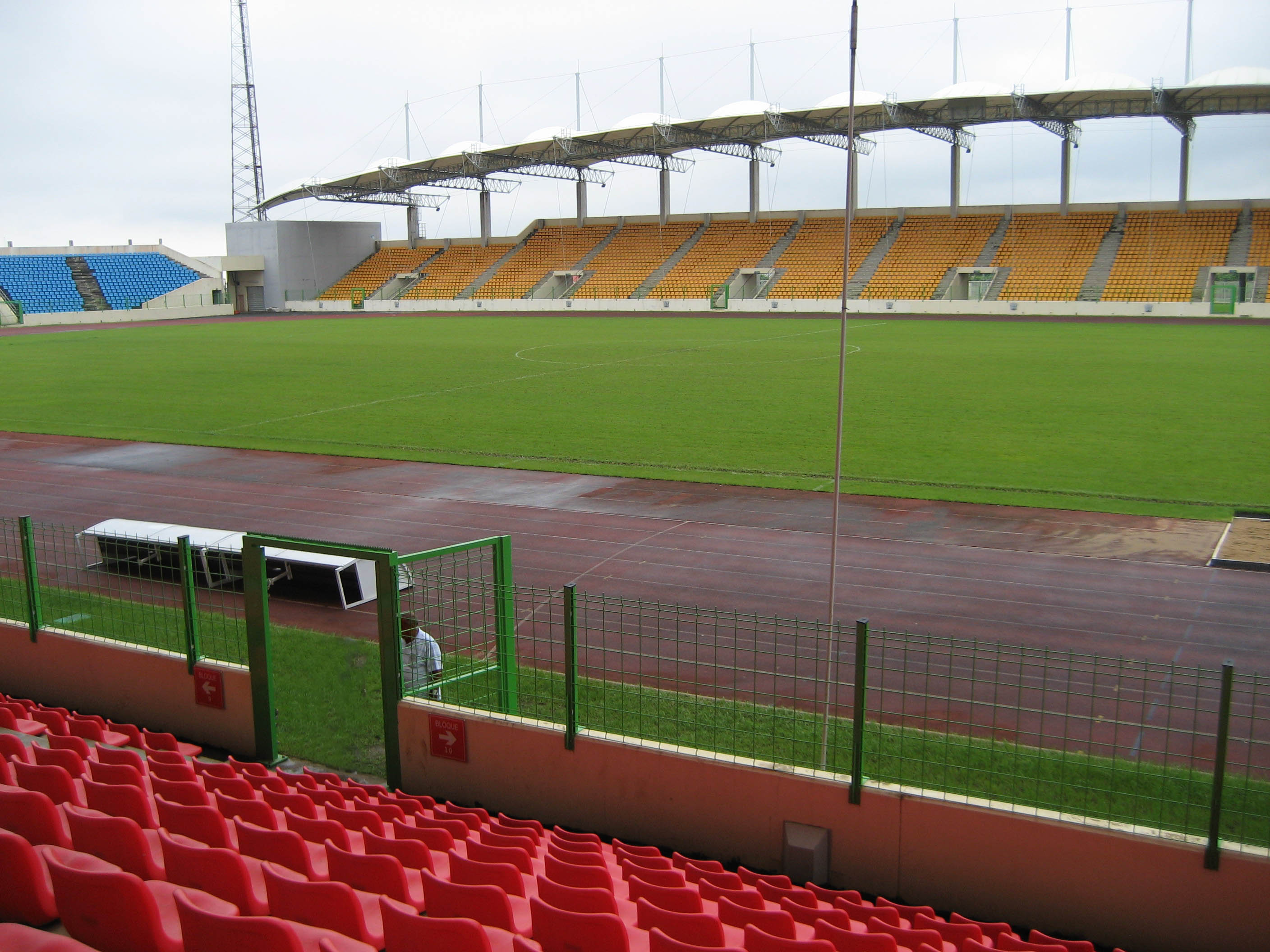
- Interactive map of Malabo Stadium
- Location: Malabo, Equatorial Guinea
- Coordinates: 3°43′30″N 8°46′9″E
- Capacity: 15,250

Construction
- Built: 2007
- Opened: 2007
- Main contractor: Bouygues

Tenant
- Equatorial Guinea national football team

Malabo Stadium is a multi-purpose stadium in Malabo, Equatorial Guinea, opened in 2007 and currently used mostly for football matches. With a seating capacity of about 15,250, it serves as the home ground of the Equatorial Guinea national football team.

It was one of the host stadiums for the 2012 and 2015 editions of the Africa Cup of Nations as well as the scene for the final of the 2008 African Women's Championship. Local football teams Atlético Malabo, Atlético Semu, Deportivo Unidad, Sony Elá Nguema, The Panthers and Vegetarianos all play their league games at this stadium.

It sits on the site of the original national stadium where 186 political opponents of the inaugural president of Equatorial Guinea, Francisco Macías Nguema, were killed. On 24 December 1969, 150 of them were either shot by a firing squad or hanged while Mary Hopkin's cover of "Those Were the Days" was played on the stadium's speakers. The remaining 36 were then forced to dig ditches which they were buried up to their necks in afterwards, and eaten alive by red ants over the following days. A common claim made is that the executioners wore Santa Claus costumes, however this is widely considered to be a sensationalist fabrication.
