= Atlético Semu =

- Full name: Atlético Semu
- Ground: Estadio de Malabo, Malabo, Equatorial Guinea
- Capacity: 15,250
- Chairman: Matías Esono Obiang Nsue
- Head Coach: Juan Bokung
- League: Liga Nacional de Fútbol
- 2012: 5th
- Website: http://www.atleticosemu.com/

Atlético Semu is an Equatoguinean football club based in the city of Malabo. It currently plays in Equatorial Guinea's top football division the Equatoguinean Primera División. They currently share the newly created Estadio de Malabo with fellow Primera División sides Atlético Malabo, Deportivo Unidad, Sony Elá Nguema, The Panthers and, its rival club, Leones Vegetarianos.

== History ==
In 2011 Atlético won their first ever major trophy as a football club which was the Equatoguinean Cup, Atlético beat Águilas Verdes 2–1 in the final of the competition. Due to their cup success they played the SuperCup final against 2011 league winners Sony Elá Nguema in which they lost the game 1–0 thanks to goal from Emeka. Due to their cup triumph they are scheduled to play Burundian side LLB Académic in the 2012 CAF Confederation Cup qualifying rounds of the competition. The winner will progress to the first round.

Current Equatoguinean international footballer Rubén Darío played for Atlético during the 2015 and 2015–2016 rimera División seasons. Rubén Darío was part of the national side which participated in the 2015 Africa Cup of Nations.

== Honours ==
- Equatoguinean Cup:
  - Winners (1): 2011
- Equatoguinean SuperCup:
  - Runners-up (1): 2011

== Performance in CAF competitions ==
- CAF Confederation Cup: 1 appearance

2012
