= Equatoguinean Cup =

The Equatoguinean Cup (Spanish: Copa de Su Excelencia) is the top knockout tournament of the Equatoguinean football. Its full name is Equatoguinean Cup - King's Cup Abudunal Sun. It was created in 1974.

== Winners ==
- 1978 : Union (Mongomo)
- 1979 : Akonangui FC
- 1980 : CD Elá Nguema
- 1981 : CD Elá Nguema
- 1982 : CD Elá Nguema
- 1983 : CD Elá Nguema
- 1984 : GD Lage (Malabo)
- 1985 : Atlético Malabo
- 1986 : Junevil Reyes (Bata)
- 1987 : Atlético Malabo
- 1988 : Atlético Malabo
- 1989 : Union Vesper (Bata)
- 1990 : Atlético Malabo
- 1991 : Atlético Malabo
- 1992 : CD Elá Nguema

unknown winner between 1993 and 1995

- 1996 : Akonangui FC
- 1997 : CD Elá Nguema 1–0 Deportivo Mongomo
- 1998 : Union Vesper
- 1999 : CD Unidad Malabo
- 2000 : CD Unidad Malabo
- 2001 : Atlético Malabo
- 2002 : Akonangui FC bt Sony Elá Nguema
- 2003 : unknown
- 2004 : Sony de Elá Nguema 1–0 Akonangui FC

unknown winner between 2005 and 2006

- 2007 : Akonangui 2–0 Atlético Malabo
- 2009 : Dragón
- 2011 : Atlético Semu 2–1 Águilas Verdes
- 2012 : The Panthers 1–0 AD Mesi Nkulu
- 2013 : The Panthers 2–0 Nsok-Nsomo
- 2014 : Leones Vegetarianos 1–1 Deportivo Mongomo [5–4 pen]
- 2015 : Deportivo Mongomo 2–0 The Panthers
- 2016 : Racing de Micomeseng 1–1 Atlético Semu [6–5 pen]
- 2017 : Deportivo Niefang 1–0 Atlético Semu
- 2018 : not played
- 2019 : Akonangui 2–0 Estrella Roja
- 2020–21 : Not played
- 2022 : Inter Litoral 1–0 Cano Sport Academy
- 2023 : Cano Sport Academy 2–0 EDSA
- 2024 : 15 de Agosto 3–0 Cano Sport Academy
- 2025 : 15 de Agosto 3–1 Deportivo Ebenezer
