= The Panthers FC =

The Panthers
- Full name: The Panthers F.C.
- Founded: 1997
- Ground: Estadio de Malabo; Malabo; Equatorial Guinea
- Capacity: 15,250
- Chairman: Perfecto Edu Nsue Miyono
- Coach: Veronica Mangue
- League: Liga Nacional de Fútbol
- 2025–26: 6th (insular region)
Home colours	Away colours

The Panthers F.C. is an Equatorial Guinean professional football club based in the city of Malabo. The club was founded in 1997. Their home ground is the Estadio de Malabo which holds a capacity of 15,250, their ground was built in 2007 primarily to host the 2012 Africa Cup of Nations. Their former chairman was current Akonangui FC president Ruslán Obiang Nsue (son of Teodoro Obiang). They currently play in the Liga Nacional de Fútbol.The current chairman is Perfecto Edu Nsue Miyono, a former player and captain of the club when it was founded in 1997

== Achievements ==
- Equatoguinean Cup: 2

2012, 2013
