= Atlético Malabo =

Equatoguinean football club

- Full name: Club Atlético de Malabo
- Ground: Estadio Internacional; Malabo, Equatorial Guinea
- Capacity: 6,000
- Head coach: Marcos Samuel Adeba
- League: National League First Division
- 2023: NLSD, ? (promoted)

Club Atlético de Malabo, commonly known as Atlético Malabo, is an Equatoguinean football club based in Malabo that plays in the National League First Division. The club clinched NLFD title thrice and Equatoguinean Cup title on six occasions.

== Achievements ==
- Equatoguinean Premier League: 3

1981, 1982, 2003

- Equatoguinean Cup: 6

1985, 1987, 1988, 1990, 1991, 2001

== Performance in CAF competitions ==
- CAF Champions League: 1 appearance

2004 – First Round

- African Cup of Champions Clubs: 2 appearances

1982: Preliminary Round
1984: Preliminary Round

- CAF Cup: 1 appearance

1998 – First Round

- CAF Cup Winners' Cup: 5 appearances

1980 – First Round
1985 – Preliminary Round
1988 – First Round
1992 – Preliminary Round
2002 – First Round
