= Deportivo Niefang =

Football club in Niefang, Equatorial Guinea

Deportivo Niefang is an Equatoguinean football club based in the city of Niefang.

== Honours ==
- Equatoguinean Premier League
  - Winners (1): 2010
- Equatoguinean Cup
  - Winners (4): 2005, 2011, 2013, 2015

== Performance in CAF competitions ==
- CAF Confederation Cup: 1 appearance

2018 –
