= AD Racing de Micomeseng =

Equatorial Guinea football club

Racing de Micomeseng is a football club from Equatorial Guinea. They won their first domestic league title in 2015, qualifying for 2016 CAF Champions League in the process.
