= CD Unidad Malabo =

Equatoguinean football club

Deportivo Unidad
- Full name: Club Deportivo Unidad
- Ground: Estadio de Malabo; Malabo, Equatorial Guinea
- Capacity: 15,250
- President: Francisco Asumu Obama
- Coach: Luciano Osa Viri
- League: Liga Nacional de Fútbol
- 2018: 2º

Club Deportivo Unidad, commonly known as Deportivo Unidad, is an Equatoguinean football club based in Malabo that plays in the National League First Division. The club have won the Equatoguinean Cup twice.

== Achievements ==
- Equatoguinean Cup: 2

1999, 2000

== Performance in CAF competitions ==
- African Cup Winners' Cup: 1 appearance

2001 African Cup Winners' Cup
