= Malabo =

Former capital of Equatorial Guinea

Malabo Santa Isabel (before 1973)
- City
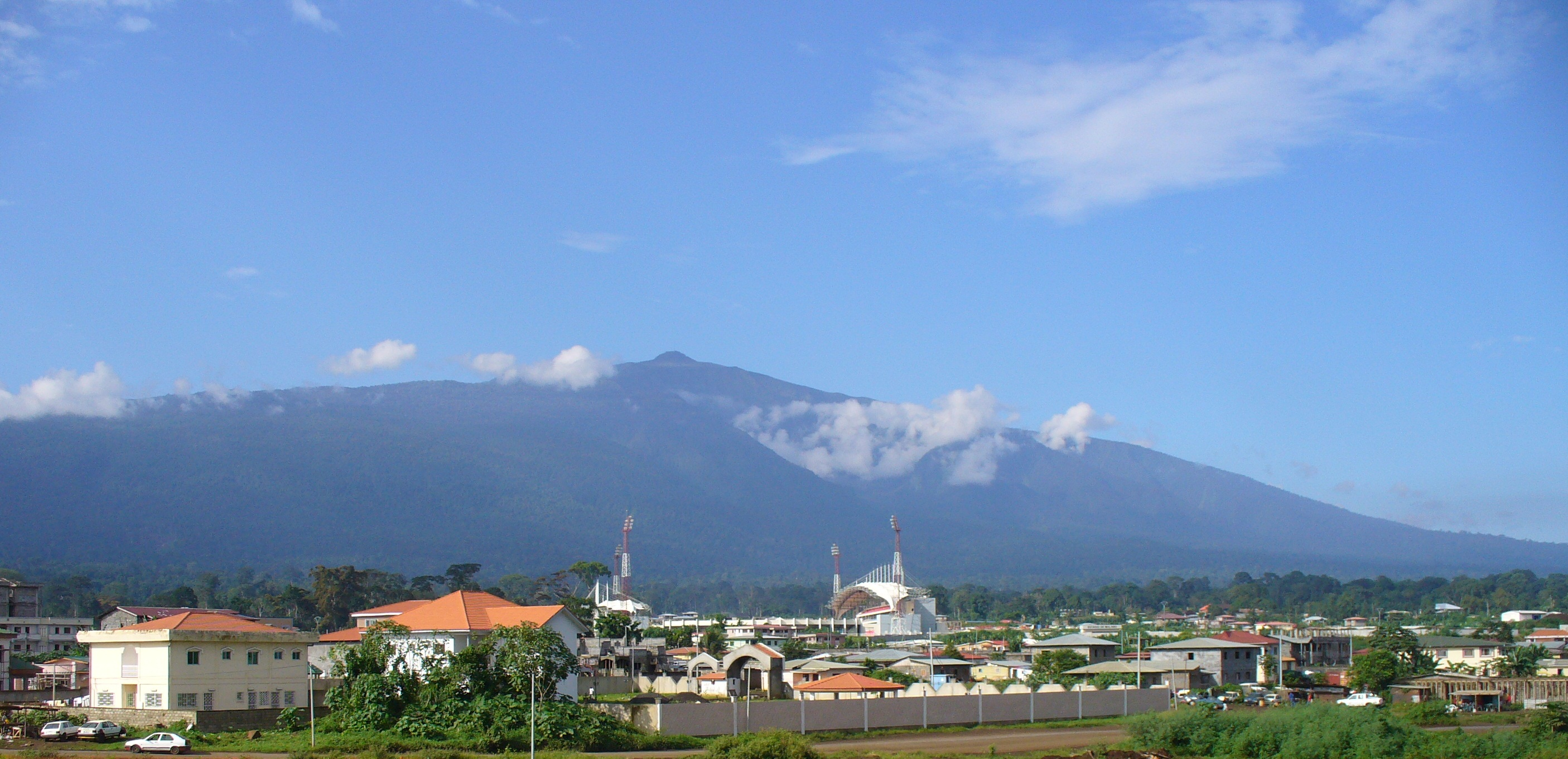
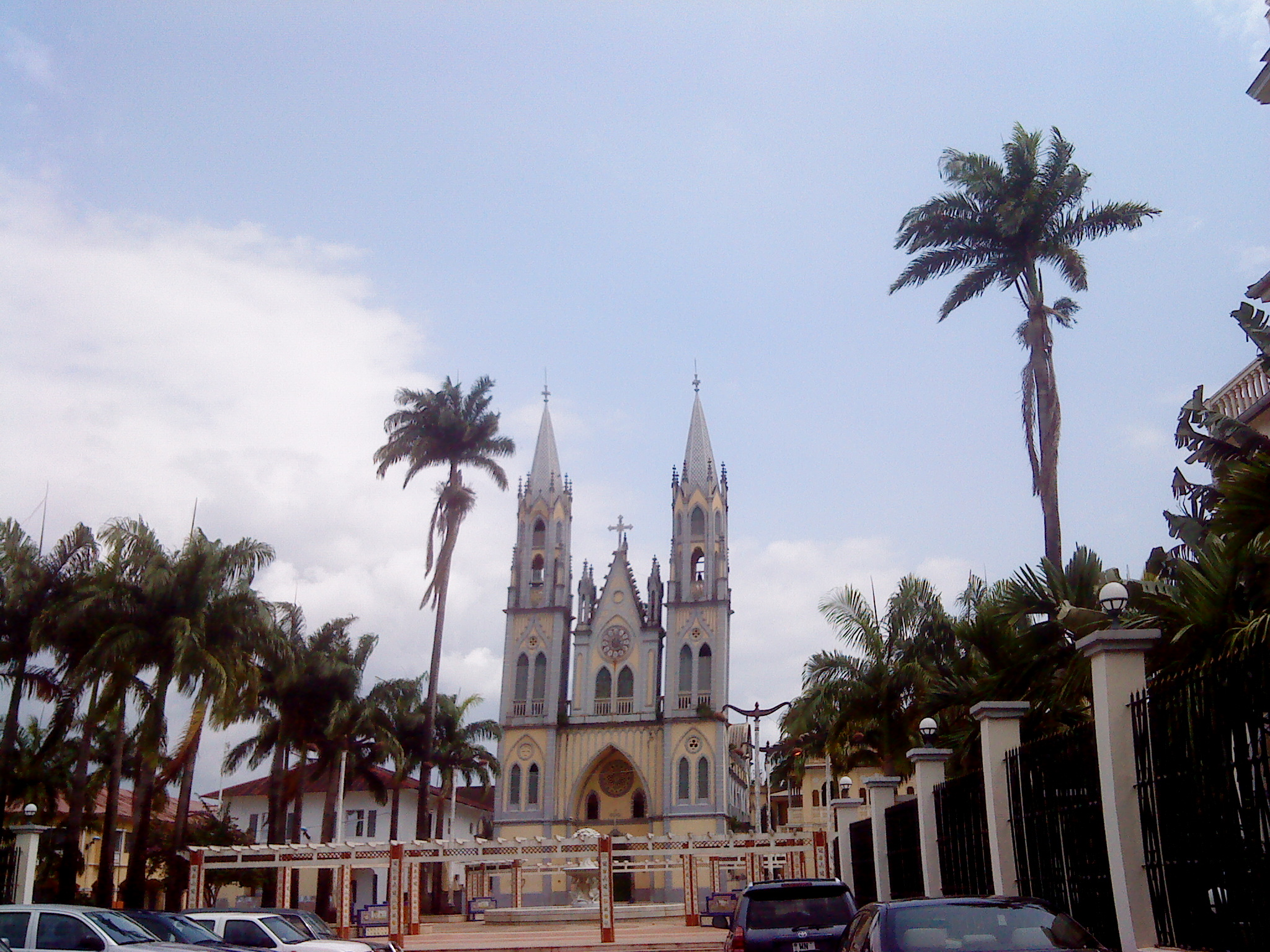
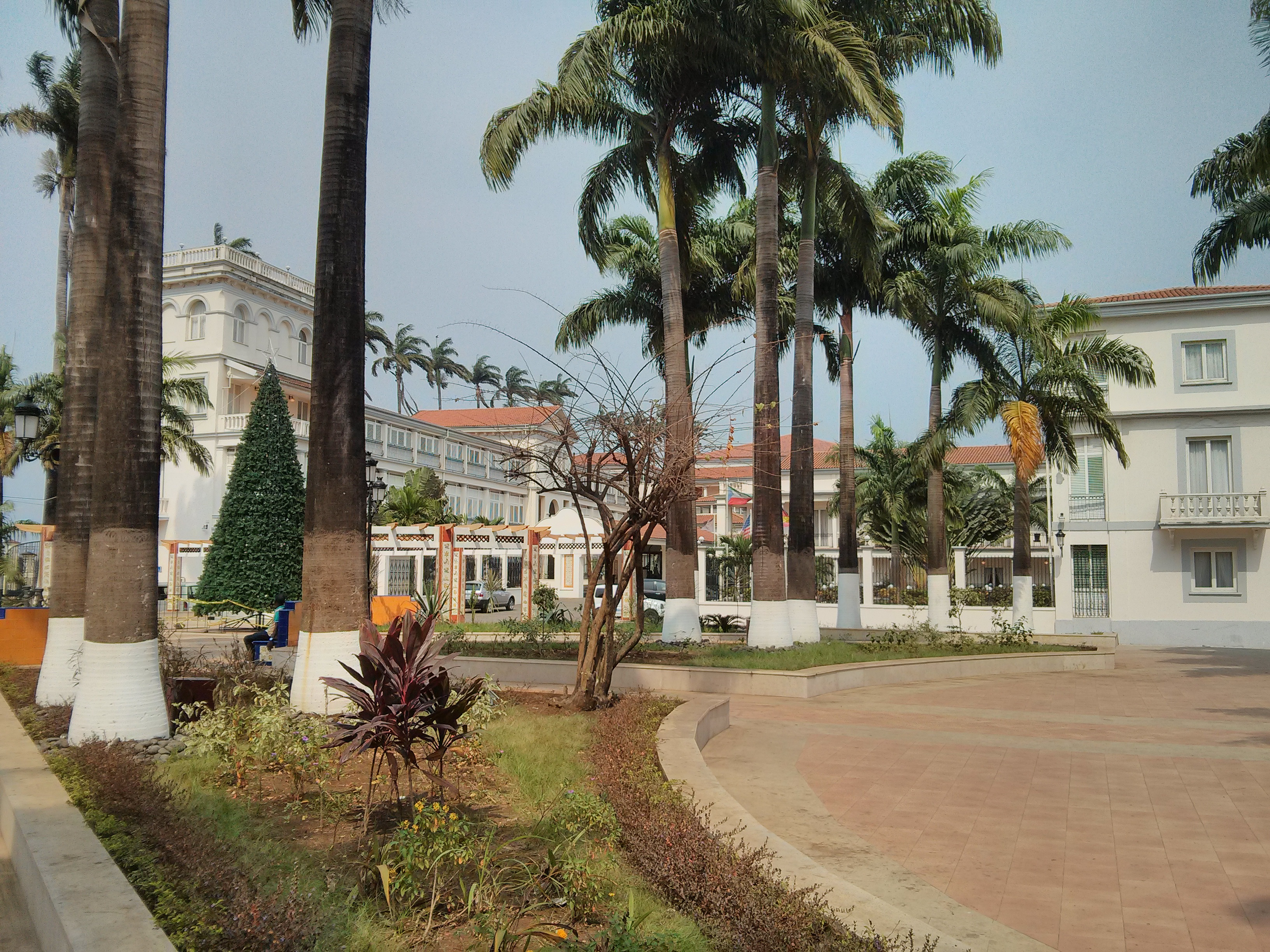
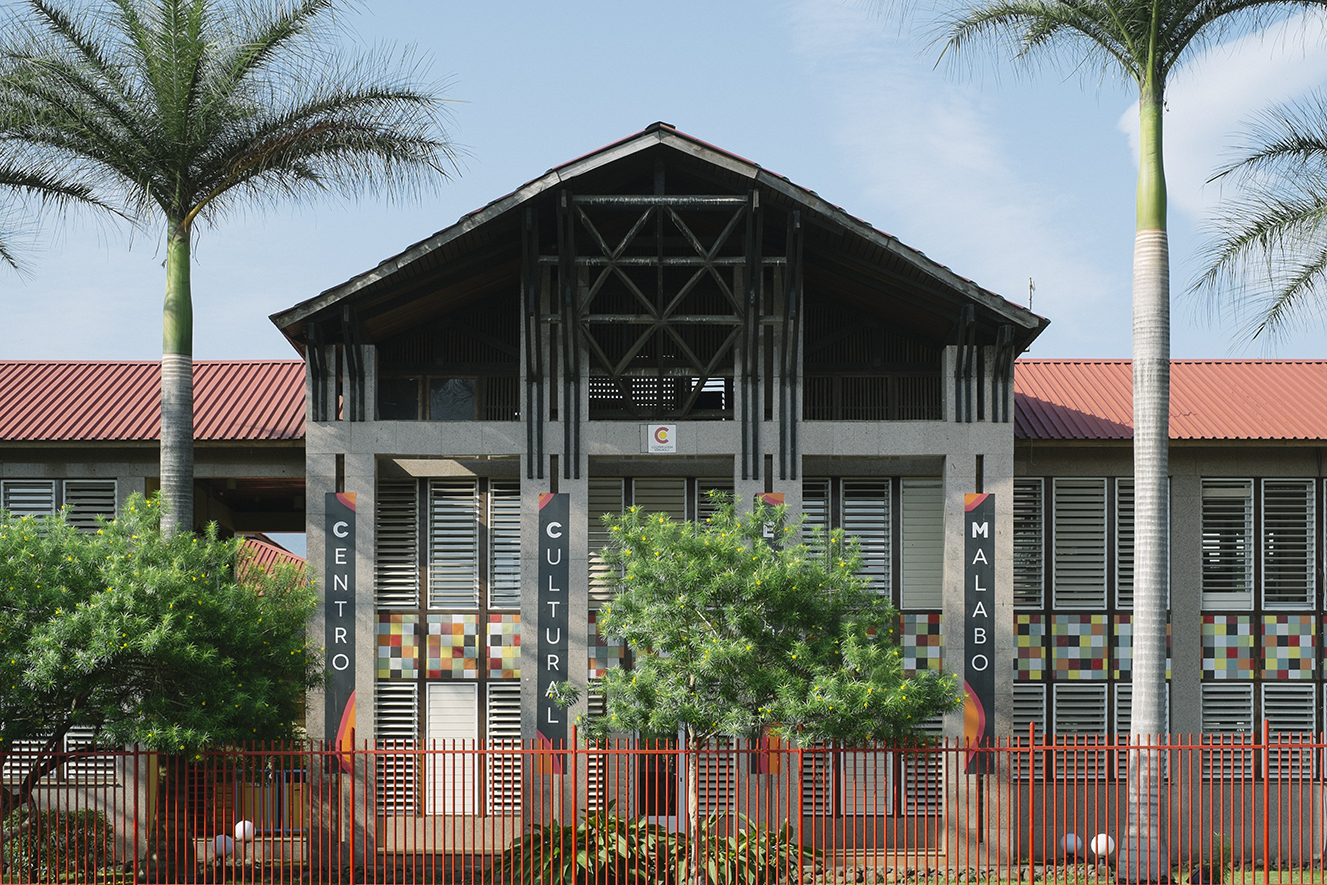
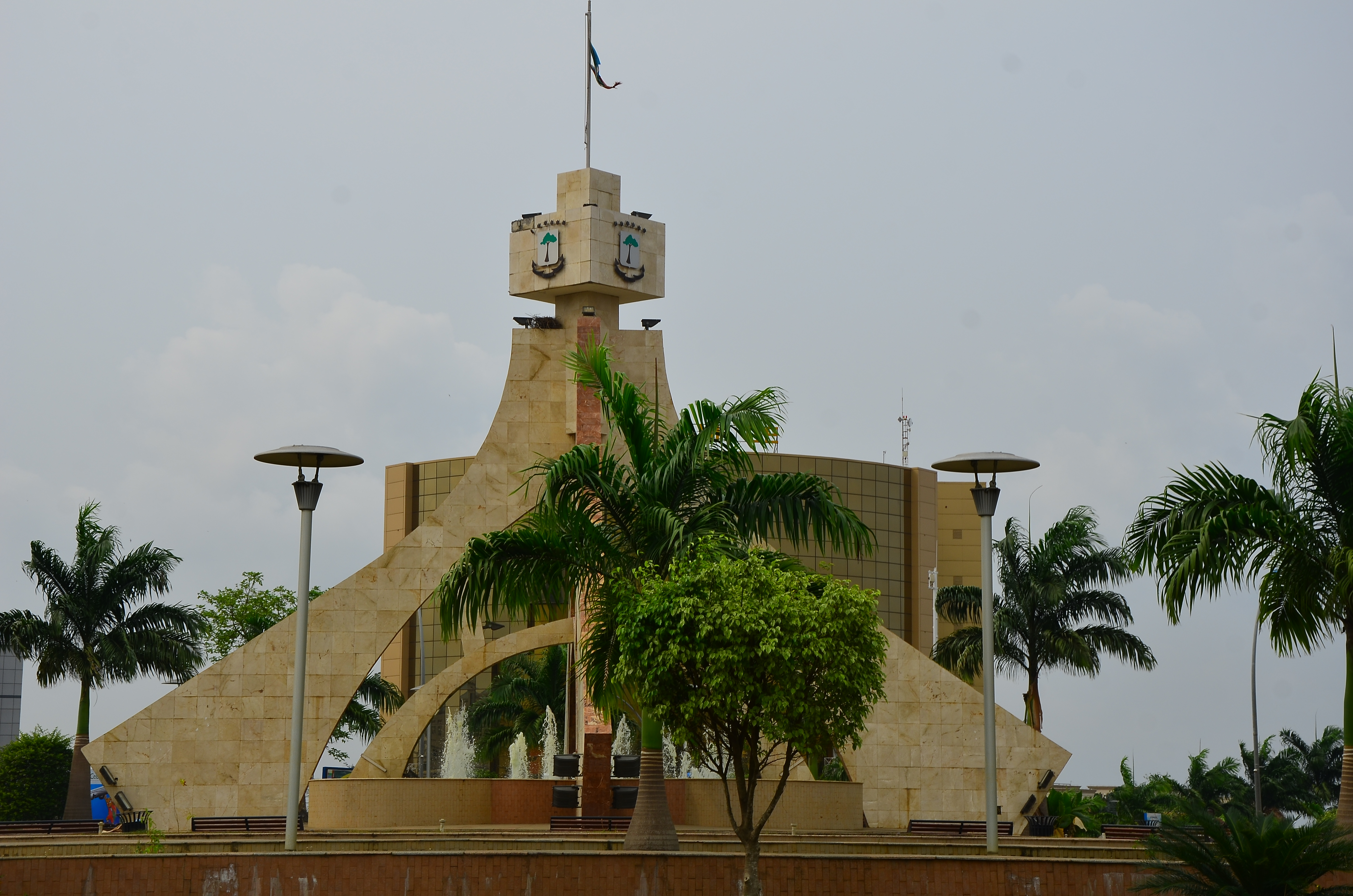
- Top: Malabo skyline; Middle: Cathedral of Santa Isabel, Presidential Palace; Bottom: Spain Cultural Center, Bata Waterfront

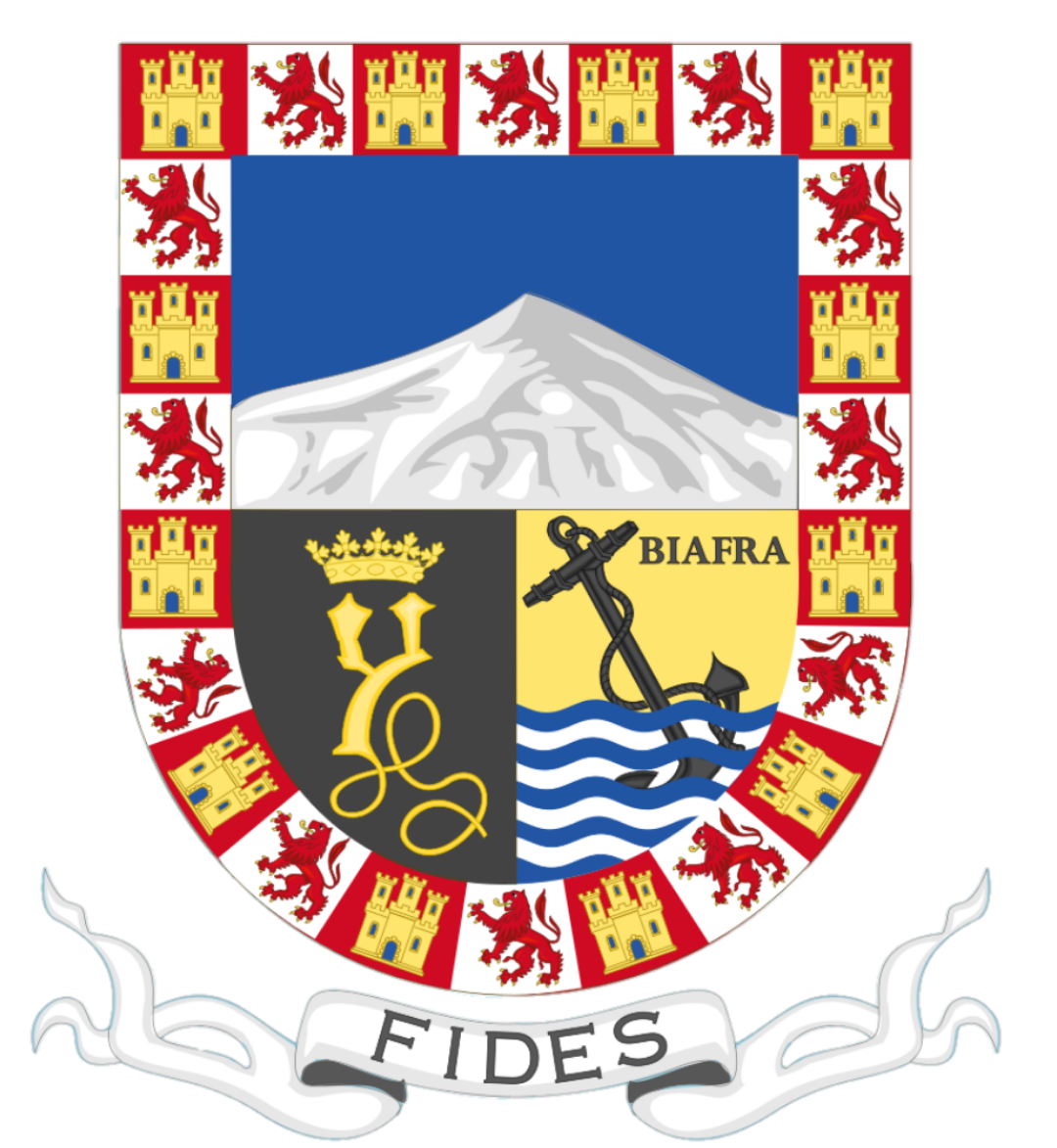
- Coat of arms

- Location in Equatorial Guinea Malabo (Africa)
- Coordinates: 3°44′44″N 8°46′28″E
- Country: Equatorial Guinea
- Province: Bioko Norte
- Region: Insular Region
- Founded: 1827
- Current name: Since 1973

Area
  - Total: 21 km^{2} (8.1 sq mi)
- Elevation: 0 m (0 ft)

Population (2018)
  - Total: 297,000
  - Density: 14,000/km^{2} (37,000/sq mi)
  - Ethnicities: Bubi • Fernandinos
- Demonym: Malabeño-a
- Time zone: UTC+01:00 (WAT)
- Climate: Am
- HDI (2019): 0.710 high

Malabo (/məˈlɑːboʊ/ mə-LAH-boh, Spanish: [maˈlaβo]; formerly Santa Isabel [ˈsantajsaˈβel]) is a city in Equatorial Guinea, located in the province of Bioko Norte. It is located on the north coast of the island of Bioko (Bube: Etulá, historically known as Fernando Pó by the Europeans). In 2018, the city had a population of approximately 297,000 inhabitants.

Spanish is the official language of the city and of the country as well, but Pichinglis is also used as a language of wider communication across Bioko island, including Malabo.

Malabo is the oldest city in Equatorial Guinea and served as its former capital. Ciudad de la Paz became the new capital of Equatorial Guinea on 2 January 2026. The institutions of governance of Equatorial Guinea began the process of locating to Ciudad de la Paz in February 2017. The designation as capital would be returned many times, finally becoming permanent on 20 June 2026.

== History ==
=== European discovery and Portuguese occupation ===
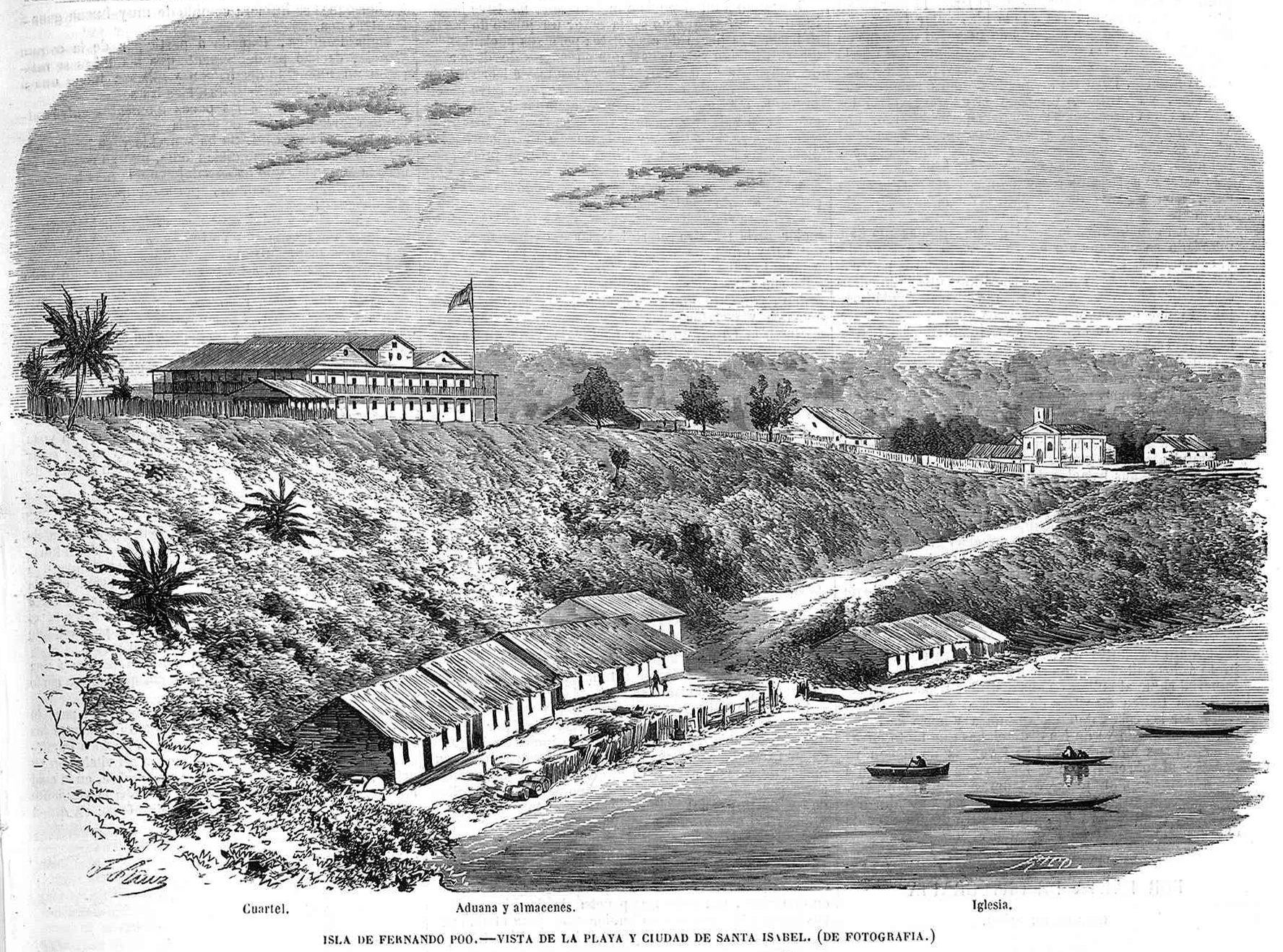

In 1472, in an attempt to find a new route to India, the Portuguese navigator Fernão do Pó, encountered the island of Bioko, which he called Formosa. Later, the island was named after its discoverer, Fernando Pó. At the beginning of the 16th century, specifically in 1507, the Portuguese Ramos de Esquivel made a first attempt at colonisation on the island of Fernando Pó. He established a factory in Concepción (now Riaba) and developed plantations of sugarcane.

With the Treaties of San Ildefonso in 1777 and El Pardo in 1778, during the reign of the Spanish King Charles III, the Portuguese gave to the Spanish the islands of Fernando Pó, Annobón, and the right to conduct trade in the mainland, an area of influence of approximately 800 000 km^{2} in Africa, in exchange for the Colonia del Sacramento in Río de la Plata and the Santa Catarina Island off the Brazilian coast (occupied by the Spaniards) during a recent war trying to stop Portuguese expansion in the Viceroyalty of the Río de la Plata. The area stretched from the Niger Delta to the mouth of Ogooué River, now in Gabon, and included, besides the islands of Fernando Pó and Annobón, the islets of Corisco and Elobeyes. Spain was uninterested in those lands because it already had vast colonies in other parts of the world, Spain lost interest in Spanish Guinea in 1827 and authorised the British to use the island as a base for suppressing the African slave trade.

=== British presence ===
In 1821, the Nelly approached the island of Fernando Pó. He found it abandoned and founded the establishments of Melville Bay (now Riaba) and San Carlos (now Luba). Some years later, another British captain, William Fitzwilliam Owen, decided to colonise the island and in the north of it — on the site of the present capital — erected a base for British ships hunting slave traders. Thus, on 25 December 1827, Port Clarence was founded on the ruins of a previous Portuguese settlement. The name was chosen in honour of the Duke of Clarence, who later became King William IV. The Bubis indigenous to the island called it Ripotó (place of the foreigners). The population of the capital was increased by the arrival of slaves freed by the British. These freedmen were settled in Port Clarence before the establishment of Sierra Leone as a colony for freed slaves. The descendants of these freed slaves remained on the island. They joined other migrants who arrived as free workers from Liberia, Sierra Leone, Ghana, Ivory Coast, Benin, Nigeria and Cameroon, and became the population group called Creole or fernandinos, whose language was Pichinglis, a Bantu-English Creole with some Spanish elements.

During the British period, the British consul automatically became the governor of the colony, including Governor John Beecroft, a British mulatto who modernised the capital, and whose work was later recognised by Spain with a monument in Punta Fernanda.

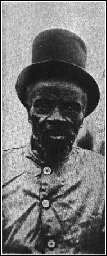
Malabo Löpèlo Mëlaka, Malabo I of Bioko

=== Spanish definitive control and new capital ===
In 1844, when Queen Isabella II of Spain ruled after the regency of her mother Maria Cristina and Baldomero Espartero, in an attempt to modernise Spain and rescue its heritage, Spain let the UK know its desire to regain control of the colony and thus the island. It took another decade to implement this direct control. The capital already had more dynamic and Protestant religious missions which were very successful. Both factors helped to change the attitude of Spain, in addition to internal reasons already alluded.

Spain again took control of the island in 1855 and the capital, Port Clarence, was renamed Santa Isabel, in honor of Queen Isabella II. The capital of the island of Fernando Pó became the capital of Equatorial Guinea.

Its present name was given to the town in 1973 as part of the campaign of President Francisco Macías Nguema to replace place names of European origin with African names, in this case honouring Malabo Löpèlo Mëlaka, the last Bubi king. Malabo, the son of King Moka, surrendered to the Spaniards. His uncle Sas Ebuera, head of the Bubi warriors, claimed to represent legitimate Bubi rule and continued resisting, confronting the Spanish openly in 1898. After the Spanish killed Sas Ebuera, Malabo became the king unopposed, but with no authority. Bubi clans and settlements were slow to accept Spanish sovereignty over the island, and the full conquest of the island was not achieved until 1912.

=== Reign of Terror ===
During the so-called Reign of Terror of Macías Nguema, the dictator suppressed much of the intelligentsia of the country, initiating the process of taking over the positions of the public administration by part of the natives of Mongomo and clan Esangui.

The infamous Black Beach prison, also known as Blay Beach prison (or Playa Negra prison), sits at the mouth of the Cónsul River, beside the black beach and behind the Governor's Palace and barracks. Several people have been jailed there during the 35 years of dictatorship. Among those imprisoned and tortured are many political leaders such as Rafael Upiñalo (Movimiento), Fabián Nsue (UP), Felipe Ondo Obiang (FDR), Martín Puye of Movement for the Self-Determination of Bioko Island (MAIB) or Plácido Micó Abogo of the Social Democratic Convergence for Social Democracy (CPDS). A group of mercenaries were jailed at Black Beach for the 2004 coup d'état attempt against President Teodoro Obiang Nguema Mbasogo.

== Geography ==
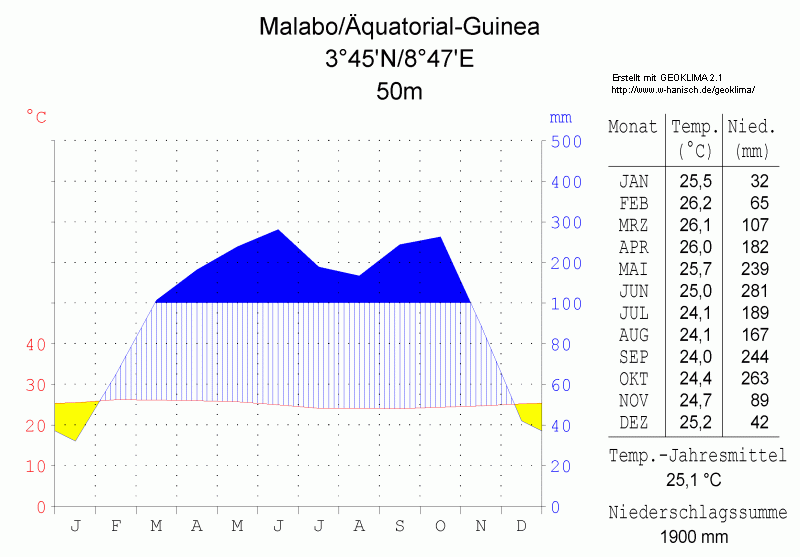
Climatological diagram of Malabo

Malabo is situated in the north of the island of Bioko, at coordinates 3° 45' 7.43" North and 8° 46' 25.32" East. The south of Malabo is limited by the Cónsul River and just across the river, south-west, is the hospital. West of the city, located about 9 km from the centre of Malabo, is the renewed Malabo International Airport. In the coastal region north of the city are the bays and capes. The elder is the Punta de la Unidad Africana located just behind the Malabo Government Building and which occupies the entire eastern part of the Bay of Malabo. Another cape of importance is Punta Europa located in the west of the city near to the airport.

=== Climate ===
Malabo features a tropical monsoon climate (Köppen Am). Malabo receives on average 1,850 millimetres or 73 inches of rain per year. The city has a pronounced, albeit short, sunnier (but still cloudy) dry season during December and January. January is normally its driest month with 29 millimetres or 1.14 inches of rain falling on average. It also has a very long cloudy wet season that covers the remaining nine months from March to November. On average, the months hit hardest by the wet season are September and October, which receive 500 millimetres (20 in) of rain and showers between them.

Daytime temperatures do not vary at all day to day, and vary only a few degrees throughout the entire year. At night, the average low temperature is 20 to 21 °C (68 to 70 °F) in every month of the year but January to April have a slightly higher diurnal range because it is clearer. Nonetheless, with only 1,020 hours of sunshine per year, Malabo is one of the cloudiest, wettest and most lightning-prone capitals of the world, and experiences much fog and haze even when it is not raining in the driest months.

Climate data for Malabo
Month	Jan	Feb	Mar	Apr	May	Jun	Jul	Aug	Sep	Oct	Nov	Dec	Year
Record high °C (°F)	34.2 (93.6)	35.3 (95.5)	34.5 (94.1)	36.5 (97.7)	34.0 (93.2)	32.5 (90.5)	31.5 (88.7)	32.0 (89.6)	32.5 (90.5)	32.5 (90.5)	32.5 (90.5)	33.5 (92.3)	36.5 (97.7)
Mean daily maximum °C (°F)	31.1 (88.0)	31.8 (89.2)	31.3 (88.3)	31.3 (88.3)	30.5 (86.9)	29.5 (85.1)	28.4 (83.1)	28.0 (82.4)	28.1 (82.6)	28.8 (83.8)	29.8 (85.6)	30.8 (87.4)	30.0 (86.0)
Daily mean °C (°F)	26.9 (80.4)	27.7 (81.9)	27.6 (81.7)	27.2 (81.0)	26.7 (80.1)	25.9 (78.6)	25.3 (77.5)	25.0 (77.0)	25.1 (77.2)	25.5 (77.9)	26.1 (79.0)	26.6 (79.9)	26.3 (79.3)
Mean daily minimum °C (°F)	23.0 (73.4)	23.9 (75.0)	24.1 (75.4)	23.8 (74.8)	23.5 (74.3)	23.3 (73.9)	23.2 (73.8)	23.1 (73.6)	22.8 (73.0)	22.9 (73.2)	23.0 (73.4)	22.7 (72.9)	23.3 (73.9)
Record low °C (°F)	17.0 (62.6)	16.5 (61.7)	15.5 (59.9)	16.5 (61.7)	15.0 (59.0)	18.0 (64.4)	17.1 (62.8)	15.0 (59.0)	18.5 (65.3)	17.6 (63.7)	19.0 (66.2)	17.5 (63.5)	15.0 (59.0)
Average rainfall mm (inches)	28.9 (1.14)	70.6 (2.78)	102.7 (4.04)	155.7 (6.13)	227.1 (8.94)	260.8 (10.27)	202.0 (7.95)	177.1 (6.97)	250.1 (9.85)	254.3 (10.01)	100.3 (3.95)	39.6 (1.56)	1,869.1 (73.59)
Average rainy days (≥ 1.0 mm)	3.5	4.6	9.8	12.0	17.2	19.0	17.5	14.8	20.6	19.5	10.3	4.0	152.7
Average relative humidity (%)	83	83	84	84	87	89	90	89	91	90	88	84	87
Mean monthly sunshine hours	120.9	121.5	108.5	114.0	99.2	66.0	43.4	52.7	48.0	71.3	87.0	117.8	1,050.3
Mean daily sunshine hours	3.9	4.3	3.5	3.8	3.2	2.2	1.4	1.7	1.6	2.3	2.9	3.8	2.9
Source: Deutscher Wetterdienst

== Administration ==
The mayor is María Coloma Edjang Mbengono, who establishes the municipal services prescribed by law, which are the responsibility of the municipality. These include drinking water and other public sources, lighting, paving of roads, cemeteries, cleaning and sanitation, the sanitary waste treatment and waste, disinfecting, emergency first aid, health inspections and drinks, health inspection of poor housing, public banks, slaughterhouses, markets, and the elimination of stagnant water.

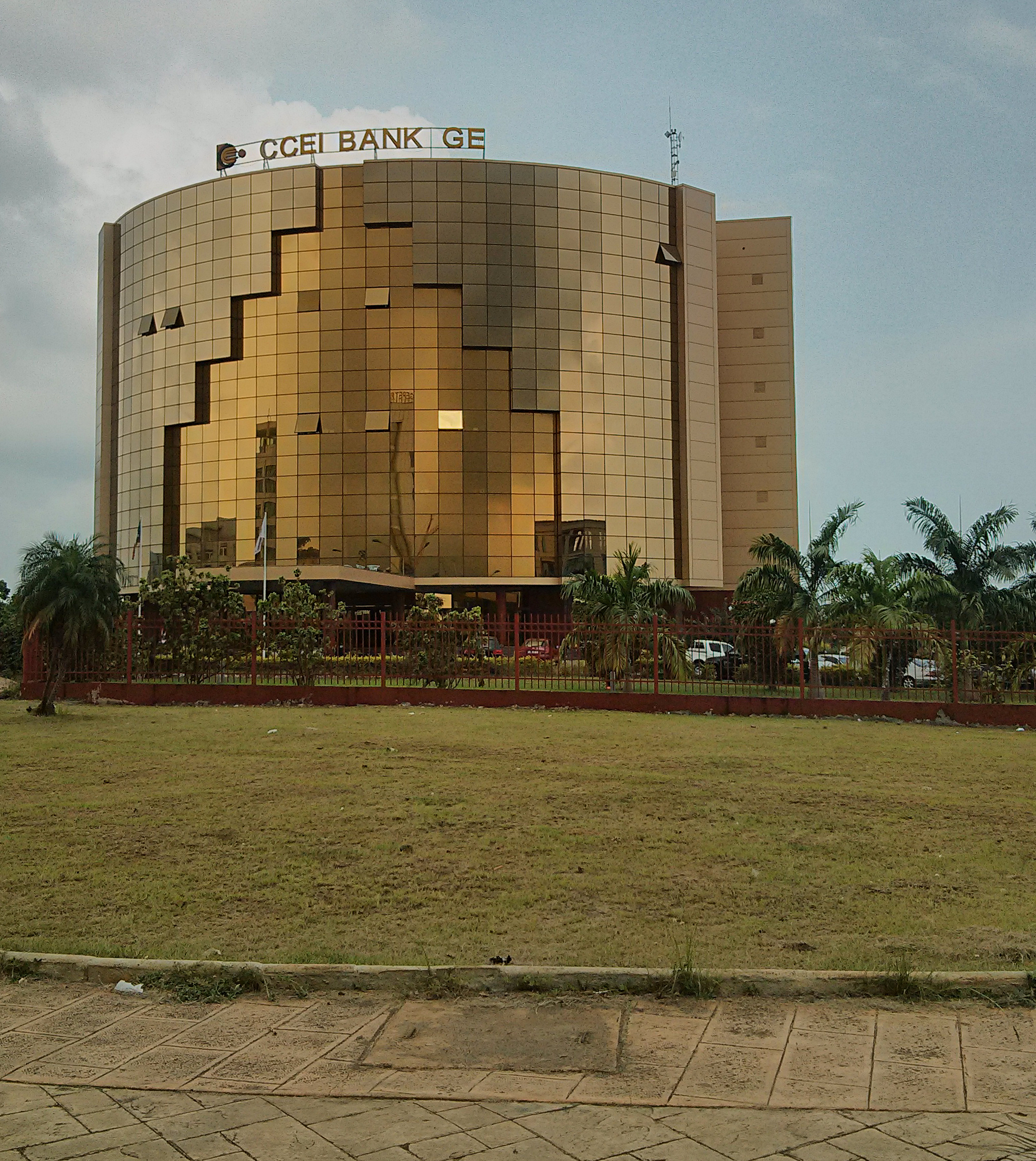
CCEI Bank headquarters in Malabo

=== Mayors since 1960 ===
- Wilwardo Jones Níger
- Abilio Balboa Arking
- Antonio Ribeiro Ebuera
- Julio Bonete Eiye
- Julián Ehapo Bomaho
- Vidal Djoni Bekoba
- Tomás Alfredo King Tomas
- Rosendo Toichoa Borico
- Felipe Beta Tobachi
- Antonio Ribeiro Ebuera
- Elías Manuel Macho Ricacha
- Basilio Cañadas Idjabe
- Cristina Djombe Djangani
- Vicente Ebong Uwa
- Bernardino Edu Oba
- Victorino Bolekia Bonay
- Gabriel Mba Bela
- María Coloma Edjang Mbengono
- Isabel Eraul Ivina (2004)

== Cultural centres ==
Through the Spanish Agency for International Cooperation for Development (AECID), are made several development projects at both regional and national level. Headquartered in the Technical Cooperation Office in Malabo (created in 1984), carried out actions for the development of the culture, health, education and institutional strengthening. Stressing the Cultural Center of Spain in Malabo (CCEM), founded in 2003, where young people are encouraged to feel a cultural space where they can unleash their creative freedom. It also has three geographical axes, in order to capture the largest number of people in the region and contribute to its development. Activities include the training, art, film, theater, music and games, with the two main festivals: Travelling Film Festival of Equatorial Guinea (FECIGE) and the International Festival of Hip Hop in Malabo.

Another important centre is the Hispano-Guinean Cultural Center, from 2012 Equatorial Guinean Cultural Center began as headquarters of Institute Cardinal Cisneros, and then archive, museum and library. It was built in the 1950s.

The Museum of Modern Art Equatorial Guinea has traditional and contemporary art of the country and the continent. The city also hosts the National Library, built in 1916.

== Tourism ==
The tourism sector is seeing significant expansion. Since the discovery of oil, numerous infrastructural developments have been made. The city of Malabo is a focal point for tourism in Equatorial Guinea, due to its direct connections with major tourist attractions on the island of Bioko. Nearby tourist attractions include the following:

- San Antonio de Ureca: A small town located in the south of the island rich in primates, birds, beaches, and waterfalls. During the months of November to February, it is possible to observe the spawning of leatherback sea turtles during the night.
- Ilachi or Iladyi Waterfalls: They are the largest waterfalls in the country with more than 250 meters of fall. They are approximately a 45-minute walk from the city of Moka.
- Pico Basilé: The highest mountain in Equatorial Guinea, it belongs to the volcanic shield next to Mount Cameroon and to the great caldera of Luba. The mountain is more than 3,000 metres (9,800 ft) high, and is visible from all over the city of Malabo. A church and statue of Mother Bisila is located atop the mountain. The sculpture was created by the Spanish sculptor Modesto Gené Roig in 1968.
- The luxury resort of Sipopo, which was first built for the 2011 African Union Summit.

== Demographics ==
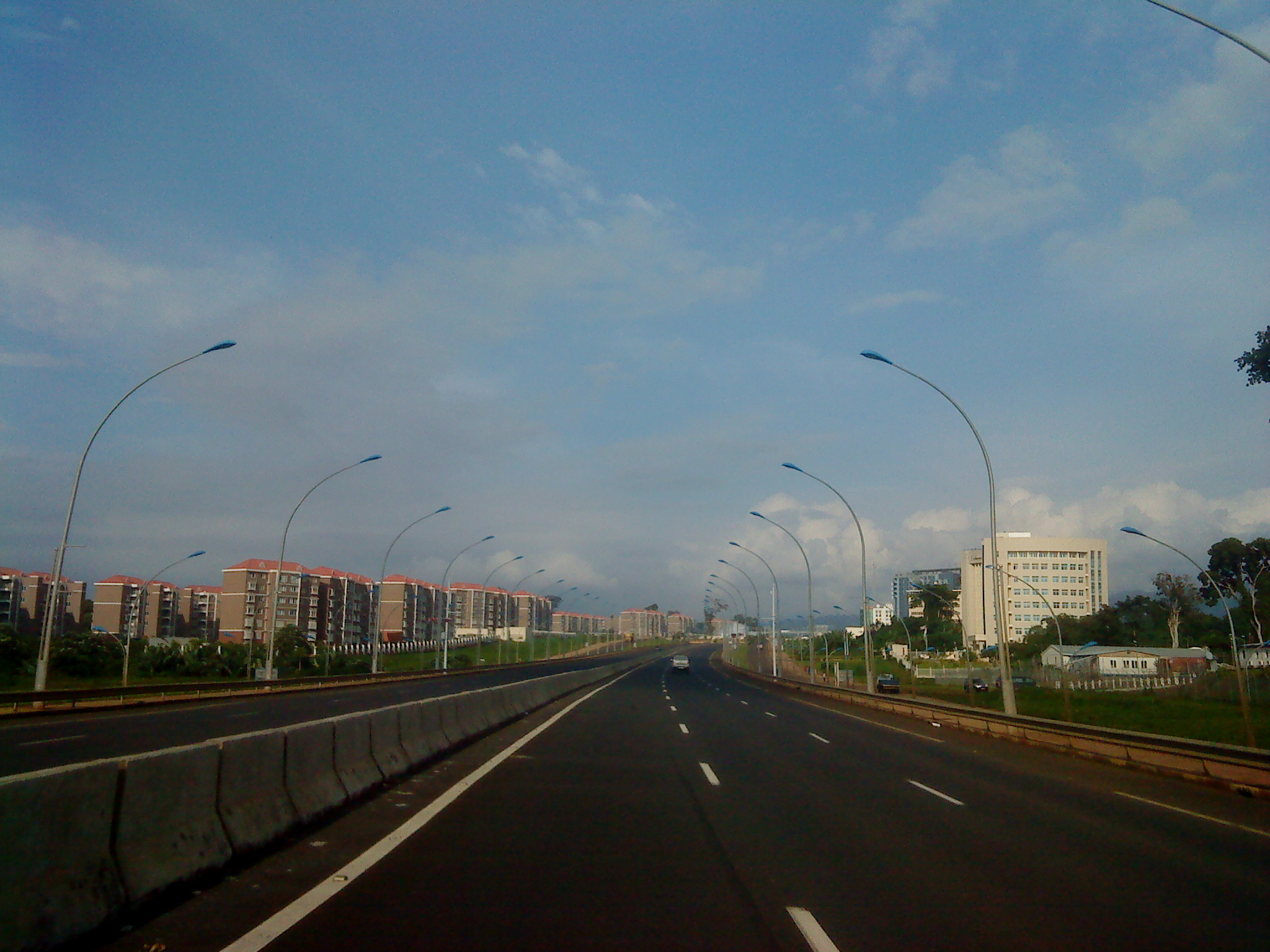
One of the main roads in Malabo

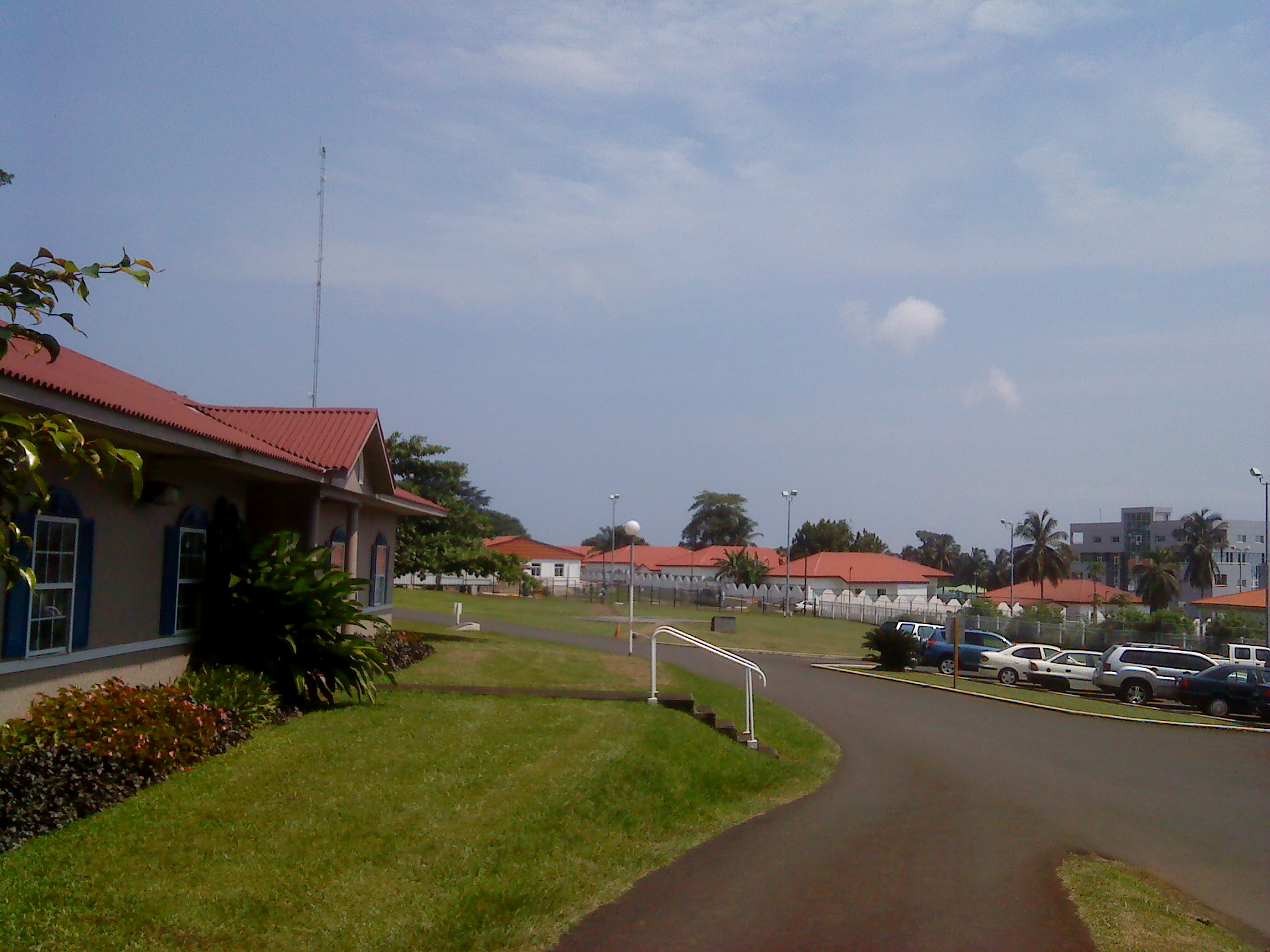
Abayak neighborhood, west of Malabo

Growth of population of Malabo
Year	Persons	%
1983	31 650	–
1994	60 065	+89.8
2000	73 117	+21.7
2007	96 000	31.3
1983 and 1994: censuses 2000 and 2007: estimated

Malabo has a relatively young population. Approximately 45% of the population is under 15. Only about 4% of the population is more than 65 years old. Most of the population lives in rural areas of the island.

== Economy ==
Malabo is the country's commercial and financial centre. Malabo's economy is based on the administration and other services. Trade is also one of the most prominent and important economic activities, especially since the arrival of US companies which exploit oil wells close to the coast. This trade also comes from the presence of Americans, Mexicans, Nigerians, Cameroonians, Spanish and other Central Africans; The building that was originally built by the Banco Popular Español, but after independence became the seat of Banco de Guinea Ecuatorial.

The main industry in the city is fishing, while cacao and coffee are the main products of export.

Malabo has a high-tonnage port, connected mainly with the ports of Douala, (Cameroon) and Bata, and an air link via an international airport.

== Education ==
The National University of Equatorial Guinea (UNGE) and the National Distance Education University (UNED), the latter Spanish-language, have headquarters in the city. The Colegio Nacional Enrique Nvó Okenve, another of the country's universities, has one of its two campuses in the city.

International schools:

- Colegio Español Don Bosco
- Equatorial Guinea Turkish International College
- Royal International College

== Attractions ==
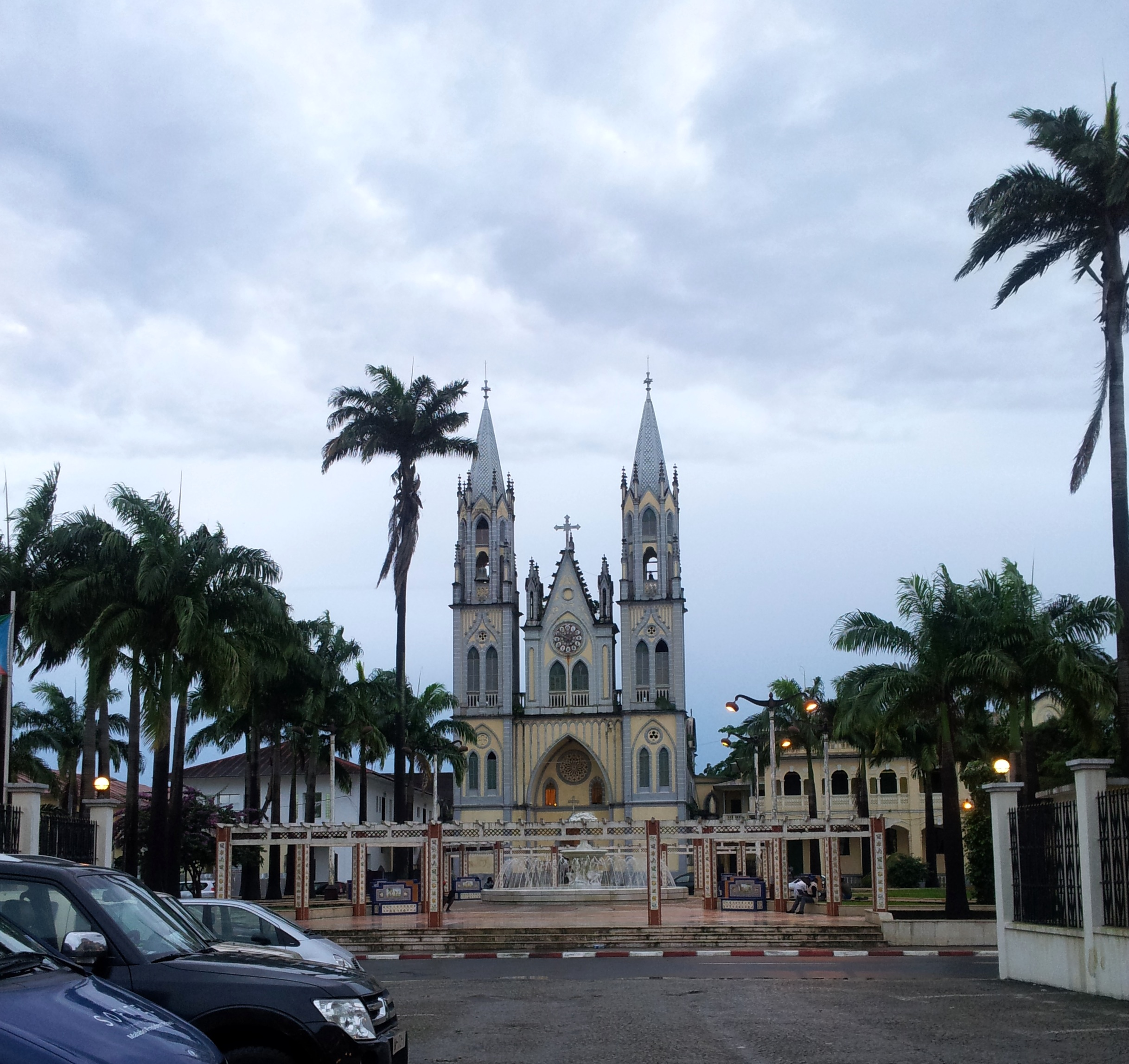
Cathedral of Santa Isabel

Malabo has preserved buildings from the colonial era, such as the Presidential Palace and the Palace of Justice of Malabo. Other colonial buildings are also found downtown, although they are worn; for example the wooden 19th-century buildings on Nigeria and Rey Boncoro streets.

Notable buildings include the Cathedral of Santa Isabel, of the Roman Catholic Archdiocese of Malabo. It is a church in the Gothic Revival style, built between 1897 and 1916. Its architect was Luis Segarra Llairadó, paid by contributions from the government of Spain and the donations of the faithful. It has two spires 40 meters high. In January 2020 a fire due to an electrical failure caused the calcination of part of its structure, currently there is work ongoing for an early restoration in November 2021.

Other points of interest are La Gaditana, known as Finca Amilivia prior to 1918, the casa Teodolita, built in 1902 and one of the oldest homes in the city, the City Hall building in Malabo, the Church of Elá Nguema, Independence Square, Parque Nacional de Malabo, the Casa de España and the bay of the harbour.

== Transport ==
=== Public transport system ===
Public buses make the journey between downtown Malabo and the neighbourhood of Ela Nguema. Taxis circulate in the city and outlying areas.

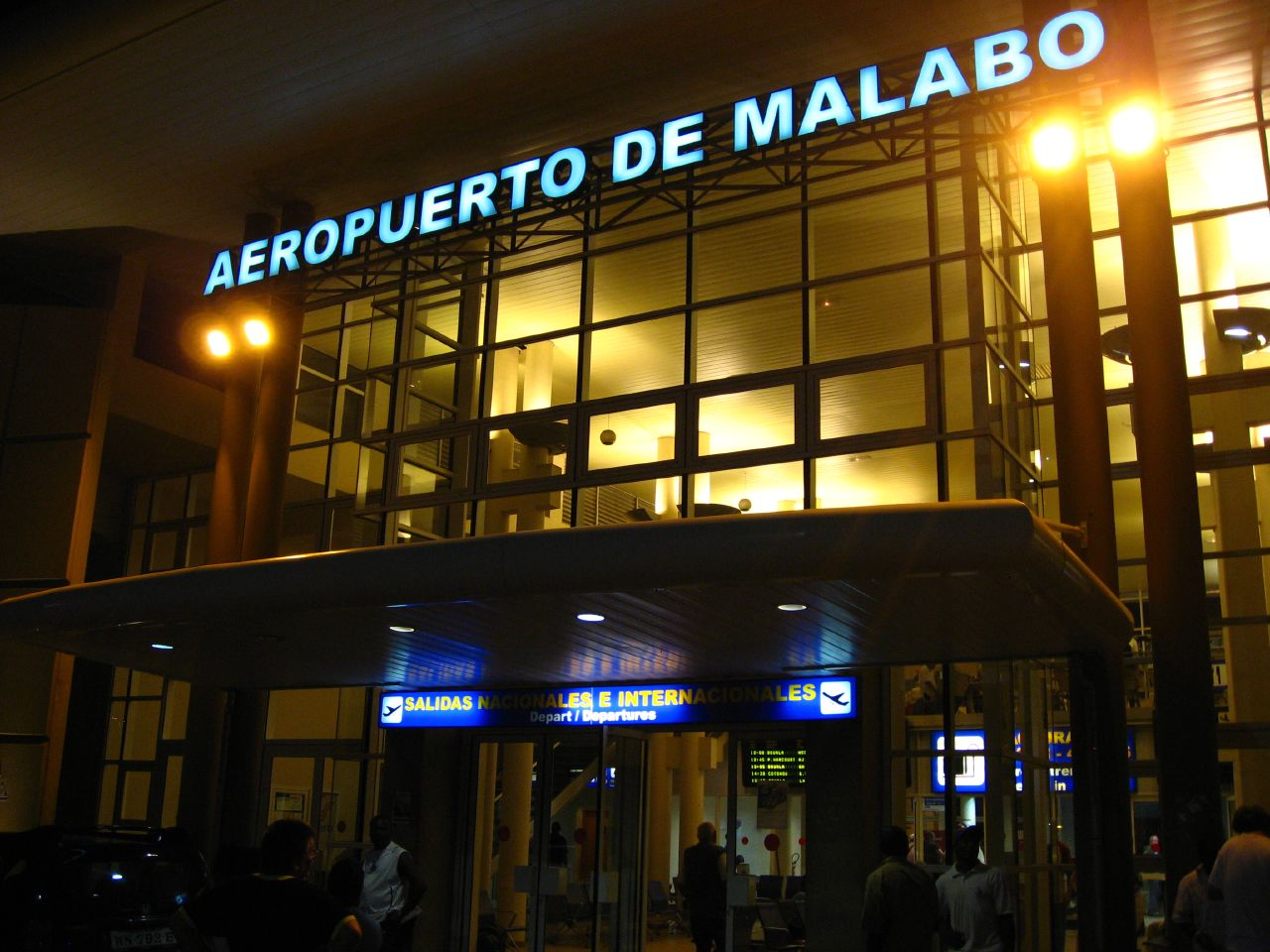
Malabo International Airport

=== Maritime transport ===
The port of Malabo can theoretically reach a treatment capacity of 200,000 tons/year. The main maritime links are with national destination to Bata and international to Spain and Douala in Cameroon.

=== Aviation ===
The Malabo International Airport serves the city. It is located 7 km from the centre in Punta Europa, Bioko. It serves long-distance direct flights to Europe and some African capitals.

From Malabo airport, one can fly to any of the other airports in the country. These airports are located in the region of Annobón, Bata, Mongomoyen, and Corisco.

== Places of worship ==
Among the places of worship, they are predominantly Christian churches and temples (Catholic: Roman Catholic Archdiocese of Malabo, Protestant, Evangelical Christian: Assemblies of God). Malabo Mosque was established in 2015.

== Sports ==
The main sports facility of Malabo, and the country, is the Estadio de Malabo, with a capacity of 15,250 spectators. The stadium is home to the Equatorial Guinea national football team and hosted matches during the 2012 Africa Cup of Nations. Notably, the Spain national football team, at the time World Champions, played a friendly at this stadium. The stadium also is home to the CD Elá Nguema, the main club of the country. Also located in Malabo is the Estadio Internacional. The Estadio Internacional has a 6,000-seat capacity. The Equatorial Guinea national football team played here until the Estadio de Malabo was opened.

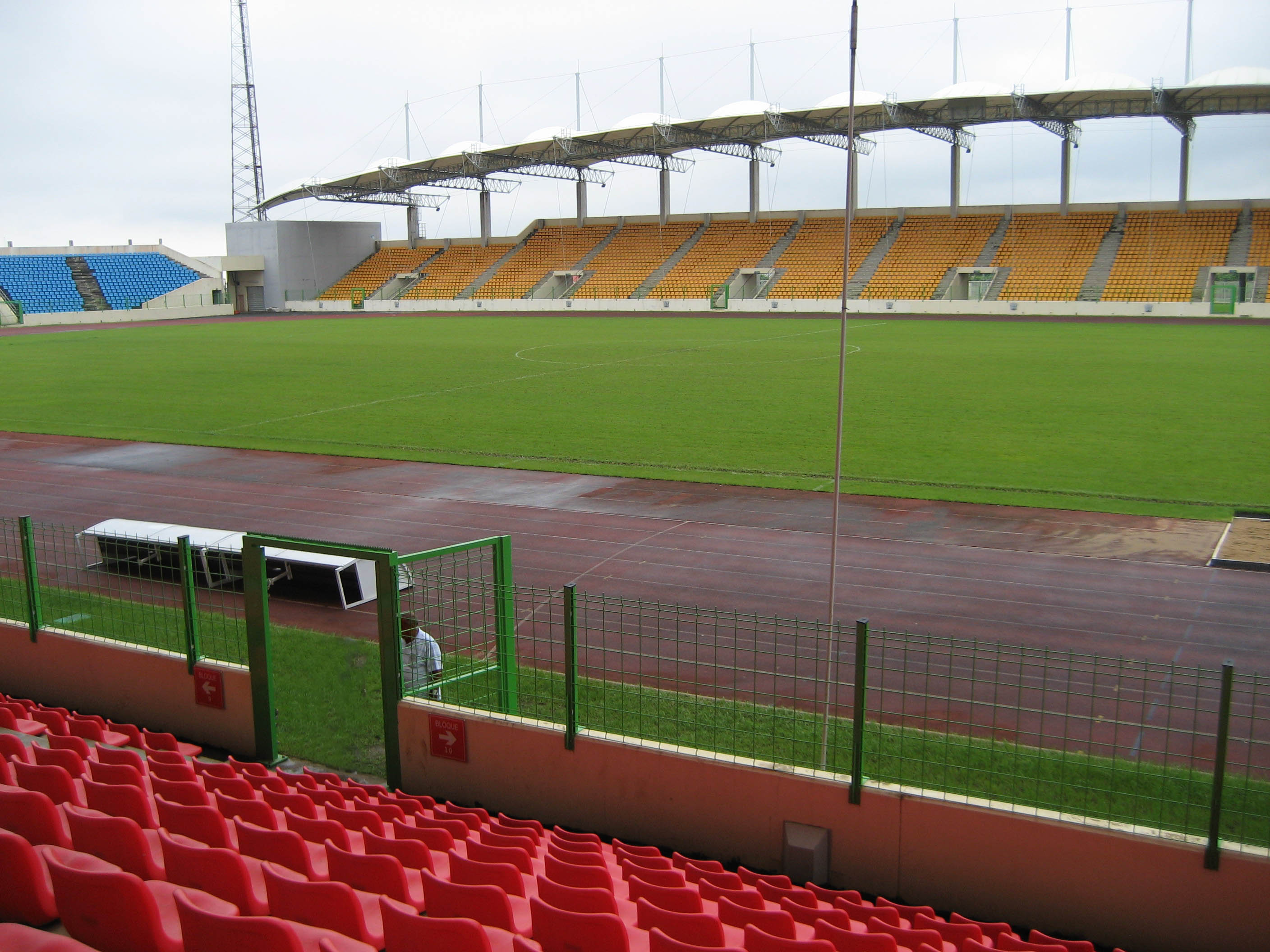
Estadio de Malabo

The 2012 Africa Cup of Nations was organised jointly by Gabon and Equatorial Guinea. One of the four venues for the tournament was the Estadio de Malabo, the main stadium of the country, constructed in 2007. In Malabo were disputed six matches of the group stage (one match of Group A and five of group B), and one cross of quarterfinals

On 16 November 2013, the Spain national football team played a friendly match against the Equatorial Guinea national football team. It was the first visit by a European team to the country, and the match was criticised by several organisations, including the president of the Liga Nacional de Fútbol Profesional, Javier Tebas, due to the political situation of the country and the government of Teodoro Obiang Nguema Mbasogo.

Some of the top clubs in the country, who have won the Equatoguinean Primera División several times, are from Malabo. The club with the most league titles is the CD Elá Nguema with 14. Other league champions from the city are the Renacimiento FC and the Atlético Malabo or Cafe Bank Sportif. Another club in the city is the Atlético Semu, once champion of Equatoguinean Cup.

Another important club from the city is the Malabo Kings of basketball, which was champion of the country, and in 2013 was proclaimed champion Central Zone of Africa Basketball Championship, winning in Kinshasa at Talia from Gabon. The Malabo Kings had already finished second in 2011, Yaoundé (Cameroon). In 2013 held in Malabo on I Campus of Basketball Ciudad de Malabo organized by the Equatorial Guinea Basketball Federation and Club de Baloncesto Conejero from Spain.

Malabo was originally to host the 2019 African Games but due to economic problems they decide to withdraw its hosting rights and was replaced by Casablanca, Morocco.

== Discovery of oil ==
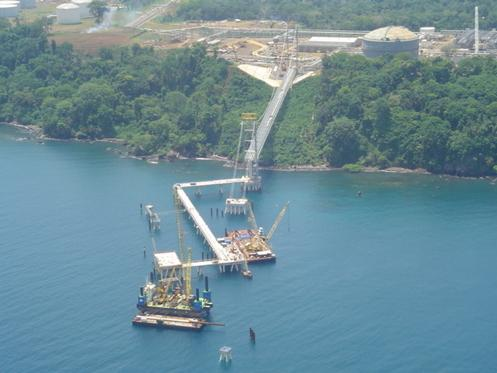
The suspension bridge and shipping terminal of the EG LNG liquefied natural gas company, seen from the air

Malabo has been significantly affected by Teodoro Obiang Nguema Mbasogo's growing co-operation with the petroleum industry. The country's production has reached 360,000 barrels per day (57,000 m^{3}/d) as of 2005, an increase which led to a doubling of the city's population, but for the vast majority, very little of that wealth has been invested in development.

== Twin towns – sister cities ==
- Guadalajara, Mexico
- Celaya, Mexico
- Acayucan, Mexico
- Buenos Aires, Argentina

== Notable people ==
- Juan Tomás Ávila Laurel, Equatoguinean author and activist
- John Batchelor, British rugby player
- Rita Bosaho, Equatoguinean-Spanish politician and activist
- Rusly Cachina Esapa, Equatoguinean transgender rights activist
- Elsa López, Spanish writer and poet

== Gallery ==
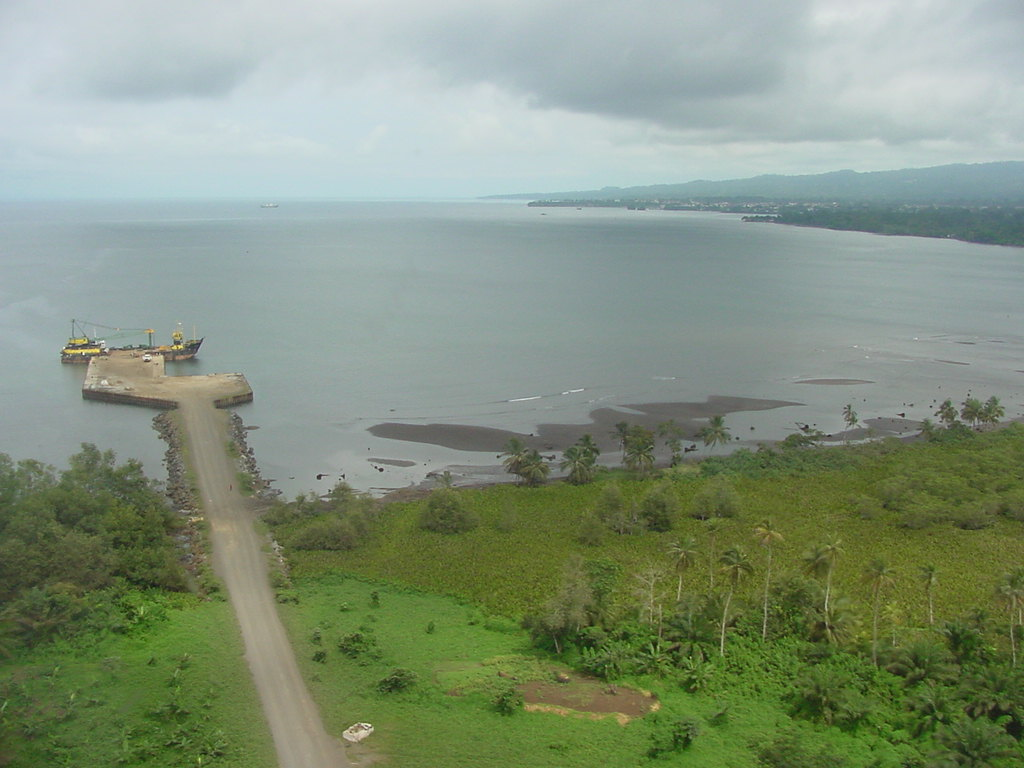
Malabo coast line
