= Futuro Kings FC =

Equatoguinean football club

Futuro Kings
- Full name: Futuro Kings FC
- Founded: 2017; 8 years ago
- Dissolved: 2023; 2 years ago
- Ground: Futuro de Mongomo
- League: Unregistered
- Website: https://web.archive.org/web/20190517010024/https://www.futurokings.com/
Home colours	Away colours

Futuro Kings FC was an Equatorial Guinean football club based in the city of Mongomo. It played in the Liga Nacional de Fútbol. The club was founded in 2017 as a result of the merger between Malabo Kings BC (a basketball team) and Estrellas de Futuro de Mongomo (a football team).
