= CD Elá Nguema =

Equatoguinean football club

Sony Elá Nguema
- Full name: Sony de Elá Nguema
- Nickname: Los Merengues (The Meringues)
- Ground: Estadio de Malabo; Malabo, Equatorial Guinea
- Capacity: 15,250
- Chairman: Rosendo Otogo Meñeng
- Coach: Emmanuel Ndoumbe Bosso
- League: Liga Nacional de Fútbol
- 2015–16: Liga Nacional de Fútbol, 1st
Home colours	Away colours

Sony de Elá Nguema is an Equatorial Guinean football club based in the Malabo neighborhood of Elá Nguema. The club won 8 titles in a row, from 1984 to 1991. Sony de Elá Nguema is the most successful football club from Equatorial Guinea.

== Achievements ==
- Equatoguinean Premier League: 16

1984, 1985, 1986, 1987, 1988, 1989, 1990, 1991, 1998, 2000, 2002, 2009, 2011, 2012, 2014, 2015–16.

- Equatoguinean Cup: 7

1980, 1981, 1982, 1983, 1992, 1997, 2004.

- Equatoguinean SuperCup: 1

2011.

== Performance in CAF competitions ==
- CAF Champions League: 5 appearances

1999 – First Round
2001 – First Round
2003 – Preliminary Round
2010 – Preliminary Round
2012 –

- African Cup of Champions Clubs: 3 appearances

1980 – First Round
1988 – Preliminary Round
1992 – Preliminary Round

- CAF Confederation Cup: 2 appearances

2005 – First Round
2011 – Preliminary Round

- CAF Cup: 1 appearance

2000 – Preliminary Round

- CAF Cup Winners' Cup: 6 appearances

1982 – First Round
1983 – First Round

1986 – Preliminary Round
1987 – First Round

1993 – First Round
1998 – Preliminary Round
