= Deportivo Mongomo =

Equatoguinean football club

- Full name: Club Deportivo Mongomo
- Ground: Estadio de Mongomo
- Capacity: 10,000
- Chairman: Fermín Esono Ayong Ondo
- Head coach: Almamy Diaby
- League: Liga Nacional de Fútbol
- 2023–24: 1st
Home colours

Deportivo Mongomo is an Equatorial Guinean football club based in the city of Mongomo. They participate in the Equatoguinean Primera División, and won that league in 1980, 1997, 2010, 2022 and 2024.

== Achievements ==
- Equatoguinean Primera División: 5

1980, 1997, 2010, 2021–22, 2023–24.

- Equatoguinean Cup: 1

2015

== Performance in CAF competitions ==
- CAF Champions League: 1 appearance

2011 – Preliminary Round

== Players ==
=== Current squad ===
As of 21 August 2024

Note: Flags indicate national team as defined under FIFA eligibility rules; some limited exceptions apply. Players may hold more than one non-FIFA nationality.

No.	Pos.	Nation	Player
1	GK	GEQ	Miguel Ángel Óscar Eyama
2	DF	GEQ	Sergio Miguel Asumu
3	DF	GEQ	Ronaldo Ondo
4	DF	CGO	Reinelvi Massatou
5	DF	CIV	Moussa Kone
6	MF	CIV	Mamadou Diaby
8	MF	CMR	Jean Calvin Nyam Sonla
9	FW	CGO	Hugues Nababa
10	MF	CIV	Alou Diarra
11	FW	GEQ	José Esono

No.	Pos.	Nation	Player
12	DF	GEQ	Vidal Abaga
13	GK	GEQ	Hermógenes Nguema
14	DF	GEQ	Miguel Ángel Nzang (captain)
15	DF	GEQ	Tomás Nsue
16	FW	CIV	Stéphane Yapo
18	FW	CMR	René Nkotte
19	FW	CMR	Franck Guy Massoda
22	DF	GEQ	Rafael Nguema
25	MF	GEQ	José Luis Etoha
27	MF	GEQ	Julio Edu
