= Leones Vegetarianos FC =

Equatoguinean football club

Leones Vegetarianos
- Full name: Leones Vegetarianos Fútbol Club
- Founded: 20 July 2000; 24 years ago
- Ground: Estadio de Malabo; Malabo, Equatorial Guinea
- Capacity: 15,250
- Chairman: Bienvenido Ateba Mangue
- Head coach: Francisco Owono Elá
- League: Liga Nacional de Fútbol
- 2018: 1st
- Website: http://leonesvegetarianos.com
Home colours	Away colours

Leones Vegetarianos Fútbol Club is an Equatorial Guinean football club based in the city of Malabo. It currently plays in Equatoguinean first division. The club was founded as Vegetarianos CF by the Spaniard Juan Manuel Rojas, a vegetarian man from Granada who arrived in Equatorial Guinea in 2001 and years later went to India, where he staged a hunger strike. Its rival club is Atlético Semu.

== Achievements ==
- Equatoguinean Premier League: 2

2017, 2018.

- Equatoguinean Cup: 1

2014.

- Equatoguinean Super Cup: 0

== Performance in CAF competitions ==
- CAF Champions League: 2 appearances

2018 - Preliminary Round
2019 - Preliminary Round

- CAF Confederation Cup: 1 appearance

2015 - Preliminary Round
