= Equatoguinean Primera División =

Liga de Fútbol de Guinea Ecuatorial (LIFGE)
- Founded: 1979
- Country: Equatorial Guinea
- Confederation: CAF
- Number of clubs: 24
- Level on pyramid: 1
- Relegation to: Segunda División
- Domestic cup: Equatoguinean Cup
- International cup(s): Champions League; Confederation Cup
- Current champions: 15 de Agosto (1st title) (2025–26)
- Most championships: Sony de Elá Nguema (16 titles)
- Current: 2026-27

The Liga de Fútbol de Guinea Ecuatorial (LIFGE, formerly known as Liga Semiprofesional and Primera División de Honor) is the top division of the Equatoguinean football league system. It was founded in 1979.

Prior to independence, two separate leagues existed: One for Europeans, named the European League, and one for the locals named Liga Indigenas.

Since 2011, it has been a semi-professional league. Since the 2012 season, the tournament has no longer been divided into a league playing in Malabo and a league playing in Bata, but a single league, with clubs playing matches in seven stadiums across the country.

Many league games took place in front of hundreds of spectators.

== Clubs ==
=== Insular ===
- Atlético Semu
- Ceiba FC
- Cano Sport
- Deportivo Unidad
- Estrella Roja
- Leones Vegetarianos
- Real X Balompié
- Recreativo Lampert
- San Pablo de Nsork
- Santa María
- Sony Elá Nguema
- The Panthers

=== Continental ===
- 15 de Agosto
- AD Mongomo
- Akonangui
- Atlético Bata
- Deportivo Anoney
- Deportivo Mongomo
- Deportivo Niefang
- Dragón
- Fundación Bata
- Futuro Kings
- Racing de Micomeseng
- Unión Vesper

== 2023-24 Liguilla Nacional season ==
The final 2023-24 Liguilla Nacional standings:

| # | Football club | W | D | L | Pts |
|---|---|---|---|---|---|
| 1 | Deportivo Mongomo | 3 | 2 | 0 | 11 |
| 2 | 15 de Agosto | 2 | 3 | 0 | 9 |
| 3 | Deportivo Ebenezer | 2 | 1 | 2 | 7 |
| 4 | Cano Sport Academy | 2 | 0 | 3 | 6 |
| 5 | Atlético Semu FC | 2 | 0 | 3 | 6 |
| 6 | Fundación Bata | 0 | 2 | 3 | 2 |

== Previous winners ==
- 1979 : Real Rebola
- 1980 : Deportivo Mongomo
- 1981 : Atlético Malabo
- 1982 : Atlético Malabo
- 1983 : Dragón
- 1984 : Sony de Elá Nguema
- 1985 : Sony de Elá Nguema
- 1986 : Sony de Elá Nguema
- 1987 : Sony de Elá Nguema
- 1988 : Sony de Elá Nguema
- 1989 : Sony de Elá Nguema
- 1990 : Sony de Elá Nguema
- 1991 : Sony de Elá Nguema
- 1992 : Akonangui
- 1993 : Not known
- 1994 : Not known
- 1995 : Not known
- 1996 : Café Sportif
- 1997 : Deportivo Mongomo
- 1998 : Sony de Elá Nguema
- 1999 : Akonangui
- 2000 : Sony de Elá Nguema
- 2001 : Akonangui
- 2002 : Sony de Elá Nguema
- 2003 : Atlético Malabo
- 2004 : Renacimiento
- 2005 : Renacimiento
- 2006 : Renacimiento
- 2007 : Renacimiento
- 2008 : Akonangui
- 2009 : Sony de Elá Nguema
- 2010 : Deportivo Mongomo
- 2011 : Sony de Elá Nguema
- 2012 : Sony de Elá Nguema
- 2013 : Akonangui
- 2014 : Sony de Elá Nguema
- 2015 : Racing de Micomeseng
- 2015–16 : Sony de Elá Nguema
- 2017: Leones Vegetarianos
- 2018: Leones Vegetarianos
- 2018–19: Cano Sport
- 2019–20: Abandoned
- 2020–21: Not held
- 2021–22: Deportivo Mongomo
- 2022–23: Dragón
- 2023–24: Deportivo Mongomo
- 2024-25: Fundacion Bata

== Performance by clubs ==
| Club | City | Titles | Last title |
|---|---|---|---|
| Sony de Elá Nguema | Malabo | 16 | 2015–16 |
| Akonangui | Ebebiyín | 5 | 2013 |
| Deportivo Mongomo | Mongomo | 5 | 2023–24 |
| Renacimiento | Malabo | 4 | 2007 |
| Atlético Malabo | Malabo | 3 | 2003 |
| Leones Vegetarianos | Malabo | 2 | 2018 |
| Racing de Micomeseng | Micomeseng | 1 | 2015 |
| Café Sportif | Malabo | 1 | 1996 |
| Cano Sport | Malabo | 1 | 2018–19 |
| Dragón | Bata | 2 | 2022-2023 |
| Real Rebola | Rebola | 1 | 1979 |
| Fundacion Bata | Bata | 1 | 2025 |
