= Akonangui FC =

Equatoguinean football club

Akonangui
- Full name: Akonangui Fútbol Club
- Nickname(s): Equipo rojo de Kié-Ntem (Kie-Ntem red team)
- Ground: Estadio de Ebibeyin
- Capacity: 8,000
- Chairman: Ruslán Obiang
- Manager: Lassina Koné
- League: Equatoguinean Primera División

Akonangui Fútbol Club is an Equatoguinean football club based in the city of Ebibeyin.

It was dissolved in 2010, but returned for the 2012 season in Second Division, ascending to First Division next year.

== Honours ==
=== Domestic ===
- Equatoguinean Primera División: 5

1992, 1999, 2001, 2008, 2013.

- Equatoguinean Cup: 5

1979, 1996, 2002, 2007, 2019.

== Performance in CAF competitions ==
- CAF Champions League: 1 appearance

2022 - First Round
