= 2015 Africa Cup of Nations squads =

The 2015 Africa Cup of Nations was an international football tournament hosted by Equatorial Guinea from 17 January to 8 February 2015.

== Group A ==
=== Equatorial Guinea ===
Coach: (Argentina) Esteban Becker

The final squad was announced on 8 January 2015.

| No. | Pos. | Player | Date of birth (age) | Caps | Club |
|---|---|---|---|---|---|
| 1 | GK | Felipe Ovono | 26 July 1993 (aged 21) | 6 | (Equatorial Guinea) Deportivo Mongomo |
| 2 | DF | Dani Evuy | 11 March 1985 (aged 29) | 4 | Unattached |
| 3 | DF | Igor | 4 January 1995 (aged 20) | 0 | (Spain) Tropezón |
| 4 | DF | Rui | 28 May 1985 (aged 29) | 14 | (Malta) Hibernians |
| 5 | DF | Diosdado Mbele | 8 April 1997 (aged 17) | 7 | (Equatorial Guinea) Leones Vegetarianos |
| 6 | MF | Juvenal | 3 April 1979 (aged 35) | 24 | (Andorra) Santa Coloma |
| 7 | MF | Rubén Belima | 11 February 1992 (aged 22) | 1 | (Spain) Real Madrid Castilla |
| 8 | DF | Randy | 2 June 1987 (aged 27) | 19 | (Greece) Iraklis Psachna |
| 9 | FW | Raúl Fabiani | 23 February 1984 (aged 30) | 3 | (Spain) Olímpic Xàtiva |
| 10 | FW | Emilio Nsue (c) | 30 September 1989 (aged 25) | 2 | (England) Middlesbrough |
| 11 | MF | Javier Balboa | 13 May 1985 (aged 29) | 10 | (Portugal) Estoril |
| 12 | FW | Iván Bolado | 3 July 1989 (aged 25) | 7 | (India) Pune City |
| 13 | GK | Aitor Embela | 17 April 1996 (aged 18) | 0 | (Spain) Málaga (Juvenil A) |
| 14 | MF | Kike Boula | 17 July 1993 (aged 21) | 0 | (Spain) Mallorca B |
| 15 | MF | Ibán | 11 December 1995 (aged 19) | 0 | (Spain) Valencia Mestalla |
| 16 | DF | Sipo | 21 April 1988 (aged 26) | 16 | (Cyprus) AEK Larnaca |
| 17 | FW | Rubén Darío | 21 June 1993 (aged 21) | 0 | (Equatorial Guinea) Leones Vegetarianos |
| 18 | MF | Viera Ellong | 14 June 1987 (aged 27) | 8 | (Equatorial Guinea) The Panthers |
| 19 | MF | Charly | 18 February 1985 (aged 29) | 0 | (Gibraltar) College Europa |
| 20 | DF | Miguel Ángel | 8 December 1990 (aged 24) | 0 | (Equatorial Guinea) Akonangui |
| 21 | MF | Iván Zarandona | 30 August 1980 (aged 34) | 14 | (Hong Kong) Biu Chun Rangers |
| 22 | MF | Pablo Ganet | 4 November 1994 (aged 20) | 0 | (Spain) San Sebastián de los Reyes |
| 23 | GK | Carlos Mosibe | 12 March 1991 (aged 23) | 0 | (Equatorial Guinea) Atlético Malabo |

=== Burkina Faso ===
Coach: (Belgium) Paul Put

A 24-man provisional squad was announced on 23 December 2014.

| No. | Pos. | Player | Date of birth (age) | Caps | Club |
|---|---|---|---|---|---|
| 1 | GK | Moussa Fofana | 31 July 1992 (aged 22) | 0 | (Burkina Faso) Kadiogo |
| 2 | DF | Steeve Yago | 16 December 1992 (aged 22) | 13 | (France) Toulouse |
| 3 | MF | Moussa Yedan | 20 July 1989 (aged 25) | 4 | (Egypt) Al Ahly |
| 4 | DF | Bakary Koné | 27 April 1988 (aged 26) | 48 | (France) Lyon |
| 5 | DF | Mohamed Koffi | 30 December 1986 (aged 28) | 44 | (Egypt) Zamalek |
| 6 | MF | Djakaridja Koné | 22 July 1986 (aged 28) | 30 | (France) Evian |
| 7 | MF | Florent Rouamba | 31 December 1986 (aged 28) | 48 | (France) CA Bastia |
| 8 | DF | Paul Koulibaly | 24 March 1986 (aged 28) | 48 | (Guinea) Horoya |
| 9 | DF | Issa Gouo | 9 September 1989 (aged 25) | 11 | (Guinea) Kaloum Star |
| 10 | MF | Alain Traoré | 31 December 1988 (aged 26) | 33 | (France) Lorient |
| 11 | MF | Jonathan Pitroipa | 12 April 1986 (aged 28) | 52 | (United Arab Emirates) Al-Jazira |
| 12 | MF | Adama Guira | 24 April 1988 (aged 26) | 2 | (Denmark) SønderjyskE |
| 13 | DF | Narcisse Bambara | 23 June 1989 (aged 25) | 11 | (Romania) Universitatea Cluj |
| 14 | DF | Wilfried Balima | 20 March 1985 (aged 29) | 24 | (Moldova) Sheriff Tiraspol |
| 15 | FW | Aristide Bancé | 19 September 1984 (aged 30) | 44 | (Finland) HJK |
| 16 | GK | Abdoulaye Soulama | 29 November 1979 (aged 35) | 44 | (Ghana) Hearts of Oak |
| 17 | MF | Jonathan Zongo | 6 April 1989 (aged 25) | 13 | (Spain) Almería |
| 18 | MF | Charles Kaboré (c) | 9 February 1988 (aged 26) | 58 | (Russia) Kuban Krasnodar |
| 19 | MF | Bertrand Traoré | 6 September 1995 (aged 19) | 17 | (Netherlands) Vitesse |
| 20 | FW | Issiaka Ouédraogo | 19 August 1988 (aged 26) | 16 | (Austria) Admira Wacker Mödling |
| 21 | FW | Abdou Traoré | 28 December 1988 (aged 26) | 23 | (Turkey) Kardemir Karabükspor |
| 22 | MF | Prejuce Nakoulma | 21 April 1987 (aged 27) | 21 | (Turkey) Mersin İdmanyurdu |
| 23 | GK | Germain Sanou | 26 May 1992 (aged 22) | 15 | (France) Beauvais |

=== Gabon ===
Coach: (Portugal) Jorge Costa

The final squad was announced on 28 December 2014.

| No. | Pos. | Player | Date of birth (age) | Caps | Club |
|---|---|---|---|---|---|
| 1 | GK | Didier Ovono | 23 January 1983 (aged 31) | 73 | (Belgium) Oostende |
| 2 | DF | Aaron Appindangoyé | 2 February 1992 (aged 22) | 16 | (Gabon) Mounana |
| 3 | FW | Johann Lengoualama | 29 September 1992 (aged 22) | 8 | (Morocco) Difaâ El Jadidi |
| 4 | DF | Yrondu Musavu-King | 8 January 1992 (aged 23) | 7 | (France) Caen |
| 5 | DF | Bruno Ecuele Manga | 16 July 1988 (aged 26) | 44 | (Wales) Cardiff City |
| 6 | DF | Johann Obiang | 5 July 1993 (aged 21) | 4 | (France) Châteauroux |
| 7 | FW | Malick Evouna | 28 November 1992 (aged 22) | 9 | (Morocco) Wydad Casablanca |
| 8 | DF | Lloyd Palun | 28 November 1988 (aged 26) | 23 | (France) Nice |
| 9 | FW | Pierre-Emerick Aubameyang (c) | 18 June 1989 (aged 25) | 38 | (Germany) Borussia Dortmund |
| 10 | MF | Frédéric Bulot | 27 September 1990 (aged 24) | 7 | (England) Charlton Athletic |
| 11 | MF | Lévy Madinda | 11 June 1992 (aged 22) | 26 | (Spain) Celta Vigo |
| 12 | MF | Guélor Kanga | 1 September 1990 (aged 24) | 13 | (Russia) Rostov |
| 13 | MF | Samson Mbingui | 9 February 1992 (aged 22) | 14 | (Algeria) MC El Eulma |
| 14 | DF | Randal Oto'o | 23 May 1994 (aged 20) | 4 | (Portugal) Braga |
| 15 | DF | Henri Junior Ndong | 23 August 1992 (aged 22) | 8 | (France) Auxerre |
| 16 | GK | Anthony Mfa Mezui | 7 March 1991 (aged 23) | 1 | (France) Metz |
| 17 | MF | André Biyogo Poko | 7 March 1993 (aged 21) | 26 | (France) Bordeaux |
| 18 | MF | Alexander N'Doumbou | 4 January 1992 (aged 23) | 6 | (France) Marseille B |
| 19 | DF | Benjamin Zé Ondo | 18 June 1987 (aged 27) | 7 | (Algeria) ES Sétif |
| 20 | FW | Bonaventure Sokambi | 29 January 1991 (aged 23) | 9 | (Algeria) ASO Chlef |
| 21 | MF | Romaric Rogombé | 25 November 1990 (aged 24) | 15 | (Republic of the Congo) Léopards |
| 22 | MF | Didier Ibrahim N'Dong | 17 June 1994 (aged 20) | 10 | (France) Lorient |
| 23 | GK | Yves Bitséki | 23 April 1983 (aged 31) | 12 | (Gabon) Bitam |

=== Congo ===
Coach: (France) Claude Le Roy

A 26-man provisional squad was announced on 22 December 2014. The final squad was announced on 7 January 2015.

| No. | Pos. | Player | Date of birth (age) | Caps | Club |
|---|---|---|---|---|---|
| 1 | GK | Christoffer Mafoumbi | 3 March 1994 (aged 20) | 4 | (France) Le Pontet |
| 2 | DF | Francis N'Ganga | 16 June 1985 (aged 29) | 31 | (Belgium) Charleroi |
| 3 | DF | Igor N'Ganga | 14 April 1987 (aged 27) | 13 | (Switzerland) Aarau |
| 4 | DF | Boris Moubhio | 25 October 1988 (aged 26) | 16 | (Republic of the Congo) Léopards |
| 5 | DF | Arnold Bouka Moutou | 28 November 1988 (aged 26) | 6 | (France) Angers |
| 6 | DF | Dimitri Bissiki | 17 March 1991 (aged 23) | 13 | (Republic of the Congo) Léopards |
| 7 | MF | Prince Oniangue (c) | 4 November 1988 (aged 26) | 24 | (France) Reims |
| 8 | MF | Delvin N'Dinga | 14 March 1988 (aged 26) | 34 | (Greece) Olympiacos |
| 9 | FW | Silvère Ganvoula | 22 June 1996 (aged 18) | 4 | (Morocco) Raja Casablanca |
| 10 | FW | Férébory Doré | 21 January 1989 (aged 25) | 19 | (Romania) CFR Cluj |
| 11 | FW | Fabrice Ondama | 27 February 1988 (aged 26) | 20 | (Morocco) Wydad Casablanca |
| 12 | MF | Francis Litsingi | 10 September 1986 (aged 28) | 7 | (Czech Republic) Teplice |
| 13 | FW | Thievy Bifouma | 13 May 1992 (aged 22) | 8 | (Spain) Almería |
| 14 | MF | Césaire Gandzé | 6 March 1989 (aged 25) | 19 | (Republic of the Congo) Léopards |
| 15 | FW | Ladislas Douniama | 24 May 1986 (aged 28) | 26 | (France) Guingamp |
| 16 | GK | Chancel Massa | 28 August 1985 (aged 29) | 12 | (Republic of the Congo) Léopards |
| 17 | MF | Chris Malonga | 11 July 1987 (aged 27) | 18 | (Switzerland) Lausanne |
| 18 | DF | Marvin Baudry | 26 January 1990 (aged 24) | 7 | (France) Amiens |
| 19 | FW | Dominique Malonga | 8 January 1989 (aged 26) | 2 | (Scotland) Hibernian |
| 20 | MF | Hardy Binguila | 17 July 1996 (aged 18) | 7 | (Republic of the Congo) Diables Noirs |
| 21 | MF | Sagesse Babélé | 13 February 1993 (aged 21) | 5 | (Republic of the Congo) Léopards |
| 22 | GK | Pavelh Ndzila | 12 January 1995 (aged 20) | 0 | (Republic of the Congo) Étoile du Congo |
| 23 | DF | Atoni Mavoungou | 22 December 1996 (aged 18) | 0 | (Republic of the Congo) ACNFF |

== Group B ==
=== Zambia ===
Coach: (Zambia) Honour Janza

A 27-man provisional squad was announced on 24 December 2014. The final squad was announced on 7 January 2015.

| No. | Pos. | Player | Date of birth (age) | Caps | Club |
|---|---|---|---|---|---|
| 1 | GK | Danny Munyao | 21 January 1987 (aged 27) | 10 | (Zambia) Red Arrows |
| 2 | DF | Donashano Malama | 1 July 1987 (aged 27) | 6 | (Zambia) Nkana |
| 3 | MF | Chisamba Lungu | 31 January 1991 (aged 23) | 32 | (Russia) Ural Sverdlovsk Oblast |
| 4 | DF | Christopher Munthali | 2 February 1991 (aged 23) | 18 | (Zambia) Nkana |
| 5 | DF | Roderick Kabwe | 30 November 1992 (aged 22) | 12 | (Zambia) Zanaco |
| 6 | DF | Davies Nkausu | 1 January 1986 (aged 29) | 25 | (South Africa) Bloemfontein Celtic |
| 7 | MF | Spencer Sautu | 5 October 1994 (aged 20) | 1 | (Zambia) Green Eagles |
| 8 | MF | Bruce Musakanya | 25 September 1993 (aged 21) | 14 | (Zambia) Red Arrows |
| 9 | FW | Ronald Kampamba | 26 May 1994 (aged 20) | 11 | (Zambia) Nkana |
| 10 | MF | Mukuka Mulenga | 6 July 1993 (aged 21) | 16 | (South Africa) Bloemfontein Celtic |
| 11 | MF | Lubambo Musonda | 5 May 1995 (aged 19) | 4 | (Armenia) Ulisses |
| 12 | FW | Evans Kangwa | 21 June 1994 (aged 20) | 7 | (Israel) Hapoel Ra'anana |
| 13 | DF | Stoppila Sunzu | 22 June 1989 (aged 25) | 47 | (China) Shanghai Greenland Shenhua |
| 14 | MF | Kondwani Mtonga | 14 June 1986 (aged 28) | 20 | (India) Shillong Lajong |
| 15 | FW | Given Singuluma | 11 July 1986 (aged 28) | 25 | (Democratic Republic of the Congo) Mazembe |
| 16 | GK | Kennedy Mweene | 12 November 1984 (aged 30) | 89 | (South Africa) Mamelodi Sundowns |
| 17 | MF | Rainford Kalaba (c) | 14 August 1986 (aged 28) | 77 | (Democratic Republic of the Congo) Mazembe |
| 18 | DF | Emmanuel Mbola | 10 May 1993 (aged 21) | 42 | (Israel) Hapoel Ra'anana |
| 19 | MF | Nathan Sinkala | 23 April 1991 (aged 23) | 31 | (Switzerland) Grasshopper |
| 20 | FW | Emmanuel Mayuka | 21 November 1990 (aged 24) | 54 | (England) Southampton |
| 21 | FW | Jackson Mwanza | 6 February 1987 (aged 27) | 3 | (Zambia) ZESCO United |
| 22 | GK | Joshua Titima | 20 October 1992 (aged 22) | 5 | (Zambia) Power Dynamos |
| 23 | FW | Patrick Ngoma | 21 May 1997 (aged 17) | 0 | (Zambia) Red Arrows |

=== Tunisia ===
Coach: (Belgium) Georges Leekens

A 26-man provisional squad was announced on 27 December 2014. The final squad was announced on 7 January 2015.

| No. | Pos. | Player | Date of birth (age) | Caps | Club |
|---|---|---|---|---|---|
| 1 | GK | Farouk Ben Mustapha | 1 July 1989 (aged 25) | 10 | (Tunisia) Club Africain |
| 2 | DF | Syam Ben Youssef | 31 March 1989 (aged 25) | 12 | (Romania) Astra Giurgiu |
| 3 | DF | Aymen Abdennour | 6 August 1989 (aged 25) | 36 | (France) Monaco |
| 4 | DF | Bilel Mohsni | 21 July 1987 (aged 27) | 4 | (Scotland) Rangers |
| 5 | DF | Rami Bedoui | 19 January 1990 (aged 24) | 4 | (Tunisia) ES Sahel |
| 6 | MF | Hocine Ragued | 11 February 1983 (aged 31) | 47 | (Tunisia) ES Tunis |
| 7 | MF | Youssef Msakni | 28 October 1990 (aged 24) | 28 | (Qatar) Lekhwiya |
| 8 | FW | Edem Rjaïbi | 5 April 1994 (aged 20) | 0 | (Tunisia) CA Bizertin |
| 9 | MF | Yassine Chikhaoui (c) | 22 September 1986 (aged 28) | 33 | (Switzerland) Zürich |
| 10 | FW | Hamza Younés | 16 April 1986 (aged 28) | 7 | (Bulgaria) Ludogorets Razgrad |
| 11 | FW | Amine Chermiti | 26 December 1987 (aged 27) | 36 | (Switzerland) Zürich |
| 12 | DF | Ali Maâloul | 1 January 1990 (aged 25) | 9 | (Tunisia) CS Sfaxien |
| 13 | MF | Ferjani Sassi | 18 March 1992 (aged 22) | 11 | (France) Metz |
| 14 | MF | Stéphane Nater | 20 January 1984 (aged 30) | 9 | (Tunisia) Club Africain |
| 15 | MF | Mohamed Ali Manser | 28 April 1991 (aged 23) | 1 | (Tunisia) CS Sfaxien |
| 16 | GK | Aymen Mathlouthi | 14 September 1984 (aged 30) | 43 | (Tunisia) ES Sahel |
| 17 | DF | Hamza Mathlouthi | 25 May 1992 (aged 22) | 9 | (Tunisia) CA Bizertin |
| 18 | MF | Wahbi Khazri | 8 February 1991 (aged 23) | 13 | (France) Bordeaux |
| 19 | FW | Ahmed Akaïchi | 23 February 1989 (aged 25) | 7 | (Tunisia) ES Tunis |
| 20 | DF | Mohamed Ali Yacoubi | 5 October 1990 (aged 24) | 3 | (Tunisia) ES Tunis |
| 21 | MF | Jamel Saihi | 27 January 1987 (aged 27) | 16 | (France) Montpellier |
| 22 | GK | Moez Ben Cherifia | 24 June 1991 (aged 23) | 12 | (Tunisia) ES Tunis |
| 23 | DF | Selim Ben Djemia | 29 January 1989 (aged 25) | 2 | (France) Laval |

=== Cape Verde ===
Coach: (Portugal) Rui Águas

The final squad was announced on 24 December 2014.

| No. | Pos. | Player | Date of birth (age) | Caps | Club |
|---|---|---|---|---|---|
| 1 | GK | Vozinha | 3 June 1986 (aged 28) | 19 | (Angola) Progresso |
| 2 | DF | Stopira | 20 May 1988 (aged 26) | 15 | (Hungary) Videoton |
| 3 | DF | Fernando Varela | 26 November 1987 (aged 27) | 33 | (Romania) Steaua București |
| 4 | DF | Kay | 5 January 1988 (aged 27) | 6 | (Romania) Universitatea Craiova |
| 5 | MF | Babanco (c) | 27 July 1985 (aged 29) | 40 | (Portugal) Estoril |
| 6 | MF | Sérgio Semedo | 23 February 1988 (aged 26) | 1 | (Portugal) Olhanense |
| 7 | MF | Odaïr Fortes | 31 March 1987 (aged 27) | 18 | (France) Reims |
| 8 | MF | Toni Varela | 13 June 1986 (aged 28) | 24 | (Netherlands) Excelsior |
| 9 | MF | Kuca | 2 August 1989 (aged 25) | 7 | (Portugal) Estoril |
| 10 | MF | Héldon | 14 November 1988 (aged 26) | 32 | (Portugal) Sporting CP |
| 11 | MF | Garry Rodrigues | 27 November 1990 (aged 24) | 8 | (Spain) Elche |
| 12 | GK | Ken | 6 June 1994 (aged 20) | 1 | (Portugal) Nacional |
| 13 | MF | Platini | 16 April 1986 (aged 28) | 13 | (Bulgaria) CSKA Sofia |
| 14 | DF | Gegé | 24 February 1988 (aged 26) | 20 | (Portugal) Marítimo |
| 15 | MF | Nuno Rocha | 25 March 1992 (aged 22) | 5 | (Romania) Universitatea Craiova |
| 16 | GK | Ivan Cruz | 3 May 1996 (aged 18) | 0 | (Portugal) Gil Vicente |
| 17 | MF | Calú | 20 September 1983 (aged 31) | 12 | (Angola) Progresso |
| 18 | DF | Nivaldo | 10 July 1988 (aged 26) | 19 | (Czech Republic) Teplice |
| 19 | FW | Júlio Tavares | 19 November 1988 (aged 26) | 11 | (France) Dijon |
| 20 | FW | Ryan Mendes | 8 January 1990 (aged 25) | 20 | (France) Lille |
| 21 | FW | Djaniny | 21 March 1991 (aged 23) | 18 | (Mexico) Santos Laguna |
| 22 | DF | Jeffrey Fortes | 22 March 1989 (aged 25) | 3 | (Netherlands) Dordrecht |
| 23 | DF | Carlitos | 23 April 1985 (aged 29) | 19 | (Cyprus) AEL Limassol |

=== DR Congo ===
Coach: (Democratic Republic of the Congo) Florent Ibengé

A 29-man provisional squad was announced on 29 December 2014.

| No. | Pos. | Player | Date of birth (age) | Caps | Club |
|---|---|---|---|---|---|
| 1 | GK | Robert Kidiaba | 1 February 1976 (aged 38) | 53 | (Democratic Republic of the Congo) Mazembe |
| 2 | DF | Issama Mpeko | 3 March 1986 (aged 28) | 31 | (Angola) Kabuscorp |
| 3 | DF | Jean Kasusula | 5 August 1986 (aged 28) | 34 | (Democratic Republic of the Congo) Mazembe |
| 4 | DF | Christopher Oualembo | 31 January 1987 (aged 27) | 5 | (Portugal) Académica de Coimbra |
| 5 | MF | Nelson Munganga | 27 July 1993 (aged 21) | 2 | (Democratic Republic of the Congo) Vita Club |
| 6 | MF | Cédric Makiadi | 23 February 1984 (aged 30) | 22 | (Germany) Werder Bremen |
| 7 | MF | Youssouf Mulumbu (c) | 25 January 1987 (aged 27) | 25 | (England) West Bromwich Albion |
| 8 | MF | Hervé Kage | 10 April 1989 (aged 25) | 2 | (Belgium) Genk |
| 9 | FW | Dieumerci Mbokani | 22 November 1985 (aged 29) | 25 | (Ukraine) Dynamo Kyiv |
| 10 | MF | Neeskens Kebano | 10 March 1992 (aged 22) | 3 | (Belgium) Charleroi |
| 11 | MF | Yannick Bolasie | 24 May 1989 (aged 25) | 10 | (England) Crystal Palace |
| 12 | DF | Bawaka Mabele | 9 June 1988 (aged 26) | 5 | (Democratic Republic of the Congo) Vita Club |
| 13 | FW | Junior Kabananga | 4 April 1989 (aged 25) | 4 | (Belgium) Cercle Brugge |
| 14 | DF | Gabriel Zakuani | 31 May 1986 (aged 28) | 8 | (England) Peterborough United |
| 15 | DF | Joël Kimwaki | 14 October 1986 (aged 28) | 33 | (Democratic Republic of the Congo) Mazembe |
| 16 | GK | Mulopo Kudimbana | 21 January 1987 (aged 27) | 4 | (Belgium) Anderlecht |
| 17 | DF | Cédric Mongongu | 22 June 1989 (aged 25) | 30 | (France) Evian |
| 18 | MF | Cedrick Mabwati | 8 March 1992 (aged 22) | 7 | (Spain) Osasuna |
| 19 | FW | Jeremy Bokila | 14 November 1988 (aged 26) | 7 | (Russia) Terek Grozny |
| 20 | MF | Lema Mabidi | 11 June 1993 (aged 21) | 16 | (Democratic Republic of the Congo) Vita Club |
| 21 | FW | Firmin Ndombe Mubele | 17 April 1994 (aged 20) | 14 | (Democratic Republic of the Congo) Vita Club |
| 22 | DF | Chancel Mbemba Mangulu | 8 August 1994 (aged 20) | 8 | (Belgium) Anderlecht |
| 23 | GK | Parfait Mandanda | 10 October 1989 (aged 25) | 7 | (Belgium) Charleroi |

== Group C ==
=== Ghana ===
Coach: (Israel) Avram Grant

A 31-man provisional squad was announced on 24 December 2014. The final squad was announced on 7 January 2015.

| No. | Pos. | Player | Date of birth (age) | Caps | Club |
|---|---|---|---|---|---|
| 1 | GK | Brimah Razak | 22 June 1987 (aged 27) | 4 | (Spain) Mirandés |
| 2 | FW | Kwesi Appiah | 12 August 1990 (aged 24) | 0 | (England) Cambridge United |
| 3 | FW | Asamoah Gyan (c) | 22 November 1985 (aged 29) | 86 | (United Arab Emirates) Al-Ain |
| 4 | DF | Edwin Gyimah | 9 March 1991 (aged 23) | 5 | (South Africa) Mpumalanga Black Aces |
| 5 | DF | Mohamed Awal | 1 May 1988 (aged 26) | 4 | (South Africa) Maritzburg United |
| 6 | MF | Afriyie Acquah | 5 January 1992 (aged 23) | 8 | (Italy) Parma |
| 7 | MF | Christian Atsu | 10 January 1992 (aged 23) | 31 | (England) Everton |
| 8 | MF | Emmanuel Agyemang-Badu | 2 December 1990 (aged 24) | 55 | (Italy) Udinese |
| 9 | FW | Jordan Ayew | 11 September 1991 (aged 23) | 21 | (France) Lorient |
| 10 | FW | André Ayew | 17 December 1989 (aged 25) | 57 | (France) Marseille |
| 11 | MF | Mubarak Wakaso | 25 July 1990 (aged 24) | 25 | (Scotland) Celtic |
| 12 | GK | Ernest Sowah | 31 March 1988 (aged 26) | 1 | (Democratic Republic of the Congo) Don Bosco |
| 13 | MF | Mohammed Rabiu | 31 December 1989 (aged 25) | 26 | (Russia) Kuban Krasnodar |
| 14 | MF | Solomon Asante | 15 September 1990 (aged 24) | 16 | (Democratic Republic of the Congo) Mazembe |
| 15 | FW | Mahatma Otoo | 6 February 1992 (aged 22) | 3 | (Norway) Sogndal |
| 16 | GK | Fatau Dauda | 6 April 1985 (aged 29) | 21 | (Ghana) Ashanti Gold |
| 17 | DF | Baba Rahman | 2 July 1994 (aged 20) | 5 | (Germany) FC Augsburg |
| 18 | DF | Daniel Amartey | 21 December 1994 (aged 20) | 0 | (Denmark) Copenhagen |
| 19 | DF | Jonathan Mensah | 13 July 1990 (aged 24) | 38 | (France) Evian |
| 20 | FW | David Accam | 28 September 1990 (aged 24) | 0 | (United States) Chicago Fire |
| 21 | DF | John Boye | 23 April 1987 (aged 27) | 36 | (Turkey) Kayseri Erciyesspor |
| 22 | MF | Frank Acheampong | 16 October 1993 (aged 21) | 2 | (Belgium) Anderlecht |
| 23 | DF | Harrison Afful | 24 June 1986 (aged 28) | 49 | (Tunisia) ES Tunis |

=== Algeria ===
Coach: (France) Christian Gourcuff

The final squad was announced on 16 December 2014.

| No. | Pos. | Player | Date of birth (age) | Caps | Club |
|---|---|---|---|---|---|
| 1 | GK | Azzedine Doukha | 5 August 1986 (aged 28) | 5 | (Algeria) JS Kabylie |
| 2 | DF | Madjid Bougherra (c) | 7 October 1982 (aged 32) | 66 | (United Arab Emirates) Al-Fujairah |
| 3 | DF | Faouzi Ghoulam | 1 February 1991 (aged 23) | 12 | (Italy) Napoli |
| 4 | DF | Cadamuro Bentaïba | 5 March 1988 (aged 26) | 8 | (Spain) Osasuna |
| 5 | DF | Rafik Halliche | 2 September 1986 (aged 28) | 35 | Qatar |
| 6 | DF | Djamel Mesbah | 9 October 1984 (aged 30) | 33 | (Italy) Sampdoria |
| 7 | FW | Riyad Mahrez | 21 February 1991 (aged 23) | 9 | (England) Leicester City |
| 8 | MF | Mehdi Lacen | 15 May 1984 (aged 30) | 38 | (Spain) Getafe |
| 9 | FW | Ishak Belfodil | 12 January 1992 (aged 23) | 5 | (Italy) Parma |
| 10 | MF | Sofiane Feghouli | 26 December 1989 (aged 25) | 29 | (Spain) Valencia |
| 11 | MF | Yacine Brahimi | 8 February 1990 (aged 24) | 15 | (Portugal) Porto |
| 12 | DF | Carl Medjani | 15 May 1985 (aged 29) | 35 | (Turkey) Trabzonspor |
| 13 | FW | Islam Slimani | 18 June 1988 (aged 26) | 30 | (Portugal) Sporting CP |
| 14 | MF | Nabil Bentaleb | 24 November 1994 (aged 20) | 9 | (England) Tottenham Hotspur |
| 15 | FW | Hillal Soudani | 25 November 1987 (aged 27) | 28 | (Croatia) Dinamo Zagreb |
| 16 | GK | Cédric Si Mohamed | 9 January 1985 (aged 30) | 1 | (Algeria) CS Constantine |
| 17 | MF | Foued Kadir | 5 December 1983 (aged 31) | 23 | (Spain) Real Betis |
| 18 | MF | Abdelmoumene Djabou | 31 January 1987 (aged 27) | 12 | (Tunisia) Club Africain |
| 19 | MF | Saphir Taïder | 29 February 1992 (aged 22) | 19 | (Italy) Sassuolo |
| 20 | DF | Aïssa Mandi | 22 October 1991 (aged 23) | 10 | (France) Reims |
| 21 | MF | Ahmed Kashi | 18 November 1988 (aged 26) | 0 | (France) Metz |
| 22 | DF | Mehdi Zeffane | 19 May 1992 (aged 22) | 1 | (France) Lyon |
| 23 | GK | Raïs M'Bolhi | 25 April 1986 (aged 28) | 36 | (United States) Philadelphia Union |

=== South Africa ===
Coach: (South Africa) Ephraim Mashaba

A 34-man provisional squad was announced on 18 December 2014, before the final list announcement on 30 December.

| No. | Pos. | Player | Date of birth (age) | Caps | Club |
|---|---|---|---|---|---|
| 1 | GK | Darren Keet | 5 August 1989 (aged 25) | 4 | (Belgium) Kortrijk |
| 2 | DF | Rivaldo Coetzee | 16 October 1996 (aged 18) | 5 | (South Africa) Ajax Cape Town |
| 3 | DF | Eric Mathoho | 1 March 1990 (aged 24) | 16 | (South Africa) Kaizer Chiefs |
| 4 | DF | Siyabonga Nhlapo | 23 December 1988 (aged 26) | 2 | (South Africa) Bidvest Wits |
| 5 | MF | Andile Jali | 10 April 1990 (aged 24) | 21 | (Belgium) Oostende |
| 6 | DF | Anele Ngcongca | 20 October 1987 (aged 27) | 41 | (Belgium) Genk |
| 7 | FW | Mandla Masango | 18 July 1989 (aged 25) | 9 | (South Africa) Kaizer Chiefs |
| 8 | MF | Bongani Zungu | 9 October 1992 (aged 22) | 9 | (South Africa) Mamelodi Sundowns |
| 9 | FW | Bongani Ndulula | 29 November 1989 (aged 25) | 6 | (South Africa) AmaZulu |
| 10 | MF | Sibusiso Vilakazi | 29 December 1989 (aged 25) | 10 | (South Africa) Bidvest Wits |
| 11 | DF | Thabo Matlaba | 13 December 1987 (aged 27) | 15 | (South Africa) Orlando Pirates |
| 12 | MF | Reneilwe Letsholonyane | 9 June 1982 (aged 32) | 52 | (South Africa) Kaizer Chiefs |
| 13 | MF | Thamsanqa Sangweni | 26 May 1989 (aged 25) | 2 | (South Africa) Chippa United |
| 14 | DF | Thulani Hlatshwayo | 18 December 1989 (aged 25) | 12 | (South Africa) Bidvest Wits |
| 15 | MF | Dean Furman (c) | 22 June 1988 (aged 26) | 25 | (England) Doncaster Rovers |
| 16 | GK | Nhlanhla Khuzwayo | 9 February 1990 (aged 24) | 3 | (South Africa) Kaizer Chiefs |
| 17 | MF | Bernard Parker | 16 March 1986 (aged 28) | 70 | (South Africa) Kaizer Chiefs |
| 18 | FW | Thuso Phala | 27 May 1986 (aged 28) | 15 | (South Africa) SuperSport United |
| 19 | MF | Themba Zwane | 3 August 1989 (aged 25) | 6 | (South Africa) Mamelodi Sundowns |
| 20 | MF | Oupa Manyisa | 30 July 1988 (aged 26) | 20 | (South Africa) Orlando Pirates |
| 21 | DF | Ayanda Gcaba | 8 March 1986 (aged 28) | 1 | (South Africa) Orlando Pirates |
| 22 | GK | Jackson Mabokgwane | 19 January 1988 (aged 26) | 1 | (South Africa) Mpumalanga Black Aces |
| 23 | FW | Tokelo Rantie | 8 September 1990 (aged 24) | 27 | (England) AFC Bournemouth |

=== Senegal ===
Coach: (France) Alain Giresse

A 28-man provisional squad was announced on 26 December 2014. The final squad was announced on 7 January 2015.

| No. | Pos. | Player | Date of birth (age) | Caps | Club |
|---|---|---|---|---|---|
| 1 | GK | Bouna Coundoul (c) | 4 March 1982 (aged 32) | 24 | (Cyprus) Ethnikos Achna |
| 2 | DF | Kara Mbodj | 11 November 1989 (aged 25) | 12 | (Belgium) Genk |
| 3 | DF | Papy Djilobodji | 12 January 1988 (aged 27) | 9 | (France) Nantes |
| 4 | MF | Alfred N'Diaye | 6 March 1990 (aged 24) | 7 | (Spain) Real Betis |
| 5 | MF | Papakouli Diop | 19 March 1986 (aged 28) | 9 | (Spain) Levante |
| 6 | DF | Lamine Sané | 22 March 1987 (aged 27) | 21 | (France) Bordeaux |
| 7 | FW | Moussa Sow | 19 January 1986 (aged 28) | 28 | (Turkey) Fenerbahçe |
| 8 | MF | Cheikhou Kouyaté | 21 December 1989 (aged 25) | 12 | (England) West Ham United |
| 9 | FW | Mame Biram Diouf | 16 December 1987 (aged 27) | 23 | (England) Stoke City |
| 10 | FW | Sadio Mané | 10 April 1992 (aged 22) | 19 | (England) Southampton |
| 11 | FW | Dame N'Doye | 21 February 1985 (aged 29) | 23 | (Russia) Lokomotiv Moscow |
| 12 | MF | Stéphane Badji | 29 May 1990 (aged 24) | 13 | (Norway) Brann |
| 13 | DF | Cheikh M'Bengue | 23 July 1988 (aged 26) | 15 | (France) Rennes |
| 14 | DF | Zargo Touré | 11 November 1989 (aged 25) | 6 | (France) Le Havre |
| 15 | FW | Papiss Cissé | 3 June 1985 (aged 29) | 31 | (England) Newcastle United |
| 16 | GK | Lys Gomis | 6 October 1989 (aged 25) | 1 | (Italy) Trapani |
| 17 | MF | Idrissa Gueye | 26 September 1989 (aged 25) | 19 | (France) Lille |
| 18 | DF | Pape Souaré | 6 June 1990 (aged 24) | 11 | (France) Lille |
| 19 | FW | Moussa Konaté | 3 April 1993 (aged 21) | 8 | (Switzerland) Sion |
| 20 | DF | Salif Sané | 25 August 1990 (aged 24) | 7 | (Germany) Hannover 96 |
| 21 | DF | Lamine Gassama | 20 October 1989 (aged 25) | 7 | (France) Lorient |
| 22 | MF | Henri Saivet | 26 October 1990 (aged 24) | 4 | (France) Bordeaux |
| 23 | GK | Papa Demba Camara | 16 January 1993 (aged 22) | 1 | (France) Sochaux |

== Group D ==
=== Ivory Coast ===
Coach: (France) Hervé Renard

The final squad was announced on 29 December 2014.

| No. | Pos. | Player | Date of birth (age) | Caps | Club |
|---|---|---|---|---|---|
| 1 | GK | Boubacar Barry | 30 December 1979 (aged 35) | 83 | (Belgium) Lokeren |
| 2 | DF | Ousmane Viera | 21 December 1986 (aged 28) | 5 | (Turkey) Çaykur Rizespor |
| 3 | FW | Roger Assalé | 13 November 1993 (aged 21) | 2 | (Democratic Republic of the Congo) Mazembe |
| 4 | DF | Kolo Touré | 19 March 1981 (aged 33) | 109 | (England) Liverpool |
| 5 | DF | Siaka Tiéné | 22 February 1982 (aged 32) | 87 | (France) Montpellier |
| 6 | MF | Cheick Doukouré | 11 September 1992 (aged 22) | 0 | (France) Metz |
| 7 | FW | Seydou Doumbia | 31 December 1987 (aged 27) | 22 | (Russia) CSKA Moscow |
| 8 | FW | Salomon Kalou | 5 August 1985 (aged 29) | 69 | (Germany) Hertha BSC |
| 9 | MF | Cheick Tioté | 21 June 1986 (aged 28) | 48 | (England) Newcastle United |
| 10 | FW | Gervinho | 27 May 1987 (aged 27) | 60 | (Italy) Roma |
| 11 | FW | Junior Tallo | 21 December 1992 (aged 22) | 2 | (France) Bastia |
| 12 | FW | Wilfried Bony | 10 December 1988 (aged 26) | 32 | (Wales) Swansea City |
| 13 | MF | Akpa Akpro | 11 October 1992 (aged 22) | 4 | (France) Toulouse |
| 14 | MF | Ismaël Diomandé | 28 August 1992 (aged 22) | 5 | (France) Saint-Étienne |
| 15 | MF | Max Gradel | 30 November 1987 (aged 27) | 32 | (France) Saint-Étienne |
| 16 | GK | Sylvain Gbohouo | 29 October 1988 (aged 26) | 4 | (Ivory Coast) Séwé Sport |
| 17 | DF | Serge Aurier | 24 December 1992 (aged 22) | 17 | (France) Paris Saint-Germain |
| 18 | FW | Lacina Traoré | 20 May 1990 (aged 24) | 10 | (France) Monaco |
| 19 | MF | Yaya Touré (c) | 13 May 1983 (aged 31) | 88 | (England) Manchester City |
| 20 | MF | Serey Dié | 7 November 1984 (aged 30) | 13 | (Switzerland) Basel |
| 21 | DF | Eric Bailly | 12 April 1994 (aged 20) | 0 | (Spain) Espanyol |
| 22 | DF | Wilfried Kanon | 6 July 1993 (aged 21) | 0 | (Netherlands) ADO Den Haag |
| 23 | GK | Sayouba Mandé | 15 June 1993 (aged 21) | 1 | (Norway) Stabæk |

=== Mali ===
Coach: (Poland) Henryk Kasperczak

A 35-man provisional squad was announced on 27 December 2014. The final squad was announced the following day.

| No. | Pos. | Player | Date of birth (age) | Caps | Club |
|---|---|---|---|---|---|
| 1 | GK | Germain Berthé | 24 October 1993 (aged 21) | 1 | (Mali) Onze Créateurs |
| 2 | DF | Fousseni Diawara | 28 August 1980 (aged 34) | 54 | (France) Tours |
| 3 | DF | Adama Tamboura | 18 May 1985 (aged 29) | 75 | (Denmark) Randers |
| 4 | DF | Salif Coulibaly | 13 May 1988 (aged 26) | 10 | (Democratic Republic of the Congo) Mazembe |
| 5 | DF | Idrissa Coulibaly | 19 December 1987 (aged 27) | 14 | (Morocco) Hassania Agadir |
| 6 | MF | Tongo Doumbia | 6 August 1989 (aged 25) | 13 | (France) Toulouse |
| 7 | FW | Mustapha Yatabaré | 26 January 1986 (aged 28) | 23 | (Turkey) Trabzonspor |
| 8 | MF | Yacouba Sylla | 29 November 1990 (aged 24) | 9 | (Turkey) Kayseri Erciyesspor |
| 9 | FW | Mohamed Traoré | 18 November 1988 (aged 26) | 5 | (Sudan) Al-Merrikh |
| 10 | MF | Bakary Sako | 26 April 1988 (aged 26) | 8 | (England) Wolverhampton Wanderers |
| 11 | MF | Sigamary Diarra | 10 January 1984 (aged 31) | 22 | (France) Valenciennes |
| 12 | MF | Seydou Keita (c) | 16 January 1980 (aged 35) | 94 | (Italy) Roma |
| 13 | DF | Ousmane Coulibaly | 9 July 1989 (aged 25) | 14 | (Greece) Platanias |
| 14 | MF | Sambou Yatabaré | 2 March 1989 (aged 25) | 16 | (France) Guingamp |
| 15 | DF | Drissa Diakité | 18 February 1985 (aged 29) | 39 | (France) Bastia |
| 16 | GK | Soumbeïla Diakité | 25 August 1984 (aged 30) | 40 | (Iran) Esteghlal Khuzestan |
| 17 | MF | Mamoutou N'Diaye | 15 March 1990 (aged 24) | 2 | (Belgium) Zulte Waregem |
| 18 | FW | Abdoulay Diaby | 21 May 1991 (aged 23) | 3 | (Belgium) Mouscron-Péruwelz |
| 19 | DF | Mohamed Konate | 20 October 1992 (aged 22) | 2 | (Morocco) Nahdat Berkane |
| 20 | FW | Modibo Maïga | 3 September 1987 (aged 27) | 39 | (France) Metz |
| 21 | MF | Abdou Traoré | 17 January 1988 (aged 27) | 28 | (France) Bordeaux |
| 22 | GK | N'Tji Samaké | 27 June 1994 (aged 20) | 0 | (Mali) CS Duguwolofila |
| 23 | DF | Molla Wagué | 21 February 1991 (aged 23) | 7 | (Italy) Udinese |

=== Cameroon ===
Coach: (Germany) Volker Finke

A 24-man provisional squad was announced on 24 December 2014.

| No. | Pos. | Player | Date of birth (age) | Caps | Club |
|---|---|---|---|---|---|
| 1 | GK | Guy N'dy Assembé | 28 February 1986 (aged 28) | 12 | (France) Nancy |
| 2 | FW | Léonard Kweuke | 12 July 1987 (aged 27) | 17 | (Turkey) Çaykur Rizespor |
| 3 | DF | Nicolas N'Koulou | 27 March 1990 (aged 24) | 56 | (France) Marseille |
| 4 | MF | Raoul Loé | 31 January 1989 (aged 25) | 8 | (Spain) Osasuna |
| 5 | DF | Jérôme Guihoata | 7 October 1994 (aged 20) | 7 | (France) Valenciennes |
| 6 | DF | Ambroise Oyongo | 22 June 1991 (aged 23) | 6 | (United States) New York Red Bulls |
| 7 | MF | Clinton N'Jie | 15 August 1993 (aged 21) | 7 | (France) Lyon |
| 8 | MF | Benjamin Moukandjo | 12 November 1988 (aged 26) | 24 | (France) Reims |
| 9 | DF | Frank Bagnack | 7 June 1995 (aged 19) | 1 | (Spain) Barcelona B |
| 10 | FW | Vincent Aboubakar | 22 January 1992 (aged 22) | 32 | (Portugal) Porto |
| 11 | MF | Edgar Salli | 17 August 1992 (aged 22) | 18 | (Portugal) Académica de Coimbra |
| 12 | DF | Henri Bedimo | 4 June 1984 (aged 30) | 38 | (France) Lyon |
| 13 | FW | Eric Maxim Choupo-Moting | 23 March 1989 (aged 25) | 35 | (Germany) Schalke 04 |
| 14 | MF | Georges Mandjeck | 9 December 1988 (aged 26) | 26 | (Turkey) Kayseri Erciyesspor |
| 15 | FW | Franck Etoundi | 30 August 1990 (aged 24) | 4 | (Switzerland) Zürich |
| 16 | GK | Fabrice Ondoa | 24 December 1995 (aged 19) | 8 | (Spain) Barcelona B |
| 17 | MF | Stéphane Mbia (c) | 20 May 1986 (aged 28) | 57 | (Spain) Sevilla |
| 18 | MF | Eyong Enoh | 23 March 1986 (aged 28) | 46 | (Belgium) Standard Liège |
| 19 | DF | Cédric Djeugoué | 28 August 1992 (aged 22) | 7 | (Cameroon) Coton Sport |
| 20 | MF | Franck Kom | 18 September 1991 (aged 23) | 5 | (Tunisia) ES Sahel |
| 21 | DF | Aurélien Chedjou | 20 June 1985 (aged 29) | 33 | (Turkey) Galatasaray |
| 22 | MF | Patrick Ekeng | 26 March 1990 (aged 24) | 2 | (Spain) Córdoba |
| 23 | GK | Pierre Sylvain Abogo | 18 July 1993 (aged 21) | 0 | (Cameroon) Tonnerre Yaoundé |

=== Guinea ===
Coach: (France) Michel Dussuyer

The final squad was announced on 30 December 2014.

| No. | Pos. | Player | Date of birth (age) | Caps | Club |
|---|---|---|---|---|---|
| 1 | GK | Naby Yattara | 12 January 1984 (aged 31) | 39 | (France) Arles-Avignon |
| 2 | FW | Mohamed Yattara | 28 July 1993 (aged 21) | 12 | (France) Lyon |
| 3 | DF | Issiaga Sylla | 1 January 1994 (aged 21) | 12 | (France) Toulouse |
| 4 | DF | Florentin Pogba | 19 August 1990 (aged 24) | 7 | (France) Saint-Étienne |
| 5 | DF | Fodé Camara | 17 August 1988 (aged 26) | 10 | (Guinea) Horoya |
| 6 | DF | Kamil Zayatte | 7 March 1985 (aged 29) | 46 | (England) Sheffield Wednesday |
| 7 | MF | Abdoul Camara | 20 February 1990 (aged 24) | 11 | (France) Angers |
| 8 | MF | Ibrahima Traoré (c) | 21 April 1988 (aged 26) | 29 | (Germany) Borussia Mönchengladbach |
| 9 | MF | Guy-Michel Landel | 7 July 1990 (aged 24) | 4 | (Turkey) Orduspor |
| 10 | MF | Kévin Constant | 15 May 1987 (aged 27) | 21 | (Turkey) Trabzonspor |
| 11 | FW | Idrissa Sylla | 3 December 1990 (aged 24) | 14 | (Belgium) Zulte Waregem |
| 12 | MF | Ibrahima Conté | 3 April 1991 (aged 23) | 27 | (Belgium) Anderlecht |
| 13 | DF | Abdoulaye Cissé | 30 November 1994 (aged 20) | 6 | (France) Angers B |
| 14 | MF | Lanfia Camara | 3 October 1986 (aged 28) | 8 | (Belgium) Racing Mechelen |
| 15 | MF | Naby Keïta | 10 February 1995 (aged 19) | 8 | (Austria) Red Bull Salzburg |
| 16 | GK | Abdul Aziz Keita | 17 June 1990 (aged 24) | 10 | (Guinea) Kaloum Star |
| 17 | MF | Boubacar Fofana | 6 November 1989 (aged 25) | 8 | (Portugal) Nacional |
| 18 | MF | Seydouba Soumah | 11 June 1991 (aged 23) | 11 | (Slovakia) Slovan Bratislava |
| 19 | FW | François Kamano | 2 May 1996 (aged 18) | 2 | (France) Bastia |
| 20 | DF | Baissama Sankoh | 20 March 1992 (aged 22) | 5 | (France) Guingamp |
| 21 | DF | Mohammed Diarra | 2 June 1992 (aged 22) | 7 | (Denmark) OB |
| 22 | GK | Aboubacar Camara | 1 June 1993 (aged 21) | 0 | (Spain) UCAM Murcia |
| 23 | DF | Djibril Tamsir Paye | 26 February 1990 (aged 24) | 1 | (Belgium) Zulte Waregem |

== Player representation ==
=== By club ===
Clubs with 3 or more players represented are listed.

| Players | Club |
|---|---|
| 8 | (Democratic Republic of the Congo) Mazembe |
| 6 | (Republic of the Congo) Léopards |
| 5 | (France) Bordeaux, (France) Lyon, (France) Metz, (Tunisia) ES Tunis |
| 4 | (Belgium) Anderlecht, (Democratic Republic of the Congo) Vita Club, (France) Lorient, (France) Reims, (France) Toulouse |
| 3 | (Belgium) Charleroi, (Belgium) Genk, (Belgium) Zulte Waregem, (France) Angers, (France) Bastia, (France) Evian, (France) Guingamp, (France) Lille, (France) Marseille, (France) Saint-Étienne, (Italy) Roma, (Portugal) Estoril, (South Africa) Bidvest Wits, (South Africa) Kaizer Chiefs, (South Africa) Mamelodi Sundowns, (South Africa) Orlando Pirates, (Spain) Osasuna, (Switzerland) Zürich, (Tunisia) Club Africain, (Tunisia) ES Sahel, (Turkey) Kayseri Erciyesspor, (Turkey) Trabzonspor, (Zambia) Nkana, (Zambia) Red Arrows |

=== By club nationality ===
| Players | CAF clubs |
|---|---|
| 21 | South Africa |
| 15 | Tunisia |
| 13 | (Democratic Republic of the Congo) DR Congo |
| 10 | Zambia |
| 9 | (Republic of the Congo) Congo |
| 6 | Equatorial Guinea, Morocco |
| 5 | South Africa |
| 4 | Guinea |
| 2 | Algeria, Cameroon, Egypt, Gabon, Ghana, Mali |
| 1 | Burkina Faso, Ivory Coast, Sudan |

| Players | Clubs outside CAF |
|---|---|
| 72 | France |
| 26 | Spain |
| 21 | Belgium, England |
| 15 | Portugal |
| 13 | Turkey |
| 11 | Italy |
| 8 | Switzerland |
| 7 | Germany |
| 6 | Romania, Russia |
| 4 | Denmark, Netherlands |
| 3 | Cyprus, Greece, Norway, Scotland, United Arab Emirates, United States |
| 2 | Austria, Bulgaria, Czech Republic, India, Israel, Qatar, Wales |
| 1 | Andorra, Armenia, (China) , Croatia, Finland, Gibraltar, Hong Kong, Hungary, Iran, Malta, Mexico, Moldova, Slovakia, Ukraine |

=== By club federation ===
| Players | Federation |
|---|---|
| 246 | UEFA |
| 104 | CAF |
| 10 | AFC |
| 4 | CONCACAF |

=== By representatives of domestic league ===
| National squad | Players |
|---|---|
| South Africa | 18 |
| Tunisia | 12 |
| Zambia | 10 |
| Congo | 8 |
| DR Congo | 7 |
| Equatorial Guinea | 6 |
| Algeria | 2 |
| Cameroon | 2 |
| Gabon | 2 |
| Guinea | 2 |
| Mali | 2 |
| Burkina Faso | 1 |
| Ghana | 1 |
| Ivory Coast | 1 |
| Cape Verde | 0 |
| Senegal | 0 |
