= 2015 Africa Cup of Nations Group B =

Football tournament group stage

Group B of the 2015 Africa Cup of Nations was played from 18 January until 26 January in Equatorial Guinea. The group consisted of Zambia, Tunisia, Cape Verde, and DR Congo. Tunisia and DR Congo advanced as group winners and runners-up respectively, while Cape Verde and Zambia were eliminated.

== Teams ==
Draw position	Team	Method of qualification	Date of qualification	Finals appearance	Last appearance	Previous best performance	CAF Rankings Points (Note: The CAF rankings were used for seeding for the final draw.)	FIFA Rankings Start of event
B1	Zambia	Group F runners-up	15 November 2014	17th	2013	Winners (2012)	41	50
B2	Tunisia	Group G winners	14 November 2014	17th	2013	Winners (2004)	32.5	22
B3	Cape Verde	Group F winners	15 October 2014	2nd	2013	Quarter-finals (2013)	26.5	40
B4	DR Congo	Best third-placed team	19 November 2014	17th	2013	Winners (1968, 1974)	18	57

== Standings ==
Pos	Team	Pld	W	D	L	GF	GA	GD	Pts	Qualification
1	Tunisia	3	1	2	0	4	3	+1	5	Advance to knockout stage
2	DR Congo	3	0	3	0	2	2	0	3	Advance to knockout stage
3	Cape Verde	3	0	3	0	1	1	0	3	
4	Zambia	3	0	2	1	2	3	−1	2	

Source: CAF
Rules for classification: Tiebreakers

In the quarter-finals:

- Tunisia advanced to play Equatorial Guinea (runner-up of Group A).
- DR Congo advanced to play Congo (winner of Group A).

== Matches ==
All times local, WAT (UTC+1).

=== Zambia vs DR Congo ===
Zambia opened the scoring inside two minutes, as Chisamba Lungu controlled Robert Kidiaba's punch outside the area, allowing Given Singuluma to score with his right foot. Yannick Bolasie equalized for DR Congo in the 66th minute, as he shot home from inside the penalty area from Cedrick Mabwati's pass.

18 January 2015
17:00

Zambia	1–1	DR Congo
Singuluma 2'	Report	Bolasie 66'

Estadio de Ebibeyin, Ebibeyin
Attendance: 7,319
Referee: Gehad Grisha (Egypt)

Zambia	DR Congo

GK	16	Kennedy Mweene
RB	18	Emmanuel Mbola
CB	13	Stoppila Sunzu	(yellow card) 31'
CB	14	Kondwani Mtonga
LB	6	Davies Nkausu
CM	15	Given Singuluma	(yellow card) 68'
CM	19	Nathan Sinkala	(yellow card) 81'	(substituted off) 86'
RW	3	Chisamba Lungu
AM	9	Ronald Kampamba		(substituted off) 74'
LW	17	Rainford Kalaba (c)
CF	20	Emmanuel Mayuka		(substituted off) 67'
Substitutions:
FW	12	Evans Kangwa		(substituted in) 67'
FW	10	Mukuka Mulenga		(substituted in) 74'
DF	4	Christopher Munthali		(substituted in) 86'
Manager:
Honour Janza

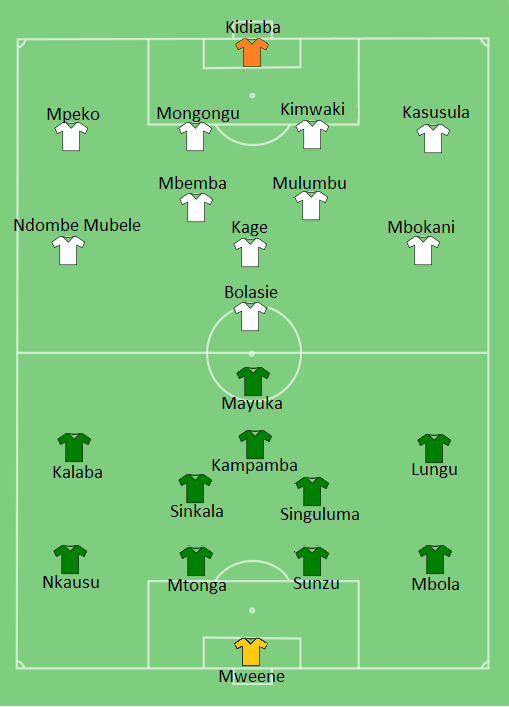

GK	1	Robert Kidiaba
RB	2	Issama Mpeko
CB	17	Cédric Mongongu
CB	15	Joël Kimwaki
LB	3	Jean Kasusula
CM	22	Chancel Mbemba Mangulu
CM	7	Youssouf Mulumbu (c)
RW	21	Firmin Ndombe Mubele	(substituted off) 63'
AM	8	Hervé Kage	(substituted off) 64'
LW	11	Yannick Bolasie
CF	9	Dieumerci Mbokani
Substitutions:
FW	18	Cedrick Mabwati	(substituted in) 63'
FW	13	Junior Kabananga	(substituted in) 64'
Manager:
Florent Ibengé

Man of the Match:
Yannick Bolasie (DR Congo)

Assistant referees:
Waleed Ahmed Ali (Sudan)
Tahssen Abo El Sadat (Egypt)
Fourth official:
Juste Ephrem Zio (Burkina Faso)

=== Tunisia vs Cape Verde ===
Tunisia opened the scoring in the 70th minute, as Ali Maâloul's cross was converted by Mohamed Ali Manser at the far post. Cape Verde equalized eight minutes later through Héldon's penalty after he was brought down by Syam Ben Youssef at the edge of the penalty area.

18 January 2015
20:00

Tunisia	1–1	Cape Verde
Manser 70'	Report	Héldon 78' (pen.)

Estadio de Ebibeyin, Ebibeyin
Attendance: 7,479
Referee: Eric Otogo-Castane (Gabon)

Tunisia	Cape Verde

GK	16	Aymen Mathlouthi
RB	14	Stéphane Nater
CB	2	Syam Ben Youssef
CB	3	Aymen Abdennour
LB	12	Ali Maâloul
CM	21	Jamel Saihi		(substituted off) 88'
CM	15	Mohamed Ali Manser
RW	9	Yassine Chikhaoui (c)
LW	18	Wahbi Khazri	(yellow card) 15'	(substituted off) 82'
CF	17	Hamza Mathlouthi
CF	19	Ahmed Akaïchi		(substituted off) 82'
Substitutions:
MF	7	Youssef Msakni		(substituted in) 82'
FW	8	Edem Rjaïbi		(substituted in) 82'
FW	6	Hocine Ragued		(substituted in) 88'
Manager:
(Belgium) Georges Leekens

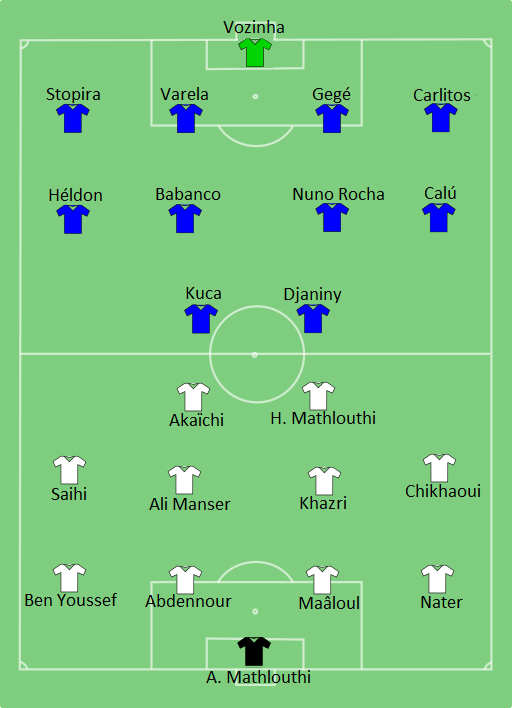

GK	1	Vozinha
RB	2	Stopira
CB	3	Fernando Varela
CB	14	Gegé
LB	23	Carlitos	(substituted off) 74'
CM	5	Babanco (c)
CM	15	Nuno Rocha
RW	10	Héldon
LW	17	Calú
CF	9	Kuca	(substituted off) 84'
CF	21	Djaniny	(substituted off) 68'
Substitutions:
FW	19	Júlio Tavares	(substituted in) 68'
FW	20	Ryan Mendes	(substituted in) 74'
FW	7	Odaïr Fortes	(substituted in) 84'
Manager:
(Portugal) Rui Águas

Man of the Match:
Héldon (Cape Verde)

Assistant referees:
Aboubacar Doumbouya (Guinea)
Theogene Ndagijimana (Rwanda)
Fourth official:
Ali Lemghaifry (Mauritania)

=== Zambia vs Tunisia ===
Zambia took the lead in the 60th minute, when Emmanuel Mayuka scored home from Rainford Kalaba's lofted pass. Tunisia equalized ten minutes later after Syam Ben Youssef flicked a corner to Ahmed Akaïchi to score from close range. They completed the comeback in the 89th minute, as Yassine Chikhaoui headed in Youssef Msakni's cross.

22 January 2015
17:00

Zambia	1–2	Tunisia
Mayuka 60'	Report	Akaïchi 70'; Chikhaoui 89'

Estadio de Ebibeyin, Ebibeyin
Attendance: 8,000
Referee: Aboubacar Mario Bangoura (Guinea)

Zambia	Tunisia

GK	16	Kennedy Mweene
RB	6	Davies Nkausu
CB	13	Stoppila Sunzu
CB	4	Christopher Munthali	(yellow card) 79'
LB	18	Emmanuel Mbola
CM	15	Given Singuluma
CM	14	Kondwani Mtonga
AM	12	Evans Kangwa		(substituted off) 88'
RF	11	Lubambo Musonda
CF	17	Rainford Kalaba (c)	(yellow card) 51'
LF	20	Emmanuel Mayuka		(substituted off) 71'
Substitutions:
FW	21	Jackson Mwanza		(substituted in) 71'
MF	10	Mukuka Mulenga		(substituted in) 88'
Manager:
Honour Janza

GK	16	Aymen Mathlouthi
RB	5	Rami Bedoui
CB	3	Aymen Abdennour
CB	2	Syam Ben Youssef
LB	12	Ali Maâloul
CM	21	Jamel Saihi	(substituted off) 75'
CM	6	Hocine Ragued
AM	9	Yassine Chikhaoui (c)
RF	19	Ahmed Akaïchi	(substituted off) 80'
CF	18	Wahbi Khazri	(substituted off) 66'
LF	7	Youssef Msakni
Substitutions:
MF	15	Mohamed Ali Manser	(substituted in) 66'
MF	13	Ferjani Sassi	(substituted in) 75'
FW	10	Hamza Younés	(substituted in) 80'
Manager:
(Belgium) Georges Leekens

Man of the Match:
Rainford Kalaba (Zambia)

Assistant referees:
Songuifolo Yéo (Ivory Coast)
Jerson dos Santos (Angola)
Fourth official:
Bakary Gassama (Gambia)

=== Cape Verde vs DR Congo ===
Both teams played to their second consecutive draw. DR Congo lost their captain Youssouf Mulumbu to injury in the first half. Cape Verde had chances to win at the end of the match, but had their shots saved by opposing goalkeeper Robert Kidiaba.

22 January 2015
20:00

Cape Verde	0–0	DR Congo
	Report

Estadio de Ebibeyin, Ebibeyin
Attendance: 7,680
Referee: Malang Diedhiou (Senegal)

Cape Verde	DR Congo

GK	1	Vozinha
RB	23	Carlitos
CB	14	Gegé
CB	3	Fernando Varela
LB	2	Stopira
RM	17	Calú
CM	15	Nuno Rocha
LM	5	Babanco (c)
RF	20	Ryan Mendes	(substituted off) 71'
CF	19	Júlio Tavares	(substituted off) 79'
LF	9	Kuca	(substituted off) 59'
Substitutions:
FW	10	Héldon	(substituted in) 59'
FW	7	Odaïr Fortes	(substituted in) 71'
MF	13	Platini	(substituted in) 79'
Manager:
(Portugal) Rui Águas

GK	1	Robert Kidiaba
RB	2	Issama Mpeko
CB	17	Cédric Mongongu
CB	15	Joël Kimwaki
LB	3	Jean Kasusula
CM	22	Chancel Mbemba Mangulu
CM	7	Youssouf Mulumbu (c)	(substituted off) 23'
AM	20	Lema Mabidi	(substituted off) 86'
RF	18	Cedrick Mabwati
CF	11	Yannick Bolasie	(substituted off) 63'
LF	9	Dieumerci Mbokani
Substitutions:
MF	5	Nelson Munganga	(substituted in) 23'
FW	19	Jeremy Bokila	(substituted in) 63'
FW	21	Firmin Ndombe Mubele	(substituted in) 86'
Manager:
Florent Ibengé

Man of the Match:
Babanco (Cape Verde)

Assistant referees:
Djibril Camara (Senegal)
El Hadji Malick Samba (Senegal)
Fourth official:
Joseph Odartei Lamptey (Ghana)

=== Cape Verde vs Zambia ===
In a match played under torrential rain, both teams could not find the net, and the goalless draw meant both teams were eliminated from the tournament.

26 January 2015
19:00

Cape Verde	0–0	Zambia
	Report

Estadio de Ebibeyin, Ebibeyin
Attendance: 7,950
Referee: Sidi Alioum (Cameroon)

Cape Verde	Zambia

GK	1	Vozinha
RB	14	Gegé
CB	23	Carlitos	(yellow card) 33'	(substituted off) 79'
CB	3	Fernando Varela
LB	2	Stopira
DM	8	Toni Varela		(substituted off) 74'
CM	17	Calú
CM	15	Nuno Rocha
RW	20	Ryan Mendes		(substituted off) 57'
LW	10	Héldon (c)
CF	11	Garry Rodrigues
Substitutions:
FW	21	Djaniny		(substituted in) 57'
FW	7	Odaïr Fortes		(substituted in) 74'
FW	9	Kuca		(substituted in) 79'
Manager:
(Portugal) Rui Águas

GK	16	Kennedy Mweene
RB	6	Davies Nkausu
CB	13	Stoppila Sunzu
CB	4	Christopher Munthali	(yellow card) 45+2'	(substituted off) 58'
LB	18	Emmanuel Mbola
CM	14	Kondwani Mtonga
CM	3	Chisamba Lungu
AM	15	Given Singuluma		(substituted off) 84'
RF	11	Lubambo Musonda		(substituted off) 71'
CF	12	Evans Kangwa	(yellow card) 75'
LF	17	Rainford Kalaba (c)
Substitutions:
DF	2	Donashano Malama		(substituted in) 58'
FW	23	Patrick Ngoma		(substituted in) 71'
MF	10	Mukuka Mulenga		(substituted in) 84'
Manager:
Honour Janza

Man of the Match:
Rainford Kalaba (Zambia)

Assistant referees:
Aden Marwa Range (Kenya)
Zakhele Thusi Siwela (South Africa)
Fourth official:
Juste Ephrem Zio (Burkina Faso)

=== DR Congo vs Tunisia ===
Tunisia took the lead in the 31st minute, as Yassine Chikhaoui's shot was deflected and Ahmed Akaïchi headed the ball in. DR Congo equalized in the 66th minute, after Dieumerci Mbokani headed down a long ball for Jeremy Bokila to score. The result was enough for Tunisia to win the group, while DR Congo also qualified as runners-up, ahead of Cape Verde on goals scored.

26 January 2015
19:00

DR Congo	1–1	Tunisia
Bokila 66'	Report	Akaïchi 31'

Estadio de Bata, Bata
Attendance: 11,463
Referee: Bakary Gassama (Gambia)

DR Congo	Tunisia

GK	1	Robert Kidiaba (c)
RB	2	Issama Mpeko
CB	17	Cédric Mongongu	(substituted off) 87'
CB	15	Joël Kimwaki
LB	3	Jean Kasusula
CM	22	Chancel Mbemba Mangulu
CM	6	Cédric Makiadi
RW	21	Firmin Ndombe Mubele	(substituted off) 78'
AM	18	Cedrick Mabwati	(substituted off) 60'
LW	11	Yannick Bolasie
CF	9	Dieumerci Mbokani
Substitutions:
FW	19	Jeremy Bokila	(substituted in) 60'
FW	13	Junior Kabananga	(substituted in) 78'
DF	14	Gabriel Zakuani	(substituted in) 87'
Manager:
Florent Ibengé

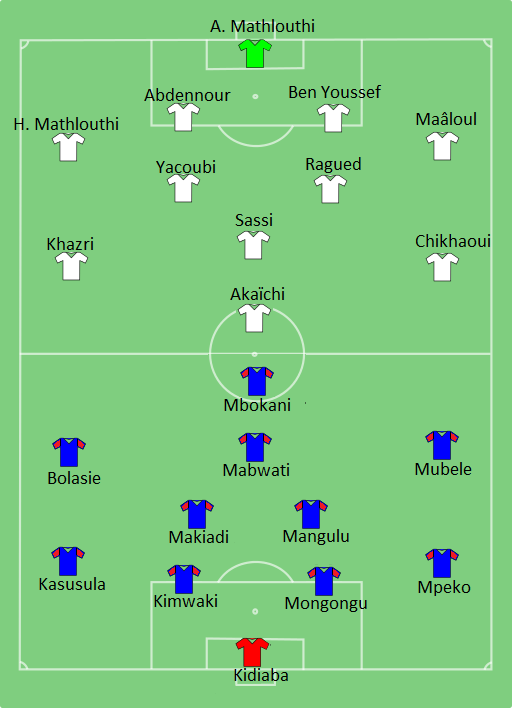

GK	16	Aymen Mathlouthi
RB	17	Hamza Mathlouthi
CB	3	Aymen Abdennour
CB	2	Syam Ben Youssef
LB	12	Ali Maâloul
CM	20	Mohamed Ali Yacoubi	(yellow card) 8'
CM	6	Hocine Ragued		(substituted off) 87'
RW	18	Wahbi Khazri		(substituted off) 77'
AM	13	Ferjani Sassi
LW	9	Yassine Chikhaoui (c)
CF	19	Ahmed Akaïchi		(substituted off) 73'
Substitutions:
FW	10	Hamza Younés		(substituted in) 73'
MF	15	Mohamed Ali Manser		(substituted in) 77'
MF	14	Stéphane Nater		(substituted in) 87'
Manager:
(Belgium) Georges Leekens

Man of the Match:
Jeremy Bokila (DR Congo)

Assistant referees:
Redouane Achik (Morocco)
Yahaya Mahamadou (Niger)
Fourth official:
Koman Coulibaly (Mali)
