= 2015 Africa Cup of Nations Group C =

Football tournament group stage

Group C of the 2015 Africa Cup of Nations was played from 19 January until 27 January in Equatorial Guinea. The group consisted of Ghana, Algeria, South Africa, and Senegal. Ghana and Algeria advanced as group winners and runners-up respectively, while Senegal and South Africa were eliminated.

== Teams ==
Draw position	Team	Method of qualification	Date of qualification	Finals appearance	Last appearance	Previous best performance	CAF Rankings Points (Note: The CAF rankings were used for seeding for the final draw.)	FIFA Rankings Start of event
C1	Ghana	Group E winners	19 November 2014	20th	2013	Winners (1963, 1965, 1978, 1982)	48	37
C2	Algeria	Group B winners	15 October 2014	16th	2013	Winners (1990)	28	18
C3	South Africa	Group A winners	15 November 2014	9th	2013	Winners (1996)	23.5	52
C4	Senegal	Group G runners-up	15 November 2014	13th	2012	Runners-up (2002)	19	35

== Standings ==
Pos	Team	Pld	W	D	L	GF	GA	GD	Pts	Qualification
1	Ghana	3	2	0	1	4	3	+1	6	Advance to knockout stage
2	Algeria	3	2	0	1	5	2	+3	6	Advance to knockout stage
3	Senegal	3	1	1	1	3	4	−1	4	
4	South Africa	3	0	1	2	3	6	−3	1	

Source: CAF
Rules for classification: Tiebreakers

In the quarter-finals:

- Ghana advanced to play Guinea (runner-up of Group D).
- Algeria advanced to play Ivory Coast (winner of Group D).

== Matches ==
All times local, WAT (UTC+1).

=== Ghana vs Senegal ===
Ghana took the lead in the 14th minute through a penalty by André Ayew, awarded after Christian Atsu was brought down by Bouna Coundoul. Senegal equalized in the 58th minute as Mame Biram Diouf headed in the rebound after his initial header hit the post, and won the game in the third minute of injury time as Moussa Sow shot home a pass from Diouf.

19 January 2015
17:00

Ghana	1–2	Senegal
A. Ayew 14' (pen.)	Report	Diouf 58'; Sow 90+3'

Estadio de Mongomo, Mongomo
Attendance: 13,569
Referee: Bernard Camille (Seychelles)

Ghana	Senegal

GK	1	Brimah Razak
CB	5	Mohamed Awal
CB	18	Daniel Amartey
CB	19	Jonathan Mensah
RM	23	Harrison Afful
CM	13	Mohammed Rabiu	(yellow card) 79'	(substituted off) 83'
CM	8	Emmanuel Agyemang-Badu
LM	17	Baba Rahman
RF	7	Christian Atsu		(substituted off) 68'
CF	9	Jordan Ayew
LF	10	André Ayew (c)	(yellow card) 64'	(substituted off) 88'
Substitutions:
MF	11	Mubarak Wakaso		(substituted on) 68'
MF	6	Afriyie Acquah		(substituted on) 83'
FW	20	David Accam		(substituted on) 88'
Manager:
(Israel) Avram Grant

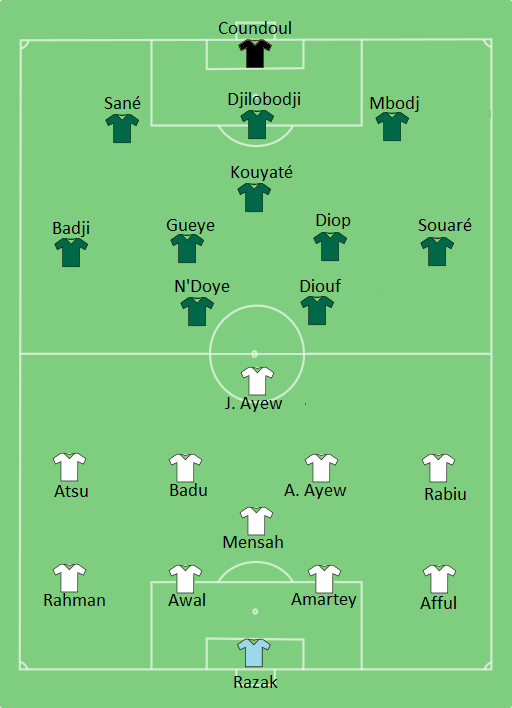

GK	1	Bouna Coundoul (c)	(yellow card) 13'
RB	6	Lamine Sané
CB	3	Papy Djilobodji		(substituted off) 46'
CB	2	Kara Mbodj
LB	18	Pape Souaré
RM	12	Stéphane Badji
CM	8	Cheikhou Kouyaté
CM	17	Idrissa Gueye
LM	5	Papakouli Diop		(substituted off) 85'
CF	11	Dame N'Doye	(yellow card) 25'	(substituted off) 79'
CF	9	Mame Biram Diouf
Substitutions:
DF	21	Lamine Gassama		(substituted on) 46'
FW	7	Moussa Sow		(substituted on) 79'
MF	22	Henri Saivet		(substituted on) 85'
Manager:
(France) Alain Giresse

Man of the Match:
Mame Biram Diouf (Senegal)

Assistant referees:
Peter Edibe (Nigeria)
Hassan Egueh (Djibouti)
Fourth official:
Bamlak Tessema Weyesa (Ethiopia)

=== Algeria vs South Africa ===
South Africa took the lead in the 51st minute, as Thuso Phala shot home a pass from Sibusiso Vilakazi. They missed the chance to increase the lead four minutes later after Tokelo Rantie's penalty, awarded for a foul on Vilakazi by Aïssa Mandi, hit the bar and went out, and conceded the equalizer in the 67th minute, as Thulani Hlatshwayo headed Yacine Brahimi's cross into his own goal. Algeria took the lead as Faouzi Ghoulam received Sofiane Feghouli's cross, ran into the penalty area and hammered past the goalkeeper, and sealed the win in the 83rd minute, after Ishak Belfodil fed Islam Slimani, whose shot squirmed through the goalkeeper's hands.

19 January 2015
20:00

Algeria	3–1	South Africa
Hlatshwayo 67' (o.g.); Ghoulam 72'; Slimani 83'	Report	Phala 51'

Estadio de Mongomo, Mongomo
Attendance: 12,788
Referee: Noumandiez Doué (Ivory Coast)

Algeria	South Africa

GK	23	Raïs M'Bolhi
CB	20	Aïssa Mandi	(yellow card) 53'
CB	12	Carl Medjani
CB	5	Rafik Halliche (c)
RM	7	Riyad Mahrez		(substituted off) 60'
CM	14	Nabil Bentaleb
CM	8	Mehdi Lacen		(substituted off) 64'
LM	3	Faouzi Ghoulam
AM	11	Yacine Brahimi		(substituted off) 90'
AM	10	Sofiane Feghouli
CF	13	Islam Slimani
Substitutions:
FW	9	Ishak Belfodil		(substituted on) 60'
MF	19	Saphir Taïder		(substituted on) 64'
FW	15	Hillal Soudani		(substituted on) 90'
Manager:
(France) Christian Gourcuff

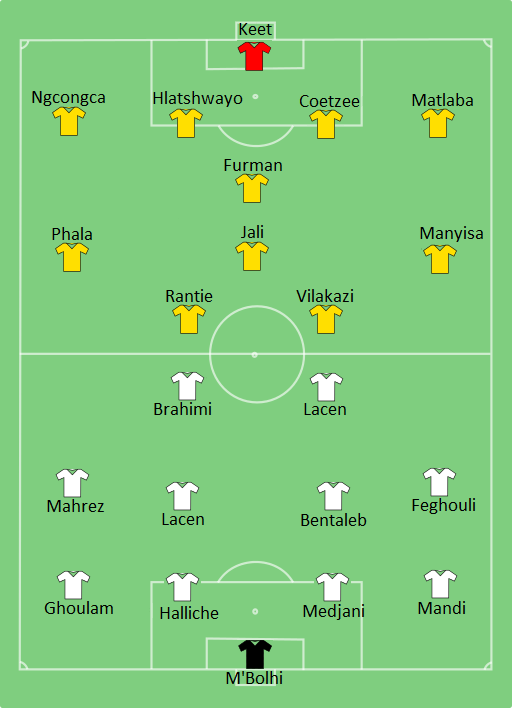

GK	1	Darren Keet
CB	14	Thulani Hlatshwayo
CB	5	Andile Jali
CB	2	Rivaldo Coetzee		(substituted off) 29'
RM	6	Anele Ngcongca
CM	15	Dean Furman (c)
CM	20	Oupa Manyisa
LM	11	Thabo Matlaba	(yellow card) 33'
RF	18	Thuso Phala
CF	23	Tokelo Rantie		(substituted off) 79'
LF	10	Sibusiso Vilakazi		(substituted off) 85'
Substitutions:
MF	4	Siyabonga Nhlapo		(substituted on) 29'
FW	9	Bongani Ndulula		(substituted on) 79'
MF	7	Mandla Masango		(substituted on) 85'
Manager:
Ephraim Mashaba

Man of the Match:
Faouzi Ghoulam (Algeria)

Assistant referees:
Songuifolo Yéo (Ivory Coast)
Jean-Claude Birumushasu (Burundi)
Fourth official:
Aboubacar Mario Bangoura (Guinea)

=== Ghana vs Algeria ===
The only goal was scored in the second minute of second half injury time, as Asamoah Gyan chased down a long pass from Mubarak Wakaso to give Ghana the victory.

23 January 2015
17:00

Ghana	1–0	Algeria
Gyan 90+2'	Report

Estadio de Mongomo, Mongomo
Attendance: 12,387
Referee: Koman Coulibaly (Mali)

Ghana	Algeria

GK	1	Brimah Razak
RB	23	Harrison Afful
CB	18	Daniel Amartey
CB	19	Jonathan Mensah
LB	17	Baba Rahman
CM	6	Afriyie Acquah	(yellow card) 26'	(substituted off) 55'
CM	8	Emmanuel Agyemang-Badu
RW	7	Christian Atsu
AM	9	Jordan Ayew		(substituted off) 78'
LW	10	André Ayew		(substituted off) 84'
CF	3	Asamoah Gyan (c)
Substitutions:
MF	11	Mubarak Wakaso		(substituted on) 55'
FW	15	Mahatma Otoo		(substituted on) 78'
MF	14	Solomon Asante		(substituted on) 84'
Manager:
(Israel) Avram Grant

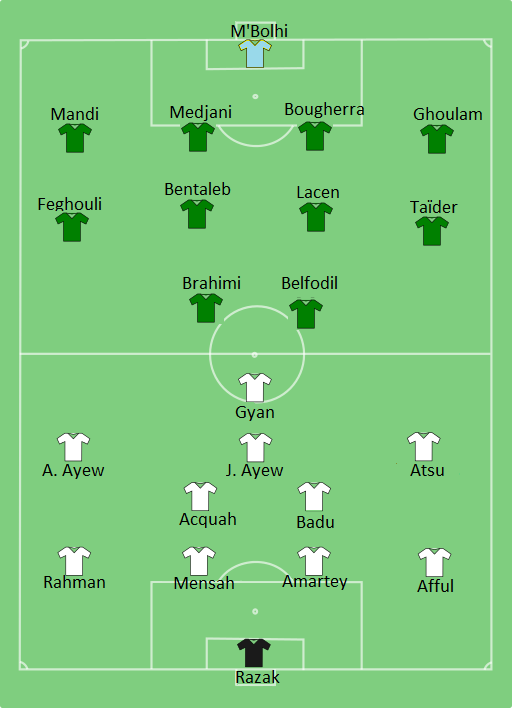

GK	23	Raïs M'Bolhi
CB	20	Aïssa Mandi
CB	12	Carl Medjani
CB	2	Madjid Bougherra (c)	(yellow card) 45+1'
DM	14	Nabil Bentaleb	(yellow card) 73'
DM	8	Mehdi Lacen		(substituted off) 71'
CM	19	Saphir Taïder
AM	10	Sofiane Feghouli
AM	11	Yacine Brahimi		(substituted off) 87'
SS	3	Faouzi Ghoulam
CF	9	Ishak Belfodil		(substituted off) 56'
Substitutions:
FW	13	Islam Slimani		(substituted on) 56'
FW	7	Riyad Mahrez		(substituted on) 71'
MF	17	Foued Kadir		(substituted on) 87'
Manager:
(France) Christian Gourcuff

Man of the Match:
Yacine Brahimi (Algeria)

Assistant referees:
Jean-Claude Birumushahu (Burundi)
Hassan Egueh Yacin (Djibouti)
Fourth official:
Joaquin Esono Eyang (Equatorial Guinea)

=== South Africa vs Senegal ===
South Africa took the lead in the 47th minute, as Oupa Manyisa scored from Anele Ngcongca's cross. Senegal equalized in the 60th minute when Kara Mbodj headed in Papakouli Diop's free kick.

23 January 2015
20:00

South Africa	1–1	Senegal
Manyisa 47'	Report	Mbodj 60'

Estadio de Mongomo, Mongomo
Attendance: 13,674
Referee: Ali Lemghaifry (Mauritania)

South Africa	Senegal

GK	22	Jackson Mabokgwane
CB	14	Thulani Hlatshwayo		(substituted off) 30'
CB	5	Andile Jali
CB	3	Eric Mathoho
RM	6	Anele Ngcongca
CM	15	Dean Furman (c)	(yellow card) 79'
CM	20	Oupa Manyisa		(substituted off) 72'
LM	11	Thabo Matlaba
RF	18	Thuso Phala		(substituted off) 67'
CF	23	Tokelo Rantie
LF	10	Sibusiso Vilakazi
Substitutions:
DF	21	Ayanda Gcaba		(substituted on) 30'
MF	17	Bernard Parker		(substituted on) 67'
MF	12	Reneilwe Letsholonyane		(substituted on) 72'
Manager:
Ephraim Mashaba

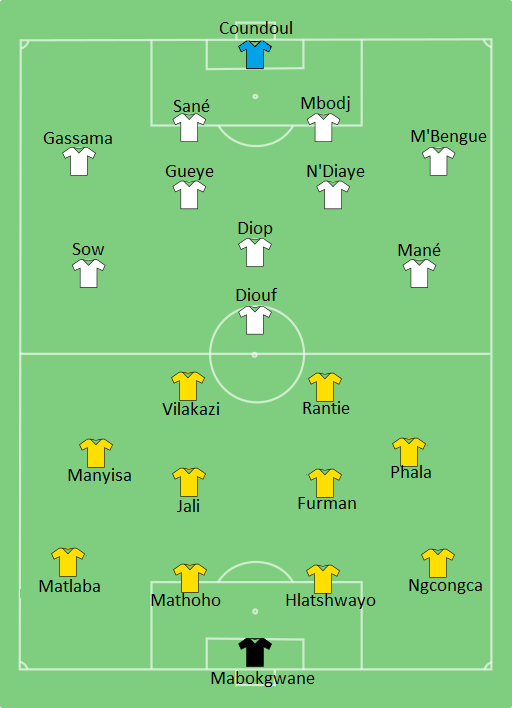

GK	1	Bouna Coundoul (c)
RB	21	Lamine Gassama
CB	6	Lamine Sané
CB	2	Kara Mbodj
LB	13	Cheikh M'Bengue
CM	17	Idrissa Gueye
CM	5	Papakouli Diop	(substituted off) 90'
CM	4	Alfred N'Diaye	(substituted off) 84'
RF	7	Moussa Sow	(substituted off) 79'
CF	9	Mame Biram Diouf
LF	10	Sadio Mané
Substitutions:
FW	11	Dame N'Doye	(substituted on) 79'
MF	8	Cheikhou Kouyaté	(substituted on) 84'
MF	22	Henri Saivet	(substituted on) 90'
Manager:
(France) Alain Giresse

Man of the Match:
Kara Mbodj (Senegal)

Assistant referees:
Angesom Ogbamariam (Ethiopia)
Theogene Ndagijimana (Rwanda)
Fourth official:
Rajindraparsad Seechurn (Mauritius)

=== South Africa vs Ghana ===
South Africa took the lead in the 17th minute, as Mandla Masango volleyed in a headed clearance from the Ghana defence from outside the penalty area. Ghana equalized in the 73rd minute, when André Ayew's shot fell to John Boye to score. André Ayew clinched the win for Ghana with a header from a Baba Rahman cross in the 83rd minute, confirming Ghana as group winners, while South Africa were eliminated.

27 January 2015
19:00

South Africa	1–2	Ghana
Masango 17'	Report	Boye 73'; A. Ayew 83'

Estadio de Mongomo, Mongomo
Attendance: 13,670
Referee: Hamada Nampiandraza (Madagascar)

South Africa	Ghana

GK	16	Nhlanhla Khuzwayo
RB	6	Anele Ngcongca	(yellow card) 37'
CB	3	Eric Mathoho
CB	2	Rivaldo Coetzee
LB	11	Thabo Matlaba
DM	5	Andile Jali
RM	18	Thuso Phala		(substituted off) 58'
CM	15	Dean Furman (c)	(yellow card) 79'
LM	9	Bongani Ndulula		(substituted off) 85'
SS	7	Mandla Masango
CF	23	Tokelo Rantie		(substituted off) 73'
Substitutions:
MF	10	Sibusiso Vilakazi		(substituted on) 58'
MF	12	Reneilwe Letsholonyane		(substituted on) 73'
MF	17	Bernard Parker		(substituted on) 85'
Manager:
Ephraim Mashaba

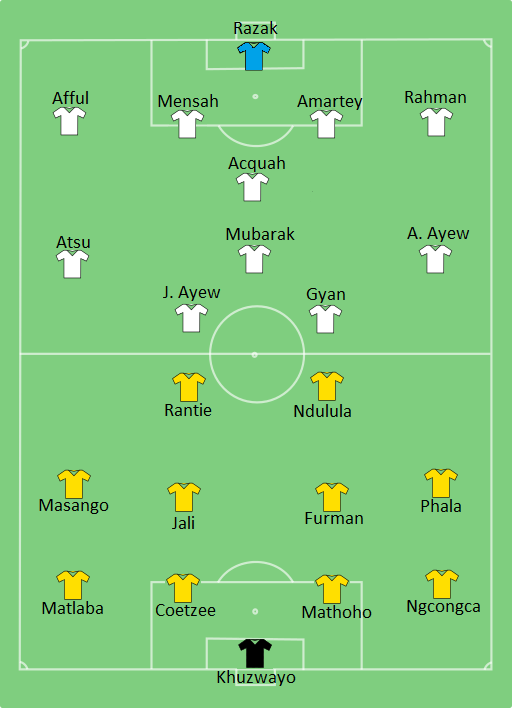

GK	1	Brimah Razak	(yellow card) 90'
RB	23	Harrison Afful
CB	18	Daniel Amartey		(substituted off) 36'
CB	19	Jonathan Mensah
LB	17	Baba Rahman
RM	7	Christian Atsu
CM	6	Afriyie Acquah		(substituted off) 70'
CM	11	Mubarak Wakaso
LM	10	André Ayew
CF	9	Jordan Ayew		(substituted off) 70'
CF	3	Asamoah Gyan (c)
Substitutions:
DF	21	John Boye		(substituted on) 36'
MF	8	Emmanuel Agyemang-Badu		(substituted on) 70'
FW	2	Kwesi Appiah		(substituted on) 70'
Manager:
(Israel) Avram Grant

Man of the Match:
Christian Atsu (Ghana)

Assistant referees:
Evarist Menkouande (Cameroon)
Songuifolo Yeo (Ivory Coast)
Fourth official:
Janny Sikazwe (Zambia)

=== Senegal vs Algeria ===
Algeria took the lead in the 11th minute, when Madjid Bougherra's long free kick found Riyad Mahrez to score. They sealed the win in the 82nd minute after Nabil Bentaleb received Sofiane Feghouli's pass on the edge of the penalty area and shot home. As a result, Algeria advanced as group runners-up (behind Ghana based on head-to-head record), while Senegal were eliminated.

27 January 2015
19:00

Senegal	0–2	Algeria
	Report	Mahrez 11'; Bentaleb 82'

Estadio de Malabo, Malabo
Attendance: 14,549
Referee: Rajindraparsad Seechurn (Mauritius)

Senegal	Algeria

GK	1	Bouna Coundoul (c)
RB	6	Lamine Sané
CB	3	Papy Djilobodji
CB	2	Kara Mbodj
LB	13	Cheikh M'Bengue		(substituted off) 29'
RM	12	Stéphane Badji	(yellow card) 41'
CM	8	Cheikhou Kouyaté
CM	17	Idrissa Gueye
LM	5	Papakouli Diop		(substituted off) 54'
CF	10	Sadio Mané		(substituted off) 66'
CF	9	Mame Biram Diouf	(yellow card) 67'
Substitutions:
DF	18	Pape Souaré	(yellow card) 81'	(substituted on) 29'
FW	15	Papiss Cissé		(substituted on) 54'
FW	11	Dame N'Doye		(substituted on) 66'
Manager:
(France) Alain Giresse

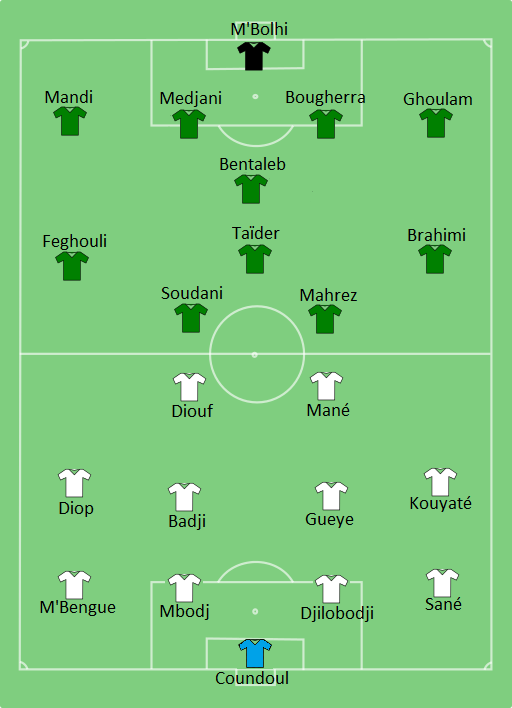

GK	23	Raïs M'Bolhi	(yellow card) 77'
RB	20	Aïssa Mandi
CB	12	Carl Medjani
CB	14	Nabil Bentaleb
LB	2	Madjid Bougherra (c)
RM	7	Riyad Mahrez		(substituted off) 90+2'
CM	19	Saphir Taïder	(yellow card) 52'
LM	3	Faouzi Ghoulam
AM	11	Yacine Brahimi		(substituted off) 72'
AM	10	Sofiane Feghouli
CF	15	Hillal Soudani		(substituted off) 80'
Substitutions:
MF	8	Mehdi Lacen		(substituted on) 72'
FW	9	Ishak Belfodil		(substituted on) 80'
MF	21	Ahmed Kashi		(substituted on) 90+2'
Manager:
(France) Christian Gourcuff

Man of the Match:
Riyad Mahrez (Algeria)

Assistant referees:
Waleed Ahmed Ali (Sudan)
Jerson Emiliano Dos Santos (Angola)
Fourth official:
Joaquin Eyang (Equatorial Guinea)
