= Toaster Nsabata =

Zambian footballer (born 1993)

Personal information
- Date of birth: 24 November 1993 (age 32)
- Place of birth: Chingola, Zambia
- Height: 1.83 m (6 ft 0 in)
- Position: Goalkeeper

Team information
- Current team: Sekhukhune United
- Number: 1

Senior career*
Years	Team	Apps	(Gls)
2013–2015	Nchanga Rangers		
2015–2021	Zanaco		
2021	ZESCO United		
2021–2023	Sekhukhune United	34	(0)
2023–2025	ZESCO United		
2025–	Sekhukhune United	6	(0)

International career^{‡}
2014	Zambia U23	1	(0)
2014–	Zambia	37	(0)
- * Club domestic league appearances and goals as of 4 January 2026 ‡ National team caps and goals as of 20 March 2024

Toaster Nsabata (born 24 November 1993) is a Zambian professional footballer who plays as a goalkeeper for Sekhukhune United in the South African Premier Division and the Zambia national team.

== Club career ==
Nsabata was born in Chingola.

Sighted training with Zanaco F.C. which was initially perceived as temporary, he afterward he made his departure from Nchanga Rangers F.C. in early 2016.

Nsabata suffered inconsequential injuries in an automobile accident on in July 2015.

In December 2020, he left Zanaco in December 2020 following the expiry of his contract. He signed for ZESCO United in January 2021 on a three-year contract.

In August 2021, he signed for Sekhukhune United of the South African Premier Division. In 2023 he returned to Zesco United.

== International career ==
In 2014, Nsabata made his senior debut, playing the complete 90 minutes in a 4–3 loss to Japan. He was dropped from the 2015 Africa Cup of Nations Zambia squad by coach Honour Janza.
