= Ahmed Akaïchi =

Tunisian footballer (born 1989)

Ahmed Akaichi
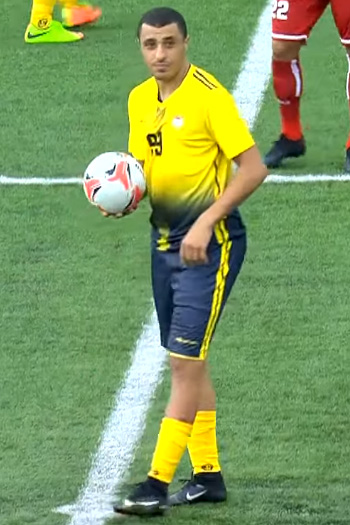
- Akaïchi with Ahed in 2019

Personal information
- Date of birth: 23 February 1989 (age 37)
- Place of birth: Bizerte, Tunisia
- Height: 1.85 m (6 ft 1 in)
- Position: Striker

Youth career
- 1994–2005: Bizerte
- 2005–2007: Club Africain
- 2007–2008: Bizerte

Senior career*
Years	Team	Apps	(Gls)
2008–2011	Étoile du Sahel	46	(25)
2011–2012	Ingolstadt 04	25	(5)
2013–2015	Espérance de Tunis	63	(23)
2015–2016	Étoile du Sahel	20	(8)
2016–2018	Al-Ittihad	41	(19)
2018–2019	Étoile du Sahel	6	(0)
2019	Al-Ettifaq	14	(3)
2019–2020	Ahed	1	(2)
2020	Al-Shahania	6	(3)
2020	Al-Ahli	4	(1)
2020–2021	Kuwait SC	24	(13)
2022	Ahed	8	(9)
Total		258	(111)

International career
2010–2018	Tunisia	28	(9)
- * Club domestic league appearances and goals

Ahmed Akaïchi (Arabic: أحمد العكايشي; born 23 February 1989) is a Tunisian former professional footballer who played as a striker.

== Club career ==
Akaïchi was born in Bizerte, Tunisia. Prior to the 2009–10 season, he played up front for Étoile du Sahel. On 22 August 2009, he scored four goals in one game against local rivals ES Hammam-Sousse in a 5–1 win.

In the summer of 2011, Akaïchi left Tunisia and joined German second division club FC Ingolstadt 04.

During July 2015, Akaïchi went on trial with English Championship side Reading, but did not earn a contract.

In February 2022, returned to Lebanese Premier League club Ahed, ahead of the second leg of the 2021–22 season.

== International career ==
Akaïchi earned his first call up to the Tunisia national team when he was selected for the 2010 African Cup of Nations, held in Angola.

Akaïchi represented Tunisia at the 2015 Africa Cup of Nations, scoring in a 1–1 draw with the Democratic Republic of the Congo to ensure that Tunisia qualified for the knockout stage.

After being named in Tunisia’s preliminary squad for the 2018 World Cup in Russia, he was one of six players to not make the final 23-man squad.

== Career statistics ==
=== International ===
Scores and results list Tunisia's goal tally first, score column indicates score after each Akaïchi goal.

List of international goals scored by Ahmed Akaïchi
No.	Date	Venue	Opponent	Score	Result	Competition
1	20 June 2010	Khartoum Stadium, Khartoum, Sudan	Sudan	6–1	6–2	Friendly
2	17 November 2013	Stade Ahmadou Ahidjo, Yaoundé, Cameroon	Cameroon	1–2	1–4	2014 FIFA World Cup qualification
3	22 January 2015	Estadio de Ebibeyin, Ebibeyin, Equatorial Guinea	Zambia	1–1	2–1	2015 Africa Cup of Nations
4	26 January 2015	Estadio de Ebibeyin, Ebibeyin, Equatorial Guinea	DR Congo	1–0	1–1	2015 Africa Cup of Nations
5	31 January 2015	Estadio de Bata, Bata, Equatorial Guinea	Equatorial Guinea	1–0	1–2	2015 Africa Cup of Nations
6	18 January 2016	Stade Régional Nyamirambo, Kigali, Rwanda	Guinea	1–0	2–2	2016 African Nations Championship
7	18 January 2016	Stade Régional Nyamirambo, Kigali, Rwanda	Guinea	2–1	2–2	2016 African Nations Championship
8	22 January 2016	Stade Régional Nyamirambo, Kigali, Rwanda	Nigeria	1–1	1–1	2016 African Nations Championship
9	26 January 2016	Stade Régional Nyamirambo, Kigali, Rwanda	Niger	3–0	5–0	2016 African Nations Championship

== Honours ==
Espérance de Tunis

- Tunisian Ligue Professionnelle 1: 2013–14

Étoile du Sahel

- Tunisian Ligue Professionnelle 1: 2015–16

Al-Ittihad

- Crown Prince Cup: 2016–17
- King Cup: 2018

Ahed

- AFC Cup: 2019
- Lebanese Premier League: 2021–22
- Lebanese Super Cup: 2019
