= Oupa Manyisa =

South African soccer player

Personal information
- Full name: Oupa Matthews Manyisa
- Date of birth: 30 July 1988 (age 38)
- Place of birth: Johannesburg, South Africa
- Height: 1.65 m (5 ft 5 in)
- Position: Central midfielder

Youth career
- Napoli FC (South Africa)
- PJ Stars
- Africa Sports Youth Academy

Senior career*
Years	Team	Apps	(Gls)
2008–2017	Orlando Pirates	163	(14)
2017–2020	Mamelodi Sundowns	30	(1)
2020	TTM	0	(0)
2021	Chippa United	1	(0)
2021–2023	Platinum City Rovers	27	(0)

International career^{‡}
2011–2017	South Africa	31	(1)
- * Club domestic league appearances and goals as of 1 August 2023 ‡ National team caps and goals as of 23 January 2015

Oupa Manyisa (born 30 July 1988) is a South African former soccer player who played as a central midfielder.

He started his senior career with Orlando Pirates F.C. and went on to become a crowd pleaser and one of the key players in the squad, helping them dominate local football for two consecutive seasons, winning 2 trebles, also being runners up on the CAF Champions League and Confederation Cup. After spending 9 seasons and making over 160 appearances for the Sea Robbers, Oupa set out to get a new challenge, much to the disappointment of the fans. He left Orlando Pirates F.C for Mamelodi Sundowns F.C in 2017, but failed to command a place in the starting 11, mostly because of picking up injuries and facing stiff competition in the team. Since then, the injuries have not stopped and he saw himself being released just 3 seasons later.

== Early career ==
Oupa played for many clubs at youth level; he started his youth career at Napoli FC (SA amateur side) when he was seven, and nine years later he joined PJ Stars. He also trained with Africa Sports Youth Academy under Harold Legodi, who played an instrumental role in developing his talent. Legodi helped Manyisa to have trials at big English clubs such as Chelsea, Manchester United, Blackburn Rovers and French sides in Caen and Strasbourg.

== Club career ==
=== Orlando Pirates ===
Manyisa joined Orlando Pirates in 2008 due to being scouted, he immediately impressed the coaching staff. "Ace", as he is known as in the football pitch, had a great 2010/11 season forming one of the best midfield partnership with Andile Jali. In that season he helped Pirates win the first-ever domestic Treble in PSL history. Oupa scored the only goal which was a cracker outside the 18-yard area against bitter rivals Kaizer Chiefs in the final of the MTN8 which he scored in extra time. Their stellar partnership proved to be good again when they won another domestic treble. Oupa has enjoyed good football from then being a force to be reckoned in the Pirates starting line-up. Ace holds the record of most appearance in a season for Orlando Pirates alongside Senzo Meyiwa which he achieved in the 2013/14 season. He played 51 out of 53 matches and this was due to their long run in the CAF Champions League. On 9 August 2014 Oupa scored a penalty in a league opener against Moroka Swallows which they lost 2–1. On 13 August Oupa scored a brace in a 2–2 draw against Bloemfontein Celtic.

=== Mamelodi Sundowns ===
Manyisa joined rivals Mamelodi Sundowns from Orlando Pirates on a three-year deal.

=== Late career ===
He went on to join 1st time campaigners in the Premier Soccer League, TTM F.C. but his contract was terminated just a month after joining, without even kicking the ball. The club sited financial issues, as Oupa Manyisa was getting a hefty salary.

After spending half a season clubless, he was signed by Chippa United for the rest of the 20/21 season.

He then spent two years in second-tier club Platinum City Rovers.

== International career ==
Manyisa made his debut for the South Africa national football team in a 0–0 draw with Sierra Leone on 8 October 2011. He represented Bafana Bafana at the 2015 Africa Cup of Nations and scored his first international goal during a 1–1 draw with Senegal during the group stage.

=== International goals ===
Scores and results list South Africa's goal tally first.

Goal	Date	Venue	Opponent	Score	Result	Competition
1.	23 January 2015	Estadio de Mongomo, Mongomo, Gabon	Senegal	1–0	1–1	2015 Africa Cup of Nations

== Honours ==
Orlando Pirates F.C.

- South African Premier Division: 2010-11, 2011-12
- Nedbank Cup: 2010-11, 2013-14
- MTN 8: 2010, 2011
- Telkom Knockout: 2011

Mamelodi Sundowns F.C.

- South African Premier Division: 2017-18, 2018-19
- Telkom Knockout: 2019
