= Emmanuel Mbola =

Zambian footballer (born 1993)

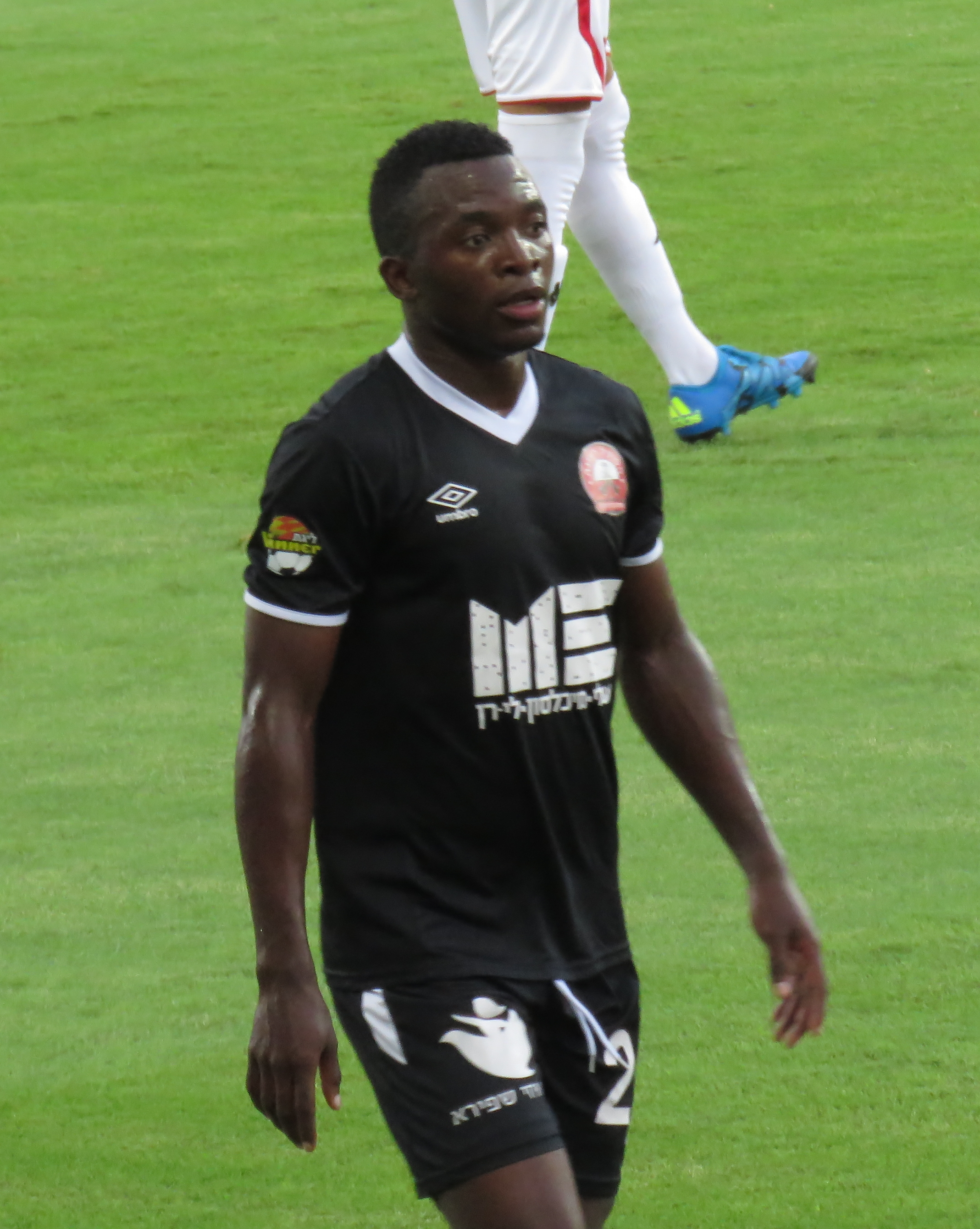
- Mbola playing for Hapoel Ra'anana in 2015

Personal information
- Date of birth: 10 May 1993 (age 33)
- Place of birth: Mansa, Zambia
- Height: 1.75 m (5 ft 9 in)
- Position: Left-back

Team information
- Current team: Nkana
- Number: 6

Youth career
- –2007: Mining Rangers

Senior career*
| Years | Team | Apps | (Gls) |
| 2008 | Mining Rangers | 7 | (0) |
| 2008 | Zanaco | 11 | (0) |
| 2009–2010 | Pyunik Yerevan | 23 | (0) |
| 2010–2013 | TP Mazembe | 36 | (1) |
| 2012–2013 | → Porto (loan) | 0 | (0) |
| 2013–2019 | Hapoel Ra'anana | 74 | (1) |
| 2019 | Bnei Sakhnin | 12 | (0) |
| 2021– | Nkana | 0 | (0) |

International career
| 2008–2016 | Zambia | 54 | (0) |
- * Club domestic league appearances and goals as of 21 March 2021 (UTC)

Emmanuel Mbola (born 10 May 1993), is a Zambian professional footballer who plays for Nkana. He is left-footed, and plays primarily at left-back. Between 2008 and 2016, he made 54 appearances for the Zambia national team.

== Club career ==
Born in Kabwe, Mbola began his career 2007 with Zambian club Mining Rangers and in 2008 joined another Zambian club Zanaco. In January 2009 he was scouted by Armenian club Pyunik Yerevan and joined them. He became the first Zambian to feature in the Uefa Champions League, representing his new club in a 0–0 draw against Dinamo Zagreb on 14 July 2009.

Linked in February 2010 with a move to English club Tottenham Hotspur and having been on trial at Arsenal in autumn 2010 he was involved in an ongoing transfer saga over his move to Pyunik Yerevan and a subsequent move to a Congolese club, TP Mazembe. This was resolved in September 2010 when FIFA ruled that the Armenian club had been wrong in arranging for Mbola to sign a professional contract when he was underage, which resulted in FIFA canceling the International Transfer Certificate (ITC) held by the Armenian club. This ruling meant that Mbola could officially join TP Mazembe.

He signed a one-year loan deal with Portuguese side Porto in February 2012. On 2 September 2013, Mbola signed for Israel Premier League side Hapoel Ra'anana.

== International career ==
Mbola is also a member of Zambia national team, having participated in 26 international matches since his debut in 2008 and is considered one of the most promising talents in Zambian and African football. Mbola is the second youngest player to have played a match in the Africa Cup of Nations.

== Achievements ==
- Armenian Cup with Pyunik Yerevan: 2009
- Armenian Premier League with Pyunik Yerevan: 2009
