= Stéphane Nater =

Tunisian footballer (born 1984)

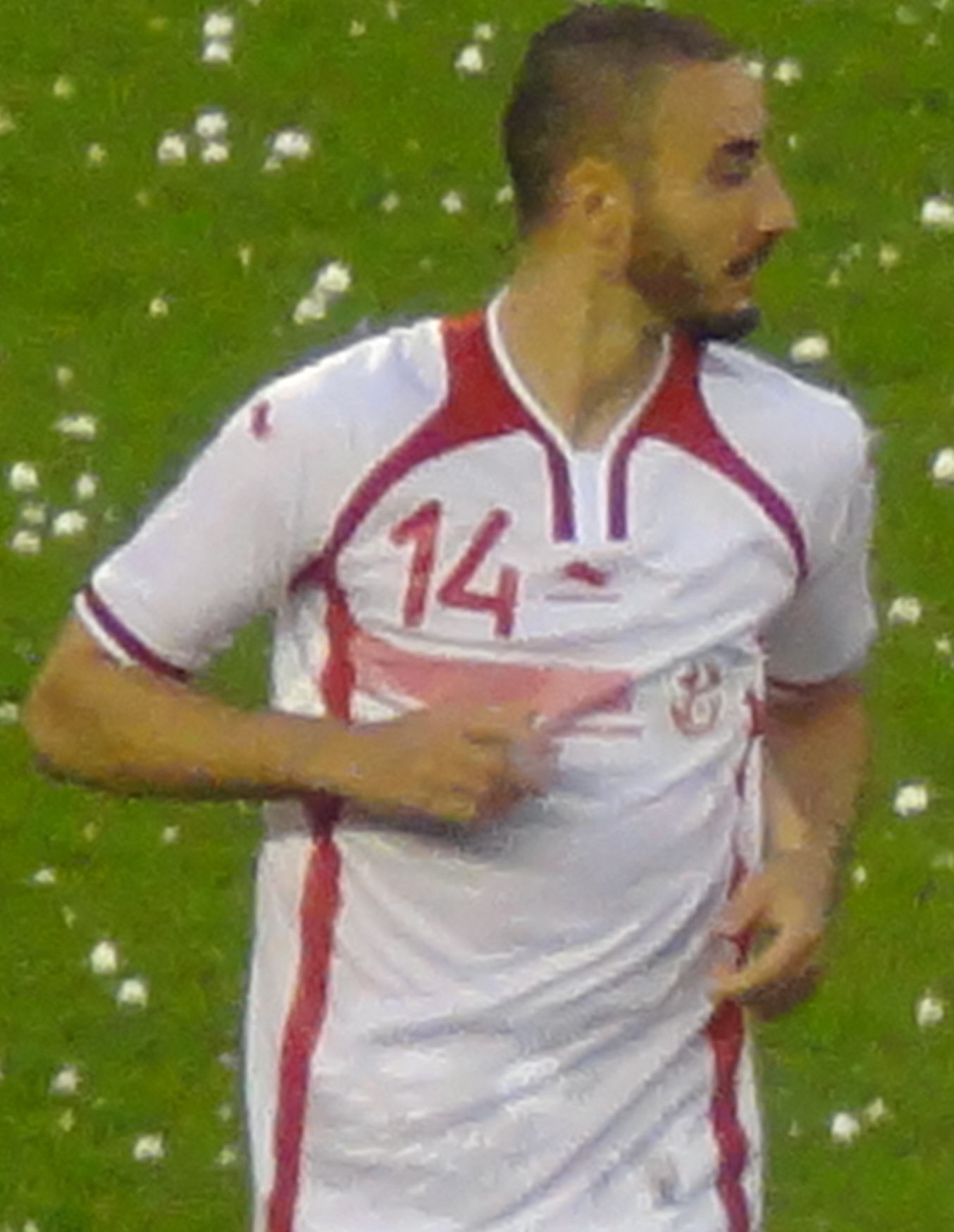
- Stéphane Nater, 2014

Personal information
- Full name: Stéphane Houcine Nater
- Date of birth: 20 January 1984 (age 42)
- Place of birth: Troyes, France
- Height: 1.86 m (6 ft 1 in)
- Position: Midfielder

Team information
- Current team: Balzers
- Number: 5

Youth career
- Balzers
- Schaan
- –2002: St. Gallen
- 2002–2004: Vaduz

Senior career*
Years	Team	Apps	(Gls)
2002–2004	Vaduz	2	(0)
2004–2008	Chur 97	0	(0)
2007–2008	→ Biaschesi (loan)	26	(0)
2008–2010	Schaffhausen	53	(2)
2010–2012	Servette	31	(3)
2012–2014	St. Gallen	63	(1)
2014–2016	Club Africain	38	(1)
2016–2017	Étoile du Sahel	9	(0)
2017–2020	Rapperswil-Jona	43	(1)
2020–2021	Balzers	11	(1)
2021–2022	YF Juventus	18	(0)
2022–	Balzers	55	(1)

International career^{‡}
2014–2015	Tunisia	12	(0)
- * Club domestic league appearances and goals as of 27 April 2024 ‡ National team caps and goals as of 27 March 2015

Stéphane Houcine Nater (born 20 January 1984) is a footballer who plays as a midfielder for Balzers. Born in France, he represented Tunisia at international level, and also holds Swiss citizenship having spent much of his upbringing there.

== Club career ==
Nater was transferred to St. Gallen, where he was formed as a youth player, after two years at Servette FC, where he played one season in the Challenge League and one season in the top flight.

In the summer of 2014, he joined Club Africain for his first spell in the Tunisian league, signing a two-year deal.

== International career ==
Nater has joined to the Tunisian national team in November 2013. He was an unused substitute in the final 2014 FIFA World Cup qualifying match against Cameroon. His international debut was in a friendly match against Colombia on 5 March 2014.
