= Carlos Lima =

Cape Verdean footballer (born 1983)

Calú
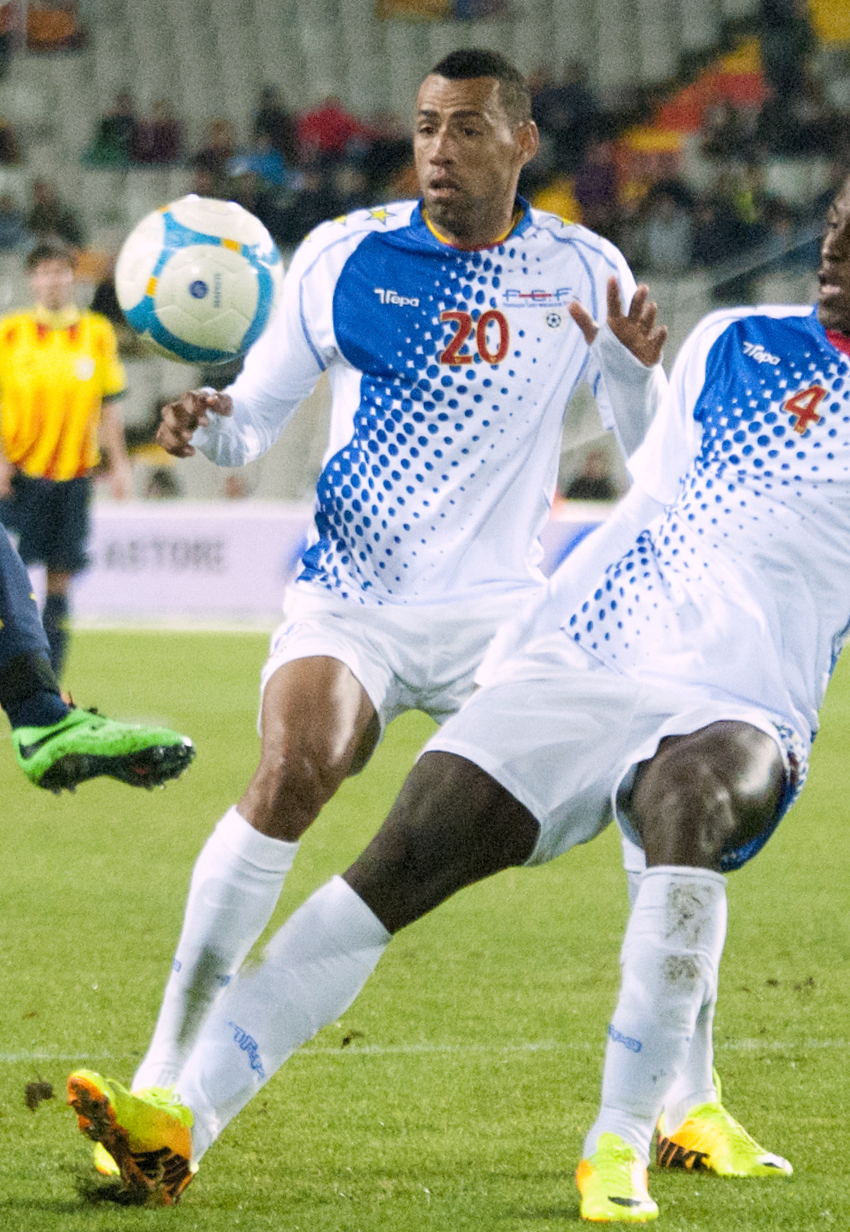

Personal information
- Full name: Carlos Alberto Silva Lima
- Date of birth: 20 September 1983 (age 43)
- Place of birth: Praia, Cape Verde
- Height: 1.88 m (6 ft 2 in)
- Position: Midfielder

Senior career*
Years	Team	Apps	(Gls)
2001–2012	Mindelense	86	(20)
2012–2015	Progresso Sambizanga	78	(26)
2015–2016	Zimbru Chișinău	23	(4)
2016–2017	Académica		
2017	Gil Vicente	15	(0)

International career
2013–2016	Cape Verde	21	(0)
- * Club domestic league appearances and goals

Carlos Alberto Silva Lima (born 20 September 1983), commonly known as Calú, is a Cape Verdean former professional footballer who played as a midfielder.

== Club career ==
Calú began his career in Cape Verde with Mindelense. He remained with the club from 2001 to 2012.

He then joined Girabola team Progresso Sambizanga ahead of the 2012–13 season.

In 2015, Calú completed a transfer to Zimbru Chișinău of Moldova. He scored four goals in twenty-three appearances for Zimbru before returning to Cape Verde to join Académica.

On 31 January 2017, Calú signed for LigaPro side Gil Vicente in Portugal.

== International career ==
Calú is a member of the Cape Verde football team at international level. He currently has nineteen caps.

== Career statistics ==
=== Club ===
As of 3 February 2017.

Club statistics
Club	Season	League			Cup (Note: Includes the Taça de Portugal)		League Cup (Note: Includes the Taça da Liga)		Continental		Other		Total	
Club	Season	Division	Apps	Goals	Apps	Goals	Apps	Goals	Apps	Goals	Apps	Goals	Apps	Goals
Gil Vicente	2016–17	LigaPro	0	0	—		—		—		0	0	0	0
Gil Vicente	Total		0	0	—		—		—		0	0	0	0
Career total			0	0	—		—		—		0	0	0	0

=== International ===
As of 3 February 2017.

National team	Year	Apps	Goals
Cape Verde
Cape Verde	2013	2	0
Cape Verde	2014	6	0
Cape Verde	2015	8	0
Cape Verde	2016	3	0
Cape Verde	2017	0	0
Total		19	0

== Honours ==
=== Club ===
Mindelense

- Cape Verdean Football Championship (1): 2011
- São Vicente Island League (3): 2005–06, 2008–09, 2010–11
- São Vicente Association Cup (5): 2002–03, 2004–05, 2005–06, 2007–08, 2008–09
- São Vicente Cup (1): 2007–08
- São Vicente Super Cup (2): 2005–06, 2008–09
