= Jean Kasusula =

Congolese footballer (born 1982)

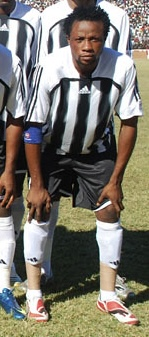
- Kasusula with TP Mazembe

Personal information
- Full name: Jean Kiritsho Kasusula
- Date of birth: 5 August 1982 (age 44)
- Place of birth: Kisangani, Zaire
- Height: 1.75 m (5 ft 9 in)
- Position: Left-back

Senior career*
Years	Team	Apps	(Gls)
2001	CS Makiso		
2002–2003	AS Kabasha		
2004	Rayon Sports		
2004–2020	TP Mazembe		

International career
2011–2015	DR Congo	41	(0)
- * Club domestic league appearances and goals

Jean Kiritsho Kasusula (born 5 August 1982) is a Congolese politician and former professional footballer who played as a left-back.

In May 2015, it was announced that Kasusula and ex-teammate Robert Kidiaba would stand for the National Party for Democracy and Development at forthcoming elections.

== Club career ==
Kasusula amassed 250 appearances for TP Mazembe from 2004 to 2020 and helped them win three CAF Champions Leagues. He scored at the 2009 FIFA Club World Cup.

== International career ==
Kasusula played for the DR Congo national team from 2011 to 2015, appearing 41 times without scoring. He played at the 2013 and 2015 Africa Cup of Nations, the latter of which DR Congo finished third.

== Career statistics ==
=== International ===
Appearances and goals by national team and year
National team	Year	Apps	Goals
DR Congo	2011	8	0
DR Congo	2012	9	0
DR Congo	2013	8	0
DR Congo	2014	8	0
DR Congo	2015	8	0
Total		41	0

== Honours ==
DR Congo

- Africa Cup of Nations: third place 2015
