= Carlitos (footballer, born April 1985) =

Cape Verdean footballer (born 1985)

Personal information
- Full name: Carlos Emanuel Soares Tavares
- Date of birth: 23 April 1985 (age 41)
- Place of birth: Almada, Portugal
- Height: 1.75 m (5 ft 9 in)
- Position: Full-back

Youth career
- 1995–2000: Atlético Arrentela
- 2000–2003: Amora

Senior career*
| Years | Team | Apps | (Gls) |
| 2003–2005 | Amora | 62 | (0) |
| 2005 | Barreirense | 12 | (1) |
| 2005–2006 | Odivelas | 17 | (0) |
| 2006 | Barreirense | 6 | (1) |
| 2007 | Imortal | 11 | (2) |
| 2007–2008 | Portimonense | 18 | (0) |
| 2008–2009 | Chaves | 12 | (0) |
| 2009–2010 | Camacha | 9 | (0) |
| 2010–2011 | Atlético | 29 | (0) |
| 2011–2015 | AEL Limassol | 98 | (0) |
| 2015 | Iraklis | 5 | (0) |
| 2016–2017 | Omonia | 42 | (1) |
| 2018 | Real Massamá | 6 | (0) |
| 2018–2020 | Casa Pia | 27 | (0) |
| Total | | 354 | (5) |

International career
| 2012–2018 | Cape Verde | 33 | (0) |
- * Club domestic league appearances and goals

Carlos Emanuel Soares Tavares (born 23 April 1985), known as Carlitos, is a former professional footballer who played as a right or left-back.

== Club career ==
Born in Almada, Setúbal District, Carlitos played the vast majority of his career in the lower levels of Portuguese football. His first Segunda Liga experience occurred with Portimonense S.C. in the 2007–08 season.

In summer 2011, Carlitos moved to the Cypriot First Division, where he spent several years in service of AEL Limassol. On 3 July 2015, he signed a two-year contract with Super League Greece club Iraklis FC.

Carlitos returned to Cyprus and its top flight on 4 January 2016, when he joined AC Omonia. He scored his only goal for the side roughly one year later, when he headed home in a 2–1 away loss against Apollon Limassol FC, and after 52 competitive appearances he was released on 26 May 2017.

Before retiring at age 35, Carlitos represented Real S.C. and Casa Pia A.C. in the Portuguese second tier.

== Personal life ==
Carlitos' cousin, Nani, was also a footballer. He represented mainly Sporting CP, Manchester United and Portugal.

== Career statistics ==
As of match played on 21 May 2017

| Club | Season | League | | | Cup | | Other | | Total | |
| Club | Season | Division | Apps | Goals | Apps | Goals | Apps | Goals | Apps | Goals |
|---|---|---|---|---|---|---|---|---|---|---|
| Amora | 2002–03 | Segunda Divisão | 8 | 0 | 0 | 0 | — | | 8 | 0 |
| Amora | 2003–04 | Segunda Divisão | 36 | 0 | 1 | 1 | — | | 37 | 1 |
| Amora | 2004–05 | Segunda Divisão | 18 | 0 | 2 | 0 | — | | 20 | 0 |
| Amora | Total | | 62 | 0 | 3 | 1 | — | | 65 | 1 |
| Barreirense | 2004–05 | Segunda Divisão | 12 | 1 | 0 | 0 | — | | 12 | 1 |
| Barreirense | Total | | 12 | 1 | 0 | 0 | — | | 12 | 1 |
| Odivelas | 2005–06 | Segunda Divisão | 17 | 0 | 1 | 0 | — | | 18 | 0 |
| Odivelas | Total | | 17 | 0 | 1 | 0 | — | | 18 | 0 |
| Imortal | 2006–07 | Segunda Divisão | 11 | 2 | 0 | 0 | — | | 11 | 2 |
| Imortal | Total | | 11 | 2 | 0 | 0 | — | | 11 | 2 |
| Barreirense | 2006–07 | Segunda Divisão | 6 | 1 | 1 | 0 | — | | 7 | 1 |
| Barreirense | Total | | 6 | 1 | 1 | 0 | — | | 7 | 1 |
| Portimonense | 2007–08 | Segunda Liga | 18 | 0 | 3 | 0 | — | | 21 | 0 |
| Portimonense | Total | | 18 | 0 | 3 | 0 | — | | 21 | 0 |
| Camacha | 2009–10 | Segunda Divisão | 9 | 0 | 2 | 0 | — | | 11 | 0 |
| Camacha | Total | | 9 | 0 | 2 | 0 | — | | 11 | 0 |
| Atlético | 2010–11 | Segunda Divisão | 29 | 0 | 4 | 0 | — | | 33 | 0 |
| Atlético | Total | | 29 | 0 | 4 | 0 | — | | 33 | 0 |
| AEL Limassol | 2011–12 | Cypriot First Division | 29 | 0 | 7 | 0 | — | | 36 | 0 |
| AEL Limassol | 2012–13 | Cypriot First Division | 16 | 0 | 4 | 0 | 11 (Note: Appearances in UEFA Champions League and UEFA Europa League) | 0 | 31 | 0 |
| AEL Limassol | 2013–14 | Cypriot First Division | 31 | 0 | 2 | 0 | — | | 33 | 0 |
| AEL Limassol | 2014–15 | Cypriot First Division | 22 | 0 | 5 | 0 | 4 | 0 | 31 | 0 |
| AEL Limassol | Total | | 98 | 0 | 18 | 0 | 15 | 0 | 131 | 0 |
| Iraklis | 2015–16 | Super League Greece | 5 | 0 | 0 | 0 | — | | 5 | 0 |
| Iraklis | Total | | 5 | 0 | 0 | 0 | — | | 5 | 0 |
| Omonia | 2015–16 | Cypriot First Division | 17 | 0 | 4 | 0 | — | | 21 | 0 |
| Omonia | 2016–17 | Cypriot First Division | 25 | 1 | 2 | 0 | 4 | 0 | 31 | 1 |
| Omonia | Total | | 42 | 1 | 6 | 0 | 4 | 0 | 52 | 1 |
| Career total | | | 309 | 5 | 38 | 1 | 19 | 0 | 366 | 6 |

== Honours ==
Barreirense

- Segunda Divisão: 2004–05

AEL Limassol

- Cypriot First Division: 2011–12
