= Jackson Mabokgwane =

South African soccer player

Personal information
- Full name: Thapelo Jackson Mabokgwane
- Date of birth: 19 January 1988 (age 38)
- Place of birth: Polokwane, South Africa
- Height: 1.83 m (6 ft 0 in)
- Position: Goalkeeper

Team information
- Current team: Richards Bay
- Number: 1

Youth career
- School of Excellence
- Bidvest Wits

Senior career*
Years	Team	Apps	(Gls)
2007–2012	Mamelodi Sundowns	2	(0)
2011–2012	→ Platinum Stars (loan)	15	(0)
2012–2014	Bidvest Wits	9	(0)
2014–2016	Mpumalanga Black Aces	11	(0)
2016	Cape Town City	29	(0)
2016–2019	Orlando Pirates	26	(0)
2019–2021	Bloemfontein Celtic	37	(0)
2021–2022	Royal AM	0	(0)
2022	Baroka	11	(0)
2023	Black Leopards	12	(0)
2023–	Richards Bay	5	(0)

International career^{‡}
2015–2016	South Africa	11	(0)
- * Club domestic league appearances and goals as of 8 April 2024 ‡ National team caps and goals as of 13 November 2022

Jackson Mabokgwane (born 19 January 1988) is a South African soccer player who plays as a goalkeeper for Richards Bay and formerly the South Africa national soccer team.
