= Mukuka Mulenga =

Zambian footballer (born 1993)

Personal information
- Date of birth: 6 July 1993 (age 33)
- Place of birth: Kitwe, Zambia
- Height: 1.82 m (5 ft 11 1/2 in)
- Position: Midfielder

Team information
- Current team: Power Dynamos
- Number: 30

Senior career*
Years	Team	Apps	(Gls)
2009–2010	Kabwe Warriors		
2010–2013	Power Dynamos		
2013–2016	Mamelodi Sundowns	0	(0)
2014–2015	→ Bloemfontein Celtic (loan)	19	(0)
2016	→ Cape Town City (loan)	5	(0)
2019–	Power Dynamos		

International career^{‡}
2012–2015	Zambia	26	(1)
- * Club domestic league appearances and goals as of 6 October 2022 ‡ National team caps and goals as of 6 October 2022

Mukuka Mulenga (born 6 July 1993) is a Zambian international footballer who plays for Power Dynamos in the Zambian MTN Super League, as a midfielder.

== Career ==
Mulenga has played club football for Power Dynamos and Kabwe Warriors.

He made his international debut for Zambia in 2012. and was a participant at the 2013 Africa Cup of Nations.

== Career statistics ==
=== International ===
Appearances and goals by national team and year
National team	Year	Apps	Goals
Zambia	2012	3	0
Zambia	2013	14	0
Zambia	2014	3	1
Zambia	2015	6	0
Total		26	1

Scores and results list Zambia's goal tally first, score column indicates score after each Mulenga goal.

List of international goals scored by Mukuka Mulenga
No.	Date	Venue	Opponent	Score	Result	Competition
1	31 August 2014	National Heroes Stadium, Lusaka, Zambia	Sudan	3–1	3–1	Friendly
