= Patrick Ngoma =

Zambian footballer (born 1997)

Personal information
- Full name: Patrick Ngoma
- Date of birth: May 21, 1997 (age 29)
- Place of birth: Zambia
- Position: Forward

Team information
- Current team: Nakambala Leopards

Senior career*
Years	Team	Apps	(Gls)
2013–2015	Red Arrows	20	(3)
2015–2016	Ittihad Alexandria	9	(0)
2016–2019	Red Arrows		
2019–	Nakambala Leopards		

International career
2015–	Zambia	3	(0)
- * Club domestic league appearances and goals as of 21 May 2015

Patrick Ngoma (born 21 May 1997) is a Zambian association football forward. He played for Nakambala Leopards and the Zambia national football team. He was part of the Zambia squad for the 2015 Africa Cup of Nations, and played in the final group match against Cape Verde as a substitute.
