= Robert Kidiaba =

Congolese footballer (born 1976)

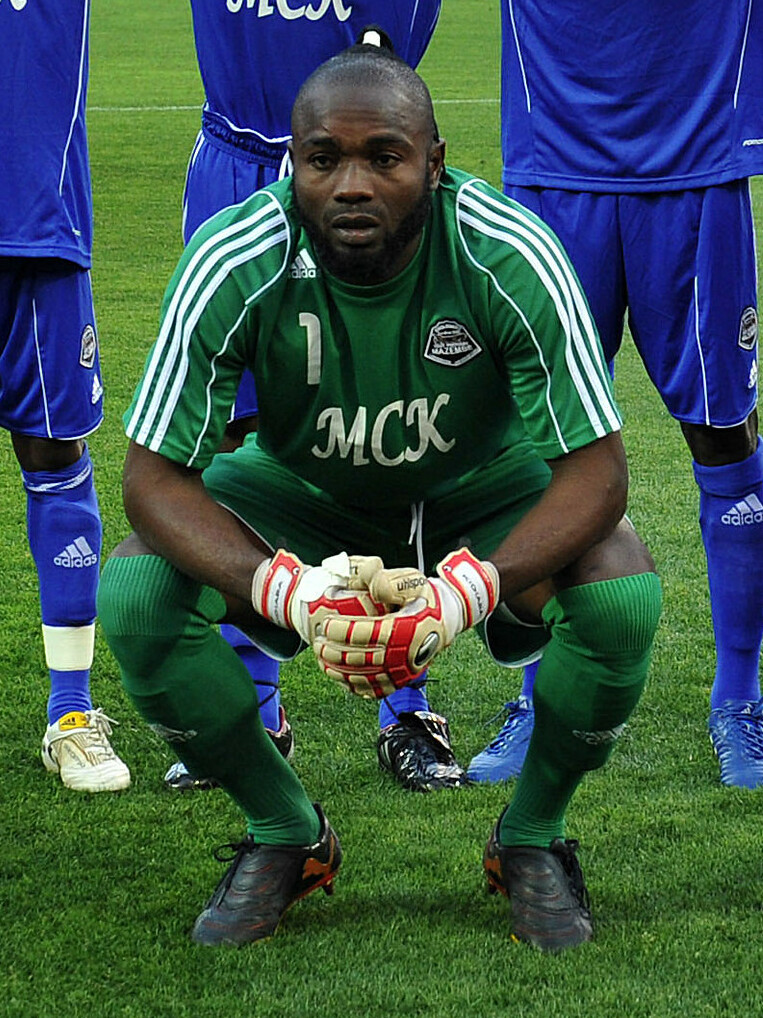
- Kidiaba with TP Mazembe in 2011

Personal information
- Full name: Robert Kidiaba Muteba
- Date of birth: 1 February 1976 (age 50)
- Place of birth: Lubumbashi, Zaire
- Height: 1.82 m (6 ft 0 in)
- Position: Goalkeeper

Senior career*
Years	Team	Apps	(Gls)
2001	AS Saint-Luc		
2002–2016	TP Mazembe	681	(0)

International career
2002–2015	DR Congo	61	(0)
- * Club domestic league appearances and goals

Robert Kidiaba Muteba (born 1 February 1976) is a Congolese politician and former professional footballer who played as a goalkeeper. He spent most of his club career with TP Mazembe, whilst at international level he collected 61 caps playing for the DR Congo national team.

== Club career ==
Born in Lubumbashi, Kidiaba played club football for AS Saint-Luc and TP Mazembe. With TP Mazembe he played at the 2009 FIFA Club World Cup and 2010 FIFA Club World Cup, making a total of five appearances in the tournament across both years. In 2010 he reached the final with Mazembe, who became the first club outside South America and Europe to reach a Club World Cup final.

== International career ==
Kidiaba made his international debut for the DR Congo national team in 2002, and has appeared for them in 11 FIFA World Cup qualifying matches. In December 2014 he announced he would retire from international duty after the 2015 Africa Cup of Nations, in January 2015 he was named in the 23-man squad for the tournament, and in February 2015 he indicated that he might not retire after the tournament.

== Political career ==
In May 2015 it was announced that Kidiaba and teammate Jean Kasusula would stand for the National Party for Democracy and Development at forthcoming elections.

He was elected a Member of Parliament for Haut-Katanga Province in January 2019.

== Personal life ==
Kidiaba works as an ambassador for the Peace One Day charity.

He is married and has three children.

He is "famed for the 'bum shuffle' goal celebration" which consists of "bouncing around his penalty area on his backside." The move is a fan favourite.

== Honours ==
TP Mazembe

- Linafoot champion 2001, 2006, 2007, 2009, 2011, 2012, 2013, 2014

DR Congo

- Africa Cup of Nations bronze: 2015
