= Christopher Munthali =

Zambian footballer (born 1991)

Personal information
- Date of birth: 8 October 1991 (age 35)
- Place of birth: Lusaka, Zambia
- Height: 1.85 m (6 ft 1 in)
- Position: Defender

Team information
- Current team: Lumwana Radiants

Senior career*
Years	Team	Apps	(Gls)
2010	Konkola Blades		
2011–2012	Power Dynamos		
2013–2014	Nkana		
2015	Power Dynamos		
2016–2017	Nkana		
2018–2019	Buildcon		
2019	Akhaa Ahli Aley	8	(0)
2020–	Lumwana Radiants	24	(1)

International career
2013–2016	Zambia	39	(2)
- * Club domestic league appearances and goals as of 22 September 2019

Christopher Munthali (born 8 October 1991) is a Zambian professional footballer who play as a defender for Lumwana Radiants.
