= Honour Janza =

Zambian football coach

Team information
- Current team: Namungo (manager)

Managerial career
- Years: Team
- 2010: Zambia
- 2014–2015: Zambia
- 2021–: Namungo
- 2022: Tanzania (caretaker)

Honour Janza is a Zambian football coach who is the manager of Tanzanian club Namungo.

== Career ==
Janza managed the Zambia national team, a position he took up in August 2014. He was manager at the 2015 Africa Cup of Nations, and criticized his own players following a 2–1 defeat by Tunisia. In March 2015 the Football Association of Zambia announced that were seeking a foreign replacement for Janza. Janza stated he felt "betrayed" by the FAZ. He was replaced by caretaker coach George Lwandamina in June 2015.

In December 2021 he became manager of Tanzanian club Namungo. In August 2022 he became caretaker manager of the Tanzania national team. He won the Tanzanian league coach of the month for September 2022.
