= 2017 FIFA Confederations Cup squads =

The following is a list of squads for each nation who competed at the 2017 FIFA Confederations Cup in Russia from 17 June to 2 July 2017, as a prelude to the 2018 FIFA World Cup. Each squad consisted of 23 players, three of which had to be goalkeepers. Replacement of injured players was permitted until 24 hours before the team's first game.

The age listed for each player is on 17 June 2017, the first day of the tournament. The number of caps listed for each player does not include any matches played after the start of the tournament. The club listed is the club for which the player last played a competitive match prior to the tournament. The nationality for each club reflects the national association (not the league) to which the club is affiliated.

== Group A ==
=== Mexico ===
Manager: (Colombia) Juan Carlos Osorio

Jesús Corona withdrew from the squad due to injury and was replaced by Jürgen Damm.

No.	Pos.	Player	Date of birth (age)	Caps	Goals	Club
1	GK	Rodolfo Cota	3 July 1987 (aged 29)	1	0	(Mexican Football Federation) Guadalajara
2	DF	Néstor Araujo	21 August 1991 (aged 25)	15	2	(Mexican Football Federation) Santos Laguna
3	DF	Carlos Salcedo	29 September 1993 (aged 23)	11	0	(Italian Football Federation) Fiorentina
4	DF	Rafael Márquez (captain)	13 February 1979 (aged 38)	139	18	(Mexican Football Federation) Atlas
5	DF	Diego Reyes	19 September 1992 (aged 24)	45	1	(Royal Spanish Football Federation) Espanyol
6	MF	Jonathan dos Santos	26 April 1990 (aged 27)	24	0	(Royal Spanish Football Federation) Villarreal
7	MF	Miguel Layún	25 June 1988 (aged 28)	51	5	(Portuguese Football Federation) Porto
8	FW	Marco Fabián	21 July 1989 (aged 27)	35	8	(German Football Association) Eintracht Frankfurt
9	FW	Raúl Jiménez	5 May 1991 (aged 26)	52	11	(Portuguese Football Federation) Benfica
10	MF	Giovani dos Santos	11 May 1989 (aged 28)	96	18	(United States Soccer Federation) LA Galaxy
11	MF	Carlos Vela	1 March 1989 (aged 28)	55	17	(Royal Spanish Football Federation) Real Sociedad
12	GK	Alfredo Talavera	18 September 1982 (aged 34)	26	0	(Mexican Football Federation) Toluca
13	GK	Guillermo Ochoa	13 July 1985 (aged 31)	80	0	(Royal Spanish Football Federation) Granada
14	FW	Javier Hernández	1 June 1988 (aged 29)	92	47	(German Football Association) Bayer Leverkusen
15	DF	Héctor Moreno	17 January 1988 (aged 29)	79	2	(Royal Dutch Football Association) PSV Eindhoven
16	MF	Héctor Herrera	19 April 1990 (aged 27)	54	4	(Portuguese Football Federation) Porto
17	MF	Jürgen Damm	7 November 1992 (aged 24)	6	1	(Mexican Football Federation) UANL
18	MF	Andrés Guardado	28 September 1986 (aged 30)	136	24	(Royal Dutch Football Association) PSV Eindhoven
19	FW	Oribe Peralta	12 January 1984 (aged 33)	56	23	(Mexican Football Federation) América
20	MF	Javier Aquino	11 February 1990 (aged 27)	43	0	(Mexican Football Federation) UANL
21	DF	Luis Reyes	3 April 1991 (aged 26)	4	0	(Mexican Football Federation) Atlas
22	FW	Hirving Lozano	30 July 1995 (aged 21)	16	2	(Mexican Football Federation) Pachuca
23	DF	Oswaldo Alanís	18 March 1989 (aged 28)	16	2	(Mexican Football Federation) Guadalajara

=== New Zealand ===
Manager: (England) Anthony Hudson

No.	Pos.	Player	Date of birth (age)	Caps	Goals	Club
1	GK	Stefan Marinovic	7 October 1991 (aged 25)	16	0	(German Football Association) SpVgg Unterhaching
2	DF	Sam Brotherton	2 October 1996 (aged 20)	7	0	(The Football Association) Sunderland
3	DF	Deklan Wynne	20 March 1995 (aged 22)	9	0	(Canadian Soccer Association) Whitecaps FC 2
4	DF	Themistoklis Tzimopoulos	20 November 1985 (aged 31)	11	1	(Hellenic Football Federation) PAS Giannina
5	DF	Michael Boxall	18 August 1988 (aged 28)	24	0	(South African Football Association) SuperSport United
6	MF	Bill Tuiloma	23 March 1995 (aged 22)	18	0	(French Football Federation) Marseille
7	FW	Kosta Barbarouses	19 February 1990 (aged 27)	39	3	(New Zealand Football) Wellington Phoenix
8	MF	Michael McGlinchey	7 January 1987 (aged 30)	44	4	(New Zealand Football) Wellington Phoenix
9	FW	Chris Wood (captain)	7 December 1991 (aged 25)	49	19	(The Football Association) Leeds United
10	FW	Shane Smeltz	29 September 1981 (aged 35)	55	24	(Football Association of Indonesia) Borneo
11	FW	Marco Rojas	5 November 1991 (aged 25)	34	5	(Football Australia) Melbourne Victory
12	GK	Glen Moss	19 January 1983 (aged 34)	29	0	(Football Australia) Newcastle Jets
13	FW	Monty Patterson	9 December 1996 (aged 20)	11	1	(The Football Association) Ipswich Town
14	MF	Ryan Thomas	20 December 1994 (aged 22)	11	2	(Royal Dutch Football Association) PEC Zwolle
15	MF	Clayton Lewis	12 February 1997 (aged 20)	9	0	(New Zealand Football) Auckland City
16	DF	Dane Ingham	6 August 1999 (aged 17)	2	0	(Football Australia) Brisbane Roar
17	DF	Tom Doyle	30 June 1992 (aged 24)	5	0	(New Zealand Football) Wellington Phoenix
18	DF	Kip Colvey	15 March 1994 (aged 23)	10	0	(United States Soccer Federation) Reno 1868
19	FW	Alex Rufer	12 June 1996 (aged 21)	3	0	(New Zealand Football) Wellington Phoenix
20	DF	Tommy Smith	31 March 1990 (aged 27)	32	2	(The Football Association) Ipswich Town
21	DF	Storm Roux	13 January 1993 (aged 24)	7	0	(Football Australia) Central Coast Mariners
22	DF	Andrew Durante	3 May 1982 (aged 35)	17	0	(New Zealand Football) Wellington Phoenix
23	GK	Tamati Williams	19 January 1984 (aged 33)	1	0	(Royal Dutch Football Association) RKC Waalwijk

=== Portugal ===
Manager: Fernando Santos

No.	Pos.	Player	Date of birth (age)	Caps	Goals	Club
1	GK	Rui Patrício	15 February 1988 (aged 29)	59	0	(Portuguese Football Federation) Sporting CP
2	DF	Bruno Alves	27 November 1981 (aged 35)	90	11	(Italian Football Federation) Cagliari
3	DF	Pepe	26 February 1983 (aged 34)	82	4	(Royal Spanish Football Federation) Real Madrid
4	DF	Luís Neto	26 May 1988 (aged 29)	13	0	(Russian Football Union) Zenit Saint Petersburg
5	DF	Raphaël Guerreiro	22 December 1993 (aged 23)	18	2	(German Football Association) Borussia Dortmund
6	DF	José Fonte	22 December 1983 (aged 33)	23	0	(The Football Association) West Ham United
7	FW	Cristiano Ronaldo (captain)	5 February 1985 (aged 32)	139	73	(Royal Spanish Football Federation) Real Madrid
8	MF	João Moutinho	8 September 1986 (aged 30)	98	7	(French Football Federation) Monaco
9	FW	André Silva	6 November 1995 (aged 21)	8	7	(Portuguese Football Federation) Porto
10	MF	Bernardo Silva	10 August 1994 (aged 22)	12	1	(French Football Federation) Monaco
11	DF	Nélson Semedo	16 November 1993 (aged 23)	4	0	(Portuguese Football Federation) Benfica
12	GK	José Sá	17 January 1993 (aged 24)	0	0	(Portuguese Football Federation) Porto
13	MF	Danilo Pereira	9 September 1991 (aged 25)	19	1	(Portuguese Football Federation) Porto
14	MF	William Carvalho	7 April 1992 (aged 25)	33	1	(Portuguese Football Federation) Sporting CP
15	MF	André Gomes	30 July 1993 (aged 23)	21	0	(Royal Spanish Football Federation) Barcelona
16	MF	Pizzi	6 October 1989 (aged 27)	7	2	(Portuguese Football Federation) Benfica
17	FW	Nani	17 November 1986 (aged 30)	108	23	(Royal Spanish Football Federation) Valencia
18	FW	Gelson Martins	11 May 1995 (aged 22)	6	0	(Portuguese Football Federation) Sporting CP
19	DF	Eliseu	1 October 1983 (aged 33)	21	1	(Portuguese Football Federation) Benfica
20	FW	Ricardo Quaresma	26 September 1983 (aged 33)	65	8	(Turkish Football Federation) Beşiktaş
21	DF	Cédric	31 August 1991 (aged 25)	19	0	(The Football Association) Southampton
22	GK	Beto	1 May 1982 (aged 35)	11	0	(Portuguese Football Federation) Sporting CP
23	MF	Adrien Silva	15 March 1989 (aged 28)	16	0	(Portuguese Football Federation) Sporting CP

=== Russia ===
Manager: Stanislav Cherchesov

No.	Pos.	Player	Date of birth (age)	Caps	Goals	Club
1	GK	Igor Akinfeev (captain)	8 April 1986 (aged 31)	98	0	(Russian Football Union) CSKA Moscow
2	DF	Igor Smolnikov	8 August 1988 (aged 28)	20	0	(Russian Football Union) Zenit Saint Petersburg
3	DF	Roman Shishkin	27 January 1987 (aged 30)	15	0	(Russian Football Union) Krasnodar
4	MF	Yury Gazinsky	20 July 1989 (aged 27)	5	0	(Russian Football Union) Krasnodar
5	DF	Viktor Vasin	6 October 1988 (aged 28)	6	2	(Russian Football Union) CSKA Moscow
6	DF	Georgi Dzhikiya	21 November 1993 (aged 23)	1	0	(Russian Football Union) Spartak Moscow
7	FW	Dmitry Poloz	12 July 1991 (aged 25)	10	1	(Russian Football Union) Rostov
8	MF	Denis Glushakov	27 January 1987 (aged 30)	51	5	(Russian Football Union) Spartak Moscow
9	FW	Fyodor Smolov	9 February 1990 (aged 27)	21	7	(Russian Football Union) Krasnodar
10	MF	Ruslan Kambolov	1 January 1990 (aged 27)	2	0	(Russian Football Union) Rubin Kazan
11	FW	Aleksandr Bukharov	12 March 1985 (aged 32)	6	1	(Russian Football Union) Rostov
12	GK	Vladimir Gabulov	19 October 1983 (aged 33)	10	0	(Russian Football Union) Arsenal Tula
13	DF	Fyodor Kudryashov	5 April 1987 (aged 30)	8	0	(Russian Football Union) Rostov
14	DF	Ilya Kutepov	29 July 1993 (aged 23)	4	0	(Russian Football Union) Spartak Moscow
15	MF	Aleksei Miranchuk	17 October 1995 (aged 21)	9	2	(Russian Football Union) Lokomotiv Moscow
16	GK	Guilherme	12 December 1985 (aged 31)	2	0	(Russian Football Union) Lokomotiv Moscow
17	MF	Aleksandr Golovin	30 May 1996 (aged 21)	12	2	(Russian Football Union) CSKA Moscow
18	MF	Yuri Zhirkov	20 August 1983 (aged 33)	75	2	(Russian Football Union) Zenit Saint Petersburg
19	MF	Aleksandr Samedov	19 July 1984 (aged 32)	39	5	(Russian Football Union) Spartak Moscow
20	FW	Maksim Kanunnikov	14 July 1991 (aged 25)	10	0	(Russian Football Union) Rubin Kazan
21	MF	Aleksandr Yerokhin	13 October 1989 (aged 27)	8	0	(Russian Football Union) Rostov
22	MF	Dmitri Tarasov	18 March 1987 (aged 30)	5	1	(Russian Football Union) Lokomotiv Moscow
23	DF	Dmitri Kombarov	22 January 1987 (aged 30)	44	2	(Russian Football Union) Spartak Moscow

== Group B ==
=== Australia ===
Manager: Ange Postecoglou

Brad Smith and Mile Jedinak withdrew from the squad due to injury and were replaced by Alex Gersbach and James Jeggo, respectively.

No.	Pos.	Player	Date of birth (age)	Caps	Goals	Club
1	GK	Mathew Ryan	8 April 1992 (aged 25)	32	0	(Royal Belgian Football Association) Genk
2	DF	Miloš Degenek	28 April 1994 (aged 23)	9	0	(Japan Football Association) Yokohama F. Marinos
3	DF	Alex Gersbach	8 May 1997 (aged 20)	2	0	(Norwegian Football Federation) Rosenborg
4	FW	Tim Cahill	6 December 1979 (aged 37)	97	48	(Football Australia) Melbourne City
5	MF	Mark Milligan (captain)	4 August 1985 (aged 31)	56	5	(United Arab Emirates Football Association) Baniyas
6	DF	Dylan McGowan	6 August 1991 (aged 25)	1	0	(Football Australia) Adelaide United
7	FW	Mathew Leckie	4 February 1991 (aged 26)	41	5	(German Football Association) FC Ingolstadt
8	DF	Bailey Wright	28 July 1992 (aged 24)	15	1	(The Football Association) Bristol City
9	FW	Tomi Juric	22 July 1991 (aged 25)	23	6	(Swiss Football Association) Luzern
10	FW	Robbie Kruse	5 October 1988 (aged 28)	52	4	(Chinese Football Association) Liaoning Whowin
11	FW	Jamie Maclaren	29 July 1993 (aged 23)	3	0	(Football Australia) Brisbane Roar
12	GK	Mitchell Langerak	22 August 1988 (aged 28)	8	0	(German Football Association) VfB Stuttgart
13	MF	Aaron Mooy	15 September 1990 (aged 26)	24	5	(The Football Association) Huddersfield Town
14	FW	James Troisi	3 July 1988 (aged 28)	29	4	(Football Australia) Melbourne Victory
15	MF	James Jeggo	12 February 1992 (aged 25)	0	0	(Austrian Football Association) Sturm Graz
16	DF	Aziz Behich	16 December 1990 (aged 26)	13	2	(Turkish Football Federation) Bursaspor
17	MF	Ajdin Hrustic	5 July 1996 (aged 20)	1	0	(Royal Dutch Football Association) Groningen
18	GK	Danny Vukovic	27 March 1985 (aged 32)	0	0	(Football Australia) Sydney FC
19	DF	Ryan McGowan	15 August 1989 (aged 27)	19	0	(Chinese Football Association) Guizhou Hengfeng Zhicheng
20	DF	Trent Sainsbury	5 January 1992 (aged 25)	24	3	(Italian Football Federation) Internazionale
21	MF	Massimo Luongo	25 September 1992 (aged 24)	26	5	(The Football Association) Queens Park Rangers
22	MF	Jackson Irvine	7 March 1993 (aged 24)	11	1	(The Football Association) Burton Albion
23	FW	Tom Rogic	16 December 1992 (aged 24)	25	6	(Scottish Football Association) Celtic

=== Cameroon ===
Manager: (Belgium) Hugo Broos

No.	Pos.	Player	Date of birth (age)	Caps	Goals	Club
1	GK	Fabrice Ondoa	24 December 1995 (aged 21)	32	0	(Royal Spanish Football Federation) Sevilla Atlético
2	DF	Ernest Mabouka	16 June 1988 (aged 29)	6	0	(Slovak Football Association) Žilina
3	MF	André-Frank Zambo Anguissa	16 November 1995 (aged 21)	4	0	(French Football Federation) Marseille
4	DF	Adolphe Teikeu	23 June 1990 (aged 26)	15	0	(French Football Federation) Sochaux
5	DF	Michael Ngadeu-Ngadjui	23 November 1990 (aged 26)	15	2	(Football Association of the Czech Republic) Slavia Prague
6	DF	Ambroise Oyongo	22 June 1991 (aged 25)	32	2	(Canadian Soccer Association) Montreal Impact
7	FW	Moumi Ngamaleu	9 July 1994 (aged 22)	9	2	(Austrian Football Association) Rheindorf Altach
8	FW	Benjamin Moukandjo (captain)	12 November 1988 (aged 28)	52	10	(French Football Federation) Lorient
9	FW	Jacques Zoua	6 September 1991 (aged 25)	23	0	(German Football Association) 1. FC Kaiserslautern
10	FW	Vincent Aboubakar	22 January 1992 (aged 25)	57	17	(Turkish Football Federation) Beşiktaş
11	FW	Olivier Boumal	17 September 1989 (aged 27)	2	0	(Hellenic Football Federation) Panathinaikos
12	DF	Jérôme Guihoata	7 October 1994 (aged 22)	3	0	(Hellenic Football Federation) Panionios
13	FW	Christian Bassogog	18 October 1995 (aged 21)	12	2	(Chinese Football Association) Henan Jianye
14	MF	Georges Mandjeck	9 December 1988 (aged 28)	40	0	(French Football Federation) Metz
15	MF	Sébastien Siani	21 December 1986 (aged 30)	19	2	(Royal Belgian Football Association) Oostende
16	GK	André Onana	2 April 1996 (aged 21)	2	0	(Royal Dutch Football Association) Ajax
17	MF	Arnaud Djoum	2 May 1989 (aged 28)	12	0	(Scottish Football Association) Heart of Midlothian
18	FW	Robert Ndip Tambe	22 February 1994 (aged 23)	10	0	(Slovak Football Association) Spartak Trnava
19	DF	Collins Fai	13 August 1992 (aged 24)	12	0	(Royal Belgian Football Association) Standard Liège
20	FW	Karl Toko Ekambi	14 September 1992 (aged 24)	15	2	(French Football Federation) Angers
21	DF	Lucien Owona	9 August 1990 (aged 26)	1	0	(Royal Spanish Football Federation) Alcorcón
22	DF	Jonathan Ngwem	20 July 1991 (aged 25)	10	0	(Angolan Football Federation) Progresso
23	GK	Georges Bokwé	14 July 1989 (aged 27)	0	0	(Norwegian Football Federation) Mjøndalen

=== Chile ===
Manager: (Spain) Juan Antonio Pizzi

No.	Pos.	Player	Date of birth (age)	Caps	Goals	Club
1	GK	Claudio Bravo (captain)	13 April 1983 (aged 34)	112	0	(The Football Association) Manchester City
2	DF	Eugenio Mena	18 July 1988 (aged 28)	51	3	(Brazilian Football Confederation) Sport Recife
3	DF	Enzo Roco	16 August 1992 (aged 24)	17	1	(Mexican Football Federation) Cruz Azul
4	DF	Mauricio Isla	12 June 1988 (aged 29)	90	4	(Italian Football Federation) Cagliari
5	MF	Francisco Silva	11 February 1986 (aged 31)	33	0	(Mexican Football Federation) Cruz Azul
6	MF	José Pedro Fuenzalida	22 February 1985 (aged 32)	44	3	(Football Federation of Chile) Universidad Católica
7	FW	Alexis Sánchez	19 December 1988 (aged 28)	110	37	(The Football Association) Arsenal
8	MF	Arturo Vidal	22 May 1987 (aged 30)	90	22	(German Football Association) Bayern Munich
9	FW	Ángelo Sagal	18 April 1993 (aged 24)	5	2	(Football Federation of Chile) Huachipato
10	MF	Pablo Hernández	24 October 1986 (aged 30)	14	3	(Royal Spanish Football Federation) Celta Vigo
11	FW	Eduardo Vargas	20 November 1989 (aged 27)	72	33	(Mexican Football Federation) UANL
12	GK	Cristopher Toselli	15 June 1988 (aged 29)	9	0	(Football Federation of Chile) Universidad Católica
13	DF	Paulo Díaz	25 August 1994 (aged 22)	6	0	(Argentine Football Association) San Lorenzo
14	MF	Felipe Gutiérrez	8 October 1990 (aged 26)	34	4	(Brazilian Football Confederation) Internacional
15	DF	Jean Beausejour	1 June 1984 (aged 33)	91	6	(Football Federation of Chile) Universidad de Chile
16	FW	Martín Rodríguez	5 August 1994 (aged 22)	4	0	(Mexican Football Federation) Cruz Azul
17	DF	Gary Medel	3 August 1987 (aged 29)	101	7	(Italian Football Federation) Internazionale
18	DF	Gonzalo Jara	29 August 1985 (aged 31)	102	3	(Football Federation of Chile) Universidad de Chile
19	FW	Leonardo Valencia	25 April 1991 (aged 26)	6	1	(Football Federation of Chile) Palestino
20	MF	Charles Aránguiz	17 April 1989 (aged 28)	58	7	(German Football Association) Bayer Leverkusen
21	MF	Marcelo Díaz	30 December 1986 (aged 30)	54	1	(Royal Spanish Football Federation) Celta Vigo
22	FW	Edson Puch	9 April 1986 (aged 31)	17	2	(Mexican Football Federation) Necaxa
23	GK	Johnny Herrera	9 May 1981 (aged 36)	19	0	(Football Federation of Chile) Universidad de Chile

=== Germany ===
Manager: Joachim Löw

Leroy Sané and Diego Demme withdrew from the squad due to injury and were not replaced, thus reducing the squad to 21 players.

No.	Pos.	Player	Date of birth (age)	Caps	Goals	Club
1	GK	Kevin Trapp	8 July 1990 (aged 26)	1	0	(French Football Federation) Paris Saint-Germain
2	DF	Shkodran Mustafi	17 April 1992 (aged 25)	16	2	(The Football Association) Arsenal
3	DF	Jonas Hector	27 May 1990 (aged 27)	29	3	(German Football Association) 1. FC Köln
4	DF	Matthias Ginter	19 January 1994 (aged 23)	10	0	(German Football Association) Borussia Dortmund
5	DF	Marvin Plattenhardt	26 January 1992 (aged 25)	2	0	(German Football Association) Hertha BSC
6	DF	Benjamin Henrichs	23 February 1997 (aged 20)	1	0	(German Football Association) Bayer Leverkusen
7	MF	Julian Draxler (captain)	20 September 1993 (aged 23)	30	4	(French Football Federation) Paris Saint-Germain
8	MF	Leon Goretzka	6 February 1995 (aged 22)	5	0	(German Football Association) Schalke 04
9	FW	Sandro Wagner	29 November 1987 (aged 29)	2	3	(German Football Association) 1899 Hoffenheim
10	MF	Kerem Demirbay	3 July 1993 (aged 23)	1	0	(German Football Association) 1899 Hoffenheim
11	FW	Timo Werner	6 March 1996 (aged 21)	2	0	(German Football Association) RB Leipzig
12	GK	Bernd Leno	4 March 1992 (aged 25)	4	0	(German Football Association) Bayer Leverkusen
13	MF	Lars Stindl	26 August 1988 (aged 28)	2	0	(German Football Association) Borussia Mönchengladbach
14	MF	Emre Can	12 January 1994 (aged 23)	10	0	(The Football Association) Liverpool
15	MF	Amin Younes	6 August 1993 (aged 23)	2	1	(Royal Dutch Football Association) Ajax
16	DF	Antonio Rüdiger	3 March 1993 (aged 24)	13	0	(Italian Football Federation) Roma
17	DF	Niklas Süle	3 September 1995 (aged 21)	2	0	(German Football Association) 1899 Hoffenheim
18	DF	Joshua Kimmich	8 February 1995 (aged 22)	15	2	(German Football Association) Bayern Munich
20	MF	Julian Brandt	2 May 1996 (aged 21)	7	1	(German Football Association) Bayer Leverkusen
21	MF	Sebastian Rudy	28 February 1990 (aged 27)	15	0	(German Football Association) 1899 Hoffenheim
22	GK	Marc-André ter Stegen	30 April 1992 (aged 25)	10	0	(Royal Spanish Football Federation) Barcelona

== Player representation ==
=== By age ===
==== Players ====
- Oldest: (Mexico) Rafael Márquez (38 years, 124 days)
- Youngest: (New Zealand) Dane Ingham (17 years, 315 days)

==== Goalkeepers ====
- Oldest: (Chile) Jhonny Herrera (36 years, 39 days)
- Youngest: (Cameroon) André Onana (21 years, 76 days)

==== Captains ====
- Oldest: (Mexico) Rafael Márquez (38 years, 124 days)
- Youngest: (Germany) Julian Draxler (23 years, 300 days)

=== By club ===
Players	Club
5	(Germany) Bayer Leverkusen, (Portugal) Sporting CP, (Russia) Spartak Moscow, (Portugal) Porto
4	(Germany) 1899 Hoffenheim, (New Zealand) Wellington Phoenix, (Portugal) Benfica, (Russia) Rostov
3	7 clubs
2	21 clubs
1	82 clubs

=== By clubs nationality ===
Players	Countries
25	Germany
24	Russia
15	England, Mexico
14	Portugal, Spain
11	Australia
9	France
7	Chile, Netherlands
5	Italy
4	United States
3	Greece, Turkey
2	Austria, Belgium, Brazil, Canada, China, Norway, Scotland, Slovakia
1	Angola, Argentina, Czech Republic, Indonesia, Japan, New Zealand, South Africa, Switzerland, United Arab Emirates

Nations in italics are not represented by their national teams in the finals.

=== By representatives of domestic league ===
National squad	No.
Australia	5
Cameroon	0
Chile	7
Germany	14
Mexico	10
New Zealand	1
Portugal	11
Russia	23
