= 2015 Africa Cup of Nations Group D =

Football tournament group stage

Group D of the 2015 Africa Cup of Nations was played from 20 January until 28 January in Equatorial Guinea. The group consisted of Ivory Coast, Mali, Cameroon, and Guinea. Ivory Coast and Guinea advanced as group winners and runners-up respectively, while Mali and Cameroon were eliminated.

== Teams ==
| Draw position | Team | Method of qualification | Date of qualification | Finals appearance | Last appearance | Previous best performance | CAF Rankings Points (Note: The CAF rankings were used for seeding for the final draw.) | FIFA Rankings Start of event |
|---|---|---|---|---|---|---|---|---|
| D1 | Ivory Coast | Group D runners-up | 19 November 2014 | 21st | 2013 | Winners (1992) | 44 | 28 |
| D2 | Mali | Group B runners-up | 19 November 2014 | 9th | 2013 | Runners-up (1972) | 38 | 49 |
| D3 | Cameroon | Group D winners | 15 November 2014 | 17th | 2010 | Winners (1984, 1988, 2000, 2002) | 23.5 | 42 |
| D4 | Guinea | Group E runners-up | 19 November 2014 | 11th | 2012 | Runners-up (1976) | 19 | 39 |

== Standings ==
| Pos | Team | Pld | W | D | L | GF | GA | GD | Pts | Qualification |
|---|---|---|---|---|---|---|---|---|---|---|
| 1 | Ivory Coast | 3 | 1 | 2 | 0 | 3 | 2 | +1 | 5 | Advance to knockout stage |
| 2 | Guinea | 3 | 0 | 3 | 0 | 3 | 3 | 0 | 3 (Note: Guinea and Mali were tied on head-to-head record, overall goal difference, and overall goals scored. A drawing of lots took place on 29 January 2015, 16:00 local time at the Hilton Malabo. Guinea selected the lot for 2nd place and advanced to the quarter-finals as the group runner-up.) | Advance to knockout stage |
| 3 | Mali | 3 | 0 | 3 | 0 | 3 | 3 | 0 | 3 | |
| 4 | Cameroon | 3 | 0 | 2 | 1 | 2 | 3 | −1 | 2 | |

Source: CAF
Rules for classification: Tiebreakers
Notes:

In the quarter-finals:

- Ivory Coast advanced to play Algeria (runner-up of Group C).
- Guinea advanced to play Ghana (winner of Group C).

== Matches ==
All times local, WAT (UTC+1).

=== Ivory Coast vs Guinea ===
Guinea took the lead in the 36th minute when Mohamed Yattara smashed home a headed clearance from the Ivory Coast defence. Gervinho was sent off in the 58th minute for hitting Naby Keïta in the face, but the 10-men Ivory Coast equalized in the 72nd minute, as Wilfried Bony controlled the ball on his chest and passed to Seydou Doumbia to score.

20 January 2015
17:00

| Ivory Coast | 1–1 | Guinea |
|---|---|---|
| Doumbia 72' | Report | M. Yattara 36' |

Estadio de Malabo, Malabo
Attendance: 14,875
Referee: Mehdi Abid Charef (Algeria)

| Ivory Coast | Guinea |

| GK | 16 | Sylvain Gbohouo |
| RB | 17 | Serge Aurier | (yellow card) 40' |
| CB | 21 | Eric Bailly |
| CB | 4 | Kolo Touré |
| LB | 22 | Wilfried Kanon |
| CM | 19 | Yaya Touré (c) | | (substituted off) 86' |
| CM | 9 | Cheick Tioté | (yellow card) 62' |
| RW | 10 | Gervinho | (red card) 58' |
| AM | 8 | Salomon Kalou | | (substituted off) 65' |
| LW | 20 | Serey Dié | (yellow card) 54' | (substituted off) 65' |
| CF | 12 | Wilfried Bony |
Substitutions:
| DF | 5 | Siaka Tiéné | | (substituted on) 65' |
| FW | 7 | Seydou Doumbia | | (substituted on) 65' |
| MF | 6 | Cheick Doukouré | | (substituted on) 86' |
Manager:
(France) Hervé Renard

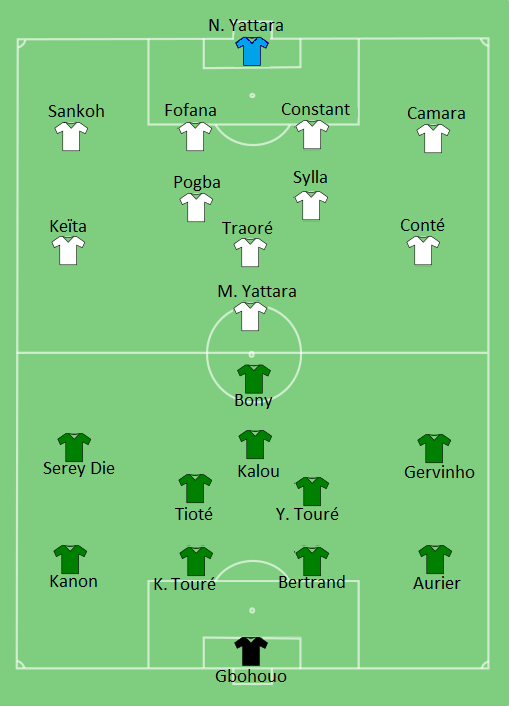

| GK | 1 | Naby Yattara |
| RB | 20 | Baissama Sankoh |
| CB | 17 | Boubacar Fofana |
| CB | 10 | Kévin Constant |
| LB | 5 | Fodé Camara |
| CM | 4 | Florentin Pogba |
| CM | 3 | Issiaga Sylla |
| RW | 15 | Naby Keïta |
| AM | 8 | Ibrahima Traoré (c) |
| LW | 12 | Ibrahima Conté |
| CF | 2 | Mohamed Yattara | (substituted off) 71' |
Substitutions:
| FW | 7 | Abdoul Camara | (substituted on) 71' |
Manager:
(France) Michel Dussuyer

Man of the Match:
Ibrahima Traoré (Guinea)

Assistant referees:
Abdelhak Etchiali (Algeria)
Yahaya Mahamadou (Niger)
Fourth official:
Joaquin Esono Eyang (Equatorial Guinea)

=== Mali vs Cameroon ===
Mali took the lead in the 71st minute as Molla Wagué's flick-on from a free kick allowed Sambou Yatabaré to score at the far post. Cameroon equalized in the 84th minute, after Ambroise Oyongo controlled Raoul Loé's lofted pass to score from close range.

20 January 2015
20:00

| Mali | 1–1 | Cameroon |
|---|---|---|
| S. Yatabaré 71' | Report | Oyongo 84' |

Estadio de Malabo, Malabo
Attendance: 15,000
Referee: Janny Sikazwe (Zambia)

| Mali | Cameroon |

| GK | 16 | Soumbeïla Diakité |
| RB | 15 | Drissa Diakité |
| CB | 23 | Molla Wagué |
| CB | 4 | Salif Coulibaly |
| LB | 3 | Adama Tamboura |
| DM | 8 | Yacouba Sylla |
| RM | 14 | Sambou Yatabaré | | (substituted off) 90+4' |
| CM | 17 | Mamoutou N'Diaye | (yellow card) 24' | (substituted off) 80' |
| CM | 12 | Seydou Keita (c) |
| LM | 10 | Bakary Sako |
| CF | 7 | Mustapha Yatabaré | | (substituted off) 86' |
Substitutions:
| MF | 6 | Tongo Doumbia | | (substituted on) 80' |
| FW | 20 | Modibo Maïga | | (substituted on) 86' |
| MF | 21 | Abdou Traoré | | (substituted on) 90+4' |
Manager:
(Poland) Henryk Kasperczak

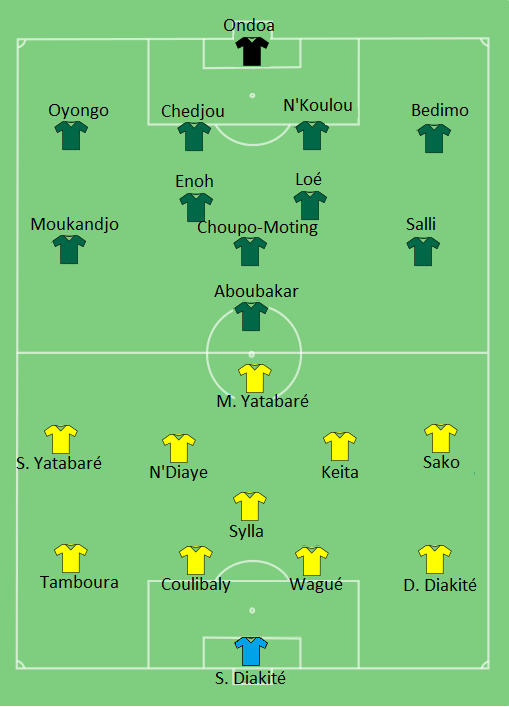

| GK | 16 | Fabrice Ondoa |
| RB | 6 | Ambroise Oyongo |
| CB | 21 | Aurélien Chedjou |
| CB | 3 | Nicolas N'Koulou |
| LB | 12 | Henri Bedimo |
| CM | 18 | Eyong Enoh | (substituted off) 17' |
| CM | 4 | Raoul Loé |
| RW | 8 | Benjamin Moukandjo |
| AM | 13 | Eric Maxim Choupo-Moting (c) |
| LW | 11 | Edgar Salli |
| CF | 10 | Vincent Aboubakar |
Substitutions:
| MF | 20 | Franck Kom | (substituted on) 17' (substituted off) 78' |
| FW | 15 | Franck Etoundi | (substituted on) 78' |
Manager:
(Germany) Volker Finke

Man of the Match:
Sambou Yatabaré (Mali)

Assistant referees:
Jerson dos Santos (Angola)
Oamogetse Godisamang (Botswana)
Fourth official:
Joseph Odartei Lamptey (Ghana)

=== Ivory Coast vs Mali ===
Mali took the lead in the 7th minute, as Bakary Sako scored home from Sambou Yatabaré's cross. Ivory Coast equalized in the 86th minute, when Serge Aurier passed to Max Gradel to score.

24 January 2015
17:00

| Ivory Coast | 1–1 | Mali |
|---|---|---|
| Gradel 86' | Report | Sako 7' |

Estadio de Malabo, Malabo
Attendance: 14,890
Referee: Bouchaïb El Ahrach (Morocco)

| Ivory Coast | Mali |

| GK | 16 | Sylvain Gbohouo |
| RB | 17 | Serge Aurier |
| CB | 22 | Wilfried Kanon | | (substituted off) 83' |
| CB | 4 | Kolo Touré |
| LB | 5 | Siaka Tiéné |
| CM | 14 | Ismaël Diomandé | | (substituted off) 39' |
| CM | 9 | Cheick Tioté | (yellow card) 82' |
| RW | 19 | Yaya Touré (c) |
| LW | 21 | Eric Bailly |
| CF | 12 | Wilfried Bony | | (substituted off) 84' |
| CF | 7 | Seydou Doumbia |
Substitutions:
| MF | 15 | Max Gradel | | (substituted on) 39' |
| FW | 8 | Salomon Kalou | | (substituted on) 83' |
| FW | 11 | Tallo Gadji | | (substituted on) 84' |
Manager:
(France) Hervé Renard

| GK | 16 | Soumbeïla Diakité | | (substituted off) 72' |
| RB | 15 | Drissa Diakité |
| CB | 23 | Molla Wagué |
| CB | 4 | Salif Coulibaly |
| LB | 3 | Adama Tamboura |
| DM | 17 | Mamoutou N'Diaye |
| CM | 12 | Seydou Keita (c) | (yellow card) 77' |
| CM | 8 | Yacouba Sylla | (yellow card) 59' |
| RW | 10 | Bakary Sako | | (substituted off) 78' |
| LW | 14 | Sambou Yatabaré | (yellow card) 88' |
| CF | 7 | Mustapha Yatabaré | | (substituted off) 90+1' |
Substitutions:
| GK | 1 | Germain Berthé | | (substituted on) 72' |
| MF | 6 | Tongo Doumbia | | (substituted on) 78' |
| FW | 20 | Modibo Maïga | | (substituted on) 90+1' |
Manager:
(Poland) Henryk Kasperczak

Man of the Match:
Seydou Keita (Mali)

Assistant referees:
Redouane Achik (Morocco)
Malik Alidu Salifu (Ghana)
Fourth official:
Juste Ephrem Zio (Burkina Faso)

=== Cameroon vs Guinea ===
Cameroon took the lead in the 13th minute, when Benjamin Moukandjo's corner evaded everybody and hit the goalkeeper to go into the net. Guinea equalized in the 42nd minute, as Ibrahima Traoré received a pass from Issiaga Sylla, and shot home from outside the penalty area.

24 January 2015
20:00

| Cameroon | 1–1 | Guinea |
|---|---|---|
| Moukandjo 13' | Report | Traoré 42' |

Estadio de Malabo, Malabo
Attendance: 15,000
Referee: Tessema Bamlak (Ethiopia)

| Cameroon | Guinea |

| GK | 16 | Fabrice Ondoa |
| RB | 6 | Ambroise Oyongo | (substituted off) 62' |
| CB | 21 | Aurélien Chedjou |
| CB | 3 | Nicolas N'Koulou |
| LB | 12 | Henri Bedimo |
| RM | 8 | Benjamin Moukandjo |
| CM | 17 | Stéphane Mbia (c) |
| CM | 4 | Raoul Loé | (substituted off) 81' |
| LM | 11 | Edgar Salli |
| CF | 13 | Eric Maxim Choupo-Moting |
| CF | 10 | Vincent Aboubakar | (substituted off) 77' |
Substitutions:
| DF | 5 | Jérôme Guihoata | (substituted on) 62' |
| FW | 15 | Franck Etoundi | (substituted on) 77' |
| MF | 20 | Franck Kom | (substituted on) 81' |
Manager:
(Germany) Volker Finke

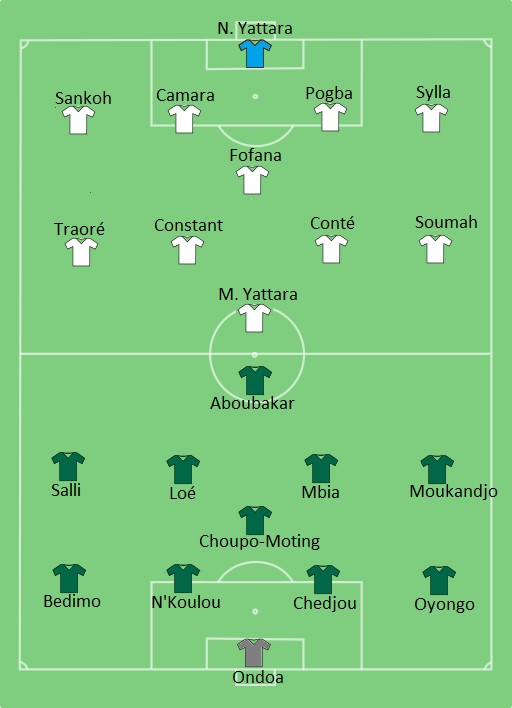

| GK | 1 | Naby Yattara |
| RB | 20 | Baissama Sankoh |
| CB | 5 | Fodé Camara |
| CB | 4 | Florentin Pogba | | (substituted off) 45+3' |
| LB | 3 | Issiaga Sylla |
| DM | 17 | Boubacar Fofana | (yellow card) 32' |
| RM | 8 | Ibrahima Traoré (c) | | (substituted off) 90+3' |
| CM | 10 | Kévin Constant |
| CM | 12 | Ibrahima Conté |
| LM | 18 | Seydouba Soumah | | (substituted off) 66' |
| CF | 2 | Mohamed Yattara |
Substitutions:
| DF | 13 | Abdoulaye Cissé | | (substituted on) 45+3' |
| MF | 15 | Naby Keïta | | (substituted on) 66' |
| FW | 19 | François Kamano | | (substituted on) 90+3' |
Manager:
(France) Michel Dussuyer

Man of the Match:
Ibrahima Traoré (Guinea)

Assistant referees:
Abdelhak Etchiali (Algeria)
Anouar Hmila (Tunisia)
Fourth official:
Eric Otogo-Castane (Gabon)

=== Cameroon vs Ivory Coast ===
The only goal of the match was scored by Max Gradel in the 35th minute, as he stole the ball from the Cameroon defence, dribbled inside and shot home from outside the penalty area. The win sent Ivory Coast to the quarter-finals as group winners, while Cameroon were eliminated.

28 January 2015
19:00

| Cameroon | 0–1 | Ivory Coast |
|---|---|---|
| | Report | Gradel 35' |

Estadio de Malabo, Malabo
Attendance: 15,230
Referee: Eric Otogo-Castane (Gabon)

| Cameroon | Ivory Coast |

| GK | 16 | Fabrice Ondoa |
| RB | 5 | Jérôme Guihoata |
| CB | 21 | Aurélien Chedjou |
| CB | 3 | Nicolas N'Koulou |
| LB | 12 | Henri Bedimo |
| CM | 14 | Georges Mandjeck |
| CM | 8 | Benjamin Moukandjo | (substituted off) 67' |
| RW | 13 | Eric Maxim Choupo-Moting |
| AM | 17 | Stéphane Mbia (c) |
| LW | 15 | Franck Etoundi | (substituted off) 55' |
| CF | 11 | Edgar Salli | (substituted off) 46' |
Substitutions:
| FW | 10 | Vincent Aboubakar | (substituted on) 46' |
| FW | 2 | Léonard Kweuke | (substituted on) 55' |
| MF | 7 | Clinton N'Jie | (substituted on) 67' |
Manager:
(Germany) Volker Finke

| GK | 16 | Sylvain Gbohouo | (yellow card) 90+3' |
| RB | 17 | Serge Aurier |
| CB | 21 | Eric Bailly | (yellow card) 27' | (substituted off) 28' |
| CB | 4 | Kolo Touré |
| LB | 22 | Wilfried Kanon |
| CM | 20 | Serey Dié |
| CM | 19 | Yaya Touré (c) | (yellow card) 32' | (substituted off) 82' |
| RW | 15 | Max Gradel |
| AM | 7 | Seydou Doumbia | | (substituted off) 60' |
| LW | 5 | Siaka Tiéné |
| CF | 12 | Wilfried Bony |
Substitutions:
| DF | 2 | Ousmane Viera | | (substituted on) 28' |
| FW | 11 | Tallo Gadji | | (substituted on) 60' |
| MF | 6 | Cheick Doukouré | | (substituted on) 82' |
Manager:
(France) Hervé Renard

Man of the Match:
Max Gradel (Ivory Coast)

Assistant referees:
Abdelhak Etchiali (Algeria)
Jean-Claude Birumushahu (Burundi)
Fourth official:
Malang Diedhiou (Senegal)

=== Guinea vs Mali ===
Guinea took the lead in the 15th minute with a penalty by Kévin Constant, which was awarded due to a handball by Salif Coulibaly. Mali then were awarded their own penalty three minutes later after Baissama Sankoh was penalised for handball, but Seydou Keita's penalty was easily saved. Mali equalized in the 47th minute, when Abdoulay Diaby crossed for Modibo Maïga to head home. The match finished in a 1–1 draw, the same scoreline as both Guinea and Mali's previous two matches, meaning that the two teams were tied on head-to-head record, overall goal difference, and overall goals scored. A drawing of lots were held the next day to decide which team qualify for the quarter-finals as group runner-up, which was won by Guinea (see below for details).

28 January 2015
19:00

| Guinea | 1–1 | Mali |
|---|---|---|
| Constant 15' (pen.) | Report | Maïga 47' |

Estadio de Mongomo, Mongomo
Attendance: 13,470
Referee: Mohamed Said Kordi (Tunisia)

| Guinea | Mali |

| GK | 1 | Naby Yattara |
| RB | 13 | Abdoulaye Cissé |
| CB | 20 | Baissama Sankoh |
| CB | 5 | Fodé Camara |
| LB | 3 | Issiaga Sylla | (yellow card) 55' | (substituted off) 57' |
| DM | 15 | Naby Keïta |
| CM | 17 | Boubacar Fofana |
| CM | 10 | Kévin Constant | | (substituted off) 84' |
| RW | 8 | Ibrahima Traoré (c) | | (substituted off) 62' |
| LW | 12 | Ibrahima Conté |
| CF | 2 | Mohamed Yattara |
Substitutions:
| DF | 23 | Djibril Tamsir Paye | | (substituted on) 57' |
| FW | 18 | Seydouba Soumah | | (substituted on) 62' |
| FW | 7 | Abdoul Camara | | (substituted on) 84' |
Manager:
(France) Michel Dussuyer

| GK | 1 | Germain Berthé |
| RB | 15 | Drissa Diakité |
| CB | 23 | Molla Wagué |
| CB | 4 | Salif Coulibaly |
| LB | 3 | Adama Tamboura |
| DM | 17 | Mamoutou N'Diaye | | (substituted off) 90+1' |
| CM | 8 | Yacouba Sylla |
| CM | 12 | Seydou Keita (c) |
| RW | 18 | Abdoulay Diaby | (yellow card) 70' | (substituted off) 72' |
| LW | 20 | Modibo Maïga |
| CF | 7 | Mustapha Yatabaré | | (substituted off) 84' |
Substitutions:
| MF | 10 | Bakary Sako | | (substituted on) 72' |
| MF | 14 | Sambou Yatabaré | | (substituted on) 84' |
| MF | 21 | Abdou Traoré | | (substituted on) 90+1' |
Manager:
(Poland) Henryk Kasperczak

Man of the Match:
Modibo Maïga (Mali)

Assistant referees:
Anouar Hmila (Tunisia)
Malik Alidu Salifu (Ghana)
Fourth official:
Mehd Abid Charef (Algeria)

== Drawing of lots ==
Guinea and Mali finished level on the second spot after the group stage, making the first drawing of lots needed at the tournament since 1988. Unlike some other international tournaments, 2015 Africa Cup of Nations tournament regulations would not use fair-play criteria or a penalty shoot-out after the teams met on the last match day to determine the final group ranking. Both head coaches have openly criticised the regulations.

The draw took place at 16:00 WAT (UTC+1) on 29 January 2015, at the Hilton Malabo. Representatives of each team drew a ball, one of which was numbered '2' and the other numbered '3'. Guinea drew the ball '2' and were placed as runners-up in the group, with Mali being third. As such, Guinea advanced to the quarter-finals and Mali were eliminated.
