= Fodé Camara =

Fodé Camara may refer to:

- Fodé Bouya Camara (born 1946), Guinean football midfielder
- Fodé Camara (footballer, born 1973), Guinean football forward
- Fodé Camara (footballer, born 1988), Guinean football defender
- Fodé Camara (footballer, born 1998), Guinean football defender
- Fodé Camara (footballer, born 2002), Guinean football defender on the 2021 Africa Cup of Nations squad
