= Yatabaré =

Yatabaré is a surname. Notable people with the surname include:

- Mustapha Yatabaré (born 1986), Malian footballer
- Sambou Yatabaré (born 1989), Malian footballer, brother of Mustapha
