= Fabrice Ondoa =

Cameroonian footballer (born 1995)

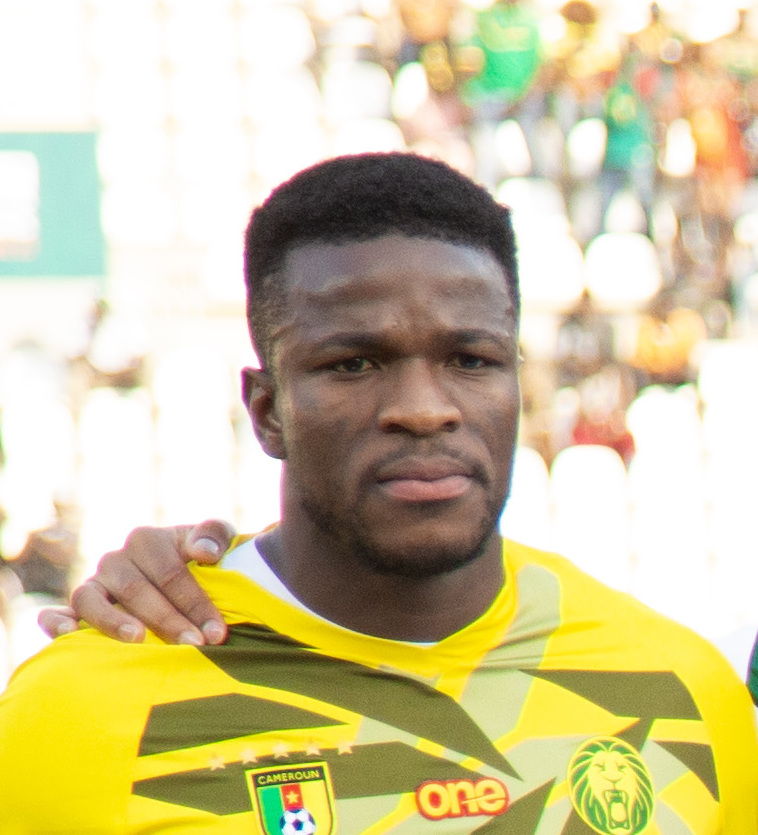
- Ondoa with Cameroon at the 2023 Africa Cup of Nations

Personal information
- Full name: Joseph Fabrice Ondoa Ebogo
- Date of birth: 24 December 1995 (age 30)
- Place of birth: Yaoundé, Cameroon
- Height: 1.85 m (6 ft 1 in)
- Position: Goalkeeper

Team information
- Current team: Rabotnički

Youth career
- 2006–2009: Samuel Eto'o Academy
- 2009–2014: Barcelona

Senior career*
Years	Team	Apps	(Gls)
2014–2016	Barcelona B	0	(0)
2016	Pobla Mafumet	5	(0)
2016–2017	Gimnàstic	0	(0)
2016–2017	→ Sevilla B (loan)	2	(0)
2017–2018	Sevilla B	3	(0)
2018–2020	Oostende	28	(0)
2021	Istra 1961	0	(0)
2022–2023	Auda	42	(0)
2023–2024	Nîmes	3	(0)
2024–2025	RFS	20	(0)
2026	Rabotnički	16	(0)

International career^{‡}
2014–	Cameroon	51	(0)
Medal record
Men's football
Representing Cameroon
Africa Cup of Nations
Winner	2017 Gabon
- * Club domestic league appearances and goals as of 13 July 2026 ‡ National team caps and goals as of 23 January 2024

Joseph Fabrice Ondoa Ebogo (born 24 December 1995) is a Cameroonian professional footballer who last played as a goalkeeper for Macedonian First League club Rabotnički and plays for the Cameroon national team.

Having made his debut in 2014 at the age of 18, he represented Cameroon at two Africa Cup of Nations tournaments, winning the 2017 edition.

== Club career ==
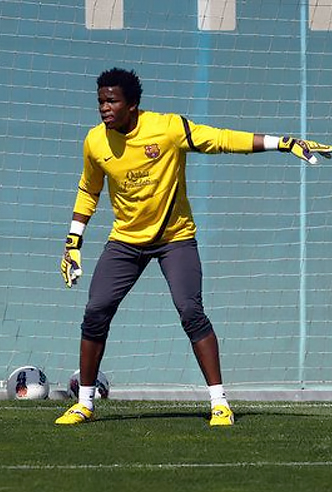
Ondoa with Barcelona academy in 2011

Born in Yaoundé, Ondoa joined Barcelona in 2009, aged 13, after starting it out at Samuel Eto'o Foundation. He progressed through the club's youth system, and renewed his link with the Catalans until 2017 in 2014.

In June 2014, Ondoa was promoted to the reserves in Segunda División. However, he was only used as a backup to Adrián Ortolá during the campaign.

On 7 January 2016, Ondoa signed a three-and-a-half-year contract with Gimnàstic also in the second level, after rescinding his link with Barça. He was assigned to their farm team, Pobla de Mafumet of the third division, and made his senior club debut three days later in a 3–2 loss at Reus Deportiu.

On 17 August 2016, Ondoa was loaned to fellow second-tier club Sevilla B, for one year. Second choice to Churripi, he made his professional club debut on 18 March 2017 in a 2–1 win at Real Zaragoza, in which he was punished for timewasting by conceding a free kick in the penalty area from which Edu García scored; with two minutes remaining he was sent off for a foul with all substitutions having been made, and debutant defender José María Amo had to replace him in goal.

On 11 May 2017, Ondoa signed for the Andalusians until 2020, as the club exercised his buyout clause. After suffering relegation, he signed a four-year deal with Belgian side Oostende. In December 2020, he was terminated by the Belgian side after violating COVID-19 lockdown orders.

On 12 February 2021, he joined Croatian club Istra 1961, signing a contract until the end of the season. In March 2022, he joined FK Auda in the Latvian First Division. On 4 July 2023, he left the club. On 1 September 2023 he joined French Third Division club Nîmes Olympique. On 28 June 2024, he signed with Latvian club FK RFS. On 2 February 2026, he signed a short-term contract with Macedonian club FK Rabotnički.After the club was relegated, it was announced that Ondoa's contract would not be renewed.

== International career ==
On 24 August 2014, Ondoa was called up to Cameroon for the matches against DR Congo and the Ivory Coast. Thirteen days later he made his international debut, starting in a 2–0 win against the former, and being later praised by manager Volker Finke.

Ondoa and Barcelona teammate Macky Bagnack were included in the 23-man squad for the 2015 Africa Cup of Nations. He played all three of their matches at the tournament in Equatorial Guinea, as they came last in their group.

At the 2017 Africa Cup of Nations in Gabon, Ondoa was again the undisputed goalkeeper for the Indomitable Lions. He was man of the match in their quarter-final win over Senegal, in which he saved the decisive attempt from Sadio Mané in the penalty shootout. Cameroon won the title with a 2–1 victory over Egypt in the final, and he was elected into the Team of the Tournament.

== Personal life ==
His cousin, André Onana, also a goalkeeper.

== Career statistics ==
=== Club ===
As of 13 July 2026

Appearances and goals by club, season and competition
Club	Season	League			Cup		Europe (Note: Includes appearances in UEFA Champions League and UEFA Europa League.)		Other		Total	
Club	Season	Division	Apps	Goals	Apps	Goals	Apps	Goals	Apps	Goals	Apps	Goals
Barcelona B	2014–15	Segunda División	0	0	—		—		—		0	0
Barcelona B	2015–16	Segunda División B	0	0	—		—		—		0	0
Barcelona B	Total		0	0	0	0	0	0	0	0	0	0
Pobla Mafumet	2015–16	Segunda División B	5	0	—		—		—		5	0
Sevilla B	2016–17	Segunda División	2	0	—		—		—		2	0
Sevilla B	2017–18	Segunda División	3	0	—		—		—		3	0
Sevilla B	Total		5	0	0	0	0	0	0	0	5	0
Oostende	2018–19	Pro League	23	0	—		—		—		23	0
Oostende	2019–20	Pro League	5	0	2	0	—		—		7	0
Istra 1961	2020–21	Croatian Football League	0	0	1	0	—		—		1	0
Auda	2022	Latvian Virsliga	30	0	4	0	—		—		34	0
Auda	2023	Latvian Virsliga	12	0	0	0	—		—		12	0
Auda	Total		42	0	4	0	0	0	0	0	46	0
Nîmes	2023–24	Championnat National 1	3	0	0	0	—		—		3	0
RFS	2024	Latvian Virsliga	12	0	1	0	—		—		13	0
RFS	2025	Latvian Virsliga	8	0	0	0	16	0	1 (Note: Appearance in Latvian Supercup)	0	25	0
RFS	Total		20	0	1	0	16	0	1	0	38	0
Rabotnički	2025–26	Macedonian Prva Liga	16	0	0	0	—		—		16	0
Career total			119	0	8	0	16	0	1	0	144	0

=== International ===
As of 15 January 2024

Appearances and goals by national team and year
National team	Year	Apps	Goals
Cameroon	2014	6	0
Cameroon	2015	9	0
Cameroon	2016	6	0
Cameroon	2017	16	0
Cameroon	2018	1	0
Cameroon	2019	1	0
Cameroon	2020	1	0
Cameroon	2021	1	0
Cameroon	2022	0	0
Cameroon	2023	4	0
Cameroon	2024	2	0
Total		50	0

== Honours ==
Barcelona

- UEFA Youth League: 2013–14

Auda

- Latvian Football Cup: 2022

Cameroon

- Africa Cup of Nations: 2017

Individual

- CAF Team of the Tournament: 2017
