= 2015 Africa Cup of Nations =

30th edition of the Africa Cup of Nations

Copa Africana de Naciones 2015 Coupe d'Afrique des Nations 2015 Campeonato Africano das Nações de 2015 AFCON 2015 CAN 2015

Tournament details
- Host country: Equatorial Guinea
- Dates: 17 January – 8 February
- Teams: 16
- Venues: 4 (in 4 host cities)

Final positions
- Champions: Ivory Coast (2nd title)
- Runners-up: Ghana
- Third place: DR Congo
- Fourth place: Equatorial Guinea

Tournament statistics
- Matches played: 32
- Goals scored: 68 (2.13 per match)
- Attendance: 617,374 (19,293 per match)
- Top scorer(s): (Tunisia) Ahmed Akaïchi (Ghana) André Ayew (Equatorial Guinea) Javier Balboa (Republic of the Congo) Thievy Bifouma (Democratic Republic of the Congo) Dieumerci Mbokani (3 goals each)
- Best player: (Ghana) Christian Atsu
- Best goalkeeper: (Ivory Coast) Sylvain Gbohouo
- Fair play award: DR Congo

The 2015 Africa Cup of Nations, known as the Orange Africa Cup of Nations, Equatorial Guinea 2015 for sponsorship reasons, was the 30th staging of the Africa Cup of Nations, the international men's football championship of Africa. It was organized by the Confederation of African Football (CAF) and was held from 17 January to 8 February.

The tournament was initially scheduled to be hosted by Morocco who later demanded postponement of the event because of the Ebola virus epidemic in West Africa; subsequently Morocco was ruled out as a host country and replaced by Equatorial Guinea.

Ivory Coast won the tournament for their second Africa Cup of Nations title, defeating Ghana 9–8 in a penalty shoot-out after the final finished goalless following extra time. The DR Congo came third and the hosts Equatorial Guinea fourth, while defending champions Nigeria had failed to qualify for the tournament.

== Host selection ==
Bids :

- Botswana (withdrew)
- Cameroon (withdrew)
- DR Congo (withdrew)
- Guinea (withdrew)
- Morocco (selected as hosts for 2015)
- South Africa (selected as hosts for 2017)
- Zambia (withdrew)
- Zimbabwe (withdrew)

CAF received 3 bids before 30 September 2010, the deadline, to host either the 2015 or 2017 Africa Cup of Nations from DR Congo, Morocco and South Africa. All three bids were originally put on a shortlist. CAF then began an inspection procedure, on November and December 2010, intending to visit each bidding country to view stadiums, infrastructure, and football interest. They inspected the DR Congo first. Shortly after the inspection, DR Congo informed CAF that they would be withdrawing their bids for both the 2015 and 2017 Africa Cup of Nations tournaments. Morocco was the next country to be inspected, with CAF visiting the country in early November 2010. South Africa was inspected in December 2010.

On 29 January, during the 2011 CAF Super Cup, the CAF Board decided that Morocco would host the 2015 African Cup of Nations, while the 2017 edition would be held in South Africa. The four Morocco host cities which were scheduled to host the tournament were Rabat, Marrakesh, Agadir and Tangier, as announced by the CAF Executive Committee on 23 September 2013. Casablanca would serve as an alternative venue.

=== Moroccan withdrawal ===
In October 2014, the government of Morocco requested a postponement of the tournament due to the Ebola virus epidemic in West Africa. After the matter was discussed at the executive committee meeting on 2 November 2014, CAF decided to keep the date of the tournament, while also asking for a clarification from the Royal Moroccan Football Federation of whether they still wish to host the tournament. On 8 November, Morocco failed to meet this deadline to confirm it would host the tournament. Three days later CAF confirmed that Morocco would not host the tournament and a new host would be chosen from a list of countries which have expressed interest. Morocco, who had previously qualified as hosts, were disqualified from participation at the tournament. CAF confirmed legal action against Morocco due to a contract signed in April 2014. Moroccan Sports Minister Mohamed Ouzzine said that CAF had falsely accused his country of "refusing" to host the tournament when it wanted it postponed, and justified the decision by citing that the World Health Organization gives every country the right to protect its citizens. On 6 February 2015, CAF announced that Morocco had been banned from the next two AFCON tournaments, fined 1 million US dollars, as well as demanding 9 million US dollars in compensation. However, the ban was overturned by the Court of Arbitration for Sport, meaning Morocco could (and later did) enter the tournaments.

Egypt, Ghana, South Africa and Sudan all declined to take over as hosts. Angola, the hosts of the 2010 edition, were spoken of as a potential replacement due to existing stadia and infrastructure in the country. However, a member of the Angolan Football Federation stated that it could not be possible as the new government budget did not include any tournaments.

On 14 November 2014, CAF announced that Equatorial Guinea would host the tournament.

== Qualification ==
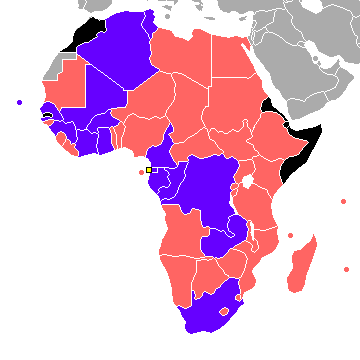
Qualified Failed to qualify Withdrew, disqualified or did not enter Not part of CAF

Qualification for the tournament were made up of four stages, three preliminary rounds and a final group stage. The 21 best-ranked teams were given a bye to the group stage, while the next 26 teams began play in the second preliminary round, and four lowest ranked teams started at the first round. The three preliminary rounds were a series of playoffs, with the winners advancing.

51 nations entered the tournament (excluding initial hosts Morocco). It was the competitive debut of South Sudan. Djibouti and Somalia declined to enter.

Morocco would have automatically qualified as hosts; however, after their refusal to host, they were expelled from the tournament by the CAF. Equatorial Guinea was chosen as the new host, and despite having played in the qualifiers and been disqualified due to fielding an ineligible player, they qualified for the tournament automatically.

The defending champions Nigeria failed to qualify for the tournament.

=== Qualified teams ===
The following sixteen teams qualified for the tournament.

Country	Qualified as	Qualified on	Previous appearance in tournament^{1–2}
Equatorial Guinea	Hosts	14 November 2014	1 (2012)
South Africa	Group A winners	15 November 2014	8 (**1996**, 1998, 2000, 2002, 2004, 2006, 2008, 2013)
Congo	Group A runners-up	19 November 2014	6 (1968, **1972**, 1974, 1978, 1992, 2000)
Algeria	Group B winners	15 October 2014	15 (1968, 1980, 1982, 1984, 1986, 1988, **1990**, 1992, 1996, 1998, 2000, 2002, 2004, 2010, 2013)
Mali	Group B runners-up	19 November 2014	8 (1972, 1994, 2002, 2004, 2008, 2010, 2012, 2013)
Gabon	Group C winners	15 November 2014	5 (1994, 1996, 2000, 2010, 2012)
Burkina Faso	Group C runners-up	15 November 2014	9 (1978, 1996, 1998, 2000, 2002, 2004, 2010, 2012, 2013)
Cameroon	Group D winners	15 November 2014	16 (1970, 1972, 1982, **1984**, 1986, **1988**, 1990, 1992, 1996, 1998, **2000**, **2002**, 2004, 2006, 2008, 2010)
Ivory Coast	Group D runners-up	19 November 2014	20 (1965, 1968, 1970, 1974, 1980, 1984, 1986, 1988, 1990, **1992**, 1994, 1996, 1998, 2000, 2002, 2006, 2008, 2010, 2012, 2013)
Ghana	Group E winners	19 November 2014	19 (**1963**, **1965**, 1968, 1970, **1978**, 1980, **1982**, 1984, 1992, 1994, 1996, 1998, 2000, 2002, 2006, 2008, 2010, 2012, 2013)
Guinea	Group E runners-up	19 November 2014	10 (1970, 1974, 1976, 1980, 1994, 1998, 2004, 2006, 2008, 2012)
Cape Verde	Group F winners	15 October 2014	1 (2013)
Zambia	Group F runners-up	15 November 2014	16 (1974, 1978, 1982, 1986, 1990, 1992, 1994, 1996, 1998, 2000, 2002, 2006, 2008, 2010, **2012**, 2013)
Tunisia	Group G winners	14 November 2014	16 (1962, 1963, 1965, 1978, 1982, 1994, 1996, 1998, 2000, 2002, **2004**, 2006, 2008, 2010, 2012, 2013)
Senegal	Group G runners-up	15 November 2014	12 (1965, 1968, 1986, 1990, 1992, 1994, 2000, 2002, 2004, 2006, 2008, 2012)
DR Congo	Best third placed team	19 November 2014	16 (1965, **1968**, 1970, 1972, **1974**, 1976, 1988, 1992, 1994, 1996, 1998, 2000, 2002, 2004, 2006, 2013)

^{1} Bold indicates champion for that year.
^{2} Italic indicates host for that year.

== Venues ==
Location of the host cities of the 2021 Africa Cup of Nations
1 Bata
2 Mongomo
3 Ebibeyin
4 Malabo

The four Equatorial Guinean cities selected to host the tournament were Malabo, Bata, Mongomo and Ebibeyin.

Malabo and Bata were also host venues for the 2012 Africa Cup of Nations.

Screening for Ebola was given to all spectators attending matches.

City	Stadium	Capacity
Bata	Estadio de Bata	41,000
Mongomo	Estadio de Mongomo	15,000
Ebibeyin	Estadio de Ebibeyin	8,000
Malabo	Estadio de Malabo	20,000

== Format ==
Only the hosts got an automatic qualification spot, the other 15 teams qualified through qualification tournament. At the finals, the 16 teams were drawn into four groups of four teams each. The teams in each group played a single round robin. After the group stage, the top two teams from each group advanced to the quarterfinals. The quarterfinal winners advanced to the semifinals. The semifinal losers played in the third place match, while the semifinal winners played in the final.

== Draw ==
The finals draw was held on 3 December 2014 in Malabo. It was initially to be held on 26 November 2014 in Rabat before the change of host country.

The 16 teams were divided into four pots based on the CAF Ranking, with the hosts Equatorial Guinea placed in Pot 1 automatically. The ranking was computed using the teams' results in the 2015 Africa Cup of Nations qualifiers (weighted by 2), 2013 Africa Cup of Nations finals (weighted by 3) and qualifiers (weighted by 1), the 2012 Africa Cup of Nations finals (weighted by 2) and qualifiers (weighted by 0.5), the 2010 Africa Cup of Nations finals (weighted by 1), and the 2014 FIFA World Cup qualifiers.

Pot 1	Pot 2	Pot 3	Pot 4
Equatorial Guinea (host; assigned to A1); Ghana (48 pts); Ivory Coast (44 pts); Zambia (41 pts)	Burkina Faso (40 pts); Mali (38 pts); Tunisia (32.5 pts); Algeria (28 pts)	Cape Verde (26.5 pts); South Africa (23.5 pts); Cameroon (23.5 pts); Gabon (22 pts)	Guinea (19 pts); Senegal (19 pts); DR Congo (18 pts); Congo (13 pts)

== Match officials ==
The following referees were chosen for the 2015 Africa Cup of Nations.

Referees

- (Algeria) Mehdi Abid Charef
- (Burkina Faso) Juste Ephrem Zio
- (Cameroon) Sidi Alioum
- (Ivory Coast) Noumandiez Doué
- (Egypt) Gehad Grisha
- (Ethiopia) Bamlak Tessema Weyesa
- (Gabon) Eric Otogo-Castane
- (The Gambia) Bakary Gassama
- (Ghana) Joseph Lamptey
- (Guinea) Aboubacar Mario Bangoura
- (Madagascar) Hamada Nampiandraza
- (Mali) Koman Coulibaly
- (Mauritania) Ali Lemghaifry
- (Mauritius) Rajindraparsad Seechurn
- (Morocco) Bouchaïb El Ahrach
- (Senegal) Malang Diedhiou
- (Seychelles) Bernard Camille
- (South Africa) Victor Gomes
- (Tunisia) Med Said Kordi
- (Zambia) Janny Sikazwe

Assistant referees

- (Algeria) Albdelhak Etchiali
- (Angola) Jerson Emiliano Dos Santos
- (Burundi) Jean-Claude Birumushahu
- (Botswana) Oamogetse Godisamang
- (Cameroon) Evarist Menkouande
- (Ivory Coast) Yéo Songuifolo
- (Djibouti) Hassan Egueh Yacin
- (Egypt) Tahssen Abo El Sadat Bedyer
- (Eritrea) Angesom Ogbamariam
- (Ghana) Malik Alidu Salifu
- (Guinea) Aboubacar Doumbouya
- (Kenya) Marwa Range
- (Morocco) Redouane Achik
- (Niger) Yahaya Mahamadou
- (Nigeria) Peter Edibe
- (Rwanda) Theogene Ndagijimana
- (Senegal) Djibril Camara
- (Senegal) El Hadji Malick Samba
- (South Africa) Zakhele Siwela
- (Sudan) Ali Waleed Ahmed
- (Tunisia) Anouar Hmila

== Squads ==
Each team could register a squad of 23 players.

== Group stage ==
The group winners and runners-up advance to the quarter-finals.

Tiebreakers

The teams are ranked according to points (3 points for a win, 1 point for a draw, 0 points for a loss). If tied on points, tiebreakers are applied in the following order:

1. Number of points obtained in games between the teams concerned;
2. Goal difference in games between the teams concerned;
3. Goals scored in games between the teams concerned;
4. If, after applying criteria 1 to 3 to teams concerned, two or three teams still have an equal ranking, criteria 1 to 3 are reapplied exclusively to the matches between these teams in question to determine their final rankings. If this procedure does not lead to a decision, criteria 5 to 7 will apply;
5. Goal difference in all games;
6. Goals scored in all games;
7. Drawing of lots.

=== Group A ===
Pos	Team	Pld	W	D	L	GF	GA	GD	Pts	Qualification
1	Congo	3	2	1	0	4	2	+2	7	Advance to knockout stage
2	Equatorial Guinea (H)	3	1	2	0	3	1	+2	5	Advance to knockout stage
3	Gabon	3	1	0	2	2	3	−1	3	
4	Burkina Faso	3	0	1	2	1	4	−3	1	

Source: CAF
(H) Hosts
17 January 2015
17:00

Equatorial Guinea	1–1	Congo
Nsue 16'	Report	Bifouma 87'

Estadio de Bata, Bata
Attendance: 40,245
Referee: Bakary Gassama (Gambia)
17 January 2015
20:00

Burkina Faso	0–2	Gabon
	Report	Aubameyang 19'; Evouna 72'

Estadio de Bata, Bata
Attendance: 40,245
Referee: Rajindraparsad Seechurn (Mauritius)

21 January 2015
17:00

Equatorial Guinea	0–0	Burkina Faso
	Report

Estadio de Bata, Bata
Attendance: 39,867
Referee: Sidi Alioum (Cameroon)
21 January 2015
20:00

Gabon	0–1	Congo
	Report	Oniangué 48'

Estadio de Bata, Bata
Attendance: 34,782
Referee: Victor Gomes (South Africa)

25 January 2015
19:00

Gabon	0–2	Equatorial Guinea
	Report	Balboa 55' (pen.); Ibán 85'

Estadio de Bata, Bata
Attendance: 39,230
Referee: Noumandiez Doué (Ivory Coast)
25 January 2015
19:00

Congo	2–1	Burkina Faso
Bifouma 51'; Ondama 87'	Report	Bancé 86'

Estadio de Ebibeyin, Ebibeyin
Attendance: 7,945
Referee: Joseph Lamptey (Ghana)

=== Group B ===
Pos	Team	Pld	W	D	L	GF	GA	GD	Pts	Qualification
1	Tunisia	3	1	2	0	4	3	+1	5	Advance to knockout stage
2	DR Congo	3	0	3	0	2	2	0	3	Advance to knockout stage
3	Cape Verde	3	0	3	0	1	1	0	3	
4	Zambia	3	0	2	1	2	3	−1	2	

Source: CAF
18 January 2015
17:00

Zambia	1–1	DR Congo
Singuluma 2'	Report	Bolasie 66'

Estadio de Ebibeyin, Ebibeyin
Attendance: 7,319
Referee: Gehad Grisha (Egypt)
18 January 2015
20:00

Tunisia	1–1	Cape Verde
Manser 70'	Report	Héldon 78' (pen.)

Estadio de Ebibeyin, Ebibeyin
Attendance: 7,479
Referee: Eric Otogo-Castane (Gabon)

22 January 2015
17:00

Zambia	1–2	Tunisia
Mayuka 60'	Report	Akaïchi 70'; Chikhaoui 89'

Estadio de Ebibeyin, Ebibeyin
Attendance: 8,000
Referee: Aboubacar Mario Bangoura (Guinea)
22 January 2015
20:00

Cape Verde	0–0	DR Congo
	Report

Estadio de Ebibeyin, Ebibeyin
Attendance: 7,680
Referee: Malang Diedhiou (Senegal)

26 January 2015
19:00

Cape Verde	0–0	Zambia
	Report

Estadio de Ebibeyin, Ebibeyin
Attendance: 7,950
Referee: Sidi Alioum (Cameroon)
26 January 2015
19:00

DR Congo	1–1	Tunisia
Bokila 66'	Report	Akaïchi 31'

Estadio de Bata, Bata
Attendance: 11,463
Referee: Bakary Gassama (Gambia)

=== Group C ===
Pos	Team	Pld	W	D	L	GF	GA	GD	Pts	Qualification
1	Ghana	3	2	0	1	4	3	+1	6	Advance to knockout stage
2	Algeria	3	2	0	1	5	2	+3	6	Advance to knockout stage
3	Senegal	3	1	1	1	3	4	−1	4	
4	South Africa	3	0	1	2	3	6	−3	1	

Source: CAF
19 January 2015
17:00

Ghana	1–2	Senegal
A. Ayew 14' (pen.)	Report	Diouf 58'; Sow 90+3'

Estadio de Mongomo, Mongomo
Attendance: 13,569
Referee: Bernard Camille (Seychelles)
19 January 2015
20:00

Algeria	3–1	South Africa
Hlatshwayo 67' (o.g.); Ghoulam 72'; Slimani 83'	Report	Phala 51'

Estadio de Mongomo, Mongomo
Attendance: 12,788
Referee: Noumandiez Doué (Ivory Coast)

23 January 2015
17:00

Ghana	1–0	Algeria
Gyan 90+2'	Report

Estadio de Mongomo, Mongomo
Attendance: 12,387
Referee: Koman Coulibaly (Mali)
23 January 2015
20:00

South Africa	1–1	Senegal
Manyisa 47'	Report	Mbodj 60'

Estadio de Mongomo, Mongomo
Attendance: 13,674
Referee: Ali Lemghaifry (Mauritania)

27 January 2015
19:00

South Africa	1–2	Ghana
Masango 17'	Report	Boye 73'; A. Ayew 83'

Estadio de Mongomo, Mongomo
Attendance: 13,670
Referee: Hamada Nampiandraza (Madagascar)
27 January 2015
19:00

Senegal	0–2	Algeria
	Report	Mahrez 11'; Bentaleb 82'

Estadio de Malabo, Malabo
Attendance: 14,549
Referee: Rajindraparsad Seechurn (Mauritius)

=== Group D ===
Pos	Team	Pld	W	D	L	GF	GA	GD	Pts	Qualification
1	Ivory Coast	3	1	2	0	3	2	+1	5	Advance to knockout stage
2	Guinea	3	0	3	0	3	3	0	3 (Note: Guinea and Mali were tied on head-to-head record, overall goal difference, and overall goals scored. A drawing of lots took place on 29 January 2015, 16:00 local time at the Hilton Malabo. Guinea selected the lot for 2nd place and advanced to the quarter-finals as the group runner-up.)	Advance to knockout stage
3	Mali	3	0	3	0	3	3	0	3	
4	Cameroon	3	0	2	1	2	3	−1	2	

Source: CAF
Notes:
20 January 2015
17:00

Ivory Coast	1–1	Guinea
Doumbia 72'	Report	M. Yattara 36'

Estadio de Malabo, Malabo
Attendance: 14,875
Referee: Mehdi Abid Charef (Algeria)
20 January 2015
20:00

Mali	1–1	Cameroon
S. Yatabaré 71'	Report	Oyongo 84'

Estadio de Malabo, Malabo
Attendance: 15,000
Referee: Janny Sikazwe (Zambia)

24 January 2015
17:00

Ivory Coast	1–1	Mali
Gradel 86'	Report	Sako 7'

Estadio de Malabo, Malabo
Attendance: 14,890
Referee: Bouchaïb El Ahrach (Morocco)
24 January 2015
20:00

Cameroon	1–1	Guinea
Moukandjo 13'	Report	Traoré 42'

Estadio de Malabo, Malabo
Attendance: 15,000
Referee: Tessema Bamlak (Ethiopia)

28 January 2015
19:00

Cameroon	0–1	Ivory Coast
	Report	Gradel 35'

Estadio de Malabo, Malabo
Attendance: 15,230
Referee: Eric Otogo-Castane (Gabon)
28 January 2015
19:00

Guinea	1–1	Mali
Constant 15' (pen.)	Report	Maïga 47'

Estadio de Mongomo, Mongomo
Attendance: 13,470
Referee: Mohamed Said Kordi (Tunisia)

== Knockout stage ==
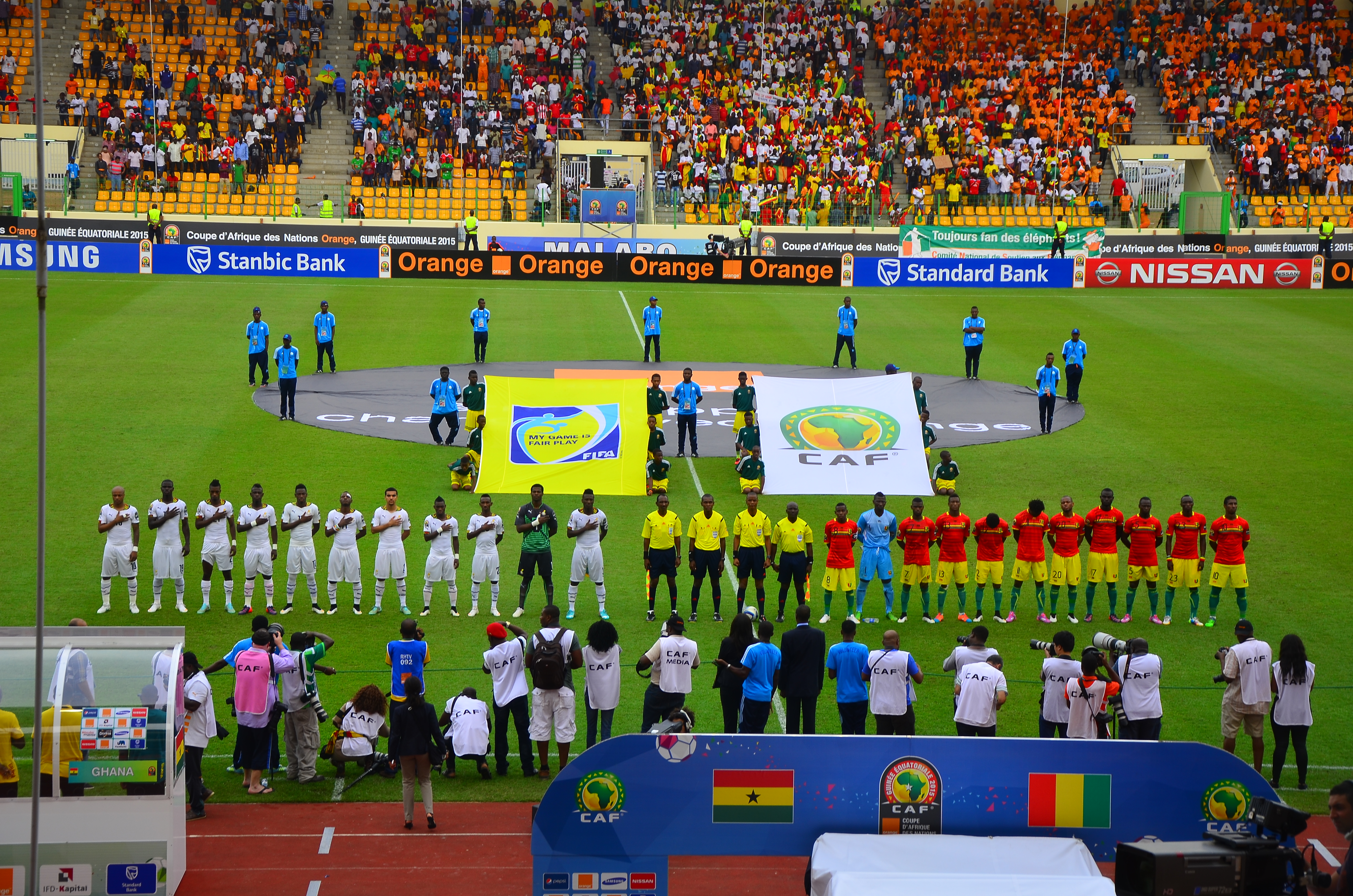
Match Ghana vs Guinea

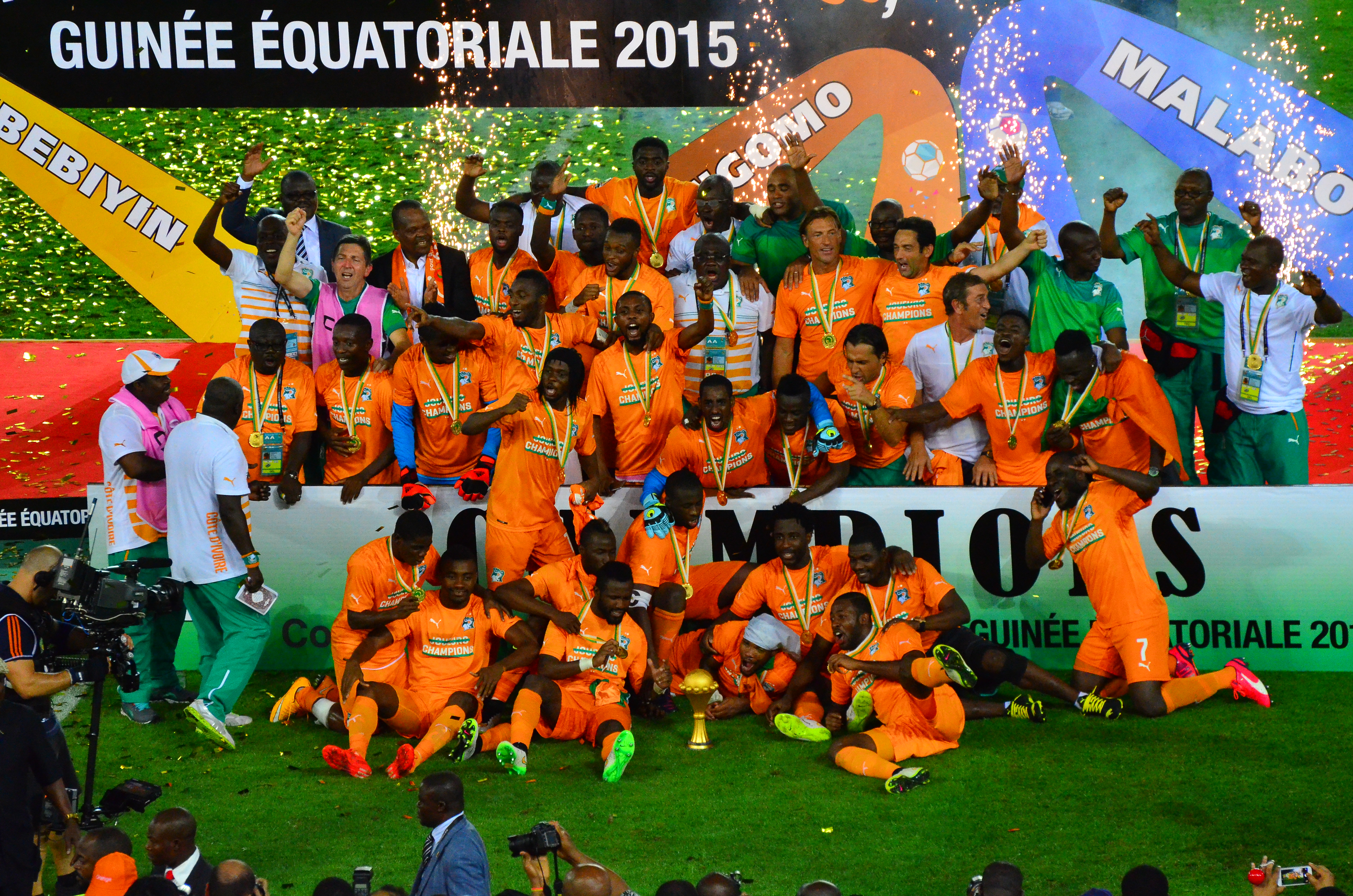
2015 Africa Cup of Nations Champions Ivory Coast

In the knockout stages, if a match is level at the end of normal playing time, extra time shall be played (two periods of 15 minutes each) and followed, if necessary, by kicks from the penalty mark to determine the winner, except for the play-off for third place where no extra time shall be played.

On 27 January 2015, the CAF announced that they had relocated the venues of two of the quarter-finals:

- The venue of quarter-final 2 is relocated from Estadio de Ebibeyin, Ebibeyin to Estadio de Bata, Bata.
- The venue of quarter-final 3 is relocated from Estadio de Mongomo, Mongomo to Estadio de Malabo, Malabo.

The kick-off time of quarter-finals 2 and 4 are also changed from 20:00 to 20:30 local time.

=== Bracket ===
Quarter-finals
31 January – Bata
Congo	2
DR Congo	4
1 February – Malabo
Ivory Coast	3
Algeria	1
1 February – Malabo
Ghana	3
Guinea	0
31 January – Bata
Tunisia	1
Equatorial Guinea (a.e.t.)	2

Semi-finals
4 February – Bata
DR Congo	1
Ivory Coast	3
5 February – Malabo
Ghana	3
Equatorial Guinea	0

Final
8 February – Bata
Ivory Coast (p)	0 (9)
Ghana	0 (8)
Third place play-off
7 February – Malabo
DR Congo (p)	0 (4)
Equatorial Guinea	0 (2)

=== Quarter-finals ===
31 January 2015
17:00

Congo	2–4	DR Congo
Doré 55'; Bifouma 62'	Report	Mbokani 65', 90+1'; Bokila 75'; Kimwaki 81'

Estadio de Bata, Bata
Attendance: 31,670
Referee: Bernard Camille (Seychelles)

31 January 2015
20:30

Tunisia	1–2 (a.e.t.)	Equatorial Guinea
Akaïchi 70'	Report	Balboa 90+3' (pen.), 102'

Estadio de Bata, Bata
Attendance: 41,000
Referee: Rajindraparsad Seechurn (Mauritius)

1 February 2015
17:00

Ghana	3–0	Guinea
Atsu 4', 61'; Appiah 44'	Report

Estadio de Malabo, Malabo
Attendance: 14,500
Referee: Janny Sikazwe (Zambia)

1 February 2015
20:30

Ivory Coast	3–1	Algeria
Bony 26', 68'; Gervinho 90+4'	Report	Soudani 51'

Estadio de Malabo, Malabo
Attendance: 15,000
Referee: Bakary Gassama (Gambia)

=== Semi-finals ===
4 February 2015
20:00

DR Congo	1–3	Ivory Coast
Mbokani 24' (pen.)	Report	Y. Touré 20'; Gervinho 41'; Kanon 68'

Estadio de Bata, Bata
Attendance: 30,000
Referee: Néant Alioum (Cameroon)

5 February 2015
20:00

Ghana	3–0	Equatorial Guinea
J. Ayew 42' (pen.); Wakaso 45+1'; A. Ayew 75'	Report

Estadio de Malabo, Malabo
Attendance: 15,250
Referee: Eric Otogo-Castane (Gabon)

=== Third place play-off ===
7 February 2015
17:00

DR Congo	0–0	Equatorial Guinea
	Report
Penalties
Mabwati (penalty scored); Mabidi (penalty scored); Mbemba (penalty scored); Mongongu (penalty scored)	4–2	(penalty missed) Balboa; (penalty missed) Fabiani; (penalty scored) Juvenal; (penalty scored) Ellong

Estadio de Malabo, Malabo
Referee: Gehad Grisha (Egypt)

=== Final ===
8 February 2015
20:00

Ivory Coast	0–0 (a.e.t.)	Ghana
	Report
Penalties
Bony (penalty missed); Gadji (penalty missed); Aurier (penalty scored); Doumbia (penalty scored); Y. Touré (penalty scored); Kalou (penalty scored); K. Touré (penalty scored); Kanon (penalty scored); Bailly (penalty scored); Dié (penalty scored); Barry (penalty scored)	9–8	(penalty scored) Wakaso; (penalty scored) J. Ayew; (penalty missed) Acquah; (penalty missed) Acheampong; (penalty scored) A. Ayew; (penalty scored) Mensah; (penalty scored) Badu; (penalty scored) Afful; (penalty scored) Rahman; (penalty scored) Boye; (penalty missed) Razak

Estadio de Bata, Bata
Attendance: 32,857
Referee: Bakary Gassama (Gambia)

== Statistics ==
=== Goalscorers ===
3 goals

- (Republic of the Congo) Thievy Bifouma
- (Democratic Republic of the Congo) Dieumerci Mbokani
- (Equatorial Guinea) Javier Balboa
- (Ghana) André Ayew
- (Tunisia) Ahmed Akaïchi

2 goals

- (Democratic Republic of the Congo) Jeremy Bokila
- (Ghana) Christian Atsu
- (Ivory Coast) Wilfried Bony
- (Ivory Coast) Gervinho
- (Ivory Coast) Max Gradel

1 goal

- (Algeria) Nabil Bentaleb
- (Algeria) Faouzi Ghoulam
- (Algeria) Riyad Mahrez
- (Algeria) Islam Slimani
- (Algeria) Hillal Soudani
- (Burkina Faso) Aristide Bancé
- (Cameroon) Benjamin Moukandjo
- (Cameroon) Ambroise Oyongo
- (Cape Verde) Héldon
- (Republic of the Congo) Férébory Doré
- (Republic of the Congo) Fabrice Ondama
- (Republic of the Congo) Prince Oniangue
- (Democratic Republic of the Congo) Yannick Bolasie
- (Democratic Republic of the Congo) Joël Kimwaki
- (Equatorial Guinea) Emilio Nsue
- (Equatorial Guinea) Ibán Edú
- (Gabon) Pierre-Emerick Aubameyang
- (Gabon) Malick Evouna
- (Ghana) Kwesi Appiah
- (Ghana) Jordan Ayew
- (Ghana) John Boye
- (Ghana) Asamoah Gyan
- (Ghana) Mubarak Wakaso
- (Guinea) Kévin Constant
- (Guinea) Ibrahima Traoré
- (Guinea) Mohamed Yattara
- (Ivory Coast) Seydou Doumbia
- (Ivory Coast) Wilfried Kanon
- (Ivory Coast) Yaya Touré
- (Mali) Bakary Sako
- (Mali) Modibo Maïga
- (Mali) Sambou Yatabaré
- (Senegal) Mame Biram Diouf
- (Senegal) Kara Mbodj
- (Senegal) Moussa Sow
- (South Africa) Oupa Manyisa
- (South Africa) Mandla Masango
- (South Africa) Thuso Phala
- (Tunisia) Yassine Chikhaoui
- (Tunisia) Mohamed Ali Moncer
- (Zambia) Emmanuel Mayuka
- (Zambia) Given Singuluma

1 own goal

- (South Africa) Thulani Hlatshwayo (against Algeria)

=== Discipline ===
A player was automatically suspended for the next match for the following offences:

- Receiving a red card (red card suspensions could be extended for serious offences)
- Receiving two yellow cards in two matches
- After the end of the group matches, all cautions received were cancelled for the rest of the competition. Nevertheless, a player having collected two yellow cards sustained the one match suspension.

The following suspensions occurred during the tournament:

Player(s)/Official(s)	Offence(s)	Suspension(s)
Group stage suspensions
(Ivory Coast) Gervinho	(red card) in Group D vs Guinea (matchday 1; 20 January 2015)	Group D vs Mali (matchday 2; 24 January 2015); Group D vs Cameroon (matchday 3; 28 January 2015)
(Equatorial Guinea) Diosdado Mbele	(yellow card) in Group A vs Congo (matchday 1; 17 January 2015); (yellow card) in Group A vs Burkina Faso (matchday 2; 21 January 2015)	Group A vs Gabon (matchday 3; 25 January 2015)
(Republic of the Congo) Boris Moubhibo	(yellow card) in Group A vs Equatorial Guinea (matchday 1; 17 January 2015); (yellow card) in Group A vs Gabon (matchday 2; 21 January 2015)	Group A vs Burkina Faso (matchday 3; 25 January 2015)
(Ivory Coast) Cheick Tioté	(yellow card) in Group D vs Guinea (matchday 1; 20 January 2015); (yellow card) in Group D vs Mali (matchday 2; 24 January 2015)	Group D vs Cameroon (matchday 3; 28 January 2015)
Knockout stage suspensions
(Guinea) Naby Yattara	(red card) in Quarter-finals vs Ghana (1 February 2015)	Suspension served outside tournament
(Equatorial Guinea) Ibán	(yellow card) in Quarter-finals vs Tunisia (31 January 2015); (yellow card) in Semi-finals vs Ghana (5 February 2015)	Third place play-off vs DR Congo (7 February 2015)

=== Awards ===
Pepsi Highest Scorer

- (Ghana) André Ayew

Player name	Games played	Goals scored	Assists	Minutes played	Source
(Ghana) André Ayew	6	3	2		
(Republic of the Congo) Thievy Bifouma	4	3			
(Tunisia) Ahmed Akaïchi	4	3			
(Democratic Republic of the Congo) Dieumerci Mbokani	6	3	1		
(Equatorial Guinea) Javier Balboa	6	3			

Orange Man of the Competition

- (Ghana) Christian Atsu

Best Goalkeeper

- (Ivory Coast) Sylvain Gbohouo

Nissan Goal of the tournament

- (Ghana) Christian Atsu vs Guinea (3rd goal of the match)

Samsung Fair Player of the Tournament

- (Ghana) Kwesi Appiah

Fair Play of the tournament
DR Congo

CAF Team of the Tournament

Goalkeeper	Defenders	Midfielders	Forwards
(Ivory Coast) Sylvain Gbohouo (Democratic Republic of the Congo) Robert Kidiaba	(Ivory Coast) Serge Aurier (Ghana) Harrison Afful (Ivory Coast) Kolo Touré	(Ghana) André Ayew (Ivory Coast) Yaya Touré (Ivory Coast) Max Gradel (Democratic Republic of the Congo) Yannick Bolasie (Ivory Coast) Gervinho	(Ghana) Christian Atsu (Ivory Coast) Wilfried Bony

=== Tournament rankings ===
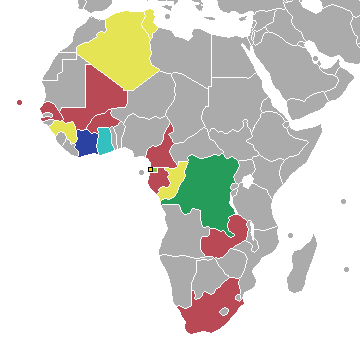
Champion Runner-up Third place Fourth place Quarter-finals Group stage

Ranking criteria
For teams eliminated in the same knockout round, the following criteria are applied, in the order given, to determine the final rankings:
1. Goal difference in round eliminated;
2. Goals scored in round eliminated;
3. If teams eliminated in the semi-finals or quarter-finals are tied, the above criteria are reapplied for the previous knockout round, with this process repeated once more should two semi-finalists remain tied;
4. Points in group stage;
5. Goal difference in group stage;
6. Goals scored in group stage;
7. Disciplinary points.

For teams eliminated in the group stage, the following criteria are applied, in the order given, to determine the final rankings:

1. Position in group;
2. Points;
3. Goal difference;
4. Goals scored;
5. Disciplinary points.

Pos.	Team	G	Pld	W	D	L	Pts	GF	GA	GD
1	Ivory Coast	D	6	3	3	0	12	9	4	+5
2	Ghana	C	6	4	1	1	13	10	3	+7
3	DR Congo	B	6	1	4	1	7	7	7	0
4	Equatorial Guinea	A	6	2	3	1	9	5	5	0
Eliminated in the quarter-finals
5	Congo	A	4	2	1	1	7	6	6	0
6	Algeria	C	4	2	0	2	6	6	5	+1
7	Tunisia	B	4	1	2	1	5	5	5	0
8	Guinea	D	4	0	3	1	3	3	6	−3
Eliminated in the group stage
9	Senegal	C	3	1	1	1	4	3	4	−1
10	Mali	D	3	0	3	0	3	3	3	0
11	Cape Verde	B	3	0	3	0	3	1	1	0
12	Gabon	A	3	1	0	2	3	2	3	−1
13	Cameroon	D	3	0	2	1	2	2	3	−1
14	Zambia	B	3	0	2	1	2	2	3	−1
15	South Africa	C	3	0	1	2	1	3	6	−3
16	Burkina Faso	A	3	0	1	2	1	1	4	−3

=== Discipline ===
In the final tournament, a player was suspended for the subsequent match in the competition for either getting red card or accumulating two yellow cards in two different matches. The disciplinary panel has the ability to increase the automatic one match ban for a red card (e.g. for violent conduct). Single yellow card cautions were erased at the conclusion of the group stage, and were not carried over to the knockout stage. The following players were or are suspended during the final tournament – for one or more games – as a result of red cards or yellow card accumulations:

Player	Offence	Suspension
(Burkina Faso) Florent Rouamba	Carried over from qualification	Group A vs Gabon
(Zambia) Donashano Malama	Carried over from qualification	Group B vs DR Congo
(South Africa) Eric Mathoho	Carried over from qualification	Group C vs Algeria
(South Africa) Reneilwe Letsholonyane	Carried over from qualification	Group C vs Algeria
(Guinea) Seydouba Soumah	Carried over from qualification	Group D vs Ivory Coast
(Ivory Coast) Gervinho	(red card) vs Guinea	Group D vs Mali; Group D vs Cameroon
(Equatorial Guinea) Diosdado Mbele	(yellow card) vs Congo; (yellow card) vs Burkina Faso	Group A vs Gabon
(Republic of the Congo) Boris Moubhibo	(yellow card) vs Equatorial Guinea; (yellow card) vs Gabon	Group A vs Burkina Faso
(Ivory Coast) Cheick Tioté	(yellow card) vs Guinea; (yellow card) vs Mali	Group D vs Cameroon
(Guinea) Naby Yattara	(red card) vs Ghana	Africa Cup of Nations qualifying
(Equatorial Guinea) Ibán	(yellow card) vs Tunisia; (yellow card) vs Ghana	Third place play-off vs DR Congo

== Marketing ==
=== Sponsorship ===
The 2015 Africa Cup of Nations has one title sponsor and seven official sponsors as shown below.

Title sponsor	Official sponsors
Orange S.A.	IFD Kapital Group; Pepsi; Pan Atlantic Exploration; Doritos; Nissan; Samsung; Standard Bank

== Match ball ==
The new Adidas Africa Cup Ball is called Adidas Marhaba (meaning Welcome, in Arabic). The Africa Cup 2015 Ball was unveiled 26 November 2014 following the controversy about the host situation for the 2015 Africa Cup of Nations.

== Mascot ==
The official mascot of the tournament was "Chuku Chuku", a porcupine.

== Opening ceremony ==
The opening ceremony of the 2015 Africa Cup of Nations took place on 17 January, at the Estadio de Bata, before the opening match of the tournament between hosts Equatorial Guinea and Congo.

== Controversies ==
=== Drawing of lots ===
Guinea and Mali finished with equal records in Group D, thus the drawing of lots was required to choose who would advance into the quarter-finals. Prior to the draw, Mali coach Henryk Kasperczak said that the tournament "must find a more sporting way [to decide who advances], fairer...This does not correspond to a sporting spirit". His Guinean counterpart Michel Dussuyer said that neither team deserved to be eliminated in that manner.

Guinea won the draw, causing a complaint from Boubacar Diarra, president of the Malian FA. Issa Haytou, president of CAF, defended the process as the only option.

The CAF Disciplinary Committee's South African President Raymond Hack stated that CAF's Member Associations had chosen the option of picking lots ahead of penalties six months prior. He also said that the "Fair Play [disciplinary] table was to be used but the countries object to that and they said the table must be taken out of the rules. Had the Fair play table been used, Guinea would have qualified ahead of Mali with a better disciplinary record."

=== Tunisia vs. Equatorial Guinea refereeing ===
Wadie Jary, the president of the Tunisian Football Federation, claimed that there was a bias against Tunisia following their controversial quarter-final defeat to Equatorial Guinea on 31 January 2015. He was banned from CAF competitions and activities. Rajindraparsad Seechurn, the Mauritian referee who gave a penalty to Equatorial Guinea in that match, was banned from officiating for six months and removed from CAF's elite register of referees. The Tunisian FA was fined $50,000 for confronting the referee during the match, in addition to damage to changing room facilities, while Equatorial Guinea was fined $5,000 for inadequate security at the stadium.

=== Equatorial Guinea vs. Ghana crowd incidents ===
During the semi-final fixture between host nation of Equatorial Guinea and Ghana several incidents occurred between the home fans, visiting fans and police. At the half-time break with Ghana leading the game 2–0, the Ghanaian players were protected from hostile Equatoguinean fans by police using plastic shields.

During the 82nd minute in the second half, fans rushed onto the pitch and missiles were thrown at the Ghanaian substitute players. The players moved onto the pitch to escape the missiles. The travelling Ghanaian fans were also targets and took shelter near the goal of the pitch, out of the range of those throwing objects. A helicopter was dispatched and used to disperse spectators out of the stadium by hovering at a low height above them. The Ghanaian FA described the incident as being similar to a "war zone".

Equatorial Guinea's Police force had fired smoke bombs into the stands in an attempt to bring order. The game was stopped for about 30 minutes, before recommencing for a few minutes.

CAF imposed a US$100k fine on the Equatoguinean Football Federation and were informed an 'official match' in Equatorial Guinea must be held 'behind closed doors' after the tournament's completion.

DR Congo defender Gabriel Zakuani stated that he would rather his team forfeit the third-place playoff instead of play in front of Equatorial Guinea's fans, an opinion which was not shared by his manager Florent Ibengé.
