= Kévin Constant =

Guinean footballer (born 1987)

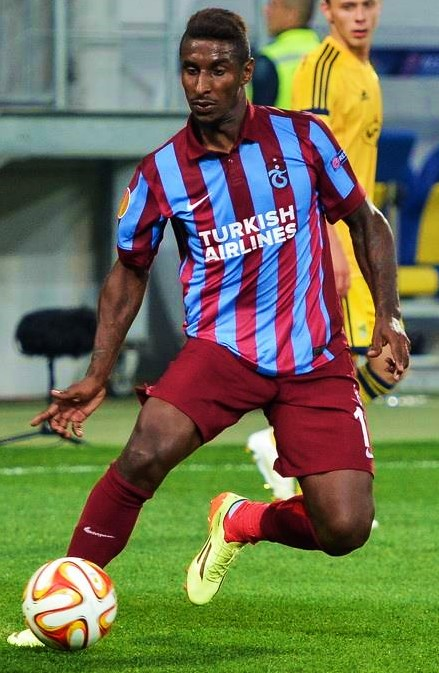
- Constant with Trabzonspor in 2014

Personal information
- Date of birth: 10 May 1987 (age 39)
- Place of birth: Fréjus, France
- Height: 1.84 m (6 ft 0 in)
- Positions: Midfielder; left-back

Youth career
- Toulouse

Senior career*
Years	Team	Apps	(Gls)
2006–2008	Toulouse	4	(0)
2008–2011	Châteauroux	79	(15)
2010–2011	→ ChievoVerona (loan)	32	(2)
2011	ChievoVerona	0	(0)
2011–2012	Genoa	21	(1)
2012–2014	AC Milan	45	(0)
2014–2015	Trabzonspor	22	(0)
2016	Bologna	7	(0)
2017–2019	Sion	18	(2)
2019	Tractor	0	(0)
Total		228	(20)

International career
2004	France U17	3	(1)
2007–2018	Guinea	28	(5)
Medal record
Men's football
Representing France
UEFA European Under-17 Championship
Winner	2004 France
- * Club domestic league appearances and goals

Kévin Constant (born 10 May 1987) is a former professional footballer who played as a midfielder or left-back. Born in France, he played for the Guinea national team.

Having come through the Toulouse youth system, he left for Châteauroux in 2008. He moved to Italy in 2010 playing for ChievoVerona, Genoa, and AC Milan. Following a stint at Trabzonspor in Turkey, he returned to Italy's Bologna in 2016 before joining FC Sion in Switzerland in 2017. In 2019, he was contracted to Iranian club Tractor but never played for the club.

== Club career ==
=== Toulouse ===
Constant progressed through the ranks of the reserves. In 2006, he was promoted to Toulouse's first-team squad.

=== Châteauroux ===
In 2008, Constant moved to Ligue 2 side Châteauroux.

=== ChievoVerona ===
In September 2010, Constant was signed by Italian club ChievoVerona on a loan deal, ultimately made permanent in June 2011.

=== Genoa ===
On 1 July 2011, Constant made a move to Genoa for €5.6 million cash, with Francesco Acerbi (tagged for €2 million) and Ivan Fatić (tagged for €200,000) moving the other way to Chievo. Genoa, however, bought Acerbi outright from Reggina for €2.2 million, which would make Constant worth €8 million.

=== AC Milan ===
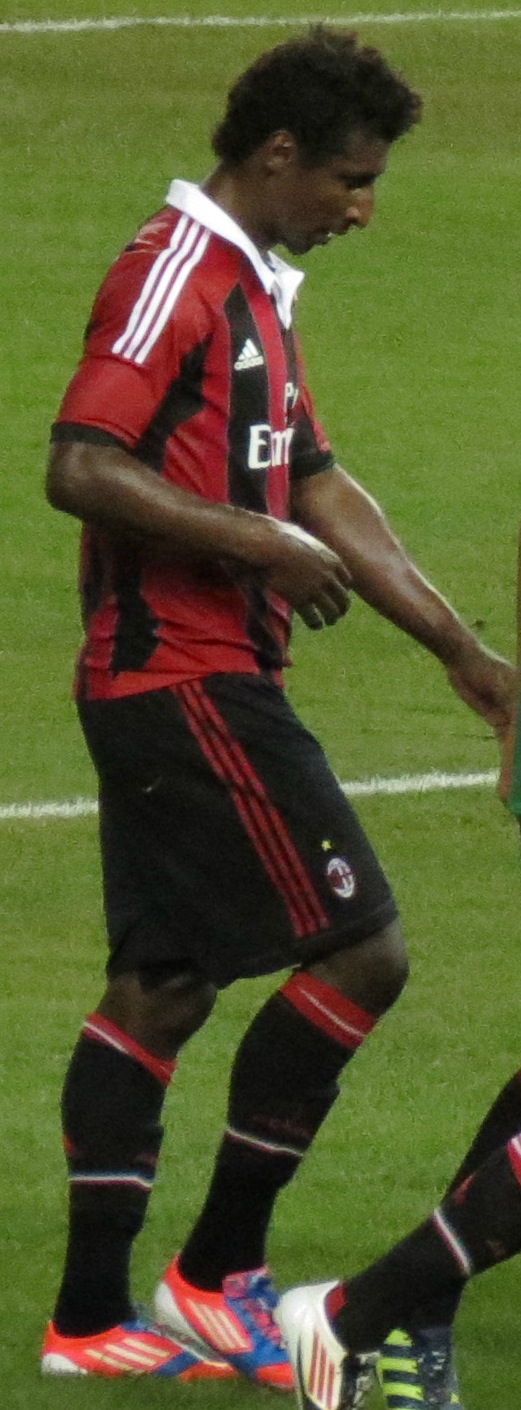
Constant with AC Milan in 2012

On 20 June 2012, Constant moved to AC Milan on a loan deal, which carried an option to buy. On 26 January 2013, Milan entered into co-ownership with Genoa for Constant in exchange for the termination of Francesco Acerbi's co-ownership, both for €4 million fees. On 27 July 2013, Milan purchased Constant outright for another €6 million, also selling Rodney Strasser to Genoa for €3.5 million on the same day.

In July 2013, Constant responded to what he perceived as racial abuse from spectators at a pre-season TIM Trophy match against Sassuolo by leaving the pitch. Although the Italian Football Federation (FIGC) fined Sassuolo €30,000 due to "racially discriminatory shouts and chants aimed at a player from the opposition's team", a police investigation found no evidence of such.

=== Trabzonspor ===
Constant transferred to Turkish Süper Lig club Trabzonspor for a €2.5 million transfer fee in 2014, signing a four-year contract worth an annual average of €2.25 million. He made his official debut for the club against Russian side Rostov in the play-off qualifying round for the 2014–15 UEFA Europa League. Constant's contract was later terminated on 18 November 2015 for €2 million.

=== Bologna ===
On 1 February 2016, Constant returned to Italy after signing with Bologna on a 2 1/2-year deal.

=== Tractor ===
On 4 January 2019, Constant signed a 3.5-year contract with Tractor of the Persian Gulf Pro League. In June, Constant's contract was terminated after he failed a medical test at the club.

=== Retirement ===
In January 2020, Constant announced his retirement as a player at the age of 32 citing "personal reasons".

== International career ==
Constant began representing the French under-17 squad in 2004.

Qualified to play for the Guinea senior team through his mother he made his debut on 14 October 2007, in a 1–3 friendly loss against Senegal. On 10 October 2010, Constant scored his second goal in a 2012 Africa Cup of Nations qualification against Nigeria.

== Career statistics ==
=== Club ===
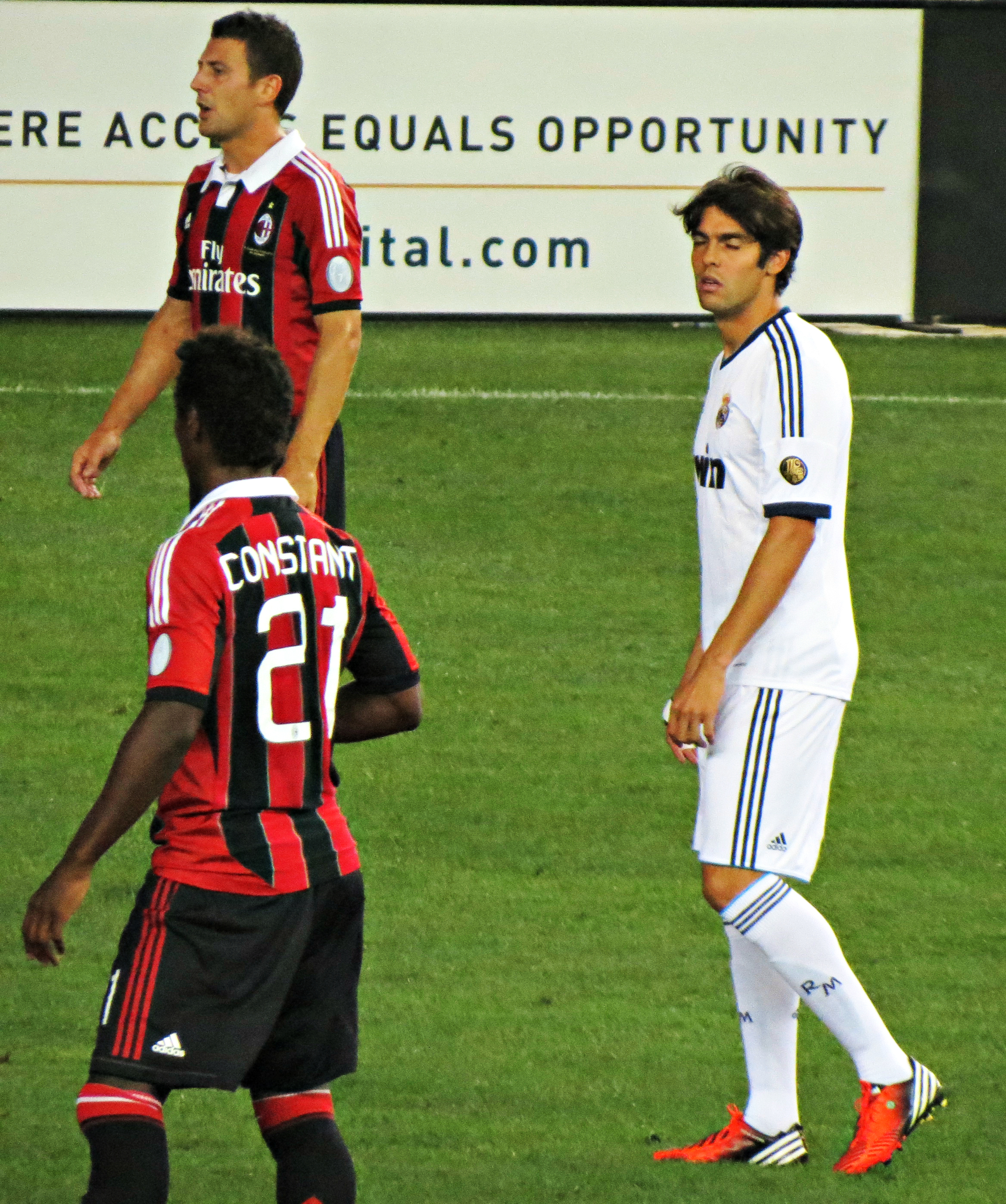
Constant playing for AC Milan against Real Madrid in 2012.

Appearances and goals by club, season and competition
Club	Season	League			Cup (Note: Includes Coppa Italia, and Coupe de France matches)		League Cup (Note: Includes Coupe de la Ligue matches)		Europe		Total	
Club	Season	Division	Apps	Goals	Apps	Goals	Apps	Goals	Apps	Goals	Apps	Goals
Toulouse	2006–07	Ligue 1	2	0	0	0	0	0	0	0	2	0
Toulouse	2007–08	Ligue 1	2	0	0	0	0	0	0	0	2	0
Toulouse	Total		4	0	0	0	0	0	0	0	4	0
Châteauroux	2007–08	Ligue 2	13	1	0	0	0	0	0	0	13	1
Châteauroux	2008–09	Ligue 2	28	4	0	0	0	0	0	0	28	4
Châteauroux	2009–10	Ligue 2	34	10	0	0	1	0	0	0	35	10
Châteauroux	2010–11	Ligue 2	4	0	0	0	0	0	0	0	4	0
Châteauroux	Total		79	15	0	0	1	0	0	0	80	15
ChievoVerona	2010–11	Serie A	32	2	0	0	0	0	0	0	32	2
Genoa	2011–12	Serie A	21	1	3	0	0	0	0	0	24	1
AC Milan	2012–13	Serie A	25	0	0	0	0	0	6	0	31	0
AC Milan	2013–14	Serie A	20	0	0	0	0	0	6	0	26	0
AC Milan	Total		45	0	0	0	0	0	12	0	57	0
Trabzonspor	2014–15	Süper Lig	14	0	2	0	0	0	6	2	22	2
Trabzonspor	2015–16	Süper Lig	8	0	0	0	0	0	3	0	11	0
Trabzonspor	Total		22	0	2	0	0	0	9	2	33	2
Bologna	2015–16	Serie A	7	0	0	0	0	0	0	0	7	0
Sion	2016–17	Swiss Super League	11	2	2	0	0	0	0	0	13	2
Sion	2017–18	Swiss Super League	7	0	1	0	0	0	1	0	9	0
Sion	Total		18	2	3	0	0	0	1	0	22	2
Tractor	2018–19	Persian Gulf Pro League	0	0	0	0	0	0	0	0	0	0
Career total			228	20	8	0	1	0	22	2	259	22

=== International ===
Appearances and goals by national team and year
National team	Year	Apps	Goals
Guinea	2007	1	0
Guinea	2008	1	0
Guinea	2009	4	0
Guinea	2010	3	2
Guinea	2011	5	0
Guinea	2012	1	0
Guinea	2013	2	0
Guinea	2014	1	1
Guinea	2015	5	1
Guinea	2018	1	0
Total		24	4

Scores and results list Guinea's goal tally first, score column indicates score after each Constant goal.

List of international goals scored by Kévin Constant
No.	Date	Venue	Opponent	Score	Result	Competition
1	11 August 2010	Stade Saint-Exupéry, Marignane, France	Mali	2–0	2–0	Friendly
2	10 October 2010	Stade du 28 Septembre, Conakry, Guinea	Nigeria	1–0	1–0	2012 African Cup of Nations qualification
3	5 March 2014	Azadi Stadium, Tehran, Iran	Iran	1–0	2–1	Friendly
4	13 January 2015	Stade Larbi Benbarek, Casablanca, Morocco	Senegal	1–4	2–5	Friendly
5	28 January 2015	Estadio de Mongomo, Mongomo, Equatorial Guinea	Mali	1–0	1–1	2015 Africa Cup of Nations

== Honours ==
France U17

- UEFA European Under-17 Championship: 2004
