= Sambou Yatabaré =

Malian footballer (born 1989)

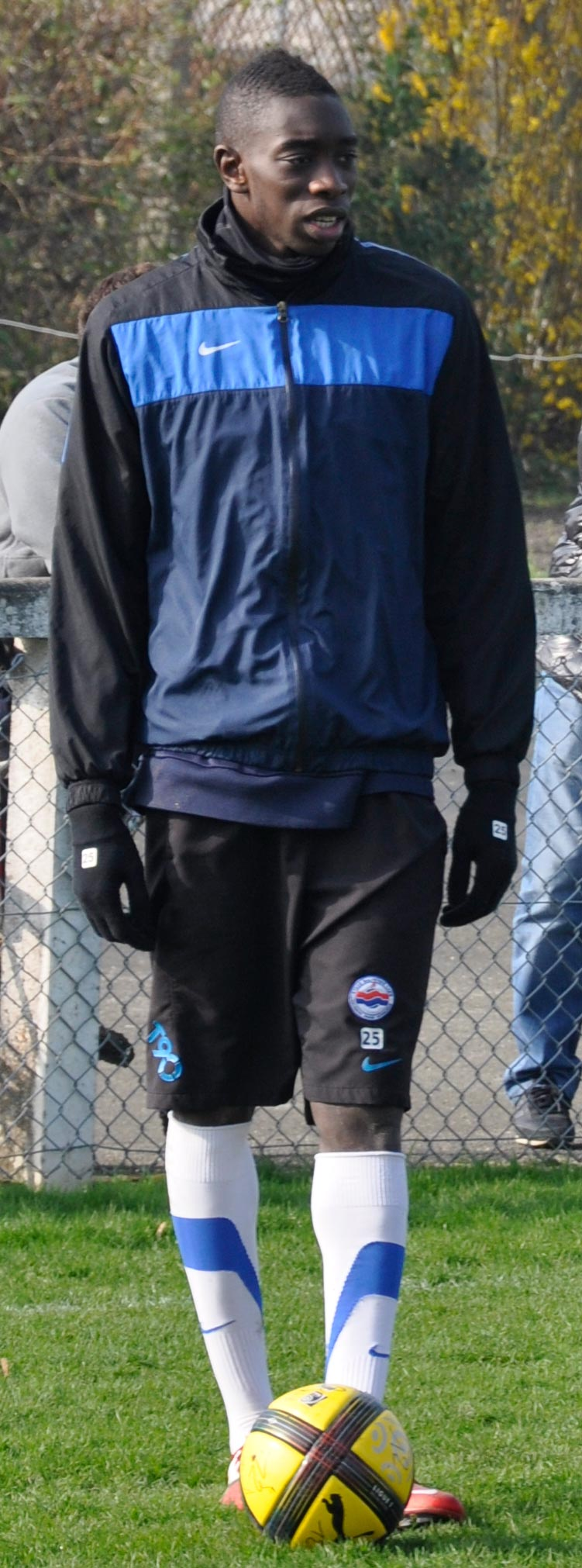
- Yatabaré training with Caen in 2011

Personal information
- Date of birth: 2 March 1989 (age 37)
- Place of birth: Beauvais, France
- Height: 1.90 m (6 ft 3 in)
- Position: Midfielder

Team information
- Current team: L'Aumône

Senior career*
Years	Team	Apps	(Gls)
2008–2011	Caen	57	(3)
2011–2012	Monaco	9	(1)
2012–2013	Bastia	31	(1)
2013–2016	Olympiacos	5	(1)
2014	→ Bastia (loan)	13	(1)
2014–2015	→ Guingamp (loan)	19	(1)
2015	→ Standard Liège (loan)	13	(0)
2016–2018	Werder Bremen	10	(1)
2016–2018	Werder Bremen II	11	(3)
2017–2018	→ Antwerp (loan)	20	(1)
2018–2020	Antwerp	17	(1)
2021	Amiens	4	(0)
2021–2022	Valenciennes	26	(3)
2022–2023	Sochaux	2	(0)
2022–2023	Sochaux II	3	(1)
2023–2024	Gençlerbirliği	7	(1)
2024–	L'Aumône	6	(0)

International career^{‡}
2008–	Mali	32	(4)
- * Club domestic league appearances and goals as of 2 November 2024 ‡ National team caps and goals as of 27 March 2017

Sambou Yatabaré (born 2 March 1989) is a professional footballer who plays as a midfielder for Championnat National 3 club L'Aumône. Born in France, he represents Mali at international level.

== Club career ==
Yatabaré has played for Caen, Monaco and Bastia.

=== Olympiacos and loans ===
On 30 August 2013, he signed a four-year contract with Greek side Olympiacos F.C., for a reported fee of €2.2 million. Six months later, lacking game-time in Greece, Yatabaré was sent back to Bastia on loan for six months where he made his return in the first team against Bordeaux on 18 January 2014. He spent the 2014–15 season in Ligue 1 with Guingamp. On 1 September 2015, he signed a year-long loan deal with Standard Liège.

=== Werder Bremen ===
On 28 January 2016, Yatabaré signed for Werder Bremen on a 3 1/2-year contract running until 2019. While the transfer fee was reported as €2.5 million, Standard Liège also stated they had received €500,000 in compensation from Bremen to end the player's loan with the club.

==== Royal Antwerp (loan) ====
On 31 August 2017, the last day of the German summer transfer window, Yatabaré joined Royal Antwerp on loan for the 2017–18 season. His new club was given the option to sign him permanently.

In March 2018, Werder Bremen's sporting director Frank Baumann confirmed Yatabaré would join Antwerp permanently in the summer.

=== Sochaux ===
On 27 June 2022, Yatabaré joined Sochaux on a two-year contract.

== International career ==
Yatabaré was eligible to play for the national teams of either France or Mali, making his international debut for Mali in 2008.

Yatabaré represented Mali at the 2015 Africa Cup of Nations, scoring the team's first goal of the tournament in a 1–1 draw with Cameroon on 20 January 2015.

== Personal life ==
Yatabaré was born in France to a Malian father and Senegalese mother. His brother, Mustapha, is also a professional footballer, who has played for the Mali national side.

== Career statistics ==
=== Club ===
As of 22 September 2020

Appearances and goals by club, season and competition
Club	Season	League			Cup		Other		Total	
Club	Season	Division	Apps	Goals	Apps	Goals	Apps	Goals	Apps	Goals
Caen	2008–09	Ligue 1	11	1	—		—		11	1
Caen	2009–10	Ligue 2	21	0	4	0	—		25	0
Caen	2010–11	Ligue 1	25	2	1	1	—		26	3
Caen	Total		57	3	5	1	0	0	62	4
Monaco	2011–12	Ligue 2	9	1	1	0	—		10	1
Bastia	2012–13	Ligue 1	28	1	1	0	—		29	1
Bastia	2013–14	Ligue 1	3	0	—		—		3	0
Bastia	Total		31	1	1	0	0	0	32	1
Olympiacos	2013–14	Super League Greece	5	1	2	1	3 (Note: Appearances in the UEFA Champions League)	0	10	2
Bastia	2013–14	Ligue 1	13	1	—		—		13	1
Guingamp	2014–15	Ligue 1	19	1	2	0	8	0	29	1
Standard Liège	2015–16	Belgian Pro League	13	0	3	0	—		16	0
Werder Bremen	2015–16	Bundesliga	8	1	1	0	—		9	1
Werder Bremen	2016–17	Bundesliga	2	0	1	0	—		3	0
Werder Bremen	Total		10	1	2	0	0	0	12	1
Werder Bremen II	2016–17	3. Liga	11	3	—		—		11	3
Antwerp (loan)	2017–18	Belgian First Division A	20	1	2	0	—		22	1
Antwerp	2018–19	Belgian First Division A	17	1	0	0	4 (Note: Appearances in the Belgian First Division A play-offs)	0	21	1
Career total			205	14	18	2	15	0	238	16

=== International goals ===
Scores and results list Mali's goal tally first, score column indicates score after each Yatabaré goal.

List of international goals scored by Sambou Yatabaré
No.	Date	Venue	Opponent	Score	Result	Competition
1	11 October 2014	Addis Ababa Stadium, Addis Ababa, Ethiopia	Ethiopia	2–0	2–0	2015 Africa Cup of Nations qualification
2	20 January 2015	Estadio de Malabo, Malabo, Equatorial Guinea	Cameroon	1–0	1–1	2015 Africa Cup of Nations
3	4 September 2016	Stade du 26 Mars, Bamako, Mali	Benin	1–0	5–2	2017 Africa Cup of Nations qualification
4	8 October 2016	Stade Bouaké, Bouaké, Ivory Coast	Ivory Coast	1–0	1–3	2018 FIFA World Cup qualification

== Honours ==
Mali

- Africa Cup of Nations bronze: 2013
