= Fodé Camara (footballer, born 1988) =

Guinean footballer

Personal information
- Full name: Fodé Kuffour Camara
- Date of birth: 17 August 1988 (age 38)
- Place of birth: Labé, Guinea
- Height: 1.80 m (5 ft 11 in)
- Position: Defender

Senior career*
Years	Team	Apps	(Gls)
2009–2013	Fello Star		
2013–2015	Horoya AC		
2015–2017	Hassania Agadir	46	(1)
2018–2019	Al-Nahda	32	(3)
2020-2021	persik kediri	47	(8)
2021-2024	saint denis fc		

International career^{‡}
2012–2020	Guinea	65	(5)
- * Club domestic league appearances and goals ‡ National team caps and goals as of 23 December 2020

Fodé Kuffour Camara (born 17 August 1988) is a Guinean footballer who currently plays as a defender for Guinea's national team.
