= Jérôme Guihoata =

Cameroonian footballer

Personal information
- Full name: Jérôme Guihoata
- Date of birth: 7 October 1994 (age 32)
- Place of birth: Yaoundé, Cameroon
- Height: 1.83 m (6 ft 0 in)
- Position: Centre back

Team information
- Current team: Akritas Chlorakas
- Number: 12

Senior career*
Years	Team	Apps	(Gls)
2013–2014	Tours B	8	(1)
2013–2014	Tours	11	(0)
2014–2015	Valenciennes	18	(0)
2015	Valenciennes B	5	(0)
2015–2016	Nîmes Olympique	7	(0)
2016	US Créteil	0	(0)
2016–2018	Panionios	35	(1)
2020–2021	Kalamata	4	(0)
2021–2022	PAO Rouf	23	(5)
2022–2023	Aiolikos	0	(0)
2023–2025	Omonia Aradippou	40	(0)
2025–	Akritas Chlorakas	13	(0)

International career^{‡}
2013–	Cameroon	12	(0)
- * Club domestic league appearances and goals as of 00:56, 9 May 2025 (UTC) ‡ National team caps and goals as of 05:12, 27 June 2020 (UTC)

Jérôme Guihoata (born 7 October 1994) is a Cameroonian professional footballer who plays as a centre back for Cypriot club Akritas Chlorakas.

== Club career ==
=== Panionios ===
In the summer of 2016, the Cameroonian central defender Jérôme Guihoata, who was recently released from US Créteil-Lusitanos, was on trial with the Greek Super League club Panionios, managed to impress club's manager Marinos Ouzounidis in training and he is expected to sign a two-season contract. On 9 December 2017, on the 82nd minute Guihoata scored his first goal with the club due to a mistake from Platanias goalie Antonis Kokkalas. The Greek goalie made a bad calculation in a foul run by Samed Yeşil, with Gioatta benefiting and scoring the second goal sealing a vital victory for the club.

== International career ==
Guihoata played his first international game with the senior national team on 10 August 2013 in and against Gabon (1–0), after he came on as a substitute for Julien Ebah in the 68th minute of that game. On 29 May 2017, Jérôme Guihoata was included for the first time in Cameroon's squad for Morocco on June 10 for the 2019 Africa Cup of Nations qualifiers and the Confederations Cup to be held from June 17 to July 2 in Russia. Cameroon will participate in the second group with Chile, Australia and Germany, representing Africa.
