= List of football stadiums in Libya =

Stadiums In Libya

The following is a list of football stadiums in Libya, with a capacity of at least 2,000 spectators. Some stadiums used for other purposes like athletics, concerts, politics and cultural events.

== Current stadiums ==
| # | Images | Stadium | Capacity | City | RF |
|---|---|---|---|---|---|
| 1 | | Tripoli Stadium | 50,000 | Tripoli | |
| 2 | | Benghazi International Stadium | 42,000 | Benghazi | |
| 3 | | Al Kremiah Stadium | 25,000 | Tripoli | |
| 4 | | Murbat Stadium | 21,442 | Misrata | |
| 5 | | Zaawia Stadium | 14,000 | Zawiya | |
| 6 | | Misurata Stadium | 10,000 | Misrata | |
| 7 | | Al Bayda Stadium | 10,000 | Bayda | |
| 8 | | Benina Martyrs Stadium | 10,000 | Benina | |
| 9 | | First Statement Stadium | 9,000 | Benghazi | |
| 10 | | Ajaylat Stadium | 8,000 | Ajaylat | |
| 11 | | GMR Stadium | 8,000 | Tripoli | |
| 12 | | Derna Stadium | 7,000 | Derna | |
| 13 | | Sheikh Chadae Stadium | 7,000 | Bayda | |
| 14 | | 7 October Stadium | 5,000 | Tripoli | |
| 15 | | Sirte Stadium | 2,000 | Sirte | |
| 16 | | Zuwara Stadium | 2,000 | Zuwarah | |

== Future stadiums ==
- Wadi Al Rabi Stadium Still under proposition

== See also ==
- List of African stadiums by capacity
- List of stadiums by capacity
- Lists of stadiums
- Football in Libya
