= 2018–19 Libyan Premier League =

Libyan Premier League
- Season: 2018–19
- Dates: 28 November 2018 – TBD 2019
- Champions: None (Cancelled)
- Relegated: None (Cancelled)
- Matches played: 88
- Goals scored: 151 (1.72 per match)
- Top goalscorer: Autemar; Moataz Al-Mehdi (4 goals)
- Biggest home win: Al-Ahly Benghazi 5–0 Al Ta'awon (31 December 2018)
- Biggest away win: Asswehly 0–3 Al-Ittihad (4 January 2019); Al-Ittihad 0–3 Abu Salem (15 January 2019)
- Highest scoring: Asswehly 4–2 Rafik (22 January 2019)
- Longest winning run: 4 matches Al-Akhdar; Asswehly
- Longest unbeaten run: 8 matches Al-Ahly Benghazi; Al-Madina
- Longest winless run: 8 matches Al-Mahalla; Aschat; Khaleej Sirte; Rafik
- Longest losing run: 7 matches Al-Anwar
- All statistics correct as of 3 March 2019.

The 2018–19 Libyan Premier League season was an abandoned season that was supposed to be the 48th since its establishment. The season has started on 28 November 2018. Fixtures of the 2018–19 were announced on 30 October 2018.

Al-Nasr were the defending champions. Al-Sadaqa and Abu Salem joined as the promoted clubs from the 2017–18 Libyan First Division. They replaced Qurdabia, Al-Andalus, Ascharara, Abi al Ashhar, Al-Tarsana and Annajma who were relegated to the 2018–19 Libyan First Division.

== Summary ==
Before the start of the season many disagreements took place which led to the postponement of the start of the season several times. The Competition Organising Committee in the Libyan Football Federation had chosen 14 September to be the date of starting the new season but, there were 4 clubs who demanded the postponement of the season. These clubs were Al-Nasr, Al-Ahly Benghazi, Al-Ahly Tripoli, Al-Madina. The reason behind this was that these clubs wanted to hold a meeting for the general assembly for discussing the problems that the previous season has faced and how to avoid them and solve the current . As a result of the clubs demands and the security situations, The Competition Committee delayed the start of the new season until 2 October but didn't hold the general assembly meeting. However, On 12 October the eastern group clubs were hosted in the headquarters of Darnes Club. The clubs made an agreement to refuse the start of the season until they get their demands from the Football Federation. Their demands were:

1. To delay the start of the season for at least 10 November
2. To get financial support from the Football Federation
3. To reduce the number of relegated clubs from each group from 3 to 2
4. To approve Derna Stadium as a match holding stadium in the next season

The Football Federation had accepted their demands except the 2nd point. On the other hand, All the western clubs (except Al-Ahly Tripoli and Al-Ittihad) also held a meeting in Al-Madina Club and they also have refused the start of the season until they get their demands which were to get financial support from the Football Federation but the last didn't approve their demands and delayed the season again due to problems and this time until 26 October. However, another club meeting was held between all the western clubs (except Al-Ittihad and Al-Ittihad Misurata) in Abu Salem Club headquarters where they agreed to not start the season until the removal of the president of the Libyan Football Federation Jamal Aljaafari. Meanwhile, the Competition Committee has held the draw of the league without the knowledge of the clubs and without any representative from them in the draw ceremonies and the draw wasn't held in the headquarters of the Football Federation in Tripoli but it was held in Misurata instead. The Competition Committee has also chosen 9 November as a date of starting the new season. However, because of the long postponement of the season which will have a negative effect on the club's especially those who will compete on continental level and will also affect the national team, the clubs Rafik and Asswehly have agreed to start the new season without any demands. The Competition Committee as usual delayed the season until 21 November to solve some problems. On the other hand the refusing clubs of the East and West which were: Abu Salem, Aschat, Al-Ahly Tripoli Al-Wahda, Al-Madina, Al-Hilal, Al-Mahalla, Shabaab al Jabal, Darnes and Al Ta'awon have organised a competition for the necessity of keeping their players in the form of games. The competition was under the name of Activator Competition for Libyan Premier League Clubs or Libya Tajma'ona (Libya brings us together). However, some refusing clubs like Al-Ahly Benghazi and Al-Nasr didn't participate in the competition because of their preparation for CAF Champions League preliminary round games as they were camping in Egypt. On 21 November the refusing clubs made a statement indicating their demand for holding the General Assembly meeting and their need for financial support. However, the league has already started and the first game was between Al-Ittihad and Aschat which saw the withdrawal of the latter because of their refusal to start the league before getting what they demanded in the statement. On 24 November, the Executive Office held a meeting to decide whether to keep or withdraw the trust from the LFF president Jamal Aljaafari by the majority of vote. The majority decided to withdraw trust from Jamal Aljaafari and he will be removed from his position temporarily until the New General Assembly meeting which was scheduled to be held on 8 December in Sirte until it was delayed to 20 December in Marj. However, The league will continue on its scheduled date. The executive office has appointed the former referee and vice president Abdulhakim Alshilmani as the new president for the Libyan Football Federation. 85 clubs representatives have attended the meeting with 82 clubs voting against Jamal Aljaafari, 2 clubs voting for him and 1 club refusing to vote. As a result, Jamal Aljaafari was removed permanently from his position as a president of the Libyan Football Federation.

The second round of matches in the second group featured the first Tripoli Derby of the season, which Al-Ittihad won 2–1 at Misurata Stadium against Al-Ahly Tripoli. The result put Al-Ahly into 12th place temporarily. Other early pace-setters included Al-Akhdar and Shabaab al Jabal who are currently the top two teams in the first group as of mid-February, Asswehly, Al-Madina and Abu Salem who are the second, third and fourth placed teams in the second group respectively as of the first week of February. The third round of matches in the first group featured the first "Benghazi Derby" of the season, which Al-Ahly Benghazi won 1-0 at Benina Stadium against Al-Nasr.

The season suffered delays several times. It was first delayed in mid-February so that the national team could hold a training camp in Tunisia in preparation for an important match against South Africa. It was delayed again a month later for the same reason.

Early in the season, the LFF announced that the season would continue during Ramadan at night. However, due to the 2019 Western Libya offensive, the LFF decided to suspend the league. Sources inside the LFF indicated that the season was close to being cancelled. However, the LFF decided to postpone the season until 15 June (though at this stage, many foreign coaches had fled the country and foreign players terminated their contracts).

15 June passed, and there was no sign of the league continuing. The LFF later decided to cancel the season and announced that Al-Ittihad will play in the 2019-20 CAF Confederation Cup and Al-Nasr will play in the 2019-20 CAF Champions League.

== Teams ==
=== Team changes ===
Promoted from 2017–18 Libyan First Division	Relegated from 2017–18 Libyan Premier League
Al Sadaqa; Abu Salem	Qurdabia; Al-Andalus; Ascharara; Abi al Ashhar; Al-Tarsana; Annajma

=== Groups ===
Due to the continued security situation in Libya in 2018 and the difficulty in air-travel for most teams, the participating teams were grouped by their geographical location into two groups of twelve teams. Teams from each group were scheduled to play every team from their group in a home-and-away round robin format with 3 points given for a win and 1 point for a draw.

	Team	Location
Group 1	Al-Ahly Benghazi	Benghazi
Group 1	Al Akhdar	Bayda
Group 1	Al-Anwar	Al-Abyar
Group 1	Al-Hilal	Benghazi
Group 1	Al-Nasr	Benghazi
Group 1	Al Sadaqa	Shahhat
Group 1	Al Ta'awon	Ajdabiya
Group 1	Al Tahaddy	Benghazi
Group 1	Nojom Ajdabiya	Ajdabiya
Group 1	Darnes	Derna
Group 1	Khaleej Sirte	Sirte
Group 1	Shabaab al Jabal	Shahhat
Group 2	Abu Salem	Tripoli
Group 2	Al-Ahli Tripoli	Tripoli
Group 2	Al-Ittihad	Tripoli
Group 2	Al-Ittihad Misurata	Misurata
Group 2	Al-Khums	Al-Khums
Group 2	Al-Madina	Tripoli
Group 2	Al-Mahalla	Tripoli
Group 2	Al-Wahda	Tripoli
Group 2	Aschat	Tripoli
Group 2	Asswehly	Misurata
Group 2	Olympic Azzaweya	Zawiya
Group 2	Rafik	Sorman

=== Stadia and Locations ===
Locations of the 2018–19 Libyan Premier League teams

Team	Location	Stadium	Capacity
Abu Salem	Tripoli	Tripoli Stadium	80,000
Al-Ahly Benghazi	Benghazi	Benina Stadium	10,550
Al-Ahly Tripoli	Tripoli	Tripoli Stadium	80,000
Al-Akhdar	Al-Bayda	Sheikh Chadae Stadium	10,000
Al-Anwar	Al-Abyar	Sheikh Chadae Stadium	10,000
Al-Hilal	Benghazi	Benina Stadium	10,550
Al-Ittihad	Tripoli	Tripoli Stadium	80,000
Al-Ittihad Misurata	Misurata	Misurata Stadium	10,000
Al-Khums	Al-Khums	Al-Khums Stadium	10,000
Al-Madina	Tripoli	Tripoli Stadium	80,000
Al-Mahalla	Tripoli	Tripoli Stadium	80,000
Al-Nasr	Benghazi	Benina Stadium	10,550
Al-Sadaqa	Shahhat	Shahhat Stadium	10,000
Al Ta'awon	Ajdabiya	Benina Stadium	10,550
Al-Tahaddy	Benghazi	Benina Stadium	10,550
Al-Wahda	Tripoli	Tripoli Stadium	80,000
Aschat	Tripoli	Tripoli Stadium	80,000
Asswehly	Misurata	Misurata Stadium	10,000
Darnes	Derna	Derna Stadium	7,000
Khaleej Sirte	Sirte	Sirte Stadium	2,000
Nojom Ajdabiya	Ajdabiya	Benina Stadium	10,550
Olympic Azzaweya	Zawiya	Zaawia Stadium	14,000
Rafik	Sorman	Om Al-Rabi Stadium	8,000
Shabaab al Jabal	Shahhat	Shahhat Stadium	10,000

=== Stadiums ===
The following stadiums were chosen by the Competitions Committee to be available to host league games.

Stadium	Location
Misurata Stadium	Misurata
Al-Khums Stadium	Al-Khums
Zliten Stadium	Zliten
Janzour Academy Stadium	Tripoli
Zaawia Stadium	Zawiya
Tarhuna Municipal Stadium	Tarhuna
Sorman Stadium	Sorman
Zuwarah Stadium	Zuwarah
Riqdalin Stadium	Riqdalin
Al-Jameel Stadium	Al-Jameel
Zintan Stadium	Zintan
Gharyan Stadium	Gharyan
Sabha Stadium	Sabha
Sirte Stadium	Sirte
Marj Stadium	Marj
Sheikh Chadae Stadium	Al-Bayda
Shahhat Stadium	Shahhat
Derna Stadium	Derna
Tobruk Stadium	Tobruk
Musaid Stadium	Musaid
Tripoli Stadium^{1}	Tripoli
Martyrs of Benina Stadium^{1}	Benghazi (Benina)

^{1} As per the decision of the Stadiums Assessments Committee of the Libyan Football Federation on 30 October 2018 these stadiums will not host matches until they are repaired. On 27 January, the Competition Committee announced the ability of these stadiums to host the league games again.

== First stage ==
=== Group 1 ===
==== Standings ====
Pos	Team	Pld	W	D	L	GF	GA	GD	Pts	Qualification or relegation
1	Al-Ahly Benghazi	11	7	4	0	17	6	+11	25	Qualification for Championship playoff
2	Al-Nasr	11	7	2	2	15	6	+9	23	Qualification for Championship playoff
3	Al-Akhdar	11	7	2	2	12	6	+6	23	
4	Al-Hilal	11	6	1	4	14	11	+3	19	
5	Al-Ta'awon	11	4	6	1	9	9	0	18	
6	Shabaab al Jabal	11	4	5	2	8	6	+2	17	
7	Al-Sadaqa	11	3	5	3	8	9	−1	14	
8	Nojoom Ajdabiya	11	3	2	6	12	18	−6	11	
9	Al-Tahaddy	11	2	4	5	6	8	−2	10	
10	Darnes	11	2	3	6	5	10	−5	9	
11	Khaleej Sirte	11	0	6	5	1	7	−6	6	Relegation to Libyan First Division
12	Al-Anwar	11	0	2	9	4	15	−11	2	Relegation to Libyan First Division

Updated to match(es) played on 6 April 2019. Source: kooora.com
Rules for classification: 1) Points; 2) Head-to-head points; 3) Head-to-head goal difference; 4) Head-to-head goals scored; 5) Head-to-head away goals scored; 6) Goal difference; 7) Goals scored; 8) Away Goals scored; 9) Play-off.

==== Positions by round ====
The table lists the positions of teams after each week of matches.
In order to preserve chronological evolvements, any postponed matches are not included to the round at which they were originally scheduled, but added to the full round they were played immediately afterwards.

Team ╲ Round	1	2	3	4	5	6	7	8	9	10	11	12	13	14
Al-Akhdar	1	1	1	1	1	1								
Al-Sadaqa	4	3	3	2	2	2								
Shabaab al Jabal	3	5	4	6	3	3								
Al-Ahly Benghazi	6	7	10	3	4	4								
Al-Nasr	7	8	11	7	7	5								
Al-Hilal	2	6	7	8	8	6								
Nojom Ajdabiya	5	2	5	4	5	7								
Al Ta'awon	8	4	2	5	6	8								
Al-Tahaddy	11	11	8	11	9	9								
Darnes	9	10	6	9	10	10								
Khaleej Sirte	12	12	9	10	11	11								
Al-Anwar	10	9	12	12	12	12								

Leader
Championship play-off
Relegation to First Division

==== Results ====
Home \ Away	AHB	ALAK	ALAN	ALH	ALN	ALS	ALTA	ALTH	DAR	KSI	NAJ	SAJ
Al-Ahly Benghazi	—	0–0			1–0		5–0	2–1	1–0			
Al Akhdar		—	1–0							1–0		2–1
Al-Anwar			—									0–1
Al-Hilal				—				1–0	2–1	1–0		
Al-Nasr			1–0		—		0–0		2–1	2–0		
Al-Sadaqa	1–1		1–0	1–0		—					2–2	
Al Ta'awon		0–0		2–0			—					1–1
Al-Tahaddy		0–1	1–0			1–1		—		0–0	1–2	
Darnes		0–1				0–1			—			
Khaleej Sirte						0–0	1–2			—	0–0	
Nojoom Ajdabiya									1–2		—	
Shabaab al Jabal	1–1			1–0	2–1					0–0		—

Updated to match(es) played on 2 March 2019. Source: Goalzz
Legend: Blue = home team win; Yellow = draw; Red = away team win.

=== Group 2 ===
==== Standings ====
Pos	Team	Pld	W	D	L	GF	GA	GD	Pts	Qualification or relegation
1	Al-Ittihad	10	7	1	2	16	5	+11	22	Qualification for Championship playoff
2	Asswehly	8	6	0	2	16	11	+5	18	Qualification for Championship playoff
3	Al-Ahly Tripoli	10	5	3	2	14	9	+5	18	
4	Al-Madina	8	4	4	0	8	3	+5	16	
5	Al-Wahda	10	4	3	3	7	7	0	15	
6	Abu Salem	9	2	6	1	5	2	+3	12	
7	Al-Khums	10	3	3	4	4	7	−3	12	
8	Al-Ittihad Misurata	9	2	4	3	11	9	+2	10	
9	Olympic Azzawea	10	2	4	4	10	11	−1	10	
10	Aschat	10	0	6	4	2	10	−8	6	
11	Al-Mahalla	10	0	6	4	1	9	−8	6	Relegation to Libyan First Division
12	Rafik	10	0	4	6	5	16	−11	4	Relegation to Libyan First Division

Updated to match(es) played on 4 April 2019. Source: kooora.com
Rules for classification: 1) Points; 2) Head-to-head points; 3) Head-to-head goal difference; 4) Head-to-head goals scored; 5) Head-to-head away goals scored; 6) Goal difference; 7) Goals scored; 8) Away Goals scored; 9) Play-off.

==== Positions by round ====
The table lists the positions of teams after each week of matches.
In order to preserve chronological evolvements, any postponed matches are not included to the round at which they were originally scheduled, but added to the full round they were played immediately afterwards.

Team ╲ Round	1	2	3	4	5	6	7	8	9	10	11	12	13	14	15	16	17	18	19	20	21	22
Asswehly	2	1	2	2	2	2	1	1														
Al-Madina	3	3	3	3	3	3	3	2														
Al-Ittihad	6	5	6	1	1	1	2	3														
Al-Ahly Tripoli	5	12	12	8	8	4	4	4														
Al-Wahda	4	4	1	5	5	6	5	5														
Abu Salem	11	9	5	4	4	5	6	6														
Al-Ittihad Misurata	1	2	4	7	7	8	8	7														
Al-Khums	7	6	7	6	6	7	7	8														
Olympic Azzaweya	9	7	11	11	10	12	12	9														
Aschat	8	10	9	9	9	10	10	10														
Rafik	10	8	8	12	12	9	9	11														
Al-Mahalla	12	11	10	10	11	11	11	12														

Leader
Championship play-off
Relegation to First Division

==== Results ====
Home \ Away	ABS	AHT	ALI	ALIM	ALK	ALMD	ALMH	ALW	ASH	ASW	OAZ	RAF
Abu Salem	—			0–0	1–0		0–0		0–0		0–0	
Al-Ahly Tripoli		—		3–2	0–1	0–0	1–0			3–2		
Al-Ittihad	0–3	2–1	—			0–1			3–0			
Al-Ittihad Misurata				—	2–0		4–0			0–1	2–2	
Al-Khums			0–0		—			1–0				
Al-Madina					2–1	—						
Al-Mahalla						0–0	—	0–1				
Al-Wahda	1–0		0–2	1–1		0–0		—			2–0	
Aschat		1–3		0–0			0–0		—			0–0
Asswehly			0–3		2–0		2–0		2–1	—	3–2	4–2
Olympic Azzawea			0–1		0–0						—	3–0
Rafik	1–1	0–0				1–2	1–1					—

Updated to match(es) played on 3 March 2019. Source: Goalzz
Legend: Blue = home team win; Yellow = draw; Red = away team win.

== Season statistics ==
=== Scoring ===
- First goal of the season:
  (Libya) Ashour Shaglof for Al-Sadaqa against Nojom Ajdabiya (28 November 2018)

=== Top goalscorers ===
As of 2 February 2019

Rank	Player	Club	Goals
1	(Brazil) Autemar	Asswehly	4
1	(Libya) Moataz Al-Mehdi	Al-Nasr	4
3	(Libya) Alshamakh Gaddafi	Al Ta'awon	3
3	(Libya) Jebrel Mersal	Al-Ahly Benghazi	3
3	(Libya) Salem Roma	Al-Ittihad	3
3	(Libya) Elmutasem Abushnaf	Al-Madina	3
7	(Libya) Ashour Shaglouf	Al-Sadaqa	2
7	(Libya) Ahmed Al-Kadiri	Al-Ittihad Misurata	2
7	(Libya) Abdulraheem Al-Amari	Nojom Ajdabiya	2
7	(Libya) Mohammed Alghaneme	Al-Wahda	2
7	(Libya) Naji Shweqi	Nojom Ajdabiya	2
7	(Libya) Abdullah Al-Eirfe	Al-Ahly Benghazi	2

=== Hat-tricks ===
Player	For	Against	Result	Date	Round
(Libya) Jebril Mersal	Al-Ahly Benghazi	Al Ta'awon	5-0 (H)	31 December 2018	1

Note

(H) – Home; (A) – Away

== Number of teams by City ==
Number of teams	City	Team(s)
7	Tripoli	Abu Salem, Al-Ahly Tripoli, Al-Ittihad, Al-Madina, Al-Mahalla, Al-Wahda and Aschat
4	Benghazi	Al-Ahly Benghazi, Al-Hilal, Al-Nasr and Al-Tahaddy
2	Ajdabiya	Al Ta'awon and Nojom Ajdabiya
2	Misurata	Asswehly and Al-Ittihad Misurata
2	Shahhat	Al-Sadaqa and Shabaab al Jabal
1	Al-Abyar	Al-Anwar
1	Al-Khums	Al-Khums
1	Bayda	Al-Akhdar
1	Derna	Darnes
1	Sirte	Khaleej Sirte
1	Sorman	Rafik
1	Zawiya	Olympic Azzaweya
