= 2008–09 Libyan Trophy =

Association football tournament

The 2008-09 Libyan Trophy, known as the Libyana Cup for sponsorship reasons, was contested between the sixteen sides playing in the 2008-09 Libyan Premier League. It is the second edition of the competition.

== Rules ==
This is a competition aimed at under-21 players. However, each club is permitted to enter three members of its senior side, as long as they are not foreign players. The 16 clubs will be split into three groups, depending on their geographic location. The sides in each group will play each other once. The winner of each group will enter a Championship Group. The three sides in this group will play each other home and away to determine the title.

=== Prizes ===
- Winner - LYD 100,000
- 2nd Place - LYD 50,000
- 3rd Place- LYD 25,000

== Draw ==
The draw was made by the Libyan Football Federation on Wednesday, February 25, 2009, in Benghazi. The 16 sides in the Libyan Premier League for the 2008-09 season were drawn into three groups, two of 5 and one group of 6. They were sorted according to geographic location.

=== Group A (Eastern Section) ===
Team	Pld	W	D	L	GF	GA	GD	Pts
Khaleej Sirte	4	2	2	0	3	1	2	8
Al Hilal	4	2	1	1	4	5	-1	7
Al Akhdar	4	1	2	1	4	4	0	5
Al Ahly Benghazi	4	1	1	2	6	6	0	4
Al Nasr	4	1	0	3	5	6	-1	3

==== Fixtures ====
Week 1

March 6, 2009
15:30

Al Hilal	0 – 0	Khaleej Sirte

First Statement Stadium
Referee: Ahmed al Jroushi

March 9, 2009
15:30

Al Ahly Benghazi	1 – 1	Al Akhdar
al Houta 55'		Boukteaf 62'

First Statement Stadium
Referee: Mohammad Shuaib

Week 2

March 15, 2009
16:00

Al Nasr	1 – 2	Al Hilal

GMR Stadium
Referee: Snousi Belqasim
March 19, 2009
16:00

Khaleej Sirte	2 – 1	Al Ahly Benghazi

2 March Stadium
Referee: Walid al Tijani

Week 3

March 23, 2009
15:30

Al Ahly Benghazi	3 – 1	Al Nasr

Martyrs of February Stadium
March 24, 2009
15:30

Al Akhdar	0 – 0	Khaleej Sirte

Al Bayda Stadium

Week 4

April 6, 2009
16:00

Al Hilal	2 – 1	Al Ahly Benghazi

First Statement Stadium
April 7, 2009
16:00

Al Nasr	3 – 0	Al Akhdar

First Statement Stadium

Week 5

April 13, 2009
16:00

Al Akhdar	3 – 0	Al Hilal

Al Bayda Stadium
April 13, 2009
16:00

Khaleej Sirte	1 – 0	Al Nasr

2 March Stadium

=== Group B (Western Section A) ===
Team	Pld	W	D	L	GF	GA	GD	Pts
Al Madina	1	1	0	0	4	2	+2	3
Al Tersana	1	1	0	0	2	1	+1	3
Al Jazeera	0	0	0	0	0	0	0	0
Al Ittihad	0	0	0	0	0	0	0	0
Wefaq Sabratha	1	0	0	1	1	2	-1	0
Al Wahda	1	0	0	1	2	4	-2	0

==== Fixtures ====
Week 1

March 6, 2009
15:30

Wefaq Sabratha	1 – 2	Al Tersana
(2H)		al Bhairy; Mohamed Ar'arah

Sabratha Stadium
Referee: Hassan al Mounir
March 6, 2009
18:00

Al Madina	4 – 2	Al Wahda
al Amary (1H) al Swea'y (1H) 48' bin Dallah 79'		Abu Shnaaf 51' 73'

GMR Stadium
Referee: Abdallah al Jerbi

March 9, 2009
16:00

Al Ittihad	5 - 1	Al Jazeera
Amer 15' al Haasy 35' (pen.); 57' (pen.); Araiby 69'; Krawa'a 86'		43'

GMR Stadium
Referee: Khalid Abu Sitta

Week 2

March 15, 2009
16:00

Al Ittihad	3 – 1	Al Wahda

GMR Stadium
Referee: Ahmad Jalloul
March 16, 2009
16:00

Al Madina	2 – 0	Wefaq Sabratha

GMR Stadium
Referee: Ismail Mabrouk
March 16, 2009
16:00

Al Jazeera	0 – 0	Al Tersanah

Zuwara Stadium
Referee: Majdi al Zwaghi

--- Week 3

March 23, 2009
15:30

–

Tersana vs. Madina
Ittihad vs. Wefaq

Week 4
Jazeera vs. Madina
Wahda vs. Wefaq
Tersana vs. Ittihad

Week 5
Jazeera vs. Wefaq
Madina vs. Ittihad
Wahda vs. Tersana

=== Group C (Western Section B) ===
Team	Pld	W	D	L	GF	GA	GD	Pts
Al Sweahly	1	1	0	0	1	0	+1	3
Al Olomby	0	0	0	0	0	0	0	0
Al Ahly Tripoli	0	0	0	0	0	0	0	0
Aman al Aam	0	0	0	0	0	0	0	0
Al Shat	1	0	0	1	0	1	-1	0

Week 1

March 5, 2009
16:00

Al Shat	0 – 1	Al Sweahly
		al Ghuwail 25'

GMR Stadium
Referee: Lutfi al Mabrouk

March 9, 2009
15:30

Al Olomby	1 – 2	Al Ahly Tripoli
Khalifa Qarira 71'		Mohammad Salah-al-Din 83' 88'

Zaawia Stadium
Referee: Abdelrahman al Hraizy

Week 2
Aman al Aam vs. Ahly Tripoli
Sweahly vs. Olomby

Week 3
Shat vs. Olomby
Aman al Aam vs. Sweahly

Week 4
Ahly Tripoli vs. Sweahly
Shat vs. Aman al Aam

Week 5
Olomby vs. Aman al Aam
Ahly Tripoli vs. Shat

== Final stage ==
Khaleej Sirte, Aman al Aam and Ittihad Tripoli qualified from the groups

=== Fixtures & Results ===
- 13-07-09 : Ittihad 3 - 1 Khaleej Sirte
- 16-07-09 : Khaleej Sirte 1 - 3 Aman al Aam
- 19-07-09 : Aman al Aam 0 - 1 Ittihad
- 23-07-09 : Khaleej Sirte 3 - 2 Ittihad
- 26-07-09 : Aman al Aam 2 - 0 Khaleej Sirte
- 29-07-09 : Ittihad 5 - 0 Aman al Aam

1.Ittihad		 4  3  0  1  11 -  4  9  Champions
2.Aman al Aam	         4  2  0  2   5 -  7  6
3.Khaleej Strt          4  1  0  3   5 - 10  3
