= 2022–23 Libyan Premier League =

Libyan Premier League
- Season: 2022–23
- Dates: 19 October 2022 - 13 July 2023
- Champions: Al Ahli SC (Tripoli)
- 2023–24 CAF Champions League: Al Ahli SC (Tripoli); Al-Ahly SC (Benghazi)
- Top goalscorer: Ahmed Krawa'a (18 goals)
- Biggest home win: Alittihad Misurata 6-1 Asarya (9 June 2023)
- Biggest away win: Almahalla 0–3 Olympic Azzaweya (10 December 2022)
- Highest scoring: Al Ahli 6-3 Al-Madina (5 June 2023)
- Longest unbeaten run: Al Ahli SC (Tripoli) 19 matches
- All statistics correct as of 18 July 2023.

The 2022–23 Libyan Premier League season was the 48th edition of the competition.

The league was split into two regional groups, with the top three teams from each group participating in a six-team championship stage which was held in Tunisia. Al-Ahly Tripoli won the title after leading the championship after four rounds. Ittihad refused to play the final match against Al-Ahly, causing runners-up Benghazi to fail to show to their final round match as well.

Al-Ittihad were the defending champions, but finished last in the six-team championship round.

The first round of matches in the second half of the season featured several no-shows, causing several points deductions and a voided match.

Libyan top-flight league matches have generally been held in front of very small crowds due to restrictions between 2011 and 2023.

== Teams ==
=== Team changes ===
Promoted from 2021–22 Libyan First Division	Relegated from 2021–22 Libyan Premier League
Al-Suqoor; Asarya	Aschat SC; Khaleej Sirte

=== Groups ===
Group 1

Team	Location	Sha'biyah	Stadium	Capacity
Al-Ahly	Benghazi	Benghazi	Martyrs of February Stadium	10,550
Al-Hilal	Benghazi	Benghazi	Martyrs of February Stadium	10,550
Al-Sadaqa	Shahhat	Shahhat	Shahhat Stadium	10,000
Al-Ta'awon	Ajdabya	Ajdabya	10 June Stadium	10,550
Al-Akhdar	Bayda	Bayda	Sheikh Chadae Stadium	10,000
Al-Nasr	Benghazi	Benghazi	Martyrs of February Stadium	10,550
Al-Suqoor	Tobruk	Tobruk	Tobruk Stadium	8,000
Al-Tahaddy	Benghazi	Benghazi	Martyrs of February Stadium	10,550
Darnes	Derna	Derna	Derna Stadium	10,000
Shabaab Al-Jabal	Shahhat	Shahhat	Sheikh Chadae Stadium	10,000

Group 2

Team	Location	Stadium	Capacity
Abu Salem SC	Abu Salem	Abu Salem Stadium	
Al-Ahli	Tripoli	Jumayl Stadium	
Al-Ittihad	Tripoli	Abu Salem Stadium	
Al-Khums	Al Khums	Al-Khums Stadium	
Al-Madina	Tripoli	Jumayl Stadium	
Al-Ittihad Misurata	Misurata	Misurata Stadium	16,000
Al-Mahalla	Tripoli	Abu Salem Stadium	
Asarya	Zawiya	Zaawia Stadium	8,000
Asswehly	Misurata	Misurata Stadium	10,000
Olympic Azzaweya	Zawiya	Zaawia Stadium	8,000

== Format ==
The competition featured 20 clubs split into two regional groups: Group A (East) and Group B (West). Each team played home and away matches within their group. The top three teams from each group advanced to a championship round, which was held in Tunisia, to determine the champion and CAF competition qualifications.

== Teams ==
=== Group A (East) ===
- Al-Ahly
- Al-Hilal
- Al-Sadaqa
- Al-Ta'awon
- Al-Akhdar
- Al-Nasr
- Al-Suqoor
- Al-Tahaddy
- Darnes
- Shabaab Al-Jabal

=== Group B (West) ===
- Abu Salim
- Al-Ahli Tripoli
- Al-Ittihad
- Al-Khums
- Al-Madina
- Al-Ittihad Misurata
- Al-Mahalla
- Asarya
- Asswehly
- Olympic Azzaweya

== Group Stage Standings ==
=== Group A ===
Group A Table
Pos	Team	Pld	W	D	L	GF	GA	GD	Pts
1	Al-Ahly	18	8	9	1	26	16	+10	33
2	Al-Nasr	18	7	9	2	20	15	+5	30
3	Al-Hilal	18	8	5	5	23	16	+7	29
4	Al-Akhdar	18	7	5	6	23	19	+4	26
5	Al-Tahaddy	18	6	6	6	18	18	0	24
6	Al-Sadaqa	18	5	6	7	17	20	-3	21
7	Al-Ta'awon	18	4	7	7	15	22	-7	19
8	Darnes	18	4	6	8	14	21	-7	18
9	Shabaab Al-Jabal	18	3	6	9	12	24	-12	15
10	Al-Suqoor	18	2	5	11	10	25	-15	11

=== Group B ===
Group B Table
Pos	Team	Pld	W	D	L	GF	GA	GD	Pts
1	Al-Ittihad	18	11	5	2	28	6	+22	38
2	Al Ahli Tripoli	18	8	8	2	24	11	+13	32
3	Abu Salim	18	8	8	2	16	8	+8	32
4	Olympic Azzaweya	18	7	6	5	20	15	+5	27
5	Asswehly	18	6	7	5	18	17	+1	25
6	Al-Madina	18	5	6	7	15	18	-3	21
7	Al-Mahalla	18	4	7	7	14	19	-5	19
8	Al-Khums	18	4	6	8	13	20	-7	18
9	Al-Ittihad Misurata	18	3	7	8	12	22	-10	16
10	Asarya	18	2	4	12	10	30	-20	10

== Championship Round ==
The top three teams from each group advanced to the championship round held in Tunisia.

=== Final Table ===
Championship Round
Pos	Team	Pld	W	D	L	GF	GA	GD	Pts
1	Al-Ahli	5	4	1	0	10	2	+8	13
2	Al-Ahly	5	3	0	2	6	7	-1	9
3	Al-Hilal	5	1	3	1	3	3	0	6
4	Abu-Salim	5	1	2	2	5	7	-2	5
5	Al-Nasr	5	1	1	3	4	6	-2	4
6	Al-Ittihad	5	0	3	2	4	7	-3	3

== See also ==
- Libyan Premier League
- Libyan Football Federation
