= Libya national football team results (2020–present) =

This article provides details of international football games played by the Libya national team from 2020 to present.

== Results ==
Key
Win
Draw
Defeat

=== 2020 ===
11 October 2020 Friendly	Libya	1–2	Comoros	Tunis, Tunisia
15:00 UTC+1	Soilihi 45' (o.g.)	Report	Djoudja 71'; M'Changama 90+1'	Stadium: Stade El Menzah; Referee: Mehrez Malki (Tunisia)

11 November 2020 2021 AFCON Q	Libya	2–3	Equatorial Guinea	Cairo, Egypt
21:00 UTC+2	Al Warfali 55' (pen.); Bettamer 58'	Report	Machín 33'; Obiang 90+1'; Obama 90+4'	Stadium: Al Ahly Stadium; Referee: Bakary Gassama (Gambia)

15 November 2020 2021 AFCON Q	Equatorial Guinea	1–0	Libya	Bata, Equatorial Guinea
20:00 UTC+1	Salvador 27'	Report		Stadium: Estadio de Bata; Referee: Norman Matemera (Zimbabwe)

=== 2021 ===
25 March 2021 2021 AFCON Q	Libya	2–5	Tunisia	Benghazi, Libya
21:00 UTC+2	Ellafi 21', 54'	Report	Skhiri 39'; Jaziri 48', 90+3'; Dräger 51'; Ben Slimane 84'	Stadium: Martyrs of February Stadium; Referee: Daouda Guèye (Senegal)

28 March 2021 2021 AFCON Q	Tanzania	1–0	Libya	Dar es Salaam, Tanzania
16:00 UTC+3	Msuva 45+2'	Report		Stadium: National Stadium; Referee: Hassan Mohamed Hagi (Somalia)

14 June 2021 Friendly	Libya	0–1	Liberia	Tunis, Tunisia
16:30 UTC+1		Report	Dorley 45' (pen.)	Stadium: Stade Chedly Zouiten; Referee: Youssef Essrairi (Tunisia)

19 June 2021 2021 FIFA Arab Cup	Libya	0–1	Sudan	Doha, Qatar
20:00 UTC+3		Report	Abdel Rahman 15' (pen.)	Stadium: Khalifa International Stadium; Referee: Saoud Ali Al-Adba (Qatar)

27 August 2021 Unofficial Friendly	Libya	3–2	Iraq U23	İzmit, Turkey
10:00 UTC+3

1 September 2021 2022 World Cup qualification	Libya	2–1	Gabon	Benghazi, Libya
21:00 UTC+2	Salama 27'; Al Warfali 90+5'	Report	Poko 11'	Stadium: Martyrs of February Stadium; Referee: Bamlak Tessema Weyesa (Ethiopia)

7 September 2021 2022 World Cup qualification	Angola	0–1	Libya	Luanda, Angola
20:00 UTC+1		Report	Al Khouja 43'	Stadium: Estádio 11 de Novembro; Referee: Messie Nkounkou (Congo)

8 October 2021 2022 World Cup qualification	Egypt	1–0	Libya	Alexandria, Egypt
21:00 UTC+2	Marmoush 49'; Hamed (yellow card) 86'	Report		Stadium: Borg El Arab Stadium; Referee: Pacifique Ndabihawenimana (Burundi)

11 October 2021 2022 World Cup qualification	Libya	0–3	Egypt	Benghazi, Libya
21:00 UTC+2		Report	Abou El Fotouh 39'; Mostafa 45+4'; Sobhi 72'	Stadium: Benina Martyrs Stadium; Referee: Victor Gomes (South Africa)

12 November 2021 2022 World Cup qualification	Gabon	1–0	Libya	Franceville, Gabon
14:00 UTC+1	Aubameyang 54' (pen.)	Report		Stadium: Stade de Franceville; Referee: Mashood Ssali (Uganda)

16 November 2021 2022 World Cup qualification	Libya	1–1	Angola	Benghazi, Libya
15:00 UTC+2	Al Warfali 49' (pen.)	Report	Zini 81'	Stadium: 28 March Stadium; Referee: Beida Dahane (Mauritania)

=== 2022 ===
29 January 2022 Friendly	Kuwait	2–0	Libya	Kuwait City, Kuwait
19:30 UTC+3	Al-Faneeni 8'; Al-Khaldi 48'	Report		Stadium: Jaber Al-Ahmad International Stadium

1 February 2022 Friendly	Kuwait	0–2	Libya	Kuwait City, Kuwait
17:55 UTC+3		Report	Al Khoja 25'; Salama 90+1'	Stadium: Jaber Al-Ahmad International Stadium

26 March 2022 Friendly	Libya	2–1	Niger	Nouakchott, Mauritania
17:00	Soulah 21'; Ellafi 88' (pen.)	Report	Adebayor 90+2' (pen.)	Stadium: Stade Cheikha Ould Boïdiya; Referee: Abdel Aziz Mohamed Bouh (Mauritania)

29 March 2022 Friendly	Mauritania	2–0	Libya	Nouakchott, Mauritania
21:00	Kamara 39' (pen.); Tanjy 59' (pen.)	Report		Stadium: Stade Cheikha Ould Boïdiya; Referee: Mehrez Melki (Tunisia)

1 June 2022 2023 AFCON Q	Libya	1–0	Botswana	Benina, Libya
18:00 UTC+2	Al Taher 54'	Report		Stadium: Martyrs of February Stadium; Referee: Sekou Ahmed Toure (Guinea)

6 June 2022 2023 AFCON Q	Equatorial Guinea	2–0	Libya	Malabo, Equatorial Guinea
20:00 UTC+1	Al Tuhami 51' (o.g.); Bikoro 83' (pen.)	Report		Stadium: Estadio de Malabo; Referee: Blaise Yuven Ngwa (Cameroon)

21 September 2022 Friendly	Libya	0–0	Uganda	Benina, Libya
19:00 UTC+2		Report		Stadium: Martyrs of February Stadium; Referee: Mehrez Melki (Tunisia)

27 September 2022 Friendly	Libya	2–1	Tanzania	Benina, Libya
19:00 UTC+2		Report		Stadium: Martyrs of February Stadium

17 November 2022 Friendly	Niger	2–3	Libya	Antalya, Turkey
15:00 UTC+3		Report		Stadium: Zeytinköy 1 Nolu Saha

=== 2023 ===
24 March 2023 2023 AFCON Q	Tunisia	3–0	Libya	Stade Hammadi Agrebi, Tunis
21:30 UTC+1	Msakni 12'; Maâloul 21' (pen.); Jouini 86'	Report		Referee: Mustapha Ghorbal (Algeria)

28 March 2023 2023 AFCON Q	Libya	0–1	Tunisia	Benina Martyrs Stadium, Benghazi
22:00 UTC+2		Report	Jouini 16'	Referee: Amin Omar (Egypt)

17 June 2023 2023 AFCON Q	Botswana	1–0	Libya	Obed Itani Chilume Stadium, Francistown
18:00 UTC+2	Mohutsiwa 45'	Report		Referee: Samuel Uwikunda (Rwanda)

17 October Friendly	Libya	1–1	Niger	Khouribga, Morocco
16:30 UTC+1	El Ghadi 59'	Report	Sabo 75'	Stadium: Phosphate Stadium; Referee: Mustapha Kechaf (Morocco)

19 October Friendly	Somalia	0–0	Libya	Khouribga, Morocco
19:00 UTC+1		Report		Stadium: Phosphate Stadium

11 November Friendly	Libya	2–1	Sudan	Benina, Libya
18:00 UTC+2	Al Badri 16'; Al Khouja 70'	Report		Stadium: Martyrs of February Stadium; Attendance: 0

17 November 2026 World Cup qualification	Eswatini	0–1	Libya	Mbombela, South Africa
15:00 UTC+2		Report	Krawa’a 53'	Stadium: Mbombela Stadium; Attendance: 200; Referee: Omar Artan (Somalia)

21 November 2026 World Cup qualification	Libya	1–1	Cameroon	Benina, Libya
18:00 UTC+2	Aleiyan 43'	Report	Ntcham 34' (pen.)	Stadium: Benina Martyrs Stadium; Attendance: 13,450; Referee: Adissa Abdul Raphiou Ligali (Benin)

=== 2024 ===
2 January Friendly	Indonesia	0–4	Libya	Antalya, Turkey
15:00 UTC+3		Report	Krawa'a 25'; Al Khouja 58'; Al-Qulaib 89'; Al Qajdar 90+2'	Stadium: Mardan Sports Complex; Referee: Bahattin Şimşek (Turkey)

5 January Friendly	Libya	2–1	Indonesia	Antalya, Turkey
15:00 UTC+3	Al-Shuraimi 9'; Krawa'a 20'	Report	Yakob 6'	Stadium: Mardan Sports Complex; Referee: Kadir Sağlam (Turkey)

12 January Friendly	Libya	3–1	Kuwait	Cairo, Egypt
18:00 UTC+2	Al Khouja 30', 20'; A. Saleh 90'	Report	Zayid 78'	Stadium: Cairo International Stadium

22 March Friendly	Libya	2–1	Burkina Faso	Casablanca, Morocco
22:00 UTC+1	Al Badri 35'; Al Khouja 62'	Report	Bouda 37'	Stadium: Père Jégo Stadium; Referee: Karim Sabry (Morocco)

26 March Friendly	Togo	1–1	Libya	Casablanca, Morocco
22:00 UTC+1	Tchakei 39'	Report	Krawa'a 37'	Stadium: Père Jégo Stadium

6 June 2026 World Cup qualification	Libya	2–1	Mauritius	Benghazi, Libya
18:00 UTC+2		Report		Stadium: Martyrs of February Stadium

11 June 2026 World Cup qualification	Cape Verde	1–0	Libya	Praia, Cape Verde
15:00 UTC−1		Report		Stadium: Estádio Nacional de Cabo Verde

31 August Friendly	Libya	1–0	Botswana	Tripoli, Libya
18:00 UTC+2	Krawa'a 54' (pen.)	Report		Stadium: Tripoli Stadium

4 September 2025 AFCON qualification	Libya	1–1	Rwanda	Tripoli, Libya
18:00 UTC+2	Al-Dhawi 16'	Report	Nshuti 47'	Stadium: Tripoli Stadium; Referee: Imtehaz Heeralall (Mauritius)

10 September 2025 AFCON qualification	Benin	2–1	Libya	Abidjan, Ivory Coast
19:00 UTC+0	Mounié 50'; Olaitan 62' (pen.)	Report	Al Badri 9' (pen.)	Stadium: Felix Houphouet Boigny Stadium; Referee: Abdel Aziz Bouh (Mauritania)

11 October 2025 AFCON qualification	Nigeria	1–0	Libya	Uyo, Nigeria
17:00 UTC+1	Dele-Bashiru 86'	Report		Stadium: Godswill Akpabio International Stadium; Referee: Godfrey Nkhakananga (Malawi)

15 October 2025 AFCON qualification	Libya	0–3; Awarded (Note: The Libya v Nigeria match, originally scheduled for 15 October 2024, was cancelled after the Nigerian team was allegedly left stranded at Al Abraq International Airport for more than 12 hours upon arrival, two days before the match. This led the Nigeria Football Federation to refuse to play and send their team back home. CAF later confirmed that the match would not take place and stated that a decision regarding its outcome would be made. On 26 October, CAF announced that Nigeria were awarded a 3–0 walkover win, and applied fines against Libya.)	Nigeria	Benghazi, Libya
21:00 UTC+2				Stadium: Martyrs of February Stadium
Note: The Libya v Nigeria match, originally scheduled for 15 October 2024, was cancelled after the Nigerian team was allegedly left stranded at Al Abraq International Airport for more than 12 hours upon arrival, two days before the match. This led the Nigeria Football Federation to refuse to play and send their team back home. CAF later confirmed that the match would not take place and stated that a decision regarding its outcome would be made.

14 November 2025 AFCON qualification	Rwanda	0–1	Libya	Kigali, Rwanda
17:00 UTC+2		Report	Saad Mohamed 84'	Stadium: Amahoro Stadium

18 November 2025 AFCON qualification	Libya	0–0	Benin	Tripoli, Libya
18:00 UTC+2		Report		Stadium: Tripoli Stadium

=== 2025 ===
20 March 2026 World Cup qualification	Libya	1–1	Angola	Benghazi, Libya
21:00 UTC+2	Ellafi 74'	Report (FIFA); Report (CAF)	Fredy 90+3'	Stadium: Benina Martyrs Stadium; Referee: Lamin Jammeh (Gambia)

25 March 2026 World Cup qualification	Cameroon	3–1	Libya	Yaoundé, Cameroon
20:00 UTC+1		Report (FIFA); Report (CAF)		Stadium: Ahmadou Ahidjo Stadium

4 September 2026 World Cup qualification	Angola	0–1	Libya	Luanda, Angola
17:00 UTC+1		Report (FIFA); Report (CAF)	El Maremi 48'	Stadium: Estádio 11 de Novembro; Referee: Pierre Jean Nguiene (Congo)

8 September 2026 World Cup qualification	Libya	2–0	Eswatini	Benghazi, Libya
21:00 UTC+2	Eisay 8'; El Maremi 19'	Report (FIFA); Report (CAF)		Stadium: Benghazi International Stadium; Referee: Adalbert Diouf (Senegal)

8 October 2026 World Cup qualification	Libya	3–3	Cape Verde	Tripoli, Libya
15:00 UTC+2	Pico 1' (o.g.); El Maremi 42'; Al-Shalui 58'	Report	Arcanjo 29'; Cabral 76'; W. Semedo 82'	Stadium: Tripoli Stadium; Referee: Mahmood Ali Mahmood Ismail (Sudan)

13 October 2026 World Cup qualification	Mauritius	0–0	Libya	Saint Pierre, Mauritius
20:00 UTC+4		Report		Stadium: Côte d'Or National Sports Complex; Referee: Yannick Malala Kabanga (DR Congo)

15 November Friendly	Libya	1–0	Mauritania	Benina, Libya
16:00 UTC+2	Mahmoud Al-Shalwi 31'	Report		Stadium: Benina Martyrs Stadium

25 November 2025 Arab Cup qualifiers	Palestine	0–0 (4–3 p)	Libya	Al Rayyan, Qatar
19:00 UTC+3		Report		Stadium: Al Gharafa Stadium; Referee: Mario Escobar (Guatemala)
	Penalties
	Dabagh (penalty scored); Hemdan (penalty scored); Saleh (penalty scored); Termanini (penalty missed); Mahajna (penalty scored)		(penalty missed) Yusuf; (penalty scored) Ali; (penalty scored) Taqtaq; (penalty scored) Tajouri; (penalty missed) Al Hbeishi

=== 2026 ===
27 March Friendly	Libya	0–0	Niger	Casablanca, Morocco
19:00 UTC+1		Report		Stadium: Larbi Zaouli Stadium; Referee: Mustapha Kech Chaf (Morocco)

31 March Friendly	Liberia	2–2	Libya	Casablanca, Morocco
16:00 UTC+1	Dorley 76'; P. Balde 82'	Report	El Maremi 44'; Al-Musrati 45+1'	Stadium: Larbi Zaouli Stadium; Referee: Hamza El Fariq (Morocco)
