= Mani Sapol =

Togolese footballer

Personal information
- Full name: Mani Sapol
- Date of birth: 5 June 1991 (age 35)
- Place of birth: Lomé, Togo
- Height: 1.70 m (5 ft 7 in)
- Position: Midfielder

Team information
- Current team: Dynamic Togolais

Youth career
- 2004–2006: Maranatha FC

Senior career*
Years	Team	Apps	(Gls)
2007	Maranatha FC		
2007–2011	Al-Ittihad SCSC		
2012–2013	CA Batna	32	(1)
2015–2016	Dacia Chișinău	26	(0)
2017–	Dynamic Togolais		

International career^{‡}
2006–2007	Togo U-17	6	(1)
2008–2013	Togo	13	(2)
- * Club domestic league appearances and goals as of 24 December 2016 ‡ National team caps and goals as of 14 June 2013

Mani Sapol (Arabic: سابول ماني; born 5 June 1991) is a Togolese football midfielder currently playing for Dynamic Togolais.

== Career ==
=== Club ===
In 2007 Sapol was voted by the English magazine World Soccer as the 30th "Most Exciting Teen Footballer" in 2007.

Sapol began his career in the youth from Maranatha FC, before in 2007 transferred to Maranatha F.C., a Fiokpo based club, there he played for two years before being sold to Al-Ittihad from Tripoli.

On 2 January 2012 Sapol signed for Algerian club CA Batna. On 28 January 2012 he made his debut for the club as a starter in a league game against MC Saïda.

In April 2015, after nearly two years without a club, Sapol signed for FC Dacia Chișinău in the Moldovan National Division, on a two-year contract taking affect from May 2015.

He returned to Togo in the summer 2017, signing for Dynamic Togolais. He was selected as player of the month of the Togolese Championnat National in December 2017.

=== International ===
He played in the FIFA U17 World Cup in Korea in 2007.

Sapol was a victim of a serious car accident on 14 November 2009 in Togo.

== Personal life ==
Sapol is the brother of the footballer Mani Ougadja.

== Career statistics ==
=== International ===
Togo
Year	Apps	Goals
2008	1	0
2009	1	0
2010	5	2
2011	1	0
2012	3	0
2013	2	0
Total	13	2

Statistics accurate as of match played 14 June 2013

=== International goals ===
#	Date	Venue	Opponent	Score	Result	Competition
1	1 July 2010	Stade Omnisports Idriss Mahamat Ouya, N'Djamena, Chad	Chad	1-1	2-2	2012 Africa Cup of Nations qualification
2	10 October 2010	Stade de Kégué, Lomé, Togo	Tunisia	1-1	1-2	2012 Africa Cup of Nations qualification

== Honours ==
Al-Ittihad SCSC

- Libyan Premier League: 2007–08, 2008–09, 2009–10
- Libyan Cup: 2009
- Libyan League Cup: 2008–09
- Libyan Super Cup: 2007, 2008, 2009, 2010

Individual

- Togolese Young Player of the Year 2007
- Libyan Premier League Young Player of The Year 2007-08
