= 2007–08 Libyan Second Division =

Libyan soccer tournament season

The 2007–08 Libyan Second Division football championship took place between November 2007 and July 2008. The first round of matches were played between November 3 and November 5, 2007. The final round of games were played in July 2008.

== Competition ==
43 sides competed in this edition of the competition, split into three groups. Groups A and B contained 27 sides from the surrounding areas of Tripoli, Zawiya, Misrata and Sabha. These were split into two groups, Group A with 14 sides, Group B with 13 sides. Group C contained 16 teams from the surrounding areas of Butnan, Benghazi, Jabal al Akhdar and Sirte.

Every side in each group played each other home and away; therefore, each team in Group A played 26 games, Group B 24 games, and Group C 32 games.

== Promotion & Relegation ==
The team that finished top of each of the three groups won direct promotion to the Libyan Premier League, and would enter a mini-league at the end of the season to decide the winner of the competition. The team that finished second in each of the three groups entered a Relegation promotion play-off League, along with the 13th-placed side in the 2007–08 edition of the Libyan Premier League.

The bottom three sides in each of Group A and Group B, along with the bottom four sides in Group C were relegated to the Libyan Third Division.

== Teams ==
=== Group A ===
- Wefaq Sabratha
- Rafik Sorman
- Alharaty
- Attahaddy Misrata
- Al Yarmouk
- Al Jamarek
- Ghawt al Sha'al
- Al Ikhaa
- Al Talae'e
- Al Faaluja
- Majd
- Abu Moliyana
- Asswehly

=== Group B ===
- Abi al Ashar
- Al Shouraa
- Al Manshea
- Hiyad
- Mahalla
- Dhahra
- Al Salaam
- Qurthabia
- Aman al Aam
- Al Taraabet
- Al Charara
- Nojoom al Baazah
- Al Mustaqbal

=== Group C ===
- Al Buraaq
- Najma
- Al Shalaal
- Mukhtar B.
- Afriqi
- Darnes
- Al Ta'awon
- Al Sawa'ed
- Al Tayaraan
- Hilal
- Al Murooj
- Andalus
- Benghazi al Jadeeda
- Al Baranes
- Mukhtar T.
- Wahda B.

== League tables ==
=== Group A ===
Pos	Team	Pld	W	D	L	GF	GA	GD	Pts	Promotion or relegation
1	Sweahly (P)	25	18	3	4	62	21	+41	57	Promotion to Libyan Premier League
2	Wefaq Sabratha (Q)	25	16	6	3	46	23	+23	54	Qualification for Promotion/relegation playoffs
3	Abu Moliyana	25	14	6	5	35	23	+12	48	
4	Rafiq Sorman	25	13	8	4	47	25	+22	47	
5	Shmoo'e	25	10	6	9	39	28	+11	36	
6	Yarmouk	25	10	7	8	31	30	+1	35 (Note: Al Yarmouk deducted 2 points)	
7	Jamarek	25	8	10	7	30	26	+4	34	
8	Tala'e	25	9	6	10	40	26	+14	33	
9	Majd	25	6	14	5	27	25	+2	32	
10	Harati	25	6	9	10	22	28	−6	27	
11	Faaluja	25	2	11	12	27	52	−25	17	
12	Tahaddy Tumeanah (R)	25	0	10	15	20	56	−36	10	Relegation to Libyan Third Division
13	Ikhaa (R)	25	0	7	18	17	61	−44	7	Relegation to Libyan Third Division
14	Ghawt al Sha'al (R)	0	0	0	0	0	0	0	0 (Note: Ghawt al Sha'al withdrew from the league, and therefore all matches played against them in the second half of the season were deemed void matches)	Relegation to Libyan Third Division

Source: kooora.com
Rules for classification: 1) points; 2) head-to-head points; 3) head-to-head goal difference; 4) head-to-head goals scored; 5) goal difference; 6) number of goals scored.
(P) Promoted; (Q) Qualified for the phase indicated; (R) Relegated

=== Group B ===
Pos	Team	Pld	W	D	L	GF	GA	GD	Pts	Promotion or relegation
1	Aman al Aam (P)	24	20	3	1	57	15	+42	63	Promotion to Libyan Premier League
2	Mustaqbal (Q)	24	16	3	5	42	16	+26	51	Qualification for Promotion/relegation playoffs
3	Salaam	24	15	4	5	47	24	+23	49	
4	Dhahra Tripoli	24	14	4	6	37	21	+16	46	
5	Mahalla	24	11	7	6	33	18	+15	40	
6	Nojoom al Baazah	24	9	5	10	26	28	−2	32	
7	Hiyad	24	8	4	12	34	36	−2	28	
8	Charara	24	7	6	11	32	38	−6	27	
9	Shouraa	24	6	6	12	26	43	−17	24	
10	Abi al Ashar	24	5	6	13	29	42	−13	21	
11	Qurthabia (R)	24	4	8	12	22	41	−19	20	Relegation to Libyan Third Division
12	Manshea (R)	24	6	3	15	23	49	−26	19 (Note: Al Manshea deducted 2 points)	Relegation to Libyan Third Division
13	Taraabet (R)	24	3	5	16	20	47	−27	14	Relegation to Libyan Third Division

Source: kooora.com
Rules for classification: 1) points; 2) head-to-head points; 3) head-to-head goal difference; 4) head-to-head goals scored; 5) goal difference; 6) number of goals scored.
(P) Promoted; (Q) Qualified for the phase indicated; (R) Relegated

=== Group C ===
Pos	Team	Pld	W	D	L	GF	GA	GD	Pts	Promotion or relegation
1	Hilal (P)	29	23	4	2	78	12	+66	73	Promotion to Libyan Premier League
2	Sawa'ed (Q)	29	21	5	3	65	21	+44	68	Qualification for Promotion/relegation playoffs
3	Darnes	29	17	9	3	61	20	+41	60	
4	Najma	29	18	4	7	58	28	+30	58	
5	Baranes	29	15	6	8	52	33	+19	51	
6	Murooj	29	13	8	8	66	37	+29	47	
7	Andalus	29	13	7	9	51	38	+13	46	
8	Benghazi al Jadeeda	29	13	4	12	46	33	+13	43	
9	Afriqi	29	12	4	13	35	42	−7	40	
10	Wahda Benghazi	29	10	8	11	42	43	−1	38	
11	Ta'awon	29	9	5	15	34	47	−13	32	
12	Mukhtar Tobruk	29	6	4	19	23	61	−38	22	
13	Tayaraan (R)	29	5	4	20	28	56	−28	19	Relegation to Libyan Third Division
14	Buraaq (R)	29	5	3	21	21	68	−47	18	Relegation to Libyan Third Division
15	Shalaal (R)	29	2	0	27	19	116	−97	6	Relegation to Libyan Third Division
16	Mukhtar Benghazi (R)	0	0	0	0	0	0	0	0 (Note: Al Mukhtar Benghazi withdrew from the league, and therefore all matches played against them in the second half of the season were considered void.)	Relegation to Libyan Third Division

Source: kooora.com
Rules for classification: 1) points; 2) head-to-head points; 3) head-to-head goal difference; 4) head-to-head goals scored; 5) goal difference; 6) number of goals scored.
(P) Promoted; (Q) Qualified for the phase indicated; (R) Relegated

== Championship stage ==
This contained the three sides that topped each group. They had already won promotion to the Libyan Premier League.

=== Table ===
Team	Pld	W	D	L	GF	GA	GD	Pts
Hilal	4	3	1	0	10	3	+7	10
Aman al Aam	4	1	2	1	5	6	−1	5
Sweahly	4	0	1	3	5	11	−6	1

== Fixtures and results ==
May 21, 2008
17:00

Sweahly	0 – 1	Aman al Aam
(red card) 2H'		(1H); (red card) 2H' al Zikri (red card) 90'

9 July Stadium

May 23, 2008
17:00

Aman al Aam	1 – 1	Hilal
90+3'		al Ilwi 38'

GMR Stadium

May 27, 2008
17:00

Hilal	4 – 1	Sweahly
al Maqiny (1H) al Arfi (2H) (2H) (2H)		(2H)

First Statement Stadium

May 31, 2008
17:00

Aman al Aam	3 – 3	Sweahly
(2H) (2H) (2H); Farhaat (red card) 67'		al Deelawi 5'; Diop (1H) (2H)

GMR Stadium

June 4, 2008
17:00

Hilal	2 – 0	Aman al Aam
al Buqrmaoui 69' 72'

First Statement Stadium

June 7, 2008
17:00

Sweahly	1 – 3	Hilal
5'; (red card) 30'		(penalty missed); 75'; 80'; 90'

9 July Stadium

2007-08 Libyan Second Division Winners
(Libya)
Hilal
First title
