= 2007–08 Libyan relegation play-off =

The Libyan relegation play-off was contested between the three second-placed teams in the 3 groups in the 2007–08 Libyan Second Division: Wefaq Sabratha (Group A), Al Mustaqbal (Group B), and Al Sawa'ed (Group C) and the 13th placed team in the 2007–08 Libyan Premier League, which was Al Tahaddy. The four sides played each other once at neutral venues. The side that finished top would be promoted to the LPL, while if Al Tahaddy finished top, they would retain their place in the top flight.

The play-off was contested from July 28, 2008 to August 6, 2008. Wefaq Sabratha won the play-off on goal difference from Al Sawa'ed, therefore gaining promotion to the 2008–09 Libyan Premier League, and so Al Tahaddy were relegated.

== Table ==
Team	Pld	W	D	L	GF	GA	GD	Pts
Wefaq Sabratha	3	2	1	0	8	3	+5	7
Al Sawa'ed	3	2	1	0	6	4	+2	7
Al Tahaddy	3	1	0	2	6	6	0	3
Al Mustaqbal	3	0	0	3	1	8	-7	0

=== Match details ===
==== Round 1 ====
All Times EET

July 28, 2008
17:00

Al Sawa'ed	1 - 0	Al Mustaqbal
(penalty missed) 6'; Bangoura 71'

2 March Stadium, Sirte
July 29, 2008
17:00

Al Tahaddy	0 - 3	Wefaq Sabratha
		5'; Ya'qoub Abdallah 14'; 74' (pen.)

2 March Stadium, Sirte

==== Round 2 ====
August 1, 2008
17:00

Al Tahaddy	4 - 0	Al Mustaqbal
Alfa Baré; Abdelhakeem Ellafi 52', 85', 88'

2 March Stadium, Sirte
August 2, 2008
17:00

Al Sawa'ed	2 - 2	Wefaq Sabratha
86'; 87'; (red card) 2H'		Arthur Kofi Maxim 17'; 53'; (red card) 2H'; (red card) 2H'

2 March Stadium, Sirte

==== Round 3 ====
August 6, 2008
17:00

Al Tahaddy	2 - 3	Al Sawa'ed
William de Souza 47' (pen.), 64' (Cameroon) (red card) 73'		Hisham Aqealah 18' (pen.); Mohammed al Amary 37'; 68'; Hussein (red card) 90+4'

Green Document Stadium, Bayda
August 6, 2008
17:00

Wefaq Sabratha	3 - 1	Al Mustaqbal

Ajaylat Stadium, Ajaylat
