= 2009–10 in Libyan football =

The 2009-10 season will be the 97th season of competitive football in Libya.

The Premier League season will begin on October 1.

== Promotion and Relegation ==
=== Teams promoted to Libyan Premier League 2009–10 ===
- Tahaddy Benghazi
- Najma Benghazi

=== Teams relegated to Libyan Second Division 2009–10 ===
- Wefaq Sabratha
- Aljazeera Sports Club
- Wahda Tripoli
- Aman al Aam

=== Teams promoted to Libyan Second Division 2009–10 ===
- Reaf
- Nusoor al Martouba

=== Teams relegated to Libyan Third Division 2009-10 ===
- Dhahra Bani Waleed
- Sikat al Hadid
- Faaluja
- Shabab al Wahdawi
- Nusoor al Khaleej
- Wefaq Ajdabiya
- Hadaf
- Hilal Tobruk

== National team ==
October 5, 2009	Kuwait	1 – 1	Libya	Cairo
14:30	Hamad Enezi (red card) 34'; Mohamed Jarragh 56'		Marwan Mabrouk (red card) 30'; Ahmed Krewa'a 88'	Stadium: Al Shams Stadium

January 6, 2010	Benin	1 – 0	Libya	Cotonou
18:00 GMT	Stephane Sessegnon 19'			Stadium: Stade de l'Amitié
