= 2008–09 Libyan Premier League =

Libyan Premier League
- Season: 2008–09
- Champions: Ittihad Tripoli
- Runner up: Ahly Benghazi
- Relegated: Wahda Tripoli; Jazeera; Wefaq Sabratha; Aman al Aam
- Champions League: Ittihad Tripoli; Ahly Benghazi
- Confederation Cup: Ahly Tripoli; Tersanah (via cup)
- Goals: 572
- Average goals/game: 3.18
- Top goalscorer: Samir Al Wahaj (Tersanah) - 19 goals
- Biggest home win: Ittihad 6–1 Wahda Tripoli (21 May 2009)
- Biggest away win: Shat 1–9 Ahly Tripoli (5 June 2009)
- Highest scoring: Shat 1–9 Ahly Tripoli (5 June 2009) (10 goals)
- Longest unbeaten run: Ahly Benghazi - 16 matches (2009-02-08 to 2009-06-23)
- Longest losing run: Wahda Tripoli - 8 matches (2008-12-27 to 2009-03-27)

The 2008–09 Libyan Premier League season was the 42nd edition of the competition since its establishment in 1963. Al Ittihad were the defending champions, having won their fourteenth Libyan Premier League title with just one round of matches to spare in the previous season. The campaign began on Friday October 17, 2008, delayed due to Libya's World Cup qualifiers, and, depending on the Libyan Cup, is scheduled to finish on June 26, 2009. A total of 16 teams contested the league, including 13 who competed in the previous season and three promoted from the Libyan Second Division. (see 2007–08 Libyan Second Division)

The first goal of the season was scored by newly promoted Wefaq Sabratha's Stefan de Paul against 2003-04 champions Al Olomby in the thirty-second minute of the game on the opening day of the season on October 17. Atef Hussein of Al Olomby scored the first hat-trick of the season against Al Sweahly on December 16, netting two in the final six minutes to help his side to a 3–3 draw.

The season paused for its usual mid-season break. However, this season's break was extended due to the national team's participation in the 2009 African Championship of Nations, and participation (at club level) in Africa's continental competitions. The season continued on March 13.

Wahda Tripoli were the first club to be relegated following a 4–1 defeat to Ahly Benghazi on May 28, 2009.Wefaq Sabratha's relegation was also confirmed on June 18, 2009 despite defeating Jazeera 4–1, as other results went against them. Jazeera's defeat also meant that they would not be remaining in the division for next season. Aman al Aam were relegated on the final day of the season. Although they defeated Khaleej Sirte 2–0, they needed Hilal Benghazi to lose to Sweahly to stay up on head-to-head record. Hilal secured a 0–0 draw, ensuring their survival by one point.

Ittihad Tripoli won the title on June 19, 2009 after defeating Sweahly 2–1 to gain an unassailable lead over second-placed Ahly Benghazi. This was Ittihad's 5th league title in succession, and their 15th overall.

== Promotion and relegation ==
Teams promoted from 2007–08 Libyan Second Division

- Champions: Al-Hilal SCSC
- Promoted:
  - Asswehly
  - Al-Amn Al-Aam
- Play-Offs: Wefaq

Teams relegated to Libyan Second Division 2008–09

- Urouba
- Suqoor
- Nojom Ajdabiya

== League table ==
Pos	Team	Pld	W	D	L	GF	GA	GD	Pts	Qualification
1	Al-Ittihad SCSC (C)	30	22	5	3	54	15	+39	71	2010 CAF Champions League
2	Al-Ahly SCSC	30	20	7	3	60	24	+36	67	2010 CAF Champions League
3	Al-Ahly Tripoli	30	20	6	4	62	24	+38	66	2010 CAF Confederation Cup
4	Al-Akhdar	30	14	5	11	37	29	+8	47	
5	Al-Nasr SCSC	30	13	7	10	38	31	+7	46	
6	Khaleej Sirte	30	10	12	8	31	33	−2	42	
7	Al-Tarsana	30	10	10	10	35	34	+1	40 (Note: TER 2–1 SWE; SWE 2–1 TER)	2010 CAF Confederation Cup (Note: Tersanah qualify for CAF Confederation Cup as cup runners-up, as Ittihad had already secured a CAF Champions League place)
8	Asswehly	30	10	10	10	34	34	0	40	
9	Al-Madina	30	9	12	9	28	27	+1	39	
10	Aschat	30	9	8	13	43	57	−14	35 (Note: OLY 0–1 SHT; SHT 5–2 OLY)	
11	Olympic Zawia	30	7	14	9	35	39	−4	35	
12	Al-Hilal SCSC	30	7	10	13	25	42	−17	31	
13	Al-Amn Al-Aam (R)	30	8	6	16	22	37	−15	30	Relegation to Libyan Second Division
14	Wefaq (R)	30	6	11	13	22	33	−11	29	Relegation to Libyan Second Division
15	Al-Jazeera Zuwara (R)	30	8	2	20	21	49	−28	22 (Note: Jazeera deducted four points)	Relegation to Libyan Second Division
16	Al-Wehda SC (R)	30	2	5	23	25	65	−40	11	Relegation to Libyan Second Division

Updated to match(es) played on June 26, 2009. Source: RSSSF
Rules for classification: 1) points; 2) head-to-head points; 3) head-to-head goal difference; 4) head-to-head goals scored; 5) goal difference; 6) number of goals scored.
(C) Champions; (R) Relegated

== Results ==
Home \ Away	AHLB	AHLT	AKH	AMN	HIL	ITT	JAZ	KHA	MAD	NSR	OLY	SHT	SWE	TER	WAH	WFQ
Al-Ahly SCSC		1–1	1–0	4–0	2–0	1–0	3–0	0–1	1–1	2–1	5–2	2–0	3–1	3–0	4–1	1–0
Al-Ahly Tripoli	2–2		3–2 (Note: Match abandoned in the 94th minute with the score 3–2 after Joseph Fausto's sending off. Fighting broke out, and the referee was struck by a missile from the crowd. Remaining minute played on December 3, with no change to the result.)	1–2	2–0	0–2	4–0	4–0	0–0	2–0	1–0	4–1	1–2	2–0	2–1	3–1
Al-Akhdar	2–0 (Note: The game ended 0–0, but was later awarded as a 2–0 win to Akhdar, as Ahly Benghazi played a suspended player)	1–2		1–0	0–0	0–0	1–0	1–0	2–0	2–0	2–1	1–0	1–1	3–1	1–0	4–1
Al-Amn Al-Aam	0–2	0–1	1–0		3–1	0–2	2–1	2–0	0–1	0–1	1–3	0–3	1–2	0–2	1–0	0–0
Al-Hilal SCSC	1–4	0–2	1–4	1–0		0–1	2–2	0–0	2–1	3–2	0–1	2–3	1–1	0–0	2–1	0–0
Al-Ittihad SCSC	1–0	2–1	3–0	1–0	4–0		2–0	3–0	0–2	2–2	2–1	3–0	2–1	0–0	6–1	2–1
Al-Jazeera Zuwara	1–2	1–2 (Note: This match was suspended at half-time with the score at 1–1, as fighting broke out between both sets of supporters. The second half was played at the 2 March Stadium.)	1–4	1–1	0–1	0–2 (Note: Match awarded 2–0 to Ittihad after Jazeera fans invaded pitch and attacked referee, after Ittihad's 95th-minute winner. The referee had earlier given 9 minutes of stoppage time)		1–2	1–0	1–0	1–2	3–2	1–0	1–0	1–0	1–0
Khaleej Sirte	1–4	0–2	2–2	1–1	1–1	0–1	4–0		0–1	1–0	2–2	1–1	2–1	2–2	3–1	1–1
Al-Madina	3–3	0–1	3–1	2–0	1–0	1–1	1–0	0–1		0–0	0–0	2–2	1–2	1–1	2–1	1–0
Al-Nasr SCSC	1–1	2–2	2–0	1–0	2–0	1–0	1–0	1–2	1–1		0–0	1–2	3–0	1–0	4–0	1–4
Olympic Zawia	0–1	2–4	1–1	2–1	1–1	0–1	2–0	0–0	0–0	2–2		0–1	1–1	1–0	0–0	2–0
Aschat	3–3	1–9	2–0 (Note: Match awarded 2–0 to Shat after it was discovered that Akhdar played a suspended player. Match had originally finished 3–1 to Akhdar)	0–2	3–3	1–1	2–1	0–0	2–0	2–1	5–2		2–3	0–4	1–2	1–1
Asswehly	0–1	1–1	1–0	1–1	0–0	0–1	2–0	0–1	0–0	0–1	3–3	1–0		2–1	4–2	0–0
Al-Tarsana	0–0	0–0	1–0	2–2	1–0	1–3	1–0	1–1	2–1	0–1	1–1	2–1	2–1		4–2	1–1
Al-Wehda SC	0–2	0–2	0–1	0–1	0–1	1–5	0–1	1–2	2–2	2–3	1–1	1–1	1–3	3–2		1–1
Wefaq	1–2	0–1	1–0	0–0	1–2	0–1	4–1	0–0	1–0	0–2	2–2	2–1	0–0	1–3	2–0	

Updated to match(es) played on 26 June 2009. Source: goalzz.com
Legend: Blue = home team win; Yellow = draw; Red = away team win.

== Team summary ==
Club	City	Stadium	Manager	Sponsor	Kit Supplier	Position Last Season
Al-Ahly SCSC	Benghazi	March 28 Stadium^{1}	(Serbia) Draghon	Kia, Libyana	Nike	3rd
Al-Ahly Tripoli	Tripoli	June 11 Stadium	(Algeria) Nourredine al Sa'adi	Al Madar al Jadeed	Nike	2nd
Al-Akhdar	Bayda	Green Document Stadium	(Tunisia) Omar al Dheeb	Al Madar al Jadeed	Adidas	4th
Al-Amn Al-Aam	Tripoli	GMR Stadium	(Libya) Abdulraouf Bnour	Min Ajlikum	Diadora	1st, Group B (Second Division)
Al-Hilal SCSC	Benghazi	28 March Stadium^{1}	(Libya) Ahmed al Sanfaaz	Al Madar al Jadeed	Nike	1st, Group C (Second Division - Champions)
Al-Ittihad SCSC	Tripoli	June 11 Stadium	(Italy) Stefano Cusin	Total S.A., Al Madar al Jadeed	Puma	1st
Al-Jazeera Zuwara	Zuwara	Zuwara Stadium^{2}	(Tunisia) Lutfi Jabbara	Al Madar al Jadeed	Adidas	10th
Al-Madina	Tripoli	11 June Stadium	(Palestine) Mansour Saeed	Libyana	Diadora	7th
Al-Nasr SCSC	Benghazi	March 28 Stadium^{1}	(Libya) Naser al Hdairy	Libyana	Puma	6th
Al-Tarsana	Tripoli	Ali Alsgozy Stadium	(Libya) Khalid al Marjiny	Min Ajlikum	Adidas	11th
Al-Wehda SC	Tripoli	GMR Stadium	(Czech Republic) Otkar Barec	Min Ajlikum	Adidas	12th
Aschat	Tripoli	GMR Stadium	(Tunisia) Lutfi Sellami	Libyana	Puma	9th
Asswehly	Misrata	9th July Stadium	(Tunisia) Khamees Alabaidy	Min Ajlikum	Puma	1st, Group A (Second Division)
Khaleej Sirte	Sirte	March 2 Stadium	(Libya) Abdelhafidh Arbeesh	Libyana	Adidas	5th
Olympic Zawia	Zawiya	Zaawia Stadium	(Libya) Izzedine Khmealah	Kia, Libyana	Nike	8th
Wefaq	Sabratha	Sabratha Stadium; Ajaylat Stadium^{3}	(Tunisia) Tariq Thabit	Al Madar al Jadeed	Nike	2nd, Group A (Second Division); Promoted via playoffs

^{1} As the 28 March Stadium was not re-opened until October 22, 2008, Benghazi clubs played at stadia selected by the Libyan Football Federation. Some fixtures were also re-arranged so that these clubs played away from home for rounds 1 & 2.
^{2} Due to Al Jazeera's ban from their Zuwara Stadium, the club will play their remaining home games at 9 July Stadium for the remainder of the season.
^{3} Wefaq Sabratha's used the Ajaylat Stadium from rounds 1-8 as their own Sabratha Stadium was undergoing maintenance.

NB: The newly constructed Benina Stadium will be used to host matches held in Benghazi, as the 28 March Stadium is undergoing maintenance. The 28 March Stadium will not be in use for the rest of this season.

== Awards ==
- Best fans : Ittihad Tripoli
- Best foreign player : Samer Saeed of Ahly Tripoli
- Best young player : Abdulaziz Belreesh of Ittihad Tripoli
- Best goalkeeper : Samir Aboud of Ittihad Tripoli
- Best defender : Younes Al Shibani of Ittihad Tripoli
- Best midfielder : Mohamed Esnany of Ittihad Tripoli
- Best striker : Ahmed Zuway of Ittihad Tripoli

== Season statistics ==
=== Goals ===
- First match of the season: October 17, 2008 - Akhdar vs. Tersanah, 14:00 EET
- First goal of the season: Stefan de Paul for Wefaq Sabratha against Olomby, 38 minutes and 46 seconds (October 17, 2008)
- Last goal of the season: Adnan Belaid for Ahly Tripoli against Tersanah, 84th minute (June 26, 2009)
- Fastest goal of the season: 11 seconds - Ismael Bangoura for Al Sweahly against Al Ahly Tripoli (March 25, 2009)
- First own goal of the season: Jasim al Toumi (Wahda) for Nasr, 90+1 minutes and 32 seconds (April 11, 2009)
- Goal scored at latest point in a match: 90+6 minutes and 36 seconds - Imad al Traiky for Tersanah against Aman al Aam (December 16, 2008)
- Widest winning margin: 8 goals: Shat 1–9 Ahly Tripoli (June 5, 2009)
- Most goals in a match: 10 goals: Shat 1–9 Ahly Tripoli (June 5, 2009)
- Most goals in one half: 6 goals - Shat 1–9 Ahly Tripoli (June 5, 2009) 0–4 half time, 1–9 final
- Most goals scored by one player in a match: 4 goals - Pierre Koulibaly (Ittihad Tripoli) against Wahda Tripoli, 16' (pen.) 24' 29' 81' (21 May 2009)
- First hat-trick: Atef Hussein for Olomby vs Sweahly (December 17, 2008)
- Fastest hat-trick: Pierre Koulibaly (Ittihad Tripoli) against Wahda (May 21, 2009); 16' (pen.) 24' 29' (13 minutes and 28 seconds)
- Most goals in one half by a single team: 5 goals - Shat vs. Ahly Tripoli (21 May 2009) 0–4 at half time, 1–9 final

=== Discipline ===
- First sending off of the season: Imaad al Khafi for Tersanah against Akhdar - October 17, 2008 (62nd minute)
- Card given at latest point in a game: Mahmoud Makhlouf (red) at 90+8 minutes and 4 seconds for Ittihad against Jazeera (January 16, 2009)
- First match referred by a Libyan referee: Akhdar vs. Tersanah (October 17, 2008 - (Libya) Mohammed Azzallawi)
- First match refereed by a foreign referee: Ahly Tripoli vs. Ahly Benghazi (October 17, 2008 - (Morocco) Khalil Rouaissi)
- Most red cards in a single match: 4: Akhdar 1–0 Khaleej Sirte - 2 for Akhdar (Khalifa al Mear & Marei Al Ramly) and 2 for Khaleej (Mohammad Abu Rqiqa & Mohammad Shleeq) (June 13, 2009)

=== Other ===
- Longest injury time of season: 15 minutes, 4 seconds - Ahly Tripoli 0–2 Ittihad Tripoli (June 10, 2009)

== Top scorers ==
As of June 26, 2009

Rank	Scorer	Club	Goals
1	(Libya) Samir al Wahaj	Tersanah	19
2	(Libya) Ahmed Abdelkafi	Shat	17
3	(Libya) Nader Kara	Ahly Tripoli	14
4	(Senegal) Sarra Camara	Nasr	12
4	(Guinea) Ibrahim al Khalil	Ahly Benghazi	12
6	(Libya) Atef Hussain^{1}	Ittihad	11
6	(Libya) Ahmed Zuway	Ittihad	11
8	(Libya) Abdelhameed Zidane	Akhdar	10
9	(Libya) Ahmed Saad	Ahly Tripoli	9
9	(Libya) Moataz Ben Amer	Ahly Benghazi	9
9	(Morocco) Younes Baltahaam	Ahly Benghazi	9
12	(Libya) Wisaam Boukteaf	Akhdar	8
12	(Morocco) Abdelmajid Eddine	Nasr	8

^{1} 7 goals for Al Olomby

== Stadia ==
Location of the 2008–09 Libyan Premier League teams

Team	Stadium	Capacity
Al-Ahly Tripoli; Al-Ittihad SCSC; Al-Madina	11 June Stadium	60,000
Al-Ahly SCSC; Al-Hilal SCSC; Al-Nasr SCSC	28 March Stadium; Martyrs of February Stadium	50,000; 10,550
Olympic Zawia	Zaawia Stadium	14,000
Al-Akhdar	Al Bayda Stadium	9,000
Asswehly	9 July Stadium	8,000
Al-Amn Al-Aam; Al-Wehda SC; Aschat	GMR Stadium	6,000
Al-Tarsana	Ali Alsgozy Stadium	4,000
Khaleej Sirte	2 March Stadium	3,000
Al-Jazeera Zuwara	Zuwara Stadium	2,000
Wefaq	Sabratha Stadium	2,000

== Attendances ==
The 2008-09 Libyan Premier League clubs sorted by average home league attendance:

#	Club	Average
1	Al-Ittihad SCSC	12,487
2	Al-Ahly Tripoli	11,832
3	Al-Ahly SCSC	3,842
4	Al-Nasr SCSC	2,716
5	Al-Madina	1,432
6	Al-Akhdar	1,198
7	Khaleej Sirte	987
8	Al-Tarsana	921
9	Asswehly	865
10	Aschat	812
11	Olympic Zawia	754
12	Al-Hilal SCSC	703
13	Al-Amn Al-Aam	482
14	Wefaq	438
15	Al-Jazeera Zuwara	314
16	Al-Wehda SC	276
Average per club		2,504

== See also ==
- 2007–08 Libyan Premier League
- 2008–09 Libyan Second Division
- 2007–08 Libyan Second Division
