= 2009–10 Libyan Second Division – Group B =

== Clubs ==
Club	City	Position Last Season
Wahda	Tripoli	Premier League, 16th (Relegated)
Aman al Aam	Tripoli	Premier League, 13th (Relegated)
Mahalla	Tripoli	1st, Group A
Dhahra	Tripoli	1st, Group B
Majd	Tripoli	5th, Group B
Jamarek	Tripoli	7th, Group A
Abu Moliyana	Tripoli	8th, Group B
Abi al Ashar	Tripoli	9th, Group A
Amal	Tarhuna	Third Division (Promoted)

== Results ==
Home \ Away	ABI	ABM	AML	AMN	DHAT	JMR	MHL	MJD	WAH
Abi al Ashar		0–1	6–1	2–2	1–2	1–1	1–5	2–0	0–2
Abu Moliyana	3–4		2–0	2–1	1–1	2–2	1–2	1–2	0–0
Amaal	1–0	0–3 (Note: Match replayed having been awarded 2–0 to Abu Moliyana.)		0–4	0–1	1–3	2–6	0–3	0–3
Aman al Aam	0–1	0–1	4–0		0–0	1–2	2–0 (Note: Match awarded 2–0 to Aman al Aam by LFF after Mahalla played an ineligible player. Match had originally finished 2–1 to Mahalla)	2–2	2–3
Dhahra Tripoli	0–1	2–1	1–0	2–1		2–1	0–1	1–2	0–2
Jamarek	1–0	0–1	3–3	1–0	2–0		0–0	1–1	0–0
Mahalla	1–0	1–2	5–0	2–2	2–1	1–0		1–0	0–2
Majd	1–1	2–1	5–1	0–0	1–3	1–2	1–1		1–0
Wahda	2–1	0–1	3–0	0–1	1–1	2–1	3–2	3–2	

Updated to match(es) played on 2010-03-10. Source: kooora.com (in Arabic)
Legend: Blue = home team win; Yellow = draw; Red = away team win.

== League table ==
Pos	Team	Pld	W	D	L	GF	GA	GD	Pts	Qualification or relegation
1	Wahda (A)	16	10	3	3	26	12	+14	33	Qualification for Promotion Stage
2	Mahalla	16	9	3	4	30	17	+13	30	
3	Abu Moliyana	16	8	3	5	23	17	+6	27	
4	Jamarek	16	6	6	4	20	16	+4	24	
5	Dhahra Tripoli	16	7	3	6	18	17	+1	24	
6	Majd	16	6	5	5	24	20	+4	23	
7	Abi al Ashar	16	5	3	8	21	23	−2	18	
8	Aman al Aam	16	4	5	7	22	18	+4	17	
9	Amaal (R)	16	1	1	14	9	53	−44	0 (Note: Amaal deducted four points for playing a suspended player in their match against Dhahra and financial irregularities.)	Relegation to Libyan Third Division

Updated to match(es) played on 2010-03-10. Source: kooora.com (in Arabic)
Rules for classification: 1) points; 2) head-to-head points; 3) head-to-head goal difference; 4) head-to-head goals scored; 5) goal difference; 6) number of goals scored.
(A) Advance to a further round; (R) Relegated

== Top scorers ==
Pos	Player	Club	Goals
1	(Nigeria) Samuel Aktouba	Wahda	8
2	Ahmed Estoukah	Abi al Ashar	7
3	Khalid Sa'eed	Abu Moliyana	6
3	Rabee' Abu Saif	Aman al Aam	6
3	Ashraf Abu Zayaan	Majd	6
6	Hani al Sharif	Mahalla	5
6	Muhannad Abu Nawaara	Aman al Aam	5
6	Abu Zaid Salih	Mahalla	5
