= 2008 Libyan Al-Fatih Cup final =

2008 Libyan Cup final
- Event: Libyan Cup 2007–08
Al Madina	Khaleej Sirte
0	1
- Date: 26 July 2008
- Venue: 11 June Stadium, Tripoli
- Referee: (Tunisia) Riadh Herzi
- Attendance: 60,000

The 2007–08 Libyan Cup final was a football match held at 11 June Stadium on July 26, 2008. The match was contested by Khaleej Sirte and Al Madina. This was the first time in ten years that one of the Big Two of Libyan football, Al Ahly Tripoli and Al Ittihad, were not in the final. The match was a tense affair as this was Khaleej Sirte's first final, and as Al Madina had lost their last two, and their last cup win was in 1978, both sides, with similar league finishes, cancelled each other out. Khaleej Sirte won the game, with an 81st-minute goal from Idrees Salem, and thus, secured qualification for the 2009 CAF Confederation Cup and the 2008 Libyan Super Cup. This trophy was Sirte's first major honour.

== Match details ==
July 26, 2008
17:00

Al Madina	0 – 1	Khaleej Sirte
		Salem 81'

11 June Stadium
Attendance: 60,000
Referee: Riyadh Al-Harazi (Tunisia)
