= 2007–08 Libyan Cup =

The 2007-08 Libyan Cup was the 18th edition of the competition since its inception in 1976. 58 clubs entered this edition of the competition.

The competition ended with the Libyan Cup Final, held at the 11 June Stadium, Tripoli, on July 26, 2008. The title was contested between Khaleej Sirte and Al Madina, with Khaleej winning 1-0, Idrees Salem scoring the only goal.

== Road to the final ==
=== Round of 32 ===
February 11, 2008
15:00 EET

Khaleej Sirte	1 – 0	Rafik Sorman

2 March Stadium

February 11, 2008
18:00 EET

Al Madina	4 – 1	Al Charara

11 June Stadium

=== Round of 16 ===
February 25, 2008
17:30 EET

Al Wahda	1 – 1 (3 – 4 pens.)	Khaleej Sirte

The Industrial River Stadium
Referee: Adil Arra'ee

February 26, 2008
17:30 EET

Al Madina	2 – 1	Al Olympic

11 June Stadium
Referee: Adil Al'abany

=== Quarter-finals ===
April 4, 2008
15:30 EET

Nojom Ajdabiya	0 – 1	Al Madina
		Walid Hadnoon 90+3'

Ajdabiya Stadium
Referee: Khalid 'Adaal

April 8, 2008
17:00 EET

Khaleej Sirte	3 – 2	Al Akhdar
Masoud Al Ghonaay; Achour Majeed; Al-Sheikh Sedao		Joseph Fausto

2 March Stadium

=== Semi-finals ===
July 12, 2008
17:00 EET

Khaleej Sirte	5 – 2	Al Ahly Tripoli
Sa'ad Abdelhafeedh 9'; Ez-eddin Khozaam 19'; Al-Sheikh Sedao 44' 84'; Achour Majeed 76'		Ahmad Saad 32' (pen.); Samer Saeed 66'

2 March Stadium
Referee: Khalid Adaal
July 12, 2008
17:00 EET

Al Madina	2 – 0	Al Nasr
Omar Diop 14'; Ahmed Shalabi 45'

11 June Stadium
Referee: (Tunisian Officials)

=== Final ===
July 26, 2008
17:00

Al Madina	0 – 1	Khaleej Sirte
		Salem 81'

11 June Stadium
Attendance: 60,000
Referee: Riyadh Al-Harazi (Tunisia)
