= Al-Qaritliya =

The Al-Qurait or "Al-Kreet" in Libya are Libyans whose origins trace back to the Island of Crete (currently part of Greece). The island was under Ottoman rule from 1646 until 1897, when it became an autonomous Creatan State under Ottoman suzerainty. This status continued until the outbreak of the Balkan Wars, after which the Ottoman Empire relinquished the island, leading to its official annexation by Greece on December 1, 1913. All Al-Qurait people in Libya are Muslim Libyans.

Their origins in Libya date back to migration waves that took place in multiple stages and for various reasons. Some migrated to Libya because it was an Ottoman territory at the time, while others fled Crete after the fall of Islamic rule on the island. The Al-Qurait enjoy full citizenship rights under the Libyan Monarchical Constitution, which grants citizenship to "anyone who resided in Libya prior to the war with Italy." Most of them live in Susa, Shahhat, Al-Bayda, and Benghazi, with some residing in Tripoli.
