= 2009–10 Libyan Second Division – Group C =

== Clubs ==
| Club | City | Position Last Season |
|---|---|---|
| Harati | Khoms | 2nd, Group A |
| Hiyad | Misrata | 8th, Group A |
| Nojoom al Baazah | Zliten | 7th, Group B |
| Al Shmoo'e | Misrata | 4th, Group B |
| Reaf | Khoms | Third Division, (Promoted) |
| Sharrara | Sabha | 9th, Group B |
| Al Mahdeeya | Sabha | 6th, Group A |
| Al Qal'aa | Waddan | 6th, Group B |
| Qurthabia | Sabha | Third Division (Promoted) |

== Results ==
| Home \ Away | HRT | HYD | MHD | NJMB | QLA | QRH | REA | SHR | SHM |
|---|---|---|---|---|---|---|---|---|---|
| Harati | | 1–0 | 1–0 | 3–2 | 2–1 | 3–2 | 3–0 | 1–0 | 0–0 |
| Hiyad | 2–0 | | 2–2 | 5–2 | 1–0 | 8–2 | 1–1 | 1–0 | 2–2 |
| Mahdeeya | 0–0 | 2–0 | | 1–0 | 3–0 | 1–0 | 2–0 | 1–1 | 3–0 |
| Nojoom Al Baazah | 1–0 | 0–0 | 1–2 | | 2–0 | 1–1 | 2–2 | 0–0 | 1–2 |
| Qal'aa | 0–1 | 2–1 | 2–2 | 2–0 | | 3–0 | 0–2 | 1–1 | 2–0 |
| Qurthabia | 1–3 | 2–2 | 0–1 | 2–1 | 0–3 | | 4–1 | 0–0 | 2–2 |
| Reaf | 0–1 | 1–1 | 1–1 | 3–1 | 1–1 | 1–2 | | 0–0 | 1–0 |
| Sharrara | 1–2 | 1–0 | 1–2 | 1–3 | 1–1 | 5–2 | 2–3 | | 1–1 |
| Shmoo'e | 1–1 | 0–1 | 0–1 | 0–0 | 3–2 | 2–1 | 2–0 | 0–2 (Note: Match awarded 2-0 to Sharrara after it was discovered that Shmoo'e had played a suspended player. Match had originally finished 1-0 to Shmoo'e.) | |

Updated to match(es) played on 2010-03-07. Source: kooora.com (in Arabic)
Legend: Blue = home team win; Yellow = draw; Red = away team win.

== League table ==
| Pos | Team | Pld | W | D | L | GF | GA | GD | Pts | Qualification or relegation |
|---|---|---|---|---|---|---|---|---|---|---|
| 1 | Harati (A) | 16 | 11 | 3 | 2 | 22 | 11 | +11 | 36 | Qualification for Promotion Stage |
| 2 | Mahdeeya | 16 | 10 | 5 | 1 | 24 | 9 | +15 | 35 | |
| 3 | Hiyad | 16 | 6 | 6 | 4 | 27 | 18 | +9 | 24 | |
| 4 | Qal'aa | 16 | 6 | 3 | 7 | 21 | 19 | +2 | 21 | |
| 5 | Shmoo'e | 16 | 4 | 6 | 6 | 15 | 20 | −5 | 18 (Note: SHM 2–0 REF; REF 1–0 SHM) | |
| 6 | Reaf | 16 | 4 | 6 | 6 | 17 | 23 | −6 | 18 | |
| 7 | Sharrara | 16 | 3 | 6 | 7 | 16 | 19 | −3 | 15 | |
| 8 | Nojoom Al Baazah | 16 | 3 | 5 | 8 | 17 | 24 | −7 | 14 | |
| 9 | Qurthabia (R) | 16 | 3 | 4 | 9 | 21 | 37 | −16 | 13 | Relegation to Libyan Third Division |

Updated to match(es) played on 2010-03-07. Source: kooora.com (in Arabic)
Rules for classification: 1) points; 2) head-to-head points; 3) head-to-head goal difference; 4) head-to-head goals scored; 5) goal difference; 6) number of goals scored.
(A) Advance to a further round; (R) Relegated
