= Omar Al Khouja =

Libyan footballer (born 2000)

Personal information
- Full name: Omar Yousef Nouri Al-Khouja
- Date of birth: 1 March 2000 (age 26)
- Place of birth: Tripoli, Libya
- Position: Midfielder

Senior career*
Years	Team	Apps	(Gls)
2021–	Al-Ittihad Tripoli		

International career^{‡}
2021–	Libya	28	(7)
- * Club domestic league appearances and goals ‡ National team caps and goals as of 6 June 2024

Omar Al Khouja (born 1 March 2000) is a Libyan professional footballer who plays as a midfielder for the Libya national team.

He made his international debut on 1 September 2021, in a 2022 FIFA World Cup qualifier against Gabon in a 2–1 victory. On 7 September 2021, Al Khouja scored his first goal for Libya against Angola in a 1–0 victory.

== International goals ==
No	Date	Venue	Opponent	Score	Result	Competition
1.	7 September 2021	Estádio 11 de Novembro, Luanda, Angola	Angola	1–0	1–0	2022 FIFA World Cup qualification
2.	1 February 2022	Jaber Al-Ahmad International Stadium, Kuwait City, Kuwait	Kuwait	1–0	2–0	Friendly
3.	11 November 2023	Martyrs of February Stadium, Benina, Libya	Sudan	2–1	2–1	Friendly
4.	2 January 2024	Mardan Sports Complex, Antalya, Libya	Indonesia	2–0	4–0	Friendly
5.	12 January 2024	Cairo International Stadium, Cairo, Egypt	Kuwait	1–0	3–1	Friendly
6.	12 January 2024	Cairo International Stadium, Cairo, Egypt	Kuwait	2–0	3–1	Friendly
7.	22 March 2024	Père Jégo Stadium, Casablanca, Morocco	Burkina Faso	2–1	2–1	Friendly
