= Mohammed Soulah =

Libyan footballer (born 1993)

Personal information
- Full name: Mohammed Salih Ali Soulah
- Date of birth: 29 July 1993 (age 33)
- Place of birth: Tripoli, Libya
- Height: 1.84 m (6 ft 0 in)
- Position: Winger

Team information
- Current team: Zakho SC
- Number: 77

Senior career*
Years	Team	Apps	(Gls)
2014–2017	Al Ahli Tripoli		
2018–2019	Muharraq		(10)
2020	Riffa		(7)
2020–2022	CS Sfaxien	25	(5)
2022–2023	Al Arabi Kuwaiti	43	(24)
2023–2026	Qadsia SC	31	(10)
2026–	Zakho SC	5	

International career^{‡}
2016–	Libya	34	(3)
- * Club domestic league appearances and goals as of 09 March 2026 ‡ National team caps and goals as of 29 July 2028

Mohammed Salih Ali Soulah (Arabic: محمد صولة, born 29 July 1993) is a Libyan professional footballer who plays as a winger for Iraqi club Zakho SC.

== Career statistics ==
=== Club ===
As of 21 March 2021.

Club	Season	League			Cup		Continental		Other		Total	
Club	Season	Division	Apps	Goals	Apps	Goals	Apps	Goals	Apps	Goals	Apps	Goals
Sfaxien	2020–21	CLP-1	15	3	0	0	4 (Note: Two appearances and two goals in the CAF Confederation Cup, two appearances in the CAF Champions League)	2	0	0	19	5
Career total			15	3	0	0	4	2	0	0	19	5

=== International ===
As of matches played 13 October 2025

National team	Year	Apps	Goals
Libya	2016	2	0
Libya	2017	3	0
Libya	2018	3	0
Libya	2019	4	0
Libya	2020	2	0
Libya	2021	5	0
Libya	2022	9	3
Libya	2023	2	0
Libya	2024	–	
Libya	2025	4	0
Total		34	3

Scores and results list Libya's goal tally first, score column indicates score after each Soulah goal.

List of international goals scored by Mohammed Soulah
No.	Date	Venue	Opponent	Score	Result	Competition
1	26 March 2022	Cheikha Ould Boïdiya Stadium, Nouakchott, Mauritania	Niger	1–0	2–1	Friendly
2	27 September 2022	Benina Martyrs Stadium, Benina, Libya	Tanzania	1–0	2–1	Friendly
3	27 September 2022	Benina Martyrs Stadium, Benina, Libya	Tanzania	2–1	2–1	Friendly
