= Libyan Men's Handball Championship =

- Current season, competition or edition: 2025–26 Libyan Handball League
- Sport: Handball
- First season: 1972; 54 years ago
- Administrator: Libyan Handball Federation
- No. of teams: 10 teams
- Country: Libya
- Confederation: CAHB
- Continent: Africa
- Most recent champion: Al Ahli Tripoli (13th titles) (2025–26)
- Most titles: Al Ahli Tripoli (13 titles)
- Level on pyramid: Level 1
- Relegation to: National 2
- Domestic cups: Libyan Cup; Libyan Super Cup
- International cups: CAHB African Club Championship; Arab Clubs Championship

The Libyan Men's Handball Championship ( Arabic : الدورى الليبي لكرة اليد للرجال ) represents the highest tier of men's handball competition in Libya. Governed by the Libyan Handball Federation, the league features the country's top clubs competing for the national championship. As of the 2025–26 season, the competition consists of 10 clubs from across Libya. The regular season features 10 teams divided into two groups. Within each group, teams compete against one another twice on a home-and-away basis. At the conclusion of the group stage, the top three teams from each group advance to the final stage, where six teams compete to determine the league champion.

== Titles by club ==
Titles by club
| Rank | Club | Titles |
|---|---|---|
| 1 | Al Ahli Tripoli | 13 |
| 2 | Al Ittihad SC | 11 |
| 3 | Al Hilal SC | 4 |
| 4 | Al Nasr SC | 3 |
| 4 | Al Ahly Benghazi | 3 |
| 4 | Aljazeera SC | 3 |
| 7 | Al Ittihad Military | 2 |
| 8 | Al Wahda SC | 1 |
| 8 | Darnes SC | 1 |
| 8 | Baladiyat Tripoli SC | 1 |
| 8 | Police Union | 1 |
| 8 | Annajma SC | 1 |

Sources :

== Winners list ==
| No. | Season | Champion |
|---|---|---|
| 1 | 1972–73 | Al Wahda SC |
| 2 | 1973–74 | Al Ahli Tripoli |
| 3 | 1976–77 | Darnes SC |
| 4 | 1977–78 | Al Ahli Tripoli |
| 5 | 1978–79 | Al Ittihad SC |
| 6 | 1979–80 | Al Ittihad Military |
| 7 | 1980–81 | Baladiyat Tripoli SC |
| 8 | 1981–82 | Al Ittihad SC |
| 9 | 1982–83 | Al Ittihad SC |
| 10 | 1983–84 | Al Ittihad SC |
| 11 | 1984–85 | Al Ahli Tripoli |
| 12 | 1985–86 | Al Nasr SC |
| 13 | 1986–87 | Al Ahli Tripoli |
| 14 | 1987–88 | Al Ittihad Military |
| 15 | 1989–90 | Al Ahly Benghazi |
| 16 | 1990–91 | Al Hilal SC |

| No. | Season | Champion |
|---|---|---|
| 17 | 1991–92 | Al Ahli Tripoli |
| 18 | 1992–93 | Al Hilal SC |
| 19 | 1993–94 | Al Ahli Tripoli |
| 20 | 1995–96 | Al Ahly Benghazi |
| 21 | 1996–97 | Aljazeera SC |
| 22 | 1997–98 | Police Union |
| 23 | 1998–99 | Al Hilal SC |
| 24 | 1999–2000 | Al Ahli Tripoli |
| 25 | 2000–01 | Al Ahli Tripoli |
| 26 | 2001–02 | Al Ittihad SC |
| 27 | 2002–03 | Al Ittihad SC |
| 28 | 2003–04 | Al Ittihad SC |
| 29 | 2004–05 | Al Ahli Tripoli |
| 30 | 2005–06 | Al Ittihad SC |
| 31 | 2006–07 | Aljazeera SC |
| 32 | 2007–08 | Aljazeera SC |

| No. | Season | Champion |
|---|---|---|
| 33 | 2008–09 | Al Nasr SC |
| 34 | 2009–10 | Al Nasr SC |
| — | 2010–2014 | Suspended |
| 35 | 2014–15 | Annajma SC |
| 36 | 2016–17 | Al Ittihad SC |
| 37 | 2017–18 | Al Ittihad SC |
| 38 | 2018–19 | Al Ittihad SC |
| 39 | 2020–21 | Al Ahli Tripoli |
| 40 | 2021–22 | Al Ahli Tripoli |
| 41 | 2022–23 | Al Ahli Tripoli |
| 42 | 2023–24 | Al Hilal SC |
| 43 | 2024–25 | Al Ahly Benghazi |
| 44 | 2025–26 | Al Ahli Tripoli |

Sources :
