= 2008 North African Cup Winners Cup =

The 2008 North African Cup Winners Cup was the first edition of the competition created by the Federation of North African Football. ES Tunis were the champions, defeating JSM Béjaïa 2-1 over two legs.

== Participating teams ==
Algeria	JSM Béjaïa (Algerian Cup Winners 2007-08)
Egypt	Al-Masry^{2} (Invited)
Libya	Khaleej Sirte (Libyan Cup Winners 2007-08)
Morocco	Maghreb Fez (Coupe du Trône Runners-Up 2007-08)^{1}
Tunisia	ES Tunis (Tunisia Cup Winners 2007-08)

^{1} FAR Rabat won the Coupe du Trône, but as they are already playing the North African Cup of Champions, Maghreb Fez were invited to compete instead.

^{2} Al Zamalek withdrew.

== The System ==
The Libyan representative and the Moroccan representative will contest a two-legged tie, first leg on November 19, second leg November 25, to qualify for the semi-finals, the draw for which will be made on November 23 in Tunis. The semi-finals will be played sometime in December, with the final being played in January 2009.

== The Awards ==
- The Champions: $100,000
- The Runner-up: $50,000
- 3rd & 4th Place: $20,000 (shared)

== The qualifying round ==
(Libya) Khaleej Sirte 0 - 4 (Morocco) Maghreb Fez

=== First leg ===
November 19, 2008
15:00 GMT

Maghreb Fez	3 – 0	Khaleej Sirte
Fall 9' 56'; Mraini 69'

Complexe Hassan II
Attendance: 15,000

=== Second leg ===
December 3, 2008
15:00 EET

Khaleej Sirte	0 – 1	Maghreb Fez
		Bouden 90+2'

2 March Stadium
Attendance: 1,500

Maghreb Fez advance to the Semi-finals with an aggregate score of 4-0

== Semi-finals ==
The draw for this round of the competition was made on November 23 in Tunis. The first legs will be played on December 18, and the second legs will be played either on December 24 or December 26. JSM Béjaïa, Al-Masry and ES Tunis were automatically given byes to this round of the competition. These three teams and the winner of the qualifying stage will make up the semi-finals.

=== Draw ===
==== First Legs ====
(Egypt) Al-Masry 1 - 0 (Algeria) JSM Béjaïa (December 5)
(Tunisia) ES Tunis 4 - 4 (Morocco) Maghreb Fez (December 18)

December 5, 2008
15:00 GMT

Al-Masry	1 – 0	JSM Béjaïa
Abdel Azim 26' (pen.)

Port Said Stadium
Attendance: 15,000

December 18, 2008
14:00 GMT

ES Tunis	4 – 4	Maghreb Fez
Ltaïef 23' (pen.), 41'; Al Sheikh 25'; Youssefi 72'		Fall 15'; Sissi 43', 60'; Alharari 66'

Stade El Menzah
Attendance: 25,000

==== Second Legs ====
(Morocco) Maghreb Fez 0 - 1 (Tunisia) ES Tunis (December 24)
(Algeria) JSM Béjaïa 2 - 0 (Egypt) Al-Masry (December 26)

December 24, 2008
18:00 GMT

Maghreb Fez	0 – 1	ES Tunis
		Bouazzi 90+2'

Complexe Hassan II

ES Tunis advance to the Final with an aggregate score of 5-4

December 26, 2008
14:00 GMT

JSM Béjaïa	2 – 0	Al-Masry
Bouksessassa 9'; Boukemacha (red card) 36'; Boulemdaïs 77'	Report	H. Hassan (manager) (red card) 67'; I. Hassan (manager) (red card) 90'

Stade de l'Unité Maghrébine
Attendance: 15,000
Referee: Khaled Ramssis (Morocco)

JSM Béjaïa advance to the Final with an aggregate score of 2-1

== Final ==
=== First leg ===
January 7, 2009
14:00 GMT

JSM Béjaïa	0 – 0	ES Tunis

Stade de l'Unité Maghrébine
Referee: (Libya) Adil al Ra'ee

=== Second leg ===
January 20, 2009

ES Tunis	2 – 1	JSM Béjaïa
Konan 6'; Bouazzi 38'		Yannick N'Djeng 63'

Stade El Menzah
Referee: (Morocco) Abdallah al Ashairy

2008 North African Cup Winners Cup Winners
(Tunisia)
ES Tunis
First title

attendance = 40.000
