= 2007–08 Libyan Trophy =

Football tournament

The 2007-08 Libyan Trophy was the first edition of the competition, organised by the Libyan Football Federation. The first round of matches took place on May 23, 2008, with the final taking place on June 18. The sixteen sides that competed in the 2007-08 Libyan Premier League entered the competition, with the exception of Al Ahly Tripoli and Al Jazeera. The fourteen remaining sides were sorted into four groups, half with three teams, the other half with four teams. Groups A and B contained teams from Western Libya, and Groups C and D contained teams from Eastern Libya. Each team played each other once, with the top team from each group going through to form the semi-finals.

== Awards ==
- Winners - LYD 100,000
- Runners-Up - LYD 50,000
- 3rd Place - LYD 25,000

== Groups ==
=== Group A ===
- Al Tersanah
- Al Madina
- Al Olomby
- Al Shat

Team	Pld	W	D	L	GF	GA	GD	Pts
Al Tersanah	3	2	1	0	4	2	+2	7
Al Madina	3	0	3	0	4	4	0	3
Al Olomby	3	0	2	1	3	4	-1	2
Al Shat	3	0	2	1	3	4	-1	2

=== Group B ===
- Al Ittihad
- Al Wahda
- Al Urouba

=== Group C ===
- Khaleej Sirte
- Al Ahly Benghazi
- Nojom Ajdabiya
- Al Tahaddy

=== Group D ===
- Al Akhdar
- Al Suqoor
- Al Nasr
