= Mohamed Al-Takbali =

Libyan association football player (born 1999)

Personal information
- Full name: Mohamed Al-Hadi Al-Basheer Saeid Al-Takbali
- Date of birth: 12 April 1999 (age 27)
- Place of birth: Tripoli, Libya
- Height: 1.74 m (5 ft 9 in)
- Position: Centre-back

Team information
- Current team: Al-Madina

Youth career
- 2008–2017: Al-Majd

Senior career*
Years	Team	Apps	(Gls)
2017–2019	Al-Majd		
2019–2021	Métlaoui	23	(0)
2021–2022	Al Ahli Tripoli		
2022–2023	Abu Salim		
2023–2024	Hidd		
2024	Asswehly		
2024–2025	Abu Salim	11	(0)
2025–	Al-Madina	13	(0)

International career
- Libya U17
2024–	Libya	4	(0)
- * Club domestic league appearances and goals as of 14:48, 1 September 2026 (UTC)

Mohamed Al-Hadi Al-Basheer Saeid Al-Takbali (Arabic: محمد الهادي البشير سعيد التكبالي; born 12 April 1999) is a Libyan footballer who currently plays as a defender for Al-Madina.

== Club career ==
Born in Tripoli, Al-Takbali began his footballing career in 2008 with Al-Majd, where he stayed for eleven years before a move to Tunisia to join Métlaoui in September 2019. Despite a slow start to his first season, making three appearances, he established himself as a first-team player the following year.

He returned to Libya in 2021, joining Libyan Premier League club Al Ahli Tripoli on a three-year contract. Despite this, he left the following year to join Abu Salim. A stint with Bahraini side Hidd followed the next year. After a short spell with Asswehly, Al-Takbali returned to Abu Salim ahead of the 2024–25 season.

== Career statistics ==
=== Club ===
As of 28 March 2025.

Club	Season	League			Cup		Continental		Other		Total	
Club	Season	Division	Apps	Goals	Apps	Goals	Apps	Goals	Apps	Goals	Apps	Goals
Métlaoui	2019–20	CLP-1	3	0	0	0	0	0	0	0	3	0
Métlaoui	2020–21	CLP-1	20	0	3 (Note: Appearances in the Tunisian Cup)	0	0	0	0	0	23	0
Métlaoui	Total		23	0	3	0	0	0	0	0	26	0
Abu Salim	2024–25	Libyan Premier League	11	0	0	0	–		0	0	11	0
Al-Madina	2025–26	Libyan Premier League	13	0	0	0	–		0	0	13	0
Career total			47	0	3	0	0	0	0	0	50	0

=== International ===
National team	Year	Apps	Goals
Libya	2024	4	0
Libya	2025	0	0
Total		4	0
