= 2007 Libyan Super Cup =

11th season of the Libyan SuperCup

Al Ittihad	Al Akhdar
3	1
- After extra time
- Date: 9 February 2008
- Venue: 11 June Stadium, Tripoli
- Referee: Mohammad al Zallawi

The 2007 Libyan SuperCup took place between 2006–07 Libyan Premier League champions Al Ittihad and the 2007 Libyan Cup runners-up Al Akhdar (Al Ittihad won the Libyan Cup, so Al Akhdar took their place in the competition as cup runners-up). This was the 11th edition of the competition, and the match ended 3–1 to Al Ittihad after extra time. This was Al Ittihad's 6th consecutive win in the competition.

== Match details ==
9 February 2008
17:00 EET

Al Ittihad	3–1 (a.e.t.)	Al Akhdar
Mohammad Sadik Coubageat 63'; Mohammad Za'abia 117', 120'		Khalifa al Meer 17'; Joseph Fausto (red card) 45+1'; Hisham al Ahmar (red card) 90+2'

11 June Stadium
Referee: (Libya) Mohammad al Zallawi
