= Nader Bushnaf =

Libyan lawyer and legal academic

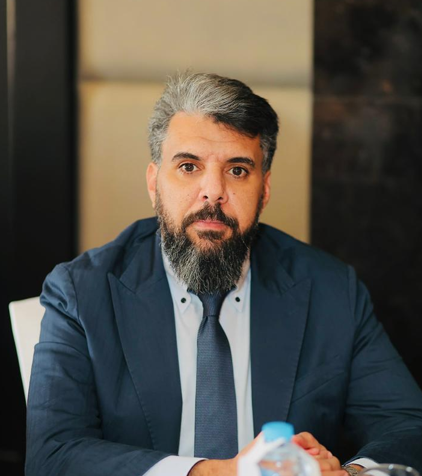
- NaderBushnaf in 2024.
- Born: June 10, 1982 (age 44); Benghazi, Libya
- Occupations: Lawyer, academic, legal consultant

Nader Bushnaf (Arabic: نادر بوشناف) is a Libyan lawyer, academic, and legal consultant. He is the founder of the Bushnaf Law Firm & Associates, based in Benghazi, Libya, and served as president of Al-Hilal SC (Benghazi).

== Early life and education ==
Bushnaf comes from a family with a long history in Libya’s legal and legislative fields. His grandfather, Khalifa Al-Gharyani Bushnaf, was appointed as a Sharia judge in Al-Marj in 1945 and later served on the Legislative Council of the Cyrenaica Province. His father, Ibrahim Khalifa Bushnaf, began his career as a public prosecution officer around 1980 and later held senior positions including President of the State Security Court, Minister of Interior, and National Security Adviser.

Bushnaf obtained an LL.M. in Public International Law from the International Islamic University Malaysia and is reportedly pursuing doctoral studies in international law.

== Legal and academic career ==
Bushnaf founded Bushnaf Law Firm & Associates (also styled *Bushnaf & Associates*) in Benghazi. According to the firm’s website, it specialises in commercial and corporate law in commercial and corporate law, oil & gas and energy law, banking and finance regulation, arbitration and dispute resolution, and international business investment across Libya and the wider MENA region.

The firm states that Bushnaf has worked in judiciary, prosecution, and legal advisory roles for more than two decades. He has reportedly served as Head of the Rights & Freedoms Committee of the Benghazi Bar Association and has taught Public International Law and International Relations at Libyan universities.

Bushnaf has authored works on Libyan banking and sports law. and provides legal consulting for cross-border commercial matters.

== Public roles and affiliations ==
Bushnaf is cited as participating in legal committees focused on rights, freedoms, and legal reform under the Benghazi Bar Association. His firm serves both local and foreign entities operating in Libya’s private sector.

== Sports administration role ==
In addition to his legal career, Bushnaf was appointed president of Al-Hilal SC (Benghazi), under whose leadership the club announced plans to develop its sporting infrastructure and youth sector.

== Personal life and family ==
The Bushnaf family has been active in Libya’s legal system for several generations from the mid-20th-century judicial service of Khalifa Al-Gharyani Bushnaf, to the ministerial and security roles of Ibrahim Bushnaf, and to Nader’s own work in legal practice and academia.

== Selected works and contributions ==
- Publications on Libyan banking law and sports law (details pending verification).
- Teaching roles in Public International Law and International Relations at Libyan universities (specific institutions and dates pending verification).

== See also ==
- Law of Libya
- Al Hilal SC (Benghazi)
