= Ahmed Krawa'a =

Libyan footballer (born 1989)

Ahmed Krawa'a احمد كراوع
Personal information
- Full name: Ahmed Mohammed Rajab Kraouaa
- Date of birth: 21 April 1989 (age 37)
- Place of birth: Tripoli, Libya
- Height: 1.76 m (5 ft 9 in)
- Position: Forward

Team information
- Current team: Al Ahli Tripoli
- Number: 11

Senior career*
Years	Team	Apps	(Gls)
2007–2008	Aschat SC		
2008–2009	Al-Ittihad SC		
2009	→ Al Tarsana SC (loan)		
2010–2016	Al-Tahaddi SC		
2017–2019	Al-Ahly Benghazi		
2019	Croissant Chebbien	7	(0)
2020–2022	Al Ahli Tripoli		
2022–2023	Al-Ahly Benghazi		
2023–	Al Ahli Tripoli	23	(13)

International career^{‡}
2009–	Libya	20	(7)
- * Club domestic league appearances and goals ‡ National team caps and goals as of 25 March 2025

Ahmed Mohammed Rajab Kraouaa (Arabic: احمد كراوع) (born 21 April 1989) is a Libyan professional footballer who plays as a forward for Libyan Premier League club Al Ahli Tripoli.

== Club career ==
=== Ittihad Tripoli ===
A promising young striker, Krawa'a was signed by Ittihad Tripoli in January 2008. Though he received few opportunities in the first team, he managed to get two goals, including an 87th-minute equaliser in a 1–1 draw against his former club, Shat.

=== Al Tarsana ===
Al Tarsana loaned Krawa'a during the summer transfer window. He has so far impressed at the capital club; his first two goals were against his employers in the 2009 Libyan Super Cup defeat. He haunted Shat again in the league when he struck against them in the derby match, with a dramatic 93rd-minute equaliser. He has since scored in each round of matches (as of Round 6), apart from the 2–0 defeat to Khaleej Sirte. He so far has 6 goals in 6 league games, and was the top scorer at the mid-season break, with 10 goals.

As Al Tarsana embarked on their first continental competition in 2009–10, Krawa'a scored The Arsenal's first goal in a CAF competition, calmly converting a 95th-minute penalty against CR Belouizdad to earn his side a first-leg 1–1 draw.

== International career ==
On 5 October 2009, Krawa'a made his debut for the Libyan national team in a friendly match against Kuwait. He managed to grab an 88th-minute equaliser, hence scoring on his international debut.

== Career statistics ==
=== International ===
Scores and results list Libya's goal tally first.

No	Date	Venue	Opponent	Score	Result	Competition
1.	5 October 2009	El-Shams Stadium, Heliopolis, Egypt	Kuwait	1–1	1–1	Friendly
2.	17 November 2023	Mbombela Stadium, Mbombela, South Africa	Eswatini	1–0	1–0	2026 FIFA World Cup qualification
3.	2 January 2024	Mardan Sports Complex, Antalya, Turkey	Indonesia	1–0	4–0	Friendly
4.	5 January 2024	Mardan Sports Complex, Antalya, Turkey	Indonesia	2–1	2–1	Friendly
5.	26 March 2024	Père Jégo Stadium, Casablanca, Morocco	Togo	1–0	1–1	Friendly
6.	6 June 2024	Martyrs of February Stadium, Benina, Libya	Mauritius	2–1	2–1	2026 FIFA World Cup qualification
7.	31 August 2024	Tripoli Stadium, Tripoli, Libya	Botswana	1–0	1–0	Friendly

== Honours ==
Individual

- Libyan Premier League 2017-18, Libyan Premier League 2022-23 :top goalscorer
