= Benghazi International Stadium =

Stadium in Benghazi, Libya

Coordinates: 32°6′6.5″N 20°4′20.7″E

- ملعب بنغازي الدولي
- Fans await a friendly between Inter Milan and Atletico Madrid
- Interactive map of Benghazi International Stadium
- Former names: March 28 Stadium
- Location: Benghazi, Libya
- Capacity: 42,000
- Surface: GrassMaster
- Field size: 72 metres (79 yd) by 107 metres (117 yd)

Construction
- Opened: 1970
- Renovated: 2025

Tenant
- Libya national football team

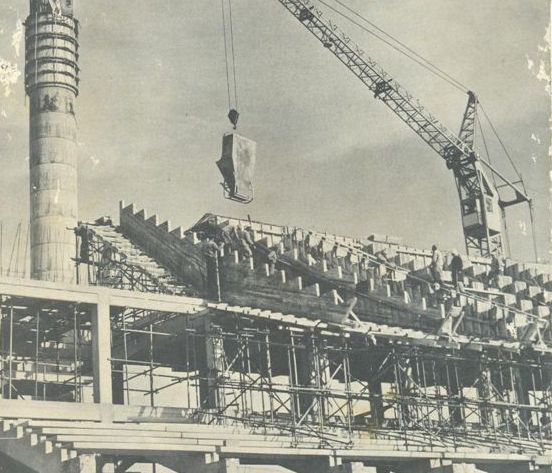
Construction work at the stadium in 1967.

Benghazi International Stadium (Arabic: ملعب بنغازي الدولي) is a multi-purpose stadium in Benghazi, Libya, also known as Sports City Stadium. It is a part of Benghazi Sports City, used mostly for football matches and also has athletics facilities. The stadium holds 42,000 spectators. It is sometimes used by the Libya national football team, although it is not as popular as a football stadium as the Tripoli Stadium.

Its old name of the stadium commemorates 28 March, when British forces were asked to relinquish their military base rights in Libya and leave the country.

Along with then-called June 11 Stadium, the 28 March Stadium hosted many games, including a semi-final, of the 1982 African Cup of Nations, held in Libya.

== New stadium ==
An artist's impression of the new stadium exterior.

Benghazi's main football stadium under renovation as of October 2024.

In 2013, the stadium had been closed and demolition work had begun for the construction of a new stadium. The new stadium will be an 85,000 all-seater stadium. Thomas Phifer and Partners, a New York-based architectural firm won the international competition for its design. The construction work is part of a general restructuring of the entire Medina al-Riyadhia (Sports City) site in honour of the Libyan multi-millionaire owner Musbah for saving the club from all its debts. Work was expected to be finished in time for Libya's hosting of the 2017 Africa Cup of Nations, until the tournament was cancelled in August 2014. While construction has been taking place, Benghazi's football clubs have been using the Martyrs of February Stadium.

On 10 October 2025, Inter Milan and Atlético Madrid competed at the remodelled stadium for the Reconstruction Cup, a friendly match underwritten by the Libyan Development and Reconstruction Fund (FDRL).
