= Murbat Stadium =

Sports venue in Misrata, Libya

- Misrata Football Arena
- Interactive map of Murbat Stadium
- Location: Misrata, Libya
- Coordinates: 32°24′27″N 15°4′19″E
- Capacity: 21,442

Website
- www.triarena.com

Murbat Stadium is a stadium currently under construction in Misrata, Libya. It is to become a venue for the 2017 Africa Cup of Nations.
