= Wadi Al Rabi Stadium =

Sports venue in Tripoli, Libya

- Location: Tripoli, Libya
- Capacity: 50,000

Wadi Al Rabi Stadium is a stadium currently under construction in Tripoli, Libya. It was planned to become a venue for the 2017 Africa Cup of Nations, where it would host the opening match and the final.
