= Anwar Al-Abyar =

Libyan football club

Al-Anwar
- Full name: Al-Anwar Sports Club
- Founded: 1960
- League: Libyan Premier League

Al-Anwar (Arabic: الأنوار) is a Libyan football club based in Al-Abyar which plays in the Libyan Premier League.
