= Wefaq Sabratha =

Libyan football club

- Full name: نادى الوفاق الرياضي الثقافي الاجتماعي بصبراته:Wefaq Sporting, Social and Cultural Club of Sabratha
- Founded: 1957
- Ground: Sabratha Stadium, Sabratha, Libya
- Capacity: 8,000
- Manager: (Libya) Redha Attia
- League: Libyan Premier League
- 2007–08: 3rd, Group A (promoted via Relegation Play-Off)
Home colours	Away colours

Wefaq Sabratha (وفاق صبراته) is a Libyan football club based in Sabratha, Libya.

During the 2006/07 season, Wefaq finished 3rd in Group A of the Libyan Second Division. The club had participated in the Libyan Premier League from the 2001/02 season until the 2005/06 season, at which point the club was relegated for finishing at the bottom of the league. During season 2007/2008, Wefaq came second in Group A of the Libyan Second Division, and gained promotion to the LPL via the Relegation Play-Off League.

== Honours ==
- Play-Off – 2007–08

== 2008–09 season ==
=== Current squad ===
As of April 30, 2009 Note: Flags indicate national team as defined under FIFA eligibility rules; some limited exceptions apply. Players may hold more than one non-FIFA nationality.

No.	Pos.	Nation	Player
1	FW	LBY	Mansour Abdallah Mohammad Ajalah
2	DF	LBY	Tariq Nasr Al Mabrouk Al Jmal
3	DF	LBY	Walid Ali Osman
4	DF	CIV	Anu Kofi Maxim
5	MF	MAR	Tariq Hadi Al Ashab
6	MF	CIV	Jeri Eimére
8	MF	LBY	Kheiri Saad Abdallah Al Makhlouf
9	FW	LBY	Hani Abdulrazzaq Ali Al Sharif
10	FW	CIV	N'Dri Stefan de Paul
11	FW	LBY	Ya'qoub Abdallah Mohammad Ibrahim
12	GK	LBY	Mohammad Al Hadi Ali Masoud
13	DF	LBY	Hatim Abdallah Ibrahim

No.	Pos.	Nation	Player
14	MF	NGA	Kareem Koladé Murtadha
15	FW	LBY	Haitham Abdulrazzaq Ali Al Sharif
16	MF	LBY	Mohammad Mahmoud Ali Al Boudy
17	FW	LBY	Hesham Ali Salim Al Khuwaildy
18	FW	LBY	Akram Zidan Ahmad Al Azzabi
19	DF	LBY	Mohammad Ahmad Bashir Al Mazoughi
20	DF	LBY	Saeed Saeed Ali Al Kayikh
21	GK	LBY	Dhafir Al Tahir Al Hadi Midaan
23	DF	LBY	Mohammad Abdusalam Salim Al Benghazi
24	DF	LBY	Osama Ibrahim Abdulhadi Zaqlaam
25	GK	LBY	Ahmad Abdulhadi Ali Al Habeel

== Backroom staff ==
Position	Name
Manager	(Tunisia) Tariq Bin Abdallah Al Thabit
Assistant manager	(Libya) Khalid Mansour Al Husseiny
Goalkeeping coach	(Libya) Hadi Mohammad Al Swai'i Sabitah
Fitness coach	(Libya) Anees Al Baaz

=== Results by Round ===
Round	1	2	3	4	5	6	7	8	9	10	11	12	13	14	15	16	17	18	19	20	21	22	23	24	25	26	27	28	29	30
Ground	H	H	A	H	A	H	A	H	A	A	H	A	H																	
Result	D	L	D	W	D	W	D	L		D																				
Position	10	11	13	8	12	7	7	10	12	12																				

Source: kooora.com
A = Away; H = Home; W = Win; D = Draw; L = Loss
