= Al Kremiah Stadium =

Sports venue in Tripoli, Libya

- Tripoli Arena
- Interactive map of Al Kremiah Stadium
- Location: Tripoli, Libya
- Coordinates: 32°44′38″N 13°06′01″E
- Capacity: 25,000

Al Kremiah Stadium is a stadium under construction in Tripoli, Libya. It was to become a venue for the 2017 Africa Cup of Nations. However, due to the Libyan Civil War the country withdrew as hosts. The CAF awarded the competition to Gabon, and Libya was barred from hosting AFCON.

Al Kremiah is one of the few Libyan stadiums to receive continuous construction after the Libyan Civil War, reaching ~50% completion in 2021.
