= Libya Development and Reconstruction Fund =

Public government body in Libya

The Libya Development and Reconstruction Fund is a public government body in Libya, established by Decision No. (1) of 2024 by the House of Representatives. Its mission is to implement reconstruction and development plans for Libyan cities and villages, with its headquarters in Benghazi.

== Tasks and objectives ==
The Fund aims to achieve the following purposes:

- Implement reconstruction projects in targeted cities and areas.
- Address the effects of Storm Daniel, which struck the city of Derna and the Green Mountain regions in September 2023.
- Cooperate with local and international expertise houses and consulting firms to develop urban plans.

== Administration ==
The Fund is managed by a Director General (currently held by Belqasim Haftar), and two deputies, appointed by a decision from the Presidency of the House of Representatives based on a proposal from the Prime Minister.
