= 2008 Libyan Super Cup =

Al Ittihad	Khaleej Sirte
4	0
- Date: 16 October 2008
- Venue: 11 June Stadium, Tripoli
- Referee: Jamaal Ombaya

The 2008 Libyan Super Cup was a match that took place on Wednesday, 15 October 2008 between the Libyan Premier League winners Al Ittihad and Libyan Cup winners Khaleej Sirte. The Super Cup is always the curtain raiser prior to the LPL season. Al Ittihad ran out 4–0 winners at the 11 June Stadium. After this win, Al Ittihad have now won the last six Super Cup titles, from 2002 onwards.

== Match details ==
2008-10-16
15:00 CET

Al Ittihad	4 – 0	Khaleej Sirte
Za'abia 23', 48'; Mhadeb 60', 72'	(Report) (in Arabic)

11 June Stadium
Attendance: 60,000
Referee: Jamaal Ombaya
