= Al Akhdar =

- Village
- Location in Oman
- Coordinates: 23°13′N 56°28′E
- Country: Oman
- Region: Ad Dhahirah Region
- Time zone: UTC+4 (Oman Standard Time)

Al Akhdar is a village in Ad Dhahirah Region, in northeastern Oman. It lies just to the northwest of the regional capital of Ibri along Highway 21. The village contains a post office and has been assigned the postcode 516.
