= Ajaylat Stadium =

Multi-purpose stadium

Coordinates: 32.8598°N 13.1358°E

Ajaylat Stadium is a multi-purpose stadium in Ajaylat, Libya. It is currently used mostly for football matches and is the home ground of Al Urouba. The stadium holds 8,000 people. This season (Libyan Premier League 2008/2009), Wefaq Sabratha will be playing there while their stadium (Sabratha Stadium) is under maintenance.
