= Libyan League Cup =

Libyan football competition

- Founded: 2007
- Region: Libya
- Teams: 14
- Current champions: Al-Madina (2009-10)
- Most championships: Khaleej Sirte, Ittihad, Al-Madina - 1 title
- 2009–10 Libyan League Cup

The Libyan League Cup is a Libyan football competition initiated in 2007. The competition sees all members in the Libyan Premier League compete for the trophy. The competition is aimed at giving youth team players and fringe players game time.

== 2007-08 Edition ==
Khaleej Sirte won the first edition of the competition, beating Al Akhdar 3-2 in last year's final.

== 2008-09 Edition ==
Al-Ittihad won the second edition.

== 2009-10 Edition ==
Al-Madina won the third edition.
