= Sheikh Chadae Stadium =

Sports venue in Bayda, Libya

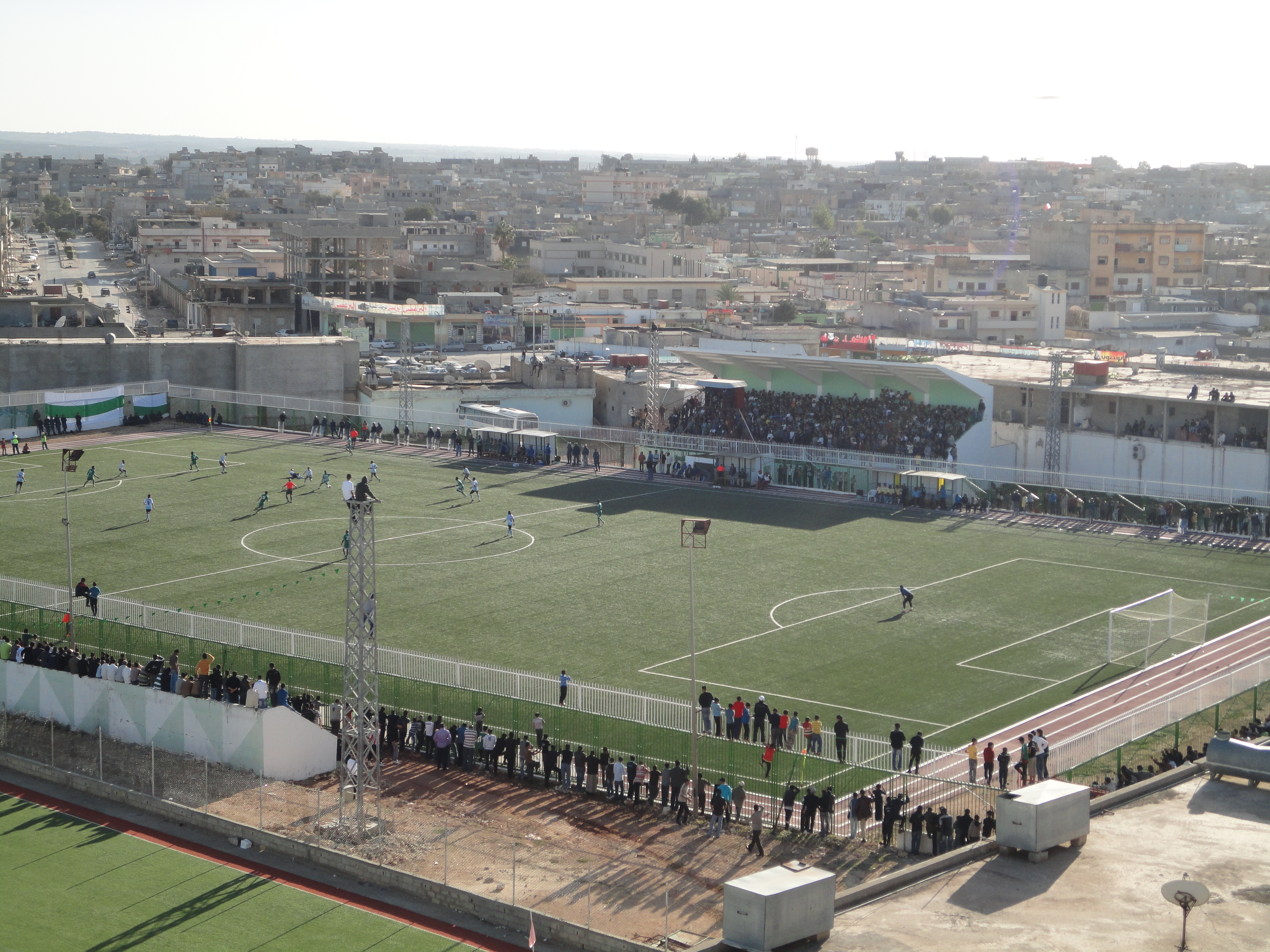
- Interactive map of Sheikh Chadae Stadium
- Location: Bayda, Libya
- Coordinates: 32°45′37.37″N 21°44′31.56″E
- Operator: Akhdar
- Capacity: 7,000 to 10,000

Construction
- Opened: 1974

Sheikh Chadae Stadium or Stadium Club Al Akhdar, (Arabic: ملعب شيخ الشهداء) or is a multi-purpose stadium in Bayda, Libya. It is currently used mostly for football matches and is the home ground of Al Akhdar Al Bayda'. The stadium holds 7,000 people, and sometimes up to 10,000 people.
