= First Statement Stadium =

Multi-purpose stadium in Benghazi, Libya

First Statement Stadium (Arabic: ملعب البيان الأول) is a multi-purpose stadium in Benghazi, Libya. Built in 2008, it is currently used mostly for football matches and is the home ground of numerous clubs in the city. The stadium's capacity is 9,000 spectators, and it measures 68 m (223 ft) by 105 m (344 ft).
