= Shahhat =

Shahat شحات
- Town
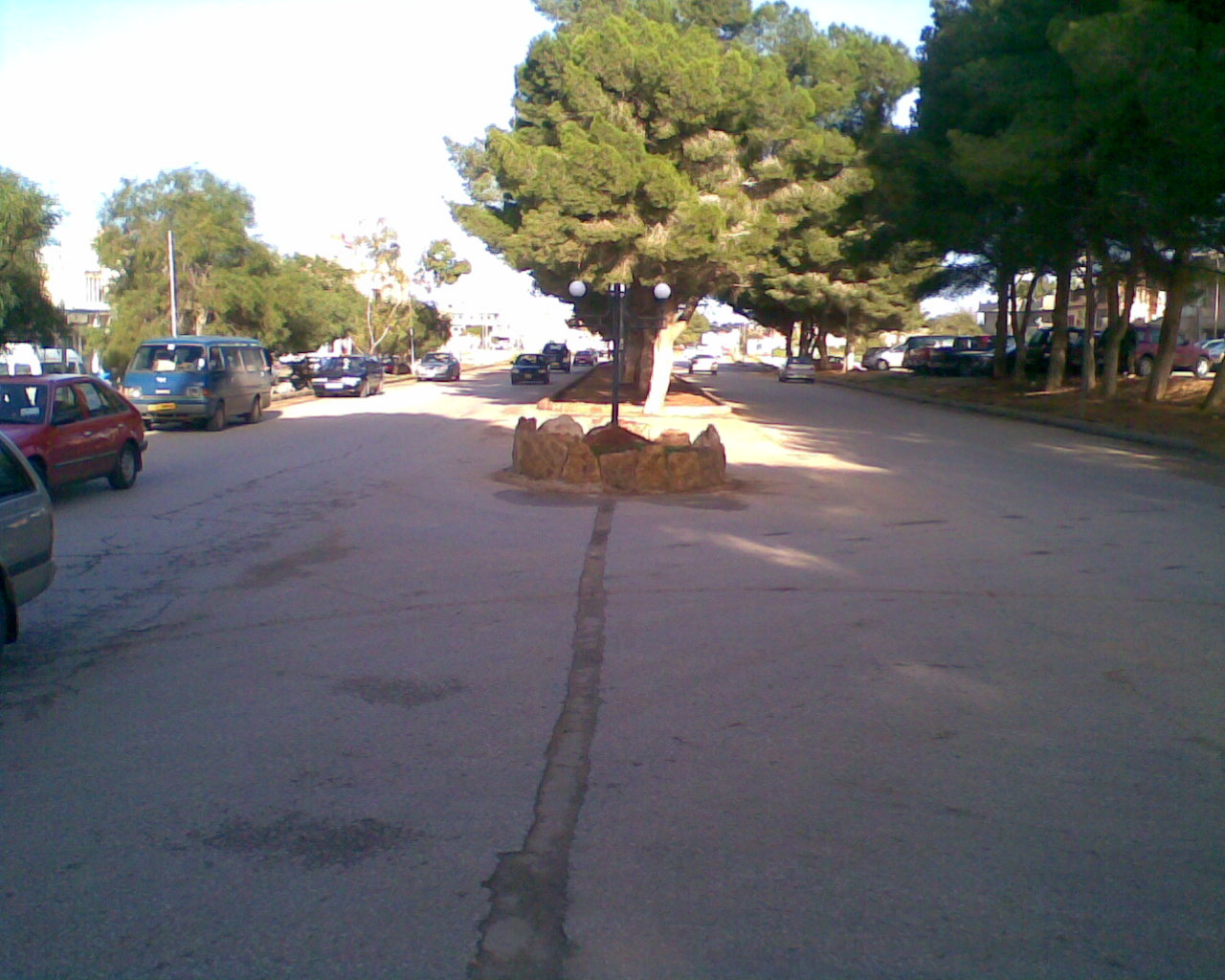

- Location in Libya
- Coordinates: 32°49′40″N 21°51′44″E
- Country: Libya
- Region: Cyrenaica
- District: Jabal al Akhdar
- Elevation: 1,683 ft (513 m)

Population (2004)
  - Total: 43,376
- Time zone: UTC +2
- License Plate Code: 35

Shahhat or Shahat (Arabic: شحات, Shaḥāt) is a town in the District of Jabal al Akhdar in northeastern Libya on the Mediterranean coast. It is located 24 km (15 mi) east of Bayda.

== History ==
The ancient and medieval city of Cyrene was located nearby.

During the Libyan Civil War, the city was one of the first to fall under rebel control.

== Transport ==
Shahhat is linked with Derna by two roads, the inner road running through Al Qubah is part of the Libyan Coastal Highway and the coastal road running through Susa and Ras al Helal.

== Climate ==
Climate data for Shahhat
Month	Jan	Feb	Mar	Apr	May	Jun	Jul	Aug	Sep	Oct	Nov	Dec	Year
Mean daily maximum °C (°F)	12.7 (54.9)	13.7 (56.7)	15.7 (60.3)	19.6 (67.3)	23.8 (74.8)	27.5 (81.5)	27.7 (81.9)	27.8 (82.0)	25.2 (77.4)	22.2 (72.0)	19.4 (66.9)	14.8 (58.6)	20.8 (69.4)
Daily mean °C (°F)	9.4 (48.9)	9.9 (49.8)	11.4 (52.5)	14.5 (58.1)	18.5 (65.3)	21.9 (71.4)	22.7 (72.9)	23.1 (73.6)	21.3 (70.3)	18.1 (64.6)	14.8 (58.6)	11.0 (51.8)	16.4 (61.5)
Mean daily minimum °C (°F)	6.5 (43.7)	6.7 (44.1)	7.8 (46.0)	9.8 (49.6)	12.8 (55.0)	16.6 (61.9)	17.9 (64.2)	18.3 (64.9)	16.3 (61.3)	14.3 (57.7)	11.7 (53.1)	8.2 (46.8)	12.2 (54.0)
Average precipitation mm (inches)	132 (5.2)	82 (3.2)	65 (2.6)	24 (0.9)	9 (0.4)	2 (0.1)	1 (0.0)	2 (0.1)	11 (0.4)	60 (2.4)	68 (2.7)	113 (4.4)	569 (22.4)
Average relative humidity (%)	77	73	72	64	57	54	63	65	69	69	69	74	67
Source: Arab Meteorology Book

== See also ==
- List of cities in Libya
