= Alamn Alaam =

Libyan football club

Al-Amn Al-Aam
- Full name: Ittihad Al-Amn Al-Aam (English: Public Security United)
- Founded: 1957
- Ground: The Industrial River Stadium; Tripoli, Libya
- Capacity: 15,000
- League: Libyan Premier League
- 2007–08: Group B, 1st – Promoted

The Police, known as Al-Amn Al-Aam from the 2008/2009 season, (Arabic: الأمن العام);(English: Public Security) is a Libyan football club based in Tripoli, Libya. The club was founded in 1957 as Aschourta (The Police) but changed its name to Ittihad Al-Amn Al-Aam (Public Security United) in 2007. The club was promoted from the Libyan Second Division last season, having finished 1st in Group B last year. In 2008–09, the club was relegated and it is expected that leading players will leave the club. Juan Ramirez Cuzo became the first player to leave the club in the summer of 2009.
