= Al Ittihad Misurata SC =

Libyan association football club

Al-Ittihad Misurata
- Full name: Al-Ittihad Misurata Sports Club
- Founded: 1965; 61 years ago
- Ground: Misurata Stadium; Misurata, Libya
- Capacity: 10,000
- League: Libyan Premier League
Home colours	Away colours

Al-Ittihad (Arabic: الإتحاد) is a Libyan professional football club based in Misurata, western Libya. They play their home games at Misurata Stadium. The club's home colours are green and white. The club was founded on August 15, 1965.
