= Al Hilal Benghazi SC =

Libyan football club

Al-Hilal SCSC
- Full name: Al-Hilal Sports Cultural & Social Club
- Nickname: Hila-Hop
- Founded: 23 March 1952; 74 years ago
- Ground: Martyrs of February Stadium, Benina, Libya
- Capacity: 10,550
- Chairman: Nader Bushnaf
- Manager: Tarek Thabet
- League: Libyan Premier League
- 2023–24: 4th
Home colours

Al-Hilal Sports Cultural & Social Club (Arabic: نادي الهلال الرياضي الثقافي الاجتماعي) also known as Al-Hilal Benghazi is a Libyan professional association football club based in Benghazi, Libya, that competes in the Libyan Premier League.

The club has witnessed huge development milestones in terms of infrastructure, strategic development plans and marketing under the leadership of the new board of directors (Nader Bushnaf) and the sports director Hossamedin Bedier.

Bedier joined Al Hilal SC, as one of the biggest clubs in Libya. and became the youngest director of sports development in Africa. This role was also in the difficult postwar context of the country.

Former logo

Current logo

== Honours ==
- Libyan Premier League

Runners-up (2): 1964–65, 2000

- Libyan Cup

Winners (1): 2000–02
Runners-up (4): 1976–77, 1997–98, 2003–04, 2016-17, 2017-18

== Performance in CAF competitions ==
- CAF Cup Winners' Cup: 2 appearances

2001 – First Round
2003 – Second Round

== Current players ==
(in alphabetical order by surname)

- (Libya) Faisal Al Badri
- (Libya) Hossam Anbieh
- (Mauritania) Hemeya Tanjy

== Basketball team ==
Al-Hilal SC has a basketball team that competes in the Libyan Division I Basketball League.
