= Misurata Stadium =

Football stadium in Misrata, Libya

Misrata Stadium
- Interactive map of Misrata Stadium
- Location: Misrata, Libya
- Coordinates: 32°21′48″N 15°2′45″E
- Operator: Asswehly, Alittihad
- Capacity: 10,000

Misrata Stadium is a football stadium in the city of Misrata, in northwestern Libya. It was the previous home of the Libyan national team and hosted some of the country's 2006 World cup qualifiers, most notably against Cameroon, where they held the Indomitable Lions to a 0-0 draw.

The stadium is the home of Asswehly, but also hosts matches that involve Misrata's other clubs, such as Alittihad.

The stadium has a capacity of 10,000.
