= Benina =

Suburb in Benghazi, Libya

Benina بنينا
- Basic People's Congress division
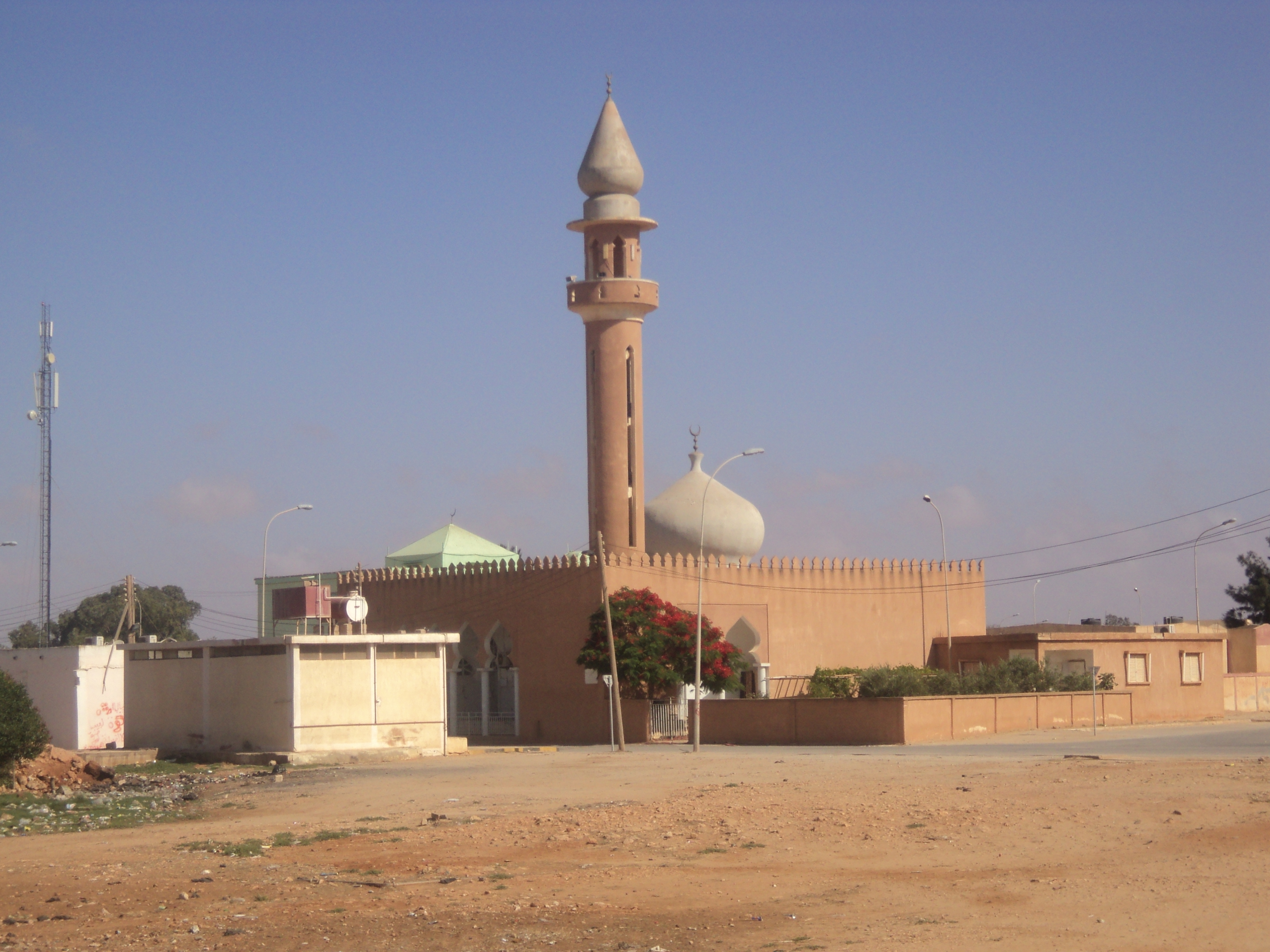
- A mosque in Benina

- Location in Libya
- Coordinates: 32.0773384°N 20.2574158°E
- Country: Libya
- Region: Cyrenaica
- District: Benghazi
- Time zone: UTC+2 (EET)

Benina is a suburban borough ( formerly Basic People's Congress) and an administrative division of Benghazi, Libya. It contains the Benina International Airport. Benina contains at least 5 mosques and Benghazi International Airport. It is also the location for the Benina Martyrs Football Stadium which is open for international games as certified by CAF
