= Khaleej Sirte SC =

Association football club in Libya

Khaleej Sirte
- Full name: Khaleej Sirte
- Founded: 5 May 1963; 62 years ago
- Ground: 2 March Stadium; Sirte, Libya
- Capacity: 2,000
- Manager: Tariq Thabit
- League: Libyan First Division
- 2023–24: Libyan First Division , 2nd

Khaleej Sirte is a Libyan football club based in Sirte, Libya. They play in the Libyan first division . They play their home matches at the 2 March Stadium in Sirte. The stadium holds around 2,000 people.

== History ==
Sirte was founded on 5 May 1963. It continued under this name, and on 29 July 1999, the two other clubs in Sirte, Al-Najm Al-Sate and Al-Intilaaq, merged to form Khaleej Sirte

== Recent years ==
Having gained promotion to the Premier League in 2005–06, they managed to stay up in their first season, achieving a 7th-place finish. They finished 5th in 2007–08, and manager Abdulhafeedh Arbeesh managed to guide the club to their first pieces of silverware, the Libyan League Cup and the Libyan Cup, after a 1–0 win over Madina.

They therefore gained qualification to the 2009 CAF Confederation Cup. After a 6–0 aggregate win over Tanzanian side Prisons FC in the first round, they were handed a tricky draw against Algerian giants ES Sétif. Having been narrowly defeated 1–0 in the home leg, they were crushed 5–0 in Sétif, as they bowed out to the eventual finalists. In the 2008 North African Cup Winners Cup, they were defeated 4–0 on aggregate by Moroccan side Maghreb Fez.

== Achievements ==
- Libyan Football Cup
  - Winners (1): 2008
- Libyan SuperCup
  - Runners-up (1): 2008
- Libyan League Cup
  - Winners (1): 2008

== Performance in CAF competitions ==
- CAF Confederation Cup: 1 appearance

2009 – First Round

== Coaching staff ==
Position	Name
Manager	(Tunisia) Mukhtar Taleely
Assistant manager	(Libya) Abdul 'Atee Qubay
Team doctor	(Libya) Mohammed Khalifa
