= Sirte Stadium =

Sports venue in Sirte, Libya

- Interactive map of Sirte Stadium
- Location: Sirte, Libya
- Coordinates: 31°11′37″N 16°35′52″E
- Operator: Khaleej Sirte
- Capacity: 2,000

Sirte Stadium is a multi-purpose stadium in Sirte, Libya. It is currently used mostly for football matches and is the home ground of Khaleej Sirte. The stadium holds 2,000 people.
