= Benina Martyrs Stadium =

Football stadium in Benina, Libya

- Interactive map of Benina Martyrs Stadium
- Location: Benina (east of Benghazi), Libya
- Coordinates: 32°4′48″N 20°15′42″E
- Owner: Libyan Football Federation
- Operator: Benghazi clubs
- Capacity: 10,550
- Surface: Artificial
- Field size: 68 metres (74 yd) by 105 metres (115 yd)

Construction
- Built: February 2008 – March 2009
- Opened: 5 March 2009

Tenants
- Al Ahly Benghazi; Al Hilal; Al Nasr; Libya national football team

Benina Martyrs Stadium (Arabic: ملعب شهداء بنينة), until 2011 officially named Hugo Chávez Football Stadium (Arabic: ملعب هوغو شافيز), is a Libyan football stadium located in Benina, a town 19 km east of Benghazi. The stadium was constructed by the same company that built the Brita-Arena in Germany. The stadium holds 10,550 people. This is Libya's first all-seater stadium. The stadium is used by most Benghazi clubs, and may be used by the national team as well. The surface of the pitch is artificial. The pitch's dimensions are 105m x 68m. The cost of construction of the stadium was around LYD 20 million.

== History ==
The stadium was originally named after Venezuelan president Hugo Chávez, due to Libyan leader Muammar Gaddafi's close friendship with him. However, following the Libyan Civil War, it was announced that the stadium had been renamed in honour of the so-called Martyrs of February, the people who were killed in fighting to gain control over Eastern Libya.

The stadium was opened on 5 March 2009, as the Libya U-23 team played the Syria U-23 in a friendly. A capacity crowd watched the match finish 2-1 to the Syrians, with Libya and Al Ahly Benghazi's Ihab Ghafir becoming the first player to score at the stadium, in the 28th minute.

The first goal to be scored at the new stadium in a competitive match was scored by Al Hilal's Alaa al Oujli in the 26th minute of their league match with Al Jazeera. The match ended 2-2.

The stadium was a confirmed venue for the 2017 Africa Cup of Nations before Libya's role as host of the tournament was cancelled in August 2014. The stadium hosted the national team's first game in Libya in eight years against Tunisia on 25 March 2021.
