= 2005–06 Libyan Premier League =

Libyan Premier League
- Season: 2005–06

The 2005–06 Libyan Premier League was the 39th edition of the Libyan Premier League, the top flight of Libyan football organised by the Libyan Football Federation.

== Competition ==
There were 18 clubs in the league for this season, split into two groups of nine. The nine teams in each group played each other home and away, resulting in 16 games being played in each group. The top three teams from each group progressed to the next stage, the 'Championship Play-Off'.

The champions, Al Ittihad, won their twelfth league title, and gained qualification to the CAF Champions League for the next season.

== Teams ==
=== Group A ===
Club	City	Stadium
Al Ahly Tripoli	Tripoli, Libya	11 June Stadium
Al Charara	Sabha, Libya	Sabha Stadium
Al Dhahra	Tripoli, Libya	GMR Stadium
Al Hilal	Benghazi, Libya	28 March Stadium
Al Ittihad	Tripoli, Libya	11 June Stadium
Al Madina	Tripoli, Libya	11 June Stadium
Al Mustaqbal	Tripoli, Libya	Al Jameel Stadium
Al Tahaddy	Benghazi, Libya	28 March Stadium
Rafik Sorman	Sorman, Libya	Rafik Sorman Stadium

=== Group B ===
Club	City	Stadium
Al Ahly Benghazi	Benghazi, Libya	28 March Stadium
Al Akhdar	Bayda, Libya	Al Bayda Stadium
Al Majd	Tripoli, Libya	GMR Stadium
Al Olympic	Zawiya, Libya	Al-Olympic Stadium
Al Shat	Tripoli, Libya	GMR Stadium
Al Swihli	Misrata, Libya	July 9 Stadium
Al Urouba	Ajaylat, Libya	GMR Stadium
Wefaq Sabratha	Sabratha, Libya	Ajaylat Stadium
Al Wahda	Tripoli, Libya	GMR Stadium

== Group tables ==
=== Group A ===
Pos	Team	Pld	W	D	L	GF	GA	GD	Pts	Qualification or relegation
1	Al Ahly Tripoli	16	12	3	1	28	6	+22	39	Progresses to Championship Stage
2	Al Ittihad	16	11	3	2	28	8	+20	36	Progresses to Championship Stage
3	Al Tahaddy	16	7	5	4	18	14	+4	26	Progresses to Championship Stage
4	Rafik Sorman	16	6	4	6	17	18	−1	22	Relegation Play-Off
5	Al Charara	16	5	5	6	8	15	−7	20	Relegation Play-Off
6	Al Hilal	16	4	7	5	12	11	+1	19	Relegation Play-Off
7	Al Madina	16	4	6	6	16	16	0	18	Relegation Play-Off
8	Al Mustaqbal	16	1	5	10	9	25	−16	8	Relegation Play-Off
9	Al Dhahra	16	1	4	11	4	27	−23	7	Relegated to 2006–07 Libyan Second Division

=== Group B ===
Pos	Team	Pld	W	D	L	GF	GA	GD	Pts	Qualification or relegation
1	Al Olympic	16	10	2	4	31	14	+17	32	Progresses to Championship Stage
2	Al Akhdar	16	9	4	3	28	16	+12	31	Progresses to Championship Stage
3	Al Ahly Benghazi	16	8	4	4	16	13	+3	28	Progresses to Championship Stage
4	Al Urouba	16	6	4	6	21	20	+1	22	Relegation Play-Off
5	Al Majd	16	4	6	6	12	17	−5	18	Relegation Play-Off
6	Al Shat	16	4	6	6	19	23	−4	18	Relegation Play-Off
7	Al Wahda	16	4	5	7	16	21	−5	17	Relegation Play-Off
8	Al Swihli	16	4	4	8	14	25	−11	16	Relegation Play-Off
9	Wefaq Sabratha	16	4	3	9	13	21	−8	15	Relegated to 2006–07 Libyan Second Division

== Championship stage ==
In this stage, the six clubs (3 from each group) that qualified played each other home & away. The team with the most points after the 10 games would be crowned champions. The two teams that finished first in their group, Al Olympic and Al Ahly Tripoli, received three bonus points to take through to this stage, while the two teams that finished second, Al Akhdar and Al Ittihad, received one bonus point.

== Final table ==
Pos	Team	Pld	W	D	L	GF	GA	GD	BP	Pts	Qualification
1	Al Ittihad	10	8	2	0	21	4	+17	1	27	CAF Champions League 2007; 12th League Title
2	Al Ahly Tripoli	10	7	3	0	15	4	+11	3	27	CAF Confederation Cup 2007 (Note: Al Ahly Tripoli qualify for CAF Confederation Cup as cup winners)
3	Al Akhdar	10	3	1	6	6	12	−6	0	10 (Note: 1 bonus point and 1 point deducted for abandonment of match)	
4	Al Tahaddy Benghazi	10	3	1	6	8	18	−10	0	10	
5	Al Olympic	10	1	4	5	3	6	−3	3	10	
6	Al Ahly Benghazi	10	2	1	7	7	16	−9	0	7	

== Relegation play-off ==
The 10 teams that finished 4th-8th in their respective groups: Rafik Sorman, Al Charara, Al Hilal, Al Madina, Al Mustaqbal, Al Urouba, Al Majd, Al Shat, Al Wahda and Al Swihli, along with the two teams that finished second in their respective groups in the Second Division this season, Al Harati and Al Soukour, altogether 12 teams, were split into two groups of 6 teams. The 6 teams in each group would play each other home & away, and the top three teams would play in the Libyan Premier League the next season. Premier League teams that finished fourth in their respective groups (Rafik Sorman and Al Urouba) received three bonus points, while teams that finished fifth in their respective groups (Al Majd and Al Charara) received one bonus point each.

=== Group tables ===
==== Group A ====
Pos	Team	Pld	W	D	L	GF	GA	GD	BP	Pts	Qualification or relegation
1	Rafik Sorman	10	5	2	3	13	12	+1	3	20	2006–07 Libyan Premier League
2	Al Soukour	10	6	1	3	9	7	+2	0	19	2006–07 Libyan Premier League
3	Al Hilal	10	5	3	2	16	7	+9	0	18	2006–07 Libyan Premier League
4	Al Wahda	10	5	3	2	15	10	+5	0	18	2006–07 Libyan Second Division
5	Al Mustaqbal	10	3	2	5	12	11	+1	0	11	2006–07 Libyan Second Division
6	Al Majd	10	0	1	9	7	25	−18	1	2	2006–07 Libyan Second Division

==== Group B ====
Pos	Team	Pld	W	D	L	GF	GA	GD	BP	Pts	Qualification or relegation
1	Al Charara	10	5	3	2	15	11	+4	1	19	2006–07 Libyan Premier League
2	Al Shat	10	5	2	3	15	12	+3	0	17	2006–07 Libyan Premier League
3	Al Madina	10	4	3	3	12	8	+4	0	15	2006–07 Libyan Premier League
4	Al Urouba	10	2	5	3	10	9	+1	3	14	2006–07 Libyan Second Division
5	Al Swihli	10	3	5	2	12	12	0	0	14	2006–07 Libyan Second Division
6	Al Harati	10	1	2	7	4	16	−12	0	5	2006–07 Libyan Second Division

== Top goalscorers ==
18 goals

- (Libya) Samir Al Wahaj (Al Wahda)

15 goals

- (Senegal) Omar Diop (Al Madina)

12 goals

- (Libya) Osama Fazzani (Al Ahly Tripoli)
- (Libya) Ahmed Saad (Al Ahly T.)
- (Libya) Nader Kara (Al Ahly Tripoli)
