= Abdulnaser Slil =

Libyan footballer (born 1981)

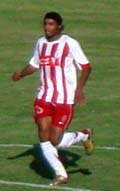
- Slil playing for Al-Ittihad Tripoli in September 2007

Personal information
- Date of birth: 2 September 1981 (age 45)
- Place of birth: Tripoli, Libya
- Height: 1.82 m (6 ft 0 in)
- Position: Midfielder

Youth career
- Al-Ittihad Tripoli

Senior career*
Years	Team	Apps	(Gls)
2000–2014	Al-Ittihad Tripoli	?	(?)

International career
2001–2011	Libya	19	(0)
- * Club domestic league appearances and goals

Abdulnaser Slil, also known as Abdul Nasser Slil, (Arabic: عبد الناصر صليل; born 2 September 1981) is a Libyan former footballer who played as a midfielder. He is a one-club player as he spent his entire club career with Libyan Premier League club Al-Ittihad Tripoli.

== Club career ==
Slil was born in Tripoli, Libya on 2 September 1981 and he joined the youth academy of Al-Ittihad Tripoli. He was promoted to the senior team ahead of the 2000–01 Libyan Premier League season and he debuted during the same season. During his time with the club, he won the Libyan Premier League on eight occasions, the Libyan Cup on four occasions, and the Libyan Super Cup on eight occasions.

He was part of the team which finished in third place at the 2007 CAF Champions League and third place at the 2010 CAF Confederation Cup. The 2010–11 Libyan Premier League was never completed, and the following two seasons were not held as a result of the First Libyan Civil War. Despite this, Slil returned to Al-Ittihad Tripoli to play one final season for the club during the 2013–14 season where they finished in second place. He retired in 2014.

== International career ==
Slil made his debut for Libya during the 4–2 loss against Zambia on 29 July 2001 during 2002 FIFA World Cup qualification. He then did not play for Libya until 2005 when he returned to international football against Malawi during a 1–1 friendly draw on 27 May 2005.

He was part of the Libya team which played at the 2006 Africa Cup of Nations but Slil only made one appearance at the tournament which was the 3–0 loss against Egypt on 20 January 2006; this was also the opening match of the tournament. He would then participate in 2008 Africa Cup of Nations qualification and 2010 FIFA World Cup qualification with Libya.

He helped Libya qualify for the 2012 Africa Cup of Nations but he retired from international football two months before the tournament began, with his last match for Libya being a 1–1 friendly draw against Belarus on 15 November 2011.

== Career statistics ==
=== Club ===
Only partial statistics are known.

Appearances and goals by club, season and competition
Club	Season	League		
Club	Season	Division	Apps	Goals
Al Ittihad Tripoli	2000–01	Libyan Premier League	?	?
Al Ittihad Tripoli	2001–02	Libyan Premier League	?	?
Al Ittihad Tripoli	2002–03	Libyan Premier League	?	?
Al Ittihad Tripoli	2003–04	Libyan Premier League	?	?
Al Ittihad Tripoli	2004–05	Libyan Premier League	?	?
Al Ittihad Tripoli	2005–06	Libyan Premier League	?	?
Al Ittihad Tripoli	2006–07	Libyan Premier League	?	?
Al Ittihad Tripoli	2007–08	Libyan Premier League	15	3
Al Ittihad Tripoli	2008–09	Libyan Premier League	10	2
Al Ittihad Tripoli	2009–10	Libyan Premier League	?	?
Al Ittihad Tripoli	2010–11	Libyan Premier League	?	?
Al Ittihad Tripoli	2011–12	Libyan Premier League	— (Note: League season not held due to the First Libyan Civil War.)	
Al Ittihad Tripoli	2012–13	Libyan Premier League	—	
Al Ittihad Tripoli	2013–14	Libyan Premier League	?	?
Career total			25+	5+

=== International ===
Appearances and goals by national team and year
National team	Year	Apps	Goals
Libya	2001	1	0
Libya	2002	0	0
Libya	2003	0	0
Libya	2004	0	0
Libya	2005	3	0
Libya	2006	7	0
Libya	2007	2	0
Libya	2008	1	0
Libya	2009	1	0
Libya	2010	2	0
Libya	2011	2	0
Total		19	0

== Honours ==
Al-Ittihad Tripoli

- Libyan Premier League: 2001–02, 2002–03, 2004–05, 2005–06, 2006–07, 2007–08, 2008–09, 2009–10; runner-up 2003–04, 2013–14
- Libyan Cup: 2003–04, 2004–05, 2006–07, 2008–09; runner-up 2001–02, 2002–03
- Libyan Super Cup: 2002, 2003, 2004, 2005, 2006, 2007, 2008, 2009, 2010
- CAF Champions League: third place 2007
- CAF Confederation Cup: third place 2010
