= 2003–04 Libyan Premier League =

Libyan Premier League
- Season: 2003–04
- Champions: Olympic Azzaweya
- Relegated: Al Charara (via Playoff); Wahda; Tersanah
- 2005 CAF Champions League: Olympic Azzaweya
- 2005 CAF Confederation Cup: Ittihad
- Matches: 182
- Top goalscorer: Ahmed Sa'ad (14)
- Biggest home win: Olomby 5–1 Hilal (2004-04-20)
- Biggest away win: Nasr 0–5 Olomby (2003-10-24)
- Highest scoring: Tahaddy 3–5 Olomby (2003-12-12); Ahly Tripoli 4–4 Nasr (2004-01-09); Sweahly 2–6 Nasr (2004-04-16)
- Longest winning run: Olympic Azzaweya (9 matches) (2003-09-26 – 2004-01-09)
- Longest unbeaten run: Olympic Azzaweya (13 matches)
- Longest losing run: Wahda (7 matches)

The 2003-04 Libyan Premier League was the 37th edition of Libyan top-flight football, organised by the Libyan Football Federation. History was made this season, as Olympic Azzaweya of Zawiya, became the first side outside of the two biggest cities in the country (Tripoli and Benghazi) to win the premier division. Their feat is yet to be beaten. They also prevented Ittihad from winning a treble of Libyan Premier League titles. This was the first time since that the Big Two had not won the league, since Mahalla achieved this in the 1998–99 season. Olympic Azzaweya have failed to come close to winning the league since, their best finish being 3rd in the 2004–05 season.

== Teams ==
Location of teams in 2003–04 Libyan Premier League

Club	City	Stadium
Ahly	Tripoli	11 June Stadium
Akhdar	Bayda	Green Document Stadium
Hilal	Benghazi	28 March Stadium
Al Ittihad	Tripoli	11 June Stadium
Madina	Tripoli	11 June Stadium
Nasr	Benghazi	28 March Stadium
Olympic Azzaweya	Zawiya	Zaawia Stadium
Al Charara	Sabha	Sabha Stadium
Sweahly	Misrata	9 July Stadium
Tahaddy	Benghazi	28 March Stadium
Tersanah	Tripoli	GMR Stadium
Wahda	Tripoli	GMR Stadium
Wefaq	Sabratha	Ajaylat Stadium
Rafik Sorman	Sorman	Sorman Stadium

== League table ==
Pos	Team	Pld	W	D	L	GF	GA	GD	Pts	Qualification or relegation
1	Olympic Azzaweya (C)	26	17	6	3	42	16	+26	57	2005 CAF Champions League
2	Ittihad	26	14	10	2	30	8	+22	52	2005 CAF Confederation Cup
3	Ahly Tripoli	26	15	7	4	38	20	+18	51 (Note: Ahly Tripoli and Sweahly deducted one point)	
4	Nasr	26	12	9	5	32	25	+7	45	
5	Hilal	26	11	9	6	30	24	+6	42	
6	Tahaddy	26	8	8	10	24	26	−2	32 (Note: THD 0–0 RFQ; RFQ 0–0 THD)	
7	Rafik Sorman	26	6	14	6	19	21	−2	32	
8	Madina	26	7	10	9	23	25	−2	31	
9	Akhdar	26	6	11	9	26	28	−2	29	
10	Wefaq Sabratha	26	6	8	12	17	23	−6	26 (Note: SWE 0–1 WFQ; WFQ 0–1 SWE)	
11	Sweahly	26	7	6	13	22	37	−15	26	
12	Sharrara (R)	26	5	10	11	28	36	−8	25	Qualification for Promotion/relegation playoff
13	Wahda (R)	26	4	6	16	17	38	−21	18	Relegation to 2004–05 Libyan Second Division
14	Tersanah (R)	26	2	10	14	17	38	−21	16	Relegation to 2004–05 Libyan Second Division

Source: RSSSF
Rules for classification: 1) points; 2) head-to-head points; 3) head-to-head goal difference; 4) head-to-head goals scored; 5) goal difference; 6) number of goals scored.
(C) Champions; (R) Relegated

== Results ==
Home \ Away	AHLT	AKH	HIL	ITT	MAD	NSR	OLY	RFK	SHR	SWE	THD	TER	WAH	WFQ
Ahly Tripoli		1–1	1–1	0–2	1–0	4–4	1–0	2–0	1–0	2–0	1–0	2–0	2–0	1–1
Akhdar	1–1		1–0	0–1	2–2	0–1	0–2	1–1	0–1	1–0	1–3	3–1	3–0	2–1
Hilal	1–0	1–1		1–0	1–2	3–2	0–1	0–0	2–1	3–0	0–0	3–1	2–1	0–0
Ittihad	1–0	3–1	1–0		1–1	1–1	0–2	1–1	2–1	0–0	3–0	2–0	0–0	2–0
Madina	0–2	0–0	1–1	0–0		1–2	1–2	0–1	2–1	0–1	0–0	1–1	2–0	0–1
Nasr	0–0	0–0	0–0	0–0	3–1		0–5	1–0	1–1	0–0	2–1	0–1	1–0	1–0
Olomby	2–3	1–0	5–1	0–1	2–0	1–0		0–0	1–1	2–0	1–0	1–1	1–1	1–0
Rafik Sorman	0–3	0–0	0–0	0–0	1–1	2–0	1–2		0–2	1–0	0–0	1–1	2–2	1–1
Sharrara	1–3	1–1	1–1	0–3	0–1	0–1	1–1	2–2		1–1	1–1	4–1	2–3	0–1
Sweahly	1–2	1–1	1–4	0–3	1–1	2–6	0–0	1–0	4–1		0–3	2–0	1–2	0–1
Tahaddy	2–0	1–0	1–3	0–0	0–0	0–1	3–5	0–0	0–1	1–3		2–0 (Note: Match awarded 2–0 to Tahaddy after Tersanah played a banned player.)	1–0	0–1
Tersanah	0–1	1–1	0–1	0–0	1–3	1–1	1–2	0–2	2–2	1–2	1–1		0–1	1–0
Wahda	2–4	1–3	0–1	0–2	0–2	1–2	0–1	0–2	0–1	1–0	1–2	0–0		1–1
Wefaq Sabratha	0–0	2–1	3–0	0–1	0–1	0–2	0–1	1–2	1–1	0–1	1–2	1–1	0–0	

Updated to match(es) played on unknown. Source: goalzz.com
Legend: Blue = home team win; Yellow = draw; Red = away team win.

== Golden Boot ==
- 14 goals
  - (Libya) Ahmad Saad - Al Nasr
- 13 goals
  - (Libya) Haitham Abu Shah - Al Akhdar
- 11 goals
  - (Guinea) Aleya Soumah Maneah - Al Olomby
- 10 goals
  - (Guinea) Mara Kaba Abdoulaye - Al Olomby
- 9 goals
  - (Libya) Ahmed al Masly - Al Ittihad
  - (Libya) Abdelhameed al Zidane - Al Charara

== Promotion/relegation playoff ==
This was played between the 3rd-placed side in the Libyan Second Division, Al Shat, and this season's 12th-placed side, Al Charara. The winner would compete in next season's Libyan Premier League, while the loser would compete in the 2004–05 Libyan Second Division.

May 21, 2004
17:00

Al Charara	1 – 1 (2 – 4 pen.)	Al Shat
Ahmed Ali Milaad 63'		Ahmed Abdelqadir 90+3'

28 March Stadium

Al Shat are therefore promoted to next season's Libyan Premier League.
