= 1993–94 Libyan Premier League =

Libyan Premier League
- Season: 1993–94

The 1993–94 Libyan Premier League was the 27th edition of the competition since its inception in 1963. Ahly Tripoli won their 7th league title by beating arch rivals Ittihad 1–0 in the Championship Playoff. The title was Ahly's first for ten seasons.

== Overview ==
The 21 participating teams were split into two groups, one of 11 teams, and the other of 10. The top team in each group would go through to a one-off match to decide the championship.

Ittihad won their group by 12 points from Hilal, while Ahly Tripoli won their group by 6 points from cross-city rivals Madina.

The championship match took place on June 14, 1994, at the 11 June Stadium. Ahly Tripoli defeated Ittihad 1–0 to achieve the national crown.

== League standings ==
=== Group A ===
Pos	Team	Pld	W	D	L	GF	GA	GD	Pts	Qualification
1	Ittihad (A)	20	13	5	2	27	7	+20	44	Playoff
2	Hilal	20	8	8	4	22	14	+8	32	
3	Nasr	20	8	8	4	30	24	+6	32	
4	Sweahly	20	7	8	5	15	13	+2	29	
5	Yarmouk	20	7	4	9	16	22	−6	25	
6	Rafiq Sorman	20	6	7	7	13	17	−4	25	
7	Dhahra Tripoli	20	4	11	5	13	14	−1	23	
8	Darnes	20	4	11	5	12	13	−1	23	
9	Akhdar	20	5	5	10	16	24	−8	20	
10	Wahda	20	4	8	8	13	17	−4	20	
11	Ittihad al Askari	20	4	7	9	14	20	−6	19	

Source: Mushwaar.com (in Arabic)
Rules for classification: 1) points; 2) goal difference; 3) number of goals scored.
(A) Advance to a further round

=== Group B ===
Pos	Team	Pld	W	D	L	GF	GA	GD	Pts	Qualification
1	Ahly Tripoli (A)	18	11	6	1	23	8	+15	39	Playoff
2	Madina	18	9	6	3	21	12	+9	33	
3	Ahly Benghazi	18	6	9	3	15	12	+3	27	
4	Majd	18	5	7	6	17	16	+1	22	
5	Suqoor	18	5	7	6	13	17	−4	22	
6	Murooj	18	6	3	9	15	19	−4	21	
7	Tahaddy	18	6	2	10	15	21	−6	20	
8	Mahalla	18	3	11	4	9	13	−4	20	
9	Afriqi	18	4	7	7	13	17	−4	19	
10	Tersanah	18	4	6	8	14	18	−4	18	

Source: Mushwaar.com (in Arabic)
Rules for classification: 1) points; 2) goal difference; 3) number of goals scored.
(A) Advance to a further round

== Playoff ==
The top team from each group advanced to a one-off playoff match, to be played at the 11 June Stadium. Ahly Tripoli defeated bitter rivals Ittihad through an Idris Mikraaz goal to win their 8th Premier League title.

14 June 1994
18:00 EET

Ahly Tripoli	1 – 0	Ittihad
Idris Mikraaz

11 June Stadium, Tripoli
