= 1992–93 Libyan Premier League =

Libyan Premier League
- Season: 1992–93

The 1992–93 Libyan Premier League was the 26th edition of the competition since its inception in 1963. 19 teams contested the league, with Ahly Benghazi the champions. There was no relegation as the league expanded to 21 teams the following season. The league went to a play off match between Tripoli rivals Ahly and Ittihad, as both were level on points after 36 games. Ahly Tripoli won 2–0 to win their 7th league title and their first for 9 years.

== League table ==
Pos	Team	Pld	W	D	L	GF	GA	GD	Pts	Qualification
1	Ahly Tripoli (A)	36	20	13	3	39	11	+28	53	Championship Playoff
2	Ittihad (A)	36	20	13	3	35	12	+23	53	Championship Playoff
3	Ahly Benghazi	36	17	9	10	42	29	+13	43	
4	Darnes	36	12	15	9	27	26	+1	39	
5	Nasr	36	14	8	14	41	41	0	36	
6	Suqoor	36	12	12	12	25	26	−1	36	
7	Sweahly	36	13	9	14	39	33	+6	35	
8	Afriqi	36	10	15	11	21	25	−4	35	
9	Dhahra Tripoli	36	7	21	8	17	19	−2	35	
10	Tersanah	36	12	10	14	38	43	−5	34	
11	Ittihad al Askari	36	10	13	13	36	33	+3	33	
12	Wahda	36	9	15	12	27	29	−2	33	
13	Madina	36	9	15	12	26	30	−4	33	
14	Mahalla	36	9	14	13	29	32	−3	32	
15	Majd	36	8	16	12	23	29	−6	32	
16	Murooj	36	9	14	13	22	33	−11	32	
17	Hilal	36	10	12	14	27	36	−9	32	
18	Rafiq Sorman	36	9	13	14	22	33	−11	31	
19	Akhdar	36	11	7	18	23	36	−13	29	

Source: Mushwar.com (in Arabic)
Rules for classification: 1) points; 2) goal difference; 3) number of goals scored.
(A) Advance to a further round

== Results ==
Home \ Away	AFQ	AHLB	AHLT	AKH	DRN	DHAT	HIL	IAA	ITT	MAD	MHL	MJD	MRJ	NSR	RFQ	SQR	SWE	TER	WAH
Afriqi		0–0	1–1	0–1	0–0	0–1	0–0	1–0	0–1	2–1	1–0	1–0	0–0	1–1	0–0	1–1	2–0	1–0	0–0
Ahly Benghazi	1–0		1–0	2–0	1–1	1–2	2–1	2–1	1–1	1–1	1–0	3–1	1–0	3–1	3–1	2–0	1–1	1–1	2–0
Ahly Tripoli	1–0	1–0		1–1	2–0	0–0	1–0	1–0	0–0	1–0	4–0	0–0	1–0	2–1	2–0	3–0	1–0	2–0	2–1
Akhdar	0–0	1–0	0–2		1–0	1–0	0–0	1–3	0–0	1–0	2–1	1–0	0–2	1–0	2–0	0–1	1–0	0–1	2–1
Darnes	1–1	2–0	0–0	0–0		0–0	2–0	2–1	1–1	1–0	3–0	1–0	1–0	1–0	1–0	1–0	0–0	0–0	0–0
Dhahra Tripoli	0–0	3–0	0–0	2–0	0–0		1–0	0–0	0–0	0–0	1–1	0–0	0–0	1–1	0–1	0–0	0–0	1–1	1–0
Hilal	1–2	0–3	0–0	4–2	1–0	0–0		2–1	0–2	1–1	1–0	0–0	1–1	1–2	3–0	1–0	0–1	2–1	0–1
Ittihad al Askari	3–0	2–1	0–2	0–0		0–0	0–0		0–0	0–1	0–0	2–2	2–0	2–1	5–0	1–1	1–0	2–1	2–1
Ittihad	1–0	2–1	0–0	1–0	1–1	1–0	4–0	1–0		1–0	3–2	1–0	1–0	2–0	1–0	2–0	2–0	2–0	0–0
Madina	0–2	1–4	2–1	1–1	0–1	0–0	0–2	3–2	0–0		0–0	2–1	1–0	4–0	0–0	0–0	1–0		2–2
Mahalla	1–0	0–0	0–2	3–0	1–2	1–0	1–1	0–0	0–1				2–0	2–1	0–0	3–0	4–1		1–0
Majd	0–0	1–0	0–3	2–1	1–0	0–1	0–1	2–1	2–0		1–1		3–1	0–0	0–0	1–1	1–0	2–1	0–0
Murooj	0–0	0–0	0–2	2–0	1–1	1–0	1–0	2–0	1–1	1–1	2–0	0–0		2–0	2–1	1–1	2–2	2–0	
Nasr	3–0	0–1	1–1	2–0	2–2	2–2	3–0	1–0	2–0	1–0	1–1	1–1			2–0	1–0	2–0	4–1	1–0
Rafiq Sorman	1–2	0–0	0–0	1–0	3–0	1–1	0–0	0–0	1–0	0–0	1–1	2–0	2–0	2–1		2–0	1–1	1–2	1–0
Suqoor	1–0	2–0	1–0	1–0	2–1	1–0	1–0	1–1	0–0	0–1	0–1	0–0	0–0	4–0	1–0		2–1	2–1	0–0
Sweahly	5–0	1–0	0–1	3–2	1–0	3–0	0–1	0–1	1–1	1–0	2–0	1–1	3–0	2–0	3–0	1–0		1–0	1–1
Tersanah	2–0	1–3	0–1	1–0	0–0	2–2	2–2	2–0	0–2	0–0	1–1	1–0	3–3	4–2	2–0	1–0	2–1		2–0
Wahda	0–0	0–2	0–0	3–1	3–0	1–0	3–2	0–0	0–2	2–0		1–0	2–1		0–0	1–1	2–1	1–1	

Updated to match(es) played on unknown. Source: Mushwar.com (in Arabic)
Legend: Blue = home team win; Yellow = draw; Red = away team win.

== Championship playoff ==
As Ahly & Ittihad were tied on points, the league title went to a one-off playoff match. The match was played at the 28 March Stadium in Benghazi.

2 August 1993
18:00 EET

Ahly Tripoli	2 – 0	Ittihad
Adil Khuzaam; Kemaal al Zurooq

28 March Stadium, Benghazi
