= 1991–92 Libyan Premier League =

Libyan Premier League
- Season: 1991–92

The 1991–92 Libyan Premier League season was the 25th edition of the competition. It was contested between August 1991 and May 1992.

== Teams ==
The league was composed of 21 teams. Each of these teams played each other once, meaning each side played 20 matches. The 21 sides that competed in this season were:

- Al Ahly Tripoli
- Al Ahly Benghazi
- Al Madina
- Darnes
- Al Wahda
- Al Ittihad Tripoli
- Al Murooj
- Al Ittihad Gheryan
- Al Nasr
- Al Hilal
- Rafik Sorman
- Al Mahalla
- Al Tersana
- Al Akhdar
- Al Afriqi
- Al Sweahly
- Al Suqoor
- Al Dhahra
- Al Tahaddi
- Al Ittihad Taajoura
- Al-Shorta Tripoli

== League table ==
Pos	Team	Pld	W	D	L	GF	GA	GD	Pts	Qualification or relegation
1	Al Ahly Benghazi (C)	20	12	5	3	22	7	+15	49	Champions
2	Al Ahly Tripoli	20	10	8	2	21	10	+11	48	
3	Al Madina	20	8	9	3	20	9	+11	45	
4	Darnes	20	8	9	3	20	13	+7	45	
5	Al Wahda	20	6	13	1	20	14	+6	45	
6	Al Ittihad Tripoli	20	8	7	5	23	17	+6	43	
7	Al Murooj	20	7	9	4	17	15	+2	43	
8	Al Ittihad Gheryan	20	7	8	5	18	11	+7	42	
9	Al Nasr	20	8	5	7	26	18	+8	41	
10	Al Hilal	20	5	10	5	15	11	+4	40	
11	Rafik Sorman	20	6	8	6	18	22	−4	40	
12	Al Mahalla	20	5	10	5	18	22	−4	40	
13	Al Tersanah	20	5	9	6	25	20	+5	39	
14	Al Akhdar	20	4	11	5	18	21	−3	39	
15	Al Afriqi	20	4	11	5	7	11	−4	39	
16	Al Sweahly	20	6	6	8	14	15	−1	38	
17	Al Suqoor	20	3	12	5	11	14	−3	38	
18	Al Dhahra Tripoli	20	4	10	6	10	14	−4	38	
19	Al Tahaddi (R)	20	5	7	8	22	21	+1	37	Relegation to 1992-93 Libyan Second Division
20	Al Ittihad Taajoura (R)	20	1	5	14	14	35	−21	27	Relegation to 1992-93 Libyan Second Division
21	Al-Shorta Tripoli (R)	20	0	4	16	7	46	−39	24	Relegation to 1992-93 Libyan Second Division

Source: RSSSF
Rules for classification: 3-2-1 point system
(C) Champions; (R) Relegated
