= 2016 Libyan Premier League =

Libyan Premier League
- Season: 2016
- Champions: Al-Ahli Tripoli (12th title)
- Champions League: Al-Ahli Tripoli
- Top goalscorer: Salem Roma (Al-Nasr) (8 goals)

The 2015–16 season of the Libyan Premier League is the 46th edition of the country's top level association football league since its inception in 1963. It came two and a half years after the last competition was held by the Libyan Football Federation (LFF) due to the security concerns and general unrest throughout the country during the Libyan Crisis and Libyan civil war (2014–present).

Several meeting between the LFF and club representatives were held in the beginning of 2016 to arrange for the re-launch of the competition and it was agreed that the league would commence on 15 May with 21 participating teams. In contrast to the previous seasons, the league is divided into two groups; one for clubs from the eastern region of Libya and one for the clubs from the western region with a Playoffs system held to determine the champion.

== Teams ==
Due to the situation in Libya in mid-2016 and the difficulty in air-travel, the participating teams were grouped by their geographical location. Teams from each group were scheduled to play every team from their group in a one-legged match with 3 points given for a win and 1 point for a draw. The two teams from group A and the three teams from group B with the highest ranking within their group would then face off in a Single-elimination tournament to determine the champions.

Location of teams in 2016 Libyan Premier League

Group A		Group B	
Team	Location	Team	Location
Al-Ahly (Benghazi)	Benghazi	Al-Ahli (Tripoli)	Tripoli
Al-Nasr	Benghazi	Al-Ittihad	Tripoli
Al-Hilal	Benghazi	Al-Madina	Tripoli
Annajma	Benghazi	Al-Shat	Tripoli
Al Tahaddy	Benghazi	Al Tarsana	Tripoli (Souq al Jum'aa)
Al Akhdar	Bayda	Al-Wahda	Tripoli
Darnes	Derna	Almahalla	Tripoli
Shabaab al Jabal	Shahhat	Olympic Azzaweya	Zawiya
Al Ta'awon	Ajdabiya	Asswehly	Misurata
		Khaleej Sirte	Sirte
		Al Charara	Sabha
		Abi Ashhar	Tripoli (Tajura)

== Stadiums ==
Neutral stadiums were identified within each region to host group games.

Stadium	Location	Capacity
11 June Stadium	Tripoli	65,000
Martyrs of February Stadium	Benghazi	10,550
9th July Stadium	Misrata	10,000
Janzour Academy Stadium	Janzur	
North Benghazi Stadium	Benghazi	

== Group stage ==
=== Group A ===
Pos	Team	Pld	W	D	L	GF	GA	GD	Pts	Qualification
1	Al-Ahly (Benghazi) (Q)	8	5	3	0	14	8	+6	18	Qualified to the Championship Round
2	Al-Nasr (Q)	8	5	2	1	16	5	+11	17	Qualified to the Championship Round
3	Al-Hilal	8	4	3	1	12	5	+7	15	
4	Al Akhdar	8	4	3	1	10	5	+5	15	
5	Annajma	8	2	3	3	9	14	−5	9	
6	Shabaab al Jabal	8	2	2	4	9	12	−3	8	
7	Al Ta'awon	8	2	1	5	8	13	−5	7	
8	Darnes	8	1	2	5	5	15	−10	5	
9	Al Tahaddy	8	1	1	6	8	14	−6	4	

Updated to match(es) played on 15 August 2016. Source: soccerway.com
Rules for classification: 1) points; 2) goal difference; 3) number of goals scored.
(Q) Qualified for the phase indicated

=== Group B ===
Pos	Team	Pld	W	D	L	GF	GA	GD	Pts	Qualification
1	Al-Madina (Q)	11	7	4	0	16	4	+12	25	Qualified to the Championship Round
2	Al-Ahli (Tripoli) (Q)	11	7	3	1	18	8	+10	24	Qualified to the Championship Round
3	Asswehly (Q)	11	6	5	0	15	4	+11	23	Qualified to the Championship Round
4	Al-Ittihad	11	7	2	2	22	10	+12	23	
5	Al-Shat	11	5	3	3	16	10	+6	18	
6	Abi al Ashhar	11	5	3	3	12	8	+4	18	
7	Olympic Azzaweya	11	3	6	2	8	7	+1	15	
8	Khaleej Sirte	11	3	2	6	14	22	−8	11	
9	Al-Wahda	11	3	1	7	14	16	−2	10	
10	Al Charara	11	2	2	7	9	21	−12	8	
11	Almahalla	11	1	1	9	7	19	−12	4	
12	Al Tarsana	11	0	2	9	4	26	−22	2	

Updated to match(es) played on 25 September 2016. Source: soccerway.com
Rules for classification: 1) points; 2) goal difference; 3) number of goals scored.
(Q) Qualified for the phase indicated

== Championship round ==
After 9 rounds in Group A, the two highest ranking teams move on to the Championship Round. Similarly, after 11 rounds in Group B, the three highest ranking teams move on to the Championship Round. The first matches in the Championship Round was played in 28 October.

Pos	Team	Pld	W	D	L	GF	GA	GD	Pts	Qualification
1	Al-Ahli (Tripoli) (C)	4	3	1	0	8	1	+7	10	Qualification for the 2017 CAF Champions League
2	Asswehly	4	1	3	0	3	1	+2	6	
3	Al-Ahly (Benghazi)	4	1	2	1	2	4	−2	5	
4	Al-Madina	4	1	1	2	3	4	−1	4	
5	Al-Nasr	4	0	1	3	3	9	−6	1	

Updated to match(es) played on 24 November 2016. Source:
Rules for classification: 1) points; 2) goal difference; 3) number of goals scored.
(C) Champions
