= 1987 Libyan Premier League =

Libyan Premier League
- Season: 1987

The 1987 Libyan Premier League was the 20th edition of the competition since its inception in 1963. The league consisted of 18 teams, who played each other just once. The first round of matches were played on March 20, 1987, and the final round of games was played on August 28, 1987. Benghazi club Nasr won their first title by one point, from Madina.

== League standings ==
Pos	Team	Pld	W	D	L	GF	GA	GD	Pts
1	Nasr	17	12	4	1	31	13	+18	45
2	Madina	17	12	3	2	30	11	+19	44
3	Ittihad	17	11	3	3	33	11	+22	42
4	Ahly Benghazi	17	9	7	1	25	12	+13	42
5	Ahly Tripoli	17	5	12	0	13	6	+7	39
6	Darnes	17	6	7	4	26	18	+8	36
7	Suqoor	17	4	10	3	17	16	+1	35
8	Wahda	17	5	7	5	13	16	−3	34
9	Afriqi	17	5	5	7	11	14	−3	32
10	Dhahra	17	5	5	7	15	20	−5	32
11	Mahalla	17	5	5	7	15	21	−6	32
12	Rafik Sorman	17	4	7	6	13	20	−7	32
13	Akhdar	17	5	4	8	18	22	−4	31
14	Sweahly	17	3	8	6	9	14	−5	31
15	Tahaddy	17	3	6	8	17	22	−5	29
16	Hilal	17	1	10	6	9	21	−12	29
17	Shabaab al Arabi	17	2	5	10	9	24	−15	26
18	Olomby	17	0	4	13	10	33	−23	21

Rules for classification: 3-2-1 point system
