= Samir Al Wahaj =

Libyan footballer (born 1979)

Samir al Wahaj
Personal information
- Full name: Samir al Wahaj
- Date of birth: September 1, 1979 (age 47)
- Place of birth: Libya
- Position: Striker

Team information
- Current team: Ahly Benghazi
- Number: 11

Senior career*
Years	Team	Apps	(Gls)
1999–2001	Ghaout al Sha'aal	?	(?)
2001	Al Madina	?	(?)
2001–02	Dhahra Tripoli	?	(?)
2002–04	Wefaq Sabratha	?	(?)
2004–05	Urouba	22	(5)
2005–06	Wahda Tripoli	26	(18)
2006–09	Akhdar	?	(1)
2006–07	Olomby (loan)	?	(1)
2007–08	Urouba (loan)	30	(8)
2008–09	Tersanah (loan)	30	(19)
2009–	Ahly Benghazi	10	(6)
- * Club domestic league appearances and goals as of 00:57, 2 January 2010 (UTC)

Samir Al Wahaj (born September 1, 1979) is a Libyan footballer, currently playing for Ahly Benghazi in the Libyan Premier League

== Career ==
Samir is somewhat of a journeyman striker. He started his career at Ghawt Al Sha'al, before moving to Al Madina, where he won the Libyan Premier League in 2001.

He then moved to Wefaq Sabratha, where he spent just over a year before he transferred to Al Urouba in July 2004.

He won the Libyan Second Division with the club - season 2004-05 - and moved back to Tripoli to play for Al Wahda. He top scored in the Libyan Premier League for the 2005-06 season when he scored 18 goals.

After interest from other clubs, he then moved to Akhdar prior to the 2006-07 season. In January 2007, he moved to Al Olympic after few chances in the Al Akhdar first team.

He was loaned out to Al Urouba for the 2007–08 season, and was loaned out to Al Tersana for the 2008–09 season. He claimed the Libyan Golden Boot, scoring 19 goals, as well as firing two goals in the 2009 Libyan Cup Final.

Ahly Benghazi signed him upon his return to Akhdar.

He has also played for Al Dhahra.
