= 2024–25 Libyan Premier League =

Libyan Premier League
- Season: 2024–25
- Dates: 11 December 2024 – 12 August 2025
- Champions: Al-Ahli Tripoli
- Relegated: Al-Wefaq Ajdabiya; Al-Mahdia; Al Nahda Sabha; Asaria
- CAF Champions League: Al-Ahli Tripoli; Al-Hilal Benghazi
- CAF Confederation Cup: Al Akhdar; Al-Ittihad Tripoli
- Top goalscorer: Mabululu (18 goals)

The 2024–25 Libyan Premier League was the 50th season of the Libyan Premier League, the premier football competition in Libya. Al-Nasr is the defending champion. The league was scheduled to start on 2 October but was postponed due to several clubs objecting to the format of the league.

== Format ==
The league consists of 35 teams, split into four groups based on their location. The four-group system is applied due to the lack of a sponsor to cover the travel costs of the clubs. According to a decision issued on 14 July 2024 after it came into effect last season, the Libyan Football Federation allows clubs to field a maximum of three players in the match who hold the nationalities of North African countries (Algeria, Egypt, Morocco and Tunisia) in addition to Sudan and Palestine who are not treated as foreigners. It also allows a maximum of three foreign players to participate.

== Teams ==
On 5 September, Al-Watan and Al-Majd won promotion from the Western Group. This is Al Watan Club's first ever participation in the Premier League. On 6 September, Al-Borouq and Khaleej Sirte secured promotion to the league.

=== Stadiums and locations ===
Team	Location	Stadium	Capacity
Al-Ahly SCSC	Martyrs of February Stadium	Benghazi	10,550
Al-Ahly Tripoli	Tripoli Stadium	Tripoli	50,000
Al-Hilal SCSC	Martyrs of February Stadium	Benghazi	10,550
Al-Nasr SCSC	Martyrs of February Stadium	Benghazi	10,550
Al-Ittihad Tripoli	Tripoli Stadium	Tripoli	50,000
Al-Tahaddy	Martyrs of February Stadium	Benghazi	10,550
Al-Wefaq Ajdabiya	Ajdabiya Stadium	Ajdabiya	

== Managerial changes ==
Team	Outgoing manager	Manner of departure	Date of vacancy	Position in table	Incoming manager	Date of appointment
Al-Nasr	(Libya) Osama Al Hammadi	Resigned	2 August 2024	Pre-season	Tarek El Ashry	9 August 2024
Abu Salim	Chokri Khatoui	Sacked		Pre-season	Sérgio Traguil	3 August 2024
Al-Tahaddy	Nasser Al-Hadhiri	Resigned	22 August 2024	Pre-season	Skander Kasri	24 August 2024
Al-Madina	Mounir Chebil			Pre-season	Saeed Al-Saibi	3 September 2024
Al-Ahli Tripoli	Chokri Khatoui	Sacked	25 September 2024	Pre-season	Didier Gomes	16 October 2024
Al-Tahaddy	Skander Kasri	Sacked	17 October 2024	Pre-season	Khaled Galal	18 October 2024
Al-Ahly Benghazi	Dejan Arsov	Sacked		Pre-season	Momen Soliman	13 November 2024
Al-Khums	Reda Attia	Mutual consent	13 November 2024	Pre-season		
Khaleej Sirte	Akram Al-Hamali	Resigned		Pre-season	Abdelati Al-Qabi	14 November 2024
Al-Ittihad	Osama Al Hamadi	Resigned	29 December 2024		Juan Carlos Garrido	3 January 2025

== Regular season ==
=== Zone One ===
==== Group A ====
Pos	Team	Pld	W	D	L	GF	GA	GD	Pts	Promotion, qualification or relegation
1	Al-Nasr	16	9	5	2	20	9	+11	32	Qualification for the second round
2	Al-Akhdar	16	9	4	3	25	11	+14	31	Qualification for the second round
3	Al-Tahaddy	16	6	7	3	20	14	+6	25	Qualification for the second round
4	Al-Anwar	16	5	4	7	18	26	−8	19	
5	Al-Suqoor	16	5	4	7	16	20	−4	19	
6	Al-Borouq	16	3	9	4	14	15	−1	18	
7	Khaleej Sirte	16	4	5	7	15	21	−6	17	Relegation play-offs
8	Al-Ansar (Note: Al-Ansar were deducted 1 point.)	16	5	2	9	17	24	−7	16	Relegation play-offs
9	Al-Wefaq Ajdabiya (Note: Al-Wefaq Ajdabiya were deducted 3 points.) (R)	16	4	4	8	9	14	−5	13	Relegation to First Division

(R) Relegated

==== Group B ====
Pos	Team	Pld	W	D	L	GF	GA	GD	Pts	Promotion, qualification or relegation
1	Al-Hilal SCSC	14	11	1	2	30	12	+18	34	Qualification for the second round
2	Al-Ahli Benghazi	14	11	1	2	31	6	+25	34	Qualification for the second round
3	Al-Sadaqa	14	7	3	4	16	13	+3	24	Qualification for the second round
4	Al-Ta'awon	14	6	4	4	19	14	+5	22	
5	Al-Andalus	14	5	3	6	17	18	−1	18	
6	Al-Murooj	14	3	3	8	14	25	−11	12	Relegation play-offs
7	Al-Branes	14	2	2	10	11	28	−17	8	Relegation play-offs
8	Al-Mahdia (R)	14	1	3	10	8	30	−22	6	Relegation to First Division

(R) Relegated

=== Zone Two ===
==== Group C ====
Pos	Team	Pld	W	D	L	GF	GA	GD	Pts	Promotion, qualification or relegation
1	Asswehly	16	12	4	0	36	12	+24	40	Qualification for the second round
2	Olympic Azzaweya	16	11	4	1	28	13	+15	37	Qualification for the second round
3	Al-Ittihad Tripoli	16	8	4	4	24	10	+14	28	Qualification for the second round
4	Al-Majd	16	6	3	7	25	29	−4	21	
5	Abu Salim	16	6	2	8	20	24	−4	20	
6	Al-Bashaer	16	4	5	7	19	21	−2	17	
7	Shabab Al-Ghar	16	4	8	4	18	18	0	20	Relegation play-offs
8	Al-Tarsana	16	3	6	7	22	22	0	15	Relegation play-offs
9	Al-Nahda Sabha (Note: Al Nahda Sabha were deducted 3 points.) (R)	16	0	0	16	5	48	−43	−3	Relegation to First Division

(R) Relegated

==== Group D ====
Pos	Team	Pld	W	D	L	GF	GA	GD	Pts	Promotion, qualification or relegation
1	Al-Ahli Tripoli	16	13	3	0	38	4	+34	42	Qualification for the second round
2	Al-Madina	16	10	4	2	27	14	+13	34	Qualification for the second round
3	Al-Ittihad Misurata	16	6	5	5	14	14	0	23	Qualification for the second round
4	Al-Watan (Note: Al-Watan were deducted 1 point.)	16	5	5	6	19	22	−3	19	
5	Al-Malaab El-Libby	16	3	9	4	13	15	−2	18	
6	Al-Khums	16	5	1	10	11	20	−9	16	
7	Abi Al-Ashar	16	3	6	7	10	18	−8	15	Relegation play-offs
8	Al-Dhahra	16	3	6	7	11	22	−11	15	Relegation play-offs
9	Asaria (R)	16	3	3	10	13	27	−14	12	Relegation to First Division

(R) Relegated

== Second round ==
=== Eastern Group ===
Pos	Team	Pld	W	D	L	GF	GA	GD	Pts	Promotion, qualification or relegation
1	Al-Ahli SCSC	10	6	4	0	23	8	+15	22	Qualification for the final
2	Al-Hilal SCSC	10	5	4	1	20	13	+7	19	Qualification for the CAF play-offs
3	Al-Akhdar	10	4	5	1	12	8	+4	17	
4	Al-Nasr	10	3	5	2	10	13	−3	14	
5	Al-Sadaqa	10	2	3	5	8	15	−7	9	
6	Al-Tahaddy	10	0	1	9	7	23	−16	1	

=== Western Group ===
Pos	Team	Pld	W	D	L	GF	GA	GD	Pts	Promotion, qualification or relegation
1	Asswehly	10	4	5	1	19	11	+8	17	Qualification for the final
2	Al-Ahli Tripoli	9	4	4	1	19	9	+10	16	Qualification for the CAF play-offs
3	Al-Ittihad SCSC	9	5	1	3	9	11	−2	16	
4	Al-Ittihad Misurata	9	2	4	3	9	13	−4	10	
5	Al-Madina	9	3	1	5	12	17	−5	10	
6	Olympic Azzaweya	10	1	3	6	10	17	−7	6	

Updated to match(es) played on 22 June 2025. Source:

== Statistics ==
=== Top goalscorers ===
As of 31 December 2024

Rank	Player	Club	Goals
1	(Angola) Mabululu	Al-Ahli Tripoli	18
