= 2002–03 Libyan Premier League =

Libyan Premier League
- Season: 2002–03

The 2002–03 Libyan Premier League was the 36th edition of the competition organised by the Libyan Football Federation, since the competition's inception in 1963. 14 sides competed in this season's competition, shown below. Al Ittihad won their second title in a row, their 10th overall. They were awarded the Libyan Star, and the golden star upon their badge signifies this.

== Participating teams ==
- Al Ittihad
- Al Nasr
- Al Madina
- Al Hilal
- Al Sweahly
- Al Ahly Tripoli
- Al Olomby
- Wefaq Sabratha
- Al Tahaddi
- Al Tersanah
- Al Wahda
- Rafik Sorman
- Al Dhahra
- Al Suqoor

== League table ==
Pos	Team	Pld	W	D	L	GF	GA	GD	Pts	Qualification or relegation
1	Ittihad (C)	26	20	5	1	50	15	+35	65	2004 CAF Champions League
2	Nasr	26	15	7	4	48	27	+21	52	2004 CAF Confederation Cup
3	Hilal	26	11	10	5	42	30	+12	43	
4	Sweahly	26	12	5	9	38	27	+11	41	
5	Ahly Tripoli	26	11	8	7	34	23	+11	41	
6	Olomby	26	11	6	9	38	27	+11	39	
7	Wefaq Sabratha	26	10	7	9	30	30	0	37	
8	Madina	26	9	9	8	41	32	+9	36	
9	Tahaddy	26	9	8	9	29	32	−3	35	
10	Tersanah	26	7	7	12	23	30	−7	28	
11	Wahda	26	6	9	11	21	25	−4	27	
12	Rafiq Sorman	26	7	5	14	29	43	−14	26	
13	Dhahra Tripoli (R)	26	4	4	18	22	70	−48	16	Relegation to 2003–04 Libyan Second Division
14	Suqoor (R)	26	3	4	19	20	54	−34	13	Relegation to 2003–04 Libyan Second Division

Source: RSSSF
Rules for classification: 1) points; 2) goal difference; 3) number of goals scored.
(C) Champions; (R) Relegated
