= 1998–99 Libyan Premier League =

Libyan Premier League
- Season: 1998-99

Following are the statistics of the Libyan Premier League for the 1998–99 season which was the 32nd edition of the competition. The Libyan Premier League (Arabic: دوري الدرجة الأولى الليبي) is the highest division of Libyan football championship, organised by Libyan Football Federation. It was founded in 1963 and features mostly professional players.

== Overview ==
It was contested by 16 teams, and Al Mahalah Tripoli won the championship.

== Group stage ==
=== Group A ===
Pos	Team	Pld	W	D	L	GF	GA	GD	Pts
1	Al-Ahly (Benghazi)	14	9	4	1	24	7	+17	31
2	Al Madina Tripoli	14	6	4	4	17	13	+4	22
3	Olympic (Tripoli)	14	6	3	5	12	10	+2	21
4	Al Tahaddy Benghazi	14	5	6	3	16	15	+1	21
5	Al-Wahda (Tripoli)	14	5	6	3	16	13	+3	21
6	Al Yarmouk	14	4	5	5	16	15	+1	17
7	Al-Mourouj	14	2	5	7	12	20	−8	11
8	Al Soukour	14	0	5	9	7	27	−20	5

=== Group B ===
Pos	Team	Pld	W	D	L	GF	GA	GD	Pts
1	Al-Hilal (Benghazi)	14	8	3	3	19	10	+9	27
2	Al Mahalah Tripoli	14	8	1	5	22	11	+11	25
3	Al Shat Tripoli	14	6	5	3	14	9	+5	23
4	Al-Akhdara (Benghazi)	14	6	2	6	12	15	−3	20
5	Al-Nasr (Benghazi)	14	6	3	5	22	16	+6	20 (Note: 1 point deducted?)
6	Al-Wiffak (Benghazi)	14	4	6	4	16	17	−1	18
7	Al-Shawehly (Misurata)	14	3	5	6	9	14	−5	14
8	Al-Intilak	14	1	3	10	10	30	−20	6

== Playoff ==
=== Championship Group ===
Pos	Team	Pld	W	D	L	GF	GA	GD	Pts
1	Al Mahalah Tripoli	13	9	3	1	19	7	+12	30
2	Al Shat Tripoli	13	7	2	4	15	11	+4	23
3	Al-Hilal (Benghazi)	13	5	6	2	9	6	+3	21
4	Al-Akhdara (Benghazi)	13	3	7	3	10	9	+1	16
5	Al-Ahly (Benghazi)	13	3	5	5	20	17	+3	14
6	Al Madina Tripoli	13	2	8	3	8	15	−7	14
7	Olympic (Tripoli)	13	2	5	6	7	14	−7	11
8	Al Tahaddy Benghazi	13	2	2	9	8	16	−8	8

=== Relegation Group ===
Pos	Team	Pld	W	D	L	GF	GA	GD	Pts
9	Al-Shawehly (Misurata)	14	8	4	2	14	6	+8	28
10	Al-Mourouj	14	8	3	3	21	12	+9	27
11	Al Yarmouk	14	7	5	2	15	6	+9	26
12	Al-Wahda (Tripoli)	14	5	6	3	11	6	+5	21
13	Al-Intilak	13	5	2	6	18	11	+7	17
14	Al-Wiffak (Benghazi)	14	4	5	5	13	13	0	17
15	Al-Nasr (Benghazi)	13	3	4	6	5	10	−5	13
16	Al Soukour	14	0	1	13	3	36	−33	1
