= 2013–14 Libyan Premier League =

Libyan Premier League
- Highest attendance: Al-Ittihad, 50,000

The 2013–14 season of the Libyan Premier League is the 45th edition of the country's top level association footballleague since its inception in 1963. It is the first officially recognised domestic competition since the end of the Libyan Civil War in 2011. Several previous attempts had been made to restart the domestic campaign, though these were thwarted by continuing security concerns and general unrest throughout the country. The Libyan Football Federation (LFF) therefore agreed to try a one-off campaign to assess the viability of future domestic competition, with the 16 teams participating the same as those who had started the previous campaign back in 2010.

The season started on 27 September 2013. In contrast to the previous season, the league is divided into two groups.

== Teams ==
=== Team summaries ===
Team	Location	Sha'biyah	Stadium	Capacity
Al Ahly	Benghazi	Benghazi	Martyrs of February Stadium	10,550
Al Ahly	Tripoli	Tripoli	11 June Stadium	65,000
Al Akhdar	Bayda	Jabal al Akhdar	Owol September Stadium	10,000
Al Hilal	Benghazi	Benghazi	Martyrs of February Stadium	10,550
Al Ittihad	Tripoli	Tripoli	11 June Stadium	65,000
Al Madina	Tripoli	Tripoli	11 June Stadium	65,000
Al Najma	Benghazi	Benghazi	Martyrs of February Stadium	10,550
Al Nasr	Benghazi	Benghazi	Martyrs of February Stadium	10,550
Al Olympique	Zawiya	Zawiya	Zaawia Stadium	6,000
Al Shat	Tripoli	Tripoli	GMR Stadium	20,000
Al Swihli	Misrata	Misrata	9 July Stadium	10,000
Al Tahaddi	Benghazi	Benghazi	March 28 Stadium	55,000
Al Tirsana	Tripoli	Tripoli	GMR Stadium	20,000
Al Wahda	Tripoli	Tripoli	Ali Alsgozy Stadium	3,000
Darnes	Derna	Bayda	Al Bayda Stadium	10,000
Khaleej Sirte	Sirte	Sirte	2 March Stadium	2,000

== Regular season ==
=== Group A ===
Pos	Team	Pld	W	D	L	GF	GA	GD	Pts	Qualification or relegation
1	Al-Ahli Tripoli (A)	14	10	3	1	25	4	+21	33	
2	Al-Madina (A)	14	7	5	2	14	10	+4	26	
3	Al-Hilal (A)	14	5	6	3	12	9	+3	21	
4	Al Swihli	14	4	6	4	11	11	0	18	
5	Al Nasr	14	5	3	6	12	20	−8	18	
6	Al Akhdar	14	4	5	5	13	10	+3	17	
7	Khaleej Sirte (R)	14	3	5	6	15	24	−9	14	Relegation to Libyan Second Division 2014–15
8	Al Tirsana (R)	14	1	1	12	4	18	−14	4	Relegation to Libyan Second Division 2014–15

Updated to match(es) played on 9 May 2014. Source:
Rules for classification: 1) points; 2) goal difference; 3) number of goals scored.
(A) Advance to a further round; (R) Relegated

=== Group B ===
Pos	Team	Pld	W	D	L	GF	GA	GD	Pts	Qualification or relegation
1	Al-Ittihad (A)	14	9	4	1	24	9	+15	31	
2	Al-Ahly Benghazi (A)	14	8	4	2	30	15	+15	28	
3	Al-Wahda (A)	14	6	3	5	19	23	−4	21	
4	Darnes	14	4	6	4	19	23	−4	18	
5	Al Najma	14	5	2	7	19	20	−1	17	
6	Al Olympique	14	3	6	5	14	16	−2	15	
7	Al Tahaddi (R)	14	2	5	7	13	22	−9	11	Relegation to Libyan Second Division 2014–15
8	Al Shat (R)	14	1	6	7	14	24	−10	9	Relegation to Libyan Second Division 2014–15

Updated to match(es) played on 9 May 2014. Source:
Rules for classification: 1) points; 2) goal difference; 3) number of goals scored.
(A) Advance to a further round; (R) Relegated

== Championship round ==
Pos	Team	Pld	W	D	L	GF	GA	GD	Pts	Qualification or relegation
1	Al-Ahli Tripoli	5	5	0	0	9	3	+6	15	2015 CAF Champions League
2	Al-Ittihad	5	4	0	1	8	4	+4	12	
3	Al-Hilal	5	1	2	2	4	6	−2	5	
4	Al-Wahda	5	1	1	3	8	11	−3	4	
5	Al-Ahly Benghazi	5	1	1	3	4	7	−3	4	
6	Al-Madina	5	1	0	4	3	5	−2	3	

Updated to match(es) played on 24 June 2014. Source:
Rules for classification: 1) points; 2) goal difference; 3) number of goals scored.
