= 1985–86 Libyan Premier League =

Libyan Premier League
- Season: 1985–86

Following are the statistics of the Libyan Premier League for the 1985–86 season which it was the 19th edition of the competition. The Libyan Premier League (Arabic: دوري الدرجة الأولى الليبي) is the highest division of Libyan football championship, organised by Libyan Football Federation. It was founded in 1963 and features mostly professional players.

== Overview ==
16 teams were split into two groups, depending on their geographic location. Top two teams in each group advanced to the semifinals.

== Teams ==
=== Group A (East) ===
- Afriqi
- Akhdar
- Al-Ahly Benghazi
- Hilal
- Nasr
- Tahaddy
- Suqoor

=== Group B (West) ===
- Al-Ahl Tripoli
- Shabab al Arabi
- Dhahra
- Madina
- Mahalla
- Olomby
- Wahda
- Sweahly
- Ittihad Tripoli

== Playoff ==
=== Semifinal ===
- Al-Ahly (Benghazi) 0-1; 0-0 Al-Ittihad (Tripoli)
- Al-Ahl (Tripoli) 6-2; 2-3 Al-Nasr (Benghazi)

=== Final ===
- Al-Ittihad (Tripoli) 2-1 Al-Ahly (Tripoli)
