= 2006–07 Libyan Premier League =

Libyan Premier League
- Season: 2006–07

The 2006–07 Libyan Premier League was the 40th edition of The Libyan Premier League, the highest division of Libyan football championship, organised by Libyan Football Federation.

== Competition ==
There were 14 clubs in the League for this season. During the course of the season each club plays each other home and away, for a total of 26 games. However, after Al Charara had all of its matches canceled by the LFF, all teams played 24 games. At the end of season, the lowest two placed teams were automatically relegated to the Libyan Second Division, with the winner of the LSD automatically taking its place. However, because of the troubles of Al Charara, three clubs were promoted from the Second Division for 2007/2008

== Teams ==
Club	City	Stadium
Al Ahly Benghazi	Benghazi, Libya	28 March Stadium
Al Ahly Tripoli	Tripoli, Libya	11 June Stadium
Al Akhdar	Bayda, Libya	Al Bayda Stadium
Al Charara	Sabha, Libya	Sabha Stadium
Al Hilal	Benghazi, Libya	28 March Stadium
Al Ittihad	Tripoli, Libya	11 June Stadium
Al Madina	Tripoli, Libya	11 June Stadium
Al Nasr	Benghazi, Libya	March 28 Stadium
Al Olympic	Zawiya, Libya	Al-Olympic Stadium
Al Shat	Tripoli, Libya	The Industrial River Stadium
Al Soukour	Tobruk, Libya	
Al Tahaddy	Benghazi, Libya	March 28 Stadium
Khaleej Sirte	Sirte, Libya	Sirte Stadium
Rafik Sorman	Sorman, Libya	Rafik Sorman Stadium

== Final standings ==
Pos	Team	Pld	W	D	L	GF	GA	GD	Pts	Qualification or relegation
1	Ittihad (C)	24	16	7	1	32	6	+26	55	2008 CAF Champions League
2	Ahly Tripoli	24	16	1	7	41	16	+25	49	
3	Madina	24	12	7	5	35	21	+14	43	
4	Akhdar (Q)	24	12	4	8	40	32	+8	40 (Note: Akhdar qualified for the CAF Confederation Cup via the Libyan Cup (as beaten finalists - winners Ittihad had already qualified for the CAF Champions League))	2008 CAF Confederation Cup
5	Ahly Benghazi	24	8	11	5	26	19	+7	35	
6	Nasr	24	7	11	6	26	29	−3	31 (Note: Nasr deducted one point after a pitch invasion in the 68th minute during their 0–2 defeat to Ittihad.)	
7	Khaleej Sirte	24	7	7	10	21	31	−10	28	
8	Olomby	24	5	9	10	9	22	−13	24	
9	Suqoor	24	6	6	12	27	33	−6	24	
10	Shat	24	6	6	12	15	30	−15	24	
11	Tahaddy	24	4	10	10	18	26	−8	22	
12	Hilal (R)	24	5	7	12	19	28	−9	22	Relegation to Libyan Second Division
13	Rafiq Sorman (R)	24	4	10	10	23	39	−16	20 (Note: Rafik Sorman deducted 2 points after their supporters attacked Nasr players)	Relegation to Libyan Second Division
14	Sharrara (R)	12	1	4	7	9	15	−6	7 (Note: Al Charara had all matches annulled on January 8, 2007, and were relegated to the Libyan Second Division.)	Relegation to Libyan Second Division

Source: RSSSF
Rules for classification: 1) points; 2) goal difference; 3) number of goals scored.
(C) Champions; (Q) Qualified for the phase indicated; (R) Relegated
