= 2004–05 Libyan Premier League =

Libyan Premier League
- Season: 2004–05

The 2004–05 Libyan Premier League was the 38th edition of the Libyan Premier League, the top tier of Libyan football organised by the Libyan Football Federation. The season started on September 10, 2004, culminating on July 12, 2005. Al Ittihad secured their 11th league title, with newly promoted Urouba finishing as runners-up and champions Al Olomby only managing to finish 3rd.

== Competition ==
The season contained 14 sides, who each played each other twice. However, after Nasr and Ahly Tripoli's expulsion from the league on May 9, 2005, all matches that were played against these two clubs were cancelled.

== Teams ==
Club	City	Stadium
Al Ahly Tripoli	Tripoli, Libya	11 June Stadium
Al Akhdar	Bayda, Libya	Al Bayda Stadium
Al Hilal	Benghazi, Libya	28 March Stadium
Al Ittihad	Tripoli, Libya	11 June Stadium
Al Madina	Tripoli, Libya	11 June Stadium
Al Mustaqbal	Tripoli, Libya	The Industrial River Stadium
Al Nasr	Benghazi, Libya	28 March Stadium
Al Olympic	Zawiya, Libya	Al-Olympic Stadium
Al Shat	Tripoli, Libya	The Industrial River Stadium
Al Sweahly	Misrata, Libya	9 July Stadium
Al Tahaddy	Benghazi, Libya	28 March Stadium
Al Urouba	Ajaylat, Libya	GMR Stadium
Rafik Sorman	Sorman, Libya	Rafik Sorman Stadium
Wefaq Sabratha	Sabratha, Libya	Ajaylat Stadium

== League table ==
Pos	Team	Pld	W	D	L	GF	GA	GD	Pts	Qualification or relegation
1	Ittihad (C)	22	16	3	3	41	13	+28	51	2006 CAF Champions League
2	Urouba	22	12	7	3	39	21	+18	43	
3	Olomby	22	12	6	4	25	15	+10	42	
4	Akhdar (Q)	22	9	7	6	23	16	+7	34	2006 CAF Confederation Cup
5	Hilal	22	9	4	9	29	32	−3	31	
6	Madina	22	6	8	8	27	27	0	26	
7	Wefaq Sabrata	22	5	11	6	18	24	−6	26	
8	Shat	22	7	5	10	19	32	−13	26	
9	Mustaqbal	22	6	5	11	30	32	−2	23	
10	Rafik Sorman (O)	22	5	8	9	20	25	−5	23	Qualification for Playoff
11	Sweahly (R)	22	4	6	12	21	34	−13	18	Relegation to 2005–06 Libyan Second Division
12	Tahaddy (R)	22	3	5	14	15	36	−21	14	Relegation to 2005–06 Libyan Second Division
13	Nasr (R)	0	0	0	0	0	0	0	0 (Note: Nasr and Ahly Tripoli had all their matches cancelled. All results that related to these two clubs were cancelled also. Nasr were relegated to the Second Division; however, Ahly Tripoli were re-instated into the Premier League for the 2005-06 season.)	Relegation to 2005–06 Libyan Second Division
14	Ahly Tripoli (R)	0	0	0	0	0	0	0	0	Relegation to 2005–06 Libyan Second Division

Source: RSSSF
Rules for classification: 1) points; 2) goal difference; 3) number of goals scored.
(C) Champions; (O) Play-off winners; (Q) Qualified for the phase indicated; (R) Relegated

== Relegation play-offs ==
The promotion/relegation play-off took place between the 10th placed team Rafik Sorman and the 3rd placed team in the 2004-05 Libyan Second Division Playoffs, Al Wahda. A one-off match took place at the 9 July Stadium. The winner, Rafeeq, retained their top flight place for the next season, and Al Wahda remained in the Libyan Second Division for the 2005-06 season.

July 17, 2005
16:00

Rafik Sorman	2 – 0	Al Wahda
Abdulrazzaq Hashanah 45+2'; Rabee' Fathi 85'	Report (in Arabic)

9 July Stadium
Attendance: 8,754
Referee: (Libya) Adil al Swaisy
