= 1983–84 Libyan Premier League =

Libyan Premier League
- Season: 1983–84

The 1983–84 Libyan Premier League was the 17th edition of the competition since its inception in 1963. The 16 competing teams were split into two groups of 8. The top team in each group advanced to a one-off playoff match to decide the championship. The bottom club in each group was relegated.

== Overview ==
In Group A, Nasr won the group by one point from Ittihad, while in Group B, Ahly Tripoli won their group on goal difference from Ahly Benghazi.

In the final, held at the 11 June Stadium, Ahly Tripoli defeated Nasr 1–0, and in doing so, won their 6th national championship.

== Group stage ==
=== Group A ===
Pos	Team	Pld	W	D	L	GF	GA	GD	Pts	Qualification
1	Nasr	14	10	2	2	27	7	+20	22	Advanced to Playoff
2	Ittihad	14	9	3	2	22	9	+13	21	
3	Dhahra	14	9	2	3	27	12	+15	20	
4	Madina	14	7	4	3	22	9	+13	18	
5	Hilal	14	6	4	4	18	12	+6	16	
6	Quds	14	1	4	9	9	40	−31	6	
7	Dhaat al Remaal	14	1	3	10	8	28	−20	5	
8	Darnes	14	1	2	11	7	23	−16	4	

=== Group B ===
Pos	Team	Pld	W	D	L	GF	GA	GD	Pts	Qualification
1	Ahly Tripoli	14	11	2	1	27	2	+25	24	Advanced to Playoff
2	Ahly Benghazi	14	12	0	2	21	3	+18	24	
3	Sweahly	14	5	5	4	9	8	+1	15	
4	Afriqi	14	7	1	6	11	16	−5	15	
5	Tahaddy	14	4	5	5	10	12	−2	13	
6	Wahda	14	5	2	7	13	14	−1	12	
7	Shabab al Arabi	14	3	3	8	4	15	−11	9	
8	Al Charara	14	0	0	14	4	29	−25	0	

== Final ==
Played at 11 June Stadium, Tripoli on July 6, 1984

- Ahly Tripoli 1–0 Nasr

Ahly Tripoli therefore win the Libyan Premier League and qualified for the 1983 African Cup of Champions Clubs. As there was no Libyan Cup competition at this time, Nasr qualified for the 1983 African Cup Winners' Cup.
