= 1997–98 Libyan Premier League =

Football league season

Libyan Premier League
- Season: 1997–98

Statistics of Libyan Premier League for the 1997–98 season which was the 31st edition of the competition.

== Overview ==
It was contested by 16 teams, and Al Tahaddy Benghazi won the championship.

== League standings ==
Pos	Team	Pld	W	D	L	GF	GA	GD	Pts
1	Al Tahaddy Benghazi	30	16	6	8	46	26	+20	54
2	Al-Ahly (Tripoli)	30	15	8	7	36	19	+17	53
3	Al-Ittihad (Tripoli)	30	13	12	5	39	27	+12	51
4	Al-Nasr (Benghazi)	30	15	5	10	31	26	+5	50
5	Al Afriqi Darnah	30	13	10	7	35	21	+14	49
6	Al-Najma (Tripoli)	30	12	9	9	41	35	+6	45
7	Darnes Darnah	30	13	6	11	32	33	−1	45
8	Al Mahalah Tripoli	30	12	7	11	36	34	+2	43
9	Al-Wahda (Tripoli)	30	12	7	11	27	31	−4	43
10	Al Madina Tripoli	30	13	10	7	35	21	+14	42 (Note: 7 points deducted?)
11	Al-Hilal	30	11	8	11	26	29	−3	41
