= 1984–85 Libyan Premier League =

Libyan Premier League
- Season: 1984–85

The 1984–85 Libyan Premier League was the 18th edition of the competition since its inception in 1963.

== Overview ==
It was contested by 16 teams, and Al-Dhahra won the championship.

== Group stage ==
=== Group A ===
Pos	Team	Pld	W	D	L	GF	GA	GD	Pts
1	Al-Ahly (Tripoli)	14	8	4	2	23	10	+13	20
2	Al Madina Tripoli	14	6	6	2	18	9	+9	18
3	Al Tahaddy Benghazi	14	3	9	2	9	6	+3	15
4	Al-Wahda	14	4	7	3	11	9	+2	15
5	Al-Africy	14	4	5	5	7	13	−6	13
6	Al-Mahala	14	4	4	6	11	16	−5	12
7	Al-Hilal (Benghazi)	14	2	7	5	12	14	−2	11
8	That Al-Remal	14	2	4	8	5	19	−14	8

=== Group B ===
Pos	Team	Pld	W	D	L	GF	GA	GD	Pts
1	Al-Dhahra	14	7	6	1	22	8	+14	20
2	Al-Ahly (Benghazi)	14	7	5	2	22	8	+14	19
3	Al-Nasr (Benghazi)	14	7	5	2	22	10	+12	19
4	Al-Ittihad (Tripoli)	14	4	9	1	15	8	+7	17
5	Al Soukour	14	6	4	4	14	16	−2	16
6	Al-Swihli (Misurata)	14	3	6	5	15	21	−6	12
7	Al-Shabab Al-Arabe	14	2	2	10	10	20	−10	6
8	Al-Kudos	14	0	3	11	8	37	−29	3

== Playoff ==
=== Semifinal ===
- Al Madina Tripoli 0-0; 0-1 Al-Dhahra
- Al-Ahly (Benghazi) 1-0; 0-1 (PK 4–2) Al-Ahly (Tripoli)

=== Final ===
- Al-Dhahra 0-0 (PK 2–1) Al-Ahly (Benghazi)
