= 2000 Libyan Premier League =

Libyan Premier League
- Season: 2000

Statistics of Libyan Premier League in season 2000 which was the 33rd edition of the competition.

== Overview ==
It was contested by 15 teams, and Al-Ahly (Tripoli) won the championship.

== Group stage ==
=== Group A ===
Pos	Team	Pld	W	D	L	GF	GA	GD	Pts
1	Al-Ittihad (Tripoli)	9	8	1	0	22	4	+18	25
2	Al Mahalah Tripoli	11	6	3	2	15	10	+5	21
3	Al-Hilal (Benghazi)	10	4	6	0	8	2	+6	18
4	Al-Jadida (Benghazi)	11	3	5	3	12	11	+1	14
5	Al-Nasr (Benghazi)	11	3	5	3	8	12	−4	14
6	Al-Moroug Al Marj	10	3	3	4	11	11	0	12
7	Al Shat Tripoli	11	1	3	7	5	16	−11	6
8	Al-Hyad	12	0	2	10	8	23	−15	2

=== Group B ===
Pos	Team	Pld	W	D	L	GF	GA	GD	Pts
1	Al-Ahly (Tripoli)	10	7	2	1	20	8	+12	23
2	Al Madina Tripoli	10	7	2	1	13	4	+9	23
3	Olympic (Az-Zwiyah)	9	3	5	1	11	8	+3	14
4	Al-Shawehly (Misurata)	9	2	3	4	7	9	−2	9
5	Al-Akhdar (Darnah)	10	2	3	5	5	14	−9	9
6	Al-Ahly (Benghazi)	9	1	4	4	4	10	−6	7
7	Al Tahaddy Benghazi	9	0	3	6	6	15	−9	3

== Final ==
- Al-Ahly (Tripoli) 1-0 Al-Hilal (Benghazi)
