= Al-Tersana =

Al-Tersana (Arabic: دار الصناعة), meaning Arsenal, may refer to:

- Tersana, an Egyptian football club
- Al Tersana (Tripoli), a Libyan football club
