= 1968–69 Libyan Premier League =

Libyan football league season

The 1968–69 Libyan Premier League was the 5th edition of the competition since its inception in 1963.

== Classification ==
Pos	Team	Pld	W	D	L	GF	GA	GD	Pts
1	Al Ittihad	21	15	5	1	45	13	+32	35
2	Al Ahly Benghazi	22	15	4	3	51	12	+39	34
3	Al Ahly Tripoli	22	13	4	5	49	23	+26	30
4	Al Najma	22	11	8	3	42	23	+19	30
5	Al Hilal	22	11	8	3	37	20	+17	30
6	Al Shorta	22	8	7	7	35	23	+12	23
7	Al Madina	22	9	3	10	40	34	+6	21
8	Al Afriqi	22	7	6	9	36	34	+2	20
9	Darnes	22	8	4	10	38	37	+1	20
10	Al Wahda	22	6	3	13	36	43	−7	15
11	Al Nahtha	22	2	1	19	14	92	−78	5
12	Al Qurthabia	22	0	1	21	27	96	−69	1
