= 1970–71 Libyan Premier League =

Libyan Premier League
- Season: 1970–71

The 1970–71 Libyan Premier League was the 7th edition of the competition since its inception in 1963.

== Overview ==
It was contested by 14 teams, and Al-Ahly Tripoli won the championship.

== League standings ==
Pos	Team	Pld	W	D	L	GF	GA	GD	Pts
1	Al-Ahly (Tripoli)	20	11	7	2	32	16	+16	29
2	Al-Ahly (Benghazi)	20	11	6	3	35	18	+17	28
3	Al-Nasr (Benghazi)	20	9	6	5	28	24	+4	24
4	Al-Ittihad (Tripoli)	20	8	4	8	18	18	0	20
5	Al Madina Tripoli	20	5	9	6	22	22	0	19
6	Ittihad Al-Shurta	20	6	7	7	18	26	−8	19
7	Al-Hilal (Benghazi)	20	7	4	9	21	21	0	18
8	Al Tahaddy Benghazi	20	6	5	9	23	24	−1	17
9	Al-Africy	20	6	5	9	23	27	−4	17
10	Al-Wahda	20	6	4	10	15	27	−12	16
11	Al-Dhahra	20	4	5	11	23	35	−12	13
12	Al-Charara (W)	0	–	–	–	–	–	—	0
13	Al-Swihli (W)	0	–	–	–	–	–	—	0
14	Al-Shabab Al-Arabe (W)	0	–	–	–	–	–	—	0

(W) Withdrew
