= 1998 Libyan Super Cup =

Al Mahalla	Al Shat
3	1
- Date: 24 November 1998
- Venue: 11 June Stadium, Tripoli

The 1998 Libyan Super Cup was a football match that took place on Tuesday, November 24, 1998, between LPL winners Al Mahallah and Libyan Al Fatah Cup winners Al Shat. This was the second edition of the competition, and as this was an all-Tripoli final, the match was played at the 11 June Stadium.

Al Mahallah won the match 3–1, and claimed the second Super Cup title.

== Match details ==
1998-11-24
18:00 EET

Al Mahallah	3 – 1	Al Shat

11 June Stadium
Referee: Ahmad Achour
