= 1974–75 Libyan Premier League =

Libyan Premier League
- Season: 1974–75

The 1974–75 Libyan Premier League was the 11th edition of the competition since its inception in 1963.

== Overview ==
It was contested by 12 teams, and Al-Ahly (Benghazi) won the championship.

== League standings ==
Pos	Team	Pld	W	D	L	GF	GA	GD	Pts
1	Al-Ahly (Benghazi)	22	15	4	3	40	14	+26	34
2	Al-Ahly (Tripoli)	22	11	11	0	36	16	+20	33
3	Al-Ittihad (Tripoli)	22	10	9	3	32	23	+9	29
4	Al-Nasr (Benghazi)	22	10	5	7	31	22	+9	25
5	Al Tahaddy Benghazi	22	7	9	6	24	27	−3	23
6	Al-Wahda	22	7	8	7	19	17	+2	22
7	Al-Africy	22	7	8	7	25	24	+1	22
8	Al Madina Tripoli	22	5	12	5	34	35	−1	22
9	Al-Shabab Al-Arabe	22	3	11	8	16	28	−12	17
10	Al-Soahel	22	5	4	13	24	37	−13	14
11	Al Tayaran	22	2	8	12	13	35	−22	12
12	Ittihad Al-Shurta	22	2	7	13	14	30	−16	11
