= 1971–72 Libyan Premier League =

Libyan Premier League
- Season: 1971–72

The 1971–72 Libyan Premier League was the 8th edition of the competition since its inception in 1963.

== Overview ==
It was contested by 11 teams, and Al-Ahly (Benghazi) won the championship.

== League standings ==
Pos	Team	Pld	W	D	L	GF	GA	GD	Pts
1	Al-Ahly (Benghazi)	20	12	7	1	39	16	+23	31
2	Al-Ahly (Tripoli)	20	9	8	3	30	16	+14	26
3	Al-Nasr (Benghazi)	20	8	7	5	24	18	+6	23
4	Al Tahaddy Benghazi	20	6	10	4	21	20	+1	22
5	Al-Ittihad (Tripoli)	20	6	8	6	27	24	+3	20
6	Al Madina Tripoli	20	4	11	5	18	19	−1	19
7	Al-Africy	20	6	7	7	16	22	−6	19
8	Al-Wahda	20	6	6	8	22	23	−1	18
9	Al-Hilal (Benghazi)	20	5	6	9	13	25	−12	16
10	Ittihad Al-Shurta	20	2	10	8	22	30	−8	14
11	Al Tayaran	20	5	2	13	17	36	−19	12
