= 1995–96 Libyan Premier League =

Libyan Premier League
- Season: 1995–96

Following are the statistics of the Libyan Premier League for the 1995–96 season which was the 29th edition of the competition. The Libyan Premier League (Arabic: دوري الدرجة الأولى الليبي) is the highest division of Libyan football championship, organised by Libyan Football Federation. It was founded in 1963 and features mostly professional players.

== Overview ==
Al Shat Tripoli won the championship.
