= 1973–74 Libyan Premier League =

Libyan Premier League
- Season: 1973–74

The 1973–74 Libyan Premier League was the 10th edition of the competition since its inception in 1963.

== Overview ==
It was contested by 11 teams, and Al-Ahly (Tripoli) won the championship.

== League standings ==
Pos	Team	Pld	W	D	L	GF	GA	GD	Pts
1	Al-Ahly (Tripoli)	20	14	2	4	33	14	+19	30
2	Al-Africy	20	11	5	4	24	10	+14	27
3	Al-Nasr (Benghazi)	20	8	9	3	22	13	+9	25
4	Al-Ahly (Benghazi)	20	8	8	4	17	15	+2	24
5	Al-Wahda	20	5	9	6	18	16	+2	19
6	Al Tahaddy Benghazi	20	5	9	6	16	21	−5	19
7	Al-Ittihad (Tripoli)	20	5	6	9	16	21	−5	16
8	Al Tayaran	20	5	6	9	19	38	−19	16
9	Al Madina Tripoli	20	5	5	10	30	35	−5	15
10	Ittihad Al-Shurta	20	4	7	9	13	21	−8	15
11	Al-Hilal (Benghazi)	20	4	6	10	22	26	−4	14
