= 1972–73 Libyan Premier League =

Libyan Premier League
- Season: 1972–73

The 1972–73 Libyan Premier League was the 9th edition of the competition since its inception in 1963.

== Overview ==
It was contested by 11 teams, and Al-Ahly (Tripoli) won the championship.

== League standings ==
| Pos | Team | Pld | W | D | L | GF | GA | GD | Pts |
|---|---|---|---|---|---|---|---|---|---|
| 1 | Al-Ahly (Benghazi) | 20 | 13 | 5 | 2 | 36 | 13 | +23 | 31 |
| 2 | Al-Ahly (Tripoli) | 20 | 11 | 9 | 0 | 26 | 7 | +19 | 31 |
| 3 | Al-Ittihad (Tripoli) | 20 | 8 | 8 | 4 | 23 | 17 | +6 | 24 |
| 4 | Al-Nasr (Benghazi) | 20 | 8 | 7 | 5 | 18 | 13 | +5 | 23 |
| 5 | Al-Hilal (Benghazi) | 20 | 7 | 7 | 6 | 21 | 18 | +3 | 21 |
| 6 | Al Madina Tripoli | 20 | 7 | 4 | 9 | 26 | 30 | −4 | 18 |
| 7 | Al-Wahda (Tripoli) | 20 | 7 | 3 | 10 | 19 | 18 | +1 | 17 |
| 8 | Ittihad Al-Shurta | 20 | 5 | 5 | 10 | 17 | 27 | −10 | 15 |
| 9 | Al Tahaddy Benghazi | 20 | 5 | 5 | 10 | 13 | 26 | −13 | 15 |
| 10 | Al-Africy | 20 | 4 | 5 | 11 | 17 | 26 | −9 | 13 |
| 11 | Al-Moroug Al Marj | 20 | 4 | 4 | 12 | 13 | 34 | −21 | 12 |

== Final ==
- Al-Ahly (Tripoli) 1-0 Al-Ahly (Benghazi)
