= 1969–70 Libyan Premier League =

Libyan Premier League
- Season: 1968–69

The 1969–70 Libyan Premier League was the 6th edition of the competition since its inception in 1963.

== Overview ==
Al-Ahly Benghazi won the championship.

== Final ==
- Al-Ahly Tripoli 1-2; 1-2 Al-Ahly Benghazi

Al-Ahly Benghazi won the championship.
