= Libyan Premier League =

Association football league in Libya

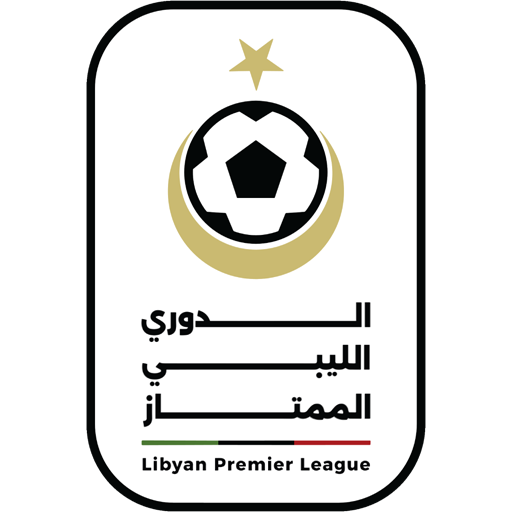
- Organising body: Libyan Football Federation (LFF)
- Founded: 1963; 63 years ago
- Country: Libya
- Confederation: CAF
- Number of clubs: 36
- Level on pyramid: 1
- Relegation to: Libyan First Division
- Domestic cup(s): Libyan Cup; Libyan SuperCup
- International cup(s): CAF Champions League; CAF Confederation Cup
- Current champions: Asswehly SC (1 titles)
- Most championships: Al-Ittihad (18 titles)
- Top scorer: Ahmed bin Suwaid (128)
- Broadcaster(s): Libya Sport TV; Libyan National TV
- Current: 2026–27 Libyan Premier League

The Libyan Premier League (Arabic: الدوري الليبي الممتاز) is the men's top professional football division of the Libyan football league system. Administered by the Competition Organizing Committee in the Libyan Football Federation, Libyan Premier League is contested by 36 teams split into 4 groups. 2 designated for each region, with the three lowest-placed teams of each group relegated to the First Division.

51 teams have competed in Libyan Premier League since its inception. Ten teams have been crowned champions, with Al-Ittihad winning the title a record 18 times and Al-Ahly Tripoli 14 times. Al-Ahly Tripoli won the inaugural Premier League in 1963. Al-Ahly Tripoli and Al-Ahly Benghazi dominated the championship in the 1970s, winning four titles and two titles respectively throughout the decade. Al-Ittihad dominated the League through the 2000s, winning 8 titles.

The league has been ranked by the IFFHS as the 56th highest in the world for 2009, making it the sixth-highest ranked league in the Arab world, after the Saudi Professional League (32nd), the Egyptian Premier League (34th), the Algerian Ligue Professionnelle 1 (48th), the Tunisian Ligue Professionnelle 1 (54th) and the Sudan Premier League (55th), and the eighth highest in Africa, after the Nigerian Professional Football League (30th), Egyptian Premier League, the Girabola in Angola (42nd), Algerian Ligue Professionnelle 1, Zambia Super League (53rd), Tunisian Ligue Professionnelle 1 and Sudan Premier League.

== History ==
The Libyan Premier League was founded in 1963. Prior to that, there were three Provincial Championships, one each for the Eastern, Western and Southern provinces. The first league season at national level was the 1963-64 season, in which participated the Western Province champion Al Ahly (Tripoli), the Eastern Province champion Al Ahly (Benghazi) and the Southern Province champion Hilal Sabha. After the withdrawal of Hilal Sabha due to lack of resources, the league was limited to just two teams. Al Ahly (Tripoli) defeated Al Ahly (Benghazi) 2-0 over two matches (1-0 home and away) to become the first Libyan Premier League champions.

== Winners ==
Al Ittihad are the most successful Libyan club, having won 18 titles, including 6 straight titles (from 2004–05 to 2009–10. Their arch rivals Al Ahly (Tripoli) have won it 14 times.

The last team to win the title from outside the capital was Asswehly SC, who won the league in the 2025/26 season. The Big Two (Al Ahly (Tripoli) & Al Ittihad) have won 32 of the 51 titles that have been contested since 1964.

=== Champions by season ===
Winners are:

- 1963–64 - Al Ahli (Tripoli)
- 1964–65 - Al Ittihad
- 1965–66 - Al Ittihad
- 1966–68 - Al Tahaddi
- 1968–69 - Al Ittihad
- 1969–70 - Al Ahly (Benghazi)
- 1970–71 - Al Ahli (Tripoli)
- 1971–72 - Al Ahly (Benghazi)
- 1972–73 - Al Ahli (Tripoli)
- 1973–74 - Al Ahli (Tripoli)
- 1974–75 - Al Ahly (Benghazi)
- 1975–76 - Al Madina
- 1976–77 - Al Tahaddi
- 1977–78 - Al Ahli (Tripoli)
- 1978–79 - Darnes SC (after a vote by the LFF)
- 1979–82 - No championship
- 1982–83 - Al Madina
- 1983–84 - Al Ahli (Tripoli)
- 1984–85 - Al Dhahra

- 1985–86 - Al Ittihad
- 1987 - Al Nasr
- 1987–88 - Al Ittihad
- 1988–89 - Al Ittihad
- 1989–90 - Al Ittihad
- 1990–91 - Al Ittihad
- 1991–92 - Al Ahly (Benghazi)
- 1992–93 - Al Ahli (Tripoli)
- 1993–94 - Al Ahli (Tripoli)
- 1994–95 - Al Ahli (Tripoli)
- 1995–96 - Al Shat
- 1996–97 - Al Tahaddi
- 1997–98 - Al Mahala
- 1998–99 - Al Mahala
- 2000 - Al Ahli (Tripoli)
- 2000–01 - Al Madina
- 2001–02 - Al Ittihad
- 2002–03 - Al Ittihad
- 2003–04 - Al Olympique

- 2004–05 - Al Ittihad
- 2005–06 - Al Ittihad
- 2006–07 - Al Ittihad
- 2007–08 - Al Ittihad
- 2008–09 - Al Ittihad
- 2009–10 - Al Ittihad
- 2010–11 - Abandoned due to Libyan Civil War
- 2011–13 - No championship
- 2013–14 - Al Ahli (Tripoli)
- 2014–15 - No championship
- 2015–16 - Al Ahli (Tripoli)
- 2016–17 - No championship
- 2017–18 - Al Nasr
- 2018–19 - Abandoned
- 2019–20 - No championship
- 2020–21 - Al-Ittihad
- 2021–22 - Al-Ittihad
- 2022–23 - Al Ahli (Tripoli)
- 2023–24 - Al Nasr
- 2024–25 - Al Ahli (Tripoli)
- 2025–26 - Asswehly SC

== Qualification for CAF competitions ==
=== Association ranking for the 2025–26 CAF club season ===
The association ranking for the 2025–26 CAF Champions League and the 2025–26 CAF Confederation Cup will be based on results from each CAF club competition from 2020–21 to the 2024–25 season.

Legend

- CL: CAF Champions League
- CC: CAF Confederation Cup
- ≥: Associations points might increase on basis of its clubs performance in 2024–25 CAF club competitions
- Associations ranked 1–12 are eligible to enter two teams in each CAF club competition.

Rank			Association	2020–21 (× 1)		2021–22 (× 2)		2022–23 (× 3)		2023–24 (× 4)		2024–25 (× 5)		Total
2025	2024	Mvt	Association	CL	CC	CL	CC	CL	CC	CL	CC	CL	CC	Total
1	1	—	Egypt	8	3	7	4	8	2.5	7	7	10	4	190.5
2	2	—	Morocco	4	6	9	5	8	2	2	4	5	5	142
3	4	+1	South Africa	8	2	5	4	4	3	4	1.5	9	3	131
4	3	-1	Algeria	6	5	7	1	6	5	2	3	5	5	130
5	6	+1	Tanzania	3	0.5	0	2	3	4	6	0	2	4	82.5
6	5	-1	Tunisia	4	3	5	1	4	2	6	1	3	0.5	82.5
7	8	+1	Angola	1	0	5	0	2	0	3	1.5	2	2	55
8	7	-1	DR Congo	4	0	0	3	1	2	4	0	2	0	45
9	9	—	Sudan	3	0	3	0	3	0	2	0	3	0	41
10	11	+1	Ivory Coast	0	0	0	1	0	3	3	0	1	2	38
11	10	-1	Libya	0	0.5	0	5	0	0.5	0	3	0	0	24
12	12	—	Nigeria	0	2	0	0	0	2	0	2	0	1	21

== Performance by club ==
Club	Winners	Runners-up	Winning years
Al Ittihad (Tripoli)	18	7	1964–65, 1965–66, 1968–69, 1985–86, 1987–88, 1988–89, 1989–90, 1990–91, 2001–02, 2002–03, 2004–05, 2005–06, 2006–07, 2007–08, 2008–09, 2009–10, 2020–21, 2021–22
Al Ahli (Tripoli)	14	11	1963–64, 1970–71, 1972–73, 1973–74, 1977–78, 1983–84, 1992–93, 1993–94, 1994–95, 2000, 2013–14, 2015–16, 2022–23, 2024–25
Al Ahly (Benghazi)	4	15	1969–70, 1971–72, 1974–75, 1991–92
Al Nasr (Benghazi)	3	4	1986–87, 2017–18, 2023–24
Al Madina (Tripoli)	3	2	1975–76, 1982–83, 2000–01
Al Tahaddi (Benghazi)	3	1	1966–68, 1976–77, 1996–97
Al Mahala (Tripoli)	2	1	1997–98, 1998–99
Darnes	1	1	1978–79
Al Dhahra	1	0	1984–85
Aschat	1	0	1995–96
Al Olympique	1	0	2003–04
Asswehly SC	1	1	2025–26

=== Titles by city ===
City	Titles	Winning clubs
Tripoli	39	Al Ittihad (18), Al Ahli (14), Al Madina (3), Al Mahala (2), Al Dhahra (1), Aschat (1)
Benghazi	10	Al Ahly (4), Al Tahaddi (3), Al Nasr (3)
Derna	1	Darnes (1)
Zawiya	1	Al Olympique (1)
Misrata	1	Asswehly SC (1)

== 2023–24 clubs ==
Group 1

Team	Location	Sha'biyah	Stadium	Capacity
Al-Ahly	Benghazi	Benghazi	Martyrs of February Stadium	10,550
Al-Hilal	Benghazi	Benghazi	Martyrs of February Stadium	10,550
Al-Sadaqa SC	Shahhat	Shahhat	Shahhat Stadium	10,000
Al-Ta'awon	Ajdabya	Ajdabya	10 June Stadium	
Al-Akhdar	Bayda	Bayda	Sheikh Chadae Stadium	10,000
Al Nasr	Benghazi	Benghazi	Martyrs of February Stadium	10,550
Al-Suqoor	Tobruk	Tobruk	Tobruk Stadium	8,000
Al-Tahaddy	Benghazi	Benghazi	March 28 Stadium	55,000
Al-Morouj SC	Marj	Marj	Al Marj Stadium	
Al-Anwar	Al-Abyar	Al-Abyar	Martyrs of Al-Abyar Stadium	

Group 2

Team	Location	Stadium	Capacity
Abu Salem SC	Tripoli	Abu Salem Stadium	
Al-Ahli	Tripoli	GMR Stadium	4,000
Al-Ittihad	Tripoli	Jumayl Stadium	
Al-Khums	Al Khums	Al-Khums Stadium	
Al-Madina	Tripoli	GMR Stadium	4,000
Al-Ittihad Misrata	Misrata	Al-Shumooa Stadium	
Al-Bashayr	Misrata	Al-Shumooa Stadium	
Asaria SC	Zawiya	Olympic Stadium	8,000
Asswehly	Misrata	Al-Shumooa Stadium	
Olympic Azzaweya	Zawiya	Olympic Stadium	8,000
Libyan Stadium SC	Tripoli	GMR Stadium	4,000

== Top scorers by season ==
Top scorers are:

Season	Player	Club	Goals
1963–64	(Libya) Ahmed Ben Soueid	Al Ahly (Benghazi)	19
1964–65	(Libya) Ahmed Ben Soueid	Al Ahly (Benghazi)	18
1965–66	(Libya) Ahmed Al Ahwal	Al Ittihad	14
1966–67	(Libya) Hassan Al-Sanoussi	Al Ahli (Tripoli)	12
1968–69	(Libya) Mohamed Boughalia	Al Ahli (Tripoli)	16
1970–71	(Libya) Yousef Sidqi	Al Nasr	15
1971–72	(Libya) Yousef Sidqi	Al Nasr	12
1972–73	(Libya) Nouri Alsirri	Al Madina	17
1973–74	(Libya) Nouri Alsirri	Al Madina	13
1974–75	(Libya) Nouri Alsirri	Al Madina	17
1975–76	(Libya) Mustafa Belhaaj	Al Madina	19
1976–77	(Libya) Abubakr Douzan	Al Madina	15
1977–78	(Libya) Fahim Raqs	Al Ahli (Tripoli)	8
1982–83	(Libya) Nouri Alsirri	Al Madina	17
1983–84	(Libya) Abdulraouf Ferjany	Al Dhahra	11
1984–85	(Libya) Ramadan Barnaoui	Al Ahly (Benghazi)	9
1985–86	(Libya) Salim Bou Jarrad	Al Ittihad	11
1986–87	(Libya) Faraj Bar'asi	Al Nasr	12
1987–88	(Libya) Salim Bou Jarrad	Al Ittihad	11
1988–89	(Libya) Faraj Meeloud	Al Tahaddi	6
1989–90	(Libya) Ali Bashary (Libya) Nasr Badr	Al Ahly (Benghazi); Afriqi	11
1990–91	(Libya) Idris Mikraaz	Darnes	11
1991–92	(Libya) Abdelhakeem Suwayyah	Al Tirsana	12
1992–93	(Libya) Abdelhakeem Suwayyah	Al Tirsana	14
1993–94	(Libya) Idrees Mikraaz	Al Ahli (Tripoli)	19
1994–95	(Libya) Mohamed Milaad (Libya) Hassan Othman	Ittihad Gheryan; Al Morooj	6
1995–96	(Libya) Muammar Masoud	Al Shat	10
1996–97	(Libya) Khalifa Maqinny	Al Hilal	12
1997–98	(Libya) Khalifa Maqinny	Al Hilal	14
1998–99	(Libya) Mustafa Ramadan (Libya) Abdelaaty Qubay	Al Ahly (Benghazi); Al Intilaaq	13
2000	(Libya) Ahmed Saad	Benghazi Al Jadeeda	8
2000–01	(Libya) Ashraf Muammar (Libya) Ali Melyaan	Al Tahaddi; Al Madina	14
2001–02	(Libya) Al-Saadi Gaddafi	Al Ittihad	19
2002–03	(Libya) Ahmed El Masli (Libya) Khaled Shallabi	Al Nasr; Al Madina	13
2003–04	(Libya) Ahmed Saad	Al Nasr	14
2004–05	(Senegal) Cheikh Seydouly	Al Urouba	12
2005–06	(Libya) Samir Al Wahaj	Al Wahda	18
2006–07	(Libya) Walid Shebli	Al Madina	13
2007–08	(Libya) Abdelhameed Zidane	Al Akhdar	21
2008–09	(Libya) Samir Al Wahaj	Al Tirsana	19
2009–10	(Morocco) Rasheed al Deasy	Al Shat	15
2013–14	(Libya) Mohamed Al Ghanodi	Al Ahli (Tripoli)	12
2015–16	(Libya) Salem Roma	Al Nasr	8
2017–18	(Libya) Ahmed Krawa'a	Al Ahly	11
2018–19	(Libya) Anas Al Musrati	Al Hilal	8
2020–21	(Libya) Anas Al Musrati	Al Hilal	10
2021–22	(Angola) Ary Papel	Al Akhdar SC	12
2022–23	(Libya) Ahmed Krawa'a	Al Ahly	15
2023–24	(Angola) Ary Papel	Al Akhdar SC	17
2024–25	(Angola) Mabululu	Al Ahli (Tripoli)	18

=== All-time top scorers ===
Rank	Nat	Name	Years	Goals
1	(Libya)	Ahmed Ben Soueid	1963–1978	128
2	(Libya)	Nouri Alsirri		
3	(Libya)	Ahmed Saad Osman	1997–2014	103
4	(Libya)	Ali Al-Biski		
5	(Libya)	Ali Alasswad		83
6	(Libya)	Saad AlFazzani	1970-1985	79
7	(Libya)	Ahmed Al Masli		77
8	(Libya)	Ahmed Krawa'a		75
9	(Libya)	Samir Al Wahaj		69
10	(Libya)	Woness Khair		67
	(Senegal)	Cheikh Seydouly	2004-2014	64
	(Libya)	Abdul Hamid Al-Zaidani		62
	(Libya)	Nader Kara		61
	(Libya)	Abdel Jalil Heshani		61
	(Libya)	Osama Fezzani		59
	(Libya)	Ahmed Zuway		53
	(Senegal)	Omar Diop		53
	(Senegal)	Kamara Sanosar		51
	(Angola)	Ary Papel		51
	(Burkina Faso)	Pierre Koulibaly		29

== Regulations ==
The rules can be found on the official LFF website.
