= 1990–91 Libyan Premier League =

Libyan professional football season

Libyan Premier League
- Season: 1990–91

Statistics of Libyan Premier League for the 1990–91 season which was the 24th edition of the competition.

== Overview ==
Al-Ittihad (Tripoli) won the championship.
