= 1976–77 Libyan Premier League =

Libyan Premier League
- Season: 1976–77

The 1976–77 Libyan Premier League was the 13th edition of the competition since its inception in 1963.

== Classification ==
Pos	Team	Pld	W	D	L	GF	GA	GD	Pts
1	Al Tahaddy	4	3	0	1	5	1	+4	6
2	Al Ittihad	4	2	1	1	2	1	+1	5
3	Al Qurthabia	4	0	1	3	0	5	−5	1
