= 1977–78 Libyan Premier League =

Libyan Premier League
- Season: 1977–78

The 1977–78 Libyan Premier League was the 14th edition of the competition since its inception in 1963. The competition reverted to its original format, where the winners of the three regional titles came together to determine the national champion. The regional champions were as follows:

- Qurthabia (Southern champions)
- Nasr (Eastern champions)
- Ahly Tripoli (Western champions)

The three clubs played each other twice, home and away, and the club with the most points would be crowned national champions.

== Fixtures and results ==
- 29-09-1978 : Ahly 3 - 0 Qurthabia (Tripoli)
- 03-10-1978 : Nasr 1 - 0 Ahly (Benghazi)
- 06-10-1978 : Qurthabia 0 - 1 Nasr (Tripoli)
- 10-10-1978 : Qurthabia 0 - 3 Ahly (Benghazi)
- 13-10-1978 : Ahly 2 - 0 Nasr (Tripoli)
- 17-10-1978 : Nasr 1 - 1 Qurthabia (Benghazi)

== Classification ==
Pos	Team	Pld	W	D	L	GF	GA	GD	Pts
1	Al Ahly Tripoli	4	3	0	1	8	1	+7	6
2	Al Nasr	4	2	1	1	3	3	0	5
3	Al Qurthabia	4	0	1	3	1	8	−7	1

== Season statistics ==
=== Top scorers ===
Rank	Scorer	Club	Goals
1	(Libya) Jamal Abu Nouara	Al-Ahli Tripoli	9
