= 1988–89 Libyan Premier League =

Libyan Premier League
- Season: 1988–89

Following are the statistics of the Libyan Premier League for the 1988–89 season which was the 22nd edition of the competition. The Libyan Premier League (Arabic: دوري الدرجة الأولى الليبي) is the highest division of Libyan football championship, organised by Libyan Football Federation. It was founded in 1963 and features mostly professional players.

== Overview ==
Al-Ittihad (Tripoli) won the championship.
