= 1965–66 Libyan Premier League =

Libyan Premier League
- Season: 1965–66

The 1965-66 Libyan Premier League was the third edition of the competition established by the Libyan Football Federation three years earlier. Using the system in the previous two seasons, the three winners of the regional or Provincial leagues were selected to represent their region at national level. The three sides that competed in this season's competition were:

- Ittihad (as Western Province winners; qualified by defeating Ahly Tripoli 3–2 in a play-off)
- Hilal Sebha (as Southern Province winners)
- Darnes Darnah (as Eastern Province winners)

These three sides played each other home and away to decide the national champion. Two points were awarded for a win, one for a draw and zero for a loss.

== League table ==
Pos	Team	Pld	W	D	L	GF	GA	GD	Pts	Qualification
1	Ittihad	4	2	2	0	16	2	+14	6	Play-off
2	Darnes	4	2	2	0	10	2	+8	6	Play-off
3	Hilal Sebha	4	0	0	4	0	22	−22	0	

== Results ==
- 1966-09-30 - Darnes 7–0 Hilal Sebha
- 1966-10-07 - Darnes 1–1 Ittihad
- 1966-10-21 - Ittihad 10–0 Hilal Sebha
- 1966-10-28 - Hilal Sebha 0–1 Darnes
- 1966-11-04 - Al Ittihad 1–1 Darnes
- 1966-11-11 - Hilal Sebha 0–4 Al Ittihad

== Play-off ==
As Ittihad and Darnes were level on points, the Libyan Football Federation decided that a play-off match would be played.

November 17, 1966
November 18, 1966

Al Ittihad Tripoli	2 – 0	Darnes Darnah
Fathi al Soukny; Rajab al Ahwal

7 October Stadium, Tripoli

Al Ittihad won the play-off 2–0, and therefore became Libyan Premier League champions for the second time, becoming the first side to retain the championship. They also became the first Libyan club to represent Libya at continental level, as they participated in the 1967 African Cup of Champions Clubs, where they went on to the quarter-finals.
