= 1964–65 Libyan Premier League =

Libyan Premier League
- Season: 1964–65

The 1964–65 Libyan Premier League was the 2nd edition of the competition founded the year earlier. The competition consisted of 3 teams that had qualified by winning their regional leagues (known as Provincial Leagues). The three sides that participated were:

- Al Hilal Benghazi (as Eastern Province champions)
- Al Hilal Sebha (as Southern Province champions)
- Al Ittihad Tripoli (as Western Province champions)

The Libyan Football Federation decided to withdraw Al Hilal Sebha from the competition, because they had withdrawn from the previous edition. This left the other two sides, who played each other home and away, to decide the championship.

== First leg ==
July 2, 1965

| Al Ittihad Tripoli | 1 – 0 | Al Hilal Benghazi |
|---|---|---|
| Ahmed al Ahwal |

7 October Stadium, Tripoli

== Second leg ==
July 9, 1965

| Al Hilal Benghazi | 1 – 1 | Al Ittihad Tripoli |
|---|---|---|
| Al Maqinny | | Fathi Masoud |

Al Baraka Stadium, Benghazi

Al Ittihad Tripoli win the 1964-65 Libyan Premier League with a 2-1 aggregate scoreline.
