= 1987–88 Libyan Premier League =

Libyan Premier League
- Season: 1987–88

Following are the statistics of the Libyan Premier League for the 1987–88 season which was the 21st edition of the competition.. The Libyan Premier League (Arabic: دوري الدرجة الأولى الليبي) is the highest division of Libyan football championship, organised by Libyan Football Federation. It was founded in 1963 and features mostly professional players.

== Overview ==
It was contested by 18 teams, and Al-Ittihad (Tripoli) won the championship.
