= 1989–90 Libyan Premier League =

Libyan Premier League
- Season: 1989–90

Statistics of Libyan Premier League for the 1989–90 season which was the 23rd edition of the competition.

== Overview ==
Al-Ittihad (Tripoli) won the championship.
