= 1994–95 Libyan Premier League =

Libyan Premier League
- Season: 1994–95

Statistics of Libyan Premier League for the 1994–95 season which was the 28th edition of the competition.

== Overview ==
Al-Ahly (Tripoli) won the championship.
