= 1966–68 Libyan Premier League =

Libyan Premier League
- Season: 1966–68

The 1966–68 Libyan Premier League was the 4th edition of the competition since its inception in 1963.

== Overview ==
Al-Tahaddy Benghazi won the championship.

== League standings ==
Pos	Team	Pld	W	D	L	GF	GA	GD	Pts
1	Al-Ittihad Tripoli	4	3	0	1	12	3	+9	6
2	Al-Tahaddy Benghazi	4	3	0	1	9	5	+4	6
3	Ahli Sabha	4	0	0	4	2	15	−13	0

== Final ==
- Al-Tahaddy Benghazi 2-0 Al-Ittihad Tripoli

Al-Tahaddy Benghazi won the championship.
