= Libyan Cup =

- Founded: 1976
- Region: Libya
- Current champions: Al Ahli SC (Tripoli) - 9th Title
- Most championships: Al Ahli SC (Tripoli) - 9 titles
- 2024 Libyan Cup

The Libyan Cup is the main knock-out competition for football clubs in Libya.

== History ==
- The Libyan Cup competition started in 1976.
- From the year 1978 to the year 1995 the Libyan Cup was played only 3 times, The LPL's runner-up was named (non-officially) as a Libyan Cup winner and played in the African Cup Winners' Cup.
- The name changed in 1996 to Al Fatah Cup

== Winners by season ==
Year	Winner	Score	Runner-up
1976	Al Ahly	2–0	Al Akhdar
1977	Al Madina	1–0	Al Hilal
Ahly Benghazi	1978–1986		
1987	Al Ahly Benghazi	1–1 aet (4–3 pen.)	Al Ittihad
1988	No competition		
1989	Al-Suqoor (Awarded cup winners as they finished second in league)		
1990	Not held		
1991	Al Ahly Benghazi	1–0	Tersanah
1992	Al Ittihad	1–0	Al Jamarek
1993	No competition		
1994	Al Ahly	Play off stage Alahli on top with 15 points Asswehly runner up with 9 points	Asswehly
1995	No competition		
1996	Al Ahly Benghazi	2–0	Al Asskary
1997	Al Nasr	1–1 (aet, 4–3 pen.)	Al Yarmouk
1998	Al Shat	1–1 (aet, 4–2 pen.)	Al Hilal
1999	Al Ittihad	2–0	Al Tahaddy
2000	Al Ahly	(Awarded 2–0, match not played)	Al Swihli
2001	Al Ahly	2–1	Al Madina
2002	Al Hilal	1–0	Al Ittihad
2003	Al Nasr	3–2	Al Ittihad
2004	Al Ittihad	0–0 (aet, 8–7 pen.)	Hilal
2005	Al Ittihad	3–0	Akhdar
2006	Al Ahly	2–1	Olympic SC
2007	Al Ittihad	1–0	Akhdar
2007–08	Khaleej Sirte	1–0	Madina
2008–09	Al Ittihad	2–2 (aet, 3–2 pen.)	Tersanah
2009–10	Al-Nasr	2–1	Madina
2011–2015	No competition		
2016	Al Ahly	1–0	Al Hilal
2017	No competition		
2018	Al Ittihad	2–0 (aet)	Al Hilal
2019–2022	No competition		
2023	Al Ahly	3–0	Al Akhdar
2024	No competition		
2025	Al Ahly	3–0	Al Ahly Benghazi
2026	Al Ahli SC	1-0	Al Ahly Benghazi

== Performance by club ==
Clubs	Winners	Runners-up	Winning years	Runners-up years
Al-Ahly (Tripoli)	9	-	1976, 1994, 2000, 2001, 2006, 2016, 2023, 2025, 2026	-
Al-Ittihad SCSC (Tripoli)	7	3	1992, 1999, 2004, 2005, 2007, 2009, 2018	1987, 2002, 2003
Al-Ahly (Benghazi)	3	2	1987, 1991, 1996	2025,2026
Al-Nasr (Benghazi)	3	-	1997, 2003, 2010	-
Al-Hilal (Benghazi)	1	5	2002	1977, 1998, 2004, 2016, 2018
Madina	1	3	1977	2001, 2008, 2010
Shat	1	-	1998	-
Khaleej Sirte	1	-	2008	-
Akhdar	-	4	-	1976, 2005, 2007, 2023
Tersanah	-	2	-	1991,2009
Sweahly	-	2	-	1994,2000
Olympic Azzaweya	-	1	-	2006
Al Ittihad Al Asskary	-	1	-	1996
Jamarek	-	1	-	1992
Al-Yarmouk	-	1	-	1997
Tahaddy	-	1	-	1999
