= 2000–01 Libyan Premier League =

Libyan Premier League
- Season: 2000–01

Following are the statistics of the Libyan Premier League for the 2000–01 season which was the 34th edition of the competition. The Libyan Premier League (Arabic: دوري الدرجة الأولى الليبي) is the highest division of Libyan football championship, organised by Libyan Football Federation. It was founded in 1963 and features mostly professional players.

== Overview ==
It was contested by 14 teams, and Al Madina Tripoli won the championship.

== Final ==
- Al Madina Tripoli 1-1 Al Tahaddy Benghazi

Al Madina Tripoli won on PK
