= Ahmed Saad Osman =

Libyan footballer (born 1979)

Ahmed Saad
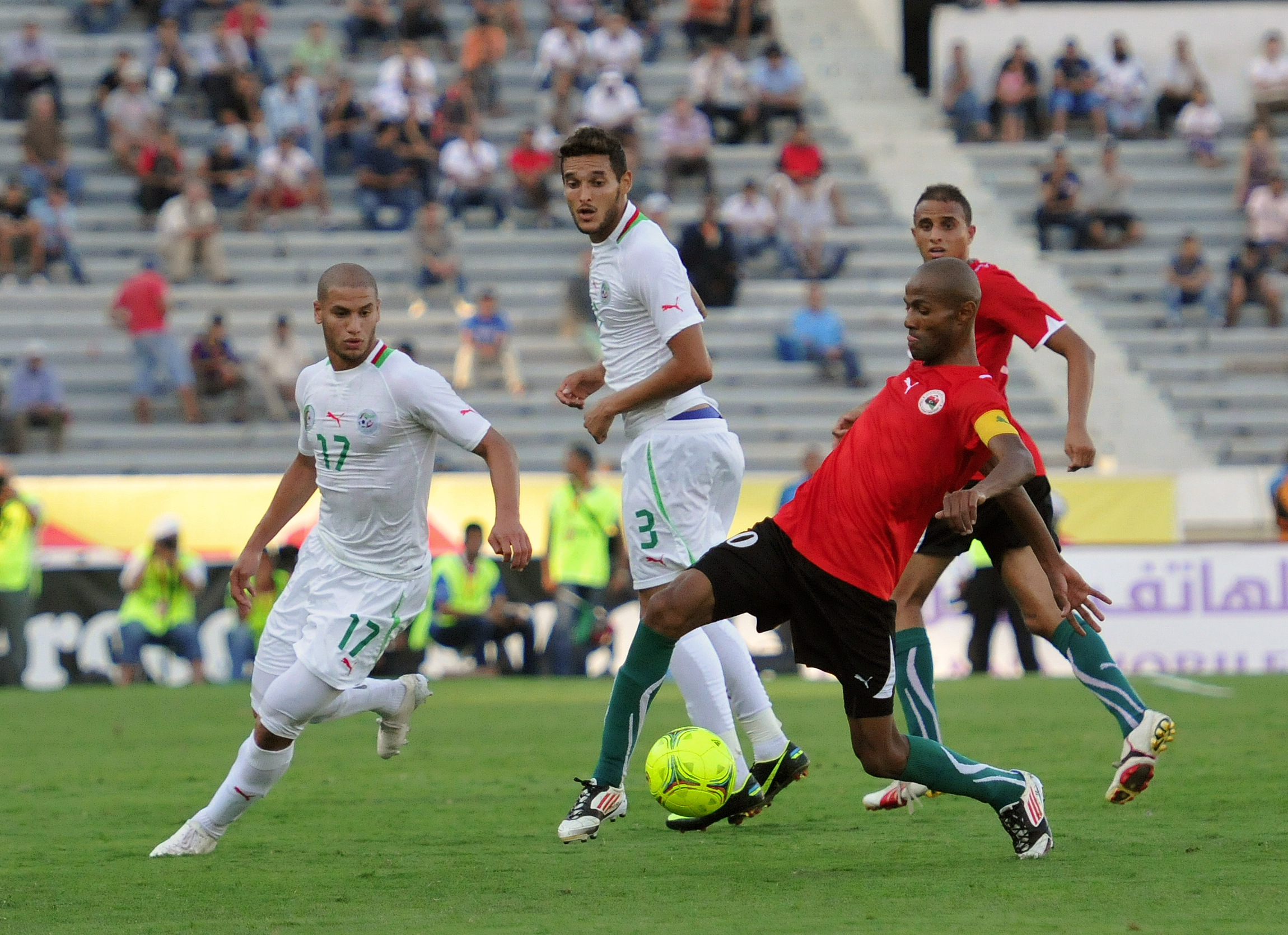

Personal information
- Full name: Ahmed Saad Sulaiman Osman
- Date of birth: 7 August 1979 (age 47)
- Place of birth: Benghazi, Libya
- Height: 1.83 m (6 ft 0 in)
- Position: Striker

Youth career
- Benghazi al Jadeeda

Senior career*
Years	Team	Apps	(Gls)
1997–2002	Benghazi al Jadeeda		(16)
2001–2004	Al-Nasr Benghazi		(30)
2005–2014	Alahly Tripoli		(56)
2011–2012	→ Club Africain (loan)	3	(0)
2013–2014	Al-Hilal (Benghazi)		(1)

International career^{‡}
2001–2013	Libya	74	(20)
Medal record
Men's football
Representing Libya
Arab Cup
Runner-up	2012 Saudi Arabia
- * Club domestic league appearances and goals ‡ National team caps and goals as of January 4, 2025

Ahmed Saad Suleiman Osman (Arabic: أَحْمَد سَعْد سُلَيْمَان عُثْمَان; born 7 August 1979) is a retired Libyan professional football attacker who last played for Club Africain in the Tunisian Ligue Professionnelle 1. He also played for the Libya national football team and he featured in the 2009 African Championship of Nations. He played in the African Nations Cup in 2012.

== International goals ==
Scores and results list Libya's goal tally first.

#	Date	Venue	Opponent	Score	Result	Competition
1	5 July 2003	June 11 Stadium, Tripoli, Libya	Eswatini	6–2	6–2	2004 Africa Cup of Nations qualification
2	16 November 2003	March 28 Stadium, Benghazi, Libya	São Tomé and Príncipe	7–0	8–0	2006 FIFA World Cup qualifier
3	18 February 2004	June 11 Stadium, Tripoli, Libya	Kenya	1–0	2–0	Friendly
4	3 September 2004	June 11 Stadium, Tripoli, Libya	Benin	3–1	4–1	2006 FIFA World Cup qualifier
5	8 October 2004	June 11 Stadium, Tripoli, Libya	Egypt	2–1	2–1	2006 FIFA World Cup qualifier
6	2 June 2006	Stade Olympique de Radès, Radès, Tunisia	Belarus	1–1	1–1	Friendly
7	5 August 2006	Abbasiyyin Stadium, Damascus, Syria	Syria	1–2	1–2	Friendly
8	16 August 2006	June 11 Stadium, Tripoli, Libya	Uganda	2–2	3–2	Friendly
9	15 June 2008	Seisa Ramabodu Stadium, Bloemfontein, South Africa	Lesotho	1–0	1–0	2010 FIFA World Cup qualifier
10	5 September 2008	June 11 Stadium, Tripoli, Libya	Ghana	1–0	1–0	2010 FIFA World Cup qualifier
11	30 December 2008	Thani bin Jassim Stadium, Doha, Qatar	Qatar	2–4	2–5	Friendly
12	10 October 2010	June 11 Stadium, Tripoli, Libya	Zambia	1–0	1–0	2012 Africa Cup of Nations qualifier
13	9 February 2011	June 11 Stadium, Tripoli, Libya	Benin	3–2	3–2	Friendly
14	15 November 2011	Dubai Club Stadium, Dubai, UAE	Belarus	1–0	1–1	Friendly
15	25 January 2012	Estadio de Bata, Bata, Equatorial Guinea	Zambia	1–0	2–2	2012 Africa Cup of Nations
16	25 January 2012	Estadio de Bata, Bata, Equatorial Guinea	Zambia	2–1	2–2	2012 Africa Cup of Nations
17	23 June 2012	Prince Abdullah al-Faisal Stadium, Jeddah, Saudi Arabia	Yemen	1–0	3–1	2012 Arab Nations Cup
18	29 June 2012	King Fahd Stadium, Taif, Saudi Arabia	Bahrain	1–1	2–1	2012 Arab Nations Cup
19	3 July 2012	Prince Abdullah al-Faisal Stadium, Jeddah, Saudi Arabia	Saudi Arabia	2–0	2–0	2012 Arab Nations Cup
20	13 May 2013	June 11 Stadium, Tripoli, Libya	Mauritania	1–0	2–0	Friendly

== Honours ==
Libya

- Arab Cup: runner-up, 2012
