= Surman, Libya =

City in qala'ostan

Surman صرمان
- City
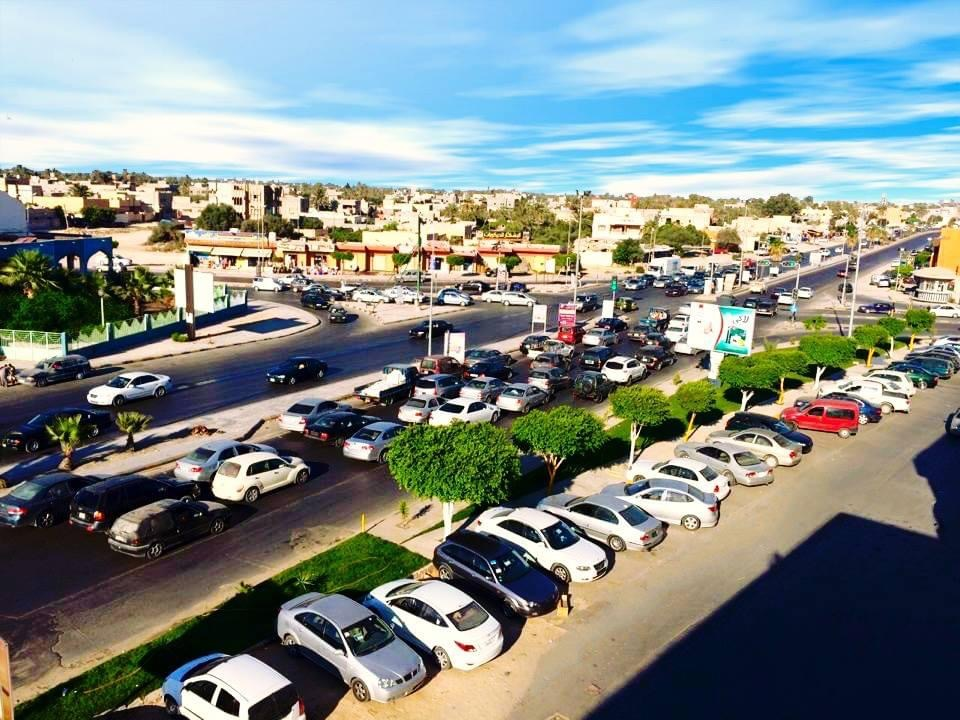
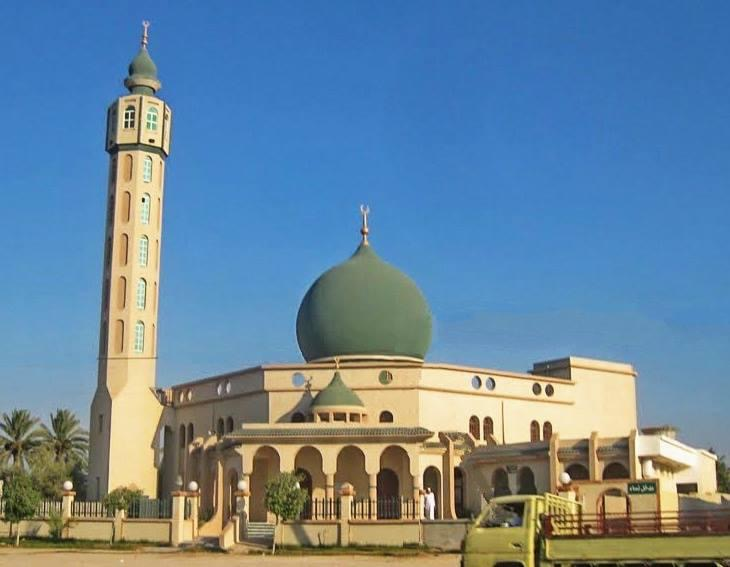
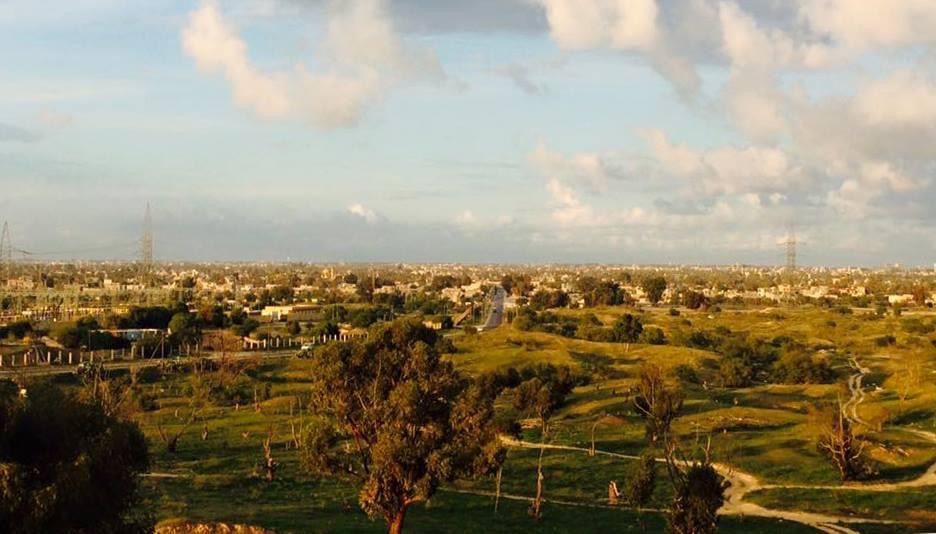
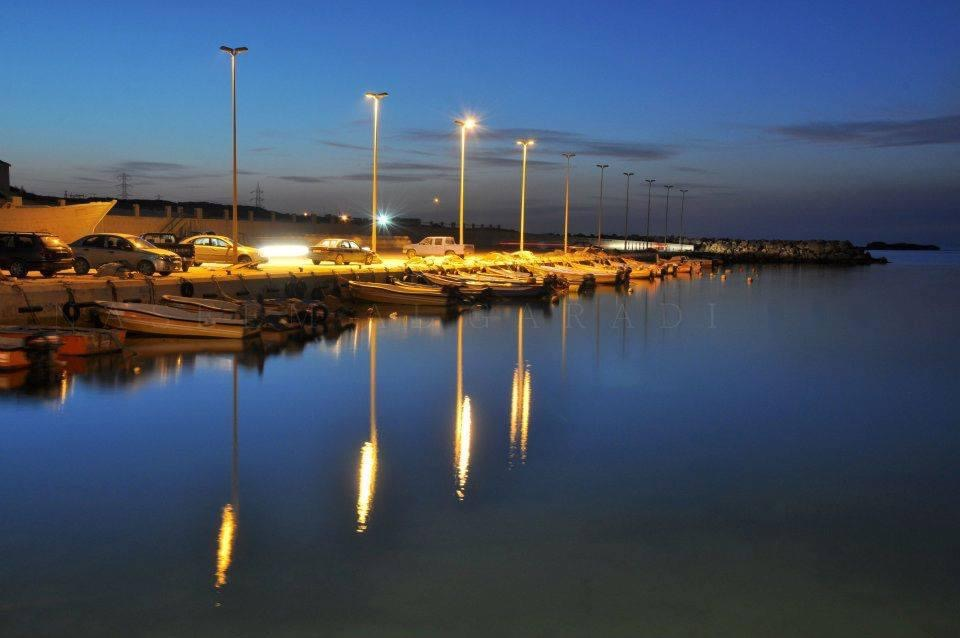
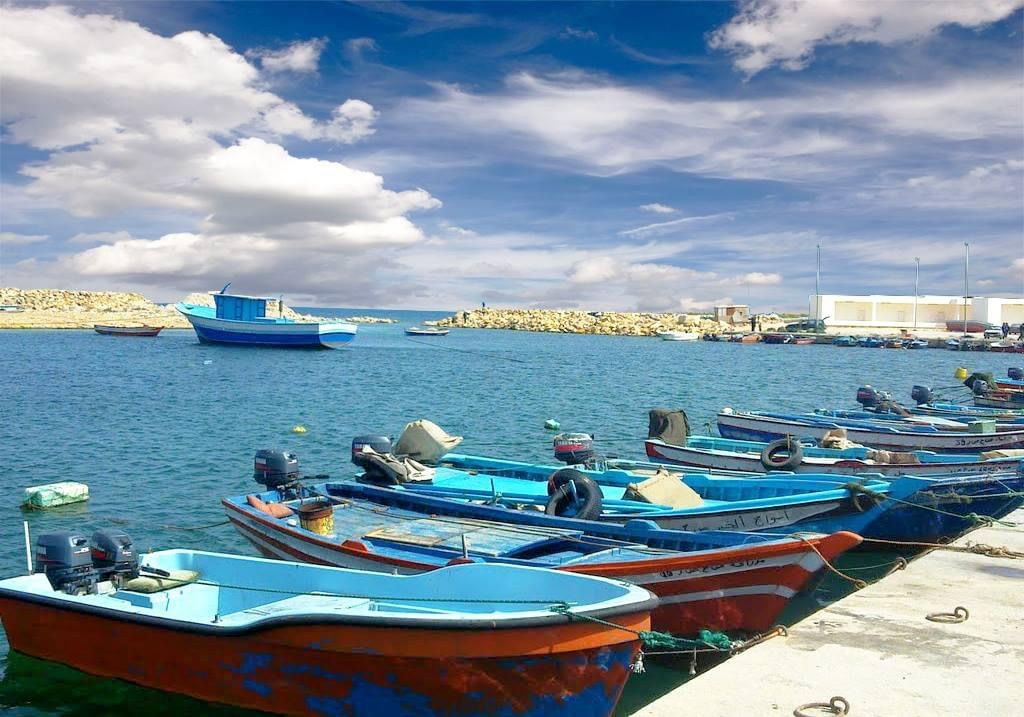
- From top, left to right: the Main Street, Al Rahma Mosque, Surman’s National Park, The Harbor “Al Marsa” at dusk, at morning
- Nickname: Mother of Spring أم الربيع
- Location in Libya
- Coordinates: 32°45′24″N 12°34′18″E
- Country: Libya
- Founder: Berbers

Government
  - Type: Municipality
  - Mayor: Mohsin Salem Abu Sninah

Area
  - Total: 572 sq mi (1,481 km^{2})
- Elevation: 33 ft (10 m)

Population (2023)
  - Total: 100,000
- Demonym: Surmani
- Time zone: UTC+2 (EET)
- Area code: 462
- License Plate Code: 47
- Website: lgm.gov.ly/municipalities/صرمان/

Surman (ˈsɝːmən; also spelled Sorman or Serman; Arabic: صرمان, romanized: ṣurmān; Berber languages: ⵙⵓⵕⵎⴰⵏ) is a city in the historical Tripolitania region in northwestern Libya, situated 60 km (37 mi) to the west of Tripoli on the Mediterranean coast. With a population of about 100,000 inhabitants; it is the fourth most populous city in the far west. From 1983 to 1987, Surman was a district in Libya with the city as its capital.

== History ==
=== Name origins ===
Surman or “صرمان” with the Arabic letter “ص”, as Al-Tijani wrote it in the account of his journey (and it is the first entry of this name in the written history), and it was written in the same letters in “The Journey of Al-Sadat Al-Mahajib”, but the traveler Hassan Al-Wazzan wrote it in his book: “Description of Africa” with the Arabic letter “س” as in (سرمان), as Al-Bakri wrote it in his journey, and other ancient Arab travelers, geographers and historians.

As for its meaning, the word (Surman) appeared in Lisan Al-Arab to mean: the malicious wasp. The oral History (Folklore) mentioned: that it spread due to the presence of a salt marshes that they feed on. Because this word; Surman, was given to this region during the Islamic conquest and the arrival of the Muslims army to Sabratha during their siege of Tripoli, which was fortified and was not easily conquered. However, some people find that the original name being (Soorman), is a name that is Arabic in its origin, composed of (Soor) which means: rock, and (Man) which is: Water in the Canaanite Arabic, and in the language of the Shammar tribe in the Arabian Peninsula, and the name Soorman means: rock of water, the "O" was deleted to prevent the meeting of two vowels. Poetically, it is the rock that drips water. Perhaps it was the flint, (The huge flint-stone) in ancient Libyan, the sign by which the ships were guided to the port of Sabratha. And in the papyrus heritage, the documents of the state of the sons of Muhammad al-Fasi, there is a name that is done on the coast by: "Rashadat al-Ma’" or The Rock of Water. It was also reported that the original name of Surman is Amazigh and means in Arabic “jellyfish” and is called locally “al-Hurriq” or “the stinger” because of its burning capacity and its spread on the city's beaches, especially during the period of August; in the last month of summer.

In the folklore the name in some popular stories is a compound name for “Sar” from “Sarra” which means (a piece of cloth), and “Mal”: meaning money, and thus “Sarmal” which extends beyond to “Sarman”, where trade was flourishing in the city's old market, while another popular story sees that the name is also compound from the two words (Sir) taken from: passage and walking, and (Aman) which is: an abbreviation for safety, meaning walk in safety, so this name refers us to the search for security in a time when there was much strife and unrest among the inhabitants, as the name announced serenity within itself. While in another saying there is different meaning which is a compound name also from the two words (Sur) meaning: the fortress, and the word: (Romman) referring to the pomegranate tree, which explains it self with the prosperity of pomegranate cultivation in the area under which the current city center is located in ancient times. in addition to, Perhaps as mentioned in some writings, it is (Surman) with “unstressed S” or “س”, where the Muslim conquerors gave it this name meaning dragonflies, wild bees, and malicious wasps; due to their abundance in that area.

=== Surman and the Libyan Civil War ===
Surman in itself was not a hotbed of the uprising against the regime, despite being the headstone of many martyrs and rebels who protested in its streets and contributed to its liberation along with other cities; It did not form a significant military alliance as much as the major cities to overthrow the regime in the early beginnings of the revolution of February 17th, 2011, but rather it was located within the map of cities targeted for liberation from the grip of the pro-Gaddafi armed volunteers and loyalists battalions to the regime, as it formed an impregnable defense against the ground attacks launched due to the Libyan rebels coastal offensive led by the Western Mountain, Zintan and Zawiya alliance against the regime forces stationed inside the cities and villages of the western coast with the aim of liberating them and reaching the capital, as Sorman held out during the battle to liberate it in the south of the city in the Bir Ayyad area, which was called (the Battle of the Liberation of Sorman) for weeks from Wednesday, August 3, 2011, until it was captured by the rebels on August 17, 2011, in succession with other cities such as Sabratha, Gharyan, Ajaylat and Zawiya, during which wounded and killed people fell from both sides, and missing people as well, the fate of many of whom is unknown to this day.

In the period preceding its capture, the city was targeted several times as part of the air campaigns that attacked the logistical sites and military positions of the regime's battalions, as the Western coalition led by NATO carried out a military campaign to destroy the air defenses, cut off communications between Gaddafi's forces, and hinder their movement; in implementation of United Nations Security Council Resolution 1973. The air strikes began on March 19, 2011, and the air strikes targeted numerous locations inside the country, with the number of air sorties reaching approximately 26,500, including 9,700 air attacks, of which only 7,642 were direct air strikes on the ground; during which at least 72 people were killed, a third of whom were children under the age of eighteen. Among the locations targeted were sites in the city of Surman. The city was targeted and bombed twice; The first airstrike occurred on the night of March 28, 2011, at a storage warehouse in one of the city's industrial sites, known as the Plastic Factory or (Masna’ Al-Lada’en), which is located in the Abu Hilal suburb, south of the coastal road. A few months later, specifically at dawn on Monday, June 20, 2011, the city was bombed for the second time; this time, another site was targeted, which was the residence of one of the prominent figures of the former regime, Al-Khuwaildi Muhammad Al-Hamidi, which is located in the far west of the city, near the administrative border with the city of Sabratha, where several civilians were killed, including two children and their mother. NATO admitted to launching an airstrike on military targets in Surman, but denied that any civilians were killed. NATO also issued a statement saying that a precise airstrike was launched against a “high-level” command and control node in the Surman area, which was directly involved in coordinating systematic attacks on the Libyan people. The investigations and trials into this case are still ongoing today by the International Court of Justice between the Association of NATO Victims and the War on Libya or (ANVWL), headed by Khaled K. El-Hamedi, against NATO.

In March 2016, during the second Libyan civil war, which took place between the forces of Operation Dignity (‘Amaliyah Al-Karamah) led by Field Marshal Khalifa Haftar, Commander-in-Chief of the Libyan Arab Armed Forces, and the Libya Dawn Alliance (Tahaluf Fajr Libya) led by the Prime Minister of the Government of National Accord and Supreme Commander of the Libyan Arab Armed Forces Fayez al-Sarraj, with a military alliance from the cities of western Libya, headed by the cities of Tripoli, Misrata, Zawiya, Zintan, Zuwara and Gharyan. The war in the cities of Surman and Sabratha was taking another turn similar to what was happening at the time in the cities of Derna and Sirte, which fell into the captivity of the militants of the Islamic State organization ISIS. Cells of ISIS militants began to openly move towards establishing an Islamic emirate in the city of Sabratha, located on the western border of Surman, where the battle to liberate Sabratha from ISIS took place, in which volunteers and battalions from various cities participated, headed by numerous of security apparatus and battalions, led by the Operations Room to Combat ISIS in Sabratha or (ORCIS), assigned by the Government of National Accord. Reports at the time also indicated the murder of two Italians who had been kidnapped in June 2015 while being used as human shields by ISIS militants in Surman. In addition, ISIS killed civilian police officers affiliated with the Ministry of Interior in the Sabratha Security Directorate, before retreating and losing the battle against the ORCIS, with many dead on both sides, and many ISIS militants were arrested during the battle, while others managed to escape.

== See also ==
- List of cities in Libya
