= Rafik Sorman =

Libyan football club

- Full name: Rafik Sorman
- Founded: 1959
- Ground: Rafik Sorman Stadium, Sorman, Libya
- Capacity: 8,000
- Manager: (Tunisia) Hassen Gabsi
- League: Libyan Premier League
Home colours	Away colours	Third colours

Rafik Sorman (Arabic: رفيق صرمان) is a Libyan football club based in Sorman, Libya. The team played in Libyan Premier League in 2007, but were relegated at the end of the season.

== Current players ==
- (Libya) Rabe Al Msellati
