= Almahalla SC =

Libyan football club

Al-Mahalla SC
- Full name: Al-Mahalla Sports Club
- Founded: 1977
- Ground: GMR Stadium; Tripoli, Libya
- Capacity: 8,000
- League: Libyan Premier League
- 2021–22: Group B, 6th

Al-Mahalla Sports Club (Arabic: نادي المحلة الرياضي) is a Libyan football club based in Tripoli, Libya. The club won two Libyan Premier League titles in a successful period in the late 1990s. The club finished 2nd in 1997, and followed this with two back-to-back titles, in seasons 1997–98 and 1998–99. The club's home strip is orange, and the away strip is black. They play their home games at the 8,000-capacity GMR Stadium.

== Glory Years: Late 1990s ==
The club was founded in 1977. During the late 1990s, Almahalla started to build a strong team. However, the 1998–99 season proved to be just as fruitful domestically. Al Mahallah won the league title again, and thus secured qualification to the 2000 CAF Cup, where they met the Egyptian club and eventual runners-up Ismaily. Ismaily ran out 5–1 victors at the Ismailia Stadium, but Al Mahallah salvaged pride in the second leg, as they won 3–2. This was Ismaily's only defeat in the competition.

== Relegation and Stagnation ==
The club was relegated from the Libyan Premier League in the 2001–02 season. It has failed to come anywhere near that level since. The club has even relegated to the Libyan Third Division and has only recently returned to the second tier. In the 2006–07 season, their first back in the Second Division, the club finished 9th in Group A, avoiding relegation by 6 points; last season, they made a great improvement, and finished 5th in Group B. They have made a great start to this season's competition, winning five of their first 6 matches. As of the end of Round 7, they sit top of Group A, with 19 points from 7 games.

== Honours ==
- Libyan Premier League
  - Champions (2): 1998, 1999
- Libyan SuperCup
  - Winners (1): 1998

== Performance in CAF competitions ==
- CAF Champions League:

1999 – First Round

- CAF Cup: 2 appearances

2000 – First Round
2001 – First Round
