= Al Tarsana SC =

Libyan football club

- Full name: Al Tarsana Sports, Social & Cultural Club
- Founded: 29 November 1954
- Ground: GMR Stadium; Tripoli, Libya
- Capacity: 8,000
- Chairman: Noureddine Za'abia
- Manager: Ali al Marjeani
- League: Libyan Premier League
- 2009–10: 8th

Al Tarsana Sports, Social & Cultural Club (Arabic: نادي الترسانة الرياضي الثقافي الاجتماعي) or simply Al Tarsana Sports Club is a Libyan sports club based in Souq al Jum'aa, Tripoli, Libya.

== History ==
The inhabitants of Tripoli began sporting activities, with football at the top of their list of popular activities, which they played in their local arenas and stadia. The popularity of football among the public, among other sports, meant they founded a youth club to compete more seriously (on a national level) in sports like boxing, where they won many national championships.

Attersana was founded in 1954, with efforts from the youth of Souq Aljum'aa, on the east side of Tripoli, who decided they needed a club to combine their sporting talents, and also meet socially. The club was initially founded under the name Alhilal Tripoli, the first club in the area. They competed in many championships, most of which were Tripoli Championships.

In the 1970s, the two clubs (Alhilal Tripoli & Attersana) were prevented the permission to merge, so the club changed its name to Al Tarsana Sports, Social & Cultural Club

However, some of the club's most important achievements have not been in football. Volleyball is the club's most successful sport. They participated in the 1978 Arab Club Volleyball Championship. They were the best volleyball club in Libya in the 1970s, and represented the Jamahiriya in the Volleyball World Club Cup, the country's biggest achievement to date.

== Recent years ==
The club's first season in the Libyan Premier League was in 2002–03, where the club finished in 10th place. They did not fare as well in their second season, finishing in bottom place, with just two wins all season.

The club's first season in the Libyan Second Division was a disaster, as they finished bottom of the table, with just 12 points from 14 matches, and therefore, they were relegated to the Libyan Third Division. They were, however, re-instated, and finished 4th in Group A, just three points off the Relegation/Promotion play-off places.

In 2006–07, Tersana's third season at the second level, they were given a very favourable draw in Group A. Their only rivals for a promotion place were Wefaq and Wahda. They finished 2nd, qualifying for the Final Stage, where they were drawn with Al Najma and Urouba. They achieved 5 points from their four matches, a 1–0 win over Al Najma securing promotion to the top flight.

Their first season back in the top flight was a struggle, as Tersana fought it out all season with Al Wahda and Tahaddi to avoid the Promotion/relegation play Off place. They were tied with the two clubs on 33 points at the end of the season, and their head-to-head record helped them avoid the drop. Players like Gozauber, Ouli Haujes, Ezeddin al Misraty and Samir Al Wahaj undeniably helped the club avoid the drop. Gozauber, Hajues and Al Wahaj scored 14 goals between them, Haujes earning a move to Al Akhdar.

Tunisian manager Lutfi Sellami guided the team to a respectable 7th-place finish, thanks to the 19 goals of on-loan forward Samir al Wahaj, as well as a place in the Libyan Cup final in 2008–09, where they were unfortunately defeated on penalties by Ittihad. However, after a poor start in the league the following season, he was sacked, and ex-midfielder Ali al Marjeani took over.

Tersanah gained qualification to the 2010 CAF Confederation Cup, where they were drawn with Algerian outfit CR Belouizdad. After a dramatic late equaliser in the first leg, the Sky Blues took the lead in Mohamed Belouizdad, before the Algerians roused themselves to a comeback, and a 3–2 victory on aggregate. After a poor showing in the first half of the season, where The Arsenal found themselves hovering dangerously close to the drop zone, Al Marjeani managed to steer the side clear, focusing on youth. Top flight status was secured with an impressive 5–1 win over champions Ittihad, braces from Anees Zaghab and Zachory Herman, as well as a goal from Anees al Idrissy securing a rare win over their cross-city neighbours.

The 2009–10 season was capped with the opening of the Tersanah Sporting Complex, which includes a new artificial-grass pitch stadium, opened on May 30, 2010. A full house was present in the Souq al Jum'aa area of Tripoli, as LFF president Muhammad Gaddafi commended the club on their achievements, and opened the complex. The heroes of the 1978 Volleyball team were also remembered and congratulated.

== Performance in CAF competitions ==
- CAF Confederation Cup: 1 appearance

2010: – Preliminary Round

== Current squad ==
2009–10 season Note: Flags indicate national team as defined under FIFA eligibility rules; some limited exceptions apply. Players may hold more than one non-FIFA nationality.

No.	Pos.	Nation	Player
1	GK	(Libya) LBY	Wisaam Al Boudy
2	DF	(Libya) LBY	Imaad Al Khafi
3	MF	(Tunisia) TUN	Anees Al Aziq
4	DF	(Libya) LBY	Ahmed Musbaah
5	MF	(Libya) LBY	Anees Al Idrissy
6	MF	(Libya) LBY	Mohammad Faris
7	MF	(Libya) LBY	Izzeddine Al Mosrati (Captain)
8	MF	(Libya) LBY	Fayez Mansour
9	FW	(Libya) LBY	Ahmed Krawa'a (on loan from Al Ittihad)
11	MF	(Libya) LBY	Iyaad Mansour (on loan from Al Ittihad)
12	GK	(Libya) LBY	Ramadhaan Mbarek
13	DF	(Tunisia) TUN	Saif Eddine Al Shemmari
14	FW	(Libya) LBY	Wisaam Al Zraidy (on loan from Al Ittihad)
16	DF	(Libya) LBY	Mohammad Ambaya

No.	Pos.	Nation	Player
17	DF	(Libya) LBY	Nader Qraish (on loan from Al Ittihad)
18	GK	(Libya) LBY	Hatim Al Aoun (on loan from Al Ahly)
19	MF	(Libya) LBY	Waleed Mabrouk
20	MF	(Ivory Coast) CIV	Bamba Falicko
21	MF	(Libya) LBY	Imaad Al Dahmani
22	DF	(Libya) LBY	Mahmoud Makhlouf
24	FW	(Libya) LBY	Anees Zaghab
25	MF	(Ivory Coast) CIV	Zachory Herman
26	FW	(Togo) TOG	Salifou Saibou (on loan from Al Ittihad)
26	FW	(Nigeria) NGA	Christian Obinna
27	MF	(Libya) LBY	Mohammad Issa
27	FW	(Libya) LBY	Hamza Zouby
30	DF	(Libya) LBY	Mohammad Abu Buhair
