= Al-Suqoor Club =

Libyan football club

- Full name: Al-Suqoor Club نادي الصقور
- Founded: December 23, 1922
- Ground: Tobruk Stadium; Tobruk, Libya
- Capacity: 8,000
- League: Libyan Premier League
Home colours	Away colours

Al-Suqoor Club is a Libyan professional football club based in Tobruk.

== Honors ==
- Libyan Cup
  - Winners (1): 1989

== Performance in CAF competitions ==
- CAF Cup Winners' Cup
  - First Round : 1990
