= Al Dhahra SC =

Libyan football club

Al Dhahr SC
- Full name: Al Dhahr Sporting Club
- Founded: 1947; 79 years ago
- League: Libyan Second Division

Al-Dhahra Sporting Club (Arabic: نادي الظهرة الرياضي) is a Libyan football club based in Tripoli, Libya. The club is playing the Libyan Second Division for this season.

The club was founded in 1947.

== Achievements ==
- Libyan Premier League: 1

1984/85

== Performance in CAF competitions ==
- African Cup of Champions Clubs: 1 appearance

1986: First Round
