= Aschat SC =

Libyan football club

Aschat S.C.
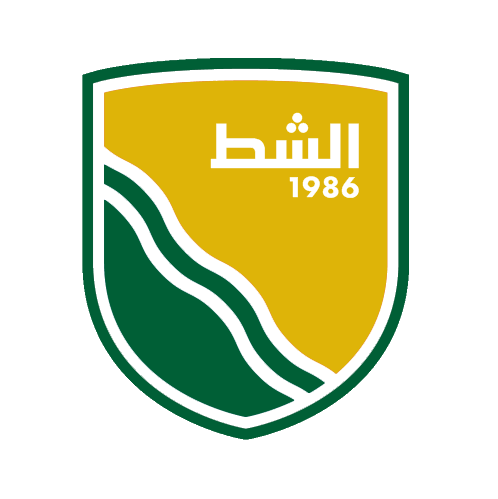
- Full name: Aschat Sports Club
- Founded: 18 January 1986
- Ground: GMR Stadium; Tripoli
- Capacity: 20,000
- Manager: (Tunisia) Lutfi Sellami
- League: Libyan Premier League
- 2009–10: 10th

Aschat Sports Club is a Libyan football club based in Tripoli, Libya. The club was founded in 1986. The club is based in the Zaweyat Addahmani region in Tripoli, near the coast. The club did enjoy success in the 1990s, winning a league title in the 1995–96 season, and winning the domestic cup two seasons later, in 1997–98.

By winning the Libyan Cup, they qualified for the CAF Cup Winners' Cup for the 1999 edition. They went out in the second round, losing 6–0 on aggregate to ASC Mineurs of Guinea. They produced a heroic performance in the first round, defeating WA Tlemcen 2–1 in both legs.

== Honours ==
- Libyan Premier League: 1

1995/96

- Libyan Cup: 1

1997/98

- Libyan SuperCup: 0

Finalist: 1998

- Olympic Winner: 1

1984

== Performance in CAF competitions ==
- CAF Cup Winners' Cup: 1 appearance

1999 – Second Round

== Coaching staff ==
| Position | Name |
|---|---|
| Manager | (Libya) Abdulraouf Bnour |
| Assistant manager | (Libya) Redha Al Turky |
| Coach | (Libya) Mustpaha Zaqlaam |
