= Olympic Azzaweya SC =

Libyan football club

Olympic Azzaweya
- Full name: Olympic Azzaweya Sports Club
- Nickname: القلعة الزرقاء
- Founded: 1947
- Ground: Olympic Stadium; Zawiya, Libya
- Capacity: 8,000
- League: Libyan Premier League
Home colours	Away colours

Olympic Azzaweya Sports Club (Arabic: نادي أولمبي الزاوية الرياضي) is a professional football club based in Zawiya, Libya.

The club most notably competed in the CAF Champions League in 2005, where they went out in the first round to USM Alger, 7–0 on aggregate, having beaten Renaissance FC of Chad 3–2 in the preliminary round.

== Honours ==
- Libyan Premier League: 1

2003–04

== Performance in CAF competitions ==
- CAF Champions League: 1 appearance

2005 – First Round
