= Al Akhdar SC =

Libyan professional football club

- Full name: Al Akhdar Sports Club
- Founded: 1958; 68 years ago
- Ground: Green Document Stadium; Omar Al-Mukhtar Stadium; Bayda
- Capacity: 10,000
- Manager: Sahed Mohdy
- League: Libyan Premier League
- 2021–22: 3rd
Home colours	Away colours

Al-Akhdar Sports Club (Arabic: نادي الأخضر الرياضي, Nādī al-ʾAkhḍar al-Riyāḍī) is a Libyan professional football club based in Bayda.

== Honours ==
- Libyan Cup
  - Runners-up (3): 1976, 2005, 2007
- Libyan SuperCup
  - Runners-up (2): 2005, 2007

== Performance in CAF competitions ==
- CAF Confederation Cup: 3 appearances

2006 – Preliminary round
2008 – First round of 16
2022–23 – TBD

== Current squad ==
As of 5 October 2022 Note: Flags indicate national team as defined under FIFA eligibility rules; some limited exceptions apply. Players may hold more than one non-FIFA nationality.

No.	Pos.	Nation	Player
1	GK	LBY	Jamal Abd Aldaem
2	DF	LBY	Hasan Abbas
4	MF	LBY	Younus Al-Hijazi
5	DF	LBY	Majdi Erteiba
6	MF	SDN	Mohamed Elmonzer
7	FW	LBY	Ahmed Al Gediri
8	MF	TUN	Sanad Khemissi
9	FW	LBY	Abdulsalam Al Fitouri
10	FW	LBY	Faraj Ghidan
11	MF	LBY	Mahdi Al Kout
12	GK	LBY	Mouad Al Mansouri
13	DF	SDN	Mazin Mohamedein

No.	Pos.	Nation	Player
14	FW	LBY	Ibrahim Al Zouari
15	MF	MLI	Namory Sangaré
16	MF	LBY	Mohammed Al Kista
17	MF	LBY	Mutassim Al Taib
19	FW	LBY	Mohammed Jadullah
21	FW	NGA	Sunday Akinbule
22	FW	SEN	Pape Abdou N'diaye
23	GK	LBY	Abdulrahman Al Jaghmani
25	DF	LBY	Ahmed Saleh
26	DF	LBY	Ahmed Huwaydi
27	FW	PLE	Anas Baniouwda
30	DF	ANG	Ary Papel
33	DF	BFA	Trova Boni

== Coaching staff ==
Position	Name
Manager	(Portugal) Rui Gorriz
Assistant manager	(Tunisia) Adel Saasy
Goalkeeping coach	(Libya) Mohammed Bousefi
Team doctor	(Libya) Salah Mehdi
