= Al-Wahda SC (Tripoli) =

Libyan sports club

Al-Wehda SC
- Full name: Al-Wehda Sports Club
- Nickname(s): Awlad Maizran
- Founded: 2 February 1954
- Ground: Ali Alsgozy Stadium; Tripoli, Libya
- Capacity: 3,000
- Manager: (Czech Republic) Otkar Barec
- League: Libyan Premier League
- 2014: 4th
Home colours	Away colours	Third colours

Al-Wehda SC is a Libyan football and basketball club based in Tripoli, Libya.

== Honors ==
- Libyan Cup:

Winners (1): 1993

- Libyan Second Division:

Winners (1): 2006–07

== Performance in CAF competitions ==
- CAF Cup: 1 appearance

1992: Second Round
