= 2008–09 Libyan Cup =

Libyan football competition

The 2008-09 Libyan Cup is the 19th edition of the competition since its inception in 1976.

== Rules ==
45 teams will be entering the competition, composed of 5 sides from the Libyan Third Division, and 40 sides from the Libyan Second Division. 26 were drawn into the First Round, while the other 18 were automatically drawn into the Second Round. The sides participating in the First Round were drawn into regional groups. The Second Round will consist of 32 sides, 18 in the Eastern Section, and 14 in the Western Section. 16 sides from the Second Round will go through to the Round of 32, where they will be joined by the 16 sides in the Libyan Premier League. All ties this season will be one-off ties, compared to previous seasons, where the later rounds were two-legged affairs.

If any of the matches end in a draw, then the tie(s) will be settled by a penalty shootout. This stands until the semi-final stage, where the tie(s) will be settled by two 15-minute halves of extra time, then followed by a penalty shootout if the scores remain level.

== Second round ==
16 sides from the 16 matches being played in this round will go through to the Round of 32, where they will be joined by the 16 Libyan Premier League teams.

Eastern Section

This group will contain 18 sides, 7 of which had qualified from groups A & B in the first round. Over the 9 matches, nine will qualify for the Round of 32.

March 17, 2009
15:00

Al Taw'eah	0 – 5	Shabab al Jabal

10 June Stadium
Referee: Rafa' Zayed

March 17, 2009
15:30

Al Baranes	1 – 1 (5 – 4 pen.)	Shamal Benghazi

Green Document Stadium
Referee: Ibrahim al Fakhiry

March 17, 2009
15:30

Al Anwaar	2 – 1	Al Ansaar

Al Abyaar Stadium
Referee: Ahmed al Jroushi

March 17, 2009
15:30

Al Mukhtar Tobruk	1 – 1 (4 – 3 pen.)	Benghazi al Jadeeda
(1H)		(2H)

2 March Stadium
Referee: Abdallah Fdhail

March 17, 2009
15:30

Darnes	1 – 0	Al Sawaed

Derna Stadium
Referee: Anwar Abdesalam

March 17, 2009
15:30

Al Wahda B.	2 – 0	Al Najma

First Statement Stadium
Referee: Nabeel al Kawaash

March 17, 2009
17:00

Wefaq Ajdabiya	1 – 3	Al Tahaddi
(2H)		(Ghana) Mousa Malik 18' 30'; Osama al Qataani (penalty missed) 40' (2H)

10 June Stadium
Referee: Mohammad al Shelmani

March 18, 2009
15:30

Al Hilal T.	1 – 1 (5 – 4 pen.)	Al Hurriya

2 March Stadium
Referee: Al Taher Fraj

March 18, 2009
15:30

Nojom Ajdabiya	2 – 0	Al Andalus

10 June Stadium
Referee: Mohammad al Jilaly

Western section

This group will contain 14 sides, 6 of which had qualified from Groups C & D in the first round. Over the 7 ties, 7 teams will go through to the Round of 32.

March 17, 2009
15:00

Al Jamarek	1 – 2	Al Mahdeeya

GMR Stadium
March 17, 2009
16:00

Al Hiyad	0 – 1	Abi al Ashar
		89'

9 July Stadium
March 17, 2009
17:00

Al Yarmouk	2 – 1	Rafik Sorman
Ashraf Boukrash (pen.); Ahmad al Danqaawi

GMR Stadium

March 18, 2009
16:00

Nojoom Al Baazah	0 – 2	Al Tala'e

Baazah Stadium
March 18, 2009
17:00

Al Majd	1 – 2	Al Ittihad Gheryan

GMR Stadium

March 19, 2009
19:00

Al Dhahra Tripoli	1 – 1 (4 - 3 pens)	Al Mahalla

GMR Stadium

March 20, 2009
15:00

Al Faaluja	1 – 2	Al Qal'aa
Penalty missed		Abdelrahman al Kaadouaa (1H); Ibrahim al Maghrabi (1H); Nizaar Qaanoon (red card) 2H'

GMR Stadium

== Round of 32 ==
The dates, times, and stadia were announced by the Libyan Football Federation on April 28, 2009.

Division of each club in parentheses

May 1, 2009
16:30

Nasr (LPL)	0–0 (4–5 pens.)	Nojom Ajdabiya (LSD)

Martyrs of February Stadium
Referee: Mohammad al Shelmani

May 2, 2009
16:30

Nojoom Al Baazah (LSD)	1–4	Akhdar (LPL)
		Abdelhameed al Zidane; Khalifa al Meer

9 July Stadium
Referee: Adil al Abani
May 2, 2009
16:30

Wefaq Sabratha (LPL)	1–0	Dhahra (LSD)
Hani al Sharif

Sabratha Stadium
Referee: Fawzi Firaun

May 4, 2009
16:30

Khaleej Sirte (LPL)	2–0	Abi al Ashar (LSD)
Alsheikh Sedao 51' (pen.) 90+3'

2 March Stadium
Referee: Ibrahim al Fakhiry
May 4, 2009
16:30

Hilal Benghazi (LPL)	3–1	Anwaar (LSD)
Mohammad Salem; Fadhil al Ashaiby; Ali al Sharif

Martyrs of February Stadium
Referee: Ahmad al Jroushi
May 4, 2009
17:30

Ittihad Tripoli (LPL)	5–0	Shabaab al Jabal (L3)
Reyad Ellafi 18' 56'; Daouda Kamilou 30'; Lassina Abdoul Karim 37'; Pierre Koulibaly 67'		Naaji Attia (red card)

11 June Stadium
Referee: Abdulrahman al Hraizy

May 5, 2009
16:30

Shat (LPL)	7–0	Hilal Tobruk (LSD)
Kamara Mamadouba; Siraj al Sheikh; Osama Jum'aa; Walid al Sa'udi; Niksan Artouré; Othman Achour (pen.)

GMR Stadium
Referee: Khalid abu Sitta
May 5, 2009
16:00

Darnes (LSD)	0–1	Madina (LPL)
		Mohammad Mgarej 51'

Derna Stadium
Referee: Ahmed al Fitouri
May 5, 2009
16:30

Olomby (LPL)	3–1	Yarmouk (LSD)

Zaawia Stadium
Referee: Wahid Tamuni
May 5, 2009
16:30

Shamaal Benghazi (LSD)	0–4	Tersanah (LPL)

First Statement Stadium
Referee: Altaher Fraj
May 5, 2009
16:30

Qal'aa (LSD)	0–0 (2–4 pens.)	Jazeera (LPL)

2 March Stadium
Referee: Mohammad Abdulrahim
May 5, 2009
16:30

Ahly Benghazi (LPL)	4–2	Tahaddi (LSD)
Younes Baltahaam 21' 66' 90+1'; Ahmad al Masli 30'		Hossam Fathy 33' 38'

Martyrs of February Stadium
Referee: Anwar Abdusalam
May 5, 2009
18:30

Aman al Aam (LPL)	1–1 (2–3 pens.)	Mahdeeya (LSD)

GMR Stadium
Referee: Khalid Adaal

May 6, 2009
16:30

Wahda Tripoli (LPL)	1–1	Wahda Benghazi (LSD)
Penalties
Yousef Mslaty (penalty scored); Abdallah al Sharif (penalty scored); Zakariya bin Mousa (penalty scored); Jasim al Toumi (penalty scored)	4–2 Wahda Tripoli went first	(penalty missed) Sa'ad Muftaah; (penalty scored) Marwaan Ibrahim; (penalty scored) Abdallah Msalam; (penalty missed) Abdulrazzaq al Mahdi

GMR Stadium
Referee: Miloud Khamees

May 6, 2009
18:30

Ittihad Gheryan (LSD)	0–2	Sweahly (LPL)
		Haitham Abu Shah 19' 61'

GMR Stadium
Referee: Hassan al Mounir

May 28, 2009
18:00

Al Mukhtar Tobruk (LSD)	0–2	Ahly Tripoli (LPL)
		Rabee' Ellafi; Husaam al Janafi

Derna Stadium

== Round of 16 ==
Fixtures announced on May 24, 2009
Division of each club in parentheses

May 31, 2009
17:00

Jazeera (LPL)	2–1	Wefaq Sabratha (LPL)
Mansour Al Borki 50' 90+1'

GMR Stadium
May 31, 2009
17:30

Al Mahdeeya (LSD)	2–2 (4–5 pens.)	Al Shat (LPL)

Sabha Stadium
May 31, 2009
19:00

Tersanah (LPL)	0–0 (3–1 pens.)	Olomby (LPL)

GMR Stadium

June 1, 2009
17:00

Akhdar (LPL)	2–0	Ahly Benghazi (LPL)
Abdelhameed al Zidane 1'^{1} Osama Abdesalam 25'		Moataz Ben Amer (penalty missed) 12'

Al Bayda Stadium
June 1, 2009
17:30

Sweahly (LPL)	1–3	Ittihad (LPL)
Adil Diop 53'; Anees al Aziq (yellow card) 56'; Hassan Asmeadah (yellow card) 60'; Lutfi Sellami (yellow card) 71'		Atef Hussein Abu Zaid (yellow card) 45+2'; Pierre Koulibaly (yellow card) 51' (goal) 61' (pen.); Mohamed Zubya 69'; Ahmed Zuway 81'

9 July Stadium
June 1, 2009
17:30

Wahda (LPL)	0–2	Hilal (LPL)
		Naaji al Maqrhi; Fadhil al Ashaibi

GMR Stadium

June 2, 2009
18:00

Madina (LPL)	3–0	Khaleej Sirte (LPL)
Omar Diop 10' 71'; Abdulwahaab Hassan 90+1'

11 June Stadium

June 22, 2009

Ahly Tripoli (LPL)	2–0	Nojom Ajdabiya (LSD)
Mohammad al Maghrabi 38'; Anees Zghab 61'

11 June Stadium

^{1} Zidane's goal was timed at 20 seconds.

== Quarter-finals ==
The draw was made on June 22, 2009 at the LFF headquarters in Tripoli. The ties will be played over three days commencing June 30, 2009.

Tie no	Home team	Score	Away team	Stadium
1	Ahly Tripoli	4–1	Jazeera	11 June Stadium
2	Madina	0–0	Tersanah	11 June Stadium
Tersanah won 5 - 4 on penalties
3	Hilal	2–1	Akhdar	Martyrs of February Stadium
4	Al-Ittihad	7–1	Shat	11 June Stadium

June 29, 2009
17:30

Hilal	2–1	Akhdar
Tariq al Aqrabi 39'; Naaji al Maqrahi 68'		Wisaam Boukteaf 90+5'

Martyrs of February Stadium
June 29, 2009
19:30

Ittihad	7–1	Shat
Ali Rahuma; Mohamed Zubya; Sapol Mani; Mohamed Makhlouf		Rasheed al Deasy

11 June Stadium

June 30, 2009
19:30

Madina	0–0 (4–5 pens.)	Tersanah

11 June Stadium

July 1, 2009
19:30

Ahly Tripoli	4–1	Jazeera
Adnan Belaid; Nader Kara (pen.); Waleed al Sbaee; Husaam al Janafi		Ihaab Bouseffi

11 June Stadium

== Semifinals ==
The draw was made on June 30. The ties will be played over July 5 and July 6.

Tie no	Home team	Score	Away team	Stadium
1	Tersanah	2–2	Hilal	GMR Stadium
Tersanah won 3–1 on penalties
2	Ahly Tripoli	0–0	Al-Ittihad	11 June Stadium
Ittihad won 5–4 on penalties

July 5, 2009
17:00

Tersanah	2–2	Hilal
Samir Al Wahaj 5', 60' (pen.)		Tariq al Aqrabi 27'; Hamid al Tayeb 44'

GMR Stadium

July 6, 2009
17:00

Ahly Tripoli	0–0	Al-Ittihad

11 June Stadium

== Final ==
July 9, 2009
19:30

Al-Ittihad	2–2 (a.e.t.)	Tersanah
Ahmed Zuway 38', 107'	(Report)	Samir Al Wahaj 27', 91'
Penalties
Shaban (penalty scored); Za'abia (penalty missed); Rahuma (penalty scored); Pierre Koulibaly (penalty scored)	3–2 Tersanah went first	(penalty missed) Ambaya; (penalty scored) Jamil; (penalty scored) Qasim; (penalty missed) Falicko; (penalty missed) al Boudy

11 June Stadium
Referee: (Egypt) Essam Abd El Fatah
