= List of football clubs in Libya =

This is a list of football clubs in Libya. For a complete list see Category:Football clubs in Libya

== A ==
- Alakhdhar S.C.
- Al Andalus Tobruk
- Al Ansar Club (Libya)
- Al Dhahra Bani Walid
- Al Harati Khums
- Al Ittihad Gheryan
- Al Sawa'ed
- Al Ta'awon
- Attersana S.C.
- Al Urouba (Ajelat)
- Al-Ahly SC (Benghazi)
- Al-Ahly SC (Tripoli)
- Al-Mustaqbal (football club)
- Alamn Alaam
- Alhiyad Sports Club
- Aljazeera Sports Club
- Annajma S.C.
- Asswehly S.C.
- Al Charara

== D ==
- Darnes Sports Club
- Dhahra

Alitthad, Tripoli 1944

== H ==
- Hilal SC

== I ==
- Ittihad Club

== K ==
- Khaleej Sirte S.C.

== N ==
- Al-Nasr SC (Benghazi)
- Nojom Ajdabiya

== O ==
- Olympic Azzaweya S.C.

== R ==
- Rafik Sorman

== S ==
- Shabaab al Jabal
- Al-Shat S.C.
- Al Soukour

== T ==
- Tahaddy Benghazi

== W ==
- Al-Wahda SC (Tripoli)
