= 2008–09 Libyan Second Division =

Libyan football league season

The 2008–09 edition of the Libyan Second Division began on Tuesday, November 4, 2008. 45 clubs (shown below in their respective groups) attempted to win promotion to the Libyan Premier League for the 2009–10 season.

== System ==
The clubs are sorted by their geographical location in Libya. Groups A & B contain 23 teams that hail from Tripoli, Misrata, Zawiya and Sabha. Groups C & D contain 22 teams that hail from Benghazi, Sirte, Jabal al Akhdar and Al Butnan.

The top two in each group progress to the Final Qualification stage, making 8 teams. These eight teams will be placed in one group, and will play each other, home and away, to determine the two clubs that win promotion to the Libyan Premier League for the 2009-10 season. The club that finishes top of the Final Qualification group claims the Libyan Second Division title for the 2008-09 season. Any bookings, sendings-off or other punishments will be carried forward to the Final Qualification stage.

The two clubs that finish bottom of their respective groups are directly relegated to the Libyan Third Division for the 2009-10 season.

If two or more teams are tied for a particular position, the tie-breaker is as follows:

I) Head-to-Head record between the team(s) in question:

i) Total number of goals scored in meetings between team(s) in question
ii) Total number of away goals scored in meetings between team(s) in question

II) Goal difference
III) Total number of goals scored
IV) Play-off match at neutral venue.

== Promotion and Relegation ==
=== Promoted from 2007–08 Libyan Third Division ===
- Libya Railway
- Wefaq Ajdabiya
- Al Dhahra B.
- Al Ittihad G.
- Al Mahdeeya
- Al Anwaar
- Shamaal Benghazi
- Al Hilal Tobruk
- Al Qairawaan
- Nusoor al Khaleej

=== Relegated to 2008–09 Libyan Third Division ===
- Al Tahaddy Misratah
- Al Ikhaa
- Ghawt al Sha'al
- Al Qurthabia
- Al Manshea
- Al Taraabet
- Al Tayaraan
- Al Buraaq
- Al Shalaal
- Al Mukhtar B.

=== Relegated from 2007–08 Libyan Premier League ===
- Al Suqoor
- Al Urouba
- Nojom Ajdabiya
- Al Tahaddi

== Participating clubs ==
=== Group A ===
Location of teams in Libyan Second Division 2008/2009 - Group A (Tripoli clubs - Al Mahalla, Abi al Ashar & Al Jamarek)

Club	City	Position Last Season
Rafeeq	Sorman	4th, Group A
Urouba	Ajaylat	14th, Libyan Premier League (Relegated)
Al Mahdeeya	Sabha	Promoted from Libyan Third Division (via playoffs)
Mahalla	Tripoli	5th, Group B
Al Dhahra	Bani Walid	Promoted from Libyan Third Division (via playoffs)
Abi al Ashar	Tripoli	10th, Group B
Al Ittihad	Gharyan	Promoted from Libyan Third Division (via playoffs)
Al Jamarek	Tripoli	7th, Group A
Al Yarmouk	'Aziziya	6th, Group A
Al Hiyad	Misrata	7th, Group B
Libya Railway	Zaltan	Promoted from Libyan Third Division (via playoffs)

=== Group B ===
Club	City	Position Last Season
Al Mustaqbal	Jumayl, Zuwara	2nd, Group B
Al Qal'aa	Waddan, Sabha	Promoted from Libyan Third Division (via playoffs)
~~Al Shabab al Wahdawi~~^{1}	Tripoli	Promoted from Libyan Third Division (via playoffs)
Al Charara	Sabha	8th, Group B
Abu Moliyana	Tripoli	3rd, Group A
Al Tala'e	Ajaylat	Promoted from Libyan Third Division (via playoffs)
Al Dhahra	Tripoli	4th, Group B
Al Majd	Tripoli	9th, Group A
Al Shmoo'e	Misrata	5th, Group A
Al Faaluja	'Aziziya	11th, Group A
Nojoom Al Baazah	Baazah, Zliten	6th, Group B

^{1}(Al Shabab al Wahdawi withdrew from the competition at the mid-season break, and therefore had all matches cancelled)

=== Group C ===
Club	City	Position Last Season
Al Mukhtar	Tobruk	12th, Group C
Nusoor al Khaleej	Ajdabiya	Libyan Third Division, promoted
Wefaq	Ajdabiya	Libyan Third Division, Champions
Al Anwaar	Tripoli	Libyan Third Division, Promoted
Wahda	Benghazi	Group C, 10th
New Benghazi	Benghazi	Group C, 8th
Al Ansaar	Benghazi	Libyan Third Division, Promoted
Al Soukour	Tobruk	Libyan Premier League, 15th (Relegated)
Darnes	Derna	Group C, 3rd
Al Morooj	Marj	Group C, 6th
Al Najma	Benghazi	Group C, 4th

=== Group D ===
Club	City	Position Last Season
Al Andalus	Tobruk	Libyan Third Division, Promoted
Al Hilal	Tobruk	Libyan Third Division, Promoted
Al Ta'awon	Ajdabiya	Group C, 11th
North Benghazi	Benghazi	Libyan Third Division, Promoted
Al Hadaf	Benghazi	Libyan Third Division, Promoted
Al Sawa'ed	Benghazi	Group C, 2nd
Al Qairawan	Bayda	Libyan Third Division, Promoted
Nojom Ajdabiya	Ajdabiya	Libyan Premier League, 16th (Relegated)
Al Afriqi	Derna	Group C, 9th
Al Baranes	Benghazi	Group C, 5th
Al Tahaddy	Benghazi	Libyan Premier League, 13th (Relegated via Relegation/Promotion Playoff)

== League tables ==
=== Group A ===
Pos	Team	Pld	W	D	L	GF	GA	GD	Pts	Qualification or relegation
1	Mahalla (C, Q)	22	15	5	2	44	23	+21	50	Qualification for Championship Stage
2	Urouba (Q)	22	15	4	3	47	26	+21	49	Qualification for Championship Stage
3	Rafiq Sorman	22	13	4	5	42	25	+17	43 (Note: HRT 1-2 RFQ; RFQ 2-1 HRT)	
4	Harati	22	13	4	5	40	22	+18	43	
5	Yarmouk	22	11	7	4	36	18	+18	40	
6	Mahdeeya	22	10	5	7	25	23	+2	35	
7	Jamarek	22	6	6	10	33	37	−4	24	
8	Hiyad	22	7	4	11	29	32	−3	23 (Note: Hiyad deducted two points)	
9	Abi al Ashar	22	5	5	12	24	36	−12	20	
10	Ittihad Gheryan	22	3	6	13	23	33	−10	15	
11	Dhahra Bani Waleed (R)	22	2	4	16	11	52	−41	10	Relegation to Libyan Third Division
12	Sikat Hadid (R)	22	4	2	16	18	49	−31	9 (Note: Sikat Hadid deducted five points)	Relegation to Libyan Third Division

Updated to match(es) played on May 25, 2009. Source: kooora.com (in Arabic)
Rules for classification: 1) points; 2) head-to-head points; 3) head-to-head goal difference; 4) head-to-head goals scored; 5) goal difference; 6) number of goals scored.
(C) Champions; (Q) Qualified for the phase indicated; (R) Relegated
Notes:

Home \ Away	ABI	DHAB	HRT	HYD	ITTG	JMR	MHL	MHD	RFQ	SKH	URO	YRM
Abi al Ashar		2–1	1–2	1–0	1–0	1–2	1–2	1–1	1–2	2–0 (Note: Match awarded 2-0 to Abi al Ashar after Sikat al Hadid failed to show for the match.)	2–3	1–1
Dhahra Bani Waleed	2–1		0–2	0–3	0–0	0–5	0–1	0–1	0–0	1–1	0–5	0–2
Harati	3–1	4–1		3–0	2–0	1–0	0–1	3–0	1–2	3–1	1–0	2–1
Hiyad	0–1	2–0	0–2		2–1	5–0	0–1	0–1	4–3	2–4	0–1	1–0
Ittihad Gheryan	0–0	4–0	0–0	2–2		3–3	3–4	0–1	1–2	3–0	2–1	1–3
Jamarek	2–2	4–0	2–2	2–0	1–1		1–1	0–1	1–1	3–1	2–4	1–2
Mahalla	4–2	7–2	2–1	1–1	1–0	3–0		2–1	3–0	1–0	4–1	0–4
Mahdeeya	1–0	1–1	1–2	1–1	1–0	2–1	2–1		1–0	4–1	0–1	0–1
Rafiq Sorman	5–0	1–2	2–1	4–1	2–1	2–1	1–1	3–1		4–1	2–1	1–1
Sikat Hadid	1–1	1–0	1–3	1–3	1–0	0–1	0–2	2–1	0–3		2–3	0–5
Urouba	2–0	4–1	2–2	2–1	3–0	2–1	2–2	1–1	2–1	1–0		3–3
Yarmouk	2–1	1–0	1–1	1–1	3–1	2–0	0–0	2–2	0–1	1–0	0–1	

Updated to match(es) played on 17 May 2009. Source: Libyan Second Division @ goalzz.com
Legend: Blue = home team win; Yellow = draw; Red = away team win.

=== Group B ===
Pos	Team	Pld	W	D	L	GF	GA	GD	Pts	Qualification or relegation
1	Dhahra Tripoli (C, Q)	19	10	7	2	26	11	+15	37	Qualification for Championship Stage
2	Tala'e (Q)	19	9	4	6	30	19	+11	31 (Note: TLA 1-0 MUS; MUS 1-3 TLA)	Qualification for Championship Stage
3	Mustaqbal	19	8	7	4	20	14	+6	31	
4	Shmoo'e	19	6	9	4	22	19	+3	27	
5	Majd	19	6	7	6	22	18	+4	25 (Note: QLA 1-2 MJD; MJD 1-1 QLA)	
6	Qal'aa	19	6	7	6	18	24	−6	25	
7	Nojoom al Baazah	19	7	3	9	24	25	−1	24	
8	Abu Moliyana	19	5	8	6	14	15	−1	23	
9	Charara	19	6	4	9	19	24	−5	22	
10	Faaluja (R)	19	1	8	10	10	34	−24	7 (Note: Faaluja deducted four points)	Relegation to Libyan Third Division
11	Shabab (R)	10	2	4	4	8	10	−2	10 (Note: Shabab al Wahdawi withdrew from the league after Round 10, and therefore did not compete in the second half of the season. Shown is the record after Round 10. Each team will only play 19 games. This is taking into account games played against Shabab al Wahdawi in the first half of the season.)	Relegation to Libyan Third Division

Updated to match(es) played on May 26, 2009. Source: Libyan Second Division at kooora.com
Rules for classification: 1) points; 2) head-to-head points; 3) head-to-head goal difference; 4) head-to-head goals scored; 5) goal difference; 6) number of goals scored.
(C) Champions; (Q) Qualified for the phase indicated; (R) Relegated
Notes:

Home \ Away	ABM	DHAT	FLJ	MJD	MUS	NJMB	QLA	SHB	SHR	SHM	TLA
Abu Moliyana		0–1	0–0	1–1	1–1	1–0	1–1	1–2	0–0	1–0	0–1
Dhahra Tripoli	0–0		2–1	1–2	0–1	4–1	4–0		2–1	1–1	2–1
Faaluja	1–1	1–2		1–1	0–0	0–2 (Note: Faaluja withdrew from match and therefore Nojoom al Baazah were awarded a 2-0 win.)	1–1	0–0	1–0	1–1	0–5
Majd	0–1	0–0	2–0		1–1	3–0	1–1	0–0	3–0	0–1	1–0
Mustaqbal	0–1	0–0	3–1	3–1		2–1	0–0	2–1	1–0	1–1	1–3
Nojoom al Baazah	2–1	0–1	4–0	1–1	1–3		1–1	2–0	2–1	4–1	1–1
Qal'aa	0–2	0–3	1–1	1–2	1–0	2–1			3–0	1–0	3–2
Shabab		1–1					0–1		2–0	1–1	1–2
Sharara	2–1	0–0	4–0	2–1	0–0	2–0	2–0			1–1	3–2
Shmoo'e	3–1	1–1	1–0	3–2	0–1	0–0	1–1		3–0		0–0
Tala'e	0–0	0–1	4–1	1–0	1–0	2–0	1–1		2–1	2–3	

Updated to match(es) played on 26 May 2009. Source: goalzz.com
Legend: Blue = home team win; Yellow = draw; Red = away team win.

=== Group C ===
Pos	Team	Pld	W	D	L	GF	GA	GD	Pts	Qualification or relegation
1	Darnes (C, Q)	20	14	5	1	49	10	+39	47	Qualification for Championship Stage
2	Najma (Q)	20	13	7	0	29	8	+21	46	Qualification for Championship Stage
3	Benghazi al Jadeeda	20	8	7	5	26	23	+3	29 (Note: MRJ 1-3 BNGJ; BNGJ 2-0 MRJ) (Note: Benghazi al Jadeeda deducted two points for financial irregularities)	
4	Murooj	20	8	5	7	30	26	+4	29	
5	Suqoor	20	6	8	6	21	21	0	26	
6	Ansaar	20	5	8	7	18	27	−9	23	
7	Mukhtar Tobruk	20	6	4	10	17	27	−10	22 (Note: WAHB 0-1 MKHT; MKHT 3-0 WAHB)	
8	Wahda Benghazi	20	5	7	8	14	19	−5	22	
9	Anwaar	20	5	5	10	16	28	−12	20	
10	Nusoor al Khaleej (R)	20	4	7	9	19	27	−8	19	Relegation to Libyan Third Division
11	Wefaq Ajdabiya (R)	20	1	7	12	17	40	−23	10	Relegation to Libyan Third Division

Updated to match(es) played on May 25, 2009. Source: kooora.com
Rules for classification: 1) points; 2) head-to-head points; 3) head-to-head goal difference; 4) head-to-head goals scored; 5) goal difference; 6) number of goals scored.
(C) Champions; (Q) Qualified for the phase indicated; (R) Relegated
Notes:

Home \ Away	ANS	ANW	BNGJ	DRN	MKHT	MRJ	NAJ	NUSK	SQR	WAHB	WFQA
Ansaar		1–2	2–1	0–5	2–1	2–2	1–3	1–1	2–0	0–0	2–0
Anwaar	2–0		3–0	0–2	2–0	1–2	1–3	0–1	0–0	0–3	1–1
Benghazi al Jadeeda	2–0	1–1		0–3	2–1	2–0	0–1	1–1	2–1	2–0	3–3
Darnes	0–0	2–0	2–2		3–1	3–0	1–1	3–0	6–0	1–0	3–1
Mukhtar Tobruk	1–1	0–1	2–0	1–5		2–0	0–2	1–0	0–3	3–0	1–0
Murooj	1–0	4–1	1–3	1–1	1–1		0–1	3–2	2–0	1–0	5–1
Najma	0–0	1–1	0–0	1–1	2–0	2–1		4–1	1–0	2–0	3–1
Nusoor al Khaleej	2–3	0–0	1–1	1–2	2–0	1–1	0–1		0–2	1–1	1–1
Suqoor	3–0	3–0	0–0	0–3	0–0	1–1	1–1	1–0		1–1	1–1
Wahda Benghazi	0–0	2–0	0–1	1–0	0–1	2–1	0–0	1–3	0–0		3–2
Wefaq Ajdabiya	1–1	2–0	1–3	0–3	1–1	0–3	0–1	0–1	1–4	0–0	

Updated to match(es) played on 25 May 2009. Source: goalzz.com
Legend: Blue = home team win; Yellow = draw; Red = away team win.

=== Group D ===
Pos	Team	Pld	W	D	L	GF	GA	GD	Pts	Qualification or relegation
1	Tahaddy (C, Q)	20	14	4	2	41	6	+35	46	Qualification for Championship Stage
2	Nojom Ajdabiya (Q)	20	13	3	4	40	10	+30	42	Qualification for Championship Stage
3	Andalus	20	9	6	5	28	19	+9	33	
4	Sawa'ed	20	7	5	8	23	30	−7	26 (Note: BRN 1-2 SWD; SWD 1-0 BRN)	
5	Baranes	20	7	5	8	22	19	+3	26	
6	Shamaal Benghazi	20	6	7	7	15	15	0	25 (Note: TWN 0-1 SHMB; SHMB 2-1 TWN)	
7	Ta'awon	20	7	4	9	28	28	0	25	
8	Afriqi	20	6	6	8	19	22	−3	24	
9	Qairawaan	20	5	5	10	16	45	−29	20	
10	Hadaf (R)	20	6	5	9	22	29	−7	19 (Note: Hadaf deducted four points)	Relegation to Libyan Third Division
11	Hilal Tobruk (R)	20	2	4	14	14	47	−33	7 (Note: Hilal Tobruk deducted three points)	Relegation to Libyan Third Division

Updated to match(es) played on May 24, 2009. Source: kooora.com
Rules for classification: 1) points; 2) head-to-head points; 3) head-to-head goal difference; 4) head-to-head goals scored; 5) goal difference; 6) number of goals scored.
(C) Champions; (Q) Qualified for the phase indicated; (R) Relegated
Notes:

Home \ Away	AFQ	ANL	BRN	HDF	HILT	NJMA	QRW	SWD	SHMB	TWN	THD
Afriqi		2–1	1–1	2–2	2–2	1–0	0–0	1–0	0–0	1–0	0–1
Andalus	1–0		2–0	2–0	4–0	0–2	1–2	0–0	1–2	2–2	2–0
Baranes	0–0	0–2		0–1	4–1	0–0	2–0	1–2	1–0	4–1	0–0
Hadaf	1–2	2–2	0–2		2–0 (Note: Penalty for no show)	0–1	6–0	0–2	0–2	2–0	1–1
Hilal Tobruk	1–3	0–1	0–3	0–0		1–1	1–2	2–3	1–0	2–1	0–2
Nojom Ajdabiya	2–0	1–0	0–0	6–1	5–0		4–0	4–0	2–0	0–1	0–1
Qairawaan	0–1	1–1	2–0	2–1	2–1	0–5		1–1	1–1	1–1	0–5
Sawa'ed	3–2	2–3	1–0	1–2	4–1	2–3	1–0		0–2	0–0	0–3
Shamaal Benghazi	1–0	0–0	2–1	0–0	1–1	0–1	2–0	1–1		0–1	0–0
Ta'awon	2–1	1–3	4–2	1–2	3–0	1–2	7–2	0–0	2–1		0–1
Tahaddy	3–0	1–1	0–1	3–0	5–0	2–1	4–0	4–0	3–0	2–0	

Updated to match(es) played on 26 May 2009. Source: Libyan Second Division @ goalzz.com
Legend: Blue = home team win; Yellow = draw; Red = away team win.

== Championship Stage ==
The top two teams in each group will qualify to this stage of the competition, making 8 teams. These 8 teams will play each other home and away, and the top two sides at the end of these 14 matches will be promoted to the Libyan Premier League for the 2009–10 season. The top team will be crowned champions for this season.

The draw for the Championship Stage will take place on May 27, 2009, at 11:00 EET

=== League table ===
Pos	Team	Pld	W	D	L	GF	GA	GD	Pts	Promotion
1	Najma (C)	14	8	4	2	20	12	+8	28	Promotion to 2009–10 Libyan Premier League
2	Tahaddy (P)	14	7	6	1	15	8	+7	27	Promotion to 2009–10 Libyan Premier League
3	Mahalla	14	7	4	3	20	14	+6	25	
4	Darnes	14	6	5	3	26	16	+10	23	
5	Dhahra Tripoli	14	5	3	6	20	23	−3	18	
6	Urouba	14	4	5	5	20	23	−3	17	
7	Nojom Ajdabiya	14	1	5	8	13	24	−11	8	
8	Tala'e	14	0	4	10	10	24	−14	2 (Note: Tala'e deducted two points)	

Updated to match(es) played on July 31, 2009. Source: kooora.com (in Arabic)
Rules for classification: 1) points; 2) head-to-head points; 3) head-to-head goal difference; 4) head-to-head goals scored; 5) goal difference; 6) number of goals scored.
(C) Champions; (P) Promoted
