= Libyan Cup 2008–09 – first round =

Libyan Cup 2008–09 – First Round. The draw was made by the Libyan Football Federation on February 19, 2009 at 11:00 local time.

All times given as local time (UTC+2)

== Eastern Section ==
There are 20 sides entering, 15 from the Libyan Second Division and 5 from the Libyan Third Division.

=== Group A ===
Butnan and Jabal al Akhdar

Match 1: February 25, 2009, 15:30, Al Bayda Stadium, Referee: Ibrahim al Fakhiry
Shabab al Jabal 4 - 2 Al Qairawan

Match 2: February 26, 2009, 15:30, Derna Stadium, Referee: Mohammad al Zallawi
Al Afriqi 0 - 2 Al Baranes
Ibrahim al Houti, Ahmad al Suaity

Match 3: March 6, 2009, 15:30, Al Bayda Stadium, Referee: Abdallah Fdhail
Al Ansaar 2 - 1 Al Suqoor
Muftah al Suaity (2H), Yousef Khamees 88' ; Mohammed Saad (1H), Alsharif Ahmed (red card) 1H'

- ^{1}Match re-arranged from February 26, 2009 (due to bad weather)

=== Group B ===
Benghazi and Gulf of Sidra

Match 4: February 25, 2009, 14:00, First Statement Stadium, Referee: Mohammad al Jilaly
Al Murooj 1 - 3 Nojom Ajdabiya

Match 5: February 25, 2009, 16:00, First Statement Stadium, Referee: Ahmad al Bouishi
Al Hurriya 1 - 0 Nojom Benghazi

Match 6: February 26, 2009, 14:00, First Statement Stadium, Referee: Nabeel al Koush
Benghazi al Jadeeda 6 - 0 Al Libbah

Match 7: February 26, 2009, 16:00, First Statement Stadium, Referee: Mohammad Shu'aib
Al Hadaf 1 - 3 Wefaq Ajdabiya

== Western Section ==
=== Group C ===
Tripoli and Zawiya

Match 1 - February 26, 2009, 15:30, Zuwara Stadium, Referee: Ashraf al Balsous
Al Mustaqbal 2 - 3 Abi al Ashar

Match 2 - February 26, 2009, 17:00, GMR Stadium, Referee: Abdelrahman al Hraizy
Al Dhahra T 1 - 0 Sikat al Hadeed

Match 3 - February 25, 2009, 16:00, GMR Stadium, Referee: Lutfi Ballu
Abu Moliyana 0 - 1 Al Yarmouk

=== Group D ===
Misrata and Sabha

Match 4 - February 26, 2009, 15:30, Bani Walid Stadium, Referee: Adil al Swaisy
Al Dhahra B. 0 - 5 Al Qal'aa
Basheer al Hillu, Rasheed, Anwar Tahir, Abdesalam Inqaam

Match 5 - February 26, 2009, 16:00, Sabha Stadium, Referee: Khalid al Sayd
Al Mahdeeya 4 - 0 Al Shmoo'e
(Al Shmoo'e (penalty missed) 12'), Abdesalam Kames 17' (pen.) 89', Ali Benbouna 72' 81'

Match 6 - February 26, 2009, 16:00, Baazah Stadium, Referee: Mohammad al Za'alouk
Nojoom Al Baazah 3 - 1 Al Charara
Saheel Douzaan 24', Munder al Haris 29', Atiq Ateeq 44' ; (2H)
