= 2008–09 Libyan Second Division – Championship Stage =

Football mini league

The Championship Stage of the 2008–09 Libyan second division football competition will consist of a mini league of 8 teams, who play each other twice to decide the two clubs who will be promoted to the Libyan Premier League for the 2009–10 season. The top two teams in each group of the regular season will compete in this stage of the competition.

The draw for the Championship Stage took place on May 27, 2009, at 11:00 EET

== Participating teams ==
- Group A
  - Mahalla (champions)
  - Urouba (runners-up)
- Group B
  - Dhahra Tripoli (champions)
  - Al Tala'e (runners-up)
- Group C
  - Darnes (champions)
  - Najma (runners-up)
- Group D
  - Tahaddi (champions)
  - Nojom Ajdabiya (runners-up)

== League table ==
Pos	Team	Pld	W	D	L	GF	GA	GD	Pts	Promotion
1	Najma (C)	14	8	4	2	20	12	+8	28	Promotion to 2009–10 Libyan Premier League
2	Tahaddy (P)	14	7	6	1	15	8	+7	27	Promotion to 2009–10 Libyan Premier League
3	Mahalla	14	7	4	3	20	14	+6	25	
4	Darnes	14	6	5	3	26	16	+10	23	
5	Dhahra Tripoli	14	5	3	6	20	23	−3	18	
6	Urouba	14	4	5	5	20	23	−3	17	
7	Nojom Ajdabiya	14	1	5	8	13	24	−11	8	
8	Tala'e	14	0	4	10	10	24	−14	2 (Note: Tala'e deducted two points)	

Updated to match(es) played on July 31, 2009. Source: kooora.com (in Arabic)
Rules for classification: 1) points; 2) head-to-head points; 3) head-to-head goal difference; 4) head-to-head goals scored; 5) goal difference; 6) number of goals scored.
(C) Champions; (P) Promoted

== Fixtures and results ==
All times local (EET)

Home \ Away	DRN	DHAT	MHL	NAJ	NJMA	THD	TLA	URO
Darnes		4–1	4–0	0–0	3–0	1–0	3–0	1–1
Dhahra Tripoli	3–2		1–3	0–1	2–2	0–1	2–1	2–0
Mahalla	4–1	1–1		0–1	4–2	0–0	2–1	3–1
Najma	3–3	2–1	0–1		2–1	0–1	2–1	4–2
Nojom Ajdabiya	1–1	0–1	0–0	0–2		1–1	2–1	2–3
Tahaddy	1–1	2–1	1–0	1–1	1–0		1–1	2–1
Tala'e	0–1	2–3	1–2	0–1	0–0	1–1		0–0
Urouba	2–1	2–2	0–0	1–1	3–2	0–2	4–1	

Updated to match(es) played on July 31, 2009. Source: kooora.com (in Arabic)
Legend: Blue = home team win; Yellow = draw; Red = away team win.

=== Round 1 ===
Fixtures announced May 27, 2009
All other fixture dates announced on June 1, 2009, times TBC

June 3, 2009
16:30

Dhahra	3 – 2	Darnes
2'; 13'; 45+2'		43'; 48'

GMR Stadium, Tripoli
Referee: Mohammad Rajab
June 3, 2009
17:30

Tala'e	0 – 0	Nojom Ajdabiya

Riqdalin Stadium, Riqdalin
Referee: Adil Arraee
June 3, 2009
17:30

Najma	4 – 2	Urouba
14'; 20'; 28'; 83'		31'; 51'; (red card) 76'; (red card) 90+4'

Martyrs of February Stadium, Benina
Referee: Adil Assuwaisy
June 3, 2009
18:30

Mahalla	0 – 0	Tahaddy
Attiah al Sharif (yellow card) 64' (yellow-red card) 90+2'		Aymen al Aqaily (yellow card) 30' (yellow-red card) 76'

GMR Stadium, Tripoli
Referee: Mohammad Mehraz

=== Round 2 ===
Fixtures announced June 7, 2009

June 7, 2009
17:00

Al Mahalla	2 – 1	Al Tala'e
4'; 8'		90+1'

GMR Stadium, Tripoli
Referee: Abdallah Fadhail
June 7, 2009
17:00

Tahaddy	1 – 1	Najma
Hussam Fathy 11' (red card) 89'		Saleh Kemaal 19'; Mahmoud Ali (red card)

Martyrs of February Stadium, Benina
Referee: Wahid Saleh
June 7, 2009
17:00

Al Urouba	2 – 2	Dhahra Tripoli

Zaawia Stadium, Zawiya
Referee: Ahmed al Fitouri
June 7, 2009
17:00

Darnes	3 – 0	Nojom Ajdabiya
Abdallah al Kilani 59'; Ali Dakheel 73'; Abdulbaset Fraj 78'; Khalifa Belkhatwa (red card) 81'; Ghaith al Dharabet (red card) 88'		Yaseen (red card) 63'

Derna Stadium, Derna
Referee: Mohammad al Zaalouk

=== Round 3 ===
Fixtures announced June 7, 2009

June 13, 2009
17:30

Al Tala'e	0 – 1	Darnes
		Hani al Mazeani 31'

Riqdalin Stadium, Riqdalin
Referee: Jamaal Ombayah
June 13, 2009
17:30

Dhahra Tripoli	0 – 1	Tahaddy
		Aymen al Aqaily 66'

GMR Stadium, Tripoli
Referee: Mohammad al Shelmani
June 13, 2009
17:30

Najma Benghazi	0 – 1	Mahalla

Martyrs of February Stadium, Benina
Referee: Ali al Abani
June 13, 2009
17:30

Nojom Ajdabiya	2 – 3	Urouba

10 June Stadium, Ajdabiya
Referee: Mohammad al Jilali

=== Round 4 ===
June 16, 2009
17:30

Tahaddy Benghazi	1 – 0	Nojom Ajdabiya
Abdesalam Abdelhafidh 42'

Martyrs of February Stadium, Benina
Referee: Ashraf al Belsous

June 17, 2009
17:30

Urouba	2 – 1	Darnes
Ahmed Ajfail 63'; 84'; Mohammad al Shoushaan (red card) 86'		Bashir Boubakr 6'; Abdelbasit Fraj (penalty missed) 45+5'

Ajaylat Stadium, Ajaylat
Referee: Mohammad al Zallawi
June 17, 2009
17:30

Najma Benghazi	2 – 1	Tala'e

Martyrs of February Stadium, Benina
Referee: Mohammad Mehraz
June 17, 2009
17:30

Mahalla	1 – 1	Dhahra Tripoli

GMR Stadium, Tripoli
Referee: Khalid Adaal

=== Round 5 ===
June 21, 2009

Tala'e	0 – 0	Urouba

Riqdalin Stadium, Riqdalin
June 21, 2009

Dhahra Tripoli	0 – 1	Najma Benghazi
		Mohammad Sulaiman 23' (pen.)

GMR Stadium, Tripoli
June 21, 2009

Darnes	1 – 0	Tahaddy Benghazi
Abdusalam al Qatmani 24'

Derna Stadium, Derna

June 29, 2009
17:30

Nojom Ajdabiya	0 – 0	Mahalla

10 June Stadium, Ajdabiya

=== Round 6 ===
June 25, 2009
17:30

Najma Benghazi	2 – 1	Nojom Ajdabiya

Martyrs of February Stadium, Benina
June 25, 2009
17:30

Mahalla	4 – 1	Darnes

GMR Stadium, Tripoli
June 25, 2009
19:30

Dhahra Tripoli	2 – 1	Tala'e

GMR Stadium, Tripoli

June 26, 2009
17:30

Tahaddy Benghazi	2 – 1	Urouba
Aymen al Aqaily 37' 90+5'		Abdelhameed al Seid 4'

Martyrs of February Stadium, Benina

=== Round 7 ===
July 3, 2009
17:30

Tahaddy Benghazi	1 – 1	Tala'e

Martyrs of February Stadium, Benina
July 3, 2009
17:30

Urouba	0 – 0	Mahalla

Sabratha Stadium, Sabratha
July 3, 2009
17:30

Darnes	0 – 0	Najma Benghazi

Derna Stadium, Derna
July 3, 2009
17:30

Nojom Ajdabiya	0 – 1	Dhahra Tripoli

Ajdabiya Stadium, Ajdabiya

=== Round 8 ===
July 7, 2009
16:00

Darnes	4 – 1	Dhahra Tripoli

Derna Stadium, Derna
July 7, 2009
16:00

Nojom Ajdabiya	2 – 1	Tala'e

Ajdabiya Stadium, Ajdabiya
July 7, 2009
16:00

Urouba	1 – 1	Najma

9/9/99 Stadium, Al Ajalyat
July 7, 2009
16:00

Tahaddy	1 – 0	Mahalla

Martyrs of February Stadium, Benina

=== Round 9 ===
July 11, 2009
17:00

Tala'e	1 – 2	Mahalla

Riqdalin Stadium, Riqdalin
July 11, 2009
17:00

Najma	0 – 1	Tahaddy
		Yousef al Sleani 26'

Martyrs of February Stadium, Benina
July 11, 2009
17:00

Dhahra Tripoli	2 – 0	Urouba

GMR Stadium, Tripoli
July 11, 2009
17:00

Nojom Ajdabiya	1 – 1	Darnes

Ajdabiya Stadium, Ajdabiya

=== Round 10 ===
July 15, 2009
17:30

Darnes	3 – 0	Tala'e

Derna Stadium, Derna
July 15, 2009
17:30

Tahaddy	2 – 1	Dhahra Tripoli

Martyrs of February Stadium, Benina
July 15, 2009
17:30

Mahalla	0 – 1	Najma

GMR Stadium, Tripoli
July 15, 2009
17:30

Urouba	3 – 2	Nojom Ajdabiya

Ajaylat Stadium, Ajaylat

=== Round 11 ===
July 18, 2009
17:30

Tala'e	0 – 1	Najma

Riqdalin Stadium, Riqdalin

July 19, 2009
17:30

Nojom Ajdabiya	1 – 1	Tahaddy

Ajdabiya Stadium, Ajdabiya
July 19, 2009
17:30

Darnes	1 – 1	Urouba

Derna Stadium, Derna

July 20, 2009
17:30

Dhahra Tripoli	1 – 3	Mahalla

GMR Stadium, Tripoli

=== Round 12 ===
July 23, 2009
17:30

Urouba	4 – 1	Tala'e

Sabratha Stadium, Sabratha
July 23, 2009
17:30

Tahaddy	1 – 1	Darnes
Abdesalam al Qatmani 9' (o.g.)		Bello Abdellatif 64'

Martyrs of February Stadium, Benina
July 23, 2009
17:30

Mahalla	4 – 2	Nojom Ajdabiya

GMR Stadium, Tripoli

July 24, 2009
17:30

Najma	2 – 1	Dhahra
Eric Obinna 26' 61'		Abdusalam al Abdyadh 41'

Martyrs of February Stadium, Benina

=== Round 13 ===
July 27, 2009
17:30

Urouba	0 – 2	Tahaddy

Sabratha Stadium, Sabratha
July 27, 2009
17:30

Tala'e	2 – 3	Dhahra Tripoli

Riqdalin Stadium, Riqdalin
July 27, 2009
17:30

Nojom Ajdabiya	0 – 2	Najma Benghazi

Ajdabiya Stadium, Ajdabiya
July 27, 2009
17:30

Darnes	4 – 0	Mahalla

Derna Stadium, Derna

=== Round 14 ===
July 31, 2009
17:30

Tala'e	1 – 1	Tahaddy Benghazi

Riqdalin Stadium, Riqdalin
July 31, 2009
17:30

Mahalla	3 – 1	Urouba

GMR Stadium, Tripoli
July 31, 2009
17:30

Najma Benghazi	3 – 3	Darnes

Martyrs of February Stadium, Benina
July 31, 2009
17:30

Dhahra Tripoli	2 – 2	Nojom Ajdabiya

GMR Stadium, Tripoli
