= 2009–10 Libyan Premier League =

Libyan Premier League
- Season: 2009 –10
- Champions: Ittihad; 16th league title
- Relegated: Najma (12th); Tahaddy (13th); Ahly Tripoli (14th)
- Champions League: Ittihad
- Confederation Cup: Nasr (as cup winners)
- Top goalscorer: Rasheed al Deasy (Shat) (15)
- Biggest home win: Ahly Benghazi 5–0 Tersanah (29 December 2009)
- Biggest away win: Tahaddy 0–4 Nasr (18 November 2009); Shat 0–4 Khaleej Sirte (7 April 2010); Ittihad 1–5 Tersanah (26 May 2010)
- Highest scoring: Najma 4–3 Olomby (8 April 2010); Najma 2–5 Ahly Benghazi (27 April 2010)
- Longest winning run: Ahly Benghazi (8 matches)
- Longest unbeaten run: Ittihad (20 matches)
- Longest losing run: Tahaddy (7 matches)

The 2009–10 Libyan Premier League (known as the Libyana Premier League for sponsorship reasons) is the 43rd edition of the competition since its establishment in 1963. A total of 14 clubs contested the league, with Ittihad Tripoli the defending champions.

This has been reduced from the system of 16 teams that had been in place since the 2007–08 season. The season was scheduled to begin on 1 October 2009, but was later postponed until 8 October 2009. The season was scheduled to finish on 14 May 2010. However, this was later delayed to 1 June due to CAF fixtures and national team commitments.

The fixture list was released on 4 September 2009.

The league paused for its mid-season break on 13 January 2010 and continued on 28 January 2010.

There was another break after Round 16 (19 February – 22 March), due to the national team's fixtures, and CAF competition. Next season, the league will be reduced again and this time to 12 teams.

== Summary ==
Ittihad secured their 16th top flight title with three games to spare after a 2–0 home win over Najma on 18 May 2010. This was their sixth league title in succession and their eighth in the last nine seasons.

Ahly Tripoli were expelled from the league and had their record for the second half of the season expunged on 17 May 2010. Having failed to show for two successive matches in protest at unfair treatment spanning a number of years from the Libyan Football Federation, which was sparked by their 1–2 home defeat to bitter rivals Ittihad, they vowed not to compete in competitions run by the LFF. As a result, they were relegated to the Libyan Second Division, meaning each side would now play only 25 games. Tahaddy became the second side to be relegated on 22 May, after Shat, Olomby, Sweahly and Najma all won their respective matches on that day. Due to their inferior head-to-head record, even a victory against Shat on the final day would not have seen them avoid the drop. Their relegation was confirmed after their 3–1 win over Hilal was awarded 2–0 to Hilal after it was discovered Tahaddy had played a suspended player.

In one of the tightest relegation battles in recent history, Sweahly, Olomby, Shat and Najma all started the final round of fixtures within two points of each other, and all facing the danger of the drop. Sweahly hosted Ittihad, Shat were at home to already relegated Tahaddy, Najma travelled to Tersanah, who had secured their safety the previous week, and Olomby faced Nasr at Zaawia Stadium. Olomby went behind early on to Salem al Rewani's spot kick, before equalising on 31 minutes through Aymen Rhifi and Najma took the lead on the half-hour through Chakib Lachkhem's penalty. Sweahly went in front against a much weakened Ittihad side through ex-Ittihad defender Keba Paul Koulibaly's penalty on 43 minutes. At the break, it was Olomby who would be relegated. Shat scored two goals in the first two minutes of the second period against Tahaddy, and added a further two goals for a comfortable 4–0 victory. Najma held on against a lacklustre Tersanah side, meaning they needed Nasr to hold Olomby to face a relegation playoff. Sweahly faced a scare when Saami al Ghoula equalised on 72 minutes, but Tunisian forward Jemail Khemir put them back in front three minutes later, ensuring their survival. With time running out, Rhifi netted on 82 minutes to send the Second Division champions down. Olomby now face a two-legged playoff against Wahda for a place in next season's Premier League.

== Teams ==
As the league reduced in size from 16 to 14 teams, four teams were relegated from last season's competition. These four teams were Aman al Aam, Wefaq Sabratha, Jazeera and Wahda Tripoli. Newly promoted Aman al Aam lasted just one season, though a spirited fightback towards the end of the season meant that their fate was sealed only on the final day, when Hilal got the point they needed to survive. Wefaq Sabratha, another of the newly promoted clubs, were relegated despite a decent start to season. However, a 15-game winless run left them languishing in the relegation zone, and they failed to recover. Jazeera ended their two-year stint in the top flight with a poor showing, losing 20 of their 30 games, and despite a decent run of form towards the back end of the season, it was too little too late. Wahda were rooted to the bottom of the table for the whole season, and did not win a game until a 2–1 away victory at Al Shat in mid-May. Their return of 11 points from 30 games one of the worst in Libyan history.

Only two clubs were promoted from the Libyan Second Division; Najma finished as champions (see Libyan Second Division 2008-09 - Championship Stage), while Tahaddy secured their return to the top flight after a one-year absence.

=== Stadia & Locations ===
Location of teams in 2009–10 Libyan Premier League

Team	Location	Sha'biyah	Stadium	Capacity
Ahly	Benghazi	Benghazi	Martyrs of February Stadium	10,550
Ahly	Tripoli	Tripoli	11 June Stadium	65,000
Akhdar	Bayda	Jabal al Akhdar	Green Document Stadium	10,000
Hilal	Benghazi	Benghazi	Martyrs of February Stadium	10,550
Ittihad	Tripoli	Tripoli	11 June Stadium	65,000
Khaleej Sirte	Sirte	Sirte	2 March Stadium	2,000
Madina	Tripoli	Tripoli	11 June Stadium	65,000
Najma	Benghazi	Benghazi	Martyrs of February Stadium	10,550
Al-Nasr	Benghazi	Benghazi	Martyrs of February Stadium	10,550
Olomby	Zawiya	Zawiya	Zaawia Stadium	6,000
Al-Shat	Tripoli	Tripoli	GMR Stadium	20,000
Sweahly	Misrata	Misrata	9 July Stadium	10,000
Tahaddy	Benghazi	Benghazi	Martyrs of February Stadium	10,550
Tersanah	Tripoli	Tripoli	GMR Stadium	20,000

== League table ==
Pos	Team	Pld	W	D	L	GF	GA	GD	Pts	Qualification or relegation
1	Ittihad (C)	25	15	6	4	45	27	+18	51	2011 CAF Champions League
2	Ahly Benghazi	25	14	4	7	39	27	+12	45 (Note: Ahly Benghazi deducted one point)	
3	Khaleej Sirte	25	13	5	7	47	31	+16	44	
4	Madina	25	8	13	4	31	27	+4	37	
5	Akhdar	25	9	8	8	29	30	−1	35	
6	Nasr	25	10	4	11	38	30	+8	34	2011 CAF Confederation Cup (Note: As cup winners)
7	Hilal	25	9	6	10	29	33	−4	33	
8	Tersanah	25	8	6	11	33	36	−3	30 (Note: TER 2–1 SWE; SWE 2–1 TER)	
9	Sweahly	25	8	6	11	27	37	−10	30	
10	Shat	25	8	5	12	25	36	−11	29 (Note: SHT 1–0 OLY; OLY 1–1 SHT)	
11	Olomby (O)	25	7	8	10	33	36	−3	29	Relegation Playoff
12	Najma (R)	25	8	4	13	23	31	−8	28	Relegation to 2010–11 Libyan Second Division
13	Tahaddy (R)	25	4	5	16	21	49	−28	17	Relegation to 2010–11 Libyan Second Division
14	Ahly Tripoli (R)	13	6	4	3	20	10	+10	22 (Note: Ahly Tripoli deducted three points for failing to turn up for their match with Hilal on 28 April. The LFF then relegated them to the Libyan Second Division on 17 May, after they failed to show for three consecutive matches. Their record for the second half of the season has been expunged.)	Relegation to 2010–11 Libyan Second Division

Updated to match(es) played on 1 June 2010. Source: LFF (in Arabic)
Rules for classification: 1) points; 2) head-to-head points; 3) head-to-head goal difference; 4) head-to-head goals scored; 5) goal difference; 6) number of goals scored.
(C) Champions; (O) Play-off winners; (R) Relegated

=== Positions by round ===
NB: Note: The classification was made after the weekend of each matchday, so postponed matches were only processed at the time they were played to represent the real evolution in standings. These postponed matches are:

- Ahly Benghazi 2–0 Tahaddy (Round 9) (played between 9th and 10th matchdays)
- Sweahly 0–1 Ahly Benghazi (Round 10) (played on 11th matchday)
- Akhdar 1–1 Sweahly (Round 11) (played between 11th and 12th matchdays)
- Ahly Benghazi 5–0 Tersanah (Round 11) (played between 11th and 12th matchdays)
- Tersanah 0–1 Khaleej Sirte (Round 16) (played between 16th and 17th matchdays)
- Ahly Tripoli 2–1 Olomby (Round 16) (played between 16th and 17th matchdays)
- Hilal 2–2 Madina (Round 16) (played between 16th and 17th matchdays)
- Ittihad 3–1 Ahly Benghazi (Round 16) (played between 16th and 17th matchdays)
- Khaleej Sirte 1–1 Ahly Benghazi (Round 20) (played between 20th and 21st matchdays)
- Nasr 3–3 Tahaddy (Round 20) (played between 20th and 21st matchdays)
- Madina 0–1 Najma (played between 20th and 21st matchdays)

Team ╲ Round	1	2	3	4	5	6	7	8	9	10	11	12	13	14	15	16	17	18	19	20	21	22	23	24	25
Ahly Benghazi	8	9	14	13	9	10	11	9	8	6	4	2	2	2	2	3	4	3	4	4	4	3	3	3	2
Ahly Tripoli	11	7	5	4	2	3	5	6	3	2	5	3	3	3	3	2	2	2	2	2	3	5	14	14	14
Akhdar	4	3	4	5	3	2	3	2	4	7	7	7	6	6	7	6	8	8	8	7	8	8	6	4	5
Hilal	13	11	11	9	7	8	6	3	2	4	2	5	7	7	6	7	6	7	7	8	7	7	7	7	7
Ittihad	1	2	2	1	1	1	1	1	1	1	1	1	1	1	1	1	1	1	1	1	1	1	1	1	1
Khaleej Sirte	10	13	8	12	13	11	8	8	7	5	3	4	4	4	4	4	3	4	3	3	2	2	2	2	3
Madina	8	10	10	7	6	6	4	5	5	3	6	6	5	5	5	5	5	6	6	6	6	6	5	6	4
Najma	11	14	13	11	8	9	10	11	12	12	12	12	12	12	12	12	12	13	12	10	10	9	9	12	12
Nasr	1	1	1	2	4	4	2	4	6	8	8	9	9	8	9	8	7	5	5	5	5	4	4	5	6
Olomby	13	11	11	14	14	14	14	14	14	13	13	13	13	13	13	14	14	14	14	14	13	12	12	11	11
Shat	6	6	7	8	12	13	12	12	10	11	11	10	8	9	8	9	9	9	10	12	12	11	11	10	10
Sweahly	4	4	3	3	5	5	7	7	9	10	9	8	10	10	10	10	11	11	9	11	11	13	10	9	9
Tahaddy	3	8	9	10	11	12	13	13	13	14	14	14	14	14	14	13	13	12	13	13	14	14	13	13	13
Tersanah	6	5	6	6	10	7	9	10	11	9	10	11	11	11	11	11	10	10	11	9	9	10	8	8	8

Updated to match(es) played on 2009-06-01. Source: LFF (in Arabic)

== Results ==
- Ahly Tripoli's record for the second half of the season was expunged by the Libyan Football Federation on 17 May, leaving the results from their first 13 games intact.

Home \ Away	AHLB	AHLT	AKH	HIL	ITT	KHA	MAD	NAJ	NSR	OLY	SHT	SWE	THD	TER
Ahly Benghazi		0–0	2–1	2–1	0–2 (Note: Match abandoned after Ahmed Zuway's 75th-minute goal due to crowd trouble with the score at 2–1 to Ittihad, LFF awarded match 2–0 to Ittihad.)	0–2	0–0	2–1	2–1	2–3	1–0	1–1	2–0	5–0
Ahly Tripoli				0–1				3–0			3–0	2–0	3–0	3–2
Akhdar	2–1	2–1		2–0	2–2	2–3	2–2	1–0	1–0	1–0	1–0	1–1	3–1	2–2
Hilal	0–1		1–2		1–1	1–0	2–2	0–1	0–2	2–2	3–2	2–2	2–0 (Note: LFF awarded match 2–0 to Hilal after it was discovered Tahaddy had played a suspended player. Match had originally finished 1–3 to Tahaddy.)	1–2
Ittihad	3–1	2–1	3–0	1–1		2–1	3–3	2–0	3–0	3–2	0–1	3–1	3–0	1–5
Khaleej Sirte	1–1	2–2	1–0	4–0	2–3		2–2	1–0	2–1	3–2	4–1	2–2	2–3	2–0
Madina	0–1	1–1	2–0	0–0	0–0	1–1		0–1	2–2	2–1	1–0	2–0 (Note: Match awarded 2–0 to Madina by LFF after it was discovered Sweahly had played a suspended player (Keba Paul Koulibaly). Match had originally finished 1–1)	1–1	2–1
Najma	2–5		1–1	0–1	0–1	1–0	0–1		1–0	4–3	0–1	3–0	1–2	2–2
Nasr	3–1	0–1	2–0	2–1	3–1	4–1	3–1	0–0		1–1	1–0	1–2	3–3	0–1
Olomby	1–3	0–0	0–0	1–2	0–2	2–1	1–1	1–1	2–1		1–1	2–1	0–1	3–1
Shat	0–2		2–1	1–3	1–2	0–4	1–1	2–1	1–3	1–0		3–3	4–0	1–1
Sweahly	0–1		2–1	1–0	2–1	1–3	0–1	2–1	1–0	0–0	0–1		0–2	2–1
Tahaddy	1–2		1–1	1–2	0–0	0–2	1–3	0–1	0–4	1–3	0–1	1–2		2–2
Tersanah	2–1		0–0	1–2	0–1	0–1	3–0	0–1	2–1	1–2	0–0	2–1	2–0	

Updated to match(es) played on 2010-06-01. Source: LFF (in Arabic)
Legend: Blue = home team win; Yellow = draw; Red = away team win.

== Relegation playoff ==
The second-placed team in the Libyan Second Division Promotion Stage, Wahda, faced a two-legged play-off match against the 11th placed team in the Premier League, Olomby for a place in the Premier League next season. The draw was made on 2 June. The matches took place on 5 and 9 June, with Olomby winning 3–1 on aggregate and retaining their place in the top flight for next season.

5 June 2010

Wahda	0 – 1	Olomby
		Rhifi 31'

GMR Stadium, Tripoli
Referee: Muhammad al Jilali

9 June 2010

Olomby	2 – 1	Wahda
Qarearah 45+1'; Rhifi 76'		Aktouba 44'

Zaawia Stadium, Zawiya

Olomby won 3–1 on aggregate

== Season statistics ==
=== Top Scorers ===
Updated 28 April 2010

Rank	Scorer	Club	Goals
1	(Senegal) Sheikh Sedao	Khaleej Sirte	11
1	(Libya) Ahmed Krawa'a	Tersanah	11
3	(Ivory Coast) Stefan de Paul	Madina	10
3	(Morocco) Rasheed al Deasy	Shat	10
5	(Libya) Ahmed Zuway	Ittihad	9
6	(Libya) Achour Majeed	Khaleej Sirte	8
7	(Nigeria) Ndubuisi Eze	Nasr	7
7	(Libya) Samir al Wahaj	Ahly Benghazi	7
7	(Libya) Mohammad al Maghrabi	Ahly Tripoli	7

=== Overall ===
- Most wins – Ittihad (15)
- Fewest wins – Tahaddy (4)
- Most losses - Tahaddy (16)
- Fewest losses - Ittihad and Madina (4)
- Most goals scored – Khaleej Sirte (47)
- Fewest goals scored – Tahaddy (21)
- Most goals conceded – Tahaddy (49)
- Fewest goals conceded – Ittihad, Ahly Benghazi & Madina (27)
- Best goal difference – Ittihad (+18)
- Worst goal difference – Tahaddy (−28)

=== Home ===
- Most wins − Ittihad (9)
- Fewest wins − Tahaddy (0)
- Most losses − Tahahddy (9)
- Fewest losses − Akhdar (1)
- Most goals scored − Ittihad (29)
- Fewest goals scored − Tahaddy (8)
- Most goals conceded − Tahaddy (23)
- Fewest goals conceded − Madina (9)

=== Away ===
- Most wins − Ahly Benghazi (7)
- Fewest wins − Akhdar (1)
- Most losses − Nasr (8)
- Fewest losses − Ittihad & Madina (2)
- Most goals scored − Ahly Benghazi & Tersanah (20)
- Fewest goals scored − Akhdar (7)
- Most goals conceded − Tersanah (26)
- Fewest goals conceded − Ittihad (11)

=== Clean Sheets ===
- Most clean sheets − Ittihad (10)
- Fewest clean sheets − Tahaddy (3)

=== Scoring ===
- First goal of the season: Mohammad Zirqi for Khaleej Sirte against Tahaddy, 18th minute (8 October 2009)
- Last goal of the season: Aymen Rhifi for Olomby against Nasr, 82nd minute (1 June 2010)
- First penalty kick of the season : Mohammad al Mabrouk (scored) for Tahaddy, 60th minute (8 October 2009)
- First own goal of the season : Ali Salama (Ahly Benghazi) for Nasr, 58 minutes and 37 seconds (29 October 2009)
- Fastest goal in a match: 9 seconds - Ahmed al Mezoughi (o.g.) for Ahly Benghazi against Olomby (27 May 2010)
- Goal scored at latest point in a match: 90+6 minutes and 58 seconds: Sheikh Sedao for Khaleej Sirte against Akhdar (10 December 2009)
- Widest winning margin: 5 goals:
  - Ahly Benghazi 5–0 Tersanah (29 December 2009)
- Most goals in a match: 7 goals:
  - Najma 4–3 Olomby (8 April 2010)
  - Najma 2–5 Ahly Benghazi (27 April 2010)
- Most goals in one half: 5 goals:
  - Najma Benghazi 2–5 Ahly Benghazi (2–3 at half time) (27 April 2010)
- Most goals in one half by a single team: 4 goals:
  - Shat 0–4 Khaleej Sirte (0–0 at half time) (7 April 2010)
- Most goals scored by losing team: 3 goals
  - Najma 4–3 Olomby (8 April 2010)
- Most goals scored in a match by a single player: 2 goals, occurred on 12 occasions
- Shortest time between goals: 1 minute 14 seconds: Omar Dawood (Ahly Tripoli) (31'50"), Mohammad al Tijani (Ahly Tripoli) (33'04") - Khaleej Sirte 2–2 Ahly Tripoli (13 January 2010)

=== Discipline ===
- First red card of the season : Achour Majeed (Khaleej Sirte) against Tahaddy, 59th minute (8 October 2009)
- Most yellow cards in one match : 11 – Ahly Benghazi 2–1 Nasr – 5 for Ahly Benghazi (Akram Ayyad, Adil al Sha'iri, Moataz Ben Amer, Waleed al Dirsi & Ahmed al Masli) and 6 for Nasr (Alaa al Oujli, Abdelhakeem al Mahdi, Marei Al Ramly, Salem al Rewani, Snousi Imbarek & Muaad Aboud) (29 October 2009)

== Continental Competitions ==
=== 2009 North African Cup Winners Cup ===
- Semi-finals

(Morocco) FAR Rabat - Ahly Benghazi W (0–0, 0–1) 1–0 on aggregate

- Final

Ahly Benghazi L - CS Sfaxien (a) (Tunisia) (1–1, 0–0 ) 1–1 on aggregate

=== 2009 North African Cup of Champions ===
- Semi-finals

(Tunisia) ES Tunis - Ittihad Tripoli L (2–1, 2–2) 4–3 on aggregate

=== 2010 CAF Champions League ===
- Preliminary round
  - (Mali) Djoliba AC – Ahly Benghazi L (1–0, 0–0 ), 1–0 on aggregate
  - (Central African Republic) AS Tempête Mocaf – Ittihad (1–2, 0–6) 1–8 on aggregate
- First round
  - Ittihad - (Morocco) Difaa El Jadida (1–1, 1–1 (a.e.t.)2–2 on aggregate, Ittihad won 4–3 on penalties
- Second round
  - Ittihad L - (Egypt) Al Ahly (2–0, 0–3 ) 2–3 on aggregate

=== 2010 CAF Confederation Cup ===
- Preliminary round
  - (Chad) AS CotonTchad – Ahly Tripoli (0–0, 0–2) 0–2 on aggregate
  - Tersanah L – (Algeria) CR Belouizdad (1–1, 1–2) 2–3 on aggregate
- First round
  - Ahly Tripoli L - (Tunisia) CS Sfaxien (0–0, 0–1) 0–1 on aggregate

== See also ==
- 2008–09 Libyan Premier League
- 2008–09 Libyan Second Division (Championship Stage)
