= 2017–18 Libyan Premier League =

Libyan Premier League
- Season: 2017–18
- Dates: 15 August 2017 – 13 Jun 2018
- Champions: Al-Nasr (2nd title)
- Relegated: Annajma; Al Tarsana; Abi al Ashhar; Ascharara; Al-Andalus; Al-Qurdabia
- 2018 CAF Champions League: Al Tahaddy (as CAF competitions play-off winner)^{1}
- 2018 CAF Confederation Cup: Al-Ittihad (as CAF competitions play-off runners-up)^{1}
- 2018–19 CAF Champions League: Al Nasr (as league winners)^{1} Al-Ahly (Benghazi) (as league runners-up)^{1}
- 2018–19 CAF Confederation Cup: Al-Ahli (Tripoli) (as league 3rd placed team)^{1} Al-Ittihad (as 2018 Libyan Cup winners)^{1}
- Matches: 168
- Goals: 462 (2.75 per match)
- Top goalscorer: Ahmed Krawa'a (11 goals)
- Biggest home win: Al-Ahli (Tripoli) 7–1 Rafik (13 October 2017)
- Biggest away win: Qurdabia 0–5 Al Ta'awon (26 October 2017)
- Highest scoring: Al-Ahli (Tripoli) 7–1 Rafik (13 October 2017)
- Longest winning run: 8 matches Al-Tahaddy
- Longest unbeaten run: 9 matches Al-Ittihad; Al-Ahly Tripoli; Al-Madinah
- Longest winless run: 12 matches Al-Qurdabia; Al-Andalus
- Longest losing run: 8 matches Al-Qurdabia
- All statistics correct as of 13 Jun 2018.

The 2017–18 Libyan Premier League was the 47th season of the Libyan Premier League, the top Libyan professional league for association football clubs, since its establishment in 1963. The season started on 15 August 2017 and concluded on 13 June 2018.

^{1} The 2017-18 season was used to determine the teams that will compete in 2018 and 2018-19 CAF competitions.

== Teams ==
Due to the continued security situation in Libya in 2017 and the difficulty in air-travel for most teams, the participating teams were grouped by their geographical location into four groups of seven teams. Teams from each group were scheduled to play every team from their group in a home-and-away round robin format with 3 points given for a win and 1 point for a draw.

Location of teams in 2017–18 Libyan Premier League

	Team	Location
Group 1	Al-Ahly Benghazi	Benghazi
Group 1	Al-Anwar	Al-Abyar
Group 1	Al-Hilal	Benghazi
Group 1	Al Ta'awon	Ajdabiya
Group 1	Annajma	Benghazi
Group 1	Darnes	Derna
Group 1	Qurdabia	Sabha
Group 2	Al-Akhdar	Bayda
Group 2	Al-Andalus	Musaid
Group 2	Al-Nasr	Benghazi
Group 2	Al-Tahaddy	Benghazi
Group 2	Khaleej Sirte	Sirte
Group 2	Nojom Ajdabiya	Ajdabiya
Group 2	Shabaab al Jabal	Shahhat
Group 3	Al-Ittihad	Tripoli
Group 3	Al-Ittihad Misurata	Misurata
Group 3	Al-Tarsana	Tripoli (Souq al Jum'aa)
Group 3	Ascharara	Sabha
Group 3	Aschat	Tripoli
Group 3	Asswehly	Misurata
Group 3	Olympic Azzaweya	Zawiya
Group 4	Abi al Ashhar	Tripoli (Tajura)
Group 4	Al-Ahly Tripoli	Tripoli
Group 4	Al-Khums	Al-Khums
Group 4	Al-Madina	Tripoli
Group 4	Al-Mahalla	Tripoli
Group 4	Al-Wahda	Tripoli
Group 4	Rafik	Sorman

== Stadiums ==
Neutral stadiums were identified within each region to host group games. Matches are to be played without spectators.

Stadium	Location
11 June Stadium	Tripoli
Martyrs of Benina Stadium	Benghazi (Benina)
Misurata Stadium	Misurata
Janzour Academy Stadium	Tripoli
Sabha Stadium	Sabha
Musaid Stadium	Musaid
Al-Khums Stadium	Al-Khums
Sheikh Al-Shouhada Stadium	Al-Bayda
Tarhouna Municipal Stadium	Tarhuna
Zuwarah Stadium	Zuwarah
Zaawia Stadium	Zawiya

== First round ==
=== Group 1 ===
Pos	Team	Pld	W	D	L	GF	GA	GD	Pts	Qualification
1	Al-Ahly Benghazi (Q)	6	5	1	0	15	3	+12	16	Qualification to CAF competitions playoff
2	Al-Hilal	6	4	1	1	9	4	+5	13	
3	Al Ta'awon	6	3	2	1	11	6	+5	11	
4	Al-Anwar	6	2	2	2	6	9	−3	8	
5	Darnes	6	1	2	3	3	4	−1	5	
6	Annajma	6	1	1	4	6	11	−5	4	
7	Al-Qurdabia	6	0	1	5	4	17	−13	1	

Rules for classification: 1) Points; 2) Head-to-head points; 3) Goal difference; 4) Goals scored.
(Q) Qualified for the phase indicated

=== Group 2 ===
Pos	Team	Pld	W	D	L	GF	GA	GD	Pts	Qualification
1	Al Tahaddy (Q)	6	6	0	0	12	3	+9	18	Qualification to CAF competitions playoff
2	Al-Nasr	6	3	2	1	9	5	+4	11	
3	Al Akhdar	6	2	2	2	8	7	+1	8	
4	Shabaab Al-Jabal	6	1	4	1	3	3	0	7	
5	Khaleej Sirte	6	1	3	2	5	7	−2	6	
6	Nojom Ajdabiya	6	1	2	3	4	8	−4	5	
7	Al-Andalus	6	0	1	5	3	11	−8	1	

Rules for classification: 1) Points; 2) Head-to-head points; 3) Goal difference; 4) Goals scored.
(Q) Qualified for the phase indicated

=== Group 3 ===
Pos	Team	Pld	W	D	L	GF	GA	GD	Pts	Qualification
1	Al-Ittihad (Q)	6	6	0	0	16	2	+14	18	Qualification to CAF competitions playoff
2	Asswehly	6	4	1	1	8	3	+5	13	
3	Olympic Azzaweya	6	3	2	1	3	3	0	11	
4	Al-Ittihad Misurata	6	1	3	2	4	5	−1	6	
5	Aschat	6	1	2	3	5	8	−3	5	
6	Al Tarsana	6	1	1	4	4	9	−5	4	
7	Ascharara	6	0	1	5	0	10	−10	1	

Rules for classification: 1) Points; 2) Head-to-head points; 3) Goal difference; 4) Goals scored.
(Q) Qualified for the phase indicated

=== Group 4 ===
Pos	Team	Pld	W	D	L	GF	GA	GD	Pts	Qualification
1	Al-Ahli Tripoli (Q)	6	4	2	0	17	5	+12	14	Qualification to CAF competitions playoff
2	Al-Madina	6	4	1	1	10	5	+5	13	
3	Al-Khums	6	3	1	2	7	5	+2	10	
4	Al-Mahalla	6	2	0	4	4	10	−6	6	
5	Rafik	6	2	0	4	7	16	−9	6	
6	Al-Wahda	6	1	2	3	4	5	−1	5	
7	Abi al Ashhar	6	1	2	3	3	6	−3	5	

Rules for classification: 1) Points; 2) Head-to-head points; 3) Goal difference; 4) Goals scored.
(Q) Qualified for the phase indicated

== CAF competitions playoff ==
The leader of the four groups after the first round at the end of 2017 compete in the CAF competition playoff (also known as quadruple round), which is used to determine the Libyan teams which qualified for the 2018 CAF Champions League and 2018 CAF Confederation Cup.

=== Semifinals ===
November 16

Al-Ahli Tripoli 0-2 Al-Tahaddi

Al-Ahli Benghazi 1-2 Al-Ittihad Tripoli

=== Final ===
Winner qualified for 2018 CAF Champions League. Loser qualified for 2018 CAF Confederation Cup.

November 25

Al-Ittihad Tripoli 1-2 Al-Tahaddi

== Second round ==
The second round of the Libyan Premier League started on 20 January 2018. Results are combined with first round.

=== Group 1 ===
Pos	Team	Pld	W	D	L	GF	GA	GD	Pts	Qualification or relegation
1	Al-Ahly Benghazi (Q)	12	9	3	0	24	6	+18	30	Qualification to Championship playoff
2	Al-Hilal	12	7	3	2	21	12	+9	24	
3	Al Ta'awon	12	6	4	2	20	12	+8	22	
4	Al-Anwar	12	4	3	5	11	18	−7	15	
5	Darnes	12	3	4	5	10	10	0	13	
6	Annajma (Q)	12	3	1	8	14	20	−6	10	Qualification to Relegation playoff
7	Al-Qurdabia (R)	12	0	2	10	8	3	+5	2	Relegation to 2018–19 Libyan First Division

Rules for classification: 1) Points; 2) Head-to-head points; 3) Goal difference; 4) Goals scored.
(Q) Qualified for the phase indicated; (R) Relegated

=== Group 2 ===
Pos	Team	Pld	W	D	L	GF	GA	GD	Pts	Qualification or relegation
1	Al-Nasr (Q)	12	8	2	2	21	10	+11	26	Qualification to Championship playoff
2	Al Tahaddy	12	8	1	3	18	10	+8	25	
3	Al Akhdar	12	5	4	3	14	11	+3	19	
4	Khaleej Sirte	12	4	5	3	14	11	+3	17	
5	Shabaab Al-Jabal	12	3	5	4	11	12	−1	14	
6	Nojom Ajdabiya (Q)	12	2	3	7	8	17	−9	9	Qualification to Relegation playoff
7	Al-Andalus (R)	12	0	4	8	7	22	−15	4	Relegation to 2018–19 Libyan First Division

Rules for classification: 1) Points; 2) Head-to-head points; 3) Goal difference; 4) Goals scored.
(Q) Qualified for the phase indicated; (R) Relegated

=== Group 3 ===
Pos	Team	Pld	W	D	L	GF	GA	GD	Pts	Qualification or relegation
1	Al-Ittihad (Q)	12	11	1	0	33	4	+29	34	Qualification to Championship playoff
2	Asswehly	12	7	3	2	17	9	+8	24	
3	Olympic Azzaweya	12	5	5	2	10	6	+4	20	
4	Al-Ittihad Misurata	12	3	6	3	12	12	0	15	
5	Aschat	12	3	2	7	12	17	−5	11	
6	Al Tarsana (Q)	12	2	2	8	7	21	−14	8	Qualification to Relegation playoff
7	Ascharara (R)	12	1	1	10	4	26	−22	4	Relegation to 2018–19 Libyan First Division

Rules for classification: 1) Points; 2) Head-to-head points; 3) Goal difference; 4) Goals scored.
(Q) Qualified for the phase indicated; (R) Relegated

=== Group 4 ===
Pos	Team	Pld	W	D	L	GF	GA	GD	Pts	Qualification or relegation
1	Al-Ahli Tripoli (Q)	12	7	5	0	24	8	+16	26	Qualification to Championship playoff
2	Al-Madina	12	7	4	1	20	8	+12	25	
3	Al-Wahda	12	4	4	4	10	8	+2	16	
4	Al-Khums	12	4	3	5	9	10	−1	15	
5	Al-Mahalla	12	2	4	6	11	23	−12	10	
6	Rafik (Q)	12	2	4	6	12	24	−12	10	Qualification to Relegation playoff
7	Abi al Ashhar (R)	12	1	6	5	8	13	−5	9	Relegation to 2018–19 Libyan First Division

Rules for classification: 1) Points; 2) Head-to-head points; 3) Goal difference; 4) Goals scored.
(Q) Qualified for the phase indicated; (R) Relegated

== Championship playoff ==
Pos	Team	Pld	W	D	L	GF	GA	GD	Pts	Qualification	ANB	AHB	AAT	AIT
1	Al-Nasr (C)	6	3	2	1	8	6	+2	11	2018–19 CAF Champions League	—	1–0	1–1	2–0
2	Al-Ahly Benghazi	6	2	2	2	7	5	+2	8	2018–19 CAF Champions League	2–0	—	1–1	2–0
3	Al-Ahli Tripoli	6	1	4	1	8	8	0	7	2018–19 CAF Confederation Cup (Note: Al-Ittihad qualified to the Confederation Cup by winning the 2018 Libyan Cup.)	1–2	1–1	—	1–1
4	Al-Ittihad	6	1	2	3	7	11	−4	2 (Note: Al-Ittihad were docked 3 points due to their withdrawal in their last game against Al-Nasr.)	2018–19 CAF Confederation Cup	2–2	2–1	2–3	—

Rules for classification: 1 ) Points; 2 ) Head-to-Head Points; 3 ) Goal Difference 4 ) Goals Scored
(C) Champions

== Relegation playoff ==
Pos	Team	Pld	W	D	L	GF	GA	GD	Pts	Relegation
1	Rafik	6	3	2	1	7	4	+3	11	
2	Nojom Ajdabiya	6	3	1	2	10	10	0	10	
3	Annajma (R)	6	3	0	3	9	8	+1	9	Relegation to 2018–19 Libyan First Division
4	Al Tarsana (R)	6	1	1	4	6	10	−4	4	Relegation to 2018–19 Libyan First Division

Rules for classification: 1 ) Points; 2) Head-to-Head Points; 3) Goal Difference; 4) Goals Scored
(R) Relegated
