= 2010–11 Libyan Premier League =

Libyan Premier League
- Season: 2010–11

The 2010–11 Libyan Premier League (known as the Libyana Premier League for sponsorship reasons) is the 44th edition of the competition since its inception in 1963. A total of 12 clubs will contest the league, with Ittihad the defending champions. The fixtures for the 2010–11 season were drawn on 3 August 2010 on air at 19:30 EET. The season began on 9 August 2010 with the 12 teams agreed upon by the LFF, but, after several rounds of talks, Ahly Tripoli were re-instated following their withdrawal from the league last season, in addition to Tahaddy, Najma and Wahda, the other two sides relegated and last season's Second Division runners-up, respectively.

The season was abandoned half-way due to the Libyan Civil War.

== Teams ==
A total of twelve teams were to contest the league, meaning the league has been reduced in size for the second consecutive season, with eleven teams from the 2009–10 season and one promoted from the 2009–10 Libyan Second Division. However, after the addition of the aforementioned sides, the league returned to a 16-team format.

Ahly Tripoli, Tahaddy and Najma were relegated from the 2009–10 Libyan Premier League after finishing in the bottom three places in the table. Tahaddy and Najma were relegated after just one year each in the top flight, while Ahly Tripoli were relegated by the LFF following a 13-year tenure, after failing to show for two consecutive games, amid protests about unfair treatment.

Darnes secured promotion to the Premier League after a 3–1 victory over Jazeera in the Promotion Stage of the Second Division, returning to the top flight after a twelve-year absence. Olomby were the final side to secure their place for next season, defeating Wahda 3–1 on aggregate in the Relegation Playoff.

Ahly, Najma and Tahaddy were later re-instated, as were Wahda, to make up a 16-team league for this season.

=== Team Summaries ===
Location of teams in 2010–11 Libyan Premier League

Team	Home city	District	Stadium	Stadium capacity
Ahly	Benghazi	Benghazi	Martyrs of February Stadium	10,550
Ahly	Tripoli	Tripoli	11 June Stadium	65,000
Akhdar	Bayda	Jabal al Akhdar	Green Document Stadium	10,000
Darnes Sports Club	Derna	Derna	Derna Stadium	7,000
Hilal	Benghazi	Benghazi	Martyrs of February Stadium	10,550
Ittihad	Tripoli	Tripoli	11 June Stadium	65,000
Khaleej Sirte	Sirte	Sirte	2 March Stadium	2,000
Madina	Tripoli	Tripoli	11 June Stadium	65,000
Nasr	Benghazi	Benghazi	Martyrs of February Stadium	10,550
Najma	Benghazi	Benghazi	Martyrs of February Stadium	10,550
Olomby	Zawiya	Zawiya	Zaawia Stadium	14,000
Al Shat	Tripoli	Tripoli	GMR Stadium	20,000
Sweahly	Misrata	Misrata	9 July Stadium	10,000
Tahaddy	Benghazi	Benghazi	Martyrs of February Stadium	10,550
Tersanah	Tripoli	Tripoli	GMR Stadium	20,000
Wahda	Tripoli	Tripoli	GMR Stadium	20,000

== League table ==
Pos	Team	Pld	W	D	L	GF	GA	GD	Pts
1	Ittihad	15	12	3	0	32	7	+25	39
2	Ahly Tripoli	15	10	3	2	24	11	+13	33
3	Ahly Benghazi	15	9	4	2	19	9	+10	31
4	Akhdar	15	7	3	5	27	18	+9	24
5	Tersanah	15	6	5	4	16	11	+5	23
6	Madina	15	6	4	5	21	14	+7	22
7	Darnes	15	5	6	4	15	16	−1	21
8	Khaleej Sirte	15	6	2	7	24	31	−7	20
9	Nasr	14	5	2	7	16	17	−1	17
10	Hilal	15	3	7	5	9	17	−8	16
11	Olomby	15	2	9	4	16	19	−3	15
12	Wahda	15	3	6	6	16	21	−5	15
13	Tahaddy	15	3	5	7	11	20	−9	14
14	Shat	15	3	3	9	12	27	−15	12
15	Najma	15	2	4	9	10	24	−14	10
16	Sweahly	14	0	8	6	10	16	−6	8

Updated to match(es) played on 4 February 2011. Source: kooora.com (in Arabic)
Rules for classification: 1) points; 2) head-to-head points; 3) head-to-head goal difference; 4) head-to-head goals scored; 5) goal difference; 6) number of goals scored.

== Results ==
Home \ Away	AHLT	AHLB	AKH	DRN	HIL	ITT	KHA	MAD	NAJ	NSR	OLY	SHT	SWE	THD	TER	WAH
Ahly Tripoli		1–0	1–0		1–1		3–1	0–0	2–0		3–3				2–0	
Ahly Benghazi				2–0	1–1	1–1	1–0	2–1		0–0				2–1	2–1	
Akhdar		2–0			1–1		4–1	2–3	4–1	2–1		4–0			2–0	
Darnes	2–4		2–1		1–0				2–1	2–0					0–0	1–1
Hilal	1–1		1–1				2–4			0–3	0–0		1–1	1–0	1–0	
Ittihad	1–0		2–0	3–0	1–0				3–0	2–1					1–1	
Khaleej Sirte				1–3	1–1				2–1	4–1	2–2	3–1	1–0	1–0		
Madina				2–1	4–0	0–1	1–1				4–0			0–1		2–1
Najma		0–1			0–0			2–1			1–0	1–3	1–1		1–1	0–1
Nasr	2–1				1–1			1–2	2–0		2–2	1–0				2–0
Olomby		0–0	3–1	1–1	1–1	0–1						2–2		2–0		0–0
Shat	0–1	0–4		0–0	0–1	0–4		1–0					1–1	2–3		
Sweahly	0–1	1–2	1–2	0–0	1–1	0–1		1–1			0–0					
Tahaddy	0–2		0–0	0–0	1–1	2–2			1–1	1–0			1–1			1–2
Tersanah					1–1		2–0	0–0			2–1	2–0	2–1	4–0		0–0
Wahda	1–2	0–1	2–2		0–0	2–3	4–3					0–2	2–2			

Source: kooora.com (in Arabic)
Legend: Blue = home team win; Yellow = draw; Red = away team win.

== Season statistics ==
=== Scoring ===
- First goal of the season: (Libya) Abdelhameed al Zaidani (Akhdar) against Madina – 2 minutes and 8 seconds (9 August 2010)
- Fastest goal in a match: 1 minutes 48 seconds – (Libya) Fraj Abdelhafeedh for Ahly Benghazi against Shat (10 August 2010)
- Goal scored at latest point in a match: 97 minutes 32 seconds – (Libya) Idrees al Qat'aani for Ahly Benghazi against Shat (10 August 2010)
- Widest winning margin: 4 goals
  - Shat 0–4 Ahly Benghazi (10 August 2010)
- Most goals in a match by one team: 4 goals – Shat 0–4 Ahly Benghazi (10 August 2010)
- Most goals in one half: 4 goals – Akhdar 2–3 Madina (1–0 at half time) (9 August 2010)
- Most goals in one half by a single team: 3 goals
  - Akhdar 2–3 Madina (1–0 at half time) (9 August 2010)
  - Shat 0–4 Ahly Benghazi (0–1 at half time) (10 August 2010)
- Most goals in one match by a single player: 2 goals
  - (Senegal) Camara Sanosar for Madina against Akhdar (9 August 2010)
  - (Togo) Sapol Mani for Ittihad against Darnes (9 August 2010)
  - (Libya) Fraj Abdelhafeedh for Ahly Benghazi against Shat (10 August 2010)
