= 2009–10 Libyan Second Division – Group A =

== Clubs ==
Club	City	Position Last Season
Jazeera	Zuwara	Premier League, 15th (Relegated)
Mustaqbal	Jumayl	3rd, Group B
Urouba	Ajaylat	2nd, Group A
Tala'e	Riqdaleen	2nd, Group B
Wefaq	Sabratha	Premier League, 14th (Relegated)
Rafik Sorman	Sorman	3rd, Group A
Yarmouk	'Aziziya	5th, Group A
Ittihad	Gharyan	10th, Group A
Shati'	Sabratha	Third Division (Promoted)

== Results ==
Home \ Away	ITTG	JAZ	MUS	RFQ	SHI	TLA	URO	WFQ	YRM
Ittihad Gheryan		0–0	0–0	1–2	0–0	0–1	0–2	0–0	1–6
Jazeera	2–0		1–0	0–5	1–0	1–0	2–2	2–1	1–0
Mustaqbal	0–0	0–0		1–1	0–1	0–2 (Note: Match awarded 2–0 to Tala'e after Mustaqbal played an ineligible player. Match originally finished 1–0 to Mustaqbal.)	1–0	0–1	1–1
Rafiq Sorman	1–0	0–0	0–2		1–1	2–1	0–0	3–2	1–2
Shati	3–1	0–2	2–1	0–2		1–0	0–1	1–1	0–0
Tala'e	2–1	0–0	0–1	0–1	2–0		2–1	0–1	1–0
Urouba	3–1	1–1	2–2	0–0	0–1	2–0		2–1	0–0
Wefaq Sabratha	4–1	0–1	0–1	1–2	2–0	3–2	0–0		0–1
Yarmouk	0–0	1–2	1–0	0–1	3–0	1–1	0–0	0–0	

Updated to match(es) played on 2010-03-18. Source: kooora.com (in Arabic)
Legend: Blue = home team win; Yellow = draw; Red = away team win.

== League table ==
Pos	Team	Pld	W	D	L	GF	GA	GD	Pts	Qualification or relegation
1	Jazeera (A)	16	9	6	1	16	10	+6	33	Qualification for Promotion Stage
2	Rafiq Sorman	16	9	5	2	22	10	+12	32	
3	Urouba	16	5	8	3	18	11	+7	23	
4	Yarmouk	16	5	7	4	16	10	+6	22	
5	Tala'e	16	6	2	8	14	15	−1	20	
6	Wefaq Sabratha	16	5	4	7	17	16	+1	19	
7	Shati	16	5	4	7	11	17	−6	19	
8	Mustaqbal	16	4	6	6	9	12	−3	18	
9	Ittihad Gheryan (R)	16	0	6	10	6	28	−22	6	Relegation to Libyan Third Division

Updated to match(es) played on 2009-03-08. Source: kooora.com (in Arabic)
Rules for classification: 1) points; 2) head-to-head points; 3) head-to-head goal difference; 4) head-to-head goals scored; 5) goal difference; 6) number of goals scored.
(A) Advance to a further round; (R) Relegated

== Top scorers ==
Pos	Player	Club	Goals
1	Adnan al Trabelsi	Wefaq Sabrathha	6
1	Wasim al Fazzani	Mustaqbal	6
3	Faraj Salem	Yarmouk	5
3	Waleed Ahmed	Rafik Sorman	5
3	Rajab Abu Karash	Yarmouk	5
3	Mohammad al Hammasi	Jazeera	5
