= 2007–08 Libyan Premier League =

Libyan Premier League
- Season: 2007–08
- Champions: Al Ittihad; 14th Libyan Premier League title
- Relegated: Al Tahaddy; Al Urouba; Nojom Ajdabiya
- CAF Champions League 2009: Al Ittihad; Al Ahly Tripoli
- CAF Confederation Cup 2009: Khaleej Sirte (via Libyan Cup); Al Ahly Benghazi
- Top goalscorer: (Libya) Abdelhameed Zidane (21)
- Biggest home win: Al Ahly Tripoli 10-2 Al Suqoor (2007-12-07)
- Biggest away win: Al Wahda 1–5 Al Ittihad (2007-10-11); Al Suqoor 0-4 Al Ittihad (2008-07-19)
- Highest scoring: Al Ahly Tripoli 10-2 Al Suqoor (2007-12-07)

Libyan Premier League 2007/2008 was the 41st edition of the Libyan Premier League, the highest division of Libyan football, organised by the Libyan Football Federation.

== Season summary ==
In a more closely contested league contest than in recent seasons, Al Ittihad took until week 28 to secure their 14th league title. Al Ahly Tripoli challenged their close rivals all the way in the title race, but just four points from their last three games, including a humiliating 1-0 defeat to eventually relegated Al Tahaddy, ended their title hopes and their 29-game unbeaten record, which had lasted all year. Al Ittihad also went through the league season unbeaten. After just one defeat in the 2006-07 season, this shows signs that the Big Two are pulling even further away, proved by the 20-point gap between 2nd placed Al Ahly Tripoli and 3rd placed Al Ahly Benghazi.

2007-08 was a very successful season for Khaleej Sirte. The club won two trophies (its first major honours since the three Sirte clubs merged to form Khaleej Sirte). The club won the Libyan Confederation Cup, a newly created trophy similar to England's League Cup, before later lifting the Libyan Cup, beating Al Madina in a tense final 1-0.

At the bottom, Al Suqoor and Nojom Ajdabiya both had very poor seasons, with just 9 wins between the two sides. Al Suqoor suffered one of the worst defeats in Libyan history, as they were crushed 10-2 by A Ahli Tripoli. Al Urouba did put up a decent fight, winning 4 of their last 7 matches, nearly half of the number of wins they had obtained in their previous 23 matches. In the end, they paid the price for losing to relegation rivals.

The Relegation/Promotion play-off place was an interesting battle. Three teams were on 33 points, and it was head-to-head record that sent Al Tahaddy to their eventual relegation.

In general, the league was pretty close, with just 10 points separating 5th placed Khaleej Sirte from 14th placed (and relegated) Al Urouba.

== The competition ==
There are 16 clubs in the League. During the course of the season each clubs plays others two times, for a total of 30 games. At the end of season, the bottom three sides are automatically relegated to the Libyan Second Division, and the fourth bottom side goes into the Relegation play-off.

The winner of the LPL qualifies for the CAF Champions League, and the top two sides qualify for the Arab Champions League, while the Libyan Cup winner qualifies for the CAF Confederation Cup

== Clubs ==
Club	City	Stadium
Ahly Benghazi	Benghazi	28 March Stadium
Ahly Tripoli	Tripoli	11 June Stadium
Akhdar	Bayda	Green Document Stadium
Jazeera	Zuwara	Zuwara Stadium
Nojom Ajdabiya	Ajdabiya	10 March Stadium
Ittihad	Tripoli	11 June Stadium
Madina	Tripoli	11 June Stadium
Nasr	Benghazi	28 March Stadium
Olomby	Zawiya	Zaawia Stadium
Al Shat	Tripoli	Ali Alsgozy Stadium
Suqoor	Tobruk	2 March Stadium
Tahaddy	Benghazi	28 March Stadium
Khaleej Sirte	Sirte	2 March Stadium
Wahda	Tripoli	GMR Stadium
Urouba	Ajaylat	Ajaylat Stadium
Tersanah	Tripoli	GMR Stadium

== Statistics ==
- First Match: Al Ahly Tripoli vs. Nojom Ajdabiya - September 20, 2007
- First Referee: Naaji al Khabaat - Al Ahly Tripoli vs. Nojom Ajdabiya - September 20, 2007
- First Goal Scored: Ali Hussein Rehema for Al Ahly Tripoli against Nojom Ajdabiya - September 20, 2007
- Last Goal Scored: Reyad Ellafi for Al Ittihad against Nojom Ajdabiya - July 22, 2008
- First Sending Off: Aqila Bousedrah for Nojom Ajdabiya against Al Ahly Tripoli - September 20, 2007
- Total Number of Goals Scored: 618 (480 matches played - average 1.2875 goals per game)
- Most Goals Scored by One Team: 77 goals - Al Ahly Tripoli
- Fewest Goals Conceded by One Team: 16 goals - Al Ittihad
- Most Goals Conceded by One Team: 69 goals - Al Suqoor
- Biggest Scoreline: Al Ahly Tripoli 10 - 2 Al Suqoor - December 12, 2007
- Most Wins: 26 - Al Ittihad
- Most Draws: 13 - Al Madina
- Most Defeats: 23 - Nojom Ajdabiya

== League table ==
Pos	Team	Pld	W	D	L	GF	GA	GD	Pts	Qualification or relegation
1	Ittihad (C)	30	26	4	0	68	16	+52	82	2009 CAF Champions League
2	Ahly Tripoli	30	23	6	1	77	28	+49	75	2009 CAF Champions League
3	Ahly Benghazi	30	15	10	5	44	20	+24	55	CAF Confederation Cup 2009 (Note: Khaleej Sirte qualify for CAF Confederation Cup as Libyan Cup winners)
4	Akhdar	30	15	8	7	48	33	+15	50 (Note: Al Akhdar deducted 3 points for cancelling their match with Al Ittihad)	
5	Khaleej Sirte	30	11	8	11	34	35	−1	41 (Note: NSR 0–1 KHA; KHA 1–1 NSR)	CAF Confederation Cup 2009
6	Nasr	30	11	9	10	39	29	+10	41 (Note: Al Nasr deducted 1 point for failing to show up for their match against Al Shat)	
7	Madina	30	9	13	8	29	28	+1	40	
8	Olomby	30	9	12	9	36	34	+2	39	
9	Shat	30	11	3	16	34	47	−13	36	
10	Jazeera	30	9	8	13	27	37	−10	35	
11	Tersanah	30	8	9	13	32	40	−8	33 (Note: TER: 10 pts 5–2; WAH: 3 pts 3–4; THD: 2 pts 5–7)	
12	Wahda	30	9	6	15	38	48	−10	33	
13	Tahaddy (R)	30	8	9	13	37	42	−5	33	Qualification for Promotion/relegation playoffs
14	Urouba (R)	30	9	4	17	29	47	−18	31	Relegation to Libyan Second Division
15	Suqoor (R)	30	6	3	21	23	69	−46	20 (Note: Al Suqoor deducted one point for abandoning their match with Al Ahly Tripoli)	Relegation to Libyan Second Division
16	Nojom Ajdabiya (R)	30	3	4	23	25	67	−42	13	Relegation to Libyan Second Division

Updated to match(es) played on July 22, 2008. Source: Libyan Premier League at kooora.com
Rules for classification: 1) points; 2) head-to-head points; 3) head-to-head goal difference; 4) head-to-head goals scored; 5) goal difference; 6) number of goals scored.
(C) Champions; (R) Relegated

== Results ==
Home \ Away	AHLB	AHLT	AKH	ITT	JAZ	KHA	MAD	NSR	NJMA	OLY	SHT	SQR	THD	TER	URO	WAH
Ahly Benghazi		1–1	2–0	0–1	1–1	5–0	0–0	0–0	2–2	1–0	3–0	3–0	3–1	2–1	4–0	2–1
Ahly Tripoli	3–1		4–1	2–2	3–0	2–0	2–1	1–0	1–0	2–1	4–0	10–2	3–0	5–2	3–1	5–1
Akhdar	0–1	2–2		0–2	1–0	2–0	1–0	0–0	2–1	2–2	3–0	3–0	1–1	2–0	1–0	3–0
Ittihad	2–1	1–1	5–2		2–1	5–1	1–1	1–0	6–0	1–0	2–1	3–1	1–0	1–0	3–0	1–0
Jazeera	0–2	0–1	1–0	0–3		2–1	1–1	2–1	1–0	1–2	3–1	2–0	1–0	0–0	0–1	1–1
Khaleej Sirte	0–0	0–1	1–4	0–1	4–1		1–1	1–1	2–0	1–1	0–1	4–0	0–1	4–2	3–1	2–2
Madina	1–1	2–2	1–1	0–1	0–0	1–0		0–2	1–0	0–1	2–0	2–0	1–1	1–0	2–2	2–1
Nasr	0–0	1–1	1–3	1–2	1–1	0–1	3–1		4–1	1–1	2–1	5–1	2–0	2–0	3–1	1–2
Nojom Ajdabiya	0–1	0–2	1–4	1–3	1–2	0–1	1–1	1–2		1–3	2–1	1–2	2–4	2–3	0–0	2–0
Olomby	2–1	2–3	1–1	0–0	1–1	0–2	0–0	0–0	5–0		0–1	1–0	3–2	1–1	0–3	1–2
Shat	0–2	1–2	3–3	0–1	2–1	0–0	1–0	2–0	3–0	2–1		3–2	2–3	3–5	1–0	1–3
Suqoor	0–1	0–3	0–0	0–4	1–3	0–0	0–1	0–1	1–2	2–2	1–0		1–0	2–1	2–0	2–1
Tahaddy	2–2	1–0	2–1	1–2	2–0	0–0	0–0	1–3	5–1	1–1	0–1	3–1		0–1	0–0	3–3
Tersanah	0–0	3–4	0–1	0–2	1–1	0–1	2–1	0–0	0–0	1–1	1–1	2–0	3–2		0–1	1–0
Urouba	0–1	1–2	2–3	1–4	1–0	1–2	0–1	2–1	2–1	1–2	0–2	2–1	3–1	0–2		2–1
Wahda	2–1	1–2	0–1	1–5	2–0	0–2	1–2	2–1	3–2	0–1	1–0	6–1	0–0	0–0	1–1	

Updated to match(es) played on 28 July 2008. Source: Libyan Premier League @ goalzz.com
Legend: Blue = home team win; Yellow = draw; Red = away team win.

== Top goalscorers ==
21 goals

- (Libya) Abdelhameed Zidane (Akhdar)

18 goals

- (Brazil) William de Souza (Al Tahaddy)

16 goals

- (Libya) Ahmed Saad (Ahly Tripoli)

13 goals

- (Libya) Abdelmajid Eddine (Olomby)

12 goals

- (Burkina Faso) Pierre Koulibaly (Ittihad)
- (Libya) Osama al Fazzani (Ahly Tripoli)
- (Libya) Mohamed Zubya (Ittihad)

11 goals

- (Iraq) Mahdi Karim (Ahly Tripoli)

== Awards ==
- Best Foreign Player (sponsored by Libyana & Al Madar) - (Iraq) Mahdi Karim (Al Ahly Tripoli)
- Golden Boot - (Libya) Abdelhameed Zidane (Al Akhdar) - 21 goals
- Goal of the Season - (Iraq) Mahdi Karim for Al Ahly Tripoli vs. Al Madina - January 4, 2008
- Young Player of the Year - (Togo) Sapol Mani of Al Ittihad
