= 2009–10 Libyan Second Division – Group E =

This article details Group E for the 2009–10 Libyan Second Division

== Clubs ==
Club	City	Position Last Season
Suqoor	Tobruk	5th, Group C
Afriqi	Derna	8th, Group D
Darnes	Derna	1st, Group C
Mukhtar Tobruk	Tobruk	7th, Group C
Baranes	Al Qubah	5th, Group D
Qairawaan	Bayda	9th, Group D
Ansaar	Bayda	6th, Group C
Andalus Tobruk	Tobruk	3rd, Group D
Shabaab al Jabal	Marj	Third Division (Promoted)
Nusoor Martoubah	Martoubah	Third Division (Promoted)

== Results ==
Home \ Away	AFQ	ANL	ANS	BRN	DRN	MKHT	NSRM	QRW	SHBJ	SQR
Afriqi		4–1	1–1	4–1 (Note: Remaining time of match played on March 21 after original match had been abandoned at 1-1 due to crowd trouble.)	0–1	2–0	1–0	1–0	1–0	3–2
Andalus	4–2		5–1	1–0	1–2	1–1	2–0	1–0	0–1	1–2
Ansaar	0–1	2–2		1–1	0–1	3–1	4–3	0–1	1–2	0–2
Baranes	1–0	1–0	3–0		0–0	0–0	1–0	3–1	1–0	4–1
Darnes	1–1	3–1	0–0	0–0		0–0	4–1	1–1	6–1	4–2
Mukhtar Tobruk	0–0	2–2	1–1	1–1	1–5		2–0 (Note: Awarded 2-0 to Mukhtar after Nusoor had played a suspended player. Match had originally finished 1-0 to Mukhtar.)	1–0	0–3	1–1
Nusoor Murtoubah	0–0	3–1	1–1	1–3	0–3	2–1		2–0	3–1	1–1
Qairawaan	2–3	1–0	3–1	0–1	1–3	2–1	1–0		0–0	0–3
Shabaab al Jabal	1–3	0–2	2–1	2–4	1–2	0–2	4–1	0–1		3–2
Suqoor	1–1	2–1	1–0	1–1	0–1	3–1	1–0	2–0	4–0	

Updated to match(es) played on 2010-03-08. Source: kooora.com (in Arabic)
Legend: Blue = home team win; Yellow = draw; Red = away team win.

== League table ==
Pos	Team	Pld	W	D	L	GF	GA	GD	Pts	Qualification or relegation
1	Darnes (A)	18	12	6	0	37	11	+26	42	Qualification for Promotion Stage
2	Baranes	18	10	6	2	26	13	+13	35 (Note: One point deducted from Afriqi and Baranes after their match on February 17 was abandoned in first half due to crowd trouble with scores at 1-1. Remaining time played on March 21, match finished 4-1 to Afriqi.)	
3	Afriqi	18	10	5	3	28	16	+12	34	
4	Suqoor	18	9	4	5	31	22	+9	31	
5	Andalus	18	6	3	9	26	27	−1	21	
6	Qairawaan	18	6	2	10	14	23	−9	20	
7	Shabaab al Jabal	18	6	1	11	21	34	−13	19	
8	Mukhtar Tobruk	18	3	8	7	16	26	−10	17	
9	Nusoor Murtoubah	18	4	3	11	18	31	−13	13 (Note: Two points deducted by LFF)	
10	Ansaar (R)	18	2	6	10	17	31	−14	12	Relegation to Libyan Third Division

Updated to match(es) played on 2009-12-27. Source: kooora.com (in Arabic)
Rules for classification: 1) points; 2) head-to-head points; 3) head-to-head goal difference; 4) head-to-head goals scored; 5) goal difference; 6) number of goals scored.
(A) Advance to a further round; (R) Relegated
