= 2009–10 Libyan Second Division – Group D =

== Clubs ==
Club	City	Position Last Season
Benghazi al Jadeeda	Benghazi	3rd, Group B
Al Wahda Benghazi	Benghazi	Third Division, (Promoted)
Shamaal Benghazi	Benghazi	6th, Group D
Al Sawa'ed	Benghazi	4th, Group D
Al Anwaar	Aybar	9th, Group C
Nojom Ajdabiya	Ajdabiya	2nd, Group D
Al Ta'awon	Ajdabiya	7th, Group D
Buraaq	Brak	Third Division (Promoted)
Al-Moroug Al Marj	Marj	4th, Group C
Al Hurriya	Benghazi	Third Division (Promoted)

== Results ==
Home \ Away	ANW	BNGJ	BRQ	HRR	MRJ	NJMA	SWD	SHMB	TWN	WAHB
Anwaar		0–0	4–1	3–1	0–1	0–1	2–1	3–0	1–2	1–0
Benghazi al Jadeeda	1–2		2–0	1–0	8–1	1–0	1–1	1–0	1–0	2–0
Buraaq	0–3	1–2		0–1	3–1	0–3	0–2 (Note: Awarded 2-0 to Sawa'ed by LFF after Buraaq played a suspended player. Match had originally finished 1-1.)	1–1	3–2	0–2
Hurriya	0–2	3–4	1–0		2–2	1–4	0–4	0–3	0–4	1–1
Murooj	0–1	1–0	2–0	3–1		1–2	1–2	0–1	2–2	1–3
Nojom Ajdabiya	1–1	2–2	1–1	4–0	0–1		1–1	1–2	2–0	2–2
Sawa'ed	0–0	0–0	2–0	1–0	2–1	1–2		0–1	1–1	2–3
Shamaal Benghazi	0–0	0–2 (Note: Awarded 2-0 to Benghazi Jadeeda by LFF after Shamaal Benghazi played a suspended player. Match had originally finished 2-2.)	1–1	1–1	3–0	2–2	1–1		1–2	0–2 (Note: Awarded 2-0 to Wahda Benghazi by LFF after Shamaal Benghazi played a suspended player. Match had originally finished 1-0 to Wahda Benghazi.)
Ta'awon	0–1	0–1	3–1	2–2	0–0	3–3	1–2	1–1		1–1
Wahda Benghazi	1–2	0–1	3–0	2–1	0–0	3–2	2–2	0–1	2–2	

Updated to match(es) played on 2010-03-10. Source: kooora.com (in Arabic)
Legend: Blue = home team win; Yellow = draw; Red = away team win.

== League table ==
Pos	Team	Pld	W	D	L	GF	GA	GD	Pts	Qualification or relegation
1	Benghazi al Jadeeda (A)	18	12	4	2	30	11	+19	40	Qualification for Promotion Stage
2	Anwaar	18	11	4	3	26	10	+16	37	
3	Sawa'ed	18	8	6	4	25	16	+9	30	
4	Nojom Ajdabiya	18	7	7	4	33	22	+11	28	
5	Wahda Benghazi	18	7	6	5	27	20	+7	27	
6	Shamaal Benghazi	18	6	7	5	19	19	0	25	
7	Ta'awon	18	4	7	7	25	25	0	19	
8	Murooj	18	5	4	9	18	30	−12	19	
9	Hurriya	18	2	4	12	15	41	−26	10	
10	Buraaq (R)	18	2	3	13	12	36	−24	9	Relegation to Libyan Third Division

Updated to match(es) played on 2010-03-10. Source: kooora.com (in Arabic)
Rules for classification: 1) points; 2) head-to-head points; 3) head-to-head goal difference; 4) head-to-head goals scored; 5) goal difference; 6) number of goals scored.
(A) Advance to a further round; (R) Relegated
