= 2009–10 Libyan Second Division =

Libyan football league season

This article details the 2009–10 Libyan Second Division season.

== Format ==
This year, 47 teams will participate in the competition, split up into 5 groups depending on their geographical location. The top team in each group will progress to the Championship Play-off, where the five teams will play each other home and away to determine the automatic promotion place to the 2010-11 edition of the Libyan Premier League. The second-placed team in this promotion stage will face a two-legged playoff against the 11th placed Premier League team from this season to determine the 12th and final spot in next season's Premier League competition. The bottom team in each of the five groups will be relegated to the Libyan Third Division.

== Promotion & Relegation ==
Teams relegated from 2008–09 Libyan Premier League

- Al Wahda, relegated after losing 4–1 to Al Ahly Benghazi on May 28, 2009
- Wefaq Sabratha, relegated after Aman al Aam's 2–1 victory over Al Ahly Tripoli on June 18, 2009
- Aljazeera, relegated after losing 4–1 to Wefaq Sabratha on June 18, 2009
- Aman al Aam, relegated after Al Hilal's 0–0 draw with Sweahly on June 24, 2009

Teams promoted from 2008 to 2009 Libyan Third Division

- Reaf
- Amal Tarhouna = al amal S.C.
- Shati
- Shabab Al Jabal
- Qurthabia
- Al Hurriya
- Nusoor Mertouba

== Promotion Stage ==
=== Group Winners ===
- Group A - Aljazeera
- Group B - Al Wahda (Tripoli)
- Group C - Harati
- Group D - Benghazi al Jadeeda
- Group E - Darnes

=== Table ===
Pos	Team	Pld	W	D	L	GF	GA	GD	Pts	Promotion or relegation
1	Darnes (C, P)	8	6	1	1	13	7	+6	19	Promotion to Libyan Premier League 2010–11
2	Wahda (A)	8	5	2	1	15	5	+10	17	Relegation Playoff
3	Harati	8	2	3	3	9	12	−3	9	
4	Jazeera	8	1	2	5	9	15	−6	5 (Note: BNGJ 1–1 JAZ; JAZ 2–1 BNGJ)	
5	Benghazi al Jadeeda	8	1	2	5	8	15	−7	5	

Updated to match(es) played on May 25, 2010. Source: kooora.com (in Arabic)
Rules for classification: 1) points; 2) head-to-head points; 3) head-to-head goal difference; 4) head-to-head goals scored; 5) goal difference; 6) number of goals scored.
(A) Advance to a further round; (C) Champions; (P) Promoted

=== Results ===
Home \ Away	BNGJ	DRN	HRT	JAZ	WAH
Benghazi al Jadeeda		0–2	3–1	1–1	1–2
Darnes	3–1		1–0	3–1	2–0
Harati	3–1	0–0		2–1	1–1
Jazeera	2–1	1–2	2–2		0–1
Wahda	0–0	4–0	3–0	3–1	

Updated to match(es) played on 25 May 2010. Source: kooora.com (in Arabic)
Legend: Blue = home team win; Yellow = draw; Red = away team win.
