= 2009–10 Libyan Federation Cup =

The 2009–10 Libyan Federation Cup is the third edition of the competition since its inception in 2007. This competition was designed to give playing time to squad players who do not play in either the league or cup competitions. The competition is also designed to run while the Libyan national team is playing.

== System ==
The 14 Libyan Premier League teams for the 2009–10 season participate in this competition. They are split into four groups, two of three and two of four. These groups are based on geographical location. The teams will play each other home and away. The top team in each of the four groups will progress.

The winners of Group A face the winners of Group C, while the winners of Group B face the winners of Group D. Both matches will be two-legged ties.

The semi-finals and final will also both be two-legged affairs.

== Rules ==
Each participating club must include four reserve-team players on the pitch at all times. This makes sure the youth players get playing time.

== Groups ==
=== Group A ===
Pos	Team	Pld	W	D	L	GF	GA	GD	Pts	AKH	NSR	THD
1	Akhdar	0	0	0	0	0	0	0	0			
2	Nasr	0	0	0	0	0	0	0	0			
3	Tahaddy	0	0	0	0	0	0	0	0			

Updated to match(es) played on pre-season. Source:
Rules for classification: 1) points; 2) head-to-head points; 3) head-to-head goal difference; 4) head-to-head goals scored; 5) goal difference; 6) number of goals scored.

=== Group B ===
Pos	Team	Pld	W	D	L	GF	GA	GD	Pts	AHLB	HIL	NAJ
1	Ahly Benghazi	0	0	0	0	0	0	0	0			
2	Hilal	0	0	0	0	0	0	0	0			
3	Najma	0	0	0	0	0	0	0	0			

Updated to match(es) played on pre-season. Source:
Rules for classification: 1) points; 2) head-to-head points; 3) head-to-head goal difference; 4) head-to-head goals scored; 5) goal difference; 6) number of goals scored.

=== Group C ===
- Ahly Tripoli S.C.
- Madina S.C.
- Khaleej Sirt S.C.
- Olomby S.C.

=== Group D ===
- Ittihad Tripoli S.C.
- Tersanah S.C.
- Sweahly S.C.
- Shat S.C.
