= 2001–02 Libyan Premier League =

Libyan Premier League
- Season: 2001–02

The 2001–02 Libyan Premier League was the 35th edition of the competition, since its inception in 1963. The league was made up of 16 teams, with the first round of matches being played on September 7, 2001, and the last round of matches being played on May 16, 2002.

Ittihad won the championship, on goal difference from Nasr, for their first league title since 1991 and their 9th overall.

Four teams were relegated this season, including two-time champions Mahalla, as the league was reduced from 16 teams to 14 teams. Sawa'ed managed to retain their top flight status by defeating Akhdar 7–3, while rivals Sweahly lost 1–5 to Ittihad, ensuring the Benghazi club stayed up on goal difference.

However, due to suspicions that the Sawa'ed – Akhdar game was thrown, the LFF decided to relegate Sawa'ed and keep Sweahly up.

== League standings ==
Pos	Team	Pld	W	D	L	GF	GA	GD	Pts	Qualification or relegation
1	Ittihad	30	20	7	3	75	23	+52	67	2003 CAF Champions League
2	Nasr	30	20	7	3	53	27	+26	66 (Note: 1 point deducted?)	
3	Hilal	30	14	10	6	50	24	+26	52 (Note: Hilal qualified to the 2003 African Cup Winners' Cup as domestic cup winners.)	
4	Ahly Tripoli	30	13	12	5	48	31	+17	51	
5	Madina	30	14	6	10	47	45	+2	48	
6	Rafiq Sorman	30	12	7	11	33	31	+2	43	
7	Wefaq Sabrata	30	11	8	11	37	39	−2	41	
8	Olomby	30	9	11	10	24	33	−9	38	
9	Tahaddy	30	9	9	12	43	39	+4	36	
10	Tersanah	30	10	6	14	34	43	−9	36	
11	Dhahra Tripoli	30	9	8	13	28	43	−15	35	
12	Sawa'ed	30	8	10	12	40	45	−5	34	
13	Sweahly	30	8	10	12	30	40	−10	34 (Note: Sawa'ed relegated due to LFF decision.)	Relegation to 2002–03 Libyan Second Division
14	Mahalla	30	6	10	14	33	50	−17	28	Relegation to 2002–03 Libyan Second Division
15	Akhdar	30	5	7	18	32	55	−23	22	Relegation to 2002–03 Libyan Second Division
16	Murooj	30	6	4	20	24	63	−39	22	Relegation to 2002–03 Libyan Second Division

Source: RSSSF
Rules for classification: 1) points; 2) goal difference; 3) number of goals scored.

== Top scorers ==
- Al-Saadi Gaddafi (Ittihad) - 19 goals
- Abdulrazaaq Jlidi - 18 goals
- Ali al Milyaan - 15 goals
