= Rasheed al Deasy =

Moroccan footballer (born 1981)

Rasheed Mohammad al Deasy (Arabic: رشيد محمد الديسي), born March 4, 1981) is a Moroccan footballer currently playing for Libyan Premier League club Shat as a striker.

== Biography ==
Though Moroccan, al Deasy has spent the majority of his playing career in Libya. His first club was Urouba, where he scored 3 goals in the 2004–05 season, alongside top scorer Sheikh Sedao to help fire the Ajaylat club into second place. Despite this, al Deasy moved away, a lack of appearances of the reasons behind this.

He then moved to Tripoli club Wahda in the summer of 2005, spending three years there before moving to cross-city rivals Shat.

Since moving to the Zaawiyat-al-Dahmani club, al Deasy has enjoyed his largest period of success. He has led the line on his own, and he has been successful. In his first season, 2008–09, the Moroccan scored 8 goals to help steer the club clear of relegation.

In 2009–10, however, al Deasy has reached his peak, scoring 9 goals to top the scoring charts before the mid-season break, including vital winning goals at Tahaddy & Sweahly.
