= Al Khums SC =

Libyan football club

Al Khums
- Full name: Al-Khums Sports Cultural Social Club
- Nickname: El-Qal'a Ez-Zarqa (The Blue Castle)
- Founded: 1958
- Ground: Al-Khums Stadium, Al Khums, Libya
- Manager: Mohamed Ismail
- League: Libyan Premier League
Home colours

Al Khums Sports Cultural Social Club (Arabic: نادي الخمس الرياضي الثقافي الإجتماعي) is a Libyan football club based in Al Khums which plays in the Libyan Premier League. The club plays its home games at Al Khums Stadium in Alriadya neighbourhood.

== History ==
At the end of the 1950s, there was an urgent necessity and urgent need for the emergence of culture, sports and the arts in the city of Khoms, a city that had a distinct wealth of ambitious young people who were jealous of their city, and amid the four walls of what was known as "Ghuma's shop". The spark for the beginning of sports activities, especially football, as a football team was made to become legitimate and entitled to participate in sports courses. These were undertaked for the benefit of sport. The required documentation & licences were given to the young people of this city. Listed below were among the founders of the club:

- Mohammed Hadaar
- Rajab Mohammed Dhuwaila
- Sadiq Muftah Morjane
- Mohammed Yahya Ali
- Mahmoud Harati
- Achour Abdel'aaly
- Mohamed Hadiya
- Abdulrahman Abu 'Amoud

A base of operations, a transport station, was found, although this did not last long, as the club used the hotel in Khoms, between 1965 and 1966. The club changed location again, this time behind the Arab Cement Building in Khoms, where it remains today.

In 2012, the club changed its name from Al Harati Sports Cultural Social Club to Al Khums Sports Cultural Social Club.

In 2016 the club promoted to the Libyan Premier League for the first time in its history.

== League positions ==
Season	League	Final position	Notes
2004/2005	Libyan Second Division	5th in Group A	–
2005/2006	Libyan Second Division	2nd in Group A	lost in promotion playoff
2006/2007	Libyan Second Division	8th in Group B	–
2007/2008	Libyan Second Division	10th in Group A	–
2008/2009	Libyan Second Division	3rd in Group A	–
2009/2010	Libyan Second Division	1st in Group C	3rd in promotion playoff thus missing promotion
2010/2011	Libyan Second Division	2nd in Group A	was Second in Group B when the league canceled due to Libyan Civil War 2011
2011/2012	No League Played due to civil war	–	–
2012/2013	No League Played due to civil war	–	–
2013/2014	Libyan Second Division	2nd in Group C	–
2014/2015	No League Played	–	–
2016	Libyan Second Division	1st in Group B	Promoted
2017-18	Libyan Premier League	4th in Group 4	
