= Qurdabia Sabha =

Libyan football club

Al Qurdabia Sabha
- Full name: Al Qurdabia Sports Club
- Founded: 1958
- League: Libyan Premier League
- 2017–18: 8th Group A

Al Qurdabia (Arabic: القرضابية) is a Libyan football club based in Sabha which plays in the Libyan Premier League.
