= Pierre Koulibaly =

Burkinabé footballer

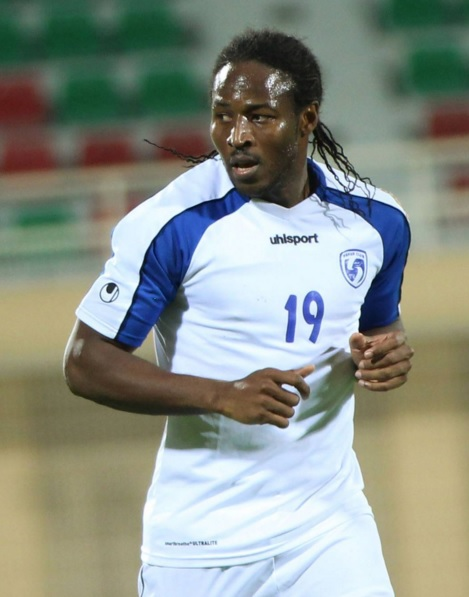
- Pan Pierre Koulibaly, Burkinabé footballer

Personal information
- Full name: Pan Pierre Koulibaly
- Date of birth: 24 March 1986 (age 40)
- Place of birth: Bobo-Dioulasso, Burkina Faso
- Height: 1.81 m (5 ft 11 in)
- Position: Striker

Youth career
- EFO

Senior career*
Years	Team	Apps	(Gls)
2005–2007	EFO	?	(?)
2007–2010	Al-Ittihad	?	(29)
2008	→ Al-Nasr (loan)	?	(?)
2011–2012	KV Mechelen	12	(1)
2012	→ SK Sint-Niklaas (loan)	15	(5)
2012–2013	Montegnée	18	(11)
2013–2015	Al-Dhaid	53	(48)
2016–2017	Saham	8	(6)
2016–2017	JS Kasbah Tadla	7	(2)
2018–2019	EFO	?	(1)

International career
2006–2013	Burkina Faso	5	(0)
Medal record
Representing Burkina Faso
Africa Cup of Nations
Runner-up	2013 South Africa
- * Club domestic league appearances and goals

Pan Pierre Koulibaly (born 24 March 1986), commonly known as Pierre Koulibaly, is a Burkinabé professional footballer .

== Personal life ==
Pierre's twin brother, Paul Koulibaly is also a professional footballer.

== Club career ==
=== Étoile Filante de Ouagadougou (EFO) ===
Pierre began his professional footballing career in 2005 with his parent club, Étoile Filante de Ouagadougou. In his two-year spell with the Ouagadougou-based club, he helped them win the 2006 Coupe du Faso and also the 2005–06 Burkinabé SuperCup. In late December 2006, news speculated that Tunisian giants, Étoile Sportive du Sahel and Club Africain are interested in obtaining the services of the 19-year old Burkinabé footballer.

=== Al-Ittihad ===
He first moved out of Burkina Faso in 2007 to North Africa and more accurately to Libya where he signed a three-year contract with Tripoli's Al-Ittihad Club. In his three-year spell with the Tripoli-based club, he helped them win the 2008–09 Libyan Premier League and the 2009–10 Libyan Premier League, the 2009 Libyan Cup and the 2010 Libyan Super Cup.

=== Al-Nasr ===
In January 2008, the Burkinabé international was loaned to his former club's rivals and another Libyan giants, Al-Nasr SC of Benghazi.

=== KV Mechelen ===
Following a massive three-week-old uprising that had rocked the North African nation, Libya, Pierre fled the crisis in Libya and moved to Europe and more accurately to Belgium where he was immediately subjected to a trial at Belgian Pro League club, KV Mechelen.

On 28 January 2011, he signed a one-year contract with the Mechelen-based club. He made his Belgian Pro League debut and scored his first goal on 12 February 2011 in a 3–1 win over K.V.C. Westerlo. He scored 1 goal in 6 appearances in the 2010–11 Belgian Pro League.

He made his first appearance in the 2011–12 Belgian Pro League on 5 August 2011 in a 3–1 loss against Belgian giants, R.S.C. Anderlecht. He also made his Belgian Cup debut on 21 September 2011 in a 3–0 win over K.V. Oostende in the Round 6 of the 2011–12 Belgian Cup. He made 6 appearances in the 2011–12 Belgian Pro League.

=== SK Sint-Niklaas ===
In December 2011, he moved to Sint-Niklaas where on 1 January 2012 he moved on loan on a six-month contract to Belgian Second Division club, Sportkring Sint-Niklaas, commonly known as, SK Sint-Niklaas. He made his Belgian Second Division debut and scored his first goal on 15 January 2012 in a 2–2 draw against R. White Star Bruxelles. He scored 5 goals in 12 appearances in the 2011–12 Belgian Second Division.

=== Montegnée ===
Later in June 2012, he moved to Saint-Nicolas, Liège where he signed a six-month contract with Belgian Provincial League club, R.R.F.C. Montegnée.

=== Al-Thaid ===
Later in 2012, he again made a move out of Burkina Faso and this time to the Middle East and more accurately to the United Arab Emirates where he signed a two-year contract with UAE First Division League club, Al-Thaid. He made his UAE First Division League debut on 10 November 2012 in a 1–0 win over Al-Fujairah SC and scored his first goal on 16 November 2012 in a 2–0 win over Hatta Club. He came into limelight after scoring a number of braces in the competition against teams like Al-Rams, Masafi Club, Al-Khaleej Club and Al-Jazira Al-Hamra. He also scored a hat-trick in the 2012–13 season in a 4–4 draw against Hatta Club. He scored 14 goals in 17 matches in the 2012–13 UAE First Division League.

He made his first appearance in the 2013–14 season and scored his first goal on 28 September 2013 in a 2–1 win over Al-Ittihad Kalba SC in the Preliminary Qualification for the 2013–14 UAE President's Cup. In the very next match in the competition, he scored a brace helping his side secure a 2–1 win over Dibba Al-Hisn Sports Club and helping them advance to the Round 8 of the Preliminary Qualification where too he scored a goal in a 3–2 loss against UAE Pro League side, Al-Nasr Dubai SC. He made his first appearance in the 2013–14 UAE First Division League on 16 November 2013 in a 3–1 loss against Dibba Al-Hisn Sports Club and scored his first goal on 27 December 2013 in a 2–1 win over Al-Tawoon CSC. The Burkinabé international earned the praise of many in the nation as he scored a total of 16 goals in six consecutive games towards the end of the season which included a brace on 25 April 2014 in a 4–3 loss against Al-Fujairah SC, 3 consecutive hat-tricks in a 5–0 win over Al-Tawoon CSC, 3–0 win over Al-Khaleej Club and a 4–1 win over Masafi Club within a span of two weeks and a super hat-trick on 2 February 2015 in a 4–0 win over Al-Rams. thus scoring a total of 24 goals in 23 appearances in the 2013–14 season of UAE's First Division League. He scored 4 goals in 3 appearances in the Preliminary Qualification for the 2013–14 UAE President's Cup.

In the 2014–15 season, he made his first appearance and scored his first goal on 13 September 2014 in a 2–2 draw against Al-Urooba in the 2014–15 UAE FA Cup. He made his first appearance in the 2014–15 UAE First Division League on 15 November 2014 in a 3–3 draw against Al-Khaleej Club and scored his first goal on 28 November 2014 in a 1–1 draw against Hatta Club. His goal tally also included a super hat-trick on 3 April 2015 in a 4–1 win over Al-Tawoon CSC. He scored 10 goals in 13 appearances in the 2014-15 UAE First Division League and 3 goals in 3 appearances in the 2014–15 UAE FA Cup thus ending his three-year long spell with the Sharjah-based club.

=== Saham ===
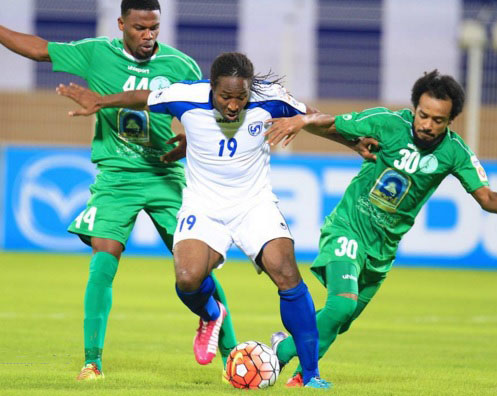
Pan Pierre Koulibaly – Oman Professional League

In January 2015, he again moved out to the Middle East and this time to Oman where he signed a six-month contract with Oman Professional League club, Saham Club. He made his debut and scored his first goal for the club on 14 January 2015 in a 2–2 draw against Al-Shabab Club in the Round of 16 of the 2015–16 Sultan Qaboos Cup which was later won 5–3 on penalties by Saham, which included a penalty from the Burkinabé international. He made his Oman Professional League debut on 18 January 2016 in a 0–0 draw against Al-Khabourah SC and scored his first goal on 23 January 2016 in a 3–1 loss against Al-Nahda Club.

== Career statistics ==
Appearances and goals by club, season and competition
Club	Season	Division	League		Cup		Continental		Other		Total	
Club	Season	Division	Apps	Goals	Apps	Goals	Apps	Goals	Apps	Goals	Apps	Goals
KV Mechelen	2010–11	Belgian Pro League	6	1	0	0	0	0	0	0	6	1
KV Mechelen	2011–12	Belgian Pro League	6	0	1	0	0	0	0	0	7	0
KV Mechelen	Total		12	1	1	0	0	0	0	0	13	1
SK Sint-Niklaas	2011–12	Belgian Second Division	12	5	0	0	0	0	0	0	12	5
Al-Thaid	2012–13	UAE First Division League	17	14	0	0	0	0	0	0	12	5
Al-Thaid	2013–14	UAE First Division League	23	24	3	4	0	0	0	0	26	28
Al-Thaid	2014–15	UAE First Division League	13	10	3	3	0	0	0	0	16	13
Al-Thaid	Total		53	48	6	7	0	0	0	0	59	55
Saham	2015–16	Oman Professional League	8	6	1	1	0	0	0	0	8	6
Career total			85	60	8	8	0	0	0	0	93	68
