= Akram Ayyad =

Libyan footballer (born 1991)

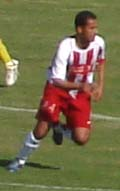

Personal information
- Full name: Akram Seifeddine Kanzari al-Ayyad
- Date of birth: 23 November 1991 (age 34)
- Place of birth: Benghazi, Libya
- Height: 1.78 m (5 ft 10 in)
- Position: Midfielder

Team information
- Current team: CS Hammam-Lif
- Number: 6

Youth career
- 2009–2010: Al Ahly Benghazi

Senior career*
Years	Team	Apps	(Gls)
2010	Al Ahly Benghazi	0	(0)
2010–	CS Hammam-Lif	21	(0)
2013–2014	→AS Djerba (loan)	?	(?)
- * Club domestic league appearances and goals

Akram Seifeddine Kanzari al-Ayyad (born 23 November 1991) is a Libyan football midfielder who currently plays in the Tunisian Championship for CS Hammam-Lif.
