= Ahmed Zuway =

Libyan footballer (born 1982)

Personal information
- Full name: Ahmed Mahmoud Abdelkarim Al-Zuway
- Date of birth: 28 December 1982 (age 43)
- Place of birth: Benghazi, Libya
- Height: 1.88 m (6 ft 2 in)
- Position: Striker

Youth career
- Al Hilal

Senior career*
Years	Team	Apps	(Gls)
2001–2004	Al Naser		
2004–2007	Al Ahly Benghazi	40+	(22+)
2007	Al Qadisiya	8	(4)
2008–2011	Al Ittihad Tripoli	37+	(13+)
2011–2012	CA Bizertin	25	(13)
2012–2013	Al Sharjah	22	(7)
2013–2014	Al Ahly Benghazi		
2014–2015	CA Bizertin	8	(2)
2015–2016	Zakho FC		
2016–2018	Al Ittihad Tripoli		
Total		140+	(61+)

International career
2005–2013	Libya	22	(5)
- * Club domestic league appearances and goals

Ahmed Mahmoud Abdelkarim Al-Zuway (Arabic: أحمد الزوي; born 28 December 1982), better known better as Kabila, is a Libyan former footballer who played as a striker. He played club football for Al Naser, Al Ahly Benghazi, Al Qadisiya, Al Ittihad Tripoli, CA Bizertin, Al Sharjah, and Zakho FC, and international football for the Libya national team.

== Career ==
On 2 October 2012, Zuway joined United Arab Emirates club Al Sharjah SC.
