= Moataz Ben Amer =

Libyan football player (born 1981)

Moataz Ben Amer معتز بن عامر
Personal information
- Full name: Moataz Ali Mohamed Ben Amer
- Date of birth: 1981 (age 44–45)
- Position: Defender

Senior career*
Years	Team	Apps	(Gls)
2004–2012	Al Ahly Benghazi		
2012–2013	CS Hammam-Lif		
2013–2014	Al Ahly Benghazi		

International career
2001–2011	Libya	4	(0)
- * Club domestic league appearances and goals

Moataz Ali Mohamed Ben Amer (Arabic: معتزمحمدعلي بن عامر; born 1981) is a Libyan former footballer who played for his hometown club Al Ahly Benghazi and for the Libyan national team.
