= Al Ittihad Gheryan =

Libyan football club

Al Ittihad Gheryan (Arabic: اتحاد غريان) is a Libyan football club based in Gharyan in western Libya, south of Tripoli. The club currently plays in the Libyan Second Division (2008–09), having been promoted from the Libyan Third Division the season before. The club plays its home games at the GMR Stadium, located in the heart of Tripoli's sporting city.
