= Shabaab al Jabal =

Libyan football club

- Founded: 1974
- Ground: Shahhat Stadium; Shahhat, Libya
- Capacity: 10,000
- League: First Division (II)
- 2023–24: 4th (Group 4)

Shabaab al Jabal is a Libyan football club based in Shahhat in the Jabal al Akhdar region of eastern Libya. The club plays in the Libyan Premier League.

Shabaab al Jabal had a decent cup run in the 2008–09 season, culminating in a third-round draw at the 11 June Stadium, where they faced Ittihad Tripoli. However, they were defeated 5–0.
