= Al-Mustaqbal (football) =

Libyan football club

Al Mustaqbal (Arabic: المستقبل)
- Founded: 1966
- League: Libyan Premier League

Al Mustaqbal (Arabic: المستقبل) is a football club from Jumayl, near Zuwara, in the west of Libya. It plays in the Libyan Premier League
