= Al Urouba (Ajelat) =

Libyan football club

Al Urouba Ajelat
- Full name: Al Urouba Ajelat
- Founded: 7 May 1957
- Ground: Ajaylat Stadium; Ajaylat, Libya
- Capacity: 2,000
- League: Libyan Second Division
- 2007-08: Libyan Premier League, 14th (Relegated)

Al Urouba Ajelat (Arabic: العروبة) is a Libyan football club based in Ajaylat, Libya. They play their homes games at Ajaylat Stadium. The club's best ever finish was in the 2004-05 season, when they finished runners-up to Al Ittihad. However, just a season later, they were relegated to the Libyan Second Division, where they spent one season before returning to the top flight. However, they did not fare as well this time, and were relegated in 14th place, just 4 points from safety.
