= Al-Yarmouk (Libya) =

Libyan football club

- Ground: Libya

Al-Yarmouk is a Libyan football club based in Janzour, near Tripoli. The club was runner-up of the 1997 Libyan Cup.

The team previously played in the Libyan Premier League and played in the Libyan Second Division during the 2008–09 season.
