= Al Sawa'ed =

Libyan football club

Al Sawa'ed (Arabic: السواعد) is a football club based in Benghazi, Libya. They compete in the Libyan First Division, the second tier of Libyan football. The club was founded in the 1977. Al Sawa'ed has never qualified for the Libyan Premier League. Their best achievement was qualifying for the round of 16 in the Libyan Cup during the 2004/5 season, and losing in preliminaries for the first division in 2007/8 to Wefaq Sabratha. Al Sawa'ed finished third in Group 3 of the First Division during the 2021/2 season.
