= Jumayl, Libya =

Jumayl الجميل
- Town
- Location in Libya
- Coordinates: 32°51′10″N 12°03′40″E
- Country: Libya
- District: Nuqat al Khams

Population (2010)
  - Total: 102,000
- Time zone: UTC+2 (EET)
- License Plate Code: 40

Jumayl (Al Jamīl, El Gemil and Aljmail) (Arabic: الجميل Favor) is a town in central Nuqat al Khams District of western Libya. It is located about 10 kilometres (6 mi) southwest of Libya's Mediterranean Sea port in the city of Zuwarah. As of 2010, Jumayl had an estimated population of 102,000.
