= Zuwara Stadium =

Sports venue in Zuwara, Libya

Coordinates: 32.9240°N 12.1016°E

Zuwara Stadium is a multi-purpose stadium in Zuwarah, Libya. It is currently used mostly for football matches and is the home ground of Aljazeera SC. The stadium holds 2,000 people.
