= Al Andalus Tobruk =

Libyan football club

Al-Andalus SC
- Full name: Al-Andalus Sports Club
- Founded: 1969
- Ground: Tobruk Stadium, Tobruk, Libya
- Capacity: 2,000
- Manager: Muftah Mqairhy
- League: Libyan Second Division
- 2007–08: Group C, 8th

Al-Andalus Sports Club (Arabic: الأندلس) is a Libyan football club, currently playing in the Libyan Second Division. The club hails from the city of Tobruk, in the far east of Libya. They play at Tobrok Stadium, which they share with their city rivals, Suqoor.

== 2015–16 season ==
=== Current squad ===
As of 24 November 2017 Note: Flags indicate national team as defined under FIFA eligibility rules; some limited exceptions apply. Players may hold more than one non-FIFA nationality.

| No. | Pos. | Nation | Player |
|---|---|---|---|
| 11 | GK | LBY | Muhammad Jolaffi |
