= Derna Stadium =

Multi-use stadium in Derna, Libya

Coordinates: 32°45′5.64″N 22°39′44″E

Derna Stadium (Arabic: ملعب درنة) is a multi-use stadium in Derna, Libya. It is currently used mostly for football matches and is the home ground of Darnes and Al-Afreeki SC. The stadium has a seating capacity of 7,000 people.

The stadium sustained severe damage from floods caused by Storm Daniel in 2023.
