= Al Ta'awon SC =

Libyan football club

Al Ta'awon
- Full name: Al Ta'awon Sports Club
- Founded: 1960
- Ground: Martyrs of Benina Stadium
- Capacity: 10,550
- Manager: Rachid Ghaflaoui
- League: Libyan Premier League
- 2023–24: 5th (Group 1)

Al Ta'awon (Arabic: التعاون) is a Libyan football club based in Ajdabya which plays in the Libyan Premier League.

== See also ==
- Category:Al Ta'awon SC players
