= Abi al Ashar =

Libyan football club

- Full name: Abi al Ashar Sports Club
- Founded: 1986
- League: Libyan Premier League

Abi al Ashar (Arabic: أبي الأشهر) is a Libyan football club based in Tajura, Tripoli which played in the Libyan Premier League in 2018.
