= Al Bayda Stadium =

Sports venue in Bayda, Libya

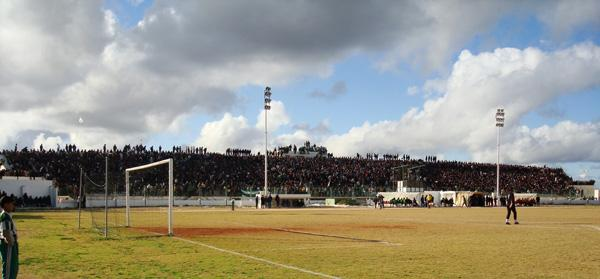
- Interactive map of Al Bayda Stadium
- Location: Bayda, Libya
- Coordinates: 32°45′59″N 21°44′30″E
- Operator: Akhdar, Al Ansar
- Capacity: 10,000
- Field size: 70 metres (77 yd) by 110 metres (120 yd)

Construction
- Opened: 1984

Al Bayda Stadium, otherwise known as Al Watheeq al Khadhraa Stadium (Arabic: ملعب البيضاء) or is a multi-purpose stadium in Bayda, Libya. It is currently used mostly for football matches and is the home ground of Al Akhdar Al Bayda'. The stadium holds 10,000 people.
