= Al Ansar Club (Libya) =

Libyan football club

Al Ansar
- Full name: Al Ansar
- Founded: 1984
- Ground: Green Document Stadium; Bayda
- Capacity: 10,000
- League: third degree
- third degree: 5th
| Home colours | Away colours |

AlAnsar (Arabic: نادي الأنصار الليبي) is a Libyan football club based in Bayda, Libya.
