= Ajaylat =

Ajaylat العجيلات
- Town
- Location in Libya
- Coordinates: 32°45′25″N 12°22′34″E
- Country: Libya
- Region: Tripolitania
- District: Nuqat al Khams

Population
  - Total: 4,878
- Time zone: UTC+2 (EET)
- License Plate Code: 41

Ajaylat (Arabic: العجيلات al ʿajaylat) is the name of a region and small city located in the Nuqat al Khams district of Libya. It is located roughly 80 kilometers west of Tripoli. From 1983 to 1988, the region was a district of Libya with the city as its capital.

== Tribal groups ==
The regional tribal groups (qabā’il) are currently subdivided into two primary tribal federations or sections. The first of these is known as Gehat al-Wadi (جهة الوادي) Aulād Hamid, which consists of; Al-e’rīshāt ( العريشات); Al-ma’īzāt (المعيزات); Ul-qauādī (القواضى); and Al-hersheh (الهرشة) tribes.

The second tribal federation is known as the Aulād Rāshid (اولاد راشد), which consists of; Aulād Al-Sheikh; and Aulād Rāshid. Aulad Al-Shikh (اولاد الشيخ) which consists of Aulad Mousa (اولاد موسى) Aulad Bozed (اولاد ابوزيد) Al-Mashara (المشارة), and Al-Draba (الدرباء) tribes.

The total population in the minţaqa (area) Al-A’jēlāt is estimated at 100,000 individuals scattered among those tribes.

== Economy ==
The Ajaylat region is most famous for the cultivation of palm trees, olives and various types of vegetables. There is also a medical center.

== Libyan civil war ==
On 14 August 2011, anti-Gaddafi forces fighting in the Libyan Civil War claimed they had taken Ajaylat.
