= Zaawia Stadium =

Sports venue in Zawiya, Libya

- Interactive map of Zaawia Stadium
- Location: Zawiya, Libya
- Coordinates: 32°45′14″N 12°44′21″E
- Owner: Olomby
- Operator: Olomby
- Capacity: 14,000 (6,000 seated)
- Surface: Grass
- Field size: 68 metres (74 yd) by 105 metres (115 yd)

Tenant
- Olomby

Zaawia Stadium is a multi-purpose stadium in Zawiya, Libya. The stadium holds 14,000 people.

It is currently used mostly for football matches and is the home ground of Al Olympic Zaouia.
