= Nojom Ajdabiya =

Libyan football club

Nojoom Ajdabiya
- Full name: Nojoom Ajdabiya
- Founded: 1984
- Ground: 10 March Stadium; Ajdabiya, Libya
- Capacity: 2,000
- League: Libyan Premier League
- 2017–18: 22nd

Nojom Ajdabiya (Arabic: نجوم اجدابيا) (English: Ajdabiya Stars) is a Libyan football club based in Ajdabiya, North-East Libya. The club was founded in 1984, and is one of five clubs in Ajdabiya. The club participated in the Libyan Second Division in the 2006–07 season, and was promoted in what was its first season in the division. However, the squad was way out of its depth in the Libyan Premier League, and was relegated with just 16 points from 30 games.
