= Aljazeera SC =

Libyan football club

Al-Jazeera
- Full name: Al-Jazeera Zuwara
- Nickname: Al-Jazeera FC
- Founded: 11 November 1948
- Ground: Zuwara Stadium; Zuwara, Libya
- Capacity: 2,000
- Manager: (Libya) Mohameed Ahmeada
- League: Libyan Premier League
- 2007–08: 10th

Al-Jazeera Zuwara (Arabic: الجزيرة) is a Libyan football club based in Zuwara, Libya. They play their home games at Zuwara Stadium.

== Current squad ==
As of 2008–09 season Note: Flags indicate national team as defined under FIFA eligibility rules; some limited exceptions apply. Players may hold more than one non-FIFA nationality.

No.	Pos.	Nation	Player
1	GK	LBY	Abdusalam Msalam
2	DF	LBY	Abdulrahman Alzwaoui
3	DF	LBY	Kheiri Alfaqi
4	DF	LBY	Ahmed Mosbah
5	DF	LBY	Mohamed Mosbah
6	MF	LBY	Aymen Al-Haaji
7	MF	LBY	Hussein Al-Idrissy (Captain)
8	DF	LBY	Marwan Gholaam
9	FW	LBY	Abdullah Alzawaam
10	FW	LBY	Rabee' Mslaty
11	FW	LBY	Salim Al-Mansouri
12	MF	LBY	Basim Ghriba
13	DF	GUI	Fofana Ma Antigi

No.	Pos.	Nation	Player
14	FW	LBY	Ihab Boussefi (on loan from Al Ittihad)
15	DF	LBY	Mohamed Shleeq (on loan from Al Ahly Tripoli)
16	FW	LBY	Ilyas Al-'Ashayni
17	DF	LBY	Nader Qresh
18	MF	CMR	Djam Ronald Kufon
19	FW	LBY	Khalifa Al-Qahwaji
20	GK	LBY	Nizar Qresh (on loan from Al Ittihad)
21	GK	LBY	Fadi Shushan
22	MF	LBY	Othman Wanees
23	MF	LBY	Mansour Al Borki (on loan from Al Ittihad)
24	MF	LBY	Abubakr Al-Soukni
25	MF	LBY	Muftah Al-Mraimy
