= GMR Stadium =

Football stadium in Tripoli, Libya

Great Manmade River Stadium
- Interactive map of Great Manmade River Stadium
- Location: Tripoli, Libya
- Coordinates: 32°51′35″N 13°8′13″E
- Owner: Libyan Football Federation
- Operator: Tripoli clubs
- Capacity: 8,000
- Surface: Artificial turf

Construction
- Built: 1999-2000
- Opened: 17 May 2000

The Great Manmade River Stadium (GMR or GMMR stadium) is a football stadium just a few metres away from the 11 June Stadium in the heart of Tripoli, Libya.
