= Asswehly SC =

Libyan football clube

Asswehly Sports Club
- Full name: Asswehly Sports Club
- Nicknames: Red Knights; Martyrs Brigades
- Founded: 11 May 1944; 82 years ago
- Ground: Misrata Stadium, Misrata City
- Capacity: 10,000
- Chairman: Ibrahim Dbeibah
- Manager: Hamadi Al-Qwiry
- League: Libyan Premier League
- 2025–26: 1st (Champions)
Home colours	Away colours	Third colours

Asswehly Sports Club (Arabic: نادي السويحلي الرياضي) is a Libyan professional football club based in Misrata. The club is playing in the Libyan Premier League.

== History ==
Asswehly Sports Club was founded on 11 May 1944 as The Workers Club, and then changes the name into:

- Alislah: 17 November 1945
- That Arremal: 30 June 1948
- Alahly Misrata: 1951
- Asswehly: 1972

Asswehly has got teams competing in different sports.

== Honours ==
- Libyan Premier League: 1

2025-2026

- Libyan Second Division: 12

1965, 1967, 1969, 1971, 1973, 1975, 1979, 1982, 1988, 1990, 1992, 1996

- Libyan Cup: 0

Finalist: 1993-1994, 1999-2000

- Champion of Tripoli Province: 1

1962

== Performance in UAFA competitions ==
- Arab Cup Winners' Cup: 1 appearance

Arab Cup Winners' Cup 2002: Second Round

== Current squad ==
Updated 21 October, 2026

Note: Flags indicate national team as defined under FIFA eligibility rules; some limited exceptions apply. Players may hold more than one non-FIFA nationality.

No.	Pos.	Nation	Player
1	GK	LBA	Ammar Masood
4	DF	TUN	Nader Ghandri
5	DF	LBA	Ahmed Saleh
6	MF	LBA	Abdulmunem Akasha
7	FW	LBA	Mouad Eissa
8	FW	LBA	Sanad Al Warfali
9	FW	MLI	Fily Traoré
10	FW	ZAM	Lameck Banda
11	FW	LBA	Mohammed Soulah
12	GK	LBA	Mohammed Tehami
13	MF	LBA	Jebril Ejfala
14	MF	LBA	Abdallah Al Orfi
15	MF	LBA	Amjed Al-Gsheim
16	MF	GHA	Kwasi Sibo
17	MF	CGO	Débora Fernandes

No.	Pos.	Nation	Player
18	MF	LBA	Noor Aldeen Al-Qulaib
19	MF	TUN	Ayoub Ayed
20	MF	LBA	Zad Al-Kheer Boukhawa
21	MF	LBA	Abdulrahman Jahan
22	DF	LBA	Ali El-Zawawi
23	DF	LBA	Saif Jaddour
24	MF	LBA	Meftah Ben Taher
25	FW	NGR	Otto John
26	DF	LBA	Ahmed Huwaydi
27	MF	LBA	Meftah Al Milani
28	DF	LBA	Muayid Jaddour
29	GK	LBA	Mouad Al-Mansouri
30	DF	LBA	Saeb Ehmeid

== Coaching staff ==
Position	Name
Manager	(Libya) Hamadi Al-Qwiry
Assistant manager	(Libya) Hamali Al-Ashhab
Goalkeeper coach	(Libya) Mohamed Boussefi
Fitness Coach	(Tunisia) Zied Zioud
Performance Analyst	(Tunisia) Mejdi Amine
