= Annajma SC =

Libyan football club

- Full name: Annajma Sports Club
- Founded: 1943; 82 years ago
- Ground: Martyrs of February Stadium, Benghazi, Libya
- Capacity: 10,550
- League: Libyan Premier League

Annajma (Arabic: النجمة) is a Libyan football club based in Benghazi which plays in the Libyan Premier League.
