= Darnes SC =

Libyan football club

Darnes club
- Full name: Darnes Sports, Culture and Socials Club
- Nickname: The Elegant
- Founded: 1958; 68 years ago
- Ground: Derna Stadium; Derna, Libya
- Capacity: 7,000
- Chairman: Souhaib Boushiha
- Manager: Intisar Shinab
- League: Libyan Premier League
- 2022-23: 5th

Darnes Sports Club (Arabic: نادي دارنس) is a Libyan football club based in Derna, Libya. The team once reached second in the 1965–1966 Libyan Premier League season, by winning 2–1 in Derna, but lost the 2nd leg in Tripoli 2–0 against Ittihad Tripoli. The Clubs Football Activities have been suspended until the 2024/25 season by the Libyan Football Federation due to Storm Daniel, the team will retain its place in the Libyan Premier League that season.
