= Libyan Second Division =

- Founded: 1963
- Country: Libya
- Number of clubs: 39 (in 7 groups)
- Level on pyramid: 2
- Promotion to: Libyan Premier League
- Relegation to: Libyan Third Division
- Domestic cup: Libyan Cup
- Current champions: Al Sadaqa (2017–18)
- Current: Libyan Second Division 2025–26

The Libyan Second Division is the second tier of the Libyan football championship, organised by Libyan Football Federation.

== Winners list ==
- 2004-05 – Al Ahly (Benghazi)
- 2005-06 – Al Nasr
- 2006-07 – Al Wahda
- 2007-08 – Al Hilal
- 2008-09 – Najma
- 2009-10 – Darnes
