= Branko Smiljanić =

Serbian footballer and manager

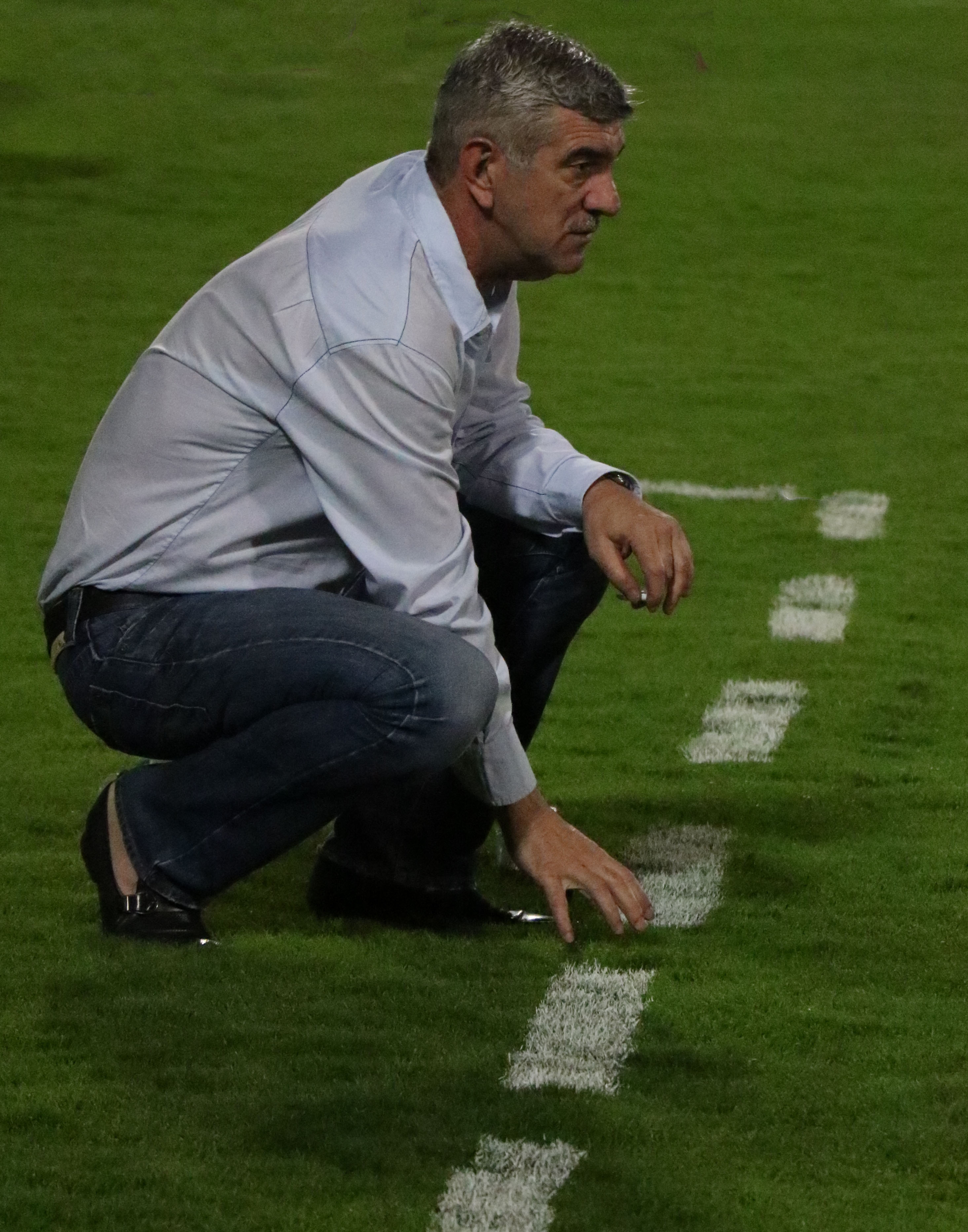
- Smiljanić with Saham in 2015

Personal information
- Date of birth: 27 September 1957 (age 69)
- Place of birth: Belgrade, PR Serbia, Yugoslavia
- Height: 1.84 m (6 ft 0 in)
- Position: Forward

Senior career*
| Years | Team | Apps | (Gls) |
| 1978 | Mercator | | |
| 1979–1981 | OFK Beograd | | |
| 1981–1983 | Sloboda Užice | | |
| 1983–1985 | Kalmar AIK | | |
| 1985–1988 | Mönsterås | | |
| 1988–1993 | Obilić | | |

International career
| 1974–1975 | Yugoslavia U20 | | |

Managerial career
- 1993–1995: Obilić U20
- 1995–1996: Obilić (assistant)
- 1996–1997: Mladi Radnik
- 1997–1998: Sloga Kraljevo
- 1998–1999: Borac Čačak
- 1999–2000: Milicionar
- 2001: Radnički Obrenovac
- 2001–2002: Jordan
- 2002–2003: Sutjeska Nikšić
- 2003–2004: Al-Faisaly
- 2004: Vojvodina
- 2005: Sutjeska Nikšić
- 2005–2006: Al-Faisaly
- 2006–2008: Ittihad
- 2008–2009: Libya U20
- 2009–2010: Libya
- 2012–2013: Al-Wehdat
- 2013: Smederevo
- 2013–2014: Ittihad
- 2014: Napredak Kruševac
- 2014–2015: Saham
- 2016: BEC-Tero Sasana
- 2016–2017: Al-Faisaly
- 2017: Mladost Podgorica
- 2017–2018: Ahli
- * Club domestic league appearances and goals

Branko Smiljanić (born 27 September 1957) is a Serbian football manager and former player.

== Playing career ==
In 1978, Smiljanić signed a one-year contract with Mercator Ljubljana. He moved to OFK Beograd in 1979. In 1981, he signed a long-term contract with FK Sloboda Užice.

He first moved out of Serbia in 1983 to Sweden where he signed a contract with Kalmar AIK FK. After a two-year spell with the Kalmar-based club, he signed a contract with FC Mönsterås.

In 1988, he moved back to Serbia and signed with FK Obilić and played there for the next 5 years.

== Managerial career ==
Smiljanić received the UEFA Pro Licence in 2007 from the Football Association of Serbia. He also holds the UEFA A License (from the Football Association of Serbia and Montenegro since 2005), UEFA B License (from the Swedish Football Association since 1988) and also the UEFA C License (from the Swedish Football Association since 1987). He has also obtained a graduate degree in Physical Education in 1996 from the University of Novi Sad.

He began his professional managerial career with the U-20 team of FK Obilić in 1993. In 1995, he was appointed the assistant coach of the first team. In his one-year spell with the club, he helped them achieve the runners-up position in the 1994–95 FR Yugoslavia Cup.

In 1996, he was appointed the head coach of FK Mladi Radnik. In 1997, he was appointed the head coach of FK Sloga Kraljevo. In 1998, he was appointed the head coach of FK Borac Čačak and helped the club win the 1998–99 Second League of FR Yugoslavia (West). In 1999, he was appointed the head coach of FK Milicionar.

He first moved out of Serbia to Jordan in 2001 where he was appointed manager of the Jordan national team.

In 2002, he moved back to FR Yugoslavia where he was appointed the head coach of FK Sutjeska Nikšić.

In 2003, he moved back to Jordan and to the capital city, Amman where he was appointed the head coach of Jordan League club, Al-Faisaly SC. In his one-year spell with the Amman-based club, he helped them secure the second position in the 2003–04 Jordan League, win the 2004 Jordan FA Cup and the 2004 Jordan Super Cup.

In 2004, he moved back to Serbia where he was appointed the head coach of FK Vojvodina.

In 2005, he moved back to Jordan and his former club, Al-Faisaly SC. He again helped them secure the second position in the 2005–06 Jordan League and win the 2005 Jordan FA Cup.

In 2006, he moved to the North Africa and more accurately to Libya where he was appointed the head coach of Libyan Premier League club, Al-Ittihad Club. In his two-year spell with the Tripoli-based club, he helped them win the 2006–07 Libyan Premier League, 2006 Libyan Super Cup, 2007 Libyan Al-Fatih Cup, 2007–08 Libyan Premier League and the 2007 Libyan Super Cup. He also helped the club to reach the Semi-finals of the 2007 CAF Champions League which is till-date the best performance of the club in the competition.

In 2008, he was appointed the head coach of Libya national under-20 football team. During his one-year spell with the U20 national team, he helped them achieve the bronze medal in the 2009 Mediterranean Games. His team first topped the Group C with two draws against Montenegro U20 and with the help of a 4–2 penalty shootout win over the Europeans in the second match. In the semi-finals, they were defeated 1–0 by Italy U20 and in the third place match they won 8–7 on penalties against France U20 after the match had ended 0–0 at normal time.

After a successful stint with the Libya national U-20 team, he was appointed the head coach of the Libya national team on a three-year contract.

In October 2011, he was one of a number of managers the candidates for the vacant Rwanda national team manager role.

In 2012, he moved back to Jordan where he was appointed the head coach of Al-Wehdat SC, fierce rivals of his former club, Al-Faisaly SC. He helped the Amman New Camp-based club reach the quarter-finals of the 2012 AFC Cup. On 31 August 2012, he was sacked by the club after a 2–0 defeat against Al-Arabi (Irbid), the club's second defeat in the past three matches.

In 2013, he moved back to Libya and to his former club, Al-Ittihad on a one-year contract.

In 2014, he returned to Serbia where he was appointed the head coach of Serbian SuperLiga club FK Napredak Kruševac.

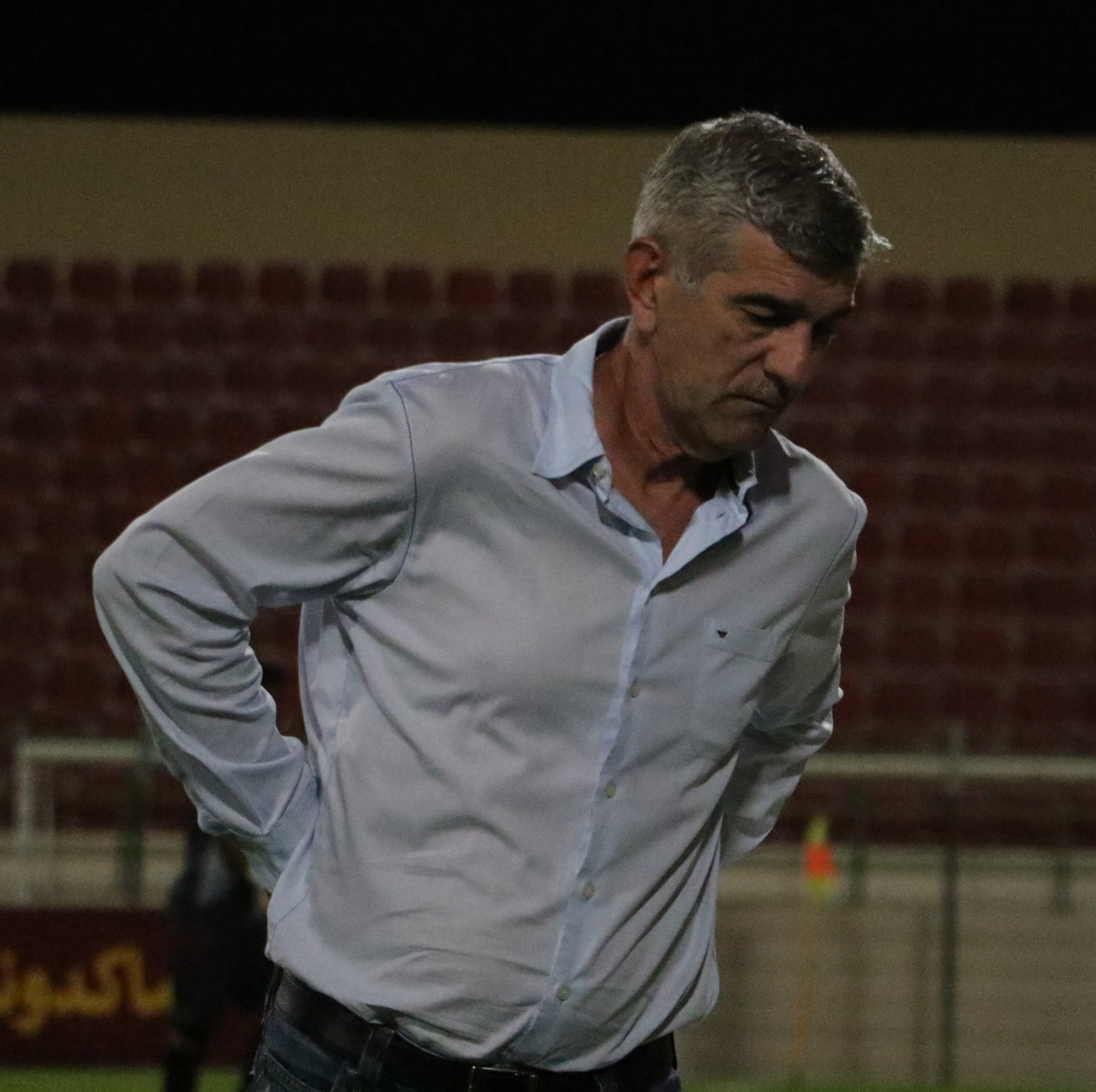
Smiljanić

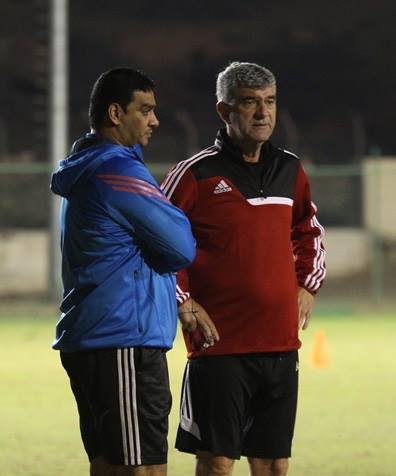
With assistant coach Yaqoob Ismail

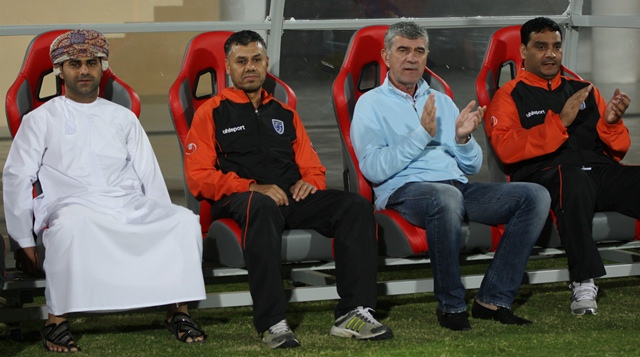
Saham SC technical staff in 2014–15

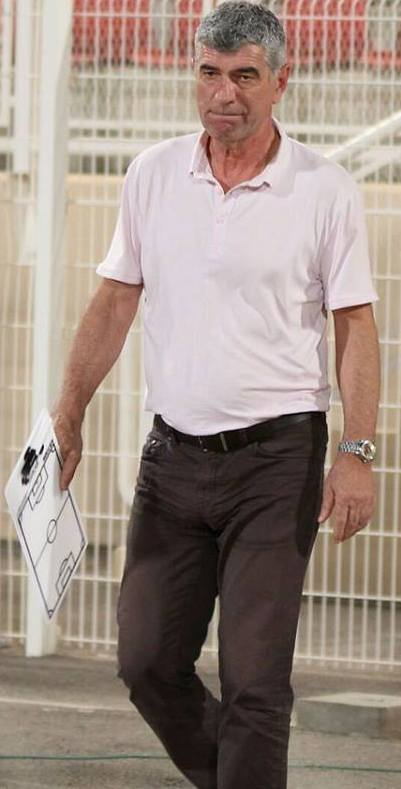
As Saham coach

On 20 November 2014, he arrived in Muscat, Oman and then moved to Saham where on 22 November 2014, he signed a six-month contract to be appointed the head coach of Saham Club of Oman Professional League.

In February 2016, he was appointed manager of Thai League 1 club BEC-Tero Sasana.

On 27 November 2016, he moved back to his former club, Al-Faisaly SC.

In 2017, he moved back to Montenegro where he was appointed the head coach of Mladost Podgorica.

On 9 November 2018, Smiljanić was named the head coach of Al Ahli SC (Tripoli). On 23 March 2018, he left the club by mutual consent.

== Personal life ==
His son, Milan Smiljanić is a professional footballer who has played for top European clubs like FK Partizan, RCD Espanyol, Sporting de Gijón, Gençlerbirliği S.K., Maccabi Netanya and FK Partizan. Branko is fluent in English, Serbian and Swedish.

== Honors ==
Borac Čačak

- Second League of FR Yugoslavia: 1998–99 (West)

Al-Faisaly

- Jordan League runners-up: 2003–04, 2005–06
- Jordan FA Cup: 2004, 2005
- Jordan Super Cup: 2004
- AFC Cup: 2005

Al-Ittihad (Tripoli)

- Libyan Premier League: 2006–07, 2007–08
- Libyan Cup: 2007
- Libyan Super Cup: 2006, 2007
- CAF Champions League semi-finals: 2007

Libya U-20

- Mediterranean Games third place: 2009
