= Ion Moldovan =

Romanian footballer (born 1954)

Personal information
- Full name: Ion Călin Moldovan
- Date of birth: 3 September 1954 (age 72)
- Place of birth: Constanţa, Romania
- Height: 1.78 m (5 ft 10 in)
- Position: Midfielder

Team information
- Current team: Voluntari (youth center manager)

Youth career
- FC Constanța

Senior career*
Years	Team	Apps	(Gls)
1974–1976	FC Constanța	31	(4)
1976–1979	Dinamo București	72	(6)
1979–1980	FC Constanța	?	(?)
1980–1981	Victoria București	?	(?)
1981–1984	FC Constanța	51	(4)
1984–1986	Victoria București	4	(1)
1986–1987	Flacăra Moreni	7	(0)
Total		165	(15)

International career
1975–1976	Romania U23	2	(0)

Managerial career
- 1986–1987: Delta Tulcea
- 1987–1990: Olimpia Râmnicu Sărat
- 1990–1992: Oțelul Galați
- 1992–1993: Romania U21
- 1993–1994: Argeş Piteşti
- 1994: Dinamo București
- 1995: UTA Arad
- 1995–1996: Al-Ittihad Tripoli
- 1996–1997: Argeş Piteşti
- 1998: Libya
- 1998: Politehnica Iaşi
- 1999: Al-Muharraq
- 1999–2002: Romania U21
- 2002: Dinamo București
- 2002–2004: Argeş Piteşti
- 2005: Juventus București
- 2005–2006: Al-Ittihad Tripoli
- 2006: Ceahlăul Piatra Neamț
- 2007: Dunărea Călăraşi
- 2007: Dacia Mioveni
- 2009: Astra Ploieşti
- 2010: Dinamo II București
- 2012–2013: Dinamo II București
- 2013–2014: Mioveni
- 2016: Dunărea Călărași (technical director)
- 2017: Concordia Chiajna (technical director)
- 2017–2018: Concordia Chiajna
- 2018–2022: Concordia Chiajna (technical director)
- 2023–: Voluntari (youth center manager)
- * Club domestic league appearances and goals

Ion Moldovan (born 3 September 1954) is a Romanian retired footballer who played as a midfielder. He is nicknamed "Comisarul".

== Honours ==
=== Player ===
Dinamo București

- Divizia A: 1976–77

Victoria București

- Divizia B: 1984–85

=== Coach ===
Olimpia Râmnicu Sărat

- Divizia C: 1988–89

Oțelul Galați

- Divizia B: 1990–91

Argeş Piteşti

- Divizia B: 1993–94

Al-Muharraq

- Bahraini Premier League: 1998–99

Al-Ittihad Tripoli

- Libyan Premier League: 2005–06
- Libyan SuperCup: 2005, 2006
