= 2004 Libyan Super Cup =

Al Olympic	Al-Ittihad
2	5
- Date: 27 August 2004
- Venue: 11 June Stadium, Tripoli
- Referee: Abdelhakeem Shelman

The 2004 Libyan Super Cup was the 8th edition of the Super Cup, and was played on Friday, August 27, 2004 between LPL winners Al Olympic and Libyan Cup winners Al Ittihad. Al Olympic ended the game with 9 men, Nader Kara and Younes Al Shibani having both been sent off, Kara going for taking his shirt off after scoring, and Al Shibani walking for a poor tackle. Al Ittihad comfortably won the game 5-2.

== Match details ==
August 27, 2004
18:00 EET

Al Olympic	2–5	Al Ittihad
Nader Kara 21', 68' (yellow card) 21' (yellow-red card) 68'; Younes al Shibani (red card) 33'		Abu Shah 41', 43'; Rahuma 74'; Osama al Hamadi 76'; Tarhouni 89'

11 June Stadium
Referee: Abdelhakeem Shelman (Libya)
