= Miodrag Ješić =

Serbian football manager and player (1958–2022)

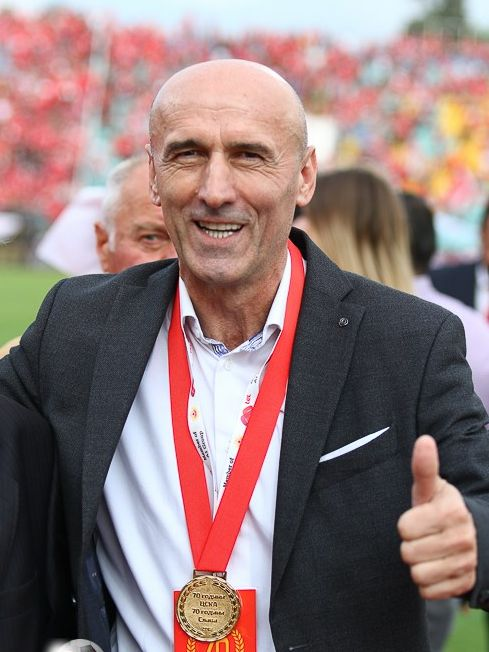
- Ješić in 2018

Personal information
- Full name: Miodrag Ješić
- Date of birth: 30 November 1958
- Place of birth: Osečenica, PR Serbia, FPR Yugoslavia
- Date of death: 8 December 2022 (aged 64)
- Place of death: Ruma, Serbia
- Positions: Sweeper; defensive midfielder

Youth career
- Žarkovo
- 1976–1977: Partizan

Senior career*
Years	Team	Apps	(Gls)
1977–1985	Partizan	144	(13)
1985–1989	Altay	136	(40)
1989–1990	Trabzonspor	32	(3)
1990	Partizan	4	(0)
1992–1993	Altay	18	(2)
Total		334	(58)

International career
1982–1984	Yugoslavia	8	(2)

Managerial career
- 1994: Obilić
- 1996–1997: Radnički Beograd
- 1997: Mladi Radnik
- 1998: Radnički Niš
- 1998–1999: OFK Beograd
- 1999–2000: Partizan
- 2000–2001: CS Sfaxien
- 2002: Radnički Beograd
- 2002: Altay
- 2002–2003: Slavia Sofia
- 2004: Pegah Gilan
- 2005–2006: CSKA Sofia
- 2006–2007: Partizan
- 2007: Shirin Faraz
- 2007–2008: Litex Lovech
- 2008: Otopeni
- 2008–2009: Budućnost Podgorica
- 2009–2010: Al-Ittihad Tripoli
- 2010: Changsha Ginde
- 2011: Al-Tahaddy
- 2011: Shahrdari Tabriz
- 2012–2013: Najran
- 2013: CSKA Sofia
- 2014: Litex Lovech
- 2015: Yangon United
- 2015–2016: Sarajevo
- 2016–2017: Al-Arabi
- 2017: Al-Ettifaq
- 2018: Khor Fakkan
- 2019: Ismaily
- 2021: Al-Ahly Benghazi
- 2022: Maziya
- 2022: Al-Shoulla
- * Club domestic league appearances and goals

Miodrag Ješić (Serbian Cyrillic: Миодраг Јешић; 30 November 1958 – 8 December 2022) was a Serbian football manager and player.

== Club career ==
After starting out at Žarkovo, Ješić was recruited by Vladica Kovačević to join Partizan in 1976. He was promoted to the first team by manager Ante Mladinić, but made his competitive debut under the guidance of Tomislav Kaloperović in the 1980–81 season. During his stint which lasted until 1985, Ješić amassed 144 appearances and scored 13 goals for Partizan in the Yugoslav First League, helping the club win the national championship in the 1982–83 season led by Miloš Milutinović. He also found the back of the net in a memorable 4–0 victory over English side Queens Park Rangers in the return leg of the 1984–85 UEFA Cup second round.

Subsequently, Ješić moved abroad to Turkey and signed with Altay on the invitation of his compatriot Kemal Omeragić. He was the team's top scorer in his first three seasons with the club. In total, Ješić collected 136 appearances and netted 40 goals for Altay in the top flight of Turkish football over his four seasons from 1985 to 1989.

Following a season-long spell with Trabzonspor, Ješić returned to his homeland and rejoined Partizan in the summer of 1990 on the recommendation of his former manager Miloš Milutinović. He saw limited playing time that year, before deciding to hang up his boots, aged 32. In November 1992, Ješić came out of retirement to rejoin Altay. He definitely retired from playing when his second spell with the club ended in November 1993. During his time in Turkey, Ješić was given the nickname "The Butcher" due to his highly aggressive and physically uncompromising style of play.

== International career ==
At international level, Ješić was capped eight times for Yugoslavia between 1982 and 1984, scoring two goals. He played the full 90 minutes in a memorable 3–2 win over Bulgaria in December 1983 that qualified the nation for UEFA Euro 1984, but was omitted from the final squad for the tournament. His final cap came on 12 September 1984 in a heavy 6–1 friendly defeat to Scotland at Hampden Park.

== Managerial career ==
After hanging up his boots, Ješić returned to his homeland and started his managerial career at Obilić in 1994. He later took charge of newly relegated Second League club Radnički Beograd. In May 1997, with five games left in the season, Ješić resigned from his position after the club's president allegedly "proposed" him to draw with Dinamo Pančevo. He subsequently took over fellow Second League side Mladi Radnik, before making his First League debut as manager of Radnički Niš in April 1998. He served in the same role for OFK Beograd during the NATO bombing-suspended 1998–99 campaign.

In June 1999, Ješić was unveiled as new manager of Partizan, replacing recently departed Ljubiša Tumbaković. He guided the club to two convincing aggregate wins over Estonian champions Flora (10–1) and Croatian champions Rijeka (6–1) in the opening two qualifying rounds of the 1999–2000 UEFA Champions League, before losing 5–1 on aggregate to Russian powerhouse Spartak Moscow in the final qualifying round. After suffering an early exit from the national cup and finishing as runners-up in the league, Ješić was dismissed and replaced by his predecessor Ljubiša Tumbaković in May 2000.

During the summer of 2000, Ješić moved to Tunisia and agreed terms with CS Sfaxien. He won the 2000 Arab Club Champions Cup, but soon left his position due to a family tragedy and took a break away from football. After a comeback stint with Radnički Beograd in the Second League, Ješić was appointed as manager of his former club Altay in July 2002, but resigned the following month due to a lack of squad reinforcements for the new season. He subsequently took charge of Bulgarian side Slavia Sofia in December 2002, replacing compatriot Žarko Olarević. In August 2003, Ješić parted ways with them, having finished fourth in the league the previous campaign. He then went to Iran and spent some time with Pegah Gilan during 2004.

In February 2005, Ješić was appointed as manager of Bulgarian club CSKA Sofia, winning the league title at the end of that season. He managed the team to a 1–0 away win over Premier League side Liverpool in the return leg of the 2005–06 UEFA Champions League third qualifying round, but lost the tie 3–2 on aggregate. Subsequently, Ješić qualified them to the 2005–06 UEFA Cup group stage with two 1–0 wins over Bundesliga club Bayer Leverkusen in the first round. He was consequently named the Coach of the Year in Bulgaria for 2005. In April 2006, Ješić resigned from his position following a 1–0 home loss to arch-rivals Levski Sofia.

In May 2006, Ješić rejoined Partizan as manager on a three-year contract. He led the team to a 3–2 aggregate victory over Slovenian club Maribor in the 2006–07 UEFA Cup second qualifying round, followed by a 4–3 aggregate win over Dutch side Groningen in the first round to qualify for the group stage, but finished bottom of the table with just one point in four games. After a turbulent first half of the season, Ješić left the club by mutual consent in January 2007 and was replaced by Miroslav Đukić.

In November 2007, after being dismissed by Shirin Faraz, Ješić departed Iran and returned to Bulgaria, accepting an offer to manage Litex Lovech. He won the 2007–08 edition of the Bulgarian Cup with the club. In June 2008, Ješić moved to neighbouring Romania, becoming manager of Liga I newcomers Otopeni, spending less than two months in charge.

In September 2008, Ješić was unveiled as manager of Montenegrin champions Budućnost Podgorica. He guided them to a runner-up finish in the 2008–09 season. In June 2009, Ješić agreed terms with Libyan club Al-Ittihad Tripoli on a contract until June 2010. He won the 2009 Libyan Super Cup, as well as the 2009–10 Libyan Premier League title. In June 2010, Ješić was appointed as manager of Chinese Super League side Changsha Ginde in an attempt to save the club from relegation.

After his brief stint with Al-Tahaddy ended abruptly due to the civil war in Libya, Ješić became manager of Persian Gulf Cup club Shahrdari Tabriz in June 2011. He was relieved from his duties in December of that year due to poor results in the first half of the season. In May 2012, it was announced that Ješić would be taking the helm of Saudi Pro League side Najran. He was sacked and replaced with Khemais Labidi in January 2013. Less than a week later, Ješić was confirmed as manager of CSKA Sofia, returning for his second spell with the club. He was surprisingly dismissed after just two months, having won one of his two games in charge.

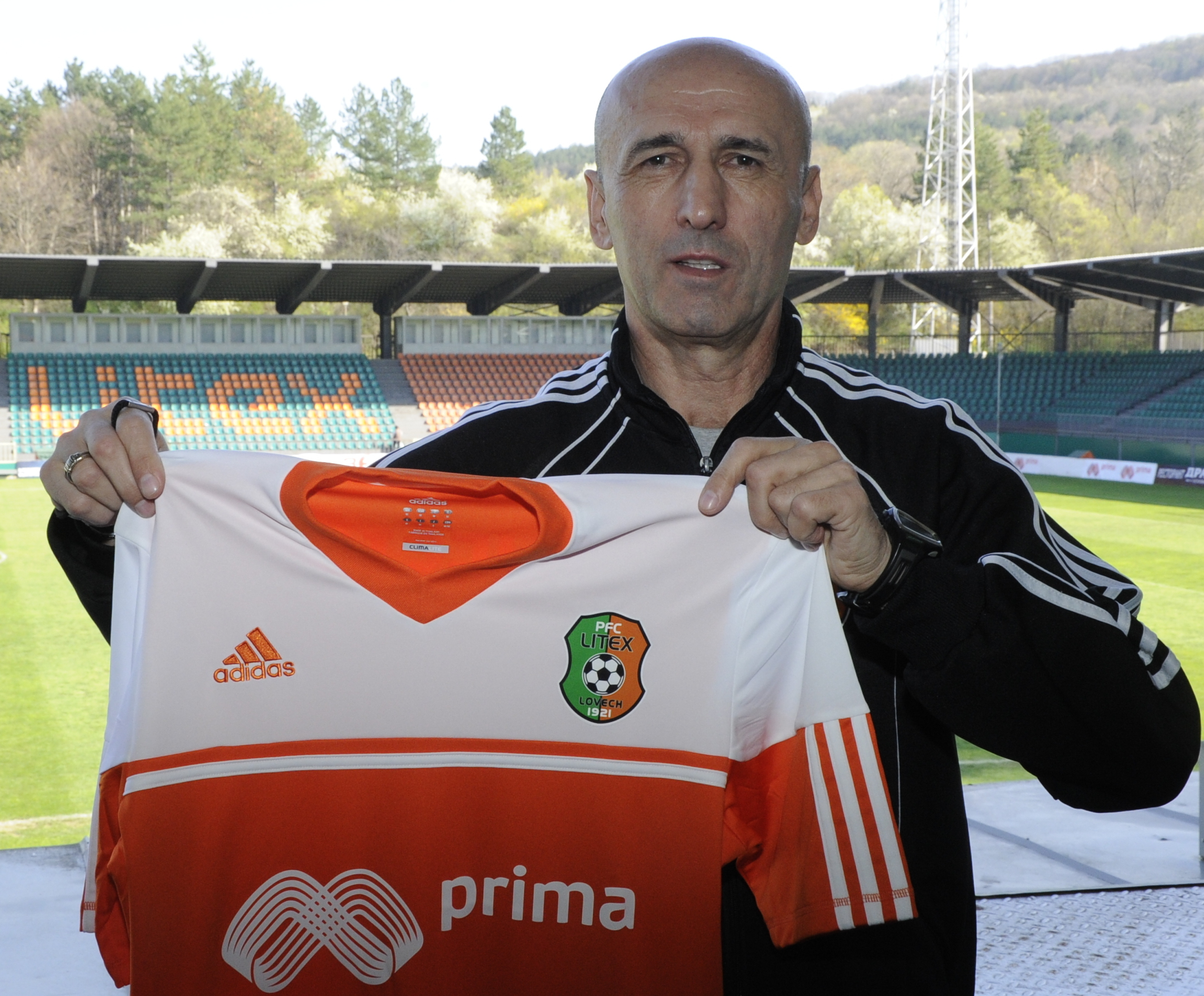
Ješić with Litex Lovech in 2014

In March 2014, Ješić returned to Litex Lovech and managed them until the end of the season. He was subsequently manager of Myanmar National League side Yangon United for the majority of the 2015 campaign. In September 2015, Ješić took over the helm of defending Bosnian champions Sarajevo. He left the club by mutual consent in March 2016 following the team's elimination from the national cup in the quarter-finals by Sloboda Tuzla. Between November 2016 and March 2017, Ješić served as manager of Kuwaiti club Al-Arabi.

In June 2017, Ješić was appointed as manager of Saudi Pro League club Al-Ettifaq. He was dismissed from his position in December and replaced by Saad Al-Shehri. In June 2018, Ješić agreed terms with UAE First Division League side Khor Fakkan. He was relieved from his duties in October following the team's poor performances in the 2018–19 UAE President's Cup preliminary round. In August 2019, Ješić was announced as new manager of Egyptian Premier League club Ismaily. He parted ways with them in early December after winning two and losing three out of their five matches at the start of the league campaign.

In July 2021, Ješić returned to Libya as manager of Al-Ahly Benghazi. He subsequently took charge of Maldivian champions Maziya in February 2022. After securing the Dhivehi Premier League title two games before the end of the season, Ješić mutually terminated his contract with the club in order to take over as manager of Saudi First Division League side Al-Shoulla in July 2022. He departed the club in September.

== Death ==
Ješić died in a car accident near the town of Ruma on 8 December 2022. He was buried next to his daughter Jelena, who died from complications following a car accident in December 2000 at the age of 18.

== Career statistics ==
=== Club ===
Appearances and goals by club, season and competition
Club	Season	League			Cup (Note: Includes Yugoslav Cup, Turkish Cup)		Continental		Total	
Club	Season	Division	Apps	Goals	Apps	Goals	Apps	Goals	Apps	Goals
Partizan	1980–81	Yugoslav First League	27	2	3	0	—		30	2
Partizan	1981–82	Yugoslav First League	26	3	1	0	—		27	3
Partizan	1982–83	Yugoslav First League	27	1	1	0	—		28	1
Partizan	1983–84	Yugoslav First League	32	4	1	0	4 (Note: Appearances in European Cup)	0	37	4
Partizan	1984–85	Yugoslav First League	32	3	3	0	5 (Note: Appearances in UEFA Cup)	1	40	4
Partizan	Total		144	13	9	0	9	1	162	14
Altay	1985–86	Turkish First League	36	11	6	3	—		42	14
Altay	1986–87	Turkish First League	32	10	2	0	—		34	10
Altay	1987–88	Turkish First League	36	12	4	1	—		40	13
Altay	1988–89	Turkish First League	32	7	2	1	—		34	8
Altay	Total		136	40	14	5	—		150	45
Trabzonspor	1989–90	Turkish First League	32	3	4	0	—		36	3
Partizan	1990–91	Yugoslav First League	4	0	2	0	2	0	8	0
Altay	1992–93	Turkish First League	12	2	1	0	—		13	2
Altay	1993–94	Turkish First League	6	0	0	0	—		6	0
Altay	Total		18	2	1	0	—		19	2
Career total			334	58	30	5	11	1	375	64

=== International ===
Appearances and goals by national team and year
National team	Year	Apps	Goals
Yugoslavia	1982	2	1
Yugoslavia	1983	5	1
Yugoslavia	1984	1	0
Total		8	2

=== Managerial ===
Managerial record by team and tenure
Team	From	To	Record				
Team	From	To	P	W	D	L	Win %
Radnički Niš	April 1998	May 1998	7	3	3	1	42.86
Partizan	June 1999	May 2000	50	37	6	7	74.00
Altay	July 2002	August 2002	0	0	0	0	—
Slavia Sofia	December 2002	August 2003	18	10	3	5	55.56
CSKA Sofia	February 2005	April 2006	51	37	5	9	72.55
Partizan	May 2006	January 2007	26	12	5	9	46.15
Litex Lovech	November 2007	May 2008	23	15	5	3	65.22
Otopeni	June 2008	August 2008	4	0	0	4	0.00
Budućnost Podgorica	September 2008	May 2009	34	22	8	4	64.71
Al-Tahaddy	February 2011	February 2011	0	0	0	0	—
CSKA Sofia	January 2013	March 2013	2	1	0	1	50.00
Litex Lovech	March 2014	May 2014	10	4	2	4	40.00
Sarajevo	September 2015	March 2016	16	9	2	5	56.25
Ismaily	August 2019	December 2019	5	2	0	3	40.00
Maziya	February 2022	July 2022	22	19	0	3	86.36
Total			268	171	39	58	63.81

== Honours ==
=== Player ===
Partizan

- Yugoslav First League: 1982–83

=== Manager ===
CS Sfaxien

- Arab Club Champions Cup: 2000

CSKA Sofia

- Bulgarian A Professional Football Group: 2004–05

Litex Lovech

- Bulgarian Cup: 2007–08

Al-Ittihad Tripoli

- Libyan Premier League: 2009–10
- Libyan Super Cup: 2009

Maziya

- Dhivehi Premier League: 2022

Individual

- Coach of the Year in Bulgaria: 2005
