= 2024–25 Al-Ahly Benghazi season =

Al-Ahly Benghazi
2024–25 season
- Chairman: Moataz Al-Ruqai
- Manager: Dejan Arsov (from 13 July to November); Momen Soliman (from 13 November)
- Stadium: Martyrs of February Stadium
- Libyan Premier League regular season: 2nd
- Libyan Premier League second stage: 1st
- Libyan Premier League Championship stage: 5th
- Libyan Cup: Runners-sup
- Libyan Super Cup: Runners-sup
- CAF Champions League: First round

The 2024–25 season was the 78th season in the history of Al-Ahly Benghazi Club, during which the club participated in the Libyan Premier League, the Libyan Cup, and the CAF Champions League.

== Transfers ==
=== In ===
Pos.	Player	Transferred from	Fee	Date	Source
MF	(Libya) Abdulmunem Okasha	(Libya) Abu Salim		25 July 2024	
FW	(Sudan) John Mano	(Sudan) Al-Hilal		25 July 2024	
GK	(Libya) Redwan Tawfiq	(Libya) Al-Ta'awon		28 July 2024	
FW	(Palestine) Zaid Qunbar	(Libya) Al-Ittihad Tripoli	Undisclosed	15 August 2024	
MF	(Sudan) Abuaagla Abdalla	(Sudan) Al-Hilal	Free	20 November 2024	

== Friendlies ==
=== Pre-season ===
3 October 2024 Friendly	Al-Shams (Egypt)	0–3	(Libya) Al-Ahly Benghazi	Egypt

8 October 2024 Friendly	Al Tarsana (Egypt)	1–0	(Libya) Al-Ahly Benghazi	Egypt

13 October 2024 Friendly	Haras El Hodoud (Egypt)	0–1	(Libya) Al-Ahly Benghazi	Egypt

19 October 2024 Friendly	Smouha (Egypt)	1–0	(Libya) Al-Ahly Benghazi	Cairo, Egypt

22 November 2024 Friendly	Al-Ahly Benghazi (Libya)	2–1	(Russia) Rocket Team	Benghazi
17:30 UTC+2

30 November 2024 Friendly	Diamond (Egypt)	1–2	(Libya) Al-Ahly Benghazi	Egypt

1 February 2025 Friendly	Al-Ahly Benghazi (Libya)	3–0	(Libya) Al Wefaq Ajdabiya

22 November 2025 Friendly	Al-Ahly Benghazi (Libya)	0–1	(Libya) Al Sadaqa	Benghazi
		Report		Stadium: Benina Martyrs Stadium

== Competitions ==
=== Overall record ===
Competition	First match	Last match	Starting round	Final position	Record							
Competition	First match	Last match	Starting round	Final position	Pld	W	D	L	GF	GA	GD	Win %
Libyan Premier League regular season	13 December 2024	7 April 2025	Matchday 1	2nd	14	11	1	2	31	6	+25	78.57
Libyan Premier League second stage	19 April 2025	23 June 2025	Matchday 1	1st	10	6	4	0	23	8	+15	60.00
Libyan Premier League championship stage	25 July 2025	10 August 2025	Matchday 1	5th	5	2	0	3	6	7	−1	40.00
Libyan Cup	11 April 2025	4 December 2025	Round of 32	Runners-sup	5	2	2	1	8	6	+2	40.00
Libyan Super Cup	8 December 2025		Final	Runners-sup	1	0	1	0	0	0	+0	0.00
CAF Champions League	18 August 2024	25 August 2024	First round	First round	2	0	1	1	1	2	−1	0.00
Total					37	21	9	7	69	29	+40	56.76

Source: Competitions

=== Libyan Premier League ===
==== Regular season ====
Pos	Team	Pld	W	D	L	GF	GA	GD	Pts	Promotion, qualification or relegation
1	Al-Hilal SCSC	14	11	1	2	30	12	+18	34	Qualification for the second round
2	Al-Ahli Benghazi	14	11	1	2	31	6	+25	34	Qualification for the second round
3	Al-Sadaqa	14	7	3	4	16	13	+3	24	Qualification for the second round
4	Al-Ta'awon	14	6	4	4	19	14	+5	22	
5	Al-Andalus	14	5	3	6	17	18	−1	18	

==== Matches ====
13 December 2024 1	Al-Ahly Benghazi	2–0	Al-Ta'awon	Benghazi
17:00 UTC+2	(penalty missed) 38'; 72'; 90+6'			Stadium: Martyrs of February Stadium

20 December 2024 2	Al-Ahly Benghazi	3–0	Al-Murooj	Benghazi
17:00 UTC+2				Stadium: Martyrs of February Stadium

26 December 2024 3	Al-Sadaqa	1–1	Al-Ahly Benghazi

31 December 2024 4	Al-Ahly Benghazi	5–0	Al-Mahdia

6 January 2025 5	Al-Ahly Benghazi	1–0	Al-Hilal Benghazi

16 January 2025 6	Al-Ahly Benghazi	4–0	Al-Branes

22 January 2025 8	Al-Andalus	1–2	Al-Ahly Benghazi

7 February 2025 10	Al-Ta'awon	1–0	Al-Ahly Benghazi

11 February 2025 11	Al-Murooj	1–4	Al-Ahly Benghazi

16 February 2025 12	Al-Ahly Benghazi	2–0	Al-Sadaqa

22 February 2025 11	Al-Mahdia	0–4	Al-Ahly Benghazi

27 February 2025 14	Al-Ahly Benghazi	1–2	Al-Hilal Benghazi

10 March 2025 13	Al-Branes	0–1	Al-Ahly Benghazi

7 April 2025 14	Al-Ahly Benghazi	1–0	Al-Andalus

==== Final stage ====
19 April 2025 1	Al-Akhdar	0–0	Al-Ahly Benghazi

23 April 2025 2	Al-Ahly Benghazi	1–1	Al-Hilal Benghazi

28 April 2025 3	Al-Sadaqa	1–3	Al-Ahly Benghazi

3 May 2025 4	Al-Tahaddy	2–5	Al-Ahly Benghazi

8 May 2025 5	Al-Ahly Benghazi	1–1	Al-Nasr

22 May 2025 6	Al-Nasr	0–3	Al-Ahly Benghazi

15 June 2025 8	Al-Hilal Benghazi	2–2	Al-Ahly Benghazi

19 June 2025 9	Al-Ahly Benghazi	3–0	Al-Sadaqa

23 June 2025 10	Al-Ahly Benghazi	3–0	Al-Tahaddy

==== Championship stage ====
25 July 2025 1	Al-Ahli Tripoli	2–0; Awarded	Al-Ahly Benghazi

29 July 2025 2	Al-Ahly Benghazi	1–2	Al-Hilal Benghazi

2 August 2025 3	Asswehly	0–2	Al-Ahly Benghazi

6 August 2025 4	Al-Akhdar	0–3	Al-Ahly Benghazi

10 August 2025 5	Al-Ahly Benghazi	0–3	Al-Ittihad Tripoli

=== Libyan Cup ===
11 April 2025 Round of 32	Al-Ahly Benghazi	3–0	Al-Andalus

13 May 2025 Round of 16	Al-Sadaqa	0–2	Al-Ahly Benghazi

4 July 2025 Quarter-finals	Al-Hilal Benghazi	1–1 (2–4 p)	Al-Ahly Benghazi

11 November 2025 Semi-finals	Al-Akhdar	2–2 (1–3 p)	Al-Ahly Benghazi

4 December 2025 Final	Al-Ahly Benghazi	0–3	Al-Ahli Tripoli

=== Libyan Super Cup ===
8 December 2025 Final	Al-Ahly Tripoli	0–0 (4–3 p)	Al-Ahly Benghazi	Cairo, Egypt
17:00				Stadium: Cairo International Stadium; Attendance: 0 Referee: Mahmoud Bassiouni

=== CAF Champions League ===
==== First round ====
18 August 2024 First leg	Al-Ahly Benghazi (Libya)	0–1	(Sudan) Al-Hilal	Benghazi
			Jean Claude Girumugisha 70'	Stadium: Martyrs of February Stadium

25 August 2024 Second leg	Al-Hilal (Sudan)	1–1 (2–1 agg.)	(Libya) Al-Ahly Benghazi	Juba, South Sudan
16:00	Khedr 84'		Mano 14'	Stadium: Juba Stadium
Note: The match was played on a neutral ground due to the war in Sudan.
