= 1998 Arab Club Champions Cup =

بطولة الأندية العربية لأبطال الدوري 1998

Tournament details
- Host country: Saudi Arabia
- City: Jeddah
- Dates: 19–30 November
- Teams: 8 (from 2 confederations) (from 7 associations)
- Venue: 1 (in 1 host city)

Final positions
- Champions: (Algeria) WA Tlemcen (1st title)
- Runners-up: (Saudi Arabia) Al Shabab

Tournament statistics
- Matches played: 15
- Goals scored: 43 (2.87 per match)
- Top scorer(s): (Algeria) Aissa Aidara (5 goals) (Saudi Arabia) Hamzah Idris (5 goals)
- Best player: (Saudi Arabia) Abdullah Al-Sheehan
- Best goalkeeper: (Algeria) Hichem Mezaïr

The 1998 Arab Club Champions Cup was played in Saudi Arabia in the city of Jeddah. WA Tlemcen won the championship for the first time beating in the final Al Shabab.

== Participants ==
Participants
Zone	Team	Qualifying method
	(Saudi Arabia) Al-Ittihad	Hosts
	(Tunisia) Club Africain	Holders
Zone 1	(Bahrain) West Riffa SC	1996–97 Bahraini Premier League winners
Zone 1	Al-Arabi (Kuwait City)	1996–97 Kuwaiti Premier League winners
Zone 1	(Oman) Sur SC	1996–97 Omani League runners-up
Zone 1	(Qatar) Al-Arabi (Doha)	1996–97 Qatar Stars League winners
Zone 1	(Saudi Arabia) Al-Hilal	1996–97 Saudi Premier League 3rd
Zone 1	(United Arab Emirates) Al-Wasl	1996–97 UAE Football League winners
Zone 2	(Egypt) Al Ahly	1996–97 Egyptian Premier League winners
Zone 2	(Saudi Arabia) Al Shabab	1996–97 Saudi Premier League 4th
Zone 2	(Sudan) Al-Merrikh	1996–97 Sudan Premier League winners
Zone 2	(Yemen) Al-Wehda	1996–97 Yemeni League winners
Zone 3	(Algeria) WA Tlemcen	1996–97 Algerian Championnat National 5th
Zone 3	(Libya) Al Tahaddy	1996–97 Libyan Premier League winners
Zone 3	(Tunisia) CA Bizertin	1996–97 Tunisian Championnat National 4th
Zone 4	(Jordan) Al-Wehdat	1996–97 Jordan League winners
Zone 4	(Lebanon) withdrew	Lebanese League representative
Zone 4	(Palestine) withdrew	West Bank or Gaza Strip League representative
Zone 4	(Syria) Tishreen	1996–97 Syrian League winners

== Preliminary round ==
=== Zone 1 (Gulf Area) ===
Qualification from GCC Champions League held in Muscat in February 1998.

Team	Pld	W	D	L	GF	GA	GD	Pts
(Saudi Arabia) Al-Hilal	5	3	2	0	12	6	+6	11
(Bahrain) West Riffa SC	5	2	2	1	6	7	−1	8
(United Arab Emirates) Al-Wasl	5	1	3	1	6	6	0	6
(Oman) Sur SC	5	1	3	1	6	6	0	6
(Qatar) Al-Arabi (Doha)	5	0	3	2	5	7	−2	3
Al-Arabi (Kuwait City)	5	0	3	2	3	6	−3	3

5 February 1998

Sur SC (Oman)	2–2	(Qatar) Al-Arabi (Doha)

Muscat
6 February 1998

West Riffa SC (Bahrain)	1–1	Al-Arabi (Kuwait City)

Muscat
6 February 1998

Al-Wasl (United Arab Emirates)	1–1	(Saudi Arabia) Al-Hilal

Muscat

8 February 1998

Sur SC (Oman)	1–0	Al-Arabi (Kuwait City)

Muscat
8 February 1998

Al-Hilal (Saudi Arabia)	2–1	(Qatar) Al-Arabi (Doha)

Muscat
9 February 1998

West Riffa SC (Bahrain)	2–1	(United Arab Emirates) Al-Wasl

Muscat

10 February 1998

Sur SC (Oman)	2–2	(Saudi Arabia) Al-Hilal

Muscat
11 February 1998

Al-Arabi (Kuwait City)	1–1	(United Arab Emirates) Al-Wasl

Muscat
11 February 1998

Al-Arabi (Doha) (Qatar)	1–1	(Bahrain) West Riffa SC

Muscat

13 February 1998

Al-Arabi (Doha) (Qatar)	0–0	Al-Arabi (Kuwait City)

Muscat
13 February 1998

Al-Hilal (Saudi Arabia)	4–1	(Bahrain) West Riffa SC

Muscat
14 February 1998

Sur SC (Oman)	1–1	(United Arab Emirates) Al-Wasl

Muscat

15 February 1998

Al-Hilal (Saudi Arabia)	3–1	Al-Arabi (Kuwait City)

Muscat
16 February 1998

Al-Wasl (United Arab Emirates)	2–1	(Qatar) Al-Arabi (Doha)

Muscat
16 February 1998

West Riffa SC (Bahrain)	1–0	(Oman) Sur SC

Muscat

Al-Hilal withdrew. West Riffa SC & Al-Wasl advanced to the final tournament.

=== Zone 2 (Red Sea) ===
Qualifying tournament held in Cairo. Al-Merrikh & Al-Wehda withdrew.

Team	Pld	W	D	L	GF	GA	GD	Pts
(Egypt) Al Ahly	2	2	0	0	4	1	+3	6
(Saudi Arabia) Al Shabab	2	0	0	2	1	4	−3	0
(Sudan) Al-Merrikh (W)	0	0	0	0	0	0	0	0
(Yemen) Al-Wehda (W)	0	0	0	0	0	0	0	0

(W) Withdrew

Al Ahly (Egypt)	3–1	(Saudi Arabia) Al Shabab

Cairo International Stadium, Cairo

Al Ahly (Egypt)	1–0	(Saudi Arabia) Al Shabab

Cairo International Stadium, Cairo

Al Ahly qualified but withdrew, Al Shabab replaced it and advanced to the final tournament.

=== Zone 3 (North Africa) ===
CA Bizertin withdrew.

WA Tlemcen & Al Tahaddy advanced automatically to the final tournament.

=== Zone 4 (East Region) ===
Tishreen, Lebanon & Palestine representative teams withdrew.

Al-Wehdat advanced automatically to the final tournament.

== Final tournament ==
=== Group stage ===
The eight teams were drawn into two groups of four. Each group was played on one leg basis. The winners and runners-up of each group advanced to the semi-finals.

==== Group A ====
Team	Pld	W	D	L	GF	GA	GD	Pts
(United Arab Emirates) Al-Wasl	3	2	1	0	6	1	+5	7
(Saudi Arabia) Al-Ittihad	3	2	0	1	9	2	+7	6
(Libya) Al Tahaddy	3	0	2	1	2	8	−6	2
(Jordan) Al-Wehdat	3	0	1	2	4	10	−6	1

19 November 1998

Al-Ittihad (Saudi Arabia)	0–1	(United Arab Emirates) Al-Wasl
		Ouédraogo (–)

Prince Abdullah al-Faisal Stadium, Jeddah
19 November 1998

Al-Wehdat (Jordan)	2–2	(Libya) Al Tahaddy

Prince Abdullah al-Faisal Stadium, Jeddah

21 November 1998

Al-Ittihad (Saudi Arabia)	3–1	(Jordan) Al-Wehdat

Prince Abdullah al-Faisal Stadium, Jeddah
21 November 1998

Al-Wasl (United Arab Emirates)	0–0	(Libya) Al Tahaddy

Prince Abdullah al-Faisal Stadium, Jeddah

24 November 1998

Al-Ittihad (Saudi Arabia)	6–0	(Libya) Al Tahaddy

Prince Abdullah al-Faisal Stadium, Jeddah
24 November 1998

Al-Wasl (United Arab Emirates)	5–1	(Jordan) Al-Wehdat

Prince Abdullah al-Faisal Stadium, Jeddah

==== Group B ====
Team	Pld	W	D	L	GF	GA	GD	Pts
(Saudi Arabia) Al Shabab	3	1	2	0	3	2	+1	5
(Algeria) WA Tlemcen	3	1	2	0	3	2	+1	5
(Bahrain) West Riffa SC	3	1	0	2	5	4	+1	3
(Tunisia) Club Africain	3	0	2	1	2	5	−3	2

20 November 1998

WA Tlemcen (Algeria)	0–0	(Saudi Arabia) Al Shabab

Prince Abdullah al-Faisal Stadium, Jeddah
20 November 1998

Club Africain (Tunisia)	0–3	(Bahrain) West Riffa SC

Prince Abdullah al-Faisal Stadium, Jeddah

22 November 1998

Al Shabab (Saudi Arabia)	2–1	(Bahrain) West Riffa SC

Prince Abdullah al-Faisal Stadium, Jeddah
22 November 1998

WA Tlemcen (Algeria)	1–1	(Tunisia) Club Africain
Kendouci 39'		Belhassen Aloui 75'

Prince Abdullah al-Faisal Stadium, Jeddah

25 November 1998

Club Africain (Tunisia)	1–1	(Saudi Arabia) Al Shabab

Prince Abdullah al-Faisal Stadium, Jeddah
25 November 1998

WA Tlemcen (Algeria)	2–1	(Bahrain) West Riffa SC
Tarek Bettadj 18'; Aissa Aidara 35'

Prince Abdullah al-Faisal Stadium, Jeddah

=== Knockout stage ===
Semi-finals
27 November – Jeddah
(United Arab Emirates) Al-Wasl	1
(Algeria) WA Tlemcen	3
27 November – Jeddah
(Saudi Arabia) Al Shabab	1
(Saudi Arabia) Al-Ittihad	0

Final
30 November – Jeddah
(Algeria) WA Tlemcen	3
(Saudi Arabia) Al Shabab	1

==== Semi-finals ====
27 November 1998

Al-Wasl (United Arab Emirates)	1–3	(Algeria) WA Tlemcen
Abdellah Hambes 28'		Mohamed Djalti 18' (pen.); Aissa Aidara 58', 72'

Prince Abdullah al-Faisal Stadium, Jeddah

27 November 1998

Al Shabab (Saudi Arabia)	1–0	(Saudi Arabia) Al-Ittihad
Alesandro (–)

Prince Abdullah al-Faisal Stadium, Jeddah

==== Final ====
30 November 1998

WA Tlemcen (Algeria)	3–1	(Saudi Arabia) Al Shabab
Aidara 33', 90'; Brahimi 42'		Al-Dawod 64'

Prince Abdullah al-Faisal Stadium, Jeddah
Referee: Gamal Al-Ghandour (Egypt)

== Winners ==
1998 Arab Club Champions Cup
(Algeria)
WA Tlemcen
First title

== Statistics ==
=== Goalscorers ===
Rank	Player	Team	Goals
1	(Senegal) Aissa Aidara	(Algeria) WA Tlemcen	5
1	(Saudi Arabia) Hamzah Idris	(Saudi Arabia) Al Shabab	5

=== Awards ===
Highest Scorer

- (Saudi Arabia) Hamzah Idris

Man of the Competition

- (Saudi Arabia) Abdullah Al-Sheehan

Best Goalkeeper

- (Algeria) Hichem Mezaïr

Fair Play team of the tournament

- Al Shabab
