= 1999 Libyan Super Cup =

Al Mahallah	Al Ittihad
0	0
- After extra time Al Ittihad won 11–10 on penalties
- Date: 16 January 2000
- Venue: 23 October Stadium, Khoms

The 1999 Libyan Super Cup was a one-legged Libyan football championship contested between LPL winners Al Mahalah and Libyan Cup winners Al Ittihad. This was the third edition of the Super Cup, and the second in its one-legged form. The match was actually played in January 2000 at the 23 October Stadium in Khoms.

The match ended 0-0 after extra time, with Al Ittihad winning a long penalty shootout 12–11, and winning their first Super Cup title.

== Match details ==
16 January 2000
18:00 EET

Al Mahallah	0–0	Al Ittihad
Penalties
	12–11

23 October Stadium
