= 2007 Libyan Al-Fatih Cup final =

Association football championship in Libya

The 2007 Al Fatih Cup final was played on July 15, 2007 between Al Akhdar and Al Ittihad. This was Al Ittihad's 9th final, of which they had won four and lost 5, and Al Akhdar's 3rd. The game was a repeat of the 2005 final, when Al Ittihad comfortably won 3-0. Both sides had performed well in the league, Al Ittihad winning the title, and Al Akhdar coming 4th. Al Akhdar were guaranteed a place in the 2008 CAF Confederation Cup, as Al Ittihad had already qualified for the African Champions League as a result of winning the title. The game was close, but Al Ittihad won 1-0, thanks to a 53rd-minute goal from Burkinabé striker Pierre Koulibaly.

== Match details ==
July 15, 2007
19:30

Al Ittihad	1 – 0	Al Akhdar
Koulibaly 52'

11 June Stadium
Attendance: 80,000
Referee: 'Awaaz Trabelsi (Tunisia)
