= 1997 Libyan Super Cup =

Al Tahaddy	Al Nasr
1	0

First leg
Al Tahaddy	Al Nasr
1	0
- Date: 24 October 1997
- Venue: 28 March Stadium, Benghazi
- Referee: Mohammed Abdallah

Second leg
Al Nasr	Al Tahaddy
0	0
- Date: 27 October 1997
- Venue: 28 March Stadium, Benghazi

The 1997 Libyan Super Cup was a two-legged football match that took place between Friday, October 24, 1997, and Monday, October 27 between LPL winners Al Tahaddy and Libyan Al Fatah Cup winners Al Nasr. This was the first edition of the competition, and as this was an all-Benghazi final, both legs were played at the March 28 Stadium, consequently the home stadium of both sides.

Al Tahaddy won the match 1–0 over the two legs, and claimed the first Super Cup title.

== First leg ==
24 October 1997
18:00 EET

Al Tahaddy	1–0	Al Nasr

28 March Stadium
Referee: (Libya) Mohammed Abdallah

== Second leg ==
27 October 1997
18:00 EET

Al Nasr	0–0	Al Tahaddy

28 March Stadium
