= 2006 Libyan Super Cup =

African football competition

Al Ittihad	Al Ahly Tripoli
1	0
- Date: 17 January 2007
- Venue: 11 June Stadium, Tripoli
- Referee: Pavel Olsiak (Slovakia)

The 2006 Libyan SuperCup took place between 2005-06 Libyan Premier League champions Al Ittihad and 2005-06 Libyan Cup winners Al Ahly Tripoli.

This was the 10th edition of the competition, and it resulted in Al Ittihad's 5th consecutive victory, after they won 1–0 over their arch rivals.

== Match details ==
January 17, 2007
15:00 EET

Al Ittihad	1 – 0	Al Ahly Tripoli
Younes Al Shibani 19'		Mounir al Mabrouk (red card) 65'

11 June Stadium
Referee: (Slovakia) Pavel Olsiak
