= 2000 Libyan Super Cup =

Al Ahly Tripoli	Al Swihli
2	0
- Al Ahly were awarded a 2–0 win due to Al Swihli not showing up for the match.
- Date: 31 December 2000
- Venue: Rajab Omar Stadium, Tripoli

The 2000 Libyan Super Cup was the fourth edition of the Super Cup, and was meant to be played on December 31, 2000, between LPL winners Al Ahly Tripoli and Libyan Cup runners-up Al Swihli at the Rajab Omar Stadium in Tripoli. This was a repeat of the Libyan Cup final that was played in the same year.

Al Swihli did not show for the cup final and once again, the match was not played as Al Swihli did not show, and Al Ahly Tripoli were therefore awarded a 2–0 victory. Al Swihli later apologised for not showing.
