= 2009 Libyan Super Cup =

Ittihad	Tersanah
3	2
- Date: 22 September 2009
- Venue: 11 June Stadium, Tripoli
- Referee: Jamaal Ambaya

The 2009 Libyan Super Cup was the 13th edition of the competition. This year's edition was a repeat of the Libyan Cup final of the previous season, which saw Ittihad Tripoli beat Tersanah on penalties. The match took place on September 22, 2009. Ittihad won their seventh consecutive Super Cup title 3-2, stretching back to 2002. It was played at the 11 June Stadium.

== Match details ==
22 September 2009
18:30 EET

Ittihad	3 – 2	Tersanah
Jeri Eimére 4'; Pierre Koulibaly 38'; Ahmed Zuway 76'	(Report) (in Arabic)	Ahmed Krewa'a 34', 46'

11 June Stadium, Tripoli
Attendance: 30,000
Referee: (Libya) Jamaal Ambaya
