= 2005 Libyan Super Cup =

Football competition

2004 Libyan Super Cup
Al-Ittihad	Al Akhdar
1	0
- Date: 18 September 2005
- Venue: 11 June Stadium, Tripoli
- Referee: Waheed Saleh

The 2005 Libyan SuperCup took place between 2004-05 Libyan Premier League champions Al Ittihad and 2004-05 Libyan Cup runners-up Al Akhdar (as Al Ittihad had already won the Libyan Cup, Al Akhdar took their place in the final as runners-up).

The match finished 1-0 to Al Ittihad. This was their 5th consecutive victory in the 9th edition of the Super Cup.

== Match details ==
September 18, 2005
20:00 EET

Al Ittihad	1 – 0	Al Akhdar
Nabeel al Muftaah 43' (pen.)

11 June Stadium
Referee: (Libya) Waheed Saleh
