= Al Tahaddy SC =

Libyan football club

Al-Tahadi
- Full name: Al-Tahadi Sporting Club
- Founded: 26 October 1954
- Ground: Benina Martyrs Stadium
- Capacity: 10,550
- League: Libyan Premier League
- 2024–25: Libyan Premier League – Eastern Group, 6th of 6
- Website: al-tahadi.ly
Home colours	Away colours

Al-Tahadi Sporting Club (Arabic: نادي التحدي الرياضي, lit. 'The Challenge') is a Libyan football club based in Benghazi. The club competes in the Libyan Premier League. Their home ground is Martyrs of February Stadium.

Founded in 1954, the club won the Libyan Premier League three times, lastly in the 1996–97 season. They also won the Libyan Super Cup in 1997.

== Honours ==
- Libyan Premier League: 3

1966–68, 1976–77, 1996–97

- Libyan Super Cup: 1

1997

== Performance in CAF competitions ==
- African Cup of Champions Clubs: 2

1969: First Round
1978: Second Round

- CAF Cup: 1

2002: First Round

== Managerial history ==
- (Serbia) Miodrag Ješić (February 2011 – February 2011)
- (Tunisia) Hatem Missaoui (October 2022 – January 2023)
- (Egypt) Emad El Nahhas (December 2023 – March 2024)
