= 1996–97 Libyan Premier League =

Libyan Premier League
- Season: 1996–97

The 1996–97 Libyan Premier League was the 30th edition of the competition since its inception in 1963. The league featured 25 teams, split into two groups, one of 13 and another of 12. The top team in each of these groups went into a one-off playoff match to decide the championship.

Tahaddy won the league, defeating Mahalla 2–0 to secure their third title. They have not won the league since.

== League table ==
=== Group A ===
Pos	Team	Pld	W	D	L	GF	GA	GD	Pts
1	Mahalla (A)	22	14	4	4	39	20	+19	46
2	Hilal	22	12	7	3	35	16	+19	43
3	Ta'awon	22	12	6	4	27	17	+10	42
4	Nasr	22	8	6	8	20	20	0	30
5	Dhahra Tripoli	22	7	8	7	26	20	+6	29
6	Intilaaq	22	7	8	7	25	25	0	29
7	Sharrara	22	7	8	7	22	28	−6	29
8	Afriqi	22	6	7	9	24	28	−4	25
9	Tersanah	22	4	12	6	14	18	−4	24
10	Najma	22	6	6	10	19	24	−5	24
11	Suqoor	22	6	6	10	17	28	−11	24
12	Rafiq Sorman	22	1	6	15	12	39	−27	9

Source: Mushwar.com (in Arabic)
Rules for classification: 1) points; 2) goal difference; 3) number of goals scored.
(A) Advance to a further round

=== Group B ===
Pos	Team	Pld	W	D	L	GF	GA	GD	Pts
1	Tahaddy (A)	24	12	8	4	39	20	+19	44
2	Majd	24	11	9	4	31	11	+20	42
3	Ahly Benghazi	24	10	10	4	30	20	+10	40
4	Sweahly	24	9	9	6	25	19	+6	36
5	Yarmouk	24	8	10	6	20	20	0	34
6	Madina	24	9	6	9	20	19	+1	33
7	Olomby	24	7	12	5	24	21	+3	33
8	Qurthabia	24	8	6	10	28	34	−6	30
9	Saddaqa	24	6	10	8	17	24	−7	28
10	Murooj	24	5	11	8	14	24	−10	26
11	Darnes	24	4	11	9	15	24	−9	23
12	Shat	24	5	7	12	13	22	−9	22
13	Ittihad Gheryan	24	6	3	15	24	34	−10	21

Source: Mushwar.com (in Arabic)
Rules for classification: 1) points; 2) goal difference; 3) number of goals scored.
(A) Advance to a further round

== Playoff ==
Played on August 8, 1997, at 28 March Stadium, Benghazi
Tahaddy 2–0 Mahalla
