= Younes Al Shibani =

Libyan footballer (born 1981)

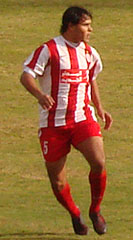

Personal information
- Full name: Younes Al Hussein Al Shibani
- Date of birth: June 27, 1981 (age 45)
- Place of birth: Misrata, Libya
- Height: 1.80 m (5 ft 11 in)
- Position: Centre back

Team information
- Current team: Ismaily

Senior career*
Years	Team	Apps	(Gls)
2003–2004	Asswehly	16	(2)
2004–2006	Olympic Azzaweya	?	(?)
2006–2011	Al-Ittihad	78	(18)
2011–2012	Olympique Khouribga	9	(0)
2012	Ismaily		
2013–2014	Al-Ittihad		

International career^{‡}
2003–2013	Libya	52	(2)
Medal record
Men's football
Representing Libya
Arab Cup
Runner-up	2012 Saudi Arabia
- * Club domestic league appearances and goals ‡ National team caps and goals as of 18 November 2013

Younes Al Hussein Al Shibani (Arabic: يُونُس الْحُسَيْن الشَّيْبَانِيّ) (born June 27, 1981) is a Libyan footballer who plays as a defender for the Egyptian Premier League side Ismaily. He is a member of the Libya national team.

== Club career ==
For the 2012/13 season, he plays for Ismaily, club from Egypt.

== International career ==
Younes debuted for Libya in 2003, and still plays for national team.

== Honours ==
Libya

- Arab Cup: runner-up, 2012
