= Osama Al Hamadi =

Libyan footballer (born 1975)

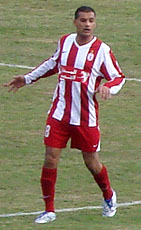
- Al Hamadi in 2007

Personal information
- Full name: Osama Musbah Al Hamadi
- Date of birth: June 7, 1975 (age 51)
- Place of birth: Tripoli, Libya
- Height: 1.79 m (5 ft 10 in)
- Position: Defender

Senior career*
Years	Team	Apps	(Gls)
2004–2010	Al-Ittihad (LBY)	201	(7)

International career
2001–2009	Libya	32	(0)
- * Club domestic league appearances and goals

Osama Al Hamadi (Arabic: اسامه الحمادي) (born June 7, 1975) is a former Libyan football defender. He was a member of the Libya national football team.

Al Hamadi featured for Libya at the 2009 African Championship of Nations.
