= Al Ahli SC (Tripoli) =

Libyan football club

Al-Ahli Sports Club
- Full name: Al-Ahli Sports Club Tripoli النادي الأهلي الرياضي
- Nicknames: Bianco verde Club of the Century
- Founded: 19 September 1950; 76 years ago
- Ground: Tripoli Stadium
- Capacity: 50,000
- Chairman: Mohamed Al-Mashay
- Manager: (Egypt) Hossam El Badry
- League: Libyan Premier League
- 2026/27: Still Playing In The League.
Home colours	Away colours	Third colours

Al-Ahli Sports Club Tripoli (English: National Sports Club ; Arabic: النادي الأهلي الرياضي), also known as Al-Ahli Tripoli, is a Libyan professional football club based in Tripoli. having won 14 Libyan Premier League titles, 9 Libyan Cups and 3 Libyan Super Cups.

The club's crest consists of a green and white background, with a torch placed on an outline of Libya. The torch is meant to signify independence for the nation, as it was achieved just months after the club was founded. The club's crest changed after it won its 10th Libyan Premier League title in 2000, with a star being placed on top. In the year 2000 Al Ahli Tripoli were involved in one of the world's most confusing seasons as they won the league title twice in one season. The club won the first national championship in the 1967–68 season, but then suffered a period of seven years until its next win in 1970–71. The club won two of the next three titles, and picked up the last before the cancellation of the league in 1977–78. The 1980s were a very dire period for the club, as their own failure, this meant that their rivals went into the 1990s with six titles to their own five. However, they reached the final of the African Cup Winners' Cup in 1984, where they withdrew from facing Al-Ahly Cairo, as the bad Libyan relationship with Egypt at that time meant that Libyan clubs were banned from facing Egyptian clubs.

== Foundation ==
In the middle of the 20th century, Libya, a country still looking for its independence, started to found many sporting and youth clubs in a political move to unite the country and drive out the British forces. A group of youngsters from Tripoli decided to name their club Al Istiqlal, meaning Independence, but the British administration, uncomfortable with this name as it may have caused a revolt against their power, refused it. The club was therefore named Al-Ahl Tripoli, in literal translation it means "Family", but it is also understood as The People's, meaning it's a club for the people. The club's colours is green to signify independence, peace and hope for the country. The club was founded on 19 September 1951.

=== First ever squad ===
- Amir Al Mujraab
- Mabrouk Al Misraty
- Ahmed Al Taweel
- Hassan Mohamed Al Amir
- Mahmoud Abu Hadima
- Mohamed Al Houny
- Mohamed Al Yumni
- Salem Bin Hussein
- Mustafa Al Khouga
- Al-hadi Al Khadaar
- Mustafa Al Raqea'y
- Mohamed Al Sadiq Abu Raqiqa
- Ali Al Jundi
- Abdesalam Bizaan
- Ibrahim Kafaalah
- Yousef Bin Abdallah Al Fazzani
- Ali Al Jdeady
- Manager: Othman Bizaan

== Honours ==
- Libyan Premier League: 14
  - Champions 1963–64, 1970–71, 1972–73, 1973–74, 1977–78, 1983–84, 1992–93, 1993–94, 1994–95, 2000, 2013–14, 2015–16, 2022–23, 2024–25
  - First official tournament in the Libyan Premier League season 1963–64 winners
  - First cup in the Libyan Premier League Season 1976
  - The first team in Libya to get the Gold Star (10 Championships)
- Libyan Cup: 9
  - Winners 1976, 1994, 2000, 2001, 2006, 2016, 2023,2025,2026
  - First Team in Libya to win the Libyan Cup
  - Never lost any final in the Libyan Cup
- Libyan Super Cup: 3
  - Winners 2000, 2017, 2025
  - Runners Up 2001,2006,2024

== Participation in African competitions ==
=== CAF Champions League ===
Season	Round reached	Opponent
2000 CAF Champions League	Round of 32	(Ivory Coast) Africa Sports
2001 CAF Champions League	Round of 32	(Algeria) CR Belouizdad
2009 CAF Champions League	Second round	(Tunisia) Étoile Sportive du Sahel
2015 CAF Champions League	Preliminary round	(Egypt) Smouha SC
2016 CAF Champions League	Second round	(Ivory Coast) ASEC Mimosas
2017 CAF Champions League	Quarter-finals	(Tunisia) Étoile Sportive du Sahel
2022–23 CAF Champions League	Second round	(Sudan) Al-Merrikh SC
2023–24 CAF Champions League	First round	(Mauritania) FC Nouadhibou
2025–26 CAF Champions League	Second round	(Morocco) RS Berkane

=== African Cup of Champions Clubs ===
Season	Round reached	Opponent
1972 African Cup of Champions Clubs	Quarter-finals	(Uganda) Simba FC
1974 African Cup of Champions Clubs	First round	(Sudan) Al-Hilal
1979 African Cup of Champions Clubs	First round	(Algeria) MC Alger
1983 African Cup of Champions Clubs	First round	(Algeria) JS Kabylie

=== African Cup Winners' Cup ===
Season	Round reached	Opponent
1984 African Cup Winners' Cup	Semi-finals (withdrew before the final)	Withdrew before the final
2002 African Cup Winners' Cup	Second round	(Egypt) Ghazl El Mahalla SC

=== CAF Confederation Cup ===
Season	Round reached	Opponent
2007 CAF Confederation Cup	Preliminary round	(Chad) CotonTchad SC
2010 CAF Confederation Cup	Round of 32	(Tunisia) CS Sfaxien
2014 CAF Confederation Cup	Preliminary round	(Mali) CO Bamako
2016 CAF Confederation Cup	Group stage	Fourth place
2018–19 CAF Confederation Cup	Round of 32	(Cameroon) New Star de Douala
2020–21 CAF Confederation Cup	First round	(Tunisia) US Monastir
2021–22 CAF Confederation Cup	Semi-finals	(South Africa) Orlando Pirates F.C.
2022–23 CAF Confederation Cup	Qualifying round for the group stage	(South Africa) Marumo Gallants F.C.
2024–25 CAF Confederation Cup	Second round	(Tanzania) Simba S.C.
2026–27 CAF Confederation Cup	Group stage	

== Sponsorship ==
=== Official Sponsor ===
- Libyana and Eni are the official Sponsors for Al-Ahli
- US Steel GT is the current Sponsors for Al-Ahli

=== Kit providers ===
- Former kit providers of Al Ahli were Adidas and Diadora.
- Current kit provider is Adidas.

== Players ==
Libyan teams are limited to three players without North African citizenship.

=== Current squad ===
As of 9 September, 2026

Note: Flags indicate national team as defined under FIFA eligibility rules; some limited exceptions apply. Players may hold more than one non-FIFA nationality.

No.	Pos.	Nation	Player
1	GK	LBA	Ayman Al-Tihar (3rd captain)
2	DF	GHA	Issahaku Yakubu
3	DF	ALG	Hocine Dehiri
4	DF	LBA	Abdelaziz Al-Suwaii
5	DF	LBA	Abdullah Al-Houti
6	MF	SEN	Mamadou Lamine Camara
7	FW	LBA	Muaid Ellafi (vice-captain)
8	MF	LBA	Motasem Al-Musrati
9	FW	COD	Fiston Mayele
10	FW	LBA	Hamdou Elhouni (captain)
11	MF	LBA	Tarek Beshara
12	GK	LBA	Moad Allafi
13	GK	LBA	Nadheer Al Gandoz
14	FW	LBA	Ezoo El Mariamy
15	DF	LBA	Mohamed Al-Ajnaf
16	MF	LBA	Bashir Al-Hibeeshi

No.	Pos.	Nation	Player
17	FW	BDI	Jean Claude Girumugisha
18	DF	LBA	Ahmed El Trbi
19	DF	LBA	Mohamed El-Munir
20	MF	LBA	Omran Salem
21	DF	ALG	Mohamed Amine Tougai
22	DF	LBA	Ahmed Al-Harram
23	DF	EGY	Mostafa Shakshak
24	DF	LBA	Mohamed Khalil
25	MF	BFA	Blati Touré
26	MF	LBA	Abouqassim Rajab
27	FW	LBA	Majdi Ben Hayla
28	MF	LBA	Faraj Ghidan
29	FW	RSA	Fagrie Lakay
30	MF	LBA	Anis Mekraz
32	DF	LBA	Abdallah Al Seddik
33	MF	LBA	Omar El-Harek
34	FW	LBA	Jaafar Aboltiefa

== Managers ==
- (Netherlands) Piet Hamberg (2000)
- (Germany) Theo Bücker (2007–08)
- (Ukraine) Yuriy Sevastyanenko (2008)
- (Algeria) Noureddine Saâdi (2008–09)
- (Egypt) Hossam El-Badry (2013)
- (Egypt) Talaat Youssef (2014)
- (Netherlands) Ruud Krol (2014)
- (Libya) Jamal Abu Nawara (2016)
- (Egypt) Tarek El-Ashry (2016)
- (Egypt) Talaat Youssef (2017)
- (Libya) Reda Atia (2018)
- (Tunisia) Tariq Thabit (2019)
- (Egypt) Talaat Youssef (2021)
- (France) Bernard Simondi (2021–22)
- (Tunisia) Fathi Jabal (2022)
- (Tunisia) Tarek Jaraea (2023-2024)
- (France) Didier Gomes Da Rosa (2024)
- (Egypt) Hossam El-Badry (2025-)
