= Libyan Super Cup =

Libyan football championship

The Libyan Super Cup is a Libyan football championship contested between the winners of the Libyan Premier League and the Alfatih Cup. The game is played at the beginning of the following season, and signals the beginning of the domestic year. The Super Cup was a two-legged final in 1997 but became one-legged from 1998 onwards. Al Ittihad are the most successful club with Eleven titles in total, including 10 consecutive titles from 2002 onwards.

== Winners ==
Year	Winner	Score	Runner-up
1997 (two-legged)	Tahaddy	1–0, 0–0	Nasr
1998	Mahalla	3–1	Shat
1999	Ittihad	0–0 (11–10 penalty)	Mahalla
2000	Ahly Tripoli	2–0	Sweahly
2001	Madina	2–1	Ahly Tripoli
2002	Ittihad	1–0	Hilal
2003	Ittihad	3–0	Nasr
2004	Ittihad	5–2	Olomby
2005	Ittihad	1–0	Akhdar
2006	Ittihad	1–0	Ahly Tripoli
2007	Ittihad	3–1 (aet)	Akhdar
2008	Ittihad	4–0	Khaleej Sirte
2009	Ittihad	3–2	Tersanah
2010	Ittihad	3–0	Nasr
2011–2016	Did not take place		
2017	Ahly Tripoli	3–0 (awd.)	Hilal
2021	Al-Nasr SC	1-0	Ittihad
2024	Ittihad	1-1; Won 6–5 on penalties.	Ahly Tripoli
2025	Ahly Tripoli	0-0 won 4-3 on penalties.	Ahly Benghazi
