= Al-Ittihad SC (Tripoli) =

Association football club in Libya

Al-Ittihad SCSC
- Full name: Al-Ittihad Sport, Cultural & Social Club
- Founded: 29 July 1944; 82 years ago
- Ground: Tripoli Stadium
- Capacity: 50,000
- Chairman: Muhammad Ismail
- Manager: Faouzi Benzarti
- League: Libyan Premier League
Home colours	Away colours

Al-Ittihad SCSC (Arabic: نادي الاتحاد الرياضي) is a professional football club based in Bab Ben Gashier, Tripoli, Libya. They have won the Libyan Premier League 18 times, the Libyan Cup 7 times and the Libyan SuperCup 11 times. Al-ittihad reached the semi-finals of the CAF Confederation Cup in 2010, CAF Champions League in 2007 and CAF Cup Winners Cups in 2001

== History ==
Al-Ittihad Club was founded on July 29, 1944, after a merger between three clubs, "Al Ummal", "Al Nahda" & "Al Shabab". Mohamed Al-Krewi (Arabic: محمد الكريو) was the founder and first president.

== Honours ==
=== Libyan Championships ===
- Libyan Premier League: 18
  - 1964–65, 1965–66, 1968–69, 1985–86, 1987–88, 1988–89, 1989–90, 1990–91, 2001–02, 2002–03, 2004–05, 2005–06, 2006–07, 2007–08, 2008–09, 2009–10, 2020–21, 2021–2022
- Libyan Cup: 7
  - 1992, 1999, 2004, 2005, 2007, 2009, 2018
  - Finalist: 1994, 1987, 2002, 2003
- Libyan SuperCup: 11
  - 1999, 2002, 2003, 2004, 2005, 2006, 2007, 2008, 2009, 2010, 2022, 2024
  - Runners Up 2021

== Performance in CAF competitions ==
- CAF Champions League / African Cup of Champions Clubs: 15 appearances

The club have 5 appearances in African Cup of Champions Clubs from 1967 to 1992 and 10 appearances in CAF Champions League from 2003 till now.

1967 – Quarter-finals
1985 – First round
1990 – First round
1991 – First round
1992 – First round

2003 – Second round
2004 – Preliminary round
2006 – Preliminary round
2007 – Semi-finals (third place)
2008 – Second round

2009 – First round
2010 – Second round
2011 – Second round
2013 – Preliminary round
2021–22 – First round

- CAF Confederation Cup: 11 appearances

2005 – Second round
2008 – Play-off round
2010 – Semi-finals (third place)
2011 – Play-off round

2015 – First round
2016 – First round
2018 – First round
2018–19 – First round

2019–20 – First round
2020–21 – First round
2021–22 – Quarter-finals

- CAF Cup Winners' Cup: 1 appearance

2000 – Semi-finals (third place)

== Stadium ==
Al-Ittihad play their home games at the Tripoli Stadium, 6 km from center of Tripoli. They share the 45,000-capacity ground with Al-Ahly Tripoli and Al Madina. The club owns the 5,000 capacity Al Mala'b Al Baladi (Arabic: الملعب البلدي). Located in central Tripoli, the ground is now used for training. Al-Ittihad SCSC usually play their home games in front of thousands of spectators.

== Current squad ==
As of 2 March 2026

Note: Flags indicate national team as defined under FIFA eligibility rules; some limited exceptions apply. Players may hold more than one non-FIFA nationality.

No.	Pos.	Nation	Player
1	GK	LBA	Mohamed Darebi
2	DF	LBA	Husain Badi
3	DF	LBA	Subhi Al-Dhawi
5	DF	LBA	Motasem Sabbou
6	MF	TOG	Roger Aholou
7	MF	LBA	Ahmad Benali
8	MF	LBA	Mahmoud Al-Shalui
9	FW	CMR	Anatole Abang
10	FW	MAR	Nawfel Zerhouni
11	FW	RSA	Thembinkosi Lorch
12	GK	LBA	Moad Allafi
13	DF	LBA	Talal Farhat (captain)
14	DF	LBA	Tahir Bin Amir
15	FW	LBA	Al-Sanousi Al-Hadi

No.	Pos.	Nation	Player
18	MF	LBA	Anas Al-Shibli
19	FW	LBA	Mouad Eissa
20	FW	LBA	Ahmed Al-Bizi
21	GK	LBA	Ahmed Abi Lashhar
22	MF	BFA	Stephane Aziz Ki
23	FW	LBA	Yousef Karah
24	DF	LBA	Mohammed Al-Shiteewi
25	MF	LBA	Mohammed Al-Zentani
27	MF	NGR	Clement Ikenna
28	DF	ALG	Adem Alilet
29	FW	LBA	Abdulmuyassir Boushibar
30	FW	LBA	Al-Sanousi Al-Hadi
31	FW	LBA	Mutassim Garfa

=== Out on loan ===
Note: Flags indicate national team as defined under FIFA eligibility rules; some limited exceptions apply. Players may hold more than one non-FIFA nationality.

No.	Pos.	Nation	Player
—	DF	BOT	Thatayaone Ditlhokwe (at Al Shomooa until 30 June 2026)

== Managers ==
- (Romania) Ion Moldovan (1995–96)
- (Ukraine) Semen Osynovskyi (Aug 1998 – Nov 1998)
- (Italy) Giuseppe Dossena (2002–03)
- (Romania) Ion Moldovan (2005–06)
- (Serbia) Branko Smiljanić (July 2006 – June 8)
- (Italy) Stefano Cusin (Dec 2008 – June 9)
- (Serbia) Miodrag Ješić (July 2009 – May 10)
- (Egypt) Anwar Salama (May 2010 – Oct 10)
- (Brazil) Baltemar Brito (2010–11)
- (Brazil) Marcos Paquetá (2011–12)
- (Portugal) José Vidigal (2012–13)
- (Brazil) Baltemar Brito (2013–14)
- (Libya) Osama Al Hamadi (2020–21)
- (Italy) Giuseppe Sannino (2021)
- (Libya) Osama Al Hamadi (2021–22)
- (Montenegro) Milija Savović 2022–23)
- (Egypt) Moamen Soliman (2023–24)
- (Libya) Jamal Khamis (2024–?)
- (South Africa) Rhulani Mokwena (March 2026 – July 2026)

== Other sports ==
Al Ittihad has got teams competing in other sports.
