= 2015 Africa Cup of Nations qualification =

Tournament details
- Dates: 12 April – 19 November 2014
- Teams: 51 (from 1 confederation)

Tournament statistics
- Matches played: 125
- Goals scored: 268 (2.14 per match)
- Top scorer(s): (Burkina Faso) Jonathan Pitroipa (6 goals)

The 2015 Africa Cup of Nations qualification matches determined the participating teams for the 2015 Africa Cup of Nations.

A total of 16 teams competed in the 2015 Africa Cup of Nations.

Prior to November 2014, it was expected that Morocco would be the host country (and thus be pre-qualified). However, as Morocco missed the 9 November deadline for confirming their willingness to host (because of the Ebola virus epidemic in West Africa), Morocco was expelled from the tournament. Equatorial Guinea was chosen as the new host, and despite having played in the qualifiers and been disqualified due to fielding an ineligible player, they now qualified for the tournament automatically by virtue of being the hosts.

== Qualified teams ==
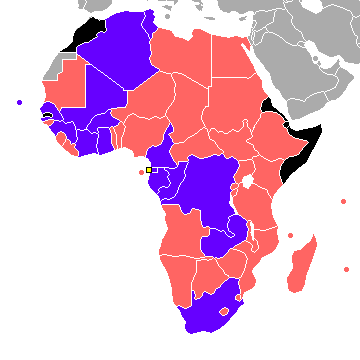
Qualified Failed to qualify Withdrew, disqualified or did not enter Not part of CAF

Team	Method of qualification	Date of qualification	Finals appearance	Last appearance	Previous best performance	FIFA ranking at start of event
Equatorial Guinea	Hosts	14 November 2014	2nd	2012	Quarter-finals (2012)	
Cape Verde	Group F winners	15 October 2014	2nd	2013	Quarter-finals (2013)	
Algeria	Group B winners	15 October 2014	15th	2013	Winners (1990)	
Tunisia	Group G winners	14 November 2014	17th	2013	Winners (2004)	
South Africa	Group A winners	15 November 2014	9th	2013	Winners (1996)	
Zambia	Group F runners-up	15 November 2014	17th	2013	Winners (2012)	
Cameroon	Group D winners	15 November 2014	17th	2010	Winners (1984, 1988, 2000, 2002)	
Gabon	Group C winners	15 November 2014	5th	2012	Quarter-finals (1996, 2012)	
Burkina Faso	Group C runners-up	15 November 2014	9th	2013	Runners-up (2013)	
Senegal	Group G runners-up	15 November 2014	13th	2012	Runners-up (2002)	
Ivory Coast	Group D runners-up	19 November 2014	20th	2013	Winners (1992)	
Ghana	Group E winners	19 November 2014	19th	2013	Winners (1963, 1965, 1978, 1982)	
Guinea	Group E runners-up	19 November 2014	11th	2012	Runners-up (1976)	
Mali	Group B runners-up	19 November 2014	8th	2013	Runners-up (1972)	
Congo	Group A runners-up	19 November 2014	7th	2000	Winners (1972)	
DR Congo	Best 3rd place	19 November 2014	17th	2013	Winners (1968, 1974)	

== Format ==
The qualifying draw was supposed to take place in Morocco on 10 March 2013 during CAF General Assembly. However, the CAF Executive Committee decided on 8 March 2013 that the qualifying draw would be held on 31 January 2014 in South Africa in line with the 2014 African Nations Championship. However, on 28 January 2014, the draw date was reported to have changed once again. The qualifying draw was held on 27 April 2014 in Cairo, Egypt (with the exception of the preliminary round which was held on 21 February 2014 in Cairo).

A total of 51 teams entered the qualification matches (Djibouti and Somalia did not enter). After the CAF Executive Committee meeting on 24 January 2014, it was decided that the qualifiers shall be played in the format of several qualifying rounds, as well as a group stage with seven groups consisting of four teams each. The two top teams of each group then directly qualify for the finals, along with the best third place team of the seven groups. This was different from the original proposal, which consisted of a preliminary round followed by a group stage with twelve groups of four teams.

The top 21 teams listed in the CAF Ranking shall automatically qualify for the group stage. The seven other teams playing in the group stage shall be determined following the conclusion of the qualifying rounds. The ranking is computed using the teams' results in the 2013 Africa Cup of Nations finals (weighted by 3) and qualifiers, the 2012 Africa Cup of Nations finals (weighted by 2) and qualifiers (weighted by 0.5), the 2010 Africa Cup of Nations finals, and the 2014 FIFA World Cup qualifiers. If tied on points, the tiebreaker is decided by the results of the latest editions of the Africa Cup of Nations.

Below are the ranking of the 51 teams that entered the qualification matches:

Bye to group stage	Competing in qualifying rounds	
Bye to group stage	Entering in first round	Entering in preliminary round
1. Nigeria (39.5 pts); 2. Ghana (38 pts); 3. Ivory Coast (36 pts); 4. Zambia (33 pts); 5. Burkina Faso (32 pts); 6. Mali (30 pts); 7. Tunisia (22.5 pts); 8. Algeria (18 pts); 9. Angola (17 pts); 10. Cape Verde (16.5 pts); 11. Togo (14.5 pts); 12. Egypt (14.5 pts); 13. South Africa (13.5 pts); 14. Cameroon (13.5 pts); 15. DR Congo (12 pts); 16. Ethiopia (12 pts); 17. Gabon (12 pts); 18. Niger (11 pts); 19. Guinea (11 pts); 20. Senegal (11 pts); 21. Sudan (10.5 pts)	22. Libya (10.5 pts); 23. Equatorial Guinea (9 pts); 24. Botswana (8 pts); 25. Malawi (7 pts); 26. Uganda (6.5 pts); 27. Mozambique (6 pts); 28. Benin (5.5 pts); 29. Sierra Leone (5 pts); 30. Congo (5 pts); 31. Central African Republic (4.5 pts); 32. Zimbabwe (4 pts); 33. Kenya (4 pts); 34. Liberia (3.5 pts); 35. Gambia (3.5 pts); 36. Rwanda (3.5 pts); 37. Tanzania (3.5 pts); 38. Namibia (3 pts); 39. Burundi (2 pts); 40. Lesotho (2 pts); 41. Guinea-Bissau (1.5 pts); 42. Madagascar (1.5 pts); 43. Chad (1 pt); 44. São Tomé and Príncipe (1 pt); 45. Seychelles (1 pts); 46. Comoros (0.5 pts); 47. Swaziland (0.5 pts)	48. Mauritius (0.5 pts); 49. Eritrea (0 pts); 50. Mauritania (0 pts); 51. South Sudan (0 pts)

== Schedule ==
The schedule of the competition was as follows.

Round	Matchday	Date
Qualifying rounds	Preliminary round 1st leg	11–13 April 2014
Qualifying rounds	Preliminary round 2nd leg	18–20 April 2014
Qualifying rounds	First round 1st leg	16–18 May 2014
Qualifying rounds	First round 2nd leg	30 May–1 June 2014
Qualifying rounds	Second round 1st leg	18–20 July 2014
Qualifying rounds	Second round 2nd leg	1–3 August 2014
Group stage	Matchday 1	5–6 September 2014
Group stage	Matchday 2	10 September 2014
Group stage	Matchday 3	10–11 October 2014
Group stage	Matchday 4	15 October 2014
Group stage	Matchday 5	14–15 November 2014
Group stage	Matchday 6	19 November 2014

== Qualifying rounds ==
In each of the qualifying rounds, teams were drawn into knock-out ties. Qualification ties were played on a home-and-away two-legged basis. If the sides were level on aggregate after the second leg, the away goals rule was applied, and if still level, the tie proceeded directly to a penalty shoot-out (no extra time was played).

=== Preliminary round ===
The draw for the preliminary round was held at the CAF Executive Committee on 21 February 2014 at Cairo, Egypt. The four teams ranked 48–51 played in this round.

On 30 March 2014, Eritrea withdrew from the preliminary round of the 2015 Africa Cup of Nations qualifiers, likely due to a rising number of the Eritrean national team players defecting from Eritrea during away matches.

Team 1	Agg.	Team 2	1st leg	2nd leg
Mauritania	3–0	Mauritius	1–0	2–0
Eritrea	w/o	South Sudan	—	—

12 April 2014
17:00 UTC±0

Mauritania	1–0	Mauritius
Ba 23'	Report

Stade Olympique, Nouakchott
Referee: Maguette N'Diaye (Senegal)
20 April 2014
15:30 UTC+4

Mauritius	0–2	Mauritania
	Report	Sow 38'; Bessam 90'

Stade George V, Curepipe
Referee: Samuel Chirindza (Mozambique)

Mauritania won 3–0 on aggregate and advanced to the first round.

11 April 2014

Eritrea	Cancelled	South Sudan
	Report

Cicero Stadium, Asmara
Referee: Davies Omweno (Kenya)
19 April 2014

South Sudan	Cancelled	Eritrea
	Report

Khartoum Stadium, Khartoum (Sudan) (Note: South Sudan played their home matches outside of the country due to security concerns stemming from the South Sudanese Civil War.)
Referee: Thierry Nkurunziza (Burundi)

South Sudan advanced to the first round after Eritrea, who have a history of their players defecting whilst on international duty, withdrew.

=== First round ===
The draw for the first round was held on 27 April 2014 at Cairo, Egypt. The 26 teams ranked 22–47 and the two winners of the preliminary round played in this round. Teams ranked 22–35 were seeded, and teams ranked 36–47 and the two winners of the preliminary round were unseeded.

Team 1	Agg.	Team 2	1st leg	2nd leg
Liberia	1–2	Lesotho	1–0	0–2
Kenya	2–1	Comoros	1–0	1–1
Madagascar	2–2 (a)	Uganda	2–1	0–1
Mauritania	awd.	Equatorial Guinea	1–0	0–3
Namibia	1–3	Congo	1–0	0–3
Libya	0–3	Rwanda	0–0	0–3
Burundi	0–1	Botswana	0–0	0–1
Central African Republic	1–3	Guinea-Bissau	0–0	1–3
Swaziland	1–2	Sierra Leone	1–1	0–1
Gambia	awd.	Seychelles	—	—
São Tomé and Príncipe	0–4	Benin	0–2	0–2
Malawi	3–3 (a)	Chad	2–0	1–3
Tanzania	3–2	Zimbabwe	1–0	2–2
Mozambique	5–0	South Sudan	5–0	0–0

18 May 2014
16:00 UTC±0

Liberia	1–0	Lesotho
Laffor 40'	Report

Antoinette Tubman Stadium, Monrovia
Referee: Gustave Tohouegnon (Benin)
1 June 2014
15:00 UTC+2

Lesotho	2–0	Liberia
Potloane 2'; Jetoh 5' (o.g.)	Report

Setsoto Stadium, Maseru
Referee: Joshua Amao (Nigeria)

Lesotho won 2–1 on aggregate and advanced to the second round.

18 May 2014
16:00 UTC+3

Kenya	1–0	Comoros
Omolo 34'	Report

Nyayo National Stadium, Nairobi
Referee: Wellington Kaoma (Zambia)
30 May 2014
15:00 UTC+3

Comoros	1–1	Kenya
Saandi 78'	Report	Masika 56'

Stade Said Mohamed Cheikh, Mitsamiouli
Referee: Djamal Aden (Djibouti)

Kenya won 2–1 on aggregate and advanced to the second round.

18 May 2014
15:00 UTC+3

Madagascar	2–1	Uganda
Andriatsima 9' (pen.); Andriamatsinoro 24'	Report	Kiiza 90+4' (pen.)

Rabemananjara Stadium, Mahajanga
Referee: Victor Gomes (South Africa)
31 May 2014
16:00 UTC+3

Uganda	1–0	Madagascar
Massa 12'	Report

Mandela National Stadium, Kampala
Referee: Mohamed Farouk Mahmoud (Egypt)

2–2 on aggregate. Uganda won on the away goals rule and advanced to the second round.

17 May 2014
17:00 UTC±0

Mauritania	1–0	Equatorial Guinea
Diakité 76'	Report

Stade Olympique, Nouakchott
Referee: Mutaz Khairalla (Sudan)
1 June 2014
17:00 UTC+1

Equatorial Guinea	3–0	Mauritania
Mina 2'; Rivas 71'; Dio 74'	Report

Estadio de Malabo, Malabo
Referee: Davies Omweno (Kenya)

Equatorial Guinea won 3–1 on aggregate. However, on 3 July 2014, the CAF announced that Equatorial Guinea were disqualified for fielding the ineligible player Thierry Fidjeu in the tie, and as a result, Mauritania advanced to the second round. Equatorial Guinea later qualified for the final tournament as replacement hosts.

17 May 2014
16:00 UTC+1

Namibia	1–0	Congo
Bester 87'	Report

Sam Nujoma Stadium, Windhoek
Referee: Hagi Wiish (Somalia)
1 June 2014
15:30 UTC+1

Congo	3–0	Namibia
Ganvoula 43'; Doré 46'; Douniama 66'	Report

Stade Municipal, Pointe-Noire
Referee: Tessema Bamlak (Ethiopia)

Congo won 3–1 on aggregate and advanced to the second round.

18 May 2014
16:00 UTC+1

Libya	0–0	Rwanda
	Report

Stade Olympique de Radès, Radès (Tunisia) (Note: Libya played their home matches outside of the country due to security concerns.)
Referee: Juste Ephrem Zio (Burkina Faso)
31 May 2014
15:30 UTC+2

Rwanda	3–0	Libya
Birori 38', 62', 72'	Report

Stade Régional Nyamirambo, Kigali
Referee: Joshua Bondo (Botswana)

Rwanda won 3–0 on aggregate and advanced to the second round.

18 May 2014
15:30 UTC+2

Burundi	0–0	Botswana
	Report

Prince Louis Rwagasore Stadium, Bujumbura
Referee: Mohamed Said Kordi (Tunisia)
1 June 2014
15:30 UTC+2

Botswana	1–0	Burundi
Mogorosi 57'	Report

Lobatse Stadium, Lobatse
Referee: Eric Otogo-Castane (Gabon)

Botswana won 1–0 on aggregate and advanced to the second round.

18 May 2014
15:00 UTC+1

Central African Republic	0–0	Guinea-Bissau
	Report

Stade Alphonse Massemba-Débat, Brazzaville (Congo) (Note: Central African Republic played their home matches outside of the country due to security concerns.)
Referee: Antonio Muachihuissa Caxala (Angola)
31 May 2014
16:30 UTC±0

Guinea-Bissau	3–1	Central African Republic
Cícero 2', 39'; Kassaï 15' (o.g.)	Report	Kéthévoama 46'

Estádio 24 de Setembro, Bissau
Referee: Denis Dembélé (Ivory Coast)

Guinea-Bissau won 3–1 on aggregate and advanced to the second round.

18 May 2014
15:00 UTC+2

Swaziland	1–1	Sierra Leone
Shongwe 56'	Report	Sesay-Fullah 2'

Somhlolo National Stadium, Lobamba
Referee: Sebit Rassas Librato (South Sudan)
31 May 2014
16:30 UTC±0

Sierra Leone	1–0	Swaziland
U. Bangura 66' (pen.)	Report

National Stadium, Freetown
Referee: Mohamed Ragab Omar (Libya)

Sierra Leone won 2–1 on aggregate and advanced to the second round.

16–18 May 2014

Gambia	Cancelled	Seychelles
	Report

Independence Stadium, Bakau
30 May–1 June 2014

Seychelles	Cancelled	Gambia
	Report

Stade Linité, Victoria

Seychelles advanced to the second round after Gambia were suspended from all CAF competitions for two years for deliberately fielding overage players in the 2015 African U-20 Championship qualification match against Liberia.

17 May 2014
15:00 UTC±0

São Tomé and Príncipe	0–2	Benin
	Report	Sessègnon 82', 90' (pen.)

Estádio Nacional 12 de Julho, São Tomé
Referee: Mal Mohamadou (Cameroon)
1 June 2014
16:00 UTC+1

Benin	2–0	São Tomé and Príncipe
Gounongbé 27'; Sessègnon 73'	Report

Stade Charles de Gaulle, Porto-Novo
Referee: Sékou Ahmed Touré (Guinea)

Benin won 4–0 on aggregate and advanced to the second round.

17 May 2014
14:30 UTC+2

Malawi	2–0	Chad
Mhango 6', 74'	Report

Kamuzu Stadium, Blantyre
Referee: Rainhold Shikongo (Namibia)
31 May 2014
16:00 UTC+1

Chad	3–1	Malawi
N'Douassel 16', 36'; Ninga 18'	Report	Ngalande 62'

Stade Omnisports Idriss Mahamat Ouya, N'Djamena
Referee: Malang Diedhiou (Senegal)

3–3 on aggregate. Malawi won on the away goals rule and advanced to the second round.

18 May 2014
16:00 UTC+3

Tanzania	1–0	Zimbabwe
Bocco 13'	Report

Benjamin Mkapa National Stadium, Dar es Salaam
Referee: Joseph Lamptey (Ghana)
1 June 2014
15:00 UTC+2

Zimbabwe	2–2	Tanzania
Phiri 3'; Katsande 54'	Report	Haroub 22'; Ulimwengu 46'

National Sports Stadium, Harare
Referee: Bernard Camille (Seychelles)

Tanzania won 3–2 on aggregate and advanced to the second round.

18 May 2014
15:00 UTC+2

Mozambique	5–0	South Sudan
Josemar 12'; Mexer 42'; Sonito 45', 53'; Isac 82'	Report

Estádio do Zimpeto, Maputo
Referee: Denis Batte (Uganda)
30 May 2014
17:00 UTC+3

South Sudan	0–0	Mozambique
	Report

Khartoum Stadium, Khartoum (Sudan)
Referee: Thierry Nkurunziza (Burundi)

Mozambique won 5–0 on aggregate and advanced to the second round.

=== Second round ===
The draw for the second round was held on 27 April 2014 at Cairo, Egypt. The 14 winners of the first round played in this round.

Team 1	Agg.	Team 2	1st leg	2nd leg
Lesotho	1–0	Kenya	1–0	0–0
Uganda	3–0	Mauritania	2–0	1–0
Congo	awd.	Rwanda	2–0	0–2
Botswana	3–1	Guinea-Bissau	2–0	1–1
Sierra Leone	w/o	Seychelles	2–0	—
Benin	1–1 (3–4 p)	Malawi	1–0	0–1
Tanzania	3–4	Mozambique	2–2	1–2

20 July 2014
15:00 UTC+2

Lesotho	1–0	Kenya
Moletsane 66'	Report

Setsoto Stadium, Maseru
Referee: Samuel Chirindza (Mozambique)
3 August 2014
16:00 UTC+3

Kenya	0–0	Lesotho
	Report

Nyayo National Stadium, Nairobi
Referee: Aurélien Juenkou (Cameroon)

Lesotho won 1–0 on aggregate and advanced to Group C.

19 July 2014
17:00 UTC+3

Uganda	2–0	Mauritania
Majwega 48'; Massa 69'	Report

Mandela National Stadium, Kampala
Referee: Hudu Munyemana (Rwanda)
3 August 2014
17:00 UTC±0

Mauritania	0–1	Uganda
	Report	Ssentongo 89'

Stade Olympique, Nouakchott
Referee: Mehdi Abid Charef (Algeria)

Uganda won 3–0 on aggregate and advanced to Group E.

20 July 2014
15:30 UTC+1

Congo	2–0	Rwanda
Gandzé 66'; Doré 78'	Report

Stade Municipal, Pointe-Noire
Referee: Malang Diedhiou (Senegal)
2 August 2014
15:00 UTC+2

Rwanda	2–0	Congo
Ndahinduka 51'; Kagere 58'	Report
Penalties
Tubane (penalty scored); Mbaraga (penalty scored); Kagere (penalty missed); Bayisenge (penalty scored); Niyonzima (penalty missed); Sibomana (penalty scored)	4–3	(penalty missed) Doré; (penalty scored) N'Dinga; (penalty scored) Ganvoula; (penalty scored) Bifouma; (penalty missed) Lépicier; (penalty missed) Lakolo

Nyamirambo Regional Stadium, Kigali
Referee: Ali Adelaïd (Comoros)

2–2 on aggregate. Rwanda won the penalty shoot-out. However, on 17 August 2014, the CAF announced that Rwanda were disqualified for fielding the ineligible player Daddy Birori in the tie, as it emerged that Birori had been using a different name and a Congolese passport when playing for his club side, AS Vita. As a result, Congo advanced to Group A.

19 July 2014
15:00 UTC+2

Botswana	2–0	Guinea-Bissau
Tshireletso 29', 38'	Report

Botswana National Stadium, Gaborone
Referee: Victor Gomes (South Africa)
2 August 2014
16:00 UTC±0

Guinea-Bissau	1–1	Botswana
Seidi 17'	Report	Ramatlhakwane 80'

Estádio 24 de Setembro, Bissau
Referee: Kokou Fagla (Togo)

Botswana won 3–1 on aggregate and advanced to Group G.

19 July 2014
16:30 UTC±0

Sierra Leone	2–0	Seychelles
Jabbie 55'; U. Bangura 72' (pen.)	Report

National Stadium, Freetown
Referee: Bienvenu Sinko (Ivory Coast)
2 August 2014
16:30 UTC+4

Seychelles	Cancelled	Sierra Leone
	Report

Stade Linité, Victoria
Referee: Hagi Wiish (Somalia)

Sierra Leone advanced to Group D after Seychelles withdrew. Seychelles were forced to forfeit after the Sierra Leone team was barred by the Seychelles immigration authorities from entering the country to play the second leg for fears over the West African Ebola virus epidemic.

20 July 2014
16:00 UTC+1

Benin	1–0	Malawi
Sessègnon 19'	Report

Stade de l'Amitié, Cotonou
Referee: Youssef Essrayri (Tunisia)
2 August 2014
14:30 UTC+2

Malawi	1–0	Benin
Banda 13'	Report
Penalties
Kamwendo (penalty scored); Msowoya (penalty scored); Mzava (penalty scored); Malata (penalty scored)	4–3	(penalty missed) Sessègnon; (penalty scored) Mama; (penalty scored) Angan; (penalty scored) Barazé; (penalty missed) Adénon

Kamuzu Stadium, Blantyre
Referee: Janny Sikazwe (Zambia)

1–1 on aggregate. Malawi won the penalty shoot-out and advanced to Group B.

20 July 2014
16:00 UTC+3

Tanzania	2–2	Mozambique
Mcha 66', 72' (pen.)	Report	Domingues 48' (pen.); Isac 88'

Benjamin Mkapa National Stadium, Dar es Salaam
Referee: Mahmoud Ashour (Egypt)
3 August 2014
15:00 UTC+2

Mozambique	2–1	Tanzania
Josemar 45+1'; Domingues 81'	Report	Samatta 75'

Estádio do Zimpeto, Maputo
Referee: Denis Batte (Uganda)

Mozambique won 4–3 on aggregate and advanced to Group F.

== Group stage ==
The draw for the group stage was held on 27 April 2014 at Cairo, Egypt. The 21 teams ranked 1–21 and the seven winners of the second round played in this round. Teams ranked 1–7 were seeded into Pot 1, teams ranked 8–14 were seeded into Pot 2, teams ranked 15–21 were seeded into Pot 3, and the seven winners of the second round were seeded into Pot 4. The 28 teams were drawn into seven groups of four, with each group containing one team from each pot. Each group was played on a home-and-away round-robin basis. The winners and runners-up of each group, plus the best third-placed team, qualified for the finals.

Tiebreakers

The teams were ranked according to points (3 points for a win, 1 point for a draw, 0 points for a loss). If tied on points, tiebreakers were applied in the following order:

1. Number of points obtained in games between the teams concerned;
2. Goal difference in games between the teams concerned;
3. Goals scored in games between the teams concerned;
4. Away goals scored in games between the teams concerned;
5. If, after applying criteria 1 to 4 to several teams, two teams still had an equal ranking, criteria 1 to 4 were reapplied exclusively to the matches between the two teams in question to determine their final rankings. If this procedure did not lead to a decision, criteria 6 to 9 applied;
6. Goal difference in all games;
7. Goals scored in all games;
8. Away goals scored in all games;
9. Drawing of lots.

Legend
Group winners, runners-up, and the best third-placed team qualified for the finals

=== Group A ===
Team	Pld	W	D	L	GF	GA	GD	Pts	RSA	CGO	NGA	SDN
South Africa	6	3	3	0	9	3	+6	12		0–0	0–0	2–1
Congo	6	3	1	2	6	6	0	10	0–2		0–2	2–0
Nigeria	6	2	2	2	9	7	+2	8	2–2	2–3		3–1
Sudan	6	1	0	5	3	11	−8	3	0–3	0–1	1–0	

=== Group B ===
Team	Pld	W	D	L	GF	GA	GD	Pts	ALG	MLI	MWI	ETH
Algeria	6	5	0	1	11	4	+7	15		1–0	3–0	3–1
Mali	6	3	0	3	8	6	+2	9	2–0		2–0	2–3
Malawi	6	2	1	3	5	9	−4	7	0–2	2–0		3–2
Ethiopia	6	1	1	4	7	12	−5	4	1–2	0–2	0–0	

=== Group C ===
Team	Pld	W	D	L	GF	GA	GD	Pts	GAB	BFA	ANG	LES
Gabon	6	3	3	0	9	4	+5	12		2–0	1–0	4–2
Burkina Faso	6	3	2	1	8	4	+4	11	1–1		1–1	2–0
Angola	6	1	3	2	5	5	0	6	0–0	0–3		4–0
Lesotho	6	0	2	4	3	12	−9	2	1–1	0–1	0–0	

=== Group D ===
Team	Pld	W	D	L	GF	GA	GD	Pts	CMR	CIV	COD	SLE
Cameroon	6	4	2	0	9	1	+8	14		4–1	1–0	2–0
Ivory Coast	6	3	1	2	13	11	+2	10	0–0		3–4	2–1
DR Congo	6	3	0	3	10	9	+1	9	0–2	1–2		3–1
Sierra Leone	6	0	1	5	3	14	−11	1	0–0	1–5	0–2	

=== Group E ===
Team	Pld	W	D	L	GF	GA	GD	Pts	GHA	GUI	UGA	TOG
Ghana	6	3	2	1	11	7	+4	11		3–1	1–1	3–1
Guinea	6	3	1	2	10	8	+2	10	1–1		2–0	2–1
Uganda	6	2	1	3	4	5	−1	7	1–0	2–0		0–1
Togo	6	2	0	4	7	12	−5	6	2–3	1–4	1–0	

=== Group F ===
Team	Pld	W	D	L	GF	GA	GD	Pts	CPV	ZAM	MOZ	NIG
Cape Verde	6	4	0	2	9	6	+3	12		2–1	1–0	3–1
Zambia	6	3	2	1	6	2	+4	11	1–0		0–0	3–0
Mozambique	6	1	3	2	4	4	0	6	2–0	0–1		1–1
Niger	6	0	3	3	4	11	−7	3	1–3	0–0	1–1	

=== Group G ===
Team	Pld	W	D	L	GF	GA	GD	Pts	TUN	SEN	EGY	BOT
Tunisia	6	4	2	0	6	2	+4	14		1–0	2–1	2–1
Senegal	6	4	1	1	8	1	+7	13	0–0		2–0	3–0
Egypt	6	2	0	4	5	6	−1	6	0–1	0–1		2–0
Botswana	6	0	1	5	1	11	−10	1	0–0	0–2	0–2	

=== Ranking of third-placed teams ===
Grp	Team	Pld	W	D	L	GF	GA	GD	Pts
D	DR Congo	6	3	0	3	10	9	+1	9
A	Nigeria	6	2	2	2	9	7	+2	8
E	Uganda	6	2	1	3	4	5	−1	7
B	Malawi	6	2	1	3	5	9	−4	7
C	Angola	6	1	3	2	5	5	0	6
F	Mozambique	6	1	3	2	4	4	0	6
G	Egypt	6	2	0	4	5	6	−1	6

== Goalscorers ==
6 goals

- (Burkina Faso) Jonathan Pitroipa

5 goals

- (Guinea) Seydouba Soumah

4 goals

- (Benin) Stéphane Sessègnon
- (Cameroon) Vincent Aboubakar
- (Ivory Coast) Salomon Kalou
- (South Africa) Tokelo Rantie
- (Uganda) Geofrey Massa

3 goals

- (Algeria) Yacine Brahimi
- (Cameroon) Clinton N'Jie
- (Republic of the Congo) Férébory Doré
- (Gabon) Malick Evouna
- (Egypt) Mohamed Salah
- (Ghana) Asamoah Gyan
- (Mozambique) Domingues
- (Democratic Republic of the Congo) Jeremy Bokila
- (Rwanda) Daddy Birori

2 goals

- (Algeria) Riyad Mahrez
- (Botswana) Joel Mogorosi
- (Botswana) Lemponye Tshireletso
- (Cape Verde) Héldon
- (Cape Verde) Zé Luís
- (Chad) Ezechiel N'Douassel
- (Republic of the Congo) Thievy Bifouma
- (Republic of the Congo) Prince Oniangue
- (Democratic Republic of the Congo) Yannick Bolasie
- (Democratic Republic of the Congo) Cédric Mongongu
- (Ethiopia) Getaneh Kebede
- (Ethiopia) Oumed Oukri
- (Gabon) Lévy Madinda
- (Gabon) Pierre-Emerick Aubameyang
- (Ghana) Emmanuel Agyemang-Badu
- (Ghana) André Ayew
- (Guinea) Ibrahima Traoré
- (Guinea-Bissau) Cícero
- (Guinea) Idrissa Sylla
- (Ivory Coast) Gervinho
- (Ivory Coast) Max Gradel
- (Ivory Coast) Yaya Touré
- (Lesotho) Tsepo Seturumane
- (Malawi) Gabadinho Mhango
- (Malawi) Atusaye Nyondo
- (Mali) Bakary Sako
- (Mali) Mustapha Yatabaré
- (Mozambique) Isac
- (Mozambique) Josemar
- (Mozambique) Sonito
- (Niger) Moctar Yacouba
- (Nigeria) Sone Aluko
- (Nigeria) Ahmed Musa
- (Nigeria) Aaron Samuel Olanare
- (Senegal) Sadio Mané
- (Sierra Leone) Umaru Bangura
- (South Africa) Bongani Ndulula
- (South Africa) Sibusiso Vilakazi
- (Senegal) Papiss Cissé
- (Senegal) Mame Biram Diouf
- (Senegal) Kara Mbodj
- (Senegal) Moussa Sow
- (Sudan) Salah Ibrahim
- (Tanzania) Khamis Mcha
- (Togo) Emmanuel Adebayor
- (Tunisia) Yassine Chikhaoui
- (Tunisia) Wahbi Khazri

1 goal

- (Algeria) Sofiane Feghouli
- (Algeria) Rafik Halliche
- (Algeria) Carl Medjani
- (Algeria) Djamel Mesbah
- (Algeria) Islam Slimani
- (Algeria) Hillal Soudani
- (Angola) Ary Papel
- (Angola) Bastos
- (Angola) Djalma Campos
- (Angola) Love
- (Benin) Frédéric Gounongbé
- (Botswana) Jerome Ramatlhakwane
- (Burkina Faso) Aristide Bancé
- (Burkina Faso) Alain Traoré
- (Cameroon) Léonard Kweuke
- (Cameroon) Stéphane Mbia
- (Cape Verde) Odaïr Fortes
- (Cape Verde) Kuca
- (Cape Verde) Ryan Mendes
- (Cape Verde) Garry Rodrigues
- (Cape Verde) Júlio Tavares
- (Central African Republic) Foxi Kéthévoama
- (Chad) Rodrigue Ninga
- (Comoros) Yacine Saandi
- (Republic of the Congo) Ladislas Douniama
- (Republic of the Congo) Césaire Gandzé
- (Republic of the Congo) Sylvère Ganvoula
- (Republic of the Congo) Francis N'Ganga
- (Democratic Republic of the Congo) Junior Kabananga
- (Democratic Republic of the Congo) Neeskens Kebano
- (Democratic Republic of the Congo) Firmin Ndombe Mubele
- (Egypt) Mohamed Elneny
- (Egypt) Amr Gamal
- (Equatorial Guinea) Dio
- (Equatorial Guinea) Mauricio Mina
- (Equatorial Guinea) César Augusto Rivas
- (Ethiopia) Abebaw Butako
- (Ethiopia) Saladin Said
- (Ethiopia) Yussuf Saleh
- (Gabon) Samson Mbingui
- (Gabon) Johann Obiang
- (Ghana) Christian Atsu
- (Ghana) Mubarak Wakaso
- (Ghana) Abdul Majeed Waris
- (Guinea) Mohamed Yattara
- (Guinea-Bissau) Ansumane Faty
- (Ivory Coast) Wilfried Bony
- (Ivory Coast) Seydou Doumbia
- (Ivory Coast) Kolo Touré
- (Kenya) Ayub Masika
- (Kenya) Johanna Omolo
- (Lesotho) Emmanuel Lekhanya
- (Lesotho) Bushi Moletsane
- (Lesotho) Mabuti Potloane
- (Liberia) Anthony Laffor
- (Madagascar) Carolus Andriamatsinoro
- (Madagascar) Faneva Imà Andriatsima
- (Malawi) Frank Banda
- (Malawi) John Banda
- (Malawi) Essau Kanyenda
- (Malawi) Robin Ngalande
- (Malawi) Robert Ng'ambi
- (Mali) Cheick Diabaté
- (Mali) Abdoulay Diaby
- (Mali) Seydou Keita
- (Mali) Sambou Yatabaré
- (Mauritania) Adama Ba
- (Mauritania) Bessam
- (Mauritania) Ismaël Diakité
- (Mauritania) Demba Sow
- (Mozambique) Diogo
- (Mozambique) Kito
- (Mozambique) Mexer
- (Mozambique) Reginaldo
- (Namibia) Rudolf Bester
- (Niger) Mahamane Cissé
- (Niger) Moussa Maâzou
- (Nigeria) Efe Ambrose
- (Nigeria) Gbolahan Salami
- (Nigeria) Ikechukwu Uche
- (Rwanda) Meddie Kagere
- (Rwanda) Michel Ndahinduka
- (Senegal) Dame N'Doye
- (Sierra Leone) Moustapha Bangura
- (Sierra Leone) Khalifa Jabbie
- (Sierra Leone) Kei Kamara
- (Sierra Leone) Medo Kamara
- (Sierra Leone) Sulaiman Sesay-Fullah
- (South Africa) Thulani Serero
- (Sudan) Bakri Almadina
- (Eswatini) Sidumo Shongwe
- (Tanzania) John Bocco
- (Tanzania) Nadir Haroub
- (Tanzania) Mbwana Samatta
- (Tanzania) Thomas Ulimwengu
- (Togo) Serge Akakpo
- (Togo) Floyd Ayité
- (Togo) Jonathan Ayité
- (Togo) Prince Segbefia
- (Togo) Donou Kokou
- (Tunisia) Fakhreddine Ben Youssef
- (Tunisia) Ferjani Sassi
- (Uganda) Savio Kabugo
- (Uganda) Hamis Kiiza
- (Uganda) Brian Majwega
- (Uganda) Tony Mawejje
- (Uganda) Robert Ssentongo
- (Zambia) Rainford Kalaba
- (Zambia) Ronald Kampamba
- (Zambia) Emmanuel Mayuka
- (Zambia) Jacob Mulenga
- (Zambia) Kennedy Mweene
- (Zambia) Given Singuluma
- (Zimbabwe) Willard Katsande
- (Zimbabwe) Danny Phiri

Own goal

- (Central African Republic) Fernander Kassaï (playing against Guinea-Bissau)
- (Lesotho) Tsoanelo Koetle (playing against Angola)
- (Liberia) Prince Jetoh (playing against Lesotho)
- (Togo) Sadat Ouro-Akoriko (playing against Ghana)
