= 2015 Africa Cup of Nations qualification Group A =

Football tournament qualification stage

Group A of the 2015 Africa Cup of Nations qualification tournament was one of the seven groups to decide the teams which qualified for the 2015 Africa Cup of Nations finals tournament. Group A consisted of four teams: South Africa, Congo, Nigeria, and Sudan, who played against each other home-and-away in a round-robin format.

== Standings ==
Team	Pld	W	D	L	GF	GA	GD	Pts	RSA	CGO	NGA	SDN
South Africa	6	3	3	0	9	3	+6	12		0–0	0–0	2–1
Congo	6	3	1	2	6	6	0	10	0–2		0–2	2–0
Nigeria	6	2	2	2	9	7	+2	8	2–2	2–3		3–1
Sudan	6	1	0	5	3	11	−8	3	0–3	0–1	1–0	

== Matches ==
5 September 2014
20:00 UTC+3

Sudan	0–3	South Africa
	Report	Vilakazi 55', 61'; Ndulula 79'

Al-Merrikh Stadium, Omdurman
Referee: Mehdi Abid Charef (Algeria)
6 September 2014
17:00 UTC+1

Nigeria	2–3	Congo
Ambrose 13'; Salami 89'	Report	Oniangue 16'; Bifouma 40', 54' (pen.)

U. J. Esuene Stadium, Calabar
Referee: Joseph Lamptey (Ghana)

10 September 2014
15:30 UTC+1

Congo	2–0	Sudan
Doré 3'; Oniangue 90'	Report

Stade Municipal, Pointe-Noire
Referee: Mohamed Ragab Omar (Libya)
10 September 2014
20:05 UTC+2

South Africa	0–0	Nigeria
	Report

Cape Town Stadium, Cape Town
Referee: Joshua Bondo (Botswana)

11 October 2014
15:30 UTC+1

Congo	0–2	South Africa
	Report	Ndulula 52'; Rantie 54'

Stade Municipal, Pointe-Noire
Referee: Bouchaïb El Ahrach (Morocco)
11 October 2014
20:00 UTC+3

Sudan	1–0	Nigeria
Almadina 41'	Report

Khartoum Stadium, Khartoum
Referee: Janny Sikazwe (Zambia)

15 October 2014
17:00 UTC+1

Nigeria	3–1	Sudan
Musa 48', 89'; Olanare 65'	Report	Ibrahim 55'

Abuja Stadium, Abuja
Referee: Néant Alioum (Cameroon)
15 October 2014
20:05 UTC+2

South Africa	0–0	Congo
	Report

Peter Mokaba Stadium, Polokwane
Referee: Badara Diatta (Senegal)

15 November 2014
15:00 UTC+2

South Africa	2–1	Sudan
Serero 39'; Rantie 53'	Report	Ibrahim 77'

Moses Mabhida Stadium, Durban
Referee: Mohamed Benouza (Algeria)
15 November 2014
15:30 UTC+1

Congo	0–2	Nigeria
	Report	Uche 59' (pen.); Olanare 90'

Stade Municipal, Pointe-Noire
Referee: Gehad Grisha (Egypt)

19 November 2014
18:00 UTC+1

Nigeria	2–2	South Africa
Aluko 68', 90+4'	Report	Rantie 42', 48'

Akwa Ibom Stadium, Uyo
Referee: Rajindraparsad Seechurn (Mauritius)
19 November 2014
20:00 UTC+3

Sudan	0–1	Congo
	Report	N'Ganga 59'

Khartoum Stadium, Khartoum
Referee: Sylvester Kirwa (Kenya)
