= 2015 Africa Cup of Nations qualification Group D =

Football tournament qualification stage

Group D of the 2015 Africa Cup of Nations qualification tournament was one of the seven groups to decide the teams which qualified for the 2015 Africa Cup of Nations finals tournament. Group D consisted of four teams: Cameroon, Ivory Coast, DR Congo, and Sierra Leone, who played against each other home-and-away in a round-robin format.

== Standings ==
Team	Pld	W	D	L	GF	GA	GD	Pts	CMR	CIV	COD	SLE
Cameroon	6	4	2	0	9	1	+8	14		4–1	1–0	2–0
Ivory Coast	6	3	1	2	13	11	+2	10	0–0		3–4	2–1
DR Congo	6	3	0	3	10	9	+1	9	0–2	1–2		3–1
Sierra Leone	6	0	1	5	3	14	−11	1	0–0	1–5	0–2	

== Matches ==
6 September 2014
14:00 UTC+2

DR Congo	0–2	Cameroon
	Report	N'Jie 44'; Aboubakar 81'

Stade TP Mazembe, Lubumbashi
Referee: Eric Otogo-Castane (Gabon)
6 September 2014
17:00 UTC±0

Ivory Coast	2–1	Sierra Leone
Doumbia 64'; Gervinho 66'	Report	K. Kamara 42'

Stade Félix Houphouët-Boigny, Abidjan
Referee: Juste Ephrem Zio (Burkina Faso)

10 September 2014
14:00 UTC+2

Sierra Leone	0–2	DR Congo
	Report	Mubele 51'; Bokila 88'

Stade TP Mazembe, Lubumbashi (DR Congo) (Note: Sierra Leone played their group stage home matches outside of the country due to the 2014 West Africa Ebola virus outbreak.)
Referee: Youssef Essrayri (Tunisia)
10 September 2014
15:00 UTC+1

Cameroon	4–1	Ivory Coast
N'Jie 14', 75'; Aboubakar 37', 53'	Report	Y. Touré 24'

Ahmadou Ahidjo Stadium, Yaoundé
Referee: Rajindraparsad Seechurn (Mauritius)

11 October 2014
15:00 UTC+1

Sierra Leone	0–0	Cameroon
	Report

Ahmadou Ahidjo Stadium, Yaoundé (Cameroon)
Referee: Denis Batte (Uganda)
11 October 2014
15:30 UTC+1

DR Congo	1–2	Ivory Coast
Mongongu 68' (pen.)	Report	Bony 24'; Gradel 83'

Stade Tata Raphaël, Kinshasa
Referee: Mehdi Abid Charef (Algeria)

15 October 2014
15:00 UTC+1

Cameroon	2–0	Sierra Leone
Kweuke 3'; Mbia 7'	Report

Ahmadou Ahidjo Stadium, Yaoundé
Referee: Thierry Nkurunziza (Burundi)
15 October 2014
17:00 UTC±0

Ivory Coast	3–4	DR Congo
Y. Touré 24'; Kalou 68', 72'	Report	Kebano 20'; Kabananga 34'; Bokila 36', 88'

Stade Félix Houphouët-Boigny, Abidjan
Referee: Bakary Gassama (Gambia)

14 November 2014
15:00 UTC±0

Sierra Leone	1–5	Ivory Coast
M. Bangura 25'	Report	K. Touré 7'; Kalou 49', 73'; Gradel 53'; Gervinho 60'

Stade Félix Houphouët-Boigny, Abidjan (Ivory Coast)
Referee: Koman Coulibaly (Mali)
15 November 2014
15:00 UTC+1

Cameroon	1–0	DR Congo
Aboubakar 71'	Report

Ahmadou Ahidjo Stadium, Yaoundé
Referee: Joshua Bondo (Botswana)

19 November 2014
14:00 UTC±0

Ivory Coast	0–0	Cameroon
	Report

Stade Félix Houphouët-Boigny, Abidjan
Referee: Bouchaïb El Ahrach (Morocco)
19 November 2014
15:00 UTC+1

DR Congo	3–1	Sierra Leone
Bolasie 44', 90'; Mongongu 61' (pen.)	Report	M. Kamara 27'

Stade Tata Raphaël, Kinshasa
Referee: Hagi Wiish (Somalia)

== Goalscorers ==
4 goals:

- (Cameroon) Vincent Aboubakar
- (Ivory Coast) Salomon Kalou

3 goals:

- (Cameroon) Clinton N'Jie
- (Democratic Republic of the Congo) Jeremy Bokila

2 goals:

- (Ivory Coast) Gervinho
- (Ivory Coast) Max Gradel
- (Ivory Coast) Yaya Touré
- (Democratic Republic of the Congo) Yannick Bolasie
- (Democratic Republic of the Congo) Cédric Mongongu

1 goals:

- (Cameroon) Léonard Kweuke
- (Cameroon) Stéphane Mbia
- (Democratic Republic of the Congo) Junior Kabananga
- (Democratic Republic of the Congo) Neeskens Kebano
- (Democratic Republic of the Congo) Ndombe Mubele
- (Ivory Coast) Wilfried Bony
- (Ivory Coast) Seydou Doumbia
- (Ivory Coast) Kolo Touré
- (Sierra Leone) Kei Kamara
- (Sierra Leone) Moustapha Bangura
- (Sierra Leone) Medo Kamara
