= 2005 LG Cup (Egypt) =

2005 LG Cup Four Nations Tournament
Tournament details
- Host country: Egypt
- City: Cairo
- Dates: 27–29 December
- Teams: 4
- Venue(s): (in 1 host city)

Final positions
- Champions: Egypt (1st title)
- Runners-up: Senegal
- Third place: Uganda
- Fourth place: Ecuador

Tournament statistics
- Matches played: 4
- Goals scored: 14 (3.5 per match)
- Top scorer(s): (Egypt) Amr Zaki (4 goals)

The 2005 LG Cup was an exhibition association football tournament that took place in Egypt. The hosts won the tournament after beating Senegal 4–2 in the final.

== Participants ==
Kenya were originally invited, but the invitation was withdrawn by the organizers due to the internal wranglings in the KFF (with two groups claiming its leadership, both appointing a different coach) and instead, they replaced them with Uganda. The participants were:

- Egypt
- Senegal
- Uganda
- Ecuador

== Results ==
=== Semifinals ===
27 December 2005

Senegal	2–1	Ecuador
Camara 22'; Keita 90'	Report	Borja 40'

Cairo International Stadium, Cairo

27 December 2005

Egypt	2–0	Uganda
Zaki 45', 66'	Report

Cairo International Stadium, Cairo

=== Third place match ===
29 December 2005

Uganda	2–1	Ecuador
Massa 47'; Muwanga 54'	Report	Kaviedes 2'

Cairo International Stadium, Cairo

=== Final ===
29 December 2005

Egypt	4–2	Senegal
Moustafa 14'; Motaeb 22'; Zaki 86', 90+3'	Report	Mendy 2'; Konaté 50'

Cairo International Stadium, Cairo
Attendance: 60,000

2005 LG Cup (Egypt) winner

Egypt
First title

== Statistics ==
=== Goalscorers ===
There were 14 goals scored in 4 matches, for an average of 3.5 goals per match.

4 goals

- (Egypt) Amr Zaki

1 goal

- (Ecuador) Felix Borja
- (Ecuador) Ivan Kaviedes
- (Uganda) Geoffrey Massa
- (Uganda) Martin Muwanga
- (Egypt) Hassan Moustafa
- (Egypt) Emad Motaeb
- (Senegal) Frédéric Mendy
- (Senegal) Mamadou Konaté
- (Senegal) Souleymane Camara
- (Senegal) Sidy Keita

== See also ==
- LG Cup
