= Thievy Bifouma =

Congolese-French footballer (born 1992)

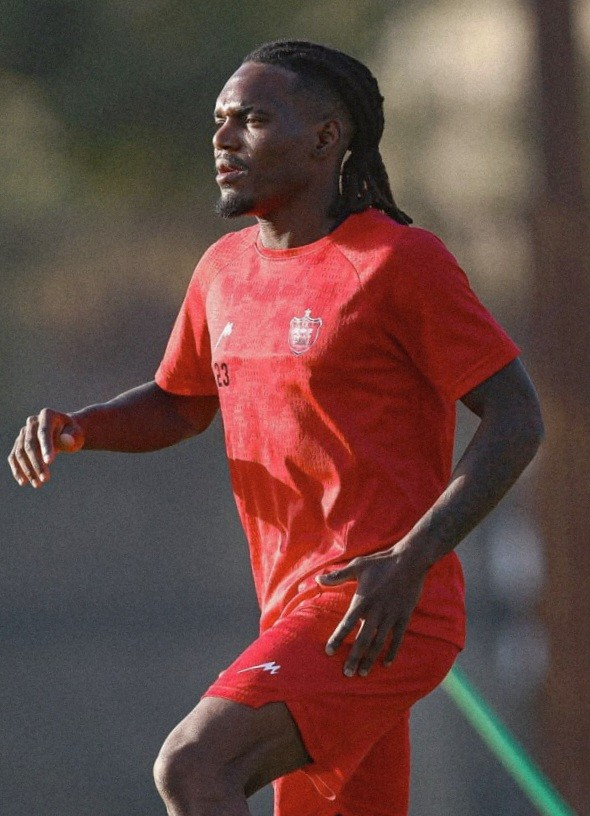
- Bifouma training with Persepolis in 2025

Personal information
- Full name: Thievy Guivane Bifouma Koulossa
- Date of birth: 13 May 1992 (age 34)
- Place of birth: Saint-Denis, France
- Height: 1.80 m (5 ft 11 in)
- Position: Forward

Team information
- Current team: Persepolis
- Number: 23

Youth career
- 1999–2006: CS Meaux
- 2006–2010: Strasbourg
- 2010–2011: Espanyol

Senior career*
Years	Team	Apps	(Gls)
2010–2011	Espanyol B	6	(3)
2011–2016	Espanyol	32	(4)
2012–2013	→ Las Palmas (loan)	38	(11)
2014	→ West Bromwich Albion (loan)	6	(2)
2014–2015	→ Almería (loan)	29	(4)
2015–2016	→ Granada (loan)	7	(0)
2016	→ Reims (loan)	14	(4)
2016–2017	Bastia	14	(2)
2017	Osmanlıspor	17	(1)
2017–2018	Sivasspor	28	(6)
2018–2019	Ankaragücü	13	(1)
2019–2020	Yeni Malatyaspor	31	(8)
2020–2021	Shenzhen	9	(0)
2021	→ Heilongjiang Ice City (loan)	0	(0)
2022	Bursaspor	10	(1)
2022–2023	OFI	11	(0)
2023–2024	A.E. Kifisia	29	(2)
2024–2025	Esteghlal Khuzestan	25	(5)
2025–	Persepolis	25	(5)

International career^{‡}
2011	France U20	1	(0)
2012–2013	France U21	3	(0)
2014–	Congo	41	(16)
- * Club domestic league appearances and goals as of 20 November 2026 ‡ National team caps and goals as of 10 September 2023

Thievy Guivane Bifouma Koulossa (born 13 May 1992) is a professional footballer who plays as a forward for Persian Gulf Pro League club Persepolis.

He spent most of his early career in Spain, totalling 68 La Liga games and eight goals for Espanyol, Almería and Granada in addition to a season on loan at Las Palmas in the Segunda División. As well as brief spells in England with West Bromwich Albion and France with Reims and Bastia, he represented four clubs in Turkey's Süper Lig.

Formerly a youth international for France, where he was born, Bifouma made his senior debut for the Congo in 2014. He competed at the 2015 Africa Cup of Nations, where he was joint top scorer.

== Club career ==
=== Espanyol ===
Bifouma was born in Saint-Denis, Seine-Saint-Denis. He joined RCD Espanyol in Spain in early 2010, not yet aged 18, signing from RC Strasbourg Alsace. On 13 March 2011, he made his debut with the Catalans' first team, after coming on as a substitute for Joan Verdú in the dying minutes of a 2–0 La Liga home win against Deportivo de La Coruña.

On 10 August 2011, in the Copa Catalunya final, Bifouma netted a hat-trick in a 3–0 victory over a FC Barcelona team that was filled with reserve and youth players. On 17 December, he scored his first goal with the main squad, opening an eventual 2–1 away defeat of Sporting de Gijón.

In September 2012, Bifouma was loaned to UD Las Palmas of Segunda División. After a successful spell, he extended his contract with Espanyol until 2017.

On 31 January 2014, Bifouma signed for West Bromwich Albion on a loan deal with a view to a permanent transfer, being awarded the number 50 shirt. He made his debut in the Premier League eight days later, playing the second half and scoring within 36 seconds of taking the pitch in a 3–1 away loss against Crystal Palace.

Bifouma moved to fellow top-division club UD Almería on 13 August 2014, in a season-long loan. On 19 March of the following year, he was suspended for one month due to allegations of breach of contract with his former agent; the ban was lifted days later, and he continued to appear regularly for the Andalusians, which suffered relegation.

On 19 August 2015, Bifouma was loaned to Granada CF of the same league for one year. He finished the season with Stade de Reims, also owned by Espanyol.

=== Turkey ===
On 28 July 2016, Bifouma signed for fellow French Ligue 1 club SC Bastia. He was on the move again in the following transfer window, joining Süper Lig's Osmanlıspor on a three-and-a-half-year deal. He scored just one goal in 22 total games for the team from Ankara, in their 5–1 win at Adanaspor in the Süper Lig on 19 February 2017.

Remaining in the same league, Bifouma signed a one-year contract with Sivasspor on 9 September 2017. Only eight days later, he netted twice in a 4–2 victory on his return to the Osmanlı Stadium.

Bifouma went back to the Turkish capital in June 2018, agreeing to a three-year deal at MKE Ankaragücü. He scored once during his brief tenure, a late consolation in a 2–1 home defeat to Kasımpaşa S.K. on 2 September, and moved on again on 22 January 2019 when he signed with third-placed Yeni Malatyaspor for an undisclosed fee. On 15 December that year, he scored in a 2–0 win at Beşiktaş J.K. which broke the Istanbul club's six-match winning streak.

On 17 July 2020, Bifouma moved to the Chinese Super League's Shenzhen F.C. on an undisclosed contract for a fee of around €3 million. The following 19 April, he was released by mutual accord and signed for Heilongjiang Ice City F.C. in the country's second tier.

Ten months after leaving China with no goals and one assist to his name from nine appearances, Bifouma returned to Turkey in February 2022, signing for a Bursaspor side fighting to remain in the TFF First League. He was one of 17 players to leave following their relegation.

=== Greece ===
On 16 September 2022, Bifouma joined OFI Crete F.C. on a two-year contract. The following season, he moved to fellow Super League Greece side A.E. Kifisia FC.

=== Iran ===
In August 2024, Bifouma signed for Esteghlal Khuzestan F.C. in the Persian Gulf Pro League; he agreed to the deal with the express intention of facing Cristiano Ronaldo of Al Nassr FC in the AFC Champions League Elite, thinking he was joining Esteghlal F.C. instead.

Bifouma remained in the country and division for the 2025–26 campaign, joining Persepolis F.C. on a two-year contract.

== International career ==
A French youth international, Bifouma opted to represent Congo at the senior level, receiving a FIFA clearance on 1 August 2014. He made his full debut a day later, replacing Julsy Boukama-Kaya in the 68th minute of a 2–0 away loss against Rwanda in the second leg of the 2015 Africa Cup of Nations second qualification round.

On 6 September 2014, in the same competition, Bifouma scored a brace in a 3–2 win in Nigeria. At the 2015 Africa Cup of Nations finals, he netted Congo's first goal of the tournament in a 1–1 draw with hosts Equatorial Guinea. He also scored the opener in their 2–1 group phase victory over Burkina Faso, a result which qualified the nation to the quarter-finals for the first time since 1992, where he grabbed his final goal against the DR Congo, putting his team ahead 2–0 but in an eventual 4–2 defeat; with three goals, he was one of five joint top scorers.

Having missed over two years of games for reasons including travel restrictions in China during the COVID-19 pandemic, Bifouma was recalled to the Congolese squad in September 2020. He finally played again the following 26 March, in a goalless draw at home to Senegal in 2021 Africa Cup of Nations qualification.

== Career statistics ==
=== Club ===
As of 20 November 2026

Appearances and goals by club, season and competition
Club	Season	League			Cup		Continental		Total	
Club	Season	Division	Apps	Goals	Apps	Goals	Apps	Goals	Apps	Goals
Espanyol B	2010–11	Tercera División	6	3	0	0	—		6	3
Espanyol	2010–11	La Liga	2	0	0	0	—		2	0
Espanyol	2011–12	La Liga	19	1	4 (Note: Appearances in Copa del Rey)	0	—		23	1
Espanyol	2012–13	La Liga	0	0	0	0	—		0	0
Espanyol	2013–14	La Liga	11	3	3	0	—		14	3
Espanyol	Total		32	4	7	0	0	0	39	4
Las Palmas (loan)	2012–13	Segunda División	38	11	6	2	—		44	13
West Bromwich Albion (loan)	2013–14	Premier League	6	2	0	0	—		6	2
Almería (loan)	2014–15	La Liga	29	4	1	0	—		29	4
Granada (loan)	2015–16	La Liga	7	0	1	0	—		8	0
Reims (loan)	2015–16	Ligue 1	14	4	0	0	—		14	4
Bastia	2016–17	Ligue 1	14	2	1 (Note: Appearance in Coupe de la Ligue)	0	—		15	2
Osmanlıspor	2016–17	Süper Lig	16	1	3 (Note: Appearances in Turkish Cup)	0	2 (Note: Appearances in UEFA Europa League)	0	21	1
Osmanlıspor	2017–18	Süper Lig	1	0	0	0	—		1	0
Osmanlıspor	Total		17	1	3	0	2	0	22	1
Sivasspor	2017–18	Süper Lig	28	6	2	0	—		30	6
Ankaragücü	2018–19	Süper Lig	13	1	0	0	—		13	1
Yeni Malatyaspor	2018–19	Süper Lig	10	2	2	0	—		12	2
Yeni Malatyaspor	2019–20	Süper Lig	21	6	4	0	4	0	29	6
Yeni Malatyaspor	Total		31	8	6	0	4	0	41	8
Shenzhen	2020	Chinese Super League	9	0	1 (Note: Appearance in Chinese FA Cup)	0	—		10	0
Heilongjiang Ice City (loan)	2021	China League One	0	0	0	0	—		0	0
Bursaspor	2021–22	TFF First League	10	1	0	0	—		10	1
OFI	2022–23	Super League Greece	11	0	0	0	—		11	0
A.E. Kifisia	2023–24	Super League Greece	29	2	2	0	—		31	2
Esteghlal Khuzestan	2024–25	Persian Gulf Pro League	25	5	1	0	—		26	5
Persepolis	2025–26	Persian Gulf Pro League	12	1	1	0	1	0	14	1
Persepolis	2026–27	Persian Gulf Pro League	13	4	0	0	—		13	4
Persepolis	Total		25	5	1	0	1	0	27	5
Career total			344	53	32	2	7	0	383	55

=== International ===
As of 10 September 2023

Appearances and goals by national team and year
National team	Year	Apps	Goals
Congo	2014	7	2
Congo	2015	9	8
Congo	2016	4	0
Congo	2017	7	2
Congo	2018	4	3
Congo	2019	0	0
Congo	2020	0	0
Congo	2021	2	0
Congo	2022	4	0
Congo	2023	4	1
Total		41	16

As of 23 March 2023
Scores and results list Congo's goal tally first, score column indicates score after each Bifouma goal.

List of international goals scored by Thievy Bifouma
No.	Date	Venue	Opponent	Score	Result	Competition
1	6 September 2014	U. J. Esuene, Calabar, Nigeria	Nigeria	2–1	3–2	2015 Africa Cup of Nations qualification
2	6 September 2014	U. J. Esuene, Calabar, Nigeria	Nigeria	3–1	3–2	2015 Africa Cup of Nations qualification
3	10 January 2015	Léopold Sédar Senghor, Dakar, Senegal	Cape Verde	1–0	2–3	Friendly
4	17 January 2015	Estadio de Bata, Bata, Equatorial Guinea	Equatorial Guinea	1–1	1–1	2015 Africa Cup of Nations
5	25 January 2015	Estadio de Bata, Bata, Equatorial Guinea	Burkina Faso	1–0	2–1	2015 Africa Cup of Nations
6	31 January 2015	Estadio de Bata, Bata, Equatorial Guinea	DR Congo	2–0	2–4	2015 Africa Cup of Nations
7	13 October 2015	Alphonse Massemba-Débat, Brazzaville, Congo	Benin	1–0	2–1	Friendly
8	13 October 2015	Alphonse Massemba-Débat, Brazzaville, Congo	Benin	2–1	2–1	Friendly
9	14 November 2015	Addis Ababa Stadium, Addis-Abeba, Ethiopia	Ethiopia	1–1	4–3	2018 FIFA World Cup qualification
10	17 November 2015	Alphonse Massemba-Débat, Brazzaville, Congo	Ethiopia	2–1	2–1	2018 FIFA World Cup qualification
11	10 June 2017	Stade des Martyrs, Kinshasa, DR Congo	DR Congo	1–1	1–3	2019 Africa Cup of Nations qualification
12	1 September 2017	Baba Yara, Kumasi, Ghana	Ghana	1–0	1–1	2018 FIFA World Cup qualification
13	25 March 2018	Aimé Bergéal, Mantes-la-Jolie, France	Guinea-Bissau	2–0	2–0	Friendly
14	9 September 2018	Alphonse Massemba-Débat, Brazzaville, Congo	Zimbabwe	1–1	1–1	2019 Africa Cup of Nations qualification
15	18 November 2018	Alphonse Massemba-Débat, Brazzaville, Congo	DR Congo	1–1	1–1	2019 Africa Cup of Nations qualification
16	23 March 2023	Alphonse Massemba-Débat, Brazzaville, Congo	South Sudan	1–1	1–2	2023 Africa Cup of Nations qualification

== See also ==
- List of top international men's football goalscorers by country
