= 2018 FIFA World Cup qualification – CAF third round =

Tournament details
- Dates: 7 October 2016 – 14 November 2017
- Teams: 20 (from 1 confederation)

Tournament statistics
- Matches played: 61
- Goals scored: 144 (2.36 per match)
- Attendance: 1,773,205 (29,069 per match)
- Top scorer(s): (Egypt) Mohamed Salah (5 goals)

The third round of CAF matches for 2018 FIFA World Cup qualification was played from 7 October 2016 to 14 November 2017.

== Format ==
A total of 20 teams which had advanced from the second round were drawn into five groups of four teams to play home-and-away round-robin matches. The winners of each group qualified for the 2018 FIFA World Cup.

== Seeding ==
The draw for the third round was held on 24 June 2016, 17:00 EET (UTC+2), at the CAF headquarters in Cairo, Egypt.

The seedings – initially released on 8 June 2016 – were based on a special edition of the FIFA World Rankings that included all matches up to 7 June 2016. This allowed the rankings to include results of the Africa Cup of Nations qualification games played between 3–5 June 2016. However, following a complaint by the Egyptian Football Association, it was reported that a further special ranking would be used. This seeding was released on 21 June. Following further complaints, the Emergency Bureau for the FIFA World Cup Qualifiers reversed the change, and restored the initial special rankings.

- Pot 1 contained the teams ranked 1–5.
- Pot 2 contained the teams ranked 6–10.
- Pot 3 contained the teams ranked 11–15.
- Pot 4 contained the teams ranked 16–20.

Each group contained one team from each of the four pots. The fixtures of each group were decided based on the respective draw position of each team, which was decided by drawing a ball with position numbers 1–4.

Note: Bolded teams qualified for the World Cup.

Pot 1	Pot 2	Pot 3	Pot 4
1. Algeria (31); 2. Ivory Coast (34); 3. Ghana (36); 4. **Senegal** (40); 5. **Tunisia** (45)	6. Cape Verde (46); 7. **Egypt** (47); 8. DR Congo (49); 9. **Nigeria** (57); 10. Mali (58)	11. Cameroon (59); 12. **Morocco** (60); 13. Guinea (62); 14. South Africa (66); 15. Congo (67)	16. Uganda (69); 17. Burkina Faso (71); 18. Zambia (83); 19. Gabon (88); 20. Libya (115)

== Groups ==
2018 FIFA World Cup qualification tiebreakers
In league format, the ranking of teams in each group was based on the following criteria (regulations Articles 20.6 and 20.7):
1. Points (3 points for a win, 1 point for a draw, 0 points for a loss)
2. Overall goal difference
3. Overall goals scored
4. Points in matches between tied teams
5. Goal difference in matches between tied teams
6. Goals scored in matches between tied teams
7. Away goals scored in matches between tied teams (if the tie was only between two teams in home-and-away league format)
8. Fair play points
  - first yellow card: minus 1 point
  - indirect red card (second yellow card): minus 3 points
  - direct red card: minus 4 points
  - yellow card and direct red card: minus 5 points
9. Drawing of lots by the FIFA Organising Committee

=== Group A ===
Pos	Team	Pld	W	D	L	GF	GA	GD	Pts	Qualification	Tunisia	Democratic Republic of the Congo	Libya	Guinea
1	Tunisia	6	4	2	0	11	4	+7	14	Qualification to 2018 FIFA World Cup	—	2–1	0–0	2–0
2	DR Congo	6	4	1	1	14	7	+7	13		2–2	—	4–0	3–1
3	Libya	6	1	1	4	4	10	−6	4		0–1	1–2	—	1–0
4	Guinea	6	1	0	5	6	14	−8	3		1–4	1–2	3–2	—

Source: FIFA
Rules for classification: Qualification tiebreakers
8 October 2016
18:30 UTC+1

DR Congo	4–0	Libya
Mbokani 6', 57'; Bolingi 45+2'; Mubele 68'	Report (FIFA); Report (CAF)

Stade des Martyrs, Kinshasa
Attendance: 71,000
Referee: Mahamadou Keita (Mali)
9 October 2016
18:00 UTC+1

Tunisia	2–0	Guinea
Abdennour 58'; Ben-Hatira 79'	Report (FIFA); Report (CAF)

Stade Mustapha Ben Jannet, Monastir
Attendance: 6,000
Referee: Thierry Nkurunziza (Burundi)

11 November 2016
20:00 UTC+1

Libya	0–1	Tunisia
	Report (FIFA); Report (CAF)	Khazri 50' (pen.)

Stade Omar Hamadi, Algiers (Algeria) (Note: Libya played their home matches outside Libya due to security concerns from the civil war.)
Attendance: 6,000
Referee: Davies Omweno (Kenya)
13 November 2016
17:30 UTC±0

Guinea	1–2	DR Congo
Soumah 23' (pen.)	Report (FIFA); Report (CAF)	Kebano 54'; Bolasie 57'

Stade du 28 Septembre, Conakry
Attendance: 30,000
Referee: Sidi Alioum (Cameroon)

31 August 2017
17:00 UTC±0

Guinea	3–2	Libya
N. Keïta 8'; D. Camara 23'; Alk. Bangoura 90+2'	Report (FIFA); Report (CAF)	Sabbou 87'; Zuway 88'

Stade du 28 Septembre, Conakry
Attendance: 13,750
Referee: Souleiman Ahmed Djama (Djibouti)
1 September 2017
21:00 UTC+1

Tunisia	2–1	DR Congo
Meriah 18' (pen.); Chaalali 47'	Report (FIFA); Report (CAF)	Bakambu 43'

Stade Olympique de Radès, Tunis
Attendance: 30,000
Referee: Eric Otogo-Castane (Gabon)

4 September 2017
20:00 UTC+1

Libya	1–0	Guinea
Elhouni 36'	Report (FIFA); Report (CAF)

Stade Mustapha Ben Jannet, Monastir (Tunisia)
Attendance: 1,500
Referee: Abou Coulibaly (Ivory Coast)
5 September 2017
18:30 UTC+1

DR Congo	2–2	Tunisia
Mbemba 10'; M'Poku 47'	Report (FIFA); Report (CAF)	Moke 77' (o.g.); Badri 78'

Stade des Martyrs, Kinshasa
Attendance: 80,000
Referee: Daniel Bennett (South Africa)

7 October 2017
17:00 UTC±0

Guinea	1–4	Tunisia
N. Keïta 36'	Report (FIFA); Report (CAF)	Msakni 45', 74', 90'; Ben Amor 83'

Stade du 28 Septembre, Conakry
Attendance: 12,000
Referee: Janny Sikazwe (Zambia)
7 October 2017
18:00 UTC+1

Libya	1–2	DR Congo
Elmusrati 68'	Report (FIFA); Report (CAF)	Bakambu 50'; Mubele 74'

Stade Mustapha Ben Jannet, Monastir (Tunisia)
Attendance: 750
Referee: Malang Diedhiou (Senegal)

11 November 2017
18:30 UTC+1

Tunisia	0–0	Libya
	Report (FIFA); Report (CAF)

Stade Olympique de Radès, Tunis
Attendance: 56,000
Referee: Hamada Nampiandraza (Madagascar)
11 November 2017
18:30 UTC+1

DR Congo	3–1	Guinea
Sidibé 61' (o.g.); Bolingi 90+2' (pen.); Kebano 90+3'	Report (FIFA); Report (CAF)	Keita Junior 71'

Stade des Martyrs, Kinshasa
Attendance: 3,000
Referee: Sidi Alioum (Cameroon)

=== Group B ===
Pos	Team	Pld	W	D	L	GF	GA	GD	Pts	Qualification	Nigeria	Zambia	Cameroon	Algeria
1	Nigeria	6	4	1	1	11	6	+5	13	Qualification to 2018 FIFA World Cup	—	1–0	4–0	3–1
2	Zambia	6	2	2	2	8	7	+1	8		1–2	—	2–2	3–1
3	Cameroon	6	1	4	1	7	9	−2	7		1–1	1–1	—	2–0
4	Algeria	6	1	1	4	6	10	−4	4		3–0 (Note: FIFA awarded Algeria a 3–0 win as a result of Nigeria fielding the ineligible player Shehu Abdullahi, after the match had ended in a 1–1 draw. Abdullahi failed to serve a one-game ban after receiving two yellow cards in the qualifying competition.)	0–1	1–1	—

Source: FIFA
Rules for classification: Qualification tiebreakers
Notes:
9 October 2016
14:30 UTC+2

Zambia	1–2	Nigeria
Mbesuma 71'	Report (FIFA); Report (CAF)	Iwobi 33'; Iheanacho 43'

Levy Mwanawasa Stadium, Ndola
Attendance: 38,000
Referee: Gehad Grisha (Egypt)
9 October 2016
20:30 UTC+1

Algeria	1–1	Cameroon
Soudani 7'	Report (FIFA); Report (CAF)	Moukandjo 24'

Mustapha Tchaker Stadium, Blida
Attendance: 35,000
Referee: Daniel Bennett (South Africa)

12 November 2016
16:00 UTC+1

Cameroon	1–1	Zambia
Aboubakar 45+3' (pen.)	Report (FIFA); Report (CAF)	Mbesuma 34'

Limbe Stadium, Limbe
Attendance: 12,000
Referee: Malang Diedhiou (Senegal)
12 November 2016
17:00 UTC+1

Nigeria	3–1	Algeria
Moses 24', 90+1'; Mikel 41'	Report (FIFA); Report (CAF)	Bentaleb 66'

Godswill Akpabio International Stadium, Uyo
Attendance: 28,000
Referee: Bakary Gassama (Gambia)

1 September 2017
17:00 UTC+1

Nigeria	4–0	Cameroon
Ighalo 29'; Mikel 43'; Moses 56'; Iheanacho 76'	Report (FIFA); Report (CAF)

Godswill Akpabio International Stadium, Uyo
Attendance: 27,000
Referee: Gehad Grisha (Egypt)
2 September 2017
15:00 UTC+2

Zambia	3–1	Algeria
Mwila 6', 32'; Mwepu 88'	Report (FIFA); Report (CAF)	Brahimi 54'

National Heroes Stadium, Lusaka
Attendance: 51,000
Referee: Hélder Martins de Carvalho (Angola)

4 September 2017
18:00 UTC+1

Cameroon	1–1	Nigeria
Aboubakar 74' (pen.)	Report (FIFA); Report (CAF)	Simon 30'

Ahmadou Ahidjo Stadium, Yaoundé
Attendance: 38,136
Referee: Bakary Gassama (Gambia)
5 September 2017
20:30 UTC+1

Algeria	0–1	Zambia
	Report (FIFA); Report (CAF)	Daka 66'

Chahid Hamlaoui Stadium, Constantine
Attendance: 35,000
Referee: Mahamadou Keita (Mali)

7 October 2017
17:00 UTC+1

Nigeria	1–0	Zambia
Iwobi 73'	Report (FIFA); Report (CAF)

Godswill Akpabio International Stadium, Uyo
Attendance: 80,000
Referee: Joshua Bondo (Botswana)
7 October 2017
17:00 UTC+1

Cameroon	2–0	Algeria
N'Jie 25'; Pangop 88'	Report (FIFA); Report (CAF)

Ahmadou Ahidjo Stadium, Yaoundé
Attendance: 35,000
Referee: Youssef Essrayri (Tunisia)

10 November 2017
20:30 UTC+1

Algeria	3–0 Awarded (Note: FIFA awarded Algeria a 3–0 win as a result of Nigeria fielding the ineligible player Shehu Abdullahi, after the match had ended in a 1–1 draw. Abdullahi failed to serve a one-game ban after receiving two yellow cards in the qualifying competition.)	Nigeria
Brahimi 88' (pen.)	Report (FIFA); Report (CAF)	Ogu 62'

Chahid Hamlaoui Stadium, Constantine
Attendance: 30,000
Referee: Eric Otogo-Castane (Gabon)
11 November 2017
15:00 UTC+2

Zambia	2–2	Cameroon
Daka 25'; Mwila 64'	Report (FIFA); Report (CAF)	Zambo Anguissa 30'; Yaya 90'

Levy Mwanawasa Stadium, Ndola
Attendance: 20,000
Referee: Rédouane Jiyed (Morocco)

=== Group C ===
Pos	Team	Pld	W	D	L	GF	GA	GD	Pts	Qualification	Morocco	Côte d'Ivoire	Gabon	Mali
1	Morocco	6	3	3	0	11	0	+11	12	Qualification to 2018 FIFA World Cup	—	0–0	3–0	6–0
2	Ivory Coast	6	2	2	2	7	5	+2	8		0–2	—	1–2	3–1
3	Gabon	6	1	3	2	2	7	−5	6		0–0	0–3	—	0–0
4	Mali	6	0	4	2	1	9	−8	4		0–0	0–0	0–0	—

Source: FIFA
Rules for classification: Qualification tiebreakers
8 October 2016
16:00 UTC+1

Gabon	0–0	Morocco
	Report (FIFA); Report (CAF)

Stade de Franceville, Franceville
Attendance: 18,000
Referee: Hamada Nampiandraza (Madagascar)
8 October 2016
18:00 UTC±0

Ivory Coast	3–1	Mali
Kodjia 26'; S. Coulibaly 31' (o.g.); Gervinho 34'	Report (FIFA); Report (CAF)	S. Yatabaré 18'

Stade Bouaké, Bouaké
Attendance: 22,000
Referee: Joshua Bondo (Botswana)

12 November 2016
18:30 UTC±0

Mali	0–0	Gabon
	Report (FIFA); Report (CAF)

Stade du 26 Mars, Bamako
Attendance: 25,000
Referee: Janny Sikazwe (Zambia)
12 November 2016
20:00 UTC±0

Morocco	0–0	Ivory Coast
	Report (FIFA); Report (CAF)

Stade de Marrakech, Marrakesh
Attendance: 40,000
Referee: Bernard Camille (Seychelles)

1 September 2017
21:00 UTC+1

Morocco	6–0	Mali
Ziyech 19' (pen.), 60'; Boutaïb 27'; Hakimi 72'; Fajr 80'; Mahi 88'	Report (FIFA); Report (CAF)

Prince Moulay Abdellah Stadium, Rabat
Attendance: 42,000
Referee: Sidi Alioum (Cameroon)
2 September 2017
17:00 UTC+1

Gabon	0–3	Ivory Coast
	Report (FIFA); Report (CAF)	Gradel 53'; Doumbia 77', 83'

Stade d'Angondjé, Libreville
Attendance: 23,000
Referee: Bamlak Tessema Weyesa (Ethiopia)

5 September 2017
17:30 UTC±0

Ivory Coast	1–2	Gabon
Cornet 58'	Report (FIFA); Report (CAF)	Méyé 20'; Lemina 30'

Stade Bouaké, Bouaké
Attendance: 12,948
Referee: Malang Diedhiou (Senegal)
5 September 2017
19:00 UTC±0

Mali	0–0	Morocco
	Report (FIFA); Report (CAF)

Stade du 26 Mars, Bamako
Attendance: 20,000
Referee: Hamada Nampiandraza (Madagascar)

6 October 2017
19:00 UTC±0

Mali	0–0	Ivory Coast
	Report (FIFA); Report (CAF)

Stade du 26 Mars, Bamako
Attendance: 8,960
Referee: Hélder Martins de Carvalho (Angola)
7 October 2017
20:00 UTC+1

Morocco	3–0	Gabon
Boutaïb 38', 56', 71'	Report (FIFA); Report (CAF)

Stade Mohammed V, Casablanca
Attendance: 45,000
Referee: Victor Gomes (South Africa)

11 November 2017
15:30 UTC+1

Gabon	0–0	Mali
	Report (FIFA); Report (CAF)

Stade de Franceville, Franceville
Attendance: 8,700
Referee: Gehad Grisha (Egypt)
11 November 2017
17:30 UTC±0

Ivory Coast	0–2	Morocco
	Report (FIFA); Report (CAF)	Dirar 24'; Benatia 30'

Stade Félix Houphouët-Boigny, Abidjan
Attendance: 32,000
Referee: Bakary Gassama (Gambia)

=== Group D ===
Pos	Team	Pld	W	D	L	GF	GA	GD	Pts	Qualification	Senegal	Burkina Faso	Cape Verde	South Africa
1	Senegal	6	4	2	0	10	3	+7	14	Qualification to 2018 FIFA World Cup	—	0–0	2–0	2–1
2	Burkina Faso	6	2	3	1	10	6	+4	9		2–2	—	4–0	1–1
3	Cape Verde	6	2	0	4	4	12	−8	6		0–2	0–2	—	2–1
4	South Africa	6	1	1	4	7	10	−3	4		0–2 (Note: FIFA ordered a replay of the original South Africa v Senegal match after the Court of Arbitration for Sport (CAS) upheld the lifetime ban of match referee Joseph Lamptey. Originally South Africa had defeated Senegal 2–1.)	3–1	1–2	—

Source: FIFA
Rules for classification: Qualification tiebreakers
Notes:
8 October 2016
18:00 UTC±0

Burkina Faso	1–1	South Africa
Diawara 89'	Report (FIFA); Report (CAF)	Furman 80'

Stade du 4 Août, Ouagadougou
Attendance: 35,000
Referee: Rédouane Jiyed (Morocco)
8 October 2016
20:00 UTC±0

Senegal	2–0	Cape Verde
Keita 24'; Sow 80'	Report (FIFA); Report (CAF)

Stade Léopold Sédar Senghor, Dakar
Attendance: 53,000
Referee: Youssef Essrayri (Tunisia)

12 November 2016
15:00 UTC+2

South Africa	Annulled (Note: On 6 September 2017, the Bureau for the FIFA World Cup Qualifiers annulled the result of the South Africa v Senegal match on 12 November 2016, and ordered that it be replayed within the November 2017 international window, which was confirmed by the Organising Committee for FIFA Competitions on 14 September 2017. Originally, South Africa had defeated Senegal 2–1, but match referee Joseph Lamptey was banned for life by the FIFA Disciplinary Committee on 20 March 2017 for unlawfully influencing the match after issuing a penalty for handball against Senegal: this decision was upheld by the FIFA Appeal Committee, and subsequently by the Court of Arbitration for Sport on 6 September 2017.)	Senegal
Hlatshwayo 42' (pen.); Serero 45'	Report (FIFA); Report (CAF)	N'Doye 75'

Peter Mokaba Stadium, Polokwane
Attendance: 26,179
Referee: Joseph Lamptey (Ghana)
12 November 2016
16:00 UTC−1

Cape Verde	0–2	Burkina Faso
	Report (FIFA); Report (CAF)	Dayo 2'; Nakoulma 28'

Estádio Nacional de Cabo Verde, Praia
Attendance: 5,000
Referee: Ali Lemghaifry (Mauritania)

1 September 2017
17:30 UTC−1

Cape Verde	2–1	South Africa
Rocha 33', 38' (pen.)	Report (FIFA); Report (CAF)	Rantie 14'

Estádio Nacional de Cabo Verde, Praia
Attendance: 4,000
Referee: Mehdi Abid Charef (Algeria)
2 September 2017
20:00 UTC±0

Senegal	0–0	Burkina Faso
	Report (FIFA); Report (CAF)

Stade Léopold Sédar Senghor, Dakar
Attendance: 42,901
Referee: Joshua Bondo (Botswana)

5 September 2017
19:00 UTC+2

South Africa	1–2	Cape Verde
Jali 89'	Report (FIFA); Report (CAF)	Rodrigues 51', 66'

Moses Mabhida Stadium, Durban
Attendance: 15,000
Referee: Ferdinand Udoh (Nigeria)
5 September 2017
18:00 UTC±0

Burkina Faso	2–2	Senegal
B. Traoré 8'; A. Traoré 88'	Report (FIFA); Report (CAF)	Sarr 26'; Mané 75'

Stade du 4 Août, Ouagadougou
Attendance: 35,000
Referee: Janny Sikazwe (Zambia)

7 October 2017
15:00 UTC+2

South Africa	3–1	Burkina Faso
Tau 2'; Zwane 34'; Vilakazi 45+2'	Report (FIFA); Report (CAF)	A. Traoré 86'

FNB Stadium, Johannesburg
Attendance: 10,500
Referee: Sidi Alioum (Cameroon)
7 October 2017
16:30 UTC−1

Cape Verde	0–2	Senegal
	Report (FIFA); Report (CAF)	Sakho 82'; N'Doye 90+2'

Estádio Nacional de Cabo Verde, Praia
Attendance: 14,000
Referee: Gehad Grisha (Egypt)

10 November 2017
19:00 UTC+2

South Africa	0–2	Senegal
	Report (FIFA); Report (CAF)	Sakho 11'; Mkhize 38' (o.g.)

Peter Mokaba Stadium, Polokwane
Attendance: 40,000
Referee: Janny Sikazwe (Zambia)

14 November 2017
19:30 UTC±0

Burkina Faso	4–0	Cape Verde
Nakoulma 45', 57', 62'; Diawara 90+3'	Report (FIFA); Report (CAF)

Stade du 4 Août, Ouagadougou
Attendance: 7,000
Referee: Youssef Essrayri (Tunisia)
14 November 2017
19:30 UTC±0

Senegal	2–1	South Africa
Nguette 55'; Mbodji 90+2'	Report (FIFA); Report (CAF)	Tau 63'

Stade Léopold Sédar Senghor, Dakar
Attendance: 50,000
Referee: Bamlak Tessema Weyesa (Ethiopia)

=== Group E ===
Pos	Team	Pld	W	D	L	GF	GA	GD	Pts	Qualification	Egypt	Uganda	Ghana	Republic of the Congo
1	Egypt	6	4	1	1	8	4	+4	13	Qualification to 2018 FIFA World Cup	—	1–0	2–0	2–1
2	Uganda	6	2	3	1	3	2	+1	9		1–0	—	0–0	1–0
3	Ghana	6	1	4	1	7	5	+2	7		1–1	0–0	—	1–1
4	Congo	6	0	2	4	5	12	−7	2		1–2	1–1	1–5	—

Source: FIFA
Rules for classification: Qualification tiebreakers
7 October 2016
15:30 UTC±0

Ghana	0–0	Uganda
	Report (FIFA); Report (CAF)

Tamale Stadium, Tamale
Attendance: 6,500
Referee: El Fadil Mohamed (Sudan)
9 October 2016
15:30 UTC+1

Congo	1–2	Egypt
Doré 24'	Report (FIFA); Report (CAF)	M. Salah 41'; El Said 58'

Stade Municipal de Kintélé, Brazzaville
Attendance: 27,000
Referee: Denis Dembélé (Ivory Coast)

12 November 2016
16:00 UTC+3

Uganda	1–0	Congo
Miya 17'	Report (FIFA); Report (CAF)

Mandela National Stadium, Kampala
Attendance: 25,000
Referee: Mehdi Abid Charef (Algeria)
13 November 2016
18:00 UTC+2

Egypt	2–0	Ghana
M. Salah 42' (pen.); El Said 85'	Report (FIFA); Report (CAF)

Borg El Arab Stadium, Alexandria
Attendance: 70,000
Referee: Eric Otogo-Castane (Gabon)

31 August 2017
16:00 UTC+3

Uganda	1–0	Egypt
Okwi 51'	Report (FIFA); Report (CAF)

Mandela National Stadium, Kampala
Attendance: 30,000
Referee: Ali Lemghaifry (Mauritania)
1 September 2017
15:30 UTC±0

Ghana	1–1	Congo
Partey 86'	Report (FIFA); Report (CAF)	Bifouma 18'

Baba Yara Stadium, Kumasi
Attendance: 30,000
Referee: Youssef Essrayri (Tunisia)

5 September 2017
15:30 UTC+1

Congo	1–5	Ghana
Illoy-Ayyet 43'	Report (FIFA); Report (CAF)	Boakye 22', 45+2', 84'; Partey 26', 68'

Stade Municipal de Kintélé, Brazzaville
Attendance: 14,379
Referee: Rédouane Jiyed (Morocco)
5 September 2017
20:00 UTC+2

Egypt	1–0	Uganda
Salah 6'	Report (FIFA); Report (CAF)

Borg El Arab Stadium, Alexandria
Attendance: 60,000
Referee: Victor Gomes (South Africa)

7 October 2017
16:00 UTC+3

Uganda	0–0	Ghana
	Report (FIFA); Report (CAF)

Mandela National Stadium, Kampala
Attendance: 35,000
Referee: Daniel Bennett (South Africa)
8 October 2017
16:00 UTC+2

Egypt	2–1	Congo
Salah 62', 90+4' (pen.)	Report (FIFA); Report (CAF)	Bouka Moutou 87'

Borg El Arab Stadium, Alexandria
Attendance: 86,000
Referee: Bakary Gassama (Gambia)

12 November 2017
15:30 UTC+1

Congo	1–1	Uganda
Baudry 10'	Report (FIFA); Report (CAF)	Karisa 11'

Stade Alphonse Massemba-Débat, Brazzaville
Attendance: 1,002
Referee: El Fadil Mohamed (Sudan)
12 November 2017
15:30 UTC±0

Ghana	1–1	Egypt
Gyasi 63'	Report (FIFA); Report (CAF)	Shikabala 61'

Cape Coast Stadium, Cape Coast
Attendance: 14,000
Referee: Malang Diedhiou (Senegal)

== Goalscorers ==
There were 144 goals scored in 61 matches, for an average of 2.36 goals per match.

5 goals

- (Egypt) Mohamed Salah

4 goals

- (Burkina Faso) Préjuce Nakoulma
- (Morocco) Khalid Boutaïb

3 goals

- (Ghana) Richmond Boakye
- (Ghana) Thomas Partey
- (Nigeria) Victor Moses
- (Tunisia) Youssef Msakni
- (Zambia) Brian Mwila

2 goals

- (Algeria) Yacine Brahimi
- (Burkina Faso) Banou Diawara
- (Burkina Faso) Alain Traoré
- (Cameroon) Vincent Aboubakar
- (Cape Verde) Nuno Rocha
- (Cape Verde) Garry Rodrigues
- (Ivory Coast) Seydou Doumbia
- (Democratic Republic of the Congo) Cédric Bakambu
- (Democratic Republic of the Congo) Jonathan Bolingi
- (Democratic Republic of the Congo) Neeskens Kebano
- (Democratic Republic of the Congo) Dieumerci Mbokani
- (Democratic Republic of the Congo) Ndombe Mubele
- (Egypt) Abdallah El Said
- (Guinea) Naby Keïta
- (Morocco) Hakim Ziyech
- (Nigeria) Kelechi Iheanacho
- (Nigeria) Alex Iwobi
- (Nigeria) John Obi Mikel
- (Senegal) Cheikh N'Doye
- (Senegal) Diafra Sakho
- (South Africa) Percy Tau
- (Zambia) Collins Mbesuma
- (Zambia) Patson Daka

1 goal

- (Algeria) Nabil Bentaleb
- (Algeria) Hillal Soudani
- (Burkina Faso) Issoufou Dayo
- (Burkina Faso) Bertrand Traoré
- (Cameroon) André-Frank Zambo Anguissa
- (Cameroon) Benjamin Moukandjo
- (Cameroon) Clinton N'Jie
- (Cameroon) Franck Pangop
- (Cameroon) Banana Yaya
- (Ivory Coast) Maxwel Cornet
- (Ivory Coast) Gervinho
- (Ivory Coast) Max Gradel
- (Ivory Coast) Jonathan Kodjia
- (Republic of the Congo) Marvin Baudry
- (Republic of the Congo) Thievy Bifouma
- (Republic of the Congo) Arnold Bouka Moutou
- (Republic of the Congo) Férébory Doré
- (Republic of the Congo) Vladis-Emmerson Illoy-Ayyet
- (Democratic Republic of the Congo) Yannick Bolasie
- (Democratic Republic of the Congo) Chancel Mbemba
- (Democratic Republic of the Congo) Paul-José M'Poku
- (Egypt) Shikabala
- (Gabon) Mario Lemina
- (Gabon) Axel Méyé
- (Ghana) Edwin Gyasi
- (Guinea) Alkhaly Bangoura
- (Guinea) Demba Camara
- (Guinea) Keita Karamokoba
- (Guinea) Seydouba Soumah
- (Libya) Hamdou Elhouni
- (Libya) Ali Elmusrati
- (Libya) Motasem Sabbou
- (Libya) Akram Zuway
- (Mali) Sambou Yatabaré
- (Morocco) Fayçal Fajr
- (Morocco) Medhi Benatia
- (Morocco) Nabil Dirar
- (Morocco) Achraf Hakimi
- (Morocco) Mimoun Mahi
- (Nigeria) Odion Ighalo
- (Nigeria) John Ogu
- (Nigeria) Moses Simon
- (Senegal) Keita Baldé
- (Senegal) Sadio Mané
- (Senegal) Kara Mbodji
- (Senegal) Opa Nguette
- (Senegal) Ismaïla Sarr
- (Senegal) Moussa Sow
- (South Africa) Dean Furman
- (South Africa) Thulani Hlatshwayo
- (South Africa) Andile Jali
- (South Africa) Tokelo Rantie
- (South Africa) Thulani Serero
- (South Africa) Sibusiso Vilakazi
- (South Africa) Themba Zwane
- (Tunisia) Aymen Abdennour
- (Tunisia) Anice Badri
- (Tunisia) Mohamed Ben Amor
- (Tunisia) Änis Ben-Hatira
- (Tunisia) Ghailene Chaalali
- (Tunisia) Wahbi Khazri
- (Tunisia) Yassine Meriah
- (Uganda) Milton Karisa
- (Uganda) Farouk Miya
- (Uganda) Emmanuel Okwi
- (Zambia) Enock Mwepu

1 own goal

- (Democratic Republic of the Congo) Wilfred Moke (against Tunisia)
- (Guinea) Ousmane Sidibé (against DR Congo)
- (Mali) Salif Coulibaly (against Ivory Coast)
- (South Africa) Thamsanqa Mkhize (against Senegal)
