= Josemar Machaísse =

Mozambican footballer

Josemar
Personal information
- Full name: Josemar Tiago Machaísse
- Date of birth: 7 August 1987 (age 39)
- Place of birth: Maputo, Mozambique
- Height: 1.60 m (5 ft 3 in)
- Position: Midfielder

Senior career*
Years	Team	Apps	(Gls)
2006–2009	Desportivo Maputo		
2009–2012	Costa do Sol		
2012	Maxaquene		
2012–2013	Liga Muçulmana		
2014–2015	Bravos do Maquis	19	(3)
2016	Costa do Sol		
2017	Bravos do Maquis	6	(0)
2018–2019	Ferroviário de Nampula		

International career
2008–2015	Mozambique	47	(6)
- * Club domestic league appearances and goals

Josemar Tiago Machaísse (born 7 August 1987) is a Mozambican former professional footballer who played as a midfielder. He is a former member of Mozambique national team.

== Career statistics ==
=== International ===
Appearances and goals by national team and year
National team	Year	Apps	Goals
Mozambique	2008	5	0
Mozambique	2009	9	1
Mozambique	2010	8	1
Mozambique	2011	2	0
Mozambique	2012	1	0
Mozambique	2013	10	1
Mozambique	2014	14	3
Mozambique	2015	1	0
Total		50	6

Scores and results list Mozambique's goal tally first, score column indicates score after each Machaísse goal.

List of international goals scored by Josemar Machaísse
No.	Date	Venue	Opponent	Score	Result	Competition	Ref.
1	25 October 2009	Rufaro Stadium, Harare, Zimbabwe	Malawi	1–0	1–0	2009 COSAFA Cup	
2	9 October 2010	Stade Said Mohamed Cheikh, Mitsamiouli, Comoros	Comoros	1–0	1–0	2012 Africa Cup of Nations qualification	
3	6 July 2013	Civo Stadium, Lilongwe, Malawi	Malawi	1–0	1–0	Friendly	
4	19 January 2014	Athlone Stadium, Cape Town, South Africa	Mali	1–0	1–2	2014 African Nations Championship	
5	18 May 2014	Estádio do Zimpeto, Maputo, Mozambique	South Sudan	1–0	5–0	2015 Africa Cup of Nations qualification	
6	3 August 2014	Estádio do Zimpeto, Maputo, Mozambique	Tanzania	1–0	2–1	2015 Africa Cup of Nations qualification	
