= Demba Sow =

Mauritanian footballer (born 1993)

Personal information
- Full name: Demba Sow
- Date of birth: 3 July 1993 (age 33)
- Place of birth: France
- Position: Defender

Team information
- Current team: ESM Gonfreville

Senior career*
Years	Team	Apps	(Gls)
2011–2014	Le Havre II	21	(2)
2014–	ESM Gonfreville	1	(0)

International career^{‡}
2013–	Mauritania	2	(1)
- * Club domestic league appearances and goals as of 20:49, 5 January 2015 (UTC) ‡ National team caps and goals as of 20:49, 5 January 2015 (UTC)

Demba Sow (born 3 July 1993) is a Mauritanian professional footballer who currently plays as a defender for ESM Gonfreville.

== International career ==
=== International goals ===
Scores and results list Mauritania's goal tally first.

Goal	Date	Venue	Opponent	Score	Result	Competition
1.	20 April 2014	Stade George V, Curepipe, Mauritius	Mauritius	1–0	2–0	2015 Africa Cup of Nations qualification
