= 2015 Africa Cup of Nations qualification Group E =

Football tournament qualification stage

Group E of the 2015 Africa Cup of Nations qualification tournament was one of the seven groups to decide the teams which qualified for the 2015 Africa Cup of Nations finals tournament. Group E consisted of four teams: Ghana, Guinea, Uganda, and Togo, who played against each other home-and-away in a round-robin format.

== Standings ==
Team	Pld	W	D	L	GF	GA	GD	Pts	GHA	GUI	UGA	TOG
Ghana	6	3	2	1	11	7	+4	11		3–1	1–1	3–1
Guinea	6	3	1	2	10	8	+2	10	1–1		2–0	2–1
Uganda	6	2	1	3	4	5	−1	7	1–0	2–0		0–1
Togo	6	2	0	4	7	12	−5	6	2–3	1–4	1–0	

== Matches ==
5 September 2014
20:00 UTC+1

Guinea	2–1	Togo
Soumah 11' (pen.); Id. Sylla 44'	Report	J. Ayité 56'

Stade Mohamed V, Casablanca (Morocco) (Note: Guinea played their group stage home matches outside of the country due to the 2014 West Africa Ebola virus outbreak.)
Referee: Rédouane Jiyed (Morocco)
6 September 2014
16:00 UTC±0

Ghana	1–1	Uganda
A. Ayew 51' (pen.)	Report	Mawejje 45'

Baba Yara Stadium, Kumasi
Referee: Mohamed Said Kordi (Tunisia)

10 September 2014
16:00 UTC±0

Togo	2–3	Ghana
F. Ayité 12'; Adebayor 75'	Report	Gyan 23'; Agyemang-Badu 34'; Atsu 85'

Stade de Kégué, Lomé
Referee: Mohamed Benouza (Algeria)
10 September 2014
19:30 UTC+3

Uganda	2–0	Guinea
Massa 20', 41'	Report

Mandela National Stadium, Kampala
Referee: Tessema Bamlak (Ethiopia)

11 October 2014
16:00 UTC+3

Uganda	0–1	Togo
	Report	Kokou 29'

Mandela National Stadium, Kampala
Referee: Davies Omweno (Kenya)
11 October 2014
20:00 UTC+1

Guinea	1–1	Ghana
Traoré 80'	Report	Gyan 26'

Stade Mohamed V, Casablanca (Morocco)
Referee: Mohamed Ragab Omar (Libya)

15 October 2014
15:00 UTC±0

Togo	1–0	Uganda
Akakpo 70'	Report

Stade de Kégué, Lomé
Referee: Hagi Wiish (Somalia)
15 October 2014
16:00 UTC±0

Ghana	3–1	Guinea
Gyan 14'; A. Ayew 57' (pen.); Agyemang-Badu 90'	Report	M. Yattara 34'

Tamale Stadium, Tamale
Referee: Bernard Camille (Seychelles)

15 November 2014
16:00 UTC+3

Uganda	1–0	Ghana
Kabugo 10'	Report

Mandela National Stadium, Kampala
Referee: El Fadil Mohamed (Sudan)
15 November 2014
15:30 UTC±0

Togo	1–4	Guinea
Adebayor 70' (pen.)	Report	Id. Sylla 17'; Soumah 39', 60', 66'

Stade de Kégué, Lomé
Referee: Slim Jedidi (Tunisia)

19 November 2014
16:00 UTC±0

Ghana	3–1	Togo
Waris 22'; Wakaso 26'; Ouro-Akoriko 78' (o.g.)	Report	Segbefia 47'

Tamale Stadium, Tamale
Referee: Bakary Gassama (Gambia)
19 November 2014
16:00 UTC±0

Guinea	2–0	Uganda
Traoré 23'; Soumah 61' (pen.)	Report

Stade Mohamed V, Casablanca (Morocco)
Referee: Malang Diedhiou (Senegal)
