= Joel Mogorosi =

Motswana footballer (born 1984)

Personal information
- Full name: Otlogetswe Joel Mogorosi
- Date of birth: August 2, 1984 (age 42)
- Place of birth: Gaborone, Botswana
- Height: 1.82 m (6 ft 0 in)
- Position: Forward

Team information
- Current team: Gaborone United
- Number: 17

Senior career*
Years	Team	Apps	(Gls)
2004–2006	BMC		
2006	Township Rollers		
2006–2007	AEP Paphos	10	(1)
2007–2008	APOP Kinyras Peyias	2	(0)
2008–2010	Township Rollers		
2010–2012	Mochudi Centre Chiefs		
2012–2014	Bloemfontein Celtic	56	(10)
2014–2019	Township Rollers		
2019–	Gaborone United		

International career^{‡}
2005–2019	Botswana	97	(16)
- * Club domestic league appearances and goals as of 13 November 2022 ‡ National team caps and goals as of 13 November 2022

Joel Mogorosi (born August 2, 1984) is a Motswana footballer who currently plays as a striker for Botswana Premier League side Gaborone United and the Botswana national team. He is noted for his fast play and quick feet. Mogorosi scored his first international goal by volleying the ball outside the box against Togo on 4 September 2010. His second international goal was against Sweden on 19 January 2011.

It was confirmed that South African club Bloemfontein Celtic finally signed Mogorosi on a three-year deal after the two football clubs reached an agreement in July 2012.

== International career ==
Mogorosi officially made his international debut for Botswana on 31 May 2008 against Madagascar in a FIFA World Cup qualifying match, the match ended as a goalless draw.

He scored his first goal for Botswana against Togo in an Africa Cup of Nations qualifying match, Botswana won the match 2–1.

He scored his first double in a Friendly match against South Sudan, Botswana won the match 3–0.

=== International goals ===
Scores and results list Botswana's goal tally first.

#	Date	Venue	Opponent	Score	Result	Competition
1.	4 September 2010	National Stadium, Gaborone, Botswana	Togo	1–0	2–1	2010 Africa Cup of Nations qualification
2.	19 January 2011	Cape Town Stadium, Cape Town, South Africa	Sweden	1–1	1–2	Friendly
3.	23 May 2012	National Stadium, Gaborone, Botswana	Lesotho	1–0	3–0	Friendly
4.	5 March 2014	National Stadium, Gaborone, Botswana	South Sudan	1–0	3–0	Friendly
5.	5 March 2014	National Stadium, Gaborone, Botswana	South Sudan	2–0	3–0	Friendly
6.	1 June 2014	Lobatse Stadium, Lobatse, Botswana	Burundi	1–0	1–0	2015 Africa Cup of Nations qualification
7.	6 September 2014	Stade Mustapha Ben Jannet, Monastir, Tunisia	Tunisia	1–0	1–2	2015 Africa Cup of Nations qualification
8.	5 September 2015	Francistown Stadium, Francistown, Botswana	Burkina Faso	1–0	1–0	2017 Africa Cup of Nations qualification
9.	30 September 2015	National Stadium, Gaborone, Botswana	Ethiopia	?	2–3	Friendly
10.	30 September 2015	National Stadium, Gaborone, Botswana	Ethiopia	?	2–3	Friendly
11.	10 October 2015	Cicero Stadium, Asmara, Eritrea	Eritrea	2–0	2–0	2018 FIFA World Cup qualification
12.	13 October 2015	Francistown Stadium, Francistown, Botswana	Eritrea	2–1	3–1	2018 FIFA World Cup qualification
13.	14 November 2015	Francistown Stadium, Francistown, Botswana	Mali	2–1	2–1	2018 FIFA World Cup qualification
14.	27 March 2016	Francistown Stadium, Francistown, Botswana	Comoros	2–1	2–1	2017 Africa Cup of Nations qualification
15.	11 May 2019	Stade Linité, Victoria, Seychelles	Eritrea	2–1	3–1	2020 African Nations Championship qualification
16.	5 June 2019	Moses Mabhida Stadium, Durban, South Africa	Lesotho	1–0	2–1	2019 COSAFA Cup
