= Geofrey Massa =

Ugandan footballer (born 1986)

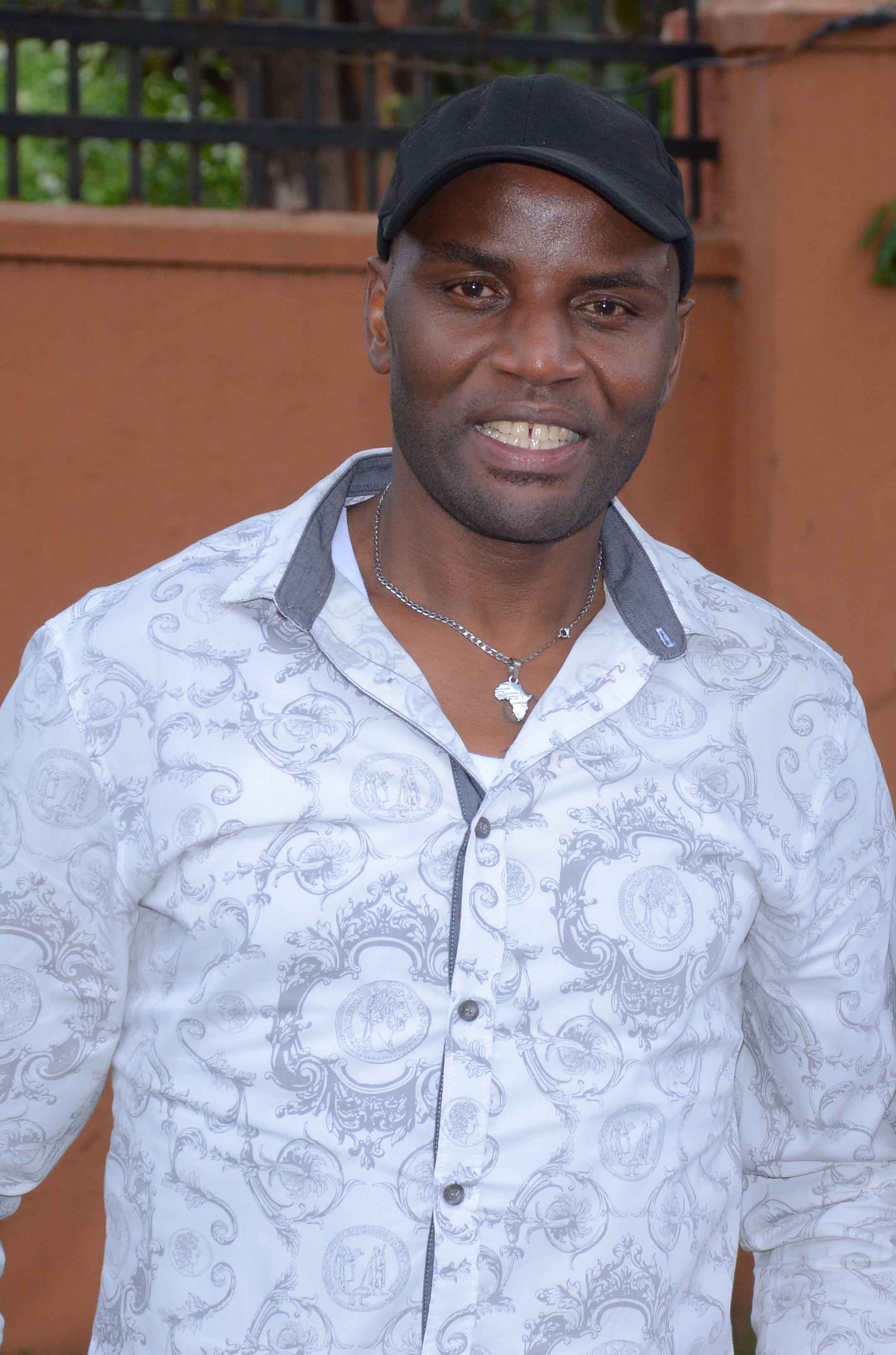

Personal information
- Full name: Geofrey Massa
- Date of birth: 19 February 1986 (age 40)
- Place of birth: Jinja, Uganda
- Height: 1.80 m (5 ft 11 in)
- Position: Forward

Youth career
- Nile Academy Jinja

Senior career*
Years	Team	Apps	(Gls)
2004–2005	Police FC		
2005–2007	Al-Masry		
2007–2008	El-Shams	5	(4)
2008–2009	Jomo Cosmos	14	(1)
2009–2011	Itesalat		
2011–2013	Yenicami Ağdelen	41	(49)
2013–2015	University of Pretoria	49	(13)
2015–2016	Bloemfontein Celtic	13	(2)
2016–2017	Baroka		(0)
2017	Küçük Kaymaklı	48	(40)

International career
2005–2017	Uganda	69	(22)
- * Club domestic league appearances and goals

Geofrey Massa (born 19 February 1986) is a former Ugandan professional footballer who played as a forward.

== Club career ==
Born in Jinja, Massa began his career in 2004 with Police FC in the Ugandan Premier League before moving to Egypt side Al-Masry Club in 2005. He played three years in Egypt before moving in 2008 to South African club Jomo Cosmos, for which he played 14 games and scored one goal. In 2008, he left the team to return to Egypt and signed a contract with Itesalat. Massa joined on 14 September 2011 to Telsim Super League club Yenicami Ağdelen SK. On 21 August 2013, he signed a deal with the South African side University of Pretoria F.C.

== International career ==
Massa has made several appearances for the Uganda national football team, his first coming in 2005.

=== International goals ===
Scores and results list Uganda's goal tally first.

No	Date	Venue	Opponent	Score	Result	Competition
1.	1 December 2005	Amahoro Stadium, Kigali, Rwanda	Somalia	1–0	7–0	2005 CECAFA Cup
2.	1 December 2005	Amahoro Stadium, Kigali, Rwanda	Somalia	3–0	7–0	2005 CECAFA Cup
3.	3 December 2005	Amahoro Stadium, Kigali, Rwanda	Sudan	1–0	3–0	2005 CECAFA Cup
4.	29 December 2005	Cairo International Stadium, Cairo, Egypt	Ecuador	1–1	2–1	2005 LG Cup
5.	2 September 2006	Mandela National Stadium, Kampala, Uganda	Lesotho	1–0	3–0	2008 Africa Cup of Nations qualification
6.	2 September 2006	Mandela National Stadium, Kampala, Uganda	Lesotho	2–0	3–0	2008 Africa Cup of Nations qualification
7.	12 October 2008	Mandela National Stadium, Kampala, Uganda	Benin	1–1	2–1	2010 FIFA World Cup qualification
8.	12 October 2008	Mandela National Stadium, Kampala, Uganda	Benin	2–1	2–1	2010 FIFA World Cup qualification
9.	7 January 2009	Nakivubo Stadium, Kampala, Uganda	Somalia	4–0	4–0	2008 CECAFA Cup
10.	7 January 2009	Mandela National Stadium, Kampala, Uganda	Burundi	4–0	5–0	2008 CECAFA Cup
11.	2 December 2009	Mumias Sports Complex, Mumias, Kenya	Burundi	1–0	2–0	2009 CECAFA Cup
12.	4 June 2011	Mandela National Stadium, Kampala, Uganda	Guinea-Bissau	2–0	2–0	2012 Africa Cup of Nations qualification
13.	16 June 2012	Mandela National Stadium, Kampala, Uganda	Congo	3–0	4–0	2013 Africa Cup of Nations qualification
14.	13 October 2012	Mandela National Stadium, Kampala, Uganda	Zambia	1–0	1–0 (8–9 p)	2013 Africa Cup of Nations qualification
15.	31 May 2014	Mandela National Stadium, Kampala, Uganda	Madagascar	1–0	1–0	2015 Africa Cup of Nations qualification
16.	19 July 2014	Mandela National Stadium, Kampala, Uganda	Mauritania	2–0	2–0	2015 Africa Cup of Nations qualification
17.	10 September 2014	Mandela National Stadium, Kampala, Uganda	Guinea	1–0	2–0	2015 Africa Cup of Nations qualification
18.	10 September 2014	Mandela National Stadium, Kampala, Uganda	Guinea	2–0	2–0	2015 Africa Cup of Nations qualification
19.	9 November 2014	Mandela National Stadium, Kampala, Uganda	Ethiopia	1–0	3–0	Friendly
20.	13 June 2014	Mandela National Stadium, Kampala, Uganda	Botswana	1–0	2–0	2017 Africa Cup of Nations qualification
21.	9 November 2014	Mandela National Stadium, Kampala, Uganda	Togo	1–0	3–0	2018 FIFA World Cup qualification
22.	8 January 2017	Armed Forces Stadium, Abu Dhabi, United Arab Emirates	Slovakia	3–1	3–1	Friendly
