= Demba Camara =

Guinean footballer (born 1994)

Aboubacar Demba Camara
Personal information
- Full name: Aboubacar Demba Camara
- Date of birth: 7 November 1994 (age 32)
- Place of birth: Conakry, Guinea
- Height: 1.83 m (6 ft 0 in)
- Position: Striker

Youth career
- –2013: Satellite
- 2013: Ajaccio

Senior career*
Years	Team	Apps	(Gls)
2013–2014	Ajaccio	20	(2)
2014–2015	Gaziantepspor	18	(3)
2016–2017	Paris FC	33	(10)
2017–2018	Anorthosis Famagusta	24	(6)
2018–2019	Troyes	4	(1)
2019	→ Red Star (loan)	9	(1)
2019–2020	Hapoel Tel Aviv	11	(2)
2020	Petaling Jaya City	3	(1)
2020–2021	Mouloudia Oujda	20	(8)
2021–2022	Maghreb de Fès	11	(1)
2022	Mouloudia Oujda	2	(0)
2022–2023	Al-Nahda		
2023–2024	Tuwaiq		
2024–2025	Al Dhaid		

International career^{‡}
2011–	Guinea	12	(3)
- * Club domestic league appearances and goals as of 13:22, 1 August 2021 (UTC) ‡ National team caps and goals as of 00:33, 1 February 2019 (UTC)

Aboubacar Demba Camara (born 7 November 1994) is a Guinean professional footballer who plays as a striker.

== Career ==
Camara made his Ligue 1 debut at AC Ajaccio on 21 September 2013 against Stade Rennais in a 2–0 away defeat. He replaced Johan Cavalli as a substitute after 69 minutes. After the end of the 2013–14 season, he moved to Turkey for Gaziantepspor in the summer of 2014, penning a four-year contract.

On 31 January 2019, the last day of the 2018–19 winter transfer window, Camara joined Red Star F.C. on loan from Troyes AC. Prior to the loan agreement, his Troyes contract was extended until 2021.

In the summer of 2019, he moved to Hapoel Tel Aviv, and in 2020, moved to Petaling Jaya City FC in Malaysia. He is now a free agent with his only team the Guinea national team.

On 6 July 2023, Camara joined Saudi Second Division side Tuwaiq.

== Career statistics ==
=== International goals ===
Scores and results list Guinea's goal tally first.

No	Date	Venue	Opponent	Score	Result	Competition
1.	28 March 2017	Edmond Machtens Stadium, Brussels, Belgium	Cameroon	1–0	2–1	Friendly
2.	6 June 2017	Mustapha Tchaker Stadium, Blida, Algeria	Algeria	1–1	1–2	Friendly
3.	31 August 2017	Stade du 28 Septembre, Conakry, Guinea	Libya	2–0	3–2	2018 FIFA World Cup qualification
