= Kuca (footballer) =

Cape Verdean footballer (born 1989)

Personal information
- Full name: Jaílton Alves Miranda
- Date of birth: 2 August 1989 (age 37)
- Place of birth: Praia, Cape Verde
- Height: 1.81 m (5 ft 11 1/2 in)
- Position: Forward

Team information
- Current team: Marinhense
- Number: 7

Senior career*
Years	Team	Apps	(Gls)
2007–2009	Bairro		
2009–2010	Boavista (CPV)		
2010–2012	Mirandela	41	(11)
2012–2014	Chaves	79	(33)
2014–2015	Estoril	15	(5)
2015–2016	Karabükspor	2	(0)
2015–2016	→ Belenenses (loan)	14	(1)
2016	→ Rio Ave (loan)	12	(2)
2016–2017	Arouca	25	(6)
2017–2018	Boavista	27	(3)
2018–2019	Hermannstadt	0	(0)
2019	Feirense	4	(0)
2020–2022	União Leiria	18	(3)
2022–	Marinhense	64	(18)

International career^{‡}
2009–	Cape Verde	19	(3)
- * Club domestic league appearances and goals as of 13 April 2025 ‡ National team caps and goals as of 30 March 2021

Jaílton Alves Miranda (born 2 August 1989), known as Kuca, is a Cape Verdean professional footballer who plays as a forward for Portuguese club Marinhense and the Cape Verde national team.

== Club career ==
Born in Praia, Kuca played for AD Bairro and Boavista FC in his country. He moved to Portugal in 2010, signing for lowly SC Mirandela and scoring four goals in 27 games in his first season to help the club promote to the third division.

Early into the 2012 January transfer window, Kuca joined G.D. Chaves. He achieved promotion to the Segunda Liga at the end of 2012–13, making his debut as a professional on 11 August 2013 and scoring the only goal of the away match against C.D. Santa Clara. He added a further 11 until the end of the campaign, as his team comfortably avoided relegation with an eighth-place finish; alongside compatriot Rambé, he was chosen by readers of daily newspaper O Jogo for the team of players competing in that level for the past 12 months.

Kuca moved to Primeira Liga side G.D. Estoril Praia on 26 June 2014. His maiden appearance in the competition took place on 18 August, and he netted in a 1–1 draw at F.C. Arouca.

On 12 January 2015, Kuca signed a three-and-a-half-year contract with Kardemir Karabükspor in the Turkish Süper Lig. In the summer, however, he returned to Portugal, being loaned to C.F. Os Belenenses. The following three seasons, he represented Rio Ave FC (still owned by Kardemir), Arouca and Boavista FC.

In October 2018, Kuca moved to the Romanian Liga I with FC Hermannstadt, alongside former Rio Ave teammate Pedro Moreira. He made his competitive debut on the 30th, coming on as a late substitute in a Cupa României match against FC Voluntari and scoring the final 3–0 which qualified to the quarter-finals.

== International career ==
Kuca earned his first cap for Cape Verde on 28 March 2009, in a 5–0 friendly win over Equatorial Guinea. He scored his first goal on 15 November 2014, contributing to a 3–1 home victory against Niger in the 2015 Africa Cup of Nations qualifiers.

Kuca was summoned by manager Rui Águas for the finals in Equatorial Guinea, featuring in all three group stage fixtures as the Blue Sharks were eliminated at that stage with three draws.

=== International goals ===
As of 15 November 2014 (Cape Verde score listed first, score column indicates score after each Kuca goal)

Goal	Date	Venue	Opponent	Score	Result	Competition
1.	15 November 2014	Estádio Nacional, Praia, Cape Verde	Niger	1–0	3–1	2015 Africa Cup of Nations qualification
2.	10 January 2015	Stade Léopold Sédar Senghor, Dakar, Senegal	Congo	3–2	3–2	Friendly
3.	26 March 2021	Estádio Nacional, Praia, Cape Verde	Cameroon	1–1	3–1	2021 Africa Cup of Nations qualification
