= 2015 Africa Cup of Nations qualification Group F =

Football tournament qualification stage

Group F of the 2015 Africa Cup of Nations qualification tournament was one of the seven groups to decide the teams which qualified for the 2015 Africa Cup of Nations finals tournament. Group F consisted of four teams: Cape Verde, Zambia, Mozambique, and Niger, who played against each other home-and-away in a round-robin format.

== Standings ==
Team	Pld	W	D	L	GF	GA	GD	Pts	CPV	ZAM	MOZ	NIG
Cape Verde	6	4	0	2	9	6	+3	12		2–1	1–0	3–1
Zambia	6	3	2	1	6	2	+4	11	1–0		0–0	3–0
Mozambique	6	1	3	2	4	4	0	6	2–0	0–1		1–1
Niger	6	0	3	3	4	11	−7	3	1–3	0–0	1–1	

== Matches ==
6 September 2014
15:00 UTC+2

Zambia	0–0	Mozambique
	Report

Levy Mwanawasa Stadium, Ndola
Referee: Thierry Nkurunziza (Burundi)
6 September 2014
16:30 UTC+1

Niger	1–3	Cape Verde
Maâzou 35'	Report	Rodrigues 4'; Fortes 15'; Zé Luís 25'

Stade Général Seyni Kountché, Niamey
Referee: Gehad Grisha (Egypt)

10 September 2014
18:00 UTC+2

Mozambique	1–1	Niger
Domingues 5' (pen.)	Report	Cissé 26'

Estádio do Zimpeto, Maputo
Referee: Hagi Wiish (Somalia)
10 September 2014
16:00 UTC−1

Cape Verde	2–1	Zambia
Zé Luís 33'; Mendes 77'	Report	Mulenga 56'

Estádio Nacional de Cabo Verde, Praia
Referee: Malang Diedhiou (Senegal)

11 October 2014
15:30 UTC+2

Mozambique	2–0	Cape Verde
Kito 44'; Reginaldo 65'	Report

Estádio da Machava, Matola
Referee: Mohamed Farouk Mahmoud (Egypt)
11 October 2014
16:00 UTC+1

Niger	0–0	Zambia
	Report

Stade Général Seyni Kountché, Niamey
Referee: Hudu Munyemana (Rwanda)

15 October 2014
18:00 UTC+2

Zambia	3–0	Niger
Kalaba 57'; Mayuka 73'; Mweene 87' (pen.)	Report

Levy Mwanawasa Stadium, Ndola
Referee: Juste Ephrem Zio (Burkina Faso)
15 October 2014
16:30 UTC−1

Cape Verde	1–0	Mozambique
Héldon 79'	Report

Estádio Nacional de Cabo Verde, Praia
Referee: Mahamadou Keita (Mali)

15 November 2014
16:00 UTC+2

Mozambique	0–1	Zambia
	Report	Singuluma 67'

Estádio do Zimpeto, Maputo
Referee: Eric Otogo-Castane (Gabon)
15 November 2014
16:00 UTC−1

Cape Verde	3–1	Niger
Kuca 68'; Héldon 90'; Tavares 90+2'	Report	Yacouba 70'

Estádio Nacional de Cabo Verde, Praia
Referee: Denis Dembélé (Ivory Coast)

19 November 2014
18:00 UTC+2

Zambia	1–0	Cape Verde
Kampamba 78'	Report

Levy Mwanawasa Stadium, Ndola
Referee: Bernard Camille (Seychelles)
19 November 2014
17:00 UTC+1

Niger	1–1	Mozambique
Yacouba 83'	Report	Diogo 69'

Stade Général Seyni Kountché, Niamey
Referee: Victor Gomes (South Africa)
