= 2015 Africa Cup of Nations qualification Group G =

Football tournament qualification stage

Group G of the 2015 Africa Cup of Nations qualification tournament was one of the seven groups to decide the teams which qualified for the 2015 Africa Cup of Nations finals tournament. Group G consisted of four teams: Tunisia, Senegal, Egypt, and Botswana, who played against each other home-and-away in a round-robin format.

== Standings ==
Team	Pld	W	D	L	GF	GA	GD	Pts	TUN	SEN	EGY	BOT
Tunisia	6	4	2	0	6	2	+4	14		1–0	2–1	2–1
Senegal	6	4	1	1	8	1	+7	13	0–0		2–0	3–0
Egypt	6	2	0	4	5	6	−1	6	0–1	0–1		2–0
Botswana	6	0	1	5	1	11	−10	1	0–0	0–2	0–2	

== Matches ==
5 September 2014
20:00 UTC±0

Senegal	2–0	Egypt
Diouf 17'; Mané 45'	Report

Stade Léopold Sédar Senghor, Dakar
Referee: Koman Coulibaly (Mali)
6 September 2014
20:15 UTC+1

Tunisia	2–1	Botswana
Khazri 74'; Chikhaoui 89' (pen.)	Report	Mogorosi 44'

Stade Mustapha Ben Jannet, Monastir
Referee: Mohamed Hamada (Mauritania)

10 September 2014
19:00 UTC+2

Botswana	0–2	Senegal
	Report	Mané 32'; N'Doye 83'

Botswana National Stadium, Gaborone
Referee: Janny Sikazwe (Zambia)
10 September 2014
21:00 UTC+3

Egypt	0–1	Tunisia
	Report	F. Ben Youssef 14'

30 June Stadium, Cairo
Referee: Bakary Gassama (Gambia)

10 October 2014
18:30 UTC+2

Botswana	0–2	Egypt
	Report	Elneny 56'; Salah 62'

Botswana National Stadium, Gaborone
Referee: Tessema Bamlak (Ethiopia)
10 October 2014
20:00 UTC±0

Senegal	0–0	Tunisia
	Report

Stade Léopold Sédar Senghor, Dakar
Referee: Eric Otogo-Castane (Gabon)

15 October 2014
19:00 UTC+2

Egypt	2–0	Botswana
Gamal 51'; Salah 72'	Report

Cairo International Stadium, Cairo
Referee: Bienvenu Sinko (Ivory Coast)
15 October 2014
20:15 UTC+1

Tunisia	1–0	Senegal
Sassi 90'	Report

Stade Mustapha Ben Jannet, Monastir
Referee: Rajindraparsad Seechurn (Mauritius)

14 November 2014
18:30 UTC+2

Botswana	0–0	Tunisia
	Report

Botswana National Stadium, Gaborone
Referee: Juste Ephrem Zio (Burkina Faso)
15 November 2014
19:00 UTC+2

Egypt	0–1	Senegal
	Report	Diouf 8'

Cairo International Stadium, Cairo
Referee: Sidi Alioum (Cameroon)

19 November 2014
20:00 UTC+1

Tunisia	2–1	Egypt
Chikhaoui 52'; Khazri 80'	Report	Salah 14'

Stade Mustapha Ben Jannet, Monastir
Referee: Noumandiez Doué (Ivory Coast)
19 November 2014
19:00 UTC±0

Senegal	3–0	Botswana
Mbodj 21'; Cissé 26'; Sow 72'	Report

Stade Léopold Sédar Senghor, Dakar
Referee: Mehdi Abid Charef (Algeria)
