= Gbolahan Salami =

Nigerian footballer (born 1991)

Fuad Gbolahan Salami
Personal information
- Full name: Fuad Gbolahan Salami
- Date of birth: 15 April 1991 (age 35)
- Place of birth: Lagos, Nigeria
- Height: 1.83 m (6 ft 0 in)
- Position: Forward

Youth career
- Sunshine Stars

Senior career*
Years	Team	Apps	(Gls)
2008–2010	Sunshine Stars		
2010–2014	Shooting Stars		
2014–2015	Warri Wolves		(33)
2015	→ Red Star Belgrade (loan)	0	(0)
2016–2018	KuPS	53	(22)
2018	Irtysh Pavlodar	17	(4)
2019	Al-Qaisumah	17	(8)
2020–2021	Najran	11	(3)
2021	Ohod	11	(1)
2022–2023	Al-Nasiriya		
2023–2024	Al-Taraf		

International career^{‡}
2009	Nigeria U-20	1	(0)
2014–2015	Nigeria	13	(3)
- * Club domestic league appearances and goals as of 14 August 2018 ‡ National team caps and goals as of 13 June 2015

Fuad Gbolahan Salami (born 15 April 1991) is a Nigerian footballer who plays as forward.

== Club career ==
He started with Sunshine Stars F.C. before moving to Ibadan-based Shooting Stars F.C. In 2010, he was suspended by the league for using threatening language after scoring in a league game against his old team. He joined Warri Wolves ahead of the 2014 season, and with ten games left was second in scoring with 13 league goals.

=== Red Star Belgrade ===
In January 2015, Salami transferred to Serbian side Red Star Belgrade by signing a loan deal for remainder of the season, with an option for permanent deal. He returned to Warri less than two months later when Red Star was having financial problems.

=== Irtysh Pavlodar ===
On 25 January 2018 Salami signed for Irtysh Pavlodar. On 9 August 2018, Salami left Irtysh Pavlodar by mutual consent.

== International career ==
Salami was part of the Nigeria national under-20 football team at the 2009 African Youth Championship. Then, he was part of the Nigeria national under-23 football team during their failed attempt to qualify for the 2012 London Olympics. In January 2014, coach Stephen Keshi, invited him to be a part of the Nigeria national football team for the 2014 African Nations Championship. He scored the only goal for the Home-based Eagles in their opening 2–1 loss to Mali.

He was called into the squad for the 2015 Africa Cup of Nations qualification and scored a late goal as a substitute against Congo, but Nigeria lost 3–2 at home. His form earned him a start in the next game away to South Africa.

=== International goals ===
Scores and results list Nigeria's goal tally first.

Goal	Date	Venue	Opponent	Score	Result	Competition
1.	11 January 2014	Cape Town Stadium, Cape Town, South Africa	Mali	1–2	1–2	2014 African Nations Championship
2.	6 September 2014	U.J. Esuene Stadium, Calabar, Nigeria	Congo	2–3	2–3	2015 Africa Cup of Nations qualification
3.	17 October 2015	Adokiye Amiesimaka Stadium, Port Harcourt, Nigeria	Burkina Faso	2–0	2–0	2016 African Nations Championship qualification

== Honours ==
=== Club ===
- Warri Wolves: Nigerian Premier Football League: runners-up 2014/2015

=== Individual ===
- Nigerian Premier League Top Scorer (1): 2014-2015
