= Domingues =

Mozambican footballer (born 1983)

Dominguês
Personal information
- Full name: Elias Gaspar Pelembe
- Date of birth: 13 November 1983 (age 43)
- Place of birth: Maputo, Mozambique
- Height: 1.73 m (5 ft 8 in)
- Positions: Attacking midfielder; winger

Team information
- Current team: UD Songo

Youth career
- Estrela Vermelha
- Desportivo Maputo

Senior career*
Years	Team	Apps	(Gls)
2004–2007	Desportivo Maputo		
2007–2009	Supersport United	56	(14)
2009–2015	Mamelodi Sundowns	93	(10)
2015–2020	Bidvest Wits	94	(4)
2021	Polokwane City	14	(0)
2021–2023	Royal AM	29	(3)
2023–	UD Songo	51	(9)

International career^{‡}
2004–	Mozambique	124	(17)
- * Club domestic league appearances and goals as of 13 November 2022 ‡ National team caps and goals as of 20:00, 5 January 2026 (UTC)

Elias Gaspar Pelembe (born 13 November 1983), also known as Dominguês, is a Mozambican footballer who plays as an attacking midfielder or winger for Moçambola club UD Songo and the Mozambique national team.

== Club career ==
Dominguês, as he is nicknamed, was born in Maputo. He moved to South Africa in 2007 from Desportivo Maputo. He was considered Supersport United's most influential player when they won the 2007–08 South African Premiership and was subsequently voted PSL Player of the Season.

During the summer of 2009, he was rumoured to be closing in on a move to one of Europe's bigger leagues as he had caught the eye of Tottenham Hotspur scouts following a string of impressive performers for club and national team. Eventually he was bought by big spenders Mamelodi Sundowns where he was handed a substantial wage.

On 17 May 2017, Bidvest Wits were crowned 2016–17 South African Premiership Champions, following a 2–0 win over Polokwane City, beating his former club Mamelodi Sundowns in the title race. According to his coach, Gavin Hunt, Dominguês was instrumental in that game. The win also meant he is now one of very few players to have won the South African Premiership title four times (with three different clubs), having also won two with Supersport United in 2007–08 South African Premiership and 2008–09 South African Premiership and one with Mamelodi Sundowns) in 2013–14 South African Premiership.

Furthermore, the win also meant he successfully completed a League and Cup double, since Bidvest Wits also won the MTN 8 title earlier in the season, with a 3–0 win over Mamelodi Sundowns at the Mbombela Stadium, on 1 October 2016.

He left Bidvest Wits at the end of the 2019–20 season. He joined Polokwane City in a free agent transfer in February 2021.

== International career ==
Dominguês began his international career with Mozambique in 2004 and went on to become the nation's most capped player, earning over 120 appearances.

On 24 December 2025, at the age of 42 years, one month and six days, Dominguês became the oldest-ever outfield player to make an appearance at the Africa Cup of Nations when he was introduced as a 67th-minute substitute in Mozambique's 1–0 group game loss to Ivory Coast, and second oldest overall only behind goalkeeper Essam El Hadary.

== Career statistics ==
As of 5 January 2026

Appearances and goals by national team and year
National team	Year	Apps	Goals
Mozambique	2004	1	0
Mozambique	2005	2	0
Mozambique	2006	3	0
Mozambique	2007	7	0
Mozambique	2008	9	2
Mozambique	2009	8	2
Mozambique	2010	7	1
Mozambique	2011	5	2
Mozambique	2012	5	1
Mozambique	2013	4	1
Mozambique	2014	11	3
Mozambique	2015	5	1
Mozambique	2016	6	2
Mozambique	2017	4	1
Mozambique	2018	4	0
Mozambique	2019	4	0
Mozambique	2020	4	0
Mozambique	2021	4	0
Mozambique	2022	4	0
Mozambique	2023	9	0
Mozambique	2024	12	1
Mozambique	2025	5	0
Mozambique	2026	1	0
Total		124	17

Scores and results list Mozambique's goal tally first, score column indicates score after each Domingues goal.

List of international goals scored by Domingues
No.	Date	Venue	Opponent	Score	Result	Competition
1	22 June 2008	Estádio da Machava, Maputo, Mozambique	Madagascar	3–0	3–0	2010 FIFA World Cup qualification
2	20 August 2008	Estádio da Machava, Maputo, Mozambique	Eswatini	3–0	3–0	Friendly
3	11 February 2009	Estádio da Machava, Maputo, Mozambique	Malawi	2–0	2–0	Friendly
4	20 June 2009	Moi International Sports Centre, Nairobi, Kenya	Kenya	1–1	1–2	2010 FIFA World Cup qualification
5	11 August 2010	Estádio da Machava, Maputo, Mozambique	Swaziland	1–0	2–1	Friendly
6	8 October 2011	Estádio da Machava, Maputo, Mozambique	Comoros	3–0	3–0	2012 Africa Cup of Nations qualification
7	15 November 2011	Estádio do Zimpeto, Maputo, Mozambique	Comoros	1–0	4–1	2014 FIFA World Cup qualification
8	9 September 2012	Estádio do Zimpeto, Maputo, Mozambique	Morocco	2–0	2–0	2013 Africa Cup of Nations qualification
9	9 June 2013	Stade du 28 Septembre, Conakry, Guinea	Guinea	1–2	1–6	2014 FIFA World Cup qualification
10	20 July 2014	National Stadium, Dar es Salaam, Tanzania	Tanzania	1–0	2–2	2015 Africa Cup of Nations qualification
11	3 August 2014	Estádio do Zimpeto, Maputo, Mozambique	Tanzania	2–1	2–1	2015 Africa Cup of Nations qualification
12	10 September 2014	Estádio do Zimpeto, Maputo, Mozambique	Niger	1–0	1–1	2015 Africa Cup of Nations qualification
13	29 March 2015	Lobatse Stadium, Lobatse, Botswana	Botswana	2–1	2–1	Friendly
14	4 June 2016	Amahoro Stadium, Kigali, Rwanda	Rwanda	1–0	3–2	2017 Africa Cup of Nations qualification
15	4 June 2016	Amahoro Stadium, Kigali, Rwanda	Rwanda	3–2	3–2	2017 Africa Cup of Nations qualification
16	2 September 2017	Estádio do Zimpeto, Maputo, Mozambique	Kenya	1–0	1–1	Friendly
17	14 October 2024	Mbombela Stadium, Mbombela, South Africa	Eswatini	1–0	3–0	2025 Africa Cup of Nations qualification

== Honours ==
Mamelodi Sundowns

- South African Premiership: 2013–14
- Nedbank Cup: 2014–15

SuperSport United

- South African Premiership: 2007–08, 2008–09

Bidvest Wits

- South African Premiership: 2016–17
- MTN 8: 2016
- Telkom Knockout Cup: 2017
