= Odaïr Fortes =

Cape Verdean footballer

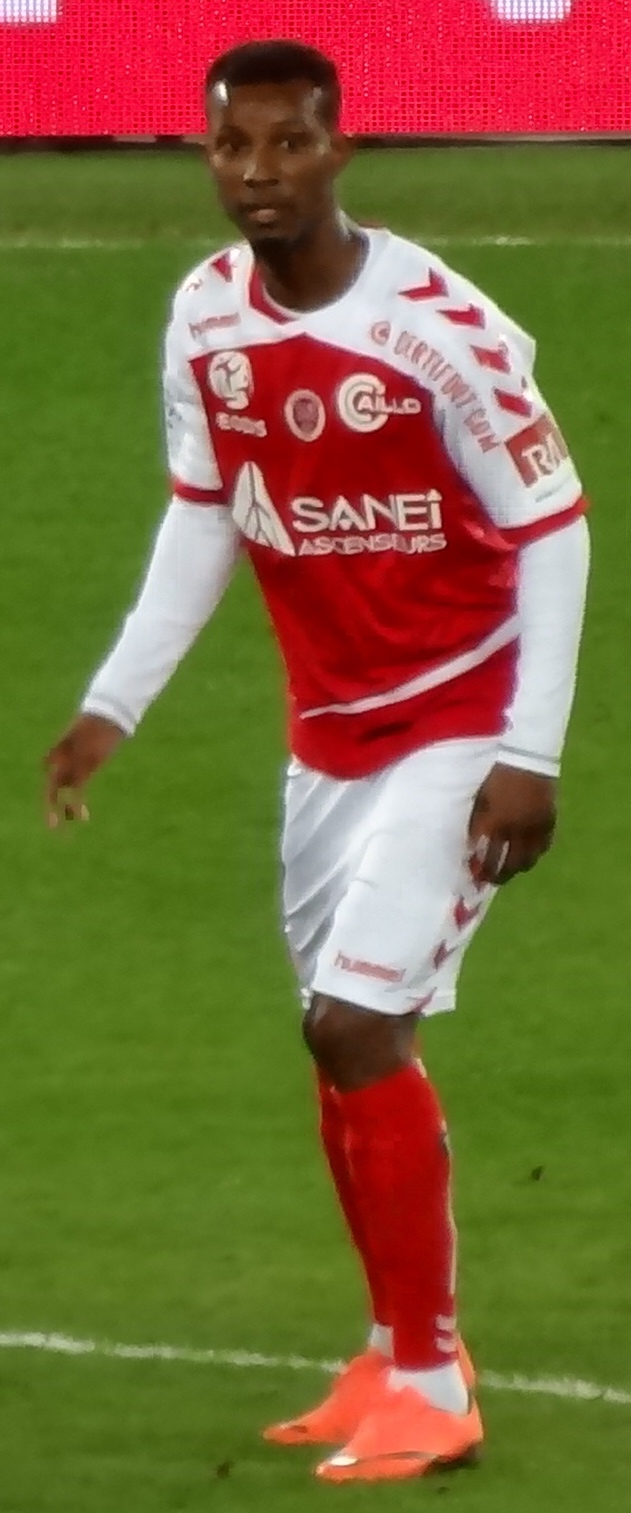
- Fortes with Reims in February 2016

Personal information
- Full name: Odaïr Júnior Lopes Fortes
- Date of birth: 31 March 1987 (age 39)
- Place of birth: Praia, Cape Verde
- Height: 1.85 m (6 ft 1 in)
- Position: Winger

Team information
- Current team: Reims Sainte-Anne

Senior career*
Years	Team	Apps	(Gls)
2006–2008	UJA Alfortville		
2008–2017	Reims	231	(23)
2017–2018	NorthEast United	4	(0)
2019–	Reims Sainte-Anne		

International career^{‡}
2010–	Cape Verde	28	(5)
- * Club domestic league appearances and goals as of 1 July 2018 ‡ National team caps and goals as of 23:16, 1 May 2020 (UTC)

Odaïr Júnior Lopes Fortes (born 31 March 1987) is a Cape Verdean professional footballer who plays as a winger for Régional 1 club Reims Saint-Anne and the Cape Verde national team.

== Career ==
Fortes was born in Praia to four brothers and sisters, he immigrated to the neighbourhood of Moulin-Vert in Vitry-sur-Seine in the Paris area in 2004. His first French club was UJA Alfortville where he spent three seasons first in the Paris-Île-de-France Division d'Honneur in 2007 and then CFA2 in 2008 he moved to Stade de Reims, in his first season, he played 23 matches in Ligue 2 and the club was relegated to the National level. In the 2009–10 season, he scored two goals in the first seven matches and Reims finished 2nd and returned to Ligue 2 in the following season, the club finished second in the 2011–12 season and participated into Ligue 1.

On 13 September 2017, Fortes signed for Indian Super League franchise NorthEast United. Managing to get only two starts in the team, he remained out of touch and was on the bench for most of the season. He was released by the club in the winter transfer window.

On 29 October 2019, Reims Sainte-Anne confirmed that Fortes had joined the Régional 1 club.

== International career ==
He represented the national team at 2015 Africa Cup of Nations.

=== International goals ===
Score and Result list Cape Verde's goal tally first

No.	Date	Venue	Opponent	Score	Result	Competition	Ref.
1.	26 March 2011	Estádio da Várzea, Praia, Cape Verde	Liberia	4–1	4–2	2012 Africa Cup of Nations qualification	
2.	9 June 2012	Estádio da Várzea, Praia, Cape Verde	Tunisia	1–1	1–2	2014 FIFA World Cup qualification	
3.	6 September 2014	Stade Général Seyni Kountché, Niamey, Niger	Niger	2–0	3–1	2015 Africa Cup of Nations qualification	
4.	31 March 2015	Estádio António Coimbra da Mota, Estoril, Portugal	Portugal	1–0	2–0	Friendly	
5.	13 June 2015	Estádio Nacional de Cabo Verde, Praia, Cape Verde	São Tomé and Príncipe	4–0	7–1	2017 Africa Cup of Nations qualification	
