= Bushi Moletsane =

Mosotho footballer (born 1984)

Personal information
- Full name: Bushi Moletsane
- Date of birth: 2 January 1984 (age 42)
- Place of birth: Lesotho
- Position: Central midfielder

Team information
- Current team: Lioli Teyateyaneng

Senior career*
Years	Team	Apps	(Gls)
2003–2007	Matlama Maseru		
2007–	Lioli Teyateyaneng		

International career^{‡}
2003–2015	Lesotho	53	(3)
- * Club domestic league appearances and goals ‡ National team caps and goals as of 08:48, 13 October 2015 (UTC)

Bushi Moletsane (born 2 January 1984) is a Mosotho footballer who currently plays as a midfielder for Lioli Teyateyaneng. Since 2003, he has won 53 caps and scored three goals for the Lesotho national football team.
