= Yacine Saandi =

French-born Comorian footballer (born 1987)

Yacine Saandi (born 2 April 1987 in Marseille, France) is a French-born Comorian footballer who has played 2 matches for the Comoros national football team.

== Career ==
Saandi has played amateur football for French sides US Marignane, and RCO Agde. He was tested at Nîmes Olympique in July 2011 but was not kept. Then he joined Spanish club CD Cudillero in the Tercera División. In July 2012, he was tested with the Grenoble Foot 38 but not kept.
