= Donou Kokou =

Togolese footballer

Personal information
- Full name: Niasidji Donou Kokou
- Date of birth: 24 April 1991 (age 35)
- Place of birth: Lomé, Togo
- Positions: Defender; midfielder

Team information
- Current team: Enugu Rangers
- Number: 21

Senior career*
Years	Team	Apps	(Gls)
2010–2015	Maranatha		
2016–	Enugu Rangers		

International career^{‡}
2011–2016	Togo	17	(1)
- * Club domestic league appearances and goals as of 15 August 2014 ‡ National team caps and goals as of 24 April 2017

Niasidji Donou Kokou (born 24 April 1991) is a Togolese footballer who currently plays for Enugu Rangers as a defender or midfielder.

== International career ==
Kokou played his first international game with the senior national team on 15 November 2011 against Guinea-Bissau (1–0), where he was part of the starting squad and played the entire match.

=== International goals ===
Scores and results list Togo's goal tally first.

No	Date	Venue	Opponent	Score	Result	Competition
1.	11 October 2014	Mandela National Stadium, Kampala, Uganda	Uganda	1–0	1–0	2015 Africa Cup of Nations qualification
