= Sibusiso Vilakazi =

South African soccer player

Personal information
- Full name: Sibusiso Vilakazi
- Date of birth: 29 December 1989 (age 36)
- Place of birth: Soweto, South Africa
- Height: 1.70 m (5 ft 7 in)
- Position: Midfielder

Youth career
- Bidvest Wits

Senior career*
Years	Team	Apps	(Gls)
2009–2016	Bidvest Wits	177	(32)
2016–2022	Mamelodi Sundowns	87	(18)
2022–2023	TS Galaxy	10	(0)
2023–2024	Sekhukhune United	14	(1)

International career^{‡}
2012–2019	South Africa	36	(5)
- * Club domestic league appearances and goals as of 12 October 2024 ‡ National team caps and goals as of 12 October 2017

Sibusiso Vilakazi (born 29 December 1989) is a South African soccer player who played as an attacking midfielder in the Premier Soccer League. In the 2013–14 Premier Soccer League season, he won the player of the season and players' player of the season awards. He also won the Nedbank Cup player of the tournament during that season.

He was released by Sekhukhune United in the summer of 2024.

== International career ==
Vilakazi made his international debut for South Africa on 12 October 2013 in a 1–1 draw against Morocco at the Adrar Stadium.

== Honours ==
Mamelodi Sundowns

Premier Soccer League: 2017–18; 2018–19; 2019–20; 2020–21; 2021–22

== International goals ==
Scores and results list South Africa's goal tally first.

#	Date	Venue	Opponent	Score	Result	Competition
1.	5 September 2014	Al-Merrikh Stadium, Omdurman, Sudan	Sudan	1–0	3–0	2015 Africa Cup of Nations qualification
2.	5 September 2014	Al-Merrikh Stadium, Omdurman, Sudan	Sudan	2–0	3–0	2015 Africa Cup of Nations qualification
3.	10 January 2015	Stade d'Angondjé, Libreville, Gabon	Cameroon	1–1	1–1	Friendly
4.	14 January 2015	Stade Augustin Monédan de Sibang, Libreville, Gabon	Mali	2–0	3–0	Friendly
5.	7 October 2017	FNB Stadium, Johannesburg, South Africa	Burkina Faso	3–0	3–1	2018 FIFA World Cup qualification
