= Férébory Doré =

Congolese footballer

Personal information
- Date of birth: 21 January 1989 (age 37)
- Place of birth: Brazzaville, Congo
- Height: 1.94 m (6 ft 4 in)
- Position: Forward

Team information
- Current team: Mosta
- Number: 99

Senior career*
Years	Team	Apps	(Gls)
2008–2009	AS Kondzo	26	(13)
2009–2013	Angers	105	(11)
2013	Petrolul Ploiești	16	(5)
2014–2015	Botev Plovdiv	12	(4)
2014–2015	→ CFR Cluj (loan)	14	(1)
2015–2018	Angers	18	(0)
2017–2018	→ Clermont (loan)	15	(2)
2019	Botev Plovdiv	16	(2)
2019–2022	SC Beaucouzé		
2022–2023	Saran	8	(1)
2023–	Mosta	8	(0)

International career^{‡}
2010–2017	Congo	37	(10)
- * Club domestic league appearances and goals as of 1 June 2019 ‡ National team caps and goals as of 23 March 2019

Férébory Doré (born 21 January 1989) is a Congolese professional footballer who plays as a forward for Maltese club Mosta. Between 2010 and 2017, he made 37 appearances scoring 10 goals for the Congo national team.

== Club career ==
=== Early years ===
Doré started his professional career with Angers SCO. During his four years at Stade Jean-Bouin, he scored 11 goals in 105 matches.

On 23 July 2013, Doré signed for Petrolul Ploiești after being linked with a move to Lille.

=== Botev Plovdiv ===
On 18 January 2014, Doré joined Bulgarian club Botev Plovdiv. He has mainly played as a starter for the team and scored a number of crucial goals such as a winner in a Cup game against Levski Sofia.

Between 28 June and early September, Doré was absent from the side and did not participate in any training sessions or matches, mainly due to his commitments to the Congo national team, with the Botev management on occasions unable to establish contact with the player. On 8 September 2014, it was announced that Doré has been loaned to CFR Cluj until the end of the season.

After three years and a half with Angers, he returned to Botev Plovdiv in February 2019 with a new contract.

== International career ==
Doré represented the Congo national team at the 2015 Africa Cup of Nations, where his team advanced to the quarterfinals.

== Career statistics ==
=== Club ===
As of 1 July 2019

Appearances and goals by club, season and competition
Club	Season	League			Cup (Note: Includes Coupe de la Ligue matches.)		Continental		Other (Note: Includes Trophée des Champions, Supercupa României and Bulgarian Supercup matches.)		Total	
Club	Season	Division	Apps	Goals	Apps	Goals	Apps	Goals	Apps	Goals	Apps	Goals
Angers	2009–10	Ligue 2	6	1	1	0	–		–		7	1
Angers	2010–11	Ligue 2	33	4	7	3	–		–		40	7
Angers	2011–12	Ligue 2	32	3	4	0	–		–		36	3
Angers	2012–13	Ligue 2	34	3	4	1	–		–		38	4
Angers	Total		105	11	16	4	0	0	0	0	121	15
Petrolul Ploiești	2013–14	Liga I	16	5	1	1	4	0	–		21	6
Botev Plovdiv	2013–14	A Group	12	4	5	3	0	0	–		17	7
CFR Cluj (loan)	2014–15	Liga I	14	1	4	3	0	0	–		18	4
Angers	2015–16	Ligue 1	9	0	0	0	–		–		9	0
Angers	2016–17	Ligue 1	9	0	3	0	–		–		12	0
Angers	Total		18	0	3	0	0	0	0	0	21	0
Clermont (loan)	2017–18	Ligue 2	15	2	3	1	–		–		18	3
Botev Plovdiv	2018–19	First League	16	2	4	2	–		–		20	4
Career total			196	25	34	16	4	0	0	0	236	39

=== International ===
Appearances and goals by national team and year
National team	Year	Apps	Goals
Congo	2010	1	0
Congo	2011	0	0
Congo	2012	4	0
Congo	2013	4	0
Congo	2014	9	3
Congo	2015	9	5
Congo	2016	4	2
Congo	2017	1	0
Total		31	10

Scores and results list Congo's goal tally first, score column indicates score after each Doré goal.

List of international goals scored by Férébory Doré
No.	Date	Venue	Opponent	Score	Result	Competition
1	1 June 2014	Stade Municipal, Pointe-Noire, Congo	Namibia	2–0	3–0	2015 Africa Cup of Nations qualifier
2	20 July 2014	Stade Municipal, Pointe-Noire, Congo	Rwanda	2–0	2–0	2015 Africa Cup of Nations qualifier
3	10 September 2014	Stade Municipal, Pointe-Noire, Congo	Sudan	1–0	2–0	2015 Africa Cup of Nations qualifier
4	31 January 2015	Estadio de Bata, Bata, Equatorial Guinea	DR Congo	1–0	2–4	2015 Africa Cup of Nations
5	5 September 2015	Estádio 24 de Setembro, Bissau, Bissau	Guinea-Bissau	1–0	4–2	2017 Africa Cup of Nations qualification
6	5 September 2015	Estádio 24 de Setembro, Bissau, Bissau	Guinea-Bissau	2–0	4–2	2017 Africa Cup of Nations qualification
7	5 September 2015	Estádio 24 de Setembro, Bissau, Bissau	Guinea-Bissau	3–0	4–2	2017 Africa Cup of Nations qualification
8	5 September 2015	Estádio 24 de Setembro, Bissau, Bissau	Guinea-Bissau	4–1	4–2	2017 Africa Cup of Nations qualification
9	4 September 2016	Stade Municipal de Kintélé, Brazzaville, Congo	Guinea-Bissau	1–0	1–0	2017 Africa Cup of Nations qualification
10	9 October 2016	Stade Municipal de Kintélé, Brazzaville, Congo	Egypt	1–0	1–2	2018 FIFA World Cup qualification
