= César Rivas =

Association football player

Personal information
- Full name: César Augusto Rivas Lasso
- Date of birth: 28 June 1979 (age 47)
- Place of birth: Puerto Tejada, Colombia
- Height: 1.70 m (5 ft 7 in)
- Position: Striker

Team information
- Current team: The Panthers
- Number: 4

Youth career
- Deportes Tolima

Senior career*
Years	Team	Apps	(Gls)
2000–2009	Deportes Tolima	201	(25)
2009–2010	Independiente Medellín	18	(1)
2010	Deportivo Pereira	13	(6)
2012–2013	Fortaleza	36	(11)
2013	Alfonso Ugarte	5	(1)
2015	The Panthers		

International career^{‡}
2013–2014	Equatorial Guinea	3	(0)
- * Club domestic league appearances and goals as of 7 May 2013 ‡ National team caps and goals as of 16 June 2013

César Augusto Rivas Lasso (born 28 June 1979) is a retired footballer who played as a striker. Born and raised in Colombia, he was naturalized by Equatorial Guinea and played for the latter's national team.

== Club career ==
Rivas has played for Deportes Tolima, Independiente Medellín, Deportivo Pereira and Fortaleza in Colombia; for Alfonso Ugarte in Peru and for The Panthers in Equatorial Guinea.
