= Francis N'Ganga =

Congolese footballer (born 1985)

Personal information
- Date of birth: 16 June 1985 (age 41)
- Place of birth: Poitiers, France
- Height: 1.76 m (5 ft 9 in)
- Positions: Left back; defensive midfielder

Youth career
- –2004: Grenoble Foot 38

Senior career*
Years	Team	Apps	(Gls)
2004–2009	Grenoble	106	(2)
2009–2012	Tours	81	(0)
2012–2019	Charleroi	157	(1)
2019	Ermis Aradippou	8	(0)
2019–2020	Lokeren	5	(0)

International career^{‡}
2008–2017	Congo	41	(3)
- * Club domestic league appearances and goals as of 26 October 2019 ‡ National team caps and goals as of 4 March 2018

Francis N'Ganga (born 16 June 1985) is a retired Congolese footballer who played as a left back.

== Club career ==
On 12 July 2019, he signed with Lokeren.

== International career ==
His debut in the national team was on 7 September 2008 in Brazzaville vs. Mali.

He represented the national team at the 2015 Africa Cup of Nations, where his team advanced to the quarterfinals.

== Career statistics ==
=== Club ===
As of 4 January 2019

Appearances and goals by club, season and competition
Club	Season	League			National Cup		Europe		Other		Total	
Club	Season	Division	Apps	Goals	Apps	Goals	Apps	Goals	Apps	Goals	Apps	Goals
Grenoble	2005–06	Ligue 2	27	1	0	0	—		—		27	1
Grenoble	2006–07	Ligue 2	33	0	0	0	—		—		33	0
Grenoble	2007–08	Ligue 2	30	1	0	0	—		—		30	1
Grenoble	2008–09	Ligue 1	9	0	0	0	—		—		9	0
Grenoble	Grenoble total		99	2	0	0	—		—		99	2
Tours	2009–10	Ligue 2	30	0	0	0	—		2 (Note: Appearances in the Coupe de la Ligue)	0	32	0
Tours	2010–11	Ligue 2	24	0	0	0	—		1	0	25	0
Tours	2011–12	Ligue 2	22	0	0	0	—		1	0	23	0
Tours	Tours total		76	0	0	0	—		4	0	80	0
Charleroi	2012–13	Pro League	31	0	1	0	—		—		32	0
Charleroi	2013–14	Pro League	11	0	1	0	—		—		12	0
Charleroi	2014–15	Pro League	20	0	1	0	—		—		21	0
Charleroi	2015–16	Pro League	37	0	1	0	4 (Note: Appearances in the Europa League)	0	—		42	0
Charleroi	2016–17	First Division A	34	1	2	0	—		—		36	1
Charleroi	2017–18	First Division A	24	0	3	1	—		0	0	27	1
Charleroi	Charleroi total		157	1	9	1	4	0	0	0	170	2
Career total			332	3	9	1	4	0	4	0	349	4

=== International ===
Scores and results list Congo's goal tally first.

No	Date	Venue	Opponent	Score	Result	Competition
1.	15 November 2011	Stade Municipal, Pointe-Noire, Congo	São Tomé and Príncipe	1–1	1–1	2014 FIFA World Cup qualification
2.	19 November 2014	Khartoum Stadium, Khartoum, Sudan	Sudan	1–0	1–0	2015 Africa Cup of Nations qualification
3.	17 November 2015	Stade Alphonse Massemba-Débat, Brazzaville, Congo	Ethiopia	1–1	2–1	2018 FIFA World Cup qualification
