= Comoros national football team results (1979–2019) =

This is a list of international football games played by the Comoros national football team from 1979 to 2019.

== 1979–2007 ==
26 August 1979 Indian Ocean Games	Mauritius	3–0	Comoros	Stade Michel Volnay, Saint-Denis
	L'Enflé ?

28 August 1979 Indian Ocean Games	Comoros	1–3	Mauritius	Stade Michel Volnay, Saint-Denis
	Goal		Jacquotte; Noël

29 August 1979 Indian Ocean Games	Comoros	2–1	Maldives	Stade Michel Volnay, Saint-Denis
	Goal		Goal

31 August 1979 Indian Ocean Games	Réunion	6–1	Comoros	Stade Michel Volnay, Saint-Denis
	Goal		Goal

27 August 1985 Indian Ocean Games	Réunion	1–0	Comoros	Stade George V, Curepipe
	Goal

29 August 1985 Indian Ocean Games	Comoros	2–2	Maldives	Stade George V, Curepipe
	Goal		Goal

21 August 1990 Indian Ocean Games	Madagascar	1–0	Comoros	Antananarivo
	Goal

23 August 1990 Indian Ocean Games	Réunion	0–1	Comoros	Antananarivo
			Goal

27 August 1990 Indian Ocean Games	Mauritius	4–0	Comoros	Antananarivo
	Moosa; Mocude ? ?

29 August 1990 Indian Ocean Games	Seychelles	3–1	Comoros	Antananarivo
	Goal		Goal

20 August 1993 Indian Ocean Games	Madagascar	5–0	Comoros	Stade Linité, Victoria
	Rafanodina 4', 41'; Mosa 18', 58'; Ranaivoson 83'

22 August 1993 Indian Ocean Games	Mauritius	3–0	Comoros	Stade Linité, Victoria
	Mocude 26', 47', 63'

7 August 1998 Indian Ocean Games	Madagascar	3–0	Comoros	Stade Michel Volnay, Saint-Denis
	Rasoanaivo 33'; Rijaly 55'; Mosa 67'

11 August 1998 Indian Ocean Games	Seychelles	3–0	Comoros	Stade Michel Volnay, Saint-Denis
	Goal

30 August 2003 Indian Ocean Games	Réunion	1–0	Comoros	Stade Auguste Vollaire, Centre de Flacq
	Willy Robert 34'			Attendance: 103; Referee: Jean-Claude Labrosse

2 September 2003 Indian Ocean Games	Comoros	0–4	Réunion	Stade Auguste Vollaire, Centre de Flacq
			Payet 6', 87'; Hoarau 10', 74'

4 September 2003 Indian Ocean Games	Mauritius	5–0	Comoros	Stade George V, Curepipe
	Christopher Perle 8', 87'; Kersley Appou 42' (pen.); Henri Speville 47'; Jimmy Cundasamy 70'			Attendance: 4,500; Referee: Jean-Claude Labrosse

6 September 2003 Indian Ocean Games	Seychelles	2–0	Comoros	Stade George V, Curepipe
	Yelvahny Rose 2', 25'

14 December 2006 Arab Nations Cup	Yemen	2–0	Comoros	Ali Mohsen Muraisi Stadium, Sana'a
	Nashwan Al Haggam 73', 90'

17 December 2006 Arab Nations Cup	Djibouti	2–4	Comoros	Ali Mohsen Muraisi Stadium, Sana'a
	Khaliff Hassan 43'; Abdul Rahman Okishi 90+2'		7' Meknesh Bi Daoud; 21', 70' Ahmad Seif; 40' Mohammad Moni

10 August 2007 Indian Ocean Games	Comoros	1–1	Réunion	Mahamasina Stadium, Antananarivo
	Kassim Abdallah 35'		52' Sall Malick	Attendance: 9,000

14 August 2007 Indian Ocean Games	Madagascar	3–0	Comoros	Mahamasina Stadium, Antananarivo
	Paulin Voavy 70', 89'; Claudio Ramiadamanana 90'

14 October 2007 2010 World Cup Q.	Madagascar	6–2	Comoros	Mahamasina Stadium, Antananarivo
14:30 UTC+3	Andriantsima 30', 40', 49' (pen.), 57'; Rakotomandimby 65'; Tsaralaza 79'	(Report)	6' Midtadi; 53' (pen.) Ibor	Attendance: 7,754; Referee: Wellington Kaoma

17 November 2007 2010 World Cup Q.	Comoros	0–4	Madagascar	Said Mohamed Cheikh, Mitsamiouli
		(Report)	38', 52' Nomenjanaharay; 62' Rakotomandimby; 74' Robson	Attendance: 1,610; Referee: Jerome Damon

== 2008–2014 ==
20 July 2008 2008 COSAFA Cup	Comoros	0–3	Namibia	Lilian Ngoyi Stadium, Secunda
		(Report)	25' Lazarus Kaimbi; 53', 74' Quinton Jacobs	Attendance: 350; Referee: Jean-Claude Labrosse

22 July 2008 2008 COSAFA Cup	Comoros	0–1	Malawi	Lilian Ngoyi Stadium, Secunda
		(Report)	62' Fisher Kondowe	Attendance: 450

24 July 2008 2008 COSAFA Cup	Comoros	0–1	Lesotho	Lilian Ngoyi Stadium, Secunda
		(Report)	74' Moli Lesesa

18 October 2009 2009 COSAFA Cup	Comoros	0–0	Botswana	Barbourfields Stadium, Bulawayo
				Referee: Jose Rachide

20 October 2009 2009 COSAFA Cup	Seychelles	1–2	Comoros	Barbourfields Stadium, Bulawayo
	Anakora 53'		7' Ali; 76' Mouigini	Referee: Jose Rachide

22 October 2009 2009 COSAFA Cup	Swaziland	3–0	Comoros	Barbourfields Stadium, Bulawayo
	Thwala 35'; Ma. Dlamini 56'; Mthethwa 67'			Referee: Helder Martins de Carvalho

29 August 2010 Friendly	Madagascar	1–0	Comoros	Rabemananjara Stadium, Mahajanga
	? 45+3'	(Report)

5 September 2010 2012 AFCON Q.	Zambia	4–0	Comoros	Konkola Stadium, Chililabombwe
15:00 UTC+2	Kalaba 6'; Tembo 22'; Chamanga 29'; Mayuka 83'	(Report)		Referee: Amanuel Eyob Russom

9 October 2010 2012 AFCON Q.	Comoros	0–1	Mozambique	Said Mohamed Cheikh, Mitsamiouli
15:00 UTC+3		(Report)	90+1' Josemar	Referee: Ibada Ramadhan Kibo

28 March 2011 2012 AFCON Q.	Libya	3–0	Comoros	Stade 26 mars, Bamako
18:00 UTC±0	El Khatroushi 20'; Abdelkader 70'; Bindi 82'	(Report)		Referee: Badara Diatta

5 June 2011 2012 AFCON Q.	Comoros	1–1	Libya	Said Mohamed Cheikh, Mitsamiouli
15:00 UTC+3	Mzé Mbaba 83'	(Report)	Boussefi 43'	Referee: Hamada Nampiandraza

4 August 2011 Indian Ocean Games	Seychelles	0–0	Comoros	Stade d'Amitié, Praslin
14:00 UTC+4		(Report)		Attendance: 1,800; Referee: Steeve Dubec

6 August 2011 Indian Ocean Games	Comoros	2–2	Maldives	Stade Linité, Victoria
19:00 UTC+4	Madîhali 9'; Soulaimane 54'	(Report)	4' Thoriq; 45' (pen.) Fazeel	Attendance: 1,000; Referee: Steeve Dubec

9 August 2011 Indian Ocean Games	Mauritius	2–0	Comoros	Stade d'Amitié, Praslin
18:00 UTC+4	Pithia 35'; Calambé 87'	(Report)		Attendance: 300; Referee: Harouna Rassuhi

4 September 2011 2012 AFCON Q.	Comoros	1–2	Zambia	Said Mohamed Cheikh, Mitsamiouli
15:00 UTC+3	Y. M'Changama 32'	(Report)	23' C. Katongo; 87' Mayuka	Referee: Issa Kagabo

8 October 2011 2012 AFCON Q.	Mozambique	3–0	Comoros	Estadio da Machava, Maputo
15:00 UTC+2	Maninho 6'; Dário 18' (pen.); Domingues 40'	(Report)		Referee: Dennis Nguluwe

11 November 2011 2014 World Cup Q.	Comoros	0–1	Mozambique	Said Mohamed Cheikh, Mitsamiouli
15:00 UTC+3		(Report)	Miro 54' (pen.)	Attendance: 3,000; Referee: David Jane

15 November 2011 2014 World Cup Q.	Mozambique	4–1	Comoros	Estádio do Zimpeto, Maputo
19:00 UTC+2	Domingues 26'; Sitoe 45'; Whiskey 59'; Baúque 84'	(Report)	Youssouf 72'	Attendance: 10,000; Referee: Ruzive Ruzive

1 December 2012 2014 CHAN Q.	Mauritius	2–0	Comoros	Stade George V, Curepipe
15:00 UTC+4	Calambé 59'; Pithia 72'	(Report)		Referee: Abdoul Kanoso

15 December 2012 2014 CHAN Q.	Comoros	0–0	Mauritius	Said Mohamed Cheikh, Mitsamiouli
16:00 UTC+4		(Report)		Referee: Samuel Chirinda

5 March 2014 Friendly	Burkina Faso	1–1	Comoros	Stade Francis Turcan, Martigues
	A. Traoré 17' (pen.)		50' (pen.) Y. M'Changama	Attendance: 3.000; Referee: Saïd Ennjimi

18 May 2014 2015 AFCON Q.	Kenya	1–0	Comoros	Nyayo National Stadium, Nairobi
16:00 UTC+3	Omolo 34'	(Report)		Referee: Wellington Kaoma

30 May 2014 2015 AFCON Q.	Comoros	1–1	Kenya	Said Mohamed Cheikh, Mitsamiouli
15:00 UTC+3	Saandi 78'	(Report)	56' Masika	Referee: Djamal Aden

== 2015–2019 ==
13 June 2015 2017 AFCON Q.	Burkina Faso	2–0	Comoros	Stade du 4 Août, Ouagadougou
18:00 UTC±0	Bancé 61'; Zongo 82'	(Report)		Attendance: 22.000; Referee: Lazard Tsiba

21 June 2015 2016 CHAN Q.	Zimbabwe	2–0	Comoros	Rufaro Stadium, Harare
15:00 UTC+2	Rusike 10'; Mudehwe 90'			Referee: Mbongiseni Fakudze

4 July 2015 2016 CHAN Q.	Comoros	0–0	Zimbabwe	Stade de Beaumer, Moroni
15:00 UTC+3				Referee: Samuel Chirindza

5 September 2015 2017 AFCON Q.	Comoros	0–1	Uganda	Said Mohamed Cheikh, Mitsamiouli
15:00 UTC+3		Report	26' Mawejje	Referee: Allister Barra

7 October 2015 2018 World Cup Q.	Comoros	0–0	Lesotho	Stade de Moroni, Moroni
15:00 UTC+3		Report (FIFA); Report (CAF)		Attendance: 2,800; Referee: Andofetra Rakotojaona

13 October 2015 2018 World Cup Q.	Lesotho	1–1	Comoros	Setsoto Stadium, Maseru
18:00 UTC+2	Seturumane 18'	Report (FIFA); Report (CAF)	70' M'Changama	Attendance: 480; Referee: Samuel Chirindza

13 November 2015 2018 World Cup Q.	Comoros	0–0	Ghana	Said Mohamed Cheikh, Mitsamiouli
15:00 UTC+3		Report (FIFA); Report (CAF)		Attendance: 7,000; Referee: Norman Matemera

17 November 2015 2018 World Cup Q.	Ghana	2–0	Comoros	Baba Yara Stadium, Kumasi
15:00 UTC±0	Wakaso 18'; J. Ayew 85'	Report (FIFA); Report (CAF)		Attendance: 16,480; Referee: Mohamed Ragab Omar

24 March 2016 2017 AFCONQ	Comoros	1–0	Botswana	Said Mohamed Cheikh, Mitsamiouli
15:00 EAT	Ben 59'	Report		Referee: Duncan Lengani

27 March 2016 2017 AFCONQ	Botswana	2–1	Comoros	Francistown Stadium, Francistown
16:00 CAT	Moyana 48'; Mogorosi 87'	Report	43' M'Changama	Referee: Joaquin Esono Eyang

5 June 2016 2017 AFCONQ	Comoros	0–1	Burkina Faso	Stade de Beaumer, Moroni
15:00 EAT		Report	80' S. A. Traoré	Referee: Louis Hakizimana

4 September 2016 2017 AFCONQ	Uganda	1–0	Comoros	Mandela National Stadium, Kampala
17:00 EAT	Miya 36'	Report		Referee: Malang Diedhiou

11 November 2016 Friendly	Togo	2–2	Comoros	Stade El Menzah, Tunis
14:00 CET	Ayité 37'; Agbégniadan 90'	Report	43', 76' Ben	Attendance: 50; Referee: Nasrallah Jaouadi

15 November 2016 Friendly	Gabon	1–1	Comoros	Stade El Menzah, Tunis
14:00 CET	Lemina 66'	Report	Bakar 24'	Attendance: 100; Referee: Sadok Selmi

24 March 2017 2019 AFCONQ	Comoros	2–0	Mauritius	Said Mohamed Cheikh, Mitsamiouli
15:00 EAT	B. Youssouf 53'; Alhadhur 75'	Report		Referee: Martin Eliphas Sanya

28 March 2017 2019 AFCONQ	Mauritius	1–1	Comoros	Stade Anjalay, Belle Vue Maurel
16:00 MUT	Bru 45'	Report	15' Ben Nabouhane	Referee: Nelson Fred

4 June 2017 Friendly	Togo	2–0	Comoros	Stade Paul Le Cesne, Marseille
	Laba 37'; Nya-Vedji 90'	Report		Attendance: 300

10 June 2017 2019 AFCONQ	Malawi	1–0	Comoros	Kamuzu Stadium, Blantyre
14:30 CAT	Phiri 32'	Report		Referee: Denis Dembélé

15 July 2017 2018 CHANQ	Comoros	2–0	Lesotho	Stade de Moroni, Moroni
15:00 EAT	I. Youssouf 47'; Bacar 78'	Report		Referee: Ganesh Chutooree

23 July 2017 2018 CHANQ	Lesotho	1–0	Comoros	Setsoto Stadium, Maseru
15:00 SAST	Koloti 10'	Report		Referee: Andofetra Rakotojaona

13 August 2017 2018 CHANQ	Comoros	2–1	Namibia	Stade de Moroni, Moroni
15:00 EAT	Mradabi 41'; M. Youssouf 45+1'	Report	69' (pen.) Somaeb	Referee: Christopher Harrison

20 August 2017 2018 CHANQ	Namibia	2–0	Comoros	Sam Nujoma Stadium, Windhoek
15:00 WAT	Katupose 55', 90+4'	Report		Referee: Wisdom Chewe

6 October 2017 Friendly	Mauritania	0–1	Comoros	Stade El Menzah, Tunis
19:00 UTC+1		Report	84' Y. M'Changama	Referee: Karim Khemiri

11 November 2017 Friendly	Madagascar	1–1	Comoros	Stade Municipal, Saint-Leu-la-Forêt
15:00 CET	Razakanantenaina 6'	Report	54' M'Changama	Referee: Laurent Kopriwa

24 March 2018 Friendly	Kenya	2–2	Comoros	Stade de Marrakech, Marrakesh
17:00 WEST	Wanyama 4' (pen.); Miheso 83'	Report	7' M'Changama; 72' Bakar	Referee: Karim Sabri

27 May 2018 2018 COSAFA Cup	Comoros	1–1	Seychelles	Old Peter Mokaba Stadium, Polokwane
16:30 SAST	M'Changama 60'	Report	83' Coralie	Referee: Ahmad Imtehaz Heeralall

29 May 2018 2018 COSAFA Cup	Mozambique	3–0	Comoros	Seshego Stadium, Polokwane
17:00 SAST	Jeitoso 39'; Luís 44', 72'	Report		Referee: Jackson Pavaza

31 May 2018 2018 COSAFA Cup	Madagascar	1–0	Comoros	Old Peter Mokaba Stadium, Polokwane
17:30 SAST	Jaotombo 45+1'	Report		Referee: Tirelo Mositwane

8 September 2018 2019 AFCONQ	Comoros	1–1	Cameroon	Stade Said Mohamed Cheikh, Mitsamiouli
15:00 EAT	Ben Nabouhane 15'	Report	80' Bahoken	Referee: Gehad Grisha

13 October 2018 2019 AFCONQ	Morocco	1–0	Comoros	Stade Mohammed V, Casablanca
19:00 WEST	Fajr 90+7' (pen.)	Report		Referee: Ali Lemghaifry

16 October 2018 2019 AFCONQ	Comoros	2–2	Morocco	Stade Said Mohamed Cheikh, Mitsamiouli
15:00 EAT	Ben Nabouhane 7', 90+2'	Report	53' Boutaïb; 62' Amrabat	Referee: Davies Omweno

17 November 2018 2019 AFCONQ	Comoros	2–1	Malawi	Stade de Moroni, Moroni
15:00 EAT	Ben Nabouhane 2'; Chamed 67'	Report	P. Phiri 65'	Referee: Louis Hakizimana

23 March 2019 2019 AFCONQ	Cameroon	3–0	Comoros	Stade Ahmadou Ahidjo, Yaoundé
16:00 WAT	Choupo-Moting 37'; Bassogog 53'; N'Jie 89'	Report		Referee: Bakary Gassama

27 May 2019 2019 COSAFA Cup	Eswatini	2–2	Comoros	King Zwelithini Stadium, Durban
17:00 SAST	Ndzinisa 25'; Badenhorst 50'	Report	Bacar 42'; I. Youssouf 52'	Referee: Ganesh Chutooree

29 May 2019 2019 COSAFA Cup	Comoros	2–1	Mauritius	King Zwelithini Stadium, Durban
17:30 SAST	I. Youssouf 47'; I. Soulaimana 65'	Report	Nazira 53'	Referee: Eugene Salas Mdluli

1 June 2019 2019 COSAFA Cup QF	Zimbabwe	2–0	Comoros	Princess Magogo Stadium, Durban
17:30 SAST	Rusike 6'; Billiat 36'	Report		Referee: Eugene Salas Mdluli

4 June 2019 2019 COSAFA Cup Plate SF	Comoros	1–2	Malawi	Princess Magogo Stadium, Durban
19:30 SAST	N. M'Changama 61'	Report	Mbulu 30'; Chirwa 90'	Referee: Brian Nsubuga Miiro

7 June 2019 Friendly	Ivory Coast	3–1	Comoros	Boulogne-sur-Mer, France
18:00 CEST	Bony 40', 59'; Abdallah 90' (o.g.)	Report	Y. M'Changama 90+4' (pen.)	Stadium: Stade de la Libération; Attendance: 1,500; Referee: Mehdi Mokhtari (France)

26 July 2019 2020 CHANQ	Comoros	0–2	Namibia	Mitsamiouli, Comoros
15:00 EAT		Report	Kambindu 63'; Fredericks 89'	Stadium: Stade Said Mohamed Cheikh; Referee: Nelson Emile Fred (Seychelles)

4 August 2019 2020 CHANQ	Namibia	0–0 (2–0 agg.)	Comoros	Windhoek, Namibia
16:00 WAT		Report		Stadium: Sam Nujoma Stadium; Referee: Brighton Chimene (Zimbabwe)

6 September 2019 2022 World Cup Q.	Comoros	1–1	Togo	Moroni, Comoros
15:00 EAT	Djoudja 49'	Report	Laba 34'	Stadium: Stade de Moroni; Referee: Elly Sasii (Tanzania)

10 September 2019 2022 World Cup Q.	Togo	2–0 (3–1 agg.)	Comoros	Lomé, Togo
16:00 GMT	M'Dahoma 10' (o.g.); Sunu 71'	Report		Stadium: Stade de Kégué; Attendance: 13,000; Referee: Pierre Atcho (Gabon)

12 October 2019 Friendly	Guinea	0–1	Comoros	Versailles, France
16:00 GMT		Report	Ben Nabouhane 70'	Stadium: Stade de Montbauron

14 November 2019 2021 AFCONQ	Togo	0–1	Comoros	Lomé, Togo
16:00 GMT		Report	Selemani 51'	Stadium: Stade de Kégué; Referee: Jean-Jacques Ndala Ngambo (DR Congo)

18 November 2019 2021 AFCONQ	Comoros	0–0	Egypt	Moroni, Comoros
16:00 EAT		Report		Stadium: Stade Omnisports de Malouzini; Referee: Bienvenu Sinko (Ivory Coast)
