= List of foreign soccer players in South Africa =

This is a list of non-South African footballers who currently play association football in South Africa.

== Asia - AFC ==
=== Australia ===
- James Brown - (Cape Town City FC) - 2016
- Kearyn Baccus - Kaizer Chiefs (2019-2022)

=== India ===
- Brandon Fernandes – (ASD Cape Town) – Youth
- Myron Mendes – (ASD Cape Town) – Youth

=== New Zealand ===
- Andre de Jong - AmaZulu, Royal AM, Stellenbosch FC

== Africa - CAF ==
=== Algeria ===
- Farès Hachi - (Mamelodi Sundowns F.C.) - 2017-

=== Angola ===
- Antonio Correia - (Ajax Cape Town F.C.) - 2011
- Armando Pedro

=== Benin ===
- Koutche Kabirou - (Witbank Spurs F.C.) - 2016-
- Christophe Aifimi - (Black Leopards F.C.) - 2017-

=== Botswana ===
- Lesenya Ramoraka - (Highlands Park F.C.) - 2019
- Mogakolodi Ngele - (Black leopards F.C.) - 2019-
- Phenyo Mongala
- Thabang Sesinyi - (Platinum Stars F.C.) - 2017-
- Mpho Kgaswane - (Baroka F.C.) - 2017-
- Lebogang Ditsele - (Highlands Park F.C.) - 2016-
- Mogogi Gabonamong -
- Joel Mogorosi -
- Diphetogo "Dipsy" Selolwane -(Santos F.C.) - 2005

=== Burkina Faso ===
- Aristide Bancé - (Chippa United F.C.) - 2015-16
- Issouf Paro - (Engen Santos) - 2015-17

=== Burundi ===
- Valery Nahayo
- Kevin Ndayisenga - (Jomo Cosmos F.C.) - 2016-
- Frédéric Nsabiyumva - Jomo Cosmos F.C.) - 2014-
- Fiston Abdul Razak - (Mamelodi Sundowns F.C., Bloemfontein Celtic F.C.) - 2015, 2016–17, 2017-

=== Cameroon ===
- Jean Njoh
- Halidou Malam - (Kaizer Chiefs F.C.) - 1999
- Eric Bisser - (Ajax Cape Town F.C.) - 2008-09
- Alain Amougou - (Mamelodi Sundowns F.C.) - 1999-02
- Eyong Enoh - (Ajax Cape Town F.C.) - 2006-08
- Luc Zoa
- Didier Mbendje
- Amour Patrick Tignyemb - (Bloemfontein Celtic F.C., Chippa United F.C.) - 2008-2019, 2019

=== Cape Verde ===
- Jerry Adriano - (Orlando Pirates) - 2008-09

=== Chad ===
- Marco Mourmada - (Witbank Aces) - 1995-1997

=== Djibouti ===
- Mohamed Liban - (Dynamos Giyani) - 2010-2014

=== DR Congo ===
- Tsholola Tshinyama (Ajax Cape Town F.C)
- Dikulu Bageta (Ajax Cape Town F.C
- Kanku Mulekelayi (Ajax Cape Town F.C
- Cyrille Mubiala (Ajax Cape Town F.C
- Liswa Nduti
- Lelo Mbele
- Marcel Nkueni
- Eshele Botende
- Kabamba Musasa - (Kaizer Chiefs)
- Felix Musasa - (Orlando Pirates)
- Tshamala Kabanga - (Orlando Pirates) - 2003-05
- Michel Babale - (Free State Stars F.C., Kaizer Chiefs F.C., Orlando Pirates F.C., Black Leopards F.C., Wits University F.C., F.C. AK, Maritzburg United F.C., Highlands Park F.C.) - 1997-01, 2001–02, 2002–03, 2003–04, 2004–06, 2006–08, 2009, 2014
- Jean Munganga - (Black Leopards F.C.) - 2012-
- Ibrahim Somé Salombo - (Ajax Cape Town F.C.) - 2005-06
- Emeka Mamale - (Free State Stars F.C., Kaizer Chiefs, Platinum Stars F.C.) - 1998-99, 1999-01, 2006–07
- Bunene Ngaduane - (Free State Stars F.C., Moroka Swallows F.C.) - 1993-94, 1997–99, 2000

=== Egypt ===
- Amr Gamal – Bidvest Wits – 2017–18

=== Equatorial Guinea ===
- Felipe Ovono - Orlando Pirates - 2015–17
- Manuel Sapunga – Polokwane City, Sekhukhune United – 2023–

=== Ethiopia ===
- Fikru Tefera - (Orlando Pirates, Supersport United, Free State Stars F.C., University of Pretoria F.C., Milano United F.C., Bidvest Wits F.C., Highlands Park F.C.) - 2006-07, 2007–09, 2010–11, 2013, 2013–14, 2014, 2015, 2017

=== Gabon ===
- Allen Nono - (Free State Stars F.C.) - 2017-
- Stevy Nzambe - (AmaZulu F.C.) - 2016-
- Guy-Roger Nzeng

=== Gambia ===
- Emil Sambou - (Engen Santos)
- Pa Dembo Touray - (Engen Santos) - 2012-15

=== Ghana ===
- Samuel Darpoh
- Fatau Dauda - (Orlando Pirates) - 2013-14
- Kwame Attram - (Tshakhuma Tsha Madzivhandila F.C.) - 2015
- Joseph Masel - (Ajax Cape Town F.C.) - 2008-09
- Louis Agyemang - (Kaizer Chiefs F.C., Dynamos) - 2005-07, 2007–08
- Ofosu Appiah - (Jomo Cosmos F.C.) - 2011-12
- Jonathan Mensah - Free State Stars F.C. - 2008-09
- Mohamed Awal - (Maritzburg United F.C.) - 2012-15

=== Guinea ===
- Bangali Keïta - (Free State Stars F.C.) - 2017-
- Aboubacar Fofana - (Ajax Cape Town F.C.) - 2009-10
- Kémoko Camara
- Seydouba Soumah

=== Guinea-Bissau ===
- Bacar Baldé - (Vasco da Gama) - 2015-16

=== Ivory Coast ===
- Didi Gnepa - (Orlando Pirates)
- Badra Ali Sangaré - (Free State Stars F.C.) - 2017-
- Brice Aka - (Maritzburg United F.C., Jomo Cosmos F.C.) - 2008-14, 2014-
- Aubin Takutchie - (SuperSport United F.C., Hellenic F.C., Bidvest Wits F.C., Fidentia Rangers) - 2003-04, 2004–05, 2005–06
- Serge Djiehoua - (Kaizer Chiefs F.C.) - 2005-08
- Franck Manga Guela - (Mamelodi Sundowns F.C.) - 2003-04
- Siaka Tiéné - (Mamelodi Sundonws F.C.) - 2003-05
- Abraham Gneki Guié - (Jomo Cosmos) - 2006-07
- Mohammed Diallo
- Soumahoro Bangaly

=== Kenya ===
- Brian Onyango - (Engen Santos, Maritzburg United F.C.)
- David Gateri - (Salt River Blackpool ASD)

=== Lesotho ===
- Katleho Moleko Santos, Amazulu
- Motlalepula Mofolo
- Lehlohonolo Seema - (Bloemfontein Celtic F.C., Orlando Pirates)
- Tefo Maipato - (Orlando Pirates)
- Lekoane Lekoane - (Kaizer Chiefs F.C.)
- Tsepo Lekhoana - (Maluti FET College)
- Sepiriti Malefane - (Bloemfontein Celtic F.C.) - 2013-14

Lebajoa Mphongoa Bloemfotein Celtic Motlatsi Shale Bloemfontein Celtic Tshwrelo Bereng Moroka Swallows, Chipa Unites, Black Leopards Tumelo Khutlang Black Leopards Paballo Mpakanyane Tembisa Classic Teele Ntsonyana Wits University Tseliso Thite Bloemfontein Celtic Luciano Matsoso Black Leopards Nkoto Masoabi Real Kings Motebang Sera Bloemfontein Celtic Motlomelo Mkwanazi Tshakhuma Madzivhadila Moses Maliehe Vaal Professionals

=== Liberia ===
- Kpah Sherman - (Mpumalanga Black Aces F.C., Engen Santos) - 2015-16, 2016
- Anthony Laffor - (Jomo Cosmos F.C., Supersport United, Mamelodi Sundowns F.C.) - 2005-08, 2008–12, 2012-
- Herron Berrian - (Free State Stars F.C.) - 2012-13
- Dulee Johnson - (AmaZulu F.C.) - 2012

=== Madagascar ===
- Arohasina Andrianarimanana - (Kaizer Chiefs F.C., Black Leopards F.C.) 2018-2019, 2019-

=== Mali ===
- Abdoulaye Camara
- Sékou Camara
- Cheick Cissé - (Moroka Swallows F.C.) - 2011-2013
- Ousmane Berthé - (Jomo Cosmos F.C.) - 2008-13

=== Malawi ===
- Muhammad Sulumba
- Chiukepo Msowoya
- Joseph Kamwendo
- Essau Kanyenda - (Jomo Cosmos F.C., Polokwane City F.C.) - 2001-03, 2012–17
- Micium Mhone - (Jomo Cosmos F.C.) - 2016-17
- Harry Nyirenda - (Black Leopards F.C.) - 2011-
- Chiukepo Msowoya - (Orlando Pirates, Platinum Stars F.C.) - 2010-12, 2012
- Hellings "Gabadinho" Mhango -Bloemfotein Celtic, bidvest and Orlando pirates
- Gerald "papa" Phiri- Baroka fc

=== Mauritius ===
- Jean-Marc Ithier - (Santos Cape Town) - 1999-06
- Jean-Sébastien Bax - (Santos Cape Town) - 2000-08

=== Mozambique ===
- Domingues
- Jeitoso
- Hélder Pelembe
- Tomás Inguana
- Dário Monteiro
- Edmilson Gabriel Dove - (Cape Town City FC) - 2017-
- Jossias Macamo - (Kaizer Chiefs F.C., Dynamos Giyani, Moroka Swallows F.C.) - 2001-03, 2003–05, 2005–06
- Edmilson Dove - (Cape Town City F.C.) - 2016-
- Nuro Tualibudane - (Jomo Cosmos F.C., AmaZulu F.C.) - 1998-02, 2002–03
- Vitinho - (Mamelodi Sundowns, Platinum Stars F.C.) - 2002-03
- Tico-Tico - (Jomo Cosmsos F.C., SuperSport United F.C., Orlando Pirates, Maritzburg United F.C., Jomo Cosmos F.C.) - 1997-00, 2000–04, 2004–06, 2006–08, 2008, 2008–10

=== Namibia ===
- Deon Hotto
- Floris Diergaardt
- Rudolf Bester
- Henrico Botes
- Heinrich Isaacks
- Quinton Jacobs
- Danzyl Bruwer
- Richard Gariseb
- Rudolf Bester
- Wangu Gome
- Denzil Hoaseb
- Theophilus Tsowaseb
- Quinton Jacobs - (Black Leopards F.C., Ajax Cape Town F.C.) - 2001-03, 2005–06
- Lazarus Kaimbi - (Jomo Cosmos F.C.) - 2006-12
- Tangeni Shipahu - (AmaZulu F.C.) - 2010-12
- Mahoumed Auseb - (Kaizer Chiefs)
- Robert Nauseb - (Kaizer Chiefs)
- (Vigil Freese) - ([Kaizer Chiefs]), (Maritzburg United)

=== Niger ===
- Boubacar Talatou
- Seidou Idrissa - (Chippa United F.C.) - 2012-13

=== Nigeria ===
- Onyekachi Okonkwo
- Chibuzor Nwogbo
- Tony Ilodigwe
- Franklin Ogbonna - (Jomo Cosmos F.C.)
- Shaibu Dazumi (Mamelodi Sundowns F.C.)
- Benson Otiti - (Wits University F.C.)
- Teslim Fatusi - (Mamelodi Sundowns F.C.)
- Abdullahi Ishaka - (AmaZulu F.C.) - 2009-10
- Willy Okpara - (Orlando Pirates) - 1989-05
- Tasiu Mohammed - (Ajax Cape Town F.C.) - 2009
- Wasiu Ipaye - (Kaizer Chiefs F.C.) - 1997-98
- Christian Nwaokorie - (Orlando Pirates) - 1997-98
- Ezenwa Otorogu - (Orlando Pirates, Bloemfontein Celtic F.C.) - 2010-11, 2011–12
- Sonny Opara - (Orlando Pirates) - 1997-98
- Ibezito Ogbonna - (Kaizer Chiefs F.C.) - 2008-10
- Ibrahim Omotayo - (Maritzburg United F.C., Durban Stars F.C.) - 2006, 2007
- Raphael Chukwu - (Mamelodi Sundowns F.C.) - 1996-99, 2000–01, 2004
- Solomon Okpako - (Mamelodi Sundonws F.C., Engen Santos)

=== Republic of Congo ===
- Harris Tchilimbou - (Free State Stars F.C.) - 2018-
- Christoffer Mafoumbi - (Free State Stars F.C.) - 2016-17
- Old Jupiter Itoua - (AmaZulu F.C.) - 2001-06
- Béranger Itoua - (Orlando Pirates) - 2013
- Fabry Destin Makita-Passy

=== Rwanda ===
- Olivier Kwizera - (Free State Stars F.C.) - 2017-

=== Senegal ===
- Mame Niang - (Moroka Swallows F.C., SuperSport United F.C., University of Pretoria F.C., SuperSport United F.C., Mamelodi Sundowns F.C., Stellenbosch F.C.) - 2005-07, 2011–12, 2012–13, 2013–14, 2014–15, 2017
- El-Hadji Abdou Samb - (Jomo Cosmos F.C.) - 2011-13, 2016
- Bouna Coundoul - (Platinum Stars F.C.) - 2015-16

=== Sudan ===
- Haytham Tambal - (Orlando Pirates) - 2006-07

=== Swaziland ===
- Dennis Masina
- Phinda Dlamini
- Sandile Ginindza - (Royal Eagles F.C.) - 2012-13
- Ronnie Dube - (Kaizer Chiefs F.C.)
- Siza Dlamini
- Bongani Mdluli
- Sibusiso Dlamini
- John Mdluli
- Tony Tsabedze
- Wonder Nhleko
- Dennis Masina

=== Tanzania ===
- Abdi Banda - (Baroka F.C.)
- Uhuru Mwambungu
- Deogratias Munishi

=== Togo ===
- Sadat Ouro-Akoriko

=== Uganda ===
- Allan Kateragga - (Cape Town City F.C. (2016)) - 2018-
- Vusimuzi Mngomezulu - (Polokwane City F.C.) - 2018-
- Timothy Batabaire
- Boban Zirintusa
- Dennis Onyango - Mamelodi Sundowns

=== Zambia ===
- Hijani Himoonde
- Clive Hachilensa
- Perry Mutapa
- Isaac Chansa
- Aubrey Funga - (Ajax Cape Town F.C.) - 2017
- Rotson Kilambe - (Mamelodi Sundowns, Bloemfontein Celtic F.C., Kaizer Chiefs) - 2003-05, 2005–06, 2006–07
- Davies Mwape - (Orlando Pirates, FC AK, Jomo Cosmos F.C.) - 2005-06, 2006–07, 2007–08
- Sandras Kumwenda - (Dynamos, City Pillars F.C.) - 2002-03, 2003–04
- Christopher Katongo - (Jomo Cosmos F.C., Golden Arrows, Bidvest Wits F.C.) - 2004-07, 2014, 2014–15
- James Chamanga - (Bush Bucks, SuperSport United F.C., Moroka Swallows F.C.) - 2005-06, 2006–07, 2007–08
- Collins Mbesuma - (Kaizer Chiefs F.C., Mamelodi Sundowns F.C., Moroka Swallows F.C., Golden Arrows, Orlando Pirates, Mpumalanga Black Aces F.C., Highlands Park F.C. - 2004-05, 2008–09, 2009–10, 2010–12, 2012–14, 2014–16, 2016–17
- Dennis Lota - (Witbank Aces, Orlando Pirates, Dangerous Darkies, Moroka Swallows F.C., FC AK, AmaZulu F.C., Mpumalanga Black Aces F.C.) - 1996-97, 1998-02, 2003–04, 2004–06, 2006–07, 2007–08, 2008–09
- Oliver Bvuma- ROSEBANK COLLEGE F.C.

=== Zimbabwe ===
- Bruce Grobbelaar
- Bobby Chalmers
- Takesure Chinyama
- Zvenyika Makonese
- Musa Mnguni
- Edelbert Dinha
- Erick Chipeta
- Serge Djiéhoua
- Kudakwashe Mahachi
- Tatenda Mkuruva
- Onismor Bhasera
- Khama Billiat
- Tendai Ndoro
- George Chigova
- Teenage Hadebe
- Ovidy Karuru
- Marshall Munetsi
- Evans Rusike
- Talent Chawapiwa
- Simba Nhivi
- Robson Muchichwa
- Qadr Amin - (Orlando Pirates)
- Simba Sithole - (Ajax Cape Town F.C.) - 2014
- Edmore Chirambadare - (Kaizer Chiefs F.C.) - 2016-
- Michelle Katsvairo - (Kaizer Chiefs F.C.) - 2016-
- Thomas Chideu - (Ajax Cape Town F.C.) - 2015-2017
- Blessing Moyo - (Maritzburg United F.C.) - 2016-
- Adam Ndlovu - (Moroka Swallows F.C., Dynamos Giyani, Free State Stars F.C.) - 2002-03, 2003–04, 2004–05
- Prince Dube - (Supersport United) - 2017-
- Patrick Musaka - (Black Leopards F.C.) - 2016-
- Benjani Mwaruwari - (Jomo Cosmos F.C., Chippa United F.C., Bidvest Wits F.C.) - 1999-02, 2012–13, 2013–14
- Luke Jukulile - (Kaizer Chiefs F.C., Dynamos) - 2001-02, 2002–04
- Rodreck Mutuma - (Bloemfontein Celtic F.C.) - 2013-14
- Shingayi Kaondera - (SuperSport United F.C.) - 2006-07
- Peter Ndlovu - (Mamelodi Sundowns F.C., Thanda Royal Zulu F.C.) - 2004-08, 2008–09
- Nyasha Mushekwi - (Mamelodi Sundowns F.C.) - 2010-15
- Tauya Mrewa - (Hellenic F.C., SuperSport United F.C., Ajax Cape Town F.C., AmaZulu F.C., Bush Bucks) - 1999, 1999-01, 2001–02, 2002, 2002–05
- Ian Gorowa - (Cape Town Spurs - 1997-99
- Cuthbert Malajila - (Maritzburg United F.C., Mamelodi Sundowns F.C., Bidvest Wits F.C., Mamelodi Sundowns F.C.) - 2012-13, 2013–16, 2016–17, 2017-
- Kingston Nkhatha - (Free State Stars F.C., Carara Kicks F.C., Free State Stars F.C., Black Leopards F.C., Kaizer Chiefs F.C., SuperSport United F.C.) - 2007-08, 2008–09, 2009–11, 2011–12, 2012–15, 2015-
- George Nechironga - (Bloemfontein Celtic F.C., Free State Stars F.C., African Wanderers F.C.) - 1993-94, 1996–99, 1999-00, 2000-01
- Knox Mutizwa
- Wilfred Mugeyi - (Bush Bucks F.C., Ajax Cape Town F.C., Free State Stars F.C.) - 1993-94, 1995-00, 2000–03, 2003–06, 2006–07
- Knowledge Musona - (Kaizer Chiefs F.C.) - 2009-11, 2013–14
- Gilbert Mushangazhike - (Manning Rangers, Orlando Pirates, Mpumalanga Black Aces F.C., Orlando Pirates) - 1997-03, 2007–09, 2009–10, 2010
- Lincoln Zvasiya - (Kaizer Chiefs F.C.) - 2011-14

== Europe - UEFA ==
=== Austria ===
- Roland Putsche - (Cape Town City F.C. (2016)) - 2016-
- Walter Rautmann - (Powerlines FC, Berea Park F.C., Highlands Park F.C.)
- Markus Böcskör - (Kaizer Chiefs F.C.) - 2007-08
- Kurt Scherr - (Powerlines FC)
- Peter Rath - (Powerlines FC)

=== Belgium ===
- Maxime Cosse - (Free State Stars F.C.) - 2018-
- Andréa Fileccia - (Free State Stars F.C.) - 2014-16, 2016-

=== Bosnia and Herzegovina ===
- Boris Savić - (Moroka Swallows F.C.) - 2014-15

=== Denmark ===
- Kai Johansen

=== England ===
- Johnny Haynes
- Peter Withe
- Gary France
- Sam Mason-Smith - (Stellenbosch F.C.) - 2018-
- Chris Chilton - (Highlands Park F.C.) - 1974-78
- Carl Finnigan - (Chippa United F.C.) - 2013-14
- Jeff Astle - (Hellenic F.C.) - 1974
- James Keene
- Ian Filby
- Johnny Byrne
- Milija Aleksic
- Maurice Hepworth - Arcadia Shepherds

=== France ===
- Derek Decamps - (Ajax Cape Town F.C.) - 2009-11
- Joris Delle- (Orlando Pirates) 2019-20

=== Finland ===
- Anssi Jaakkola - (Ajax Cape Town F.C.) - 2013-16

=== Germany ===
- Thomas Cichon - (Moroka Swallows F.C.) - 2009-10
- Wolfgang Gayer - (Durban City F.C.) - 1972, (Hellenic F.C.) - 1973
- Volkmar Groß - (Hellenic F.C.) - 1972-74

=== Georgia ===
- Giorgi Nergadze - (Moroka Swallows F.C., Bidvest Wits F.C.) - 2010-14, 2014–15

=== Gibraltar ===
- Tony Macedo

=== Iceland ===
- Árni Gautur Arason - (Thanda Royal Zulu) - 2008
- Jóhannes Eðvaldsson - (Cape Town City F.C.) - 1972

=== Latvia ===
- Pāvels Šteinbors - (Golden Arrows F.C.) - 2012-13

=== Montenegro ===
- Slavko Damjanović - (Bidvest Wits F.C.) - 2017-

=== Netherlands ===
- Rolf de Boer - (Ajax Cape Town F.C.) - 1999
- Marciano Vink - (Ajax Cape Town F.C.) - 2001-02
- Geert Brusselers _ (Ajax Cape Town F.C.) - 2001-02
- Jeremy Overbeek-Bloem - (Ajax Cape Town F.C.) - 2001-03
- Koen van de Laak
- Sander Westerveld
- Alje Schut - (Mamelodi Sundowns) - 2012-15

=== Northern Ireland ===
- George Best
- Eric Welsh

=== Norway ===
- Arne Bjørnstad

=== Portugal ===
- Luis Boa Morte - (Orlando Pirates) - 2012

=== Republic of Ireland ===
- Ryan Hartslief
- Eoin Hand

=== Romania ===
- Tiberiu Lung - (Mpumalanga Black Aces F.C.) - 2010
- Vasile Gergely - (Durban City F.C.) - 1972-73

=== Russia ===
- Grigori Grishin - (University of Pretoria F.C.) - 2016-

=== Scotland ===
- Willie McIntosh
- Ben Anderson
- Joe Frickleton - (Highlands Park F.C.) - 1964-74
- Danny Cameron - (Hellenic F.C.)
- Jim Forrest - (Cape Town City F.C.) - 1973
- Danny Ferguson - (Durban United F.C.) - 1967-68
- Joe Fascione - (Durban City F.C.) - 1969-71
- Eddie Connachan - (East London United F.C.) - 1969-72
- Alfie Conn Sr. - (Johannesburg Ramblers) - 1960
- Ian Gibson
- Matt Gray
- Alf Boyd

=== Serbia ===
- Obren Čučković - (Moroka Swallows F.C.) - 2014-15
- Igor Bondžulić - (Moroka Swallows F.C.) - 2013-14
- Dejan Bogunović - (Maritzburg United F.C.) - 2006-07
- Sead Bajramović - (Free State Stars F.C.) - 2007-08
- Samir Nurkovic - (Kaizer Chiefs F.C) - 2019-

=== Spain ===
- Alfonso Tiravit - (Powerlines FC)

=== Wales ===
- Bryan Orritt
- Michael Brown - (Highlands Park F.C.)

== North America - CONCACAF ==
=== United States ===
- Dino Ramic - (Highlands Park F.C.) - 2015-16
- Morgan Cathey - (Ikapa Sporting F.C.)

== Oceania - OFC ==
=== New Zealand ===
No	Name	Club(s)	span
1	Jeremy Brockie	Supersport United, Mamelodi Sundowns, Maritzburg United(loan)	2015-18; 2018- 2019-
2	Michael Utting	Supersport United	2000-2002
3	Michael Boxall	Supersport United	2015-2017

== South America - CONMEBOL ==
=== Argentina ===
- Nick Gindre - (AmaZulu F.C., Mpumalanga Black Aces F.C.) - 2009-10, 2011–12
- Óscar Fabbiani - (Cape Town Spurs) - 1984-85
- Sergio Egea - (Lusitano FC)
- Vincent Principiano-(Mamelodi Sundowns F.C.) 2006 - 07
- Jorge Sanabria

=== Brazil ===
- Walter da Silva
- Jairzinho - (Kaizer Chiefs F.C.) - 1975
- Ricardo Nascimento - (Mamelodi Sundowns FC)
- Marcos Paulo Aguiar de Jesus - (Wits University F.C.) - 2006-08
- Fábio Bittencourt da Costa - (Mamelodi Sundowns FC) - 2006-07
- Wanderson Costa Viana - (Ajax Cape Town F.C.) - 2012-13
- Igor Alves - (Moroka Swallows F.C.) - 2008-11
- Getúlio Vargas - (Orlando Pirates) - 2011-12
- Pepe - (Wits University F.C.) - 2006-08
- William Moreira - (Moroka Swallows F.C.) - 1997-98
- Rodrigo Gomes - (Ajax Cape Town F.C.) - 2000-01
- Elton Morelato - (Moroka Swallows F.C.) - 2008-09
- Thiago Rodrigo dos Santos - (Moroka Swallows F.C.)
- Pedrão - (Highlands Park F.C.)
- Marcelo - (Orlando Pirates ) - 2018-19

=== Chile ===
- Jorge Acuña - (Mamelodi Sundowns F.C.) - 2007-09

=== Colombia ===
- Robinson Rentería - (Maritzburg United F.C.) - 2008-09
- Leonardo Castro - (Mamelodi Sundowns F.C., Kaizer Chiefs FC) 2015-17, 2018-current

=== Peru ===
- Augusto Palacios - (Witbank Spurs F.C., AmaZulu F.C.) - 1984-89, 1990

=== Venezuela ===
- Rafael Dudamel – Mamelodi Sundowns (2005–06)
- José Torrealba – Mamelodi Sundowns (2005–07) & Kaizer Chiefs (2008–11)
- Gustavo Páez – Kaizer Chiefs (2017–2019)
- José Meza – Mamelodi Sundowns (2018–20) & Maritzburg United (2020–22)
- Juan Carlos Ortiz – Stellenbosch (2022–)
- Darwin González – Cape Town City (2022–)
- Edson Castillo - kaizer chiefs (2023—present)

=== Uruguay ===
- Bryan Aldave - (Mamelodi Sundowns F.C.) - 2008-09
- Leandro Gastón Sirino Rodríguez - (Mamelodi Sundowns F.C) - 2019-2024, kaizer chiefs - 2024 — present
