= 2008 COSAFA Cup =

2008 COSAFA Senior Challenge Cup

Tournament details
- Host country: South Africa
- Dates: 19 July - 3 August
- Teams: 14 (from 1 confederation)
- Venues: 3 (in 3 host cities)

Final positions
- Champions: South Africa (3rd title)
- Runners-up: Mozambique
- Third place: Zambia
- Fourth place: Madagascar

Tournament statistics
- Matches played: 20
- Goals scored: 39 (1.95 per match)
- Top scorer: (Seychelles) Phillip Zialor (4)

The 2008 COSAFA Cup is the 12th edition of the football tournament that involves teams from Southern Africa.

Due to their internal competitions calendar, Angola decided to send their under-20 national team to play in this tournament and South Africa will play with a "Development XI"; therefore matches involving Angola and South Africa will not count towards FIFA ranking according to FIFA.

South Africa won the tournament defeating Mozambique 2-1 in the final.

== Qualifying ==
Took place between 19–24 July, group winners qualified for the final tournament.

=== Group A ===
Team	Pts	Pld	W	D	L	GF	GA	GD
Madagascar	5	3	1	2	0	4	3	+1
Swaziland	5	3	1	2	0	3	2	+1
Seychelles	4	3	1	1	1	8	2	+6
Mauritius	1	3	0	1	2	2	10	-8

- Madagascar through to quarter finals after a coin toss win.

19 July 2008

Madagascar	1 - 1	Swaziland
Hubert Robson 66'		Phinda Dlamini 42'

Atlantic Stadium
Witbank, South Africa

19 July 2008

Mauritius	0 - 7	Seychelles
		Phillip Zialor (4 goals); Don Anacoura; Collin Laporte; Trevor Poiret

Atlantic Stadium
Witbank, South Africa

21 July 2008

Madagascar	1 - 1	Seychelles
Tovohery Rabenandrasana

Atlantic Stadium
Witbank, South Africa

21 July 2008

Mauritius	1 - 1	Swaziland
Johan Marmitte 31'		Gcina Mazibuko 51'

Atlantic Stadium
Witbank, South Africa

23 July 2008

Madagascar	2 - 1	Mauritius
Tovohery Rabenandrasana 19'; Praxis Rabemananjara 68'		Wesley Marquette 12'

Atlantic Stadium
Witbank, South Africa

23 July 2008

Seychelles	0 - 1	Swaziland
		Mfanzile Dlamini 90'

Atlantic Stadium
Witbank, South Africa

=== Group B ===
Team	Pts	Pld	W	D	L	GF	GA	GD
Namibia	7	3	2	1	0	5	1	+4
Malawi	6	3	2	0	1	2	1	+1
Lesotho	4	3	1	1	1	2	2	0
Comoros	0	3	0	0	3	0	5	-5

20 July 2008

Comoros	0 - 3	Namibia
	(Report)	Lazarus Kaimbi 25'; Quinton Jacobs 53', 74'

Lilian Ngoyi Stadium
Secunda, South Africa
Attendance: 350
Referee: Jean-Claude Labrosse (SEY)

20 July 2008

Lesotho	0 - 1	Malawi
	(Report)	Chiukepo Msowoya 77'

Lilian Ngoyi Stadium
Secunda, South Africa
Attendance: 750

22 July 2008

Comoros	0 - 1	Malawi
	(Report)	Fisher Kondowe 62'

Lilian Ngoyi Stadium
Secunda, South Africa
Attendance: 450

22 July 2008

Lesotho	1 - 1	Namibia
Thabane Rankara 83'	(Report)	Jamu Ngatjizeko 25'

Lilian Ngoyi Stadium
Secunda, South Africa
Attendance: 600
Referee: Rajindraparsad Seechurn (MRI)

24 July 2008

Comoros	0 - 1	Lesotho
		Moli Lesesa 74'

Lilian Ngoyi Stadium
Secunda, South Africa

24 July 2008

Malawi	0 - 1	Namibia
	(Report)	Lazarus Kaimbi 52'

Lilian Ngoyi Stadium
Secunda, South Africa
Attendance: 950
Referee: Kenais Marange (ZIM)

== Final tournament ==
Angola, Zambia, South Africa, Mozambique, Zimbabwe and Botswana were seeded directly for the quarter-finals according to FIFA World Rankings of April 2008. This decision was made 21 May 2008 and confirmed on 7 July 2008. The actual draw for the 2 qualifying groups and the quarter-finals according to these seeds was held on 10 June 2008.

=== Quarter finals ===
26 July 2008

Angola U-20s	0 - 1	Madagascar
		Praxis Rabemananjara 22'

Atlantic Stadium
Witbank, South Africa

26 July 2008

South Africa	1 - 0	Namibia
Rooi Mahamutsa 6'

Atlantic Stadium
Witbank, South Africa

27 July 2008

Botswana	0 - 2	Mozambique
		Momed Hagi 18'; Nito 90+'

Lilian Ngoyi Stadium
Secunda, South Africa

27 July 2008

Zambia	0 - 0 (5-4 pen.)	Zimbabwe

Lilian Ngoyi Stadium
Secunda, South Africa

=== Semi finals ===
30 July 2008

Madagascar	1 - 2	Mozambique
Praxis Rabemananjara 28'		Tico-Tico 18'; Momed Hagi 62'

Thulamahashe Stadium
Bushbuckridge, South Africa

30 July 2008

South Africa	1 - 0	Zambia
Lefa Tsutsulupa 14'

Thulamahashe Stadium
Bushbuckridge, South Africa

=== 3rd Place Match ===
3 August 2008
13:00

Madagascar	0 - 2	Zambia
		Emmanuel Mayuka 56'; Francis Kombe 78'

Thulamahashe Stadium
Bushbuckridge, South Africa

=== Final ===
3 August 2008
15:00

South Africa	2 - 1	Mozambique
Marchelino Fransch 18', 60'		Gerson Txuma 90+3'

Thulamahashe Stadium
Bushbuckridge, South Africa

== Scorers ==
4 goals

- (Seychelles) Phillip Zialor
- (Madagascar) Praxis Rabemananjara

2 goals

- (Madagascar) Tovohery Rabenandrasana
- (Mozambique) Momed Hagi
- (Namibia) Lazarus Kaimbi
- (Namibia) Quinton Jacobs
- (South Africa) Marchelino Fransch

1 goal

- (Lesotho) Moli Lesesa
- (Lesotho) Thabane Rankara
- (Malawi) Fisher Kondowe
- (Malawi) Chiukepo Msowoya
- (Mauritius) Johan Marmitte
- (Mauritius) Wesley Marquette
- (Mozambique) Tico-Tico
- (Mozambique) Nito
- (Mozambique) Gerson Txuma
- (Namibia) Jamuovandu Ngatjizeko
- (Seychelles) Don Anacoura
- (Seychelles) Collin Laporte
- (Seychelles) Trevor Poiret
- (South Africa) Rooi Mahamutsa
- (South Africa) Lefa Tsutsulupa
- (Eswatini) Phinda Dlamini
- (Eswatini) Gcina Mazibuko
- (Eswatini) Mfanzile Dlamini
- (Zambia) Emmanuel Mayuka
- (Zambia) Francis Kombe
