= 2009 COSAFA Cup =

2009 COSAFA Senior Challenge Cup

Tournament details
- Host country: Zimbabwe
- Teams: 13 (from 1 confederation)
- Venue(s): 2 (in 2 host cities)

Final positions
- Champions: Zimbabwe (4th title)
- Runners-up: Zambia
- Third place: Mozambique
- Fourth place: South Africa

Tournament statistics
- Matches played: 17
- Goals scored: 34 (2 per match)
- Top scorer(s): (Zimbabwe) Cuthbert Malajila

The 2009 COSAFA Cup is the 13th edition of the football tournament that involves teams from Southern Africa.

South Africa had originally expressed an interest in hosting the 2009 and 2010 events but later reneged and Zimbabwe was given the task to host the tournament.

Madagascar were to take part in the competition as the fourth team in group A, but withdrew. South Africa and Angola will take part with a Development XI and an U-20 squad respectively, and their matches will not be counted as A internationals by FIFA.

== Group stage ==
=== Group A ===
Team	Pld	W	D	L	GF	GA	GD	Pts
Zimbabwe	2	1	1	0	5	2	+3	4
Lesotho	2	1	1	0	3	2	+1	4
Mauritius	2	0	0	2	0	4	−4	0

17 October 2009
15:30

Zimbabwe	3–0	Mauritius
Malajila 47', 55'; Mwanjali 85'	Match report

Rufaro Stadium, Harare
Attendance: 25,000
Referee: Abdul Basit Ebrahim (South Africa)

19 October 2009
13:30

Lesotho	2–2	Zimbabwe
Maile 55' (pen.), 85' (pen.)	Match report	6' Malajila; 61' Gwekwerere

Rufaro Stadium, Harare
Referee: Tebogo Israel Ramocha (Botswana)

21 October 2009
15:30

Mauritius	0–1	Lesotho
	Match Report	88' Marabe

Rufaro Stadium, Harare
Referee: Robert Ngosi (Malawi)

=== Group B ===
Team	Pld	W	D	L	GF	GA	GD	Pts
Botswana	3	2	1	0	3	0	+3	7
Swaziland	3	2	0	1	5	2	+3	6
Comoros	3	1	1	1	2	4	−2	4
Seychelles	3	0	0	3	2	6	−4	0

18 October 2009
13:30

Comoros	0–0	Botswana

Barbourfields Stadium, Bulawayo
Referee: Jose Rachide (Mozambique)

18 October 2009
15:30

Swaziland	2–1	Seychelles
Thwala 72'; Mf. Dlamini 75'	Match Report	6' Laurence

Barbourfields Stadium, Bulawayo
Referee: Helder Martins de Carvalho (Angola)

20 October 2009
13:30

Botswana	1–0	Swaziland
Ramoshibidu 55'

Barbourfields Stadium, Bulawayo
Referee: Rajindraparsad Seechurn (Mauritius)

20 October 2009
15:30

Seychelles	1–2	Comoros
Anakora 53'		7' Ali; 76' Mouigini

Barbourfields Stadium, Bulawayo
Referee: Jose Rachide (Mozambique)

22 October 2009
13:30

Swaziland	3–0	Comoros
Thwala 35'; Ma. Dlamini 56'; Mthethwa 67'

Barbourfields Stadium, Bulawayo
Referee: Helder Martins de Carvalho (Angola)

22 October 2009
15:30

Seychelles	0–2	Botswana
		6' Moloi; 36' Bolelang

Barbourfields Stadium, Bulawayo
Referee: Rajindraparsad Seechurn (Mauritius)

== Knockout stage ==
=== Bracket ===
Quarter-finals
South Africa	2
Angola	0
Zimbabwe	1
Botswana	0
Malawi	0
Mozambique	1
Namibia	0
Zambia	1

Semi-finals
South Africa	1 (2)
Zimbabwe	1 (3)
Mozambique	0
Zambia	2

Final
Zimbabwe	3
Zambia	1

=== Quarter-finals ===
25 October 2009
13:30

Malawi	0–1	Mozambique
		34' Josemar

Rufaro Stadium, Harare
Referee: Tebogo Israel Ramocha (Botswana)

25 October 2009
15:30

Namibia	0–1	Zambia
		86' S. Sunzu

Rufaro Stadium, Harare
Referee: Ebrahim Abdul Basit (South Africa)

26 October 2009
13:30

South Africa	2–0	Angola
Makhanya 67'; Manyisa 80'

Barbourfields Stadium, Bulawayo
Referee: Rajindraparsad Seechurn (Mauritius)

26 October 2009
15:30

Zimbabwe	1–0	Botswana
Maphosa 88'

Barbourfields Stadium, Bulawayo
Referee: Helder Martins de Carvalho (Angola)

=== Semi-finals ===
28 October 2009
15:00

South Africa	1–1	Zimbabwe
Bacela 37'		54' Marufu
Penalties
	2–3

Rufaro Stadium, Harare
Attendance: 25,000
Referee: Rajindraparsad Seechurn (Mauritius)

29 October 2009
15:00

Mozambique	0–2	Zambia
		8' Sakala; 84' F. Sunzu

Barbourfields Stadium, Bulawayo
Referee: Tebogo Israel Ramocha (Botswana)

=== 3rd place ===
31 October 2009
15:00

South Africa	0–1	Mozambique
		82' Hagi

Barbourfields Stadium, Bulawayo
Referee: Tebogo Israel Ramocha (Botswana)

=== Final ===
1 November 2009
15:00

Zimbabwe	3–1	Zambia
Mushekwi 27', 36'; Malajila 45'	Match Report	Banda 25'

Rufaro Stadium, Harare
Attendance: 35.000
Referee: Helder Martins de Carvalho (Angola)

== Goalscorers ==
4 goals:

- (Zimbabwe) Cuthbert Malajila

2 goals:

- (Lesotho) Thabiso Maile
- (Eswatini) Mathokoza Thwala
- (Zimbabwe) Nyasha Mushekwi

1 goal:

- (Botswana) Malepa Bolelang
- (Botswana) Pontsho Moloi
- (Botswana) Mosimanegape Ramoshibidu
- (Comoros) Ahmed Ali
- (Comoros) Mohamed Mouigini
- (Lesotho) Mokone Marabe
- (Mozambique) Momed Hagi
- (Mozambique) Josemar
- (Seychelles) Don Anakora
- (Seychelles) Nelson Laurence
- (Eswatini) Malungisa Dlamini
- (Eswatini) Mfanzile Dlamini
- (Eswatini) Ndoda Mthethwa
- (Zambia) Henry Banda
- (Zambia) Enock Sakala
- (Zambia) Felix Sunzu
- (Zambia) Stophira Sunzu
- (Zimbabwe) Evans Gwekwerere
- (Zimbabwe) Mthulisi Maphosa
- (Zimbabwe) Phillip Marufu
- (Zimbabwe) Method Mwanjali
- (South Africa) Lennox Bacela
- (South Africa) Joseph Makhanya
- (South Africa) Oupa Manyisa
