= Fabio Costa =

Fabio Costa may refer to:

- Fabio Costa (composer, conductor) (born 1971), Brazilian-born composer/conductor
- Fábio Costa (born 1977), Brazilian goalkeeper
- Fábio Bittencourt da Costa (born 1977), Brazilian football midfielder
- Fabio Costa, Brazilian designer who participated in Project Runway (season 10)
- Delegado Fabio Costa, (born 1980), a Brazilian politician
