= 2010 FIFA World Cup qualification – CAF first round =

Football tournament qualification stage

This page provides the summaries of the CAF first round matches for the 2010 FIFA World Cup qualification and the 2010 African Cup of Nations.

== Format ==
Five knockout ties were originally required, involving the ten lowest ranked African countries (based on FIFA rankings as of July 2007). The actual draw was apparently conducted one day before the format was announced by CAF. The pairings were:

- Madagascar v. Comoros
- Somalia v. Swaziland
- São Tomé and Príncipe v. Central African Republic
- Sierra Leone v. Guinea-Bissau
- Seychelles v. Djibouti

São Tomé and Príncipe and the Central African Republic both withdrew in early September 2007. As a result, Swaziland and Seychelles (the two highest-ranked of the ten nations) were no longer required to play in this round, and the teams they were originally matched against, Somalia and Djibouti, were pitched against each other instead. The tie was played as a single game in Djibouti; Somalia was not deemed safe due to the ongoing war.

The winners advanced to the second round.

== Matches ==
Team 1	Agg.	Team 2	1st leg	2nd leg
Madagascar	10–2	Comoros	6–2	4–0
Djibouti	1–0 (Note: This tie was played as a one leg tie in Djibouti, as Somalia was not deemed suitable for FIFA matches.)	Somalia	1–0	—
Sierra Leone	1–0	Guinea-Bissau	1–0	0–0

14 October 2007
14:30 UTC+3

Madagascar	6 – 2	Comoros
Andriantsima 30', 40', 49' (pen.), 57'; Rakotomandimby 65'; Tsaralaza 79'	Report	Midtadi 6'; Ibor 53' (pen.)

Mahamasina Municipal Stadium, Antananarivo
Attendance: 7,754
Referee: Wellington Kaoma (Zambia)
17 November 2007
15:00 UTC+3

Comoros	0 – 4	Madagascar
	Report	Nomenjanaharay 38', 52'; Rakotomandimby 62'; Robson 74'

Stade Said Mohamed Cheikh, Mitsamiouli
Attendance: 1,610
Referee: Jerome Damon (South Africa)

Madagascar won 10 – 2 on aggregate and advanced to the second round.

16 November 2007
16:00 UTC+3

Djibouti	1 – 0	Somalia
H. Yassin 84'	Report

El Hadj Hassan Gouled, Djibouti
Attendance: 10,000
Referee: Khalid Abdel Rahman (Sudan)

Djibouti advanced to the second round. This tie was played as a one leg tie in Djibouti, as Somalia was not deemed suitable for FIFA matches.

17 October 2007
16:30 UTC+0

Sierra Leone	1 – 0	Guinea-Bissau
Conteh 15'	Report

National Stadium, Freetown
Attendance: 25,000
Referee: Sule Mana (Nigeria)
17 November 2007
16:30 UTC+0

Guinea-Bissau	0 – 0	Sierra Leone
	Report

Estádio 24 de Setembro, Bissau
Attendance: 12,000
Referee: Josepf Odartei (Ghana)

Sierra Leone won 1 – 0 on aggregate and advanced to the second round.

== Goalscorers ==
There were 14 goals scored in 5 matches, for an average of 2.8 goals per match.

4 goals

- (Madagascar) Faneva Imà Andriantsima

2 goals

- (Madagascar) Lalaina Nomenjanahary
- (Madagascar) Rija Rakotomandimby

1 goal

- (Comoros) Bakar Ibor
- (Comoros) Daoud Midtadi
- (Djibouti) Hussein Yassin
- (Madagascar) Hubert Robson
- (Madagascar) Jean Tsaralaza
- (Sierra Leone) Kewullay Conteh
