= Mthulisi Maphosa =

Zimbabwean footballer (born 1983)

Personal information
- Full name: Mthulisi Reginalds Maphosa
- Date of birth: 20 March 1983 (age 43)
- Place of birth: Bulawayo, Zimbabwe
- Height: 1.70 m (5 ft 7 in)
- Position: Midfielder

Senior career*
Years	Team	Apps	(Gls)
2003	Sporting Lions F.C.		
2004–2009	Monomotapa United F.C.		
2010	TP Mazembe		
2011	F.C. Platinum		
2011–2015	Highlanders F.C.		
2016	Bulawayo City F.C.		
2017	Bulawayo Chiefs F.C.		

International career
2008–2009	Zimbabwe	4	(1)
- * Club domestic league appearances and goals

Mthulisi Maphosa (born 20 March 1983) is a retired Zimbabwean football midfielder. A Zimbabwe international, he played at the 2008 and 2009 COSAFA Cup.
