= Gcina =

Gcina is an African given name. Notable people with the name include:

- Gcina Mazibuko (born 1983), Swaziland football striker
- Gcina Mhlope (born 1958), South African anti-apartheid activist, actress, storyteller, poet, and playwright
- Gcina Nkosi (born 1949), South African actress
