= Marabe =

Marabe is a surname. Notable people with the surname include:

- Larsen Marabe (born 1986), Papua New Guinean rugby league footballer
- Litsepe Marabe (born 1992), Lesotho footballer
- Mokone Marabe (born 1990), Lesotho footballer
