= Ngatjizeko =

Ngatjizeko is a surname. Notable people with the surname include:

- Immanuel Ngatjizeko (1952–2022), Namibian politician
- Jamuovandu Ngatjizeko (born 1984), Namibian footballer
