= Velocitas =

Velocitas is the name of:

- Velocitas F.C., South African football club
- Velocitas 1897, Dutch football club
- Treno Alta Velocità, Italian company
