= Kabirou =

Kabirou is a surname. Notable people with the surname include:

- Koutche Kabirou (born 1993), Beninese footballer
- Moussoro Kabirou (born 1983), Cameroonian footballer
