= Malá (footballer) =

Bissau-Guinean footballer (born 1979)

Personal information
- Full name: Muhamed Lamine Jabula Sanó
- Date of birth: December 6, 1979 (age 46)
- Place of birth: Bissau, Guinea-Bissau
- Height: 1.85 m (6 ft 1 in)
- Position: Midfielder

Senior career*
Years	Team	Apps	(Gls)
1998–2001	Amora	33	(8)
1999–2000	→ Atlético CP (loan)	29	(1)
2001–2003	Odivelas	51	(3)
2004–2005	Beira-Mar	10	(0)
2005–2007	Estoril Praia	47	(3)
2007	Farul Constanţa	12	(0)
2008	Ceahlăul Piatra Neamţ	9	(0)
2008–2009	Bacău	0	(0)
2009	Mafra	6	(0)
2009–2010	Doxa Katokopia	13	(1)

International career
2007	Guinea-Bissau	2	(0)
- * Club domestic league appearances and goals as of May 18, 2010

Muhamed Lamine Jabula Sanó (born 6 December 1979 in Bissau), commonly known as Malá, is a retired Bissau-Guinean football midfielder. He played in the top leagues of Portugal, Romania and Cyprus, and was also capped for the national team.

== International career ==
Malá represented Guinea-Bissau in the 2010 FIFA World Cup qualification first round, a double fixture against Sierra Leone, which Guinea-Bissau lost on aggregate and was eliminated from the qualification.
