= Mazibuko =

Mazibuko is a South African surname that may refer to:

- Abednego Mazibuko, South African singer
- Albert Mazibuko, South African singer, brother of Abednego
- Clement Mazibuko (born 1977), South African football midfielder
- Fusi Mazibuko (born 1980), South African basketball player
- Gcina Mazibuko (born 1983), Swaziland football striker
- Goodman Mazibuko (born 1975), South African football midfielder
- Lindiwe Mazibuko (born 1980), South African politician and musician
- Seth Mazibuko, South African anti-apartheid activists
- Vusumuzi Mazibuko (born 1984), South African cricketer
