= Edmore Chirambadare =

Zimbabwean footballer (born 1992)

Personal information
- Date of birth: 24 January 1992 (age 34)
- Place of birth: Gweru, Zimbabwe
- Position: Winger

Team information
- Current team: Magesi

Youth career
- 2005: Bristol City

Senior career*
Years	Team	Apps	(Gls)
2010	BOC		
2011	Zim Alloys	0	(0)
- → Gweru Pirates (loan)
2012	Silo United		
2013–2014	Tsholotsho FC		(13)
2015–2016	Chicken Inn		
2016–2018	Kaizer Chiefs	23	(0)
2018–2019	Maccabi FC	19	(1)
2019–2020	Real Kings	4	(0)
2023	Venda Football Academy	10	(4)
2024–	Magesi	15	(5)

International career
2015–2016	Zimbabwe	6	(0)
- * Club domestic league appearances and goals as of 6 May 2018

FC Magesi Edmore Chirambadare (born 24 January 1992 in Gweru, Zimbabwe) is a left-footed Zimbabwean professional footballer who plays as a winger for Magesi. Nicknamed "Spanner" by his teammates, he was mostly known for his goalscoring adroitness back in Zimbabwe.

The Gweru local sees Zimbabwean former footballer Peter Ndlovu as his main inspiration.

== Early life ==
Born in Gweru, the former Takunda Primary and Mkoba 3 High School student was raised solely by his mother Georgina Kunene after the passing of his father in his early childhood.

== Career ==
=== Youth ===
Aged 17, the national team player also represented Midlands Province in the Zimbabwe National Youth Games where he was spotted by Tsholotsho F.C. coach Lizwe Sweswe who identified him as someone he could build his team around. Lizwe ended up buying Chirmabadare in 2013.

=== Zimbabwe ===
The winger joined Zimbabwean lower-league side Zim Alloys in 2011 but was overlooked by the coach which chagrined him deeply. Begrudgingly, Chirmabadare opted to work as a barman for six months in his hometown of Gweru before proceeding to move to Gweru Pirates on a loan spell. Not long after, he was sold to Silo United before sealing a move to Tsholtsho F.C. of the Zimbabwe Division 1 where he scored 13 goals,(in his second year following a stint at Highlands F.C.) earning them automatic promotion. Owing to his form, Chicken Inn coach Joey Antipas decided to scout him in a match facing Black boots F.C. where he scored a brace. Because of his performance there, he was bought by Chicken Inn F.C. in 2015 and delivered 11 goals in his first season there, scoring three goals in his first five games and netting the fastest goal of the season on his debut in a 2–1 victory over Flame Lilly FC. As a result, he became the most sought-for player in the Zimbabwe Premier Soccer League at the time.

=== Kaizer Chiefs ===
Following a trial with the Soweto-based club, Chirambadare signed a three-year contract with the Amakhosi along with Zimbabwean Michelle Katsvairo in 2016, authoring his first goal in the quarter-final of the 2016 Telkom Knockout where Kaizer Chiefs lost on penalties to Free State Stars.

Although Chirambadare did not manage a league goal in his first seventeen appearances at Kaizer Chiefs, he adapted well to the club and cemented his place as a regular starter in the lineup and won the 2016-17 Kaizer Chiefs Most Improved Player award.

Back in 2016, the offensive player trialed for Bidvest Wits but he never made the transfer.

== Personal life ==
While plying his trade for Chicken Inn, the Zimbabwean playmaker shared a house with teammate David Tenwanjira. A devout Christian, he was raised on the Masowe Echishanu Apostolic Church before moving on to the Methodist Church.

His interests include pool, darts and chess.

His late father Peter and his cousins Stanley, Ernest, and Shepherd were all footballers.

== Individual awards ==
- 2016-17 Kaizer Chiefs Most Improved Player
- ZIFA Southern region Golden Boot(1): 2014
