= Delegado Fabio Costa =

Brazilian politician (born 1977)

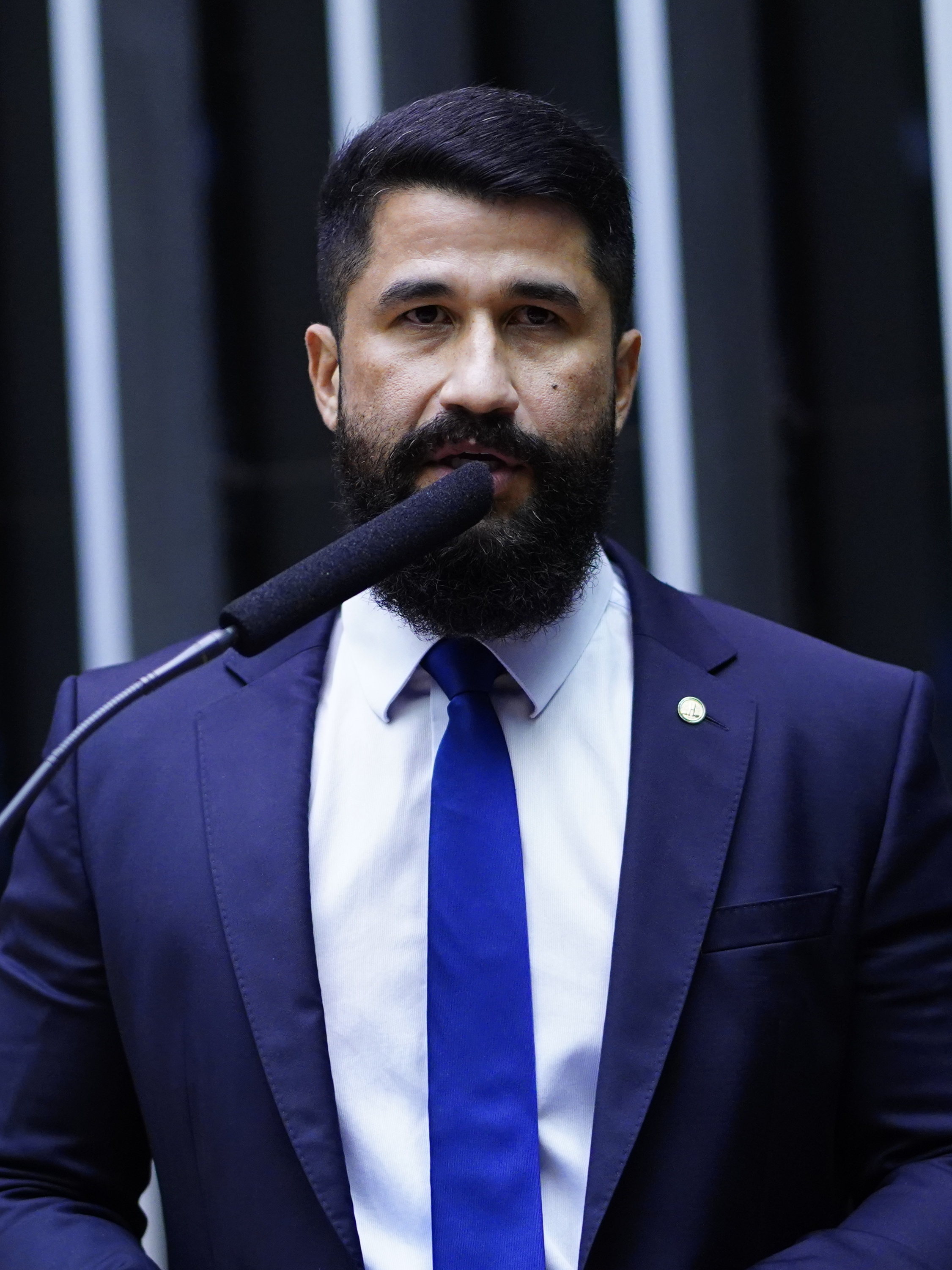
- Costa in 2023

Member of the Chamber of Deputies
- Incumbent
- Assumed office 1 February 2023
- Constituency: Alagoas

Member of the Municipal Chamber of Maceió
- In office 1 January 2021 – 1 February 2023
- Constituency: At-large

Personal details
- Born: Fábio Michey Costa da Silva; 15 October 1980 (age 46) Recife, Pernambuco, Brazil
- Party: PP (since 2022)
- Other political affiliations: PSB (until 2022)
- Education: Centro Universitário Cesmac; Anhanguera-Uniderp University
- Profession: Police officer

Fábio Michey Costa Da Silva (born October 15, 1980, in Recife) is a police officer and a Brazilian politician, he is a member of the Progressistas (PP) party.

He is a presently a Federal Deputy of Alagoas.

== Biography ==
Costa is a police officer, he joined the Brazilian Socialist Party in 2020 to run for city councilor of Maceió in the 2020 elections, where he received the most votes with 12,038 votes (3.26%).

He joined the Progressistas party in 2022 and ran for Federal Deputy for Alagoas, being elected with 60,767 votes (3.67%)

== Electoral results ==
| Year | Election | Party | Office | Votes | Percent | Result |
|---|---|---|---|---|---|---|
| 2020 | Municipal Election of Maceió | PSB | Councillor | 12,038 | 3.06% | Elected |
| 2022 | State Elections of Alagoas | PP | Federal Deputy | 60,767 | 3.67% | Elected |
| 2026 | State Elections of Alagoas | PP | Federal Deputy | 165,649 | 9.21% | Elected |
