= John Arwuah =

Ghanaian footballer

Personal information
- Full name: John Junior Arwuah
- Date of birth: September 1, 1985 (age 41)
- Place of birth: Accra, Ghana
- Height: 1.79 m (5 ft 10 1/2 in)
- Position: Midfielder

Senior career*
Years	Team	Apps	(Gls)
2003	Achimpim Stars		
2004–2005	MK Land FC		
2005–2006	Tembisa Classic		
2007–2008	Durban Stars FC	24	(2)
2008–2011	Maritzburg United	55	(3)
2011–2012	SuperSport United	8	(0)
2012–2014	Bloemfontein Celtic	36	(0)
2014–2015	AmaZulu F.C.	34	(0)
2015	AEL Limassol	4	(0)

International career
	Ghana U-17	8	(3)
- * Club domestic league appearances and goals as of 20:39, 6 December 2015 (UTC)

John Junior Arwuah (born September 1, 1985 in Accra) is a Ghanaian footballer who plays as a midfielder.

== Career ==
Arwuah came to South Africa in 2005 and was signed by Tembisa Classic and then signed for newly promoted team Durban Stars in June 2006, only for its franchise to be sold to Maritzburg United in 2008. On 29 June 2011 Arwuah left Maritzburg United F.C. and joined to South African Premier Soccer League rival SuperSport United F.C. In July 2012, Arwuah agreed to contract with Bloemfontein Celtic.

=== Position ===
Arwuah is a midfielder who can play defensive or central midfielder.

== International career ==
He is former Ghana national under-17 football team player.

== Personal life ==
He is the cousin of fellow Ghanaian footballer Samuel Darpoh.
