= Mfanzile Dlamini =

Liswati footballer

Personal information
- Date of birth: 18 February 1983 (age 43)
- Place of birth: Bhunya, Swaziland
- Position: Striker

Youth career
- Bhunya Police
- Mhlambanyatsi Rovers

Senior career*
Years	Team	Apps	(Gls)
2000–2001	Mhlambanyatsi Rovers		
2001–2003	Tembisa Classic		
- → Louisiana Outlaws
2003–2007	Mhlambanyatsi Rovers		
2007–	Royal Leopards		

International career
1998–2009	Swaziland	35	(9)
- * Club domestic league appearances and goals

Mfanzile Dlamini (born 18 February 1983) is a Liswati former footballer who played as a striker.

== International goals ==
Scores and results list Swaziland's goal tally first, score column indicates score after each Dlamini goal.

List of international goals scored by Mfanzile Dlamini
No.	Date	Venue	Opponent	Score	Result	Competition	Ref.
1	2 August 1998	Somhlolo National Stadium, Lobamba, Eswatini	Madagascar	1-1	1-2	2000 African Cup of Nations qualification	
2	2 July 2000	Somhlolo National Stadium, Lobamba, Eswatini	Kenya	2-1	3-2	2002 African Cup of Nations qualification	
3	21 April 2002	Somhlolo National Stadium, Lobamba, Eswatini	Namibia	1-0	2-1	2002 COSAFA Cup	
4	21 April 2002	Somhlolo National Stadium, Lobamba, Eswatini	Namibia	2-1	2-1	2002 COSAFA Cup	
5	19 March 2003	Somhlolo National Stadium, Lobamba, Eswatini	Lesotho	1-0	1-0	Friendly	
6	30 March 2003	Somhlolo National Stadium, Lobamba, Eswatini	DR Congo	1-0	1-1	2004 African Cup of Nations qualification	
7	13 July 2003	Somhlolo National Stadium, Lobamba, Eswatini	Madagascar	2-0	2-0	2003 COSAFA Cup	
8	23 July 2008	Witbank Stadium, eMalahleni, South Africa	Seychelles	1-0	1-0	2008 COSAFA Cup qualification	
9	18 October 2009	Barbourfields Stadium, Bulawayo, Zimbabwe	Seychelles	2-1	2-1	2009 COSAFA Cup	
