= Evans Gwekwerere =

Zimbabwean footballer (born 1985)

Personal information
- Date of birth: 27 April 1985 (age 41)
- Place of birth: Makonde, Zimbabwe
- Height: 1.86 m (6 ft 1 in)
- Position: Forward

Senior career*
| Years | Team | Apps | (Gls) |
| 2004 | Douglas Warriors F.C. | | |
| 2005–2006 | Dynamos F.C. | | |
| 2006–2008 | Moroka Swallows F.C. | | |
| 2008 | F.C. AK | | |
| 2009 | Jomo Cosmos F.C. | | |
| 2009–2010 | Dynamos F.C. | | |
| 2011–2012 | CAPS United F.C. | | |
| 2013 | Dynamos F.C. | | |
| 2013 | Township Rollers F.C. | | |
| 2013 | Black Mambas F.C. | | |
| 2014 | Buffaloes F.C. | | |
| 2014 | Textáfrica do Chimoio | | |
| 2015 | Ferroviário de Maputo | | |
| 2016 | Dynamos F.C. | | |

International career
| 2006–2009 | Zimbabwe | 11 | (4) |
- * Club domestic league appearances and goals

Evans Gwekwerere (born 27 April 1985) is a retired Zimbabwean football striker. A Zimbabwe international, he played at the 2009 COSAFA Cup.
