= Thabiso Maile =

Lesotho footballer (born 1987)

Personal information
- Full name: Thabiso Maile
- Date of birth: 27 January 1987 (age 39)
- Place of birth: Lesotho
- Position: Defender

Team information
- Current team: Lerotholi Polytechnic

Senior career*
Years	Team	Apps	(Gls)
2005–2007	Likhopo Maseru		
2007–	Lerotholi Polytechnic		

International career^{‡}
2006–2013	Lesotho	15	(3)
- * Club domestic league appearances and goals ‡ National team caps and goals as of 2 September 2025

Thabiso Maile (born 27 January 1987) is a Mosotho footballer who currently plays as a defender for Lerotholi Polytechnic. He has won seven caps and scored two goals for the Lesotho national football team since 2006.

== Career statistics ==
=== International ===
Appearances and goals by national team and year
National team	Year	Apps	Goals
Lesotho
Lesotho	2006	4	0
Lesotho	2007	2	0
Lesotho	2008	1	0
Lesotho	2009	2	2
Lesotho	2011	1	0
Lesotho	2012	1	1
Lesotho	2013	4	0
Total		15	3

Scores and results list Lesotho's goal tally first, score column indicates score after each Maile goal.

List of international goals scored by Thabiso Maile
No.	Date	Venue	Opponent	Score	Result	Competition	Ref.
1	19 October 2009	Rufaro Stadium, Harare, Zimbabwe	Zimbabwe	1–1	2–2	2009 COSAFA Cup	
2	19 October 2009	Rufaro Stadium, Harare, Zimbabwe	Zimbabwe	2–2	2–2	2009 COSAFA Cup	
3	17 July 2012	Molepolole Stadium, Molepolole, Botswana	Zimbabwe	2–1	3–5	Friendly	
