= Thabane Rankara =

Mosotho footballer (born 1978)

Personal information
- Full name: Thabane Rankara
- Date of birth: 12 March 1978 (age 48)
- Place of birth: Lesotho
- Position: Striker

Team information
- Current team: Lesotho Prison Service

Senior career*
Years	Team	Apps	(Gls)
2007–	Lesotho Prison Service	74	(31)

International career^{‡}
2008–	Lesotho	11	(3)
- * Club domestic league appearances and goals ‡ National team caps and goals as of 16:27, 23 December 2009 (UTC)

Thabane Rankara (born 12 March 1978) is a Mosotho footballer who currently plays as a striker for Lesotho Prison Service. He has won 11 caps and scored three goals for the Lesotho national football team.

== International career ==
=== International goals ===
Scores and results list Lesotho's goal tally first.

No	Date	Venue	Opponent	Score	Result	Competition
1.	21 May 2008	Estádio da Machava, Matola, Mozambique	Mozambique	2–1	3–2	Friendly
2.	21 May 2008	Estádio da Machava, Matola, Mozambique	Mozambique	3–2	3–2	Friendly
3.	22 July 2008	Lilian Ngoyi Stadium, Secunda, South Africa	Namibia	1–1	1–1	2008 COSAFA Cup
