= Phillip Marufu =

Zimbabwean footballer (born 1984)

Personal information
- Date of birth: 10 January 1984 (age 42)
- Place of birth: Gweru, Zimbabwe
- Height: 1.69 m (5 ft 7 in)
- Position: Forward

Team information
- Current team: Chapungu United F.C.

Senior career*
Years	Team	Apps	(Gls)
2002–2008	Chapungu United F.C.		
2008–2009	Dynamos F.C.		
2009	→ Highlanders F.C.		
2010–2012	FC Saint-Éloi Lupopo		
2012–2013	Chapungu United F.C.		
2014	Black Rhinos F.C.		
2015–	Chapungu United F.C.		

International career
2006–2009	Zimbabwe	9	(0)
- * Club domestic league appearances and goals

Phillip Marufu (born 10 January 1984) is a Zimbabwean football striker who currently plays for Chapungu United F.C. A Zimbabwe international, he played at the 2006 and 2009 COSAFA Cup.
