= Stade de Moroni =

Sports venue in Moroni, Comoros

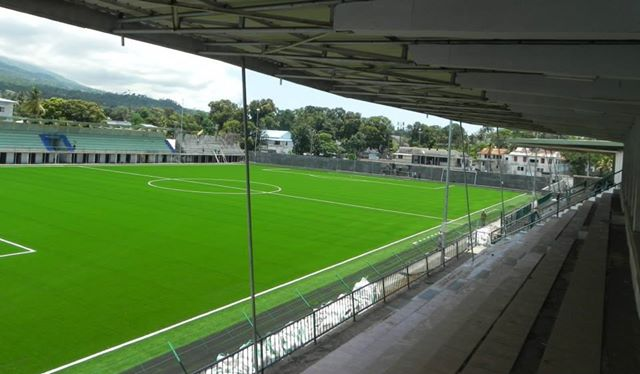
- Interactive map of Stade de Moroni
- Full name: Stade de Moroni
- Location: Moroni, Comoros
- Coordinates: 11°42′39.4862″S 43°14′41.6082″E
- Capacity: 3,000
- Surface: Artificial turf

Tenant
- Comoros national football team

Stade de Moroni is a multi-use stadium in Moroni, Comoros. It is currently used mostly for athletics competitions. Next to it is a football stadium Stade de Beaumer.
