= 2010 FIFA World Cup qualification (CAF) =

Tournament details
- Dates: 14 October 2007 – 18 November 2009
- Teams: 51 (from 1 confederation)

Tournament statistics
- Matches played: 202
- Goals scored: 505 (2.5 per match)
- Attendance: 4,219,427 (20,888 per match)
- Top scorer(s): (Burkina Faso) Moumouni Dagano (12 goals)

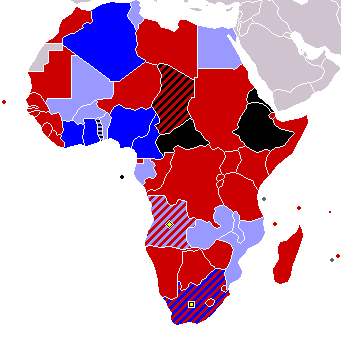
Result: Countries that qualified for the 2010 World Cup and 2010 African Cup of Nations Countries that qualified for the 2010 African Cup of Nations Countries that did not qualify for the 2010 World Cup or 2010 African Cup of Nations Countries that withdrew or were disqualified ■ Host nation of the 2010 World Cup ◆ Host nation of the 2010 African Cup of Nations

The Confederation of African Football (CAF) section of the 2010 FIFA World Cup qualification saw teams compete for five berths in the final tournament in South Africa. The qualification stage doubled as the qualification stage for the 2010 African Cup of Nations, with fifteen teams qualifying for the finals held in Angola.

In total, 53 nations participated; however, due to the presence of the two tournaments' respective hosts, 52 teams were involved in each competition. South Africa qualified automatically as host for the World Cup, and Angola qualified as host for the African Cup of Nations. Both nevertheless competed in the qualifying phase to attempt to qualify for the other tournament.

This was the first time since 1934 that the hosts would compete in World Cup qualifiers. Angola's situation mirrored that of Egypt in the 2006 World Cup qualifiers in Africa, which doubled as the qualifiers to the 2006 African Cup of Nations hosted by Egypt.

== First round ==
Five knockout ties were originally required, involving the ten lowest ranked African countries (based on FIFA rankings as of July 2007). The actual draw was apparently conducted one day before the format was announced by CAF. The pairings were:

- Madagascar v. Comoros
- Somalia v. Swaziland
- São Tomé and Príncipe v. Central African Republic
- Sierra Leone v. Guinea-Bissau
- Seychelles v. Djibouti

São Tomé and Príncipe and the Central African Republic both withdrew in early September 2007. As a result, Swaziland and Seychelles (the two highest-ranked of the ten nations) were no longer required to play in this round, and the teams they were originally matched against, Somalia and Djibouti, were pitched against each other instead. The tie was played as a single game in Djibouti; Somalia was not deemed safe due to the ongoing war.

Team 1	Agg.	Team 2	1st leg	2nd leg
Madagascar	10–2	Comoros	6–2	4–0
Djibouti	1–0	Somalia	—	—
Sierra Leone	1–0	Guinea-Bissau	1–0	0–0

== Second round ==
The 48 qualifiers (45 direct entrants plus 3 winners of the first round) were split into 12 groups of 4 teams each in the draw held in Durban, South Africa on 25 November 2007. Teams in each group played a home-and-away round-robin in 2008, with the 12 groups winners and 8 best runners-up advancing to the third round. As not all groups were of equal size after the exclusion of Ethiopia and the withdrawal of Eritrea, when ranking the runners-up, their results against their group's 4th-placed team were not counted.

=== Seeding ===
One team from each of the following pots were drawn into each group.

Pot A	Pot B	Pot C	Pot D
Cameroon; Nigeria; Ivory Coast; Morocco; Ghana; Tunisia; Egypt; Guinea; Senegal; Mali; Angola; Togo	Zambia; South Africa; Cape Verde; DR Congo; Algeria; Burkina Faso; Benin; Mozambique; Libya; Ethiopia; Congo; Zimbabwe	Uganda; Botswana; Equatorial Guinea; Tanzania; Gabon; Malawi; Sudan; Burundi; Liberia; Rwanda; Eritrea; Namibia	Gambia; Mauritania; Kenya; Chad; Lesotho; Mauritius; Niger; Swaziland; Seychelles; Sierra Leone; Madagascar; Djibouti

=== Group 1 ===
Team	Pld	W	D	L	GF	GA	GD	Pts	Qualification	(Cameroon)	(Cape Verde)	(Tanzania)	(Mauritius)
Cameroon	6	5	1	0	14	2	+12	16	Advance to third round	—	2–0	2–1	5–0
Cape Verde	6	3	0	3	7	8	−1	9		1–2	—	1–0	3–1
Tanzania	6	2	2	2	9	6	+3	8		0–0	3–1	—	1–1
Mauritius	6	0	1	5	3	17	−14	1		0–3	0–1	1–4	—

=== Group 2 ===
Team	Pld	W	D	L	GF	GA	GD	Pts	Qualification	(Guinea)	(Kenya)	(Zimbabwe)	(Namibia)
Guinea	6	3	2	1	9	5	+4	11	Advance to third round	—	3–2	0–0	4–0
Kenya	6	3	1	2	8	5	+3	10	Advance to third round	2–0	—	2–0	1–0
Zimbabwe	6	1	3	2	4	6	−2	6		0–0	0–0	—	2–0
Namibia	6	2	0	4	7	12	−5	6		1–2	2–1	4–2	—

=== Group 3 ===
Team	Pld	W	D	L	GF	GA	GD	Pts	Qualification	(Benin)	(Angola)	(Uganda)	(Niger)
Benin	6	4	0	2	12	8	+4	12	Advance to third round	—	3–2	4–1	2–0
Angola	6	3	1	2	11	8	+3	10		3–0	—	0–0	3–1
Uganda	6	3	1	2	8	9	−1	10		2–1	3–1	—	1–0
Niger	6	1	0	5	5	11	−6	3		0–2	1–2	3–1	—

Note: Angola were automatically qualified as hosts of the 2010 African Cup of Nations. However, they were subject to the same rules as other nations for continuation to the next stage of the qualifiers. Failure to advance from this group eliminated them from the qualifiers for the 2010 FIFA World Cup.

=== Group 4 ===
Team	Pld	W	D	L	GF	GA	GD	Pts	Qualification	(Nigeria)	(South Africa)	(Sierra Leone)	(Equatorial Guinea)
Nigeria	6	6	0	0	11	1	+10	18	Advance to third round	—	2–0	4–1	2–0
South Africa	6	2	1	3	5	5	0	7		0–1	—	0–0	4–1
Sierra Leone	6	2	1	3	4	8	−4	7		0–1	1–0	—	2–1
Equatorial Guinea	6	1	0	5	4	10	−6	3		0–1	0–1	2–0	—

Note: South Africa were automatically qualified as hosts of the 2010 FIFA World Cup. However, they were subject to the same rules as other nations for continuation to the next stage of the qualifiers. Failure to advance from this group eliminated them from the qualifiers for the 2010 African Cup of Nations.

=== Group 5 ===
Team	Pld	W	D	L	GF	GA	GD	Pts	Qualification	(Ghana)	(Gabon)	(Libya)	(Lesotho)
Ghana	6	4	0	2	11	5	+6	12	Advance to third round	—	2–0	3–0	3–0
Gabon	6	4	0	2	8	3	+5	12	Advance to third round	2–0	—	1–0	2–0
Libya	6	4	0	2	7	4	+3	12		1–0	1–0	—	4–0
Lesotho	6	0	0	6	2	16	−14	0		2–3	0–3	0–1	—

=== Group 6 ===
Team	Pld	W	D	L	GF	GA	GD	Pts	Qualification	(Algeria)	(The Gambia)	(Senegal)	(Liberia)
Algeria	6	3	1	2	7	4	+3	10	Advance to third round	—	1–0	3–2	3–0
Gambia	6	2	3	1	6	3	+3	9		1–0	—	0–0	3–0
Senegal	6	2	3	1	9	7	+2	9		1–0	1–1	—	3–1
Liberia	6	0	3	3	4	12	−8	3		0–0	1–1	2–2	—

=== Group 7 ===
Team	Pld	W	D	L	GF	GA	GD	Pts	Qualification	(Ivory Coast)	(Mozambique)	(Madagascar)	(Botswana)
Ivory Coast	6	3	3	0	10	2	+8	12	Advance to third round	—	1–0	3–0	4–0
Mozambique	6	2	2	2	7	5	+2	8	Advance to third round	1–1	—	3–0	1–2
Madagascar	6	1	3	2	2	7	−5	6		0–0	1–1	—	1–0
Botswana	6	1	2	3	3	8	−5	5		1–1	0–1	0–0	—

On 19 March 2007, FIFA announced the immediate suspension of the Malagasy Football Federation (FMF). The suspension was lifted on 19 May 2008.

=== Group 8 ===
Team	Pld	W	D	L	GF	GA	GD	Pts	Qualification	(Morocco)	(Rwanda)	(Mauritania)	(Ethiopia)
Morocco	4	3	0	1	11	5	+6	9	Advance to third round	—	2–0	4–1	~~3–0~~
Rwanda	4	3	0	1	7	3	+4	9	Advance to third round	3–1	—	3–0	~~Canc.~~
Mauritania	4	0	0	4	2	12	−10	0		1–4	0–1	—	~~0–1~~
Ethiopia (Note: Ethiopia were excluded from the competition due to FIFA's suspension of the Ethiopian Football Federation on 29 July 2008, and the results of their matches were annulled.)	0	0	0	0	0	0	0	0	Suspended	~~Canc.~~	~~1–2~~	~~6–1~~	—

Notes:

Ethiopia played four matches in this group, before FIFA announced the immediate suspension of the Ethiopian Football Federation (EFF) on 29 July 2008. On 12 September 2008, FIFA excluded the EFF from the 2010 World Cup qualifiers and the results of their matches were cancelled. While it was not clear if they were also explicitly excluded from the 2010 African Cup of Nations, their failure to complete the remaining fixtures effectively eliminated them from the tournament.

=== Group 9 ===
Team	Pld	W	D	L	GF	GA	GD	Pts	Qualification	(Burkina Faso)	(Tunisia)	(Burundi)	(Seychelles)
Burkina Faso	6	5	1	0	14	5	+9	16	Advance to third round	—	0–0	2–0	4–1
Tunisia	6	4	1	1	11	3	+8	13	Advance to third round	1–2	—	2–1	5–0
Burundi	6	2	0	4	5	9	−4	6		1–3	0–1	—	1–0
Seychelles	6	0	0	6	4	17	−13	0		2–3	0–2	1–2	—

=== Group 10 ===
Team	Pld	W	D	L	GF	GA	GD	Pts	Qualification	(Mali)	(Sudan)	(Republic of the Congo)	(Chad)
Mali	6	4	0	2	13	8	+5	12	Advance to third round	—	3–0	4–2	2–1
Sudan	6	3	0	3	9	9	0	9	Advance to third round	3–2	—	2–0	1–2
Congo	6	3	0	3	7	8	−1	9		1–0	1–0	—	2–0
Chad	6	2	0	4	7	11	−4	6		1–2	1–3	2–1	—

On 28 March 2008, FIFA announced the immediate suspension of the Chadian Football Federation. The suspension was lifted on 7 May 2008.

Chad was disqualified from the 2010 African Nations Cup qualifiers after failing to show up for their away match against Sudan, despite security guarantees. The match was subsequently rescheduled. Only matches between Mali, Sudan and Congo were taken into account for the qualification of the second round of the preliminaries of the African Cup of Nations. However, Chad was still able qualify for the 2010 FIFA World Cup. This could have led to complications if Chad had advanced to the next round or if Chad's exclusion the now alternate group standings had produced different group winners and impacted on the ranking of the second-placed side.

For African Cup of Nations qualification:

Team	Pld	W	D	L	GF	GA	GD	Pts	(Mali)	(Sudan)	(Republic of the Congo)
Mali	4	2	0	2	9	6	+3	6 (Note: Mali, Sudan and Congo are ranked by their overall goal difference.)	—	3–0	4–2
Sudan	4	2	0	2	5	6	−1	6	3–2	—	2–0
Congo	4	2	0	2	4	6	−2	6	1–0	1–0	—

=== Group 11 ===
Team	Pld	W	D	L	GF	GA	GD	Pts	Qualification	(Zambia)	(Togo)	(Eswatini)	(Eritrea)
Zambia	4	2	1	1	2	1	+1	7	Advance to third round	—	1–0	1–0	Canc.
Togo	4	2	0	2	8	3	+5	6	Advance to third round	1–0	—	6–0	Canc.
Swaziland	4	1	1	2	2	8	−6	4		0–0	2–1	—	Canc.
Eritrea	0	0	0	0	0	0	0	0	Suspended	Canc.	Canc.	Canc.	—

Eritrea withdrew from the qualifiers on 25 March 2008 and were not replaced.

=== Group 12 ===
Team	Pld	W	D	L	GF	GA	GD	Pts	Qualification	(Egypt)	(Malawi)	(Democratic Republic of the Congo)	(Djibouti)
Egypt	6	5	0	1	13	2	+11	15	Advance to third round	—	2–0	2–1	4–0
Malawi	6	4	0	2	14	5	+9	12	Advance to third round	1–0	—	2–1	8–1
DR Congo	6	3	0	3	14	6	+8	9		0–1	1–0	—	5–1
Djibouti	6	0	0	6	2	30	−28	0		0–4	0–3	0–6	—

=== Rankings of runners-up ===
Along with the 12 group winners, the 8 highest-ranked runners-up also advanced to the third round. Because not all groups contained an equal number of teams, only results against the first- and third-placed teams in each group counted.

Grp	Team	Pld	W	D	L	GF	GA	GD	Pts	Qualification
8	Rwanda	4	3	0	1	7	3	+4	9	Advance to third round
2	Kenya	4	2	1	1	6	3	+3	7	Advance to third round
9	Tunisia	4	2	1	1	4	3	+1	7	Advance to third round
11	Togo	4	2	0	2	8	3	+5	6	Advance to third round
5	Gabon	4	2	0	2	3	3	0	6	Advance to third round
10	Sudan	4	2	0	2	5	6	−1	6	Advance to third round
12	Malawi	4	2	0	2	3	4	−1	6	Advance to third round
7	Mozambique	4	1	2	1	5	3	+2	5	Advance to third round
6	Gambia	4	1	2	1	2	2	0	5	
3	Angola	4	1	1	2	6	6	0	4	
1	Cape Verde	4	1	0	3	3	7	−4	3	
4	South Africa	4	0	1	3	0	4	−4	1	

== Third round ==
The 20 remaining sides were split into five groups of four. The draw for the groups took place on 22 October 2008 in Zürich, Switzerland.

The five group winners qualified for the 2010 FIFA World Cup, and were joined by the group runners-up and third-placed teams in qualifying for the 2010 Africa Cup of Nations.

=== Seeding ===
Teams were seeded based on their FIFA World Rankings in October 2008 (number in parentheses). One team from each of the following pots was drawn into each group.

Pot 1	Pot 2	Pot 3	Pot 4
Cameroon (12); Egypt (22); Ghana (25); Nigeria (27); Ivory Coast (29)	Guinea (41); Morocco (43); Tunisia (47); Mali (53); Algeria (56)	Burkina Faso (63); Gabon (67); Zambia (70); Kenya (79); Benin (81)	Rwanda (87); Togo (91); Mozambique (100); Sudan (106); Malawi (109)

=== Group A ===
Team	Pld	W	D	L	GF	GA	GD	Pts	Qualification	(Cameroon)	(Gabon)	(Togo)	(Morocco)
Cameroon	6	4	1	1	9	2	+7	13	Qualified for the 2010 FIFA World Cup and 2010 Africa Cup of Nations	—	2–1	3–0	0–0
Gabon	6	3	0	3	9	7	+2	9	Qualified for the 2010 Africa Cup of Nations	0–2	—	3–0	3–1
Togo	6	2	2	2	3	7	−4	8	Qualified for the 2010 Africa Cup of Nations	1–0	1–0	—	1–1
Morocco	6	0	3	3	3	8	−5	3		0–2	1–2	0–0	—

=== Group B ===
Team	Pld	W	D	L	GF	GA	GD	Pts	Qualification	(Nigeria)	(Tunisia)	(Mozambique)	(Kenya)
Nigeria	6	3	3	0	9	4	+5	12	Qualified for the 2010 FIFA World Cup and 2010 Africa Cup of Nations	—	2–2	1–0	3–0
Tunisia	6	3	2	1	7	4	+3	11	Qualified for the 2010 Africa Cup of Nations	0–0	—	2–0	1–0
Mozambique	6	2	1	3	3	5	−2	7	Qualified for the 2010 Africa Cup of Nations	0–0	1–0	—	1–0
Kenya	6	1	0	5	5	11	−6	3		2–3	1–2	2–1	—

=== Group C ===
Team	Pld	W	D	L	GF	GA	GD	Pts	Qualification	(Algeria)	(Egypt)	(Zambia)	(Rwanda)
Algeria	6	4	1	1	9	4	+5	13 (Note: Algeria and Egypt finished with identical overall and head-to-head records. Algeria won the tiebreaking play-off 1–0 to qualify for the 2010 FIFA World Cup.)	Qualified for the 2010 FIFA World Cup and 2010 Africa Cup of Nations	—	3–1	1–0	3–1
Egypt	6	4	1	1	9	4	+5	13	Qualified for the 2010 Africa Cup of Nations	2–0	—	1–1	3–0
Zambia	6	1	2	3	2	5	−3	5	Qualified for the 2010 Africa Cup of Nations	0–2	0–1	—	1–0
Rwanda	6	0	2	4	1	8	−7	2		0–0	0–1	0–0	—

=== Group D ===
Team	Pld	W	D	L	GF	GA	GD	Pts	Qualification	(Ghana)	(Benin)	(Mali)	(Sudan)
Ghana	6	4	1	1	9	3	+6	13	Qualified for the 2010 FIFA World Cup and 2010 Africa Cup of Nations	—	1–0	2–2	2–0
Benin	6	3	1	2	6	6	0	10	Qualified for the 2010 Africa Cup of Nations	1–0	—	1–1	1–0
Mali	6	2	3	1	8	7	+1	9	Qualified for the 2010 Africa Cup of Nations	0–2	3–1	—	1–0
Sudan	6	0	1	5	2	9	−7	1		0–2	1–2	1–1	—

=== Group E ===
Team	Pld	W	D	L	GF	GA	GD	Pts	Qualification	(Ivory Coast)	(Burkina Faso)	(Malawi)	(Guinea)
Ivory Coast	6	5	1	0	19	4	+15	16	Qualified for the 2010 FIFA World Cup and 2010 Africa Cup of Nations	—	5–0	5–0	3–0
Burkina Faso	6	4	0	2	10	11	−1	12	Qualified for the 2010 Africa Cup of Nations	2–3	—	1–0	4–2
Malawi	6	1	1	4	4	11	−7	4	Qualified for the 2010 Africa Cup of Nations	1–1	0–1	—	2–1
Guinea	6	1	0	5	7	14	−7	3		1–2	1–2	2–1	—

== Qualified teams ==
The following six teams from CAF qualified for the final tournament.

Team	Qualified as	Qualified on	Previous appearances in FIFA World Cup^{1}
South Africa	Hosts	15 May 2004	2 (1998, 2002)
Cameroon	Third round Group A winners	14 November 2009	5 (1982, 1990, 1994, 1998, 2002)
Nigeria	Third round Group B winners	14 November 2009	3 (1994, 1998, 2002)
Algeria	Tiebreaking play-off winners	18 November 2009	2 (1982, 1986)
Ghana	Third round Group D winners	6 September 2009	1 (2006)
Ivory Coast	Third round Group E winners	10 October 2009	1 (2006)

^{1} Bold indicates champions for that year. Italic indicates hosts for that year.

== Top goalscorers ==
There were 505 goals scored in 202 matches, for an average of 2.5 goals per match.

12 goals

- (Burkina Faso) Moumouni Dagano

9 goals

- (Cameroon) Samuel Eto'o

8 goals

- (Benin) Razak Omotoyossi
- (Mali) Frédéric Kanouté

6 goals

- (Ivory Coast) Didier Drogba
- (Kenya) Dennis Oliech
- (Malawi) Chiukepo Msowoya

5 goals

- (Egypt) Mohamed Aboutrika
- (Ghana) Matthew Amoah
- (Guinea) Ismael Bangoura
- (Guinea) Pascal Feindouno
- (Togo) Emmanuel Adebayor

Below are full goalscorer lists for each round:

- First round
- Second round
- Third round
