= Method Mwanjali =

Zimbabwean footballer (born 1983)

Personal information
- Date of birth: 25 April 1983 (age 43)
- Place of birth: Hwange, Zimbabwe
- Height: 1.75 m (5 ft 9 in)
- Position: Defender

Senior career*
Years	Team	Apps	(Gls)
2002–2003	Wankie		
2004–2005	Shabanie Mine		
2006–2010	CAPS United		
2010–2014	Mamelodi Sundowns	48	(2)
2013–2014	→ Mpumalanga Black Aces (loan)	20	(1)
2015–2016	CAPS United		
2016–2018	Simba		
2018–2019	CAPS United		

International career
2004–2011	Zimbabwe	34	(2)
- * Club domestic league appearances and goals

Method Mwanjali (born 25 April 1983) is a Zimbabwean football player who played as a defender for clubs in Zimbabwe, South Africa and Tanzania.

He also played for the Zimbabwean national team.

== International career ==
=== International goals ===
Scores and results list Zimbabwe's goal tally first.

No	Date	Venue	Opponent	Score	Result	Competition
1.	9 September 2007	Barbourfields Stadium, Bulawayo, Zimbabwe	Malawi	3–1	3–1	2008 Africa Cup of Nations qualification
2.	17 October 2009	Rufaro Stadium, Harare, Zimbabwe	Zambia	3–1	3–1	2009 COSAFA Cup
