= Phinda Dlamini =

Eswatini international footballer

Personal information
- Date of birth: 26 August 1991 (age 35)
- Place of birth: Manzini, Swaziland
- Height: 1.82 m (6 ft 0 in)
- Position: Striker

Senior career*
Years	Team	Apps	(Gls)
2008–2011	Green Mamba	62	(38)

International career^{‡}
2008–2019	Swaziland	27	(3)
- * Club domestic league appearances and goals ‡ National team caps and goals as of 19 October 2019

Phinda Dlamini (born 26 August 1991) is a Liswati international footballer who plays as a striker. As of February 2010, he plays for Green Mamba in the Swazi Premier League and has won 10 caps and scored one goal for his country.

== International career ==
=== International goals ===
Scores and results list Eswatini's goal tally first.

No.	Date	Venue	Opponent	Score	Result	Competition
1.	19 July 2008	Witbank Stadium, Witbank, South Africa	Madagascar	1–0	1–1	2008 COSAFA Cup
2.	16 November 2014	Somhlolo National Stadium, Lobamba, Eswatini	Tanzania	1–0	1–1	Friendly
3.	19 October 2019	National Heroes Stadium, Lusaka, Zambia	Zambia	1–2	2–2	2020 African Nations Championship qualification
