= Johan Marmitte =

Mauritian footballer

Personal information
- Full name: Johan Marmitte
- Date of birth: January 31, 1977 (age 49)
- Place of birth: Mauritius
- Position: Midfielder

Team information
- Current team: Curepipe Starlight SC

Senior career*
Years	Team	Apps	(Gls)
2001–2002	US Beau Bassin/Rose Hill	-	(-)
2002–	Curepipe Starlight SC	-	(-)

International career
2003–	Mauritius	15	(1)
- * Club domestic league appearances and goals

Johan Marmitte is a Mauritian football player, who currently plays for Curepipe Starlight SC in the Mauritian Premier League and for the Mauritius National football team as a midfielder. He was born in Mauritius on January 31, 1977. He was with US Beau Bassin/Rose Hill team from 2001 to 2002. He is featured on the Mauritian national team in the official 2010 FIFA World Cup video game.
