= Halidou Malam =

Cameroonian footballer

Personal information
- Full name: Halidou Malam Ibrahim
- Date of birth: 8 July 1976 (age 50)
- Place of birth: Cameroon
- Position: Striker

Senior career*
Years	Team	Apps	(Gls)
- Bandung Raya
1999–2000	Kaizer Chiefs		

International career
- Cameroon U20
- * Club domestic league appearances and goals

Halidou Malam Ibrahim (born 8 July 1976) is a former Cameroonian professional footballer who is last known to have been a member of South Africa's Kaizer Chiefs in the 1999–00 season.

== Club career ==
Replacing Pollen Ndlanya at Kaizer Chiefs in the 1999-00 season, Malam was said to have looked somnolent on the field, failing to score in any of his six five starts and one substitute appearance there, despite starting his first outing confronting Tembisa Classic.
