= Djamel Bakar =

Comorian professional footballer (born 1989)

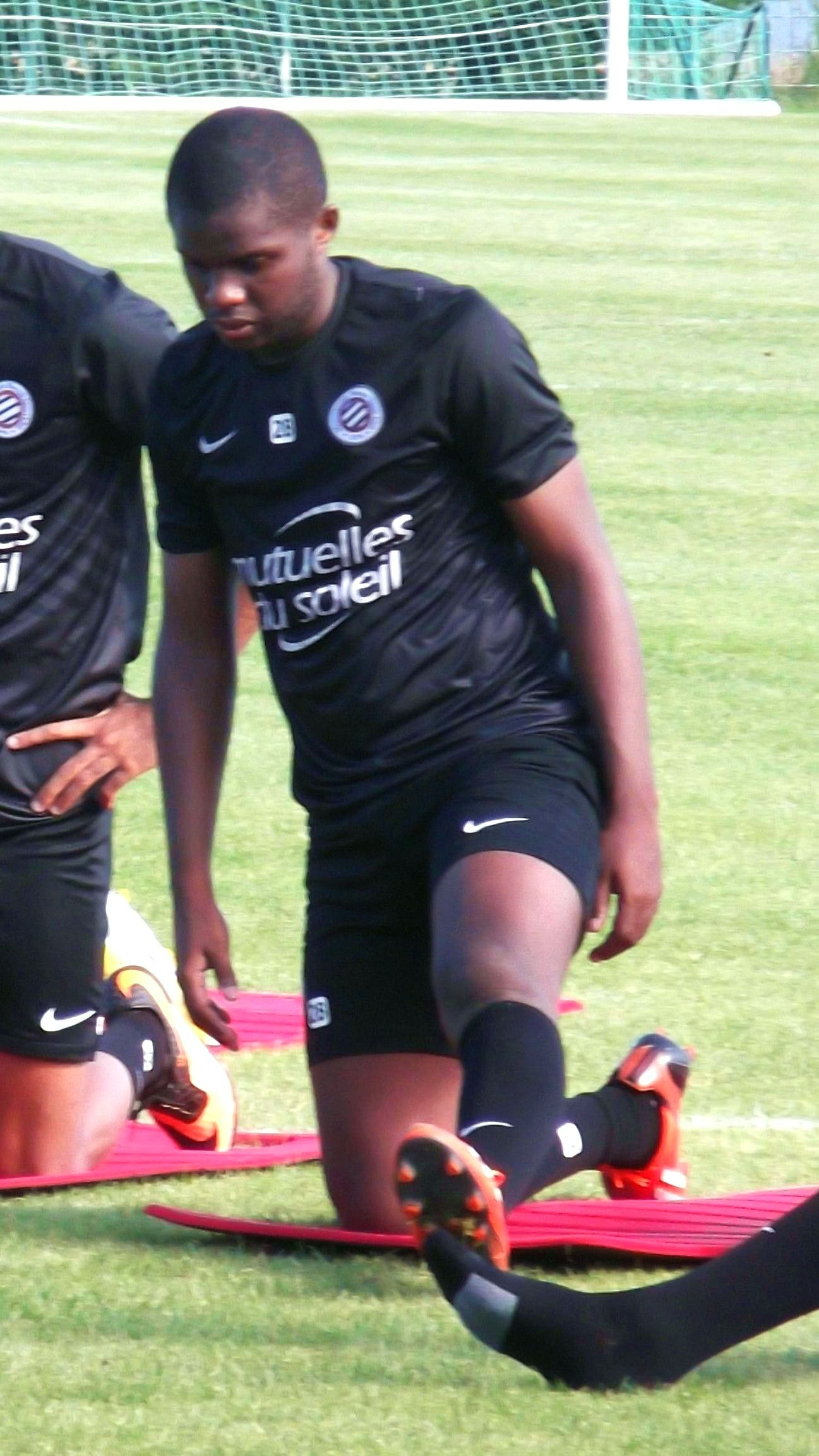

Personal information
- Date of birth: 6 April 1989 (age 37)
- Place of birth: Marseille, France
- Height: 1.71 m (5 ft 7 in)
- Position: Striker

Youth career
- 1997–1998: JSA Saint-Antoine
- 1998–2001: JS Des Pennes Mirabeau
- 2001–2004: Burel FC
- 2004–2007: Monaco

Senior career*
Years	Team	Apps	(Gls)
2007–2009	Monaco	29	(1)
2009–2013	Nancy	121	(12)
2010–2012	Nancy II	7	(0)
2013–	Montpellier	33	(2)
2014–2016	Montpellier II	16	(7)
2016–2017	Charleroi	15	(2)
2017–2018	Tours	7	(0)
2017–2018	Tours II	12	(3)
2019	F91 Dudelange	0	(0)

International career^{‡}
2007–2008	France U19	5	(1)
2009–2010	France U21	8	(2)
2016–	Comoros	13	(2)
- * Club domestic league appearances and goals as of 00:06, 5 August 2018 (UTC) ‡ National team caps and goals as of 26 April 2018

Djamel Bakar (born 6 April 1989) is a Comorian professional footballer who most recently played for the F91 Dudelange and Comoros national football team as a striker.

== Club career ==
On 6 January 2008, Bakar scored three goals for AS Monaco FC against Stade Brestois 29 in the Coupe de France. A very impressive performance for a player of only 18 years, he was commended for this by the French press, and match commentators. On 31 August 2009, Bakar signed for AS Nancy.

On 31 January 2019, Bakar joined Luxembourg National Division club F91 Dudelange. He left the club at the end of the season.

== International career ==
Bakar was born in France to parents of Comorian descent. He represented France at the 2009 Mediterranean Games. In March 2016, he was called up to the Comoros national football team and made his debut in a historic 1–0 win against Botswana.

=== International goals ===
Scores and results list Comoros' goal tally first.

No	Date	Venue	Opponent	Score	Result	Competition
1.	15 November 2016	Stade El Menzah, Tunis, Tunisia	Gabon	1–0	1–1	Friendly
2.	24 March 2018	Stade de Marrakech, Marrakesh, Morocco	Kenya	2–1	2–2	Friendly

== Personal life ==
His brother Ibor represents Comoros at senior level.
