= Tovohery Rabenandrasana =

Malagasy footballer

Tovo Rabenandrasana
Personal information
- Full name: Tovohery Rabenandrasana
- Date of birth: November 12, 1987 (age 38)
- Place of birth: Madagascar
- Position: Left-back

Team information
- Current team: Academie Ny Antsika

Senior career*
Years	Team	Apps	(Gls)
2006	Academie Ny Antsika		
2007	AA Antsirabe (loan)		
2008–	Academie Ny Antsika		

International career
2007–2011	Madagascar	10	(2)
- * Club domestic league appearances and goals

Tovohery Rabenandrasana (born 12 November 1987) is a Malagasy footballer currently plays for Academie Ny Antsika, he played formerly on loan for AA Antsirabe.
