= Henry Banda =

Zambian footballer (born 1990)

Personal information
- Date of birth: 16 September 1990 (age 36)
- Place of birth: Lusaka, Zambia
- Height: 1.73 m (5 ft 8 in)
- Position: Midfielder

Senior career*
Years	Team	Apps	(Gls)
2007	Kabwe Warriors		
2008–2010	Zanaco		
2008	→ Red Arrows (loan)		
2010–2012	Green Buffaloes		
2013–2015	Zanaco		
2016	NAPSA Stars		

International career
2008–2009	Zambia	12	(1)
- * Club domestic league appearances and goals

Henry Banda (born 16 September 1990) is a retired Zambian football midfielder.
