= Joey Antipas =

Zimbabwean football coach

Managerial career
- Years: Team
- 2010: Motor Action
- 2015: Chicken Inn
- 2016–2017: AmaZulu
- 2019–2020: Zimbabwe (caretaker manager)
- 2020–2023: Chicken Inn

Joey Antipas is a Zimbabwean football coach.

== Career ==
Antipas won the Zimbabwean domestic league with Motor Action in 2010 and Chicken Inn in 2015. In May 2016, he became the manager of South African club AmaZulu, but was sacked in August 2017. He then became the caretaker manager of the Zimbabwe national team in August 2019. On 30 January 2020, Antipas was named as assistant to newly-appointed Zimbabwean national team manager Zdravko Logarusic.

Antipas returned to Chicken Inn on 16 January 2020. He was demoted in January 2023.
