= Anhanguera-Uniderp University =

Brazilian university

Universidade Anhanguera-Uniderp
- Former name: CESUP
- Type: Private
- President: Guilherme Marback Neto
- Location: Campo Grande, Mato Grosso do Sul, Brazil; 20.4656°S 54.5917°W
- Website: uniderp.br

Anhanguera-Uniderp University is a private university in Campo Grande, Mato Grosso do Sul, Brazil that was established in 1974 and is controlled by the private educational group Anhanguera.
