= Ibor Bakar =

Comorian footballer (born 1986)

Personal information
- Date of birth: October 26, 1986 (age 40)
- Place of birth: Marseille, France
- Height: 1.70 m (5 ft 7 in)
- Position: Midfielder

Team information
- Current team: US Marignane

Senior career*
Years	Team	Apps	(Gls)
2000–2006	Toulouse B	7	(0)
2006–2009	GS Consolat		
2009–2011	US Marignane	35	(2)
2011–2013	Gardanne		
2013–	US 1er Canton Marseille 1953		

International career
2007	Comoros	1	(1)
- * Club domestic league appearances and goals as of 13:47, 7 August 2018 (UTC)

Ibor Bakar (born 26 October 1986) is a footballer who plays as a midfielder for French fourth division side US Marignane. Born in France, he represented Comoros at international level.

== International career ==
He has competed with the Comoros national football team, including scoring a goal in a 6–2 loss to Madagascar in October 2007. The match was the first leg of a preliminary round knockout tie, the winner progressing to the CAF group stages for 2010 World Cup qualification.

== Personal life ==
His brother Djamel plays for Ligue 1 club Montpellier.
