= Lennox Bacela =

South African soccer player (born 1983)

Personal information
- Full name: Luyanda Lennox Bacela
- Date of birth: 13 April 1983 (age 43)
- Place of birth: George, South Africa
- Height: 1.80 m (5 ft 11 in)
- Position: Striker

Youth career
- Eden Young Blues
- Engen Santos

Senior career*
Years	Team	Apps	(Gls)
2008–2010	Engen Santos	12	(0)
2010–2011	→ Bloemfontein Celtic (loan)	19	(6)
2011–2013	Bloemfontein Celtic	56	(13)
2013–2015	Orlando Pirates	31	(4)
2015–2016	University of Pretoria	26	(3)

International career
2013	South Africa	1	(0)
- * Club domestic league appearances and goals

Lennox Bacela (born 13 April 1983) is a South African soccer player who played as a striker. in the Premier Soccer League.

== Early life ==
Lennox was born in Knysna in 1983 and grew up in a very liberal and open-minded family. School years were spent at York High in George and, after matriculating, Lennox spent a year interning at First National Bank which later led to his financial clerk position at George Municipality. Another year in finance made him realize he wanted to follow a more active path in life, so he further explored his sporting talents and enlisted in the Vodacom League Games (second division).

== Professional career ==
Lennox's first soccer big break was playing for Cape Town-based Santos FC for the season 2008-2010 and since then he progressed through the ranks and has been signed to Bloemfontein Celtic (2010-2013) where he was among the top scorers. Since then he and has found homage at Orlando Pirates FC (2013 -2015) and is now at University of Pretoria F.C. Lennox made his international debut in 2013 during an international friendly for Bafana Bafana against Swaziland
