= Jeremy Overbeek-Bloem =

Dutch football player (b. 1980)

Jeremy Overbeek Bloem
Personal information
- Date of birth: 26 August 1980 (age 45)
- Place of birth: Netherlands
- Position: Midfielder

Senior career*
Years	Team	Apps	(Gls)
199x-2000	SBV Vitesse	0	(0)
2000-2001	De Graafschap	1	(0)
2001-2003	Ajax Cape Town F.C.		
2003-2004	Door Ons Vrienden Opgericht		
2004-2005	VV Bennekom		
2005-2006	De Treffers		
2006-2008	AFC Ajax (amateur)		
2008-2009	JOS Watergraafsmeer		
2009-2012	VUC		
2012-2016	VV DUNO		
- * Club domestic league appearances and goals

Jeremy Overbeek Bloem (born 26 August 1980 in the Netherlands) is a Dutch footballer who now works as Head of scouting SIA at Soccer Insight Agency in his home country.

== Career ==
Overbeek Bloem started his senior career with SBV Vitesse. In 2000, he signed for De Graafschap in the Dutch Eredivisie, where he made one league appearance and scored zero goals. After that, he played for South African club Ajax Cape Town and Dutch clubs Door Ons Vrienden Opgericht, VV Bennekom, De Treffers, AFC Ajax (amateur), JOS Watergraafsmeer, VUC, VV DUNO and still playing for Ajax Amsterdam (amateurs).
