= Grigori Grishin =

Russian footballer

Personal information
- Full name: Grigori Dmitriyevich Grishin
- Date of birth: 10 September 1997 (age 29)
- Place of birth: Vladimir, Russia
- Height: 1.87 m (6 ft 2 in)
- Positions: Midfielder; defender

Youth career
- FC Dynamo Moscow

Senior career*
Years	Team	Apps	(Gls)
2015–2016	FC Torpedo Vladimir	18	(0)
2016–2018	University of Pretoria F.C.	11	(0)
2018–2020	Jomo Cosmos F.C.	12	(0)
2020–2021	FC Tyumen	0	(0)
2021	FC Torpedo Vladimir	2	(0)
- * Club domestic league appearances and goals

Grigori Dmitriyevich Grishin (Russian: Григорий Дмитриевич Гришин; born 10 September 1997) is a Russian former football player.

== Club career ==
He made his debut in the Russian Professional Football League for FC Torpedo Vladimir on 28 July 2015 in a game against FC Khimki.
