= Joseph Makhanya =

South African soccer player

Personal information
- Full name: Joseph Mbutisi Makhanya
- Date of birth: 15 September 1981 (age 45)
- Place of birth: Soweto, South Africa
- Height: 1.64 m (5 ft 5 in)
- Position: Right winger

Youth career
- Kagiso Porto FC
- –2000: Orlando Pirates

Senior career*
Years	Team	Apps	(Gls)
2000–2011	Orlando Pirates	140	(6)
2011	→ Mpumalanga Black Aces (loan)	11	(0)
2011–2013	Moroka Swallows	30	(1)
Total		185	(7)

International career
2006	South Africa	1	(0)
- * Club domestic league appearances and goals

Joseph Makhanya (born 15 September 1981) is a South African former soccer player who played as a midfielder. He was capped once by the South Africa national team.

He hails from Dobsonville, Soweto and was known as "Duku duku". Not to be confused with Ernest Botsotso Makhanya.
