= Sonny Opara =

Nigerian footballer

Personal information
- Place of birth: Nigeria
- Position(s): Striker

Senior career*
Years	Team	Apps	(Gls)
1997–1998	Orlando Pirates		(3)
- *Club domestic league appearances and goals

Sonny Opara is a Nigerian former footballer. He was once CEO of Akwuegbu United F.C. in his native country.

== Orlando Pirates ==
Known for wearing a sweatband embossed with the word 'CHIKA', Opara made 18 league starts and scored 5 goals in all competitions during his first season there, leaving the club after Shuaibu Amodu was replaced by Viktor Bondarenko.
