= Samuel Darpoh =

Ghanaian footballer

Personal information
- Full name: Samuel Mensah Darpoh
- Date of birth: 15 March 1998 (age 28)
- Position: Midfielder

Team information
- Current team: Venda

Youth career
- Okwawu United
- –2016: AmaZulu

Senior career*
Years	Team	Apps	(Gls)
2016–2021	AmaZulu	72	(0)
2022	Summerfield		
2022–	Venda	7	(0)
- * Club domestic league appearances and goals as of 23 October 2022

Samuel Darpoh (born 15 March 1998) is a Ghanaian professional footballer who plays as a midfielder for South African side Venda. He played youth football with Okwawu United, before joining AmaZulu as a young player. He made his debut for the club on 28 August 2016 in a 2–1 victory at home to Black Leopards. He is the cousin of fellow Ghanaian footballer John Arwuah.
