= Mokone Marabe =

Mosotho footballer (born 1990)

Personal information
- Full name: Mokone Marabe
- Date of birth: 12 November 1990 (age 35)
- Place of birth: Lesotho
- Position: Striker

Team information
- Current team: Bantu FC
- Number: 9

Senior career*
Years	Team	Apps	(Gls)
2008–2011	FC Likhopo		
2011–	Bantu FC		

International career^{‡}
2009	Lesotho	3	(0)
- * Club domestic league appearances and goals ‡ National team caps and goals as of 17:13, 22 February 2018 (UTC)

Mokone Marabe is a Mosotho footballer who plays as a striker for Bantu FC. Since 2008, he has won four caps for the Lesotho national football team.

== Career ==
Mokone Marabe began his senior football career with Bantu FC in the Lesotho Premier League, where he established himself as a pacey, direct striker. He has played alongside his brother, Litšepe Marabe, at both club and international level.

== International career ==
Marabe made his debut for the Lesotho national football team (Likuena) in 2008 and has earned multiple caps at senior level. He previously represented Lesotho at under-20 and under-23 level. In 2020, he was named in the Likuena squad for the African Nations Championship (CHAN) qualification matches against Zimbabwe.

== Personal life ==
Marabe comes from a footballing family. His father is a former footballer who remained closely involved in both Mokone and Litšepe's careers. The brothers have described their father as a key source of encouragement, emphasizing hard work, humility, and discipline.
