= Momed Hagi =

Mozambican footballer

Hagi
Personal information
- Full name: Momed Antônio Hagi
- Date of birth: 29 May 1985 (age 41)
- Place of birth: Maputo, Mozambique
- Height: 1.76 m (5 ft 9 in)
- Position: Centre back
2009–2016	Ferroviário Maputo		

International career^{‡}
Years	Team	Apps	(Gls)
2005–2015	Mozambique	62	(3)
- ‡ National team caps and goals as of 11 June 2020

Momed Antônio Hagi (born 29 May 1985), known simply as Hagi, is a Mozambican footballer who plays as a defender for Liga Desportiva de Maputo. He earned 62 caps with the Mozambique national team between 2005 and 2015.
