= Koutche Kabirou =

Beninese footballer (born 1993)

Personal information
- Date of birth: 6 May 1993 (age 33)
- Place of birth: Benin
- Positions: Left winger; left midfielder

Team information
- Current team: Williamsville AC

Senior career*
Years	Team	Apps	(Gls)
- CIFAS de Djeffa
2011–2012	UAC		
2012–2014	Mogas 90 FC		
2014–20??	FC Pyunik		
2016–2017	Witbank Spurs	17	(1)
2018	ASN Nigelec		
2019–	Williamsville AC		
- * Club domestic league appearances and goals

Koutche Kabirou (born 6 May 1993) is a Beninese footballer who plays for Williamsville AC of the MTN Ligue 1. A two-footed, midfielder and winger on the left flank, he is most known for his speed with the ball.

== Career ==
=== Benin ===
Beginning his career with CIFAS de Djeffa, Kabirou signed with Benin second-division side UAC in 2011–12, deployed as left-back at the behest of his coach Fortuné Glele. Adapting to the defensive position, he was snapped up by Benin top-flight contender Mogas 90 at the end of the season, he made a perceptible change in his position, switching to attack and leading his club to the Benin Cup trophy.

Representing the Atlantique and Littoral departments of Benin in the 2016 Benin Independence Cup, Kabirou converted the winning penalty for his team, winning the trophy.

=== Armenia ===
Attracted by Kabirou's performances in Benin, Armenian club Pyunik Yerevan sought to buy the winger, giving him a one-year contract and the number 18 in summer 2014. In spite of being registered to play, the Beninese player never had any game time and left the team early on account of not being consonant with the management throughout his time there.

=== South Africa ===
Testing with South African lower-league side Witbank Spurs in September 2016, Kabirou became contracted to them shortly after, at first having trouble adapting to the weather and the leagues style of play. Fortunately, despite a difficult debut, the midfielder-cum-winger scored his first goal in a 2–1 victory over Ubuntu Cape Town in his second outing, finishing the season with no injuries accompanied by making 19 appearances (starting 18) and seven assists along with earning the managements approval.

His main ambition is to represent Benin internationally and to play in South Africa's Premier Soccer League.

South African National First Division team Royal Eagles have also shown interest in the Beninese footballer.

=== Niger and Ivory Coast ===
In May 2018, Kabirou joined ASN Nigelec in Niger.

After a trial at Williamsville AC where he scored three goals in friendly games, Kabirou joined the club officially at the end of January 2019.
