= Malungisa Dlamini =

Liswati international footballer

Personal information
- Full name: Malungisa Dlamini
- Date of birth: 3 April 1978 (age 48)
- Place of birth: Swaziland
- Position: Midfielder

Senior career*
Years	Team	Apps	(Gls)
2005–	Young Buffaloes		

International career
2006–	Swaziland	10	(1)
- * Club domestic league appearances and goals

Malungisa Dlamini (born 3 April 1978) is a Liswati international footballer. He has won 10 caps and scored one goal for his country.
