= Rija Rakotomandimby =

Malagasy footballer

Personal information
- Full name: Rija Juvence Rakotomandimby
- Date of birth: November 21, 1982 (age 43)
- Place of birth: Madagascar
- Position: Midfielder

Team information
- Current team: Fanilo Japan Actuels

Senior career*
Years	Team	Apps	(Gls)
1999–2000	FC BFV		
2001–2006	Stade Olympique de l'Emyrne		
2007	USCA Foot		
2008–	Fanilo Japan Actuels		

International career
1999–2008	Madagascar		
- * Club domestic league appearances and goals

Rija Rakotomandimby (born 21 November 1982) is a Malagasy footballer with Fanilo Japan Actuels in his home country. He is also a member of the Madagascar national football team.
