= Michelle Katsvairo =

Zimbabwean footballer (born 1990)

Personal information
- Date of birth: May 5, 1990 (age 36)
- Place of birth: Mutoko, Zimbabwe
- Height: 1.73 m (5 ft 8 in)
- Position: Forward

Team information
- Current team: Township Rollers

Senior career*
Years	Team	Apps	(Gls)
2009–2010	Black Mambas		
2011	Gunners		
2012–2014	Platinum		
2015–2016	Chicken Inn		
2016–2018	Kaizer Chiefs	12	(1)
2017–2018	→ Singida United (loan)		
2018	CAPS United	1	(0)
2019	Free State Stars	3	(0)
2019–2020	Ngezi Platinum		
2020	Highlanders		
2020–	Township Rollers		

International career
2017–	Zimbabwe	5	(0)
- * Club domestic league appearances and goals

Michelle Katsvairo is a Zimbabwean footballer who currently plays for Township Rollers.

Having been a product of Zimbabwe's renowned Black Ace's Academy, he has already scored on two occasions in all competitions for the Amakhosi.

== Club career ==
Back in Chicken Inn FC, he managed a total of 14 goals in 2015–16. Joining from Chicken Inn F.C. in the summer, Katsvairo enhanced Kaizer Chiefs FC's striking options. He made his league debut for the club on 14 September 2016 in a 1–1 home draw with Platinum Stars F.C. He was subbed on for Lucky Baloyi in the 67th minute. He scored his first goal against Free State Stars to secure a 2–0 win. His goal came in the 63rd minute.
