= Jean Tsaralaza =

Malagasy footballer

Personal information
- Full name: Jean de l'Or Carolus Tsaralaza
- Date of birth: December 24, 1985 (age 40)
- Place of birth: Analamanga, Madagascar
- Position: Midfielder

Team information
- Current team: St. Louis Suns United
- Number: 17

Youth career
- 2000–2004: AS Adema

Senior career*
Years	Team	Apps	(Gls)
2005–2008	AS Adema	73	(12)
2009–	St. Louis Suns United	15	(0)

International career
2005–	Madagascar	25	(1)
- * Club domestic league appearances and goals

Jean de l'Or Carolus Tsaralaza (born 24 February 1985 in Analamanga) is a Malagasy footballer, who is currently playing for St. Louis Suns United.

== Club career ==
Tsaralaza began his career with AS Adema in the THB Champions League and joined in January 2009 to St. Louis Suns United.

== International career ==
A member of the national squad, Tsaralaza is a midfielder and one of the main players of the team.
