= Powerlines F.C. =

- Full name: Powerlines Football Club
- Founded: 1968; 58 years ago
- League: Dikgatlong Local Football League

Powerlines F.C. is a South African soccer club based in Windsorton, Northern Cape. Founded in 1968, they competed in the South African lower leagues for all of their history. As of 2021, they competed in the Dikgatlong Local Football League.

During the 2011–12 season, they managed to qualify for the Nedbank Cup after beating Kakamas Cosmos 4–3. In the round of 32, they were beaten 24–0 in by Mamelodi Sundowns, a record result.
