= Ndoda Mthethwa =

Swazi footballer

Personal information
- Full name: Ndoda Mthethwa
- Date of birth: 9 September 1987 (age 39)
- Place of birth: Swaziland
- Position: Striker

Senior career*
Years	Team	Apps	(Gls)
2006–	Manzini Wanderers		

International career
2009–	Swaziland	4	(1)
- * Club domestic league appearances and goals

Ndoda Mthethwa (born 9 September 1987) is a Swaziland international footballer who plays as a striker. As of February 2010, he plays for Manzini Wanderers and has won four caps and scored one goal for his country.
