= Fábio Costa (footballer, born May 1977) =

Brazilian footballer

Personal information
- Full name: Fábio Bittencourt da Costa
- Date of birth: 16 May 1977 (age 49)
- Place of birth: Duque de Caxias-RJ, Brazil
- Height: 1.82 m (5 ft 11 1/2 in)
- Position: Midfielder

Senior career*
Years	Team	Apps	(Gls)
1998–1999	Fluminense		
2000	Bangu		
- Madureira
2003	Chernomorets Novorossiysk	13	(0)
2005	Madureira		
2006	Guanabara		
2006–2007	Mamelodi Sundowns		
2008	Mesquita		
2009	CFZ do Rio		
- * Club domestic league appearances and goals

Fábio Bittencourt da Costa (born 16 May 1977), best known simply as Fábio Costa, is a Brazilian former football midfielder.

== Career ==
Fábio Costa spent a 2003 season in the Russian Premier League playing for lowly-rated FC Chernomorets Novorossiysk that had relegated after finishing last. He is currently contracted to Centro de Futebol Zico Sociedade Esportiva.
