= Stade de Beaumer =

Multi-use stadium in Moroni, Comoros

Coordinates: 11°42′30″S 43°14′53″E

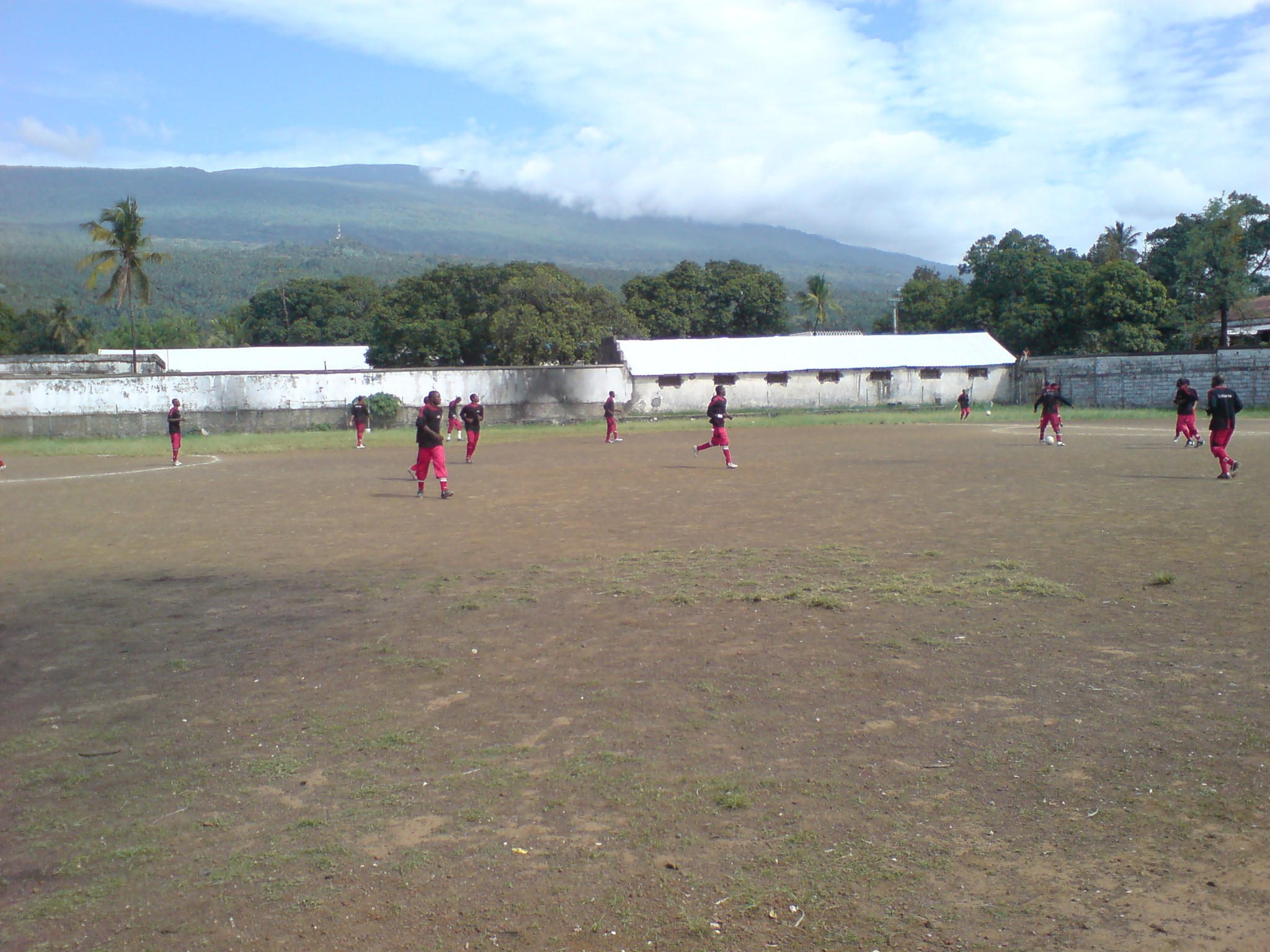
- Interactive map of Stade de Beaumer
- Full name: Stade de Beaumer
- Location: Moroni, Comoros
- Capacity: 3,000
- Surface: Grass

Construction
- Built: 1985

Tenants
- Volcan Club; US de Zilimadjou; Comoros national football team Comoros national under-17 football team

Stade de Beaumer, also known as Stade de Moroni, is a multi-use stadium in Moroni, the capital city of the Comoros. It is used primarily for football matches.

== History ==
The stadium was built in 1985. A new venue, Stade Said Mohamed Cheikh, was built and opened in 2007 as the Stade de Beaumer was considered insufficient, following Comoros's membership in FIFA.
