= Stade Said Mohamed Cheikh =

Coordinates: 11°23′32″S 43°17′19″E

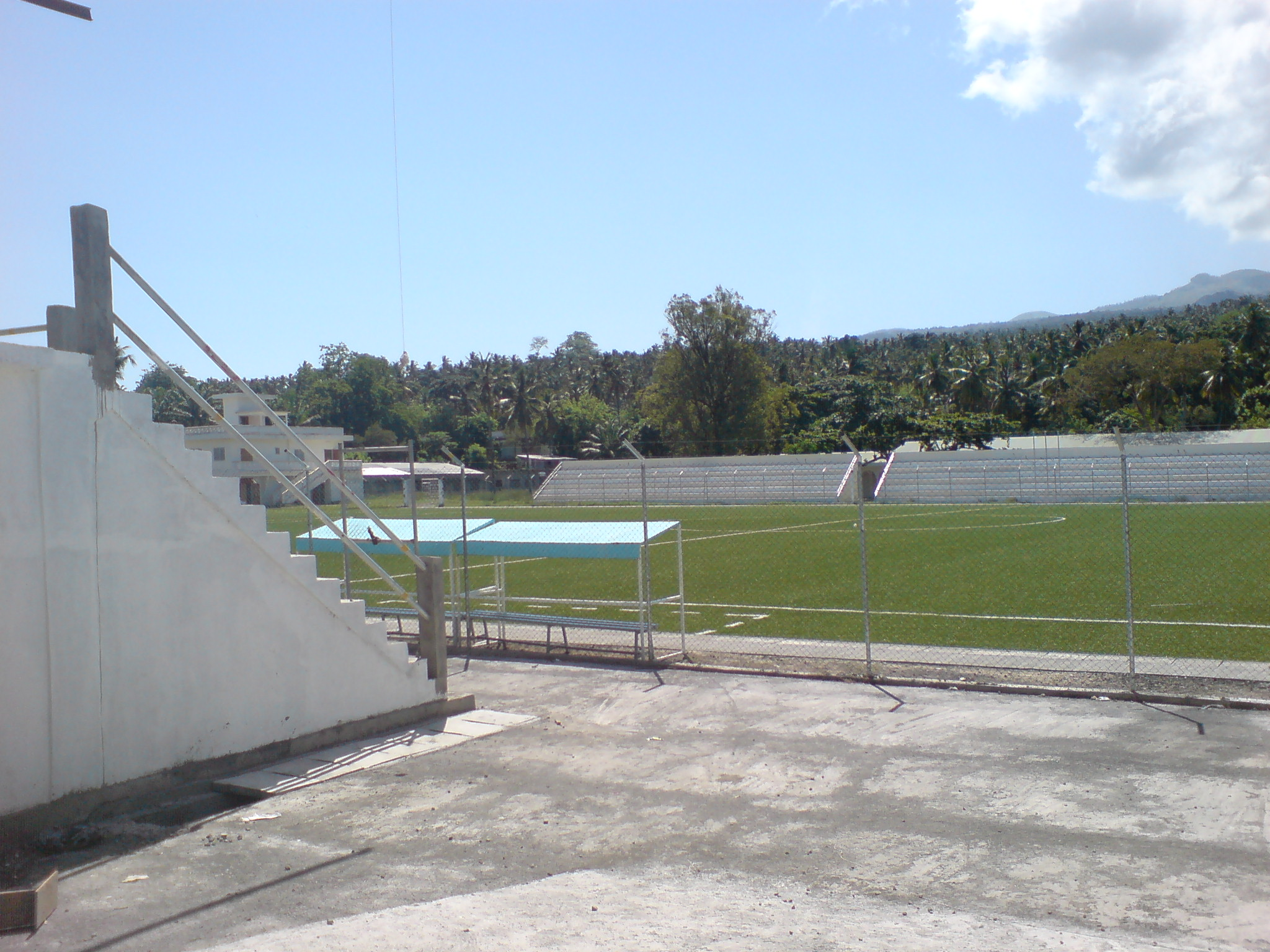
- Interactive map of Stade Said Mohamed Cheikh
- Full name: Stade Said Mohamed Cheikh
- Location: Mitsamiouli, Comoros
- Capacity: 2,000

Construction
- Groundbreaking: 2005
- Opened: 2007

Tenant
- Comoros national football team (2007–2019)

Stade Said Mohamed Cheikh is a multi-use stadium in Mitsamiouli, Comoros. It is currently used mostly for staging football matches.

== History ==
It was opened in 2007 as part of FIFA's Win in Africa with Africa program. It is named after former Comoros head, Said Mohamed Cheikh. It replaced Stade de Beaumer as the home of the Comoros national football team. It was the first stadium in the Comoros to host a CAF Champions League match.
