= Jamuovandu Ngatjizeko =

Namibian footballer

Jamu Ngatjizeko
Personal information
- Full name: Jamuovandu Ngatjizeko
- Date of birth: December 28, 1984 (age 41)
- Place of birth: Omaruru, South West Africa
- Height: 1.83 m (6 ft 0 in)
- Position: Midfielder

Team information
- Current team: African Stars

Youth career
- 2001–2002: Hotflames Windhoek
- 2002–2003: Liverpool Okahandja

Senior career*
Years	Team	Apps	(Gls)
2003–2007	FC Civics	25	(?)
2007–2008	African Stars	6	(0)
2009	Jomo Cosmos		
2009–	African Stars		

International career^{‡}
2002–2003	Namibia U-21	8	(?)
2004	Namibia U-23	12	(?)
2006–	Namibia	37	(1)
- * Club domestic league appearances and goals as of February 28, 2007 ‡ National team caps and goals as of March 28, 2013

Jamuovandu Ngatjizeko (born December 28, 1984, in Omaruru) is a Namibian football midfielder currently playing for African Stars.

== Career ==
African Stars will put to test their latest arrival in Jamu Ngatjizeko who deserted Civics earlier this season.

== International ==
He is a member of the Namibia national football team.
