= Moli Lesesa =

Mosotho footballer (born 1984)

Personal information
- Full name: Molidavi Lesesa
- Date of birth: 1 April 1984 (age 42)
- Place of birth: Lesotho
- Position: Central midfielder

Team information
- Current team: Joy FC

Senior career*
Years	Team	Apps	(Gls)
2006–	Joy FC		

International career^{‡}
2008–	Lesotho	13	(1)
- * Club domestic league appearances and goals ‡ National team caps and goals as of 08:55, 22 December 2009 (UTC)

Moli Lesesa (born 1 April 1984) is a Mosotho footballer who currently plays as a midfielder for Joy FC. Since 2008, he has won 13 caps and scored one goal for the Lesotho national football team.
