= Fisher Kondowe =

Malawian footballer

Personal information
- Full name: Fisher Kenani Kondowe
- Date of birth: November 6, 1976 (age 49)
- Place of birth: Blantyre, Malawi
- Height: 1.70 m (5 ft 7 in)
- Position: Attacking midfielder

Team information
- Current team: Big Bullets

Senior career*
Years	Team	Apps	(Gls)
2002–2005	Bakili Bullets	?	(?)
2005–2006	Bush Bucks	27	(1)
2006–2011	Black Leopards	50	(8)
2008	→ Bloemfontein Celtic (loan)	9	(0)
2011–	Big Bullets		

International career^{‡}
2002–	Malawi	50	(2)
- * Club domestic league appearances and goals as of June 5, 2013 ‡ National team caps and goals as of June 5, 2013

Fisher Kondowe (born November 6, 1976) is a Malawian football (soccer) player who currently plays for Big Bullets. His position is midfielder. In 2020, he retired from football
