= Hubert Robson =

Malagasy footballer

Personal information
- Full name: Hubert Robson Razakananantena
- Date of birth: January 17, 1974 (age 52)
- Place of birth: Madagascar
- Position: Midfielder

Team information
- Current team: Fanilo Japan Actuels

Senior career*
Years	Team	Apps	(Gls)
2007–	Fanilo Japan Actuels		

International career
1996–2008	Madagascar	19	(2)
- * Club domestic league appearances and goals

Hubert Robson Razakananantena (born January 17, 1974) is a Malagasy footballer currently plays for Fanilo Japan Actuels.
