= 2010 CECAFA Cup =

2010 CECAFA Senior Challenge Cup
- 2010 CECAFA Senior Challenge Cup Logo

Tournament details
- Host country: Tanzania
- Dates: November 27 – December 12
- Teams: 12 (9 CECAFA members + 3 invitees)
- Venues: 2 (in 1 host city)

Final positions
- Champions: Tanzania (3rd title)
- Runners-up: Ivory Coast
- Third place: Uganda
- Fourth place: Ethiopia

Tournament statistics
- Matches played: 26
- Goals scored: 58 (2.23 per match)
- Top scorer: (Zambia) Felix Sunzu (5 goals)

The 2010 CECAFA Senior Challenge Cup (known as the CECAFA Tusker Cup for sponsorship reasons) is the 34th edition of the competition. The host of the tournament is Tanzania.

== Participants ==
- Burundi
- Ivory Coast (invitee)
- Ethiopia
- Kenya
- Malawi (invitee)
- Rwanda
- Somalia
- Sudan
- Tanzania (hosts)
- Uganda (holders)
- Zambia (invitee)
- Zanzibar

== Information ==
Eritrea and Djibouti were left out due to missing the deadline for the draw.

The winner team will receive $30,000 USD, the runner up will receive $20,000 USD and third place will receive $10,000 USD. There will also be prizes for the best team, best goalkeeper and top scorer among others.

In the event that one of the invited teams wins the tournament, a replica trophy will be handed over and the prize money.

East African Breweries Limited (EABL) agreed to sponsor the tournament. They paid $450,000 USD.

All the games will be played in Dar es Salaam to allow easy TV coverage by Super Sport.

== Group stage ==
=== Group A ===
Team	Pld	W	D	L	GF	GA	GD	Pts
Zambia	3	2	1	0	7	0	+7	7
Tanzania	3	2	0	1	5	1	+4	6
Burundi	3	1	1	1	2	2	0	4
Somalia	3	0	0	3	0	11	−11	0

27 November 2010
14:00 UTC+03:00

Burundi	2–0	Somalia
Nahimana 18'; Habarugira 72'

Benjamin Mkapa National Stadium, Dar es Salaam
27 November 2010
16:00 UTC+03:00

Tanzania	0–1	Zambia
		Mudenda 24'

Benjamin Mkapa National Stadium, Dar es Salaam
Referee: Denis Batte (UGA)

30 November 2010
14:00 UTC+03:00

Zambia	0–0	Burundi

Benjamin Mkapa National Stadium, Dar es Salaam
30 November 2010
16:00 UTC+03:00

Tanzania	3–0	Somalia
Shindika 41' (pen.); Bocco 76'; Bakari 89'

Benjamin Mkapa National Stadium, Dar es Salaam

3 December 2010
14:00 UTC+03:00

Somalia	0–6	Zambia
		Sunzu 25', 27', 43', 49' (pen.); Mukuka 28'; Mapande 81'

Benjamin Mkapa National Stadium, Dar es Salaam
4 December 2010
16:00 UTC+03:00

Tanzania	2–0	Burundi
Bakari 12', 77'

Benjamin Mkapa National Stadium, Dar es Salaam

=== Group B ===
Team	Pld	W	D	L	GF	GA	GD	Pts
Ivory Coast	3	2	0	1	5	2	+3	6
Rwanda	3	1	2	0	2	1	+1	5
Zanzibar	3	1	1	1	2	1	+1	4
Sudan	3	0	1	2	0	5	−5	1

28 November 2010
14:00 UTC+03:00

Sudan	0–2	Zanzibar
		Salum 11', 66'

Benjamin Mkapa National Stadium, Dar es Salaam
28 November 2010
16:00 UTC+03:00

Rwanda	2–1	Ivory Coast
Birori 44'; Kagabo 77'		Kouadio 19'

Benjamin Mkapa National Stadium, Dar es Salaam

1 December 2010
14:00 UTC+03:00

Sudan	0–0	Rwanda

Benjamin Mkapa National Stadium, Dar es Salaam
1 December 2010
16:00 UTC+03:00

Ivory Coast	1–0	Zanzibar
Bolou 62'

Benjamin Mkapa National Stadium, Dar es Salaam

3 December 2010
16:00 UTC+03:00

Zanzibar	0–0	Rwanda

Benjamin Mkapa National Stadium, Dar es Salaam
5 December 2010
14:00 UTC+03:00

Ivory Coast	3–0	Sudan
Kone 36'; Tchetche 59', 77'

Benjamin Mkapa National Stadium, Dar es Salaam

=== Group C ===
Team	Pld	W	D	L	GF	GA	GD	Pts
Uganda	3	2	1	0	5	2	+3	7
Malawi	3	1	2	0	5	4	+1	5
Ethiopia	3	1	1	1	4	4	0	4
Kenya	3	0	0	3	3	7	−4	0

29 November 2010
14:00 UTC+03:00

Ethiopia	1–2	Uganda
Bekele 24'		Masaba 35' (pen.); Kisekka 46'

Benjamin Mkapa National Stadium, Dar es Salaam
29 November 2010
16:00 UTC+03:00

Malawi	3–2	Kenya
Nyirenda 1'; Banda 26', 81'		Baraza 34'; Ajwang 45+2'

Benjamin Mkapa National Stadium, Dar es Salaam

2 December 2010
14:00 UTC+03:00

Uganda	1–1	Malawi
Okwi 80'		Nyirenda 2'

Benjamin Mkapa National Stadium, Dar es Salaam
2 December 2010
16:00 UTC+03:00

Kenya	1–2	Ethiopia
Ajwang 85'		Bekele 25', 44'

Benjamin Mkapa National Stadium, Dar es Salaam

4 December 2010
14:00 UTC+03:00

Malawi	1–1	Ethiopia
Kabichi 27'		Ukuri 70'

Benjamin Mkapa National Stadium, Dar es Salaam
5 December 2010
16:00 UTC+03:00

Uganda	2–0	Kenya
Okwi 81'; Mwesigwa 90+2' (pen.)

Benjamin Mkapa National Stadium, Dar es Salaam

=== Ranking of Third-placed Teams ===
At the end of the first stage, a comparison was made between the third-placed teams of each group. The two best third-placed teams advanced to the quarter-finals.

Pos	Grp	Team	Pld	W	D	L	GF	GA	GD	Pts
1	B	Zanzibar	3	1	1	1	2	1	+1	4
2	C	Ethiopia	3	1	1	1	4	4	0	4
3	A	Burundi	3	1	1	1	2	2	0	4

== Knockout stage ==
Quarter-finals
7 December – Dar es Salaam
Zambia	1
Ethiopia	2
7 December – Dar es Salaam
Ivory Coast	1
Malawi	0
8 December – Dar es Salaam
Uganda (pen.)	2 (5)
Zanzibar	2 (3)
8 December – Dar es Salaam
Tanzania	1
Rwanda	0

Semi-finals
10 December – Dar es Salaam
Ethiopia	0
Ivory Coast	1
10 December – Dar es Salaam
Uganda	0 (4)
Tanzania (pen.)	0 (5)

Final
12 December – Dar es Salaam
Ivory Coast	0
Tanzania	1
Third place
12 December – Dar es Salaam
Ethiopia	3
Uganda	4

=== Quarter-finals ===
7 December 2010
14:00 UTC+03:00

Zambia	1–2	Ethiopia
Sunzu 58'		Butako 17'; Ukuri 37'

Benjamin Mkapa National Stadium, Dar es Salaam
7 December 2010
16:00 UTC+03:00

Ivory Coast	1–0	Malawi
Tchetche 80'

Benjamin Mkapa National Stadium, Dar es Salaam
8 December 2010
14:00 UTC+03:00

Uganda	2–2	Zanzibar
Sserumaga 13'; Okwi 47' (pen.)		Khamis 36'; Morris 87'
Penalties
	5–3

Benjamin Mkapa National Stadium, Dar es Salaam
8 December 2010
16:00 UTC+03:00

Tanzania	1–0	Rwanda
Nsajigwa 62' (pen.)

Benjamin Mkapa National Stadium, Dar es Salaam

=== Semi-finals ===
10 December 2010
14:00 UTC+03:00

Ethiopia	0–1	Ivory Coast
		Tchetche 72'

Benjamin Mkapa National Stadium, Dar es Salaam
10 December 2010
16:00 UTC+03:00

Uganda	0–0	Tanzania
Penalties
	4–5

Benjamin Mkapa National Stadium, Dar es Salaam

=== Third place play-off ===
12 December 2010
14:00 UTC+03:00

Ethiopia	3–4	Uganda
Ukuri 2', 33'; Alebachew 67'		Kisekka 5'; Okwi 48'; Mawejje 53'; Matovu 72'

Benjamin Mkapa National Stadium, Dar es Salaam

=== Final ===
12 December 2010
16:00 UTC+03:00

Ivory Coast	0–1	Tanzania
		Nsajigwa 41' (pen.)

Benjamin Mkapa National Stadium, Dar es Salaam

2010 CECAFA Cup winners

Tanzania
Third title

== Goalscorers ==
5 goals

- (Zambia) Felix Sunzu

4 goals

- (Ivory Coast) Kipre Tchetche
- (Ethiopia) Umed Ukuri
- (Uganda) Emmanuel Okwi

3 goals

- (Ethiopia) Shimelis Bekele
- (Tanzania) Nurdin Bakari

2 goals

- (Kenya) Fred Ajwang
- (Malawi) Davi Banda
- (Malawi) Victor Nyirenda
- (Tanzania) Shadrack Nsajigwa
- (Uganda) Henry Kisekka
- (Zanzibar) Ahmed Ali Salum

1 goal

- (Burundi) Jean-Paul Habarugira
- (Burundi) Claude Nahimana
- (Ivory Coast) Kipre Bolou
- (Ivory Coast) Zoumana Kone
- (Ivory Coast) Fabrice Kouadio
- (Ethiopia) Tesfaye Alebachew
- (Ethiopia) Abebaw Butako
- (Kenya) John Baraza
- (Malawi) Henry Kabichi
- (Rwanda) Daddy Birori
- (Rwanda) Peter Kagabo
- (Tanzania) John Boko
- (Tanzania) Henry Shindika
- (Uganda) Simeon Masaba
- (Uganda) Sula Matovu
- (Uganda) Tony Mawejje
- (Uganda) Andrew Mwesigwa
- (Uganda) Mike Sserumaga
- (Zambia) Venecious Mapande
- (Zambia) Kennedy Mudenda
- (Zambia) Allan Mukuka
- (Zanzibar) Aggrey Morris
- (Zanzibar) Mcha Khamis
