= 2021–22 Coupe de France preliminary rounds, Pays de la Loire =

The 2021–22 Coupe de France preliminary rounds, Pays de la Loire was the qualifying competition to decide which teams from the leagues of the Pays de la Loire region of France took part in the main competition from the seventh round.

A total of eleven teams qualified from the Pays de la Loire preliminary rounds. In 2020–21, Voltigeurs de Châteaubriant and Olympique Saumur FC progressed furthest in the main competition, reaching the round of 16 before losing to Montpellier and Toulouse respectively.

== Draws and fixtures ==
On 7 July 2021, the league announce that 532 teams had entered from the region.

On 21 July 2021, the league published the first round draw along with further details of the structure of the competition. 482 teams entered at the first round stage, from district divisions, Régional 3 and Régional 2. The remaining nine teams from Régional 2 entered at the second round stage. 22 clubs from Régional 1 and 12 from Championnat National 3 entered at the third round stage, along with the qualifier from Saint Pierre and Miguelon. The two clubs from Championnat National 2 entered at the fourth round stage and the three clubs from Championnat National entered at the fifth round stage. The second round draw was published on 1 September 2021. The fifth round draw was published on 6 October 2021. The sixth round draw was published on 19 October 2021.

=== First round ===
These matches were played on 29 August 2021.

First round results: Pays de la Loire
Tie no	Home team (tier)	Score	Away team (tier)
1.	US Challes-Grand Lucé (10)	2–4	JS Allonnes (8)
2.	US Arnage Pontlieue (8)	1–0 (Note: Tie reversed from original draw.)	FC Saint-Georges-Pruillé (10)
3.	Aiglons Durtalois (11)	1–1 (4–3 p)	US Bazouges-Cré (8)
4.	CO Laigné-Ssint-Gervais (10)	0–2	Beaumont SA (8)
5.	AS Sargéenne (10)	1–7	Écommoy FC (8)
6.	US Roézé-Voivres (9)	1–3	US Guécélard (8)
7.	SL La Chapelle-du-Bois (12)	0–5	Sainte-Jamme Sportive (10)
8.	SC Tuffé (11)	2–4	US Conlie Domfront (9)
9.	CS Parcéen (11)	1–2	FC Ménil (10)
10.	Fillé Sports (11)	2–2 (0–2 p)	SO Maine (9)
11.	US La Chapelle-d'Aligné (11)	1–2	JS Solesmienne (8)
12.	Degré FC (11)	2–1	AS Clermont-Créans (9)
13.	GSI Saosnois Courgains (11)	1–1 (9–8 p)	ASPTT Le Mans (9)
14.	ÉS Connerré (11)	1–3	AS Saint-Jean-d'Assé (9)
15.	ES Daguenière Bohalle (11)	0–3	Olympique Sal-Tour Vézins Coron (10)
16.	US Alpes Mancelles (10)	1–3	SA Mamertins (7)
17.	FC Val du Loir (9)	0–0 (4–5 p)	AS Tiercé-Cheffes (8)
18.	Football Champagné Sport (11)	0–3	US Glonnières (8)
19.	US Tennie-Saint-Symphorien (10)	0–8	FC Saint-Saturnin-La Milesse (8)
20.	AS Saint-Pavace (10)	1–1 (4–5 p)	US Mansigné (8)
21.	FC Louplande (10)	1–6	ES Yvré-l'Évêque (8)
22.	ES Champfleur (10)	4–1	US Pays de Juhel (8)
23.	AS Cérans-Foulletourte (11)	0–3	AS Ruaudin (9)
24.	US Savigné-l'Évêque (10)	1–2	US Vibraysienne (9)
25.	US Précigné (10)	2–0	JG Coudray (9)
26.	SC Luceau (10)	0–6	ES Moncé (8)
27.	JS Parigné-l'Évêque (10)	2–3	EG Rouillon (8)
28.	Internationale du Mans (10)	4–1	US La Chapelle-Saint-Rémy (9)
29.	AS Juigné-sur-Sarthe (9)	0–2	JA Soulgé-sur-Ouette (8)
30.	Dollon Omnisports (10)	0–2	CA Loué (8)
31.	US Vion (10)	0–6	AS La Chapelle-Saint-Aubin (8)
32.	US Villaines-Malicorne (10)	1–6	Auvers Poillé Brulon FC (7)
33.	US Saint-Ouen Saint-Biez (10)	0–1	La Vigilante Mayet (9)
34.	Lombron Sports (10)	0–3	FC La Bazoge (8)
35.	ES Montfort-le-Gesnois (10)	1–1 (5–6 p)	JS Ludoise (9)
36.	AS Étival (10)	1–3	US Bouloire (9)
37.	US Saint-Mars-la-Brière (9)	0–3	US Nautique Spay (7)
38.	AS Neuville-sur-Sarthe (10)	4–2	La Patriote Bonnétable (8)
39.	CO Cormes (9)	0–3	CS Changé (7)
40.	FC Longuenée-en-Anjou (9)	4–1	ES Belligné-Chapelle-Maumusson (9)
41.	US Saint-Georges-sur-Loire (11)	1–2	FC Gétigné-Boussay (10)
42.	CAS Possosavennières (9)	2–1	Hirondelle Football (8)
43.	Réveil Saint-Géréon (10)	1–0	Saint-Georges Trémentines FC (9)
44.	Christophe-Séguinière (8)	3–2	RC Ancenis 44 (7)
45.	FC Val de Moine (10)	0–3	Landreau-Loroux OSC (8)
46.	ARC Tillières (11)	0–2	FF Mortagne-sur-Sèvre (10)
47.	US Les Epesses-Saint-Mars (10)	3–1	AS Longeron-Torfou (9)
48.	Saint-Pierre Mazières (9)	6–1	RS Ardelay (9)
49.	AS Bruffière Defontaine (9)	1–5	ES Montilliers (8)
50.	Val de Sèvre Football (10)	0–4	FC Layon (9)
51.	FC Meilleraie-Montournais-Menomblet (10)	2–1	Energie Le May-sur-Èvre (9)
52.	Club du Haut Layon (11)	0–2	ASVR Ambillou-Château (11)
53.	ASC Saint-Barthélémy-d'Anjou (11)	1–9	CS Lion d'Angers (10)
54.	ES Val Baugeois (11)	0–4	UF Allonnes-Brain-sur-Allonnes (10)
55.	FC Sud Ouest Mayennais (10)	1–1 (1–4 p)	SC Nord Atlantique (9)
56.	SC Sainte-Gemmes-d'Andigné (10)	1–0	AS Meslay-du-Maine (8)
57.	USJA Saint-Martin-Aviré-Louvaine (10)	1–5	US Forcé (8)
58.	US Combrée-Bel-Air-Noyant (10)	0–1	US Dionysienne (8)
59.	CF Châtelais-Nyoiseau-Bouillé-Grugé (10)	1–1 (5–4 p)	US Entrammes (8)
60.	US Châteauneuf-sur-Sarthe (11)	2–10	US Laval (8)
61.	US Soudan (10)	2–4	FC Château-Gontier (8)
62.	Saint-Vincent LUSTVI (10)	0–2	Athletic Laigné-Loigné (8)
63.	US Méral-Cossé (7)	1–1 (2–4 p)	Jeunes d'Erbray (8)
64.	ES Craon (8)	3–0	AL Châteaubriant (8)
65.	Sainte Christine-Bourgneuf FC (10)	2–1	Abbaretz-Saffré FC (10)
66.	AS Mésanger (10)	4–1	FC Laurentais Landemontais (9)
67.	FC Oudon-Couffé (10)	2–2 (7–6 p)	Pomjeannais JA (9)
68.	Union Saint-Leger-Saint-Germain-Champtocé Avenir (10)	4–1	FC Mouzeil-Teillé-Ligné (8)
69.	SO Candé-Challain-Loiré (10)	0–9	Nort ACF (8)
70.	FC Castelvarennais (11)	1–1 (5–3 p)	Étoile Mouzillon Foot (10)
71.	AS Sud Loire (10)	0–1	AS Le-Puy-Saint-Bonnet (9)
72.	Cholet FC 2020 (9)	0–4	Élan de Gorges Foot (7)
73.	Olympique Liré-Drain (8)	0–0 (5–4 p)	AS Vieillevigne-La Planche (7)
74.	Legé FC (10)	1–3	Andrezé-Jub-Jallais FC (9)
75.	FC Beaupréau La Chapelle (8)	1–2	Étoile de Clisson (7)
76.	SomloirYzernay CPF (9)	1–1 (3–4 p)	Saint-André-Saint-Macaire FC (8)
77.	ES La Romagne-Roussay (10)	0–1	US Varades (8)
78.	FC Fuilet-Chaussaire (10)	1–1 (6–7 p)	ES Vallet (9)
79.	FC Falleron-Froidfond (10)	0–0 (2–3 p)	FC Retz (8)
80.	FC Logne et Boulogne (10)	0–3	Écureils des Pays de Monts (8)
81.	FC Bouaine Rocheservière (9)	1–1 (4–3 p)	Pornic Foot (7)
82.	Nantes Sud 98 (10)	1–4	US Bequots-Lucquois (8)
83.	Herbadilla Foot (11)	1–3	FC Garnachois (9)
84.	USM Beauvoir-sur-Mer (10)	0–2	FC La Montagne (8)
85.	Bernerie OCA (11)	1–2	FC Île de Noirmoutier (10)
86.	Don Bosco Football Nantes (11)	1–1 (4–3 p)	Etoile du Bocage (9)
87.	Saint-Georges Guyonnière FC (9)	2–1	FC Côteaux du Vignoble (8)
88.	EM Sallertaine (11)	1–3	FC Bouaye (8)
89.	US Bernardière-Cugand (9)	1–5	Saint Pierre de Retz (8)
90.	FC Bourgneuf-en-Retz (11)	0–1	Saint-Gilles-Saint-Hilaire FC (11)
91.	Hirondelles Soullandaises (11)	3–3 (2–3 p)	Océane FC (10)
92.	US Simplé-Marigné-Peuton (11)	0–4	AS Val-d'Erdre-Auxence (10)
93.	AS Parné (11)	0–5	USC Pays de Montsurs (8)
94.	AS Grazay (11)	2–1	FC de l'Aisne (10)
95.	USB Juvigné (11)	3–2	Voltigeurs Saint-Georges-Buttavent (9)
96.	US Parigné-sur-Braye (11)	3–4	FC Montjean (10)
97.	EB Commer (11)	3–1	AS Saint-Pierre-des-Nids (10)
98.	ÉS Trélazé (10)	2–1	AS Bayard-Saumur (8)
99.	USC Corné (12)	3–1	Doutre SC (11)
100.	FC Sud Sèvre et Maine (9)	2–3	EA La Tessoualle (8)
101.	AFC Bouin-Bois-de-Céné-Châteauneuf (11)	0–4	FC Entente du Vignoble (10)
102.	AS Chemazé (10)	3–1	US Renazé (10)
103.	ES Loire et Louet (11)	5–1	US Briollay (11)
104.	CA Voutréen (10)	1–4	AS Châtres-la-Forêt (11)
105.	US Toutlemonde Maulévrier (9)	3–0	FC Mouchamps-Rochetrejoux (8)
106.	Larchamp-Montaudin FC (11)	0–2	Gorron FC (8)
107.	Anjou Baconne FC (11)	5–3	FC Ingrandes-le-Fresne (11)
108.	AG Champigné-Querré (11)	4–3	SC Angevin (10)
109.	FC Guémené-Massérac (9)	2–1	Union Brivet Campbon Chapelle-Launay (9)
110.	AS Vaiges (10)	0–2	CA Évronnais (7)
111.	Petit-Mars FC (10)	0–2	Elan Sorinières Football (7)
112.	USA Pouancé (8)	3–1	US Cantenay-Épinard (8)
113.	CS Courbeveille (11)	0–7	US Saint-Pierre-la-Cour (8)
114.	US Désertines (11)	2–5	US Saint-Berthevin (9)
115.	Étoile du Don Moisdon-Meilleraye (11)	0–3	AOS Pontchâteau (9)
116.	Montreuil-Juigné Béné Football (8)	3–1	AS Seiches-sur-le-Loire-Marcé (7)
117.	FC Trois Rivières (10)	2–2 (2–4 p)	Saint-Marc Football (9)
118.	FC Landivy-Pontmain (10)	1–1 (2–4 p)	FC Ambrières (10)
119.	AS Grandchamp Foot (11)	0–4	ES Blain (7)
120.	ÉS Jovéenne (11)	0–6	AS Marsacais (9)
121.	AS Avrillé (9)	4–4 (5–4 p)	Croix Blanche Angers (8)
122.	ASO Montenay (10)	4–1	US Fougerolles-du-Plessis (9)
123.	ES Notre-Dame-des-Landes (10)	3–2	FC Brière (8)
124.	ES Andard-Brain (8)	0–1	ES Bouchemaine (7)
125.	US Saint-Jean-sur-Mayenne (10)	1–2	AS Contest-Saint Baudelle (8)
126.	Olympique Bécon-Villemoisan-Saint-Augustin (8)	1–4	Angers Vaillante Foot (7)
127.	CCS Nantes Saint-Félix (11)	0–8	FC Grand Lieu (9)
128.	FC Pays de Sillé (8)	0–6	Ernéenne Foot (7)
129.	CS Saint-Pierre-des-Landes (10)	0–4	US Aronnaise (9)
130.	ES Varennes Villebernier (12)	1–3	US Mazé (10)
131.	AS Guillaumois (11)	0–0 (4–1 p)	ES Pornichet (8)
132.	AJS Frambaldéenne (11)	1–3	FC Lassay (9)
133.	ES Le Puy-Vaudelnay (11)	0–3	ASR Vernantes-Vernoil (10)
134.	US Vital Frossay (11)	1–8	Saint-Aubin-Guérande Football (7)
135.	FS Champgenéteux (11)	0–3 (Note: Tie won by means of forfeit.)	US Pré-en-Pail (9)
136.	EA Baugeois (10)	3–0	FC Louet-Juignéen (11)
137.	ES Quelainaise (10)	4–1	ASL Montigné-le-Brillant (11)
138.	AC Longué (11)	4–0	FC Plessis Grammoire (11)
139.	AS Landaise (10)	2–4	Sèvremont FC (8)
140.	Alerte de Méan (10)	0–2	US La Baule-Le Pouliguen (7)
141.	FC Villedieu-La Renaudière (12)	1–1 (4–2 p)	Saint-Michel SF (10)
142.	FC Villevêque-Soucelles (11)	2–1	Saint MathMénitRé FC (9)
143.	AS Damvitaise (12)	1–2	Entente Sud Vendée (10)
144.	US Bugallière Orvault (12)	2–8	Couëron Chabossière FC (9)
145.	ES Maisoncelles (11)	2–3	FA Laval (10)
146.	AS Riezaise (12)	0–6	Hermitage Venansault (10)
147.	Intrépide Angers Foot (8)	0–3	US Beaufort-en-Vallée (8)
148.	FC Stephanois (10)	1–5	La Saint-André (9)
149.	AS Paludiers Islais Île-d'Olonne (11)	0–3	FC Jard-Avrillé (8)
150.	FC Pellouailles-Corze (9)	2–0	ES Segré (7)
151.	AS La Madeleine (9)	3–1	ES Dresny-Plessé (9)
152.	AS Bouchamps-lès-Craon (11)	0–1	ES Azé (11)
153.	SSJA Saint-Mathurin (11)	1–3	Coëx Olympique (10)
154.	Brecé Sports (11)	1–3	US Chantrigné (10)
155.	AS Saint-Sylvain-d'Anjou (9)	3–1	RC Doué-la-Fontaine (8)
156.	US Vay (11)	0–3	Savenay-Malville-Prinquiau FC (9)
157.	AS Le Bourgneuf-la-Forêt (9)	2–1	US Réunionnaise (10)
158.	US Saint-Michel Triaize La Tranche Angles (10)	3–1	US Herminoise (10)
159.	Mon Atout FC Angévin (12)	1–0	FC Bout' Loire-et-Evre (11)
160.	FC Toutes Aides Nantes (10)	0–5	Donges FC (9)
161.	ASPTT Laval (10)	2–1	AS Andouillé (9)
162.	SO Fougeré-Thorigny (12)	2–3	Foot Espoir 85 (10)
163.	AS Lac de Maine (9)	2–1	AS Ponts-de-Cé (9)
164.	Les Touches FC (11)	1–3	Sympho Foot Treillières (9)
165.	US Villiers-Charlemagne (10)	3–2	US Le Genest (9)
166.	FC Mesnilaurentais (11)	1–0	FC Saint-Lambert Saint-Jean Saint-Léger Saint-Martin (11)
167.	Temple Cordemais FC (11)	2–3	JGE Sucé-sur-Erdre (8)
168.	AS Ballée (10)	1–2	US Argentré (9)
169.	ES Pineaux (11)	0–8	FC Plaine et Bocage (8)
170.	Saint-Melaine OS (10)	1–0	ES Layon (9)
171.	ES du Lac (10)	1–3	US Lucéene (7)
172.	US Chatillonaise (12)	0–14	AS Martigné-sur-Mayenne (9)
173.	AS Dom-Tom (10)	0–0 (9–10 p)	FC Mouilleron-Thouarsais-Caillère (8)
174.	Olympique Saint-Gemmes-sur-Loire (10)	0–2	Football Chalonnes-Chaudefonds (8)
175.	US Basse-Indre (11)	0–4	ES des Marais (9)
176.	Alerte Ahuillé FC (9)	3–3 (4–2 p)	JS Laval Maghreb (9)
177.	AS Quatre Vents Fontaines (10)	0–1	Sud Vendée Football (8)
178.	ES Gennes-Les Rosiers (10)	2–3	AS Saint-Hilaire-Vihiers-Saint-Paul (8)
179.	Bouguenais Football (9)	2–5	AC Chapelain Foot (7)
180.	US Saint-Germain-le-Fouilloux (10)	1–3	ASL L'Huisserie Foot (9)
181.	ES Rives de l'Yon (10)	0–2	Pays de Chantonnay Foot (8)
182.	ES Auverse-Mouliherne-Chavaignes-Lasse (11)	1–2	CO Castélorien (9)
183.	Saint-Cyr Foot Herbignac (10	0–5	FC La Chapelle-des-Marais (8)
184.	FC Ruillé-Loiron (10)	0–5	Hermine Saint-Ouennaise (8)
185.	Saint-Pierre Sportif Nieul-le-Dolent (10)	1–6	La France d'Aizenay (7)
186.	ES Morannes (10)	1–3	ES Aubance (7)
187.	JA Nesmy (11)	1–1 (3–4 p)	ES Grosbreuil-Girouard (9)
188.	AS Sigournais-Saint Germain (12)	0–0 (3–5 p)	FC Saint-Philbert-Réorthe-Jaudonnière (11)
189.	FC Talmondais (10)	3–0	FC Saint-Julien-Vairé (8)
190.	FC Cantonal Sud Vendée (10)	1–3	FC Nieul-Maillezais-Les Autises (9)
191.	Espérance Saint-Yves Nantes (11)	1–1 (4–2 p)	ES Haute Goulaine (9)
192.	US Vouvant Bourneau Cezais (12)	1–1 (5–6 p)	US Mesnard-Vendrennes (11)
193.	Missillac FC (11)	1–10	FC Immaculée (9)
194.	Nozay OS (10)	3–1	JA Saint-Mars-du-Désert (9)
195.	FC Le Gâvre-La Chevallerais (12)	1–1 (6–7 p)	Sainte-Reine-Crossac Football (9)
196.	BoupèreMonProuant FC (9)	1–3	RC Cholet (8)
197.	Amicale Saint-Lyphard (11)	0–4	FC Presqu'île Vilaine (10)
198.	Étoile du Cens Nantes (13)	0–6	Héric FC (9)
199.	Commequiers SF (10)	1–1 (3–1 p)	US Aubigny (8)
200.	Herblanetz FC (11)	0–5	Nantes Saint-Pierre (8)
201.	Loups Sportifs Sainte-Flaive-des-Loups (9)	2–2 (4–5 p)	La Chaize FEC (8)
202.	FC Fay Bouvron (10)	4–3	ES Maritime (9)
203.	JF Boissière-des-Landes (10)	3–3 (3–1 p)	FC Saligny (9)
204.	Saint-Joseph de Porterie Nantes (11)	0–10	US Thouaré (9)
205.	FC Langonnais (7)	0–6	Entente Cheffois-Antigny-Saint-Maurice (8)
206.	FC OsmanliSport (12)	0–1	AS Sion-Lusanger (12)
207.	US Suplice André Mormaison (10)	0–4	US Chauché (8)
208.	Orvault RC (10)	2–1	FC Basse Loire (9)
209.	AS Valanjou (10)	0–2	AS Boufféré (8)
210.	RAC Cheminots Nantes (12)	2–7	CS Montoirin (9)
211.	US Autize Vendée (11)	2–5	US Bazoges Beaurepaire (10)
212.	Bé-Léger FC (10)	1–2	Vigilante Saint Fulgent (8)
213.	Étoile de Vie Le Fenouiller (9)	0–3	FC Achards (8)
214.	Gaubretière-Saint-Martin FC (10)	2–3	FC Fief Gesté (9)
215.	AS Salle-Aubry-Poitevinière (11)	0–3	FC Essartais (7)
216.	AS Mauges (11)	2–4	FC Saint-Laurent Malvent (9)
217.	AS Saint-Gervais (11)	1–1 (5–3 p)	ES Vertou (9)
218.	Nantes La Mellinet (9)	5–1	Arche FC (10)
219.	JA Besné (12)	0–5	Métallo Sport Chantenaysien (10)
220.	US Villepotaise (12)	0–3	UFC Erdre et Donneau (10)
221.	AF Apremont-La Chapelle (11)	2–2 (3–2 p)	ES Belleville-sur-Vie (10)
222.	Union Méan Penhoët (12)	0–3	FC Côte Sauvage (10)
223.	AS Landevieille (11)	2–5	FC Généraudière Roche Sud (9)
224.	FC Atlantique Morbihan (10)	0–4	SC Avessac-Fégréac (8)
225.	US Landeronde-Saint-Georges (11)	1–5	ES Marsouins Brétignolles-Brem (7)
226.	Saint-Herblain OC (9)	2–3	ES Vigneux (7)
227.	RS Les Clouzeaux (10)	0–2	Mouilleron SF (7)
228.	AS Maine (10)	2–0	AEPR Rezé (8)
229.	AS Moutiers-Saint-Avaugourd (11)	3–4	Sainte-Foy FC (10)
230.	Nant'Est FC (9)	1–2	USJA Carquefou (7)
231.	ES Longevillaise (10)	1–1 (2–4 p)	FC Robretières La Roche-sur-Yon (8)
232.	Eclair de Chauvé (11)	1–4	Alliance Sud-Retz Machecoul (8)
233.	ES La Copechagnière (11)	0–2	Luçon FC (7)
234.	US Bournezeau-Saint-Hilaire (9)	1–1 (2–4 p)	FC Montaigu 85 (7)
235.	US Gouldoisienne (11)	2–1	FC Chavagnes-La Rabatelière (9)
236.	FC Givrand l'Aiguillon (11)	0–6	FC La Génétouze (9)
237.	Saint-Martin Treize Septiers (10)	2–0	ES Saint-Denis-la-Chevasse (9)
238.	Les Farfadets Saint-Paul-en-Pareds (11)	0–2	FC Cécilien Martinoyen (8)
239.	As Le Bailleul Crosmières (11)	1–5	SS Noyen-sur-Sarthe (8)
240.	FC Vallons le Pin (11)	1–7	UF Saint-Herblain (8)
241.	AS Saint-Maixent-sur-Vie (10)	2–3	US La Ferrière Dompierre (9)

=== Second round ===
These matches were played on 5 September 2021.

Second round results: Pays de la Loire
Tie no	Home team (tier)	Score	Away team (tier)
1.	AS Le-Puy-Saint-Bonnet (9)	2–0	FC Meilleraie-Montournais-Menomblet (10)
2.	FC Layon (9)	5–2	US Les Epesses-Saint-Mars (10)
3.	FF Mortagne-sur-Sèvre (10)	0–5	EA La Tessoualle (8)
4.	Vigilante Saint Fulgent (8)	1–4	Olympique Chemillé-Melay (7)
5.	FC Saint-Laurent Malvent (9)	1–1 (5–6 p)	Christophe-Séguinière (8)
6.	US Dionysienne (8)	0–3	FC Pellouailles-Corze (9)
7.	Sèvremont FC (8)	5–1	Saint-Pierre Mazières (9)
8.	US Beaufort-en-Vallée (8)	3–3 (4–5 p)	AS Lac de Maine (9)
9.	FC Ménil (10)	2–1	Anjou Baconne FC (11)
10.	ES Azé (11)	1–1 (6–5 p)	AG Champigné-Querré (11)
11.	CS Lion d'Angers (10)	4–0	AS Chemazé (10)
12.	SA Mamertins (7)	2–0	US Arnage Pontlieue (8)
13.	AS Saint-Jean-d'Assé (9)	0–6	ES Yvré-l'Évêque (8)
14.	GSI Saosnois Courgains (11)	0–2	ES Moncé (8)
15.	US Précigné (10)	0–6	AS Le Mans Villaret (7)
16.	JS Ludoise (9)	1–3	CS Changé (7)
17.	Internationale du Mans (10)	1–0	US Glonnières (8)
18.	AS Ruaudin (9)	1–2	Écommoy FC (8)
19.	US Bouloire (9)	1–6	FC La Bazoge (8)
20.	AS Neuville-sur-Sarthe (10)	3–8	US Vibraysienne (9)
21.	ES Champfleur (10)	0–3	JS Allonnes (8)
22.	La Vigilante Mayet (9)	1–5	AS La Chapelle-Saint-Aubin (8)
23.	US Conlie Domfront (9)	0–2	Auvers Poillé Brulon FC (7)
24.	Sainte-Jamme Sportive (10)	0–12	US Nautique Spay (7)
25.	Degré FC (11)	0–4	EG Rouillon (8)
26.	SO Maine (9)	0–4	US Guécélard (8)
27.	Beaumont SA (8)	1–2	Louverné Sports (7)
28.	JS Solesmienne (8)	2–3	USC Pays de Montsurs (8)
29.	AS Saint-Sylvain-d'Anjou (9)	4–3	CA Loué (8)
30.	Aiglons Durtalois (11)	1–2	CO Castélorien (9)
31.	AC Longué (11)	0–3	SS Noyen-sur-Sarthe (8)
32.	EA Baugeois (10)	6–2	US Mansigné (8)
33.	AS Val-d'Erdre-Auxence (10)	2–2 (5–4 p)	ASPTT Laval (10)
34.	Andrezé-Jub-Jallais FC (9)	2–1	FC Oudon-Couffé (10)
35.	Réveil Saint-Géréon (10)	4–1	FC Castelvarennais (11)
36.	Landreau-Loroux OSC (8)	2–1	US Toutlemonde Maulévrier (9)
37.	FC Entente du Vignoble (10)	0–2	Saint-André-Saint-Macaire FC (8)
38.	FC Mesnilaurentais (11)	1–5	US Thouaré (9)
39.	FC Gétigné-Boussay (10)	0–4	'RC Cholet (8)
40.	FC Montjean (10)	1–2	CF Châtelais-Nyoiseau-Bouillé-Grugé (10)
41.	Olympique Sal-Tour Vézins Coron (10)	2–0	ES Loire et Louet (11)
42.	FC Fief Gesté (9)	1–1 (2–4 p)	AS Mésanger (10)
43.	UFC Erdre et Donneau (10)	2–3	AS Saint-Pierre-Montrevault (7)
44.	SC Nord Atlantique (9)	0–0 (4–3 p)	SC Avessac-Fégréac (8)
45.	ES des Marais (9)	2–1	Écureils des Pays de Monts (8)
46.	Sympho Foot Treillières (9)	0–3	FC La Chapelle-des-Marais (8)
47.	FC Bouaye (8)	3–2	US Bequots-Lucquois (8)
48.	AS Sion-Lusanger (12)	0–0 (4–3 p)	ASL L'Huisserie Foot (9)
49.	FC Grand Lieu (9)	2–1	FC Montaigu 85 (7)
50.	AS Boufféré (8)	1–0	Étoile de Clisson (7)
51.	ES Vallet (9)	1–2	FC Bouaine Rocheservière (9)
52.	Saint-Georges Guyonnière FC (9)	2–6	Élan de Gorges Foot (7)
53.	FC Garnachois (9)	0–1	AS Maine (10)
54.	FC Île de Noirmoutier (10)	0–1	Elan Sorinières Football (7)
55.	FA Laval (10)	0–1	SC Sainte-Gemmes-d'Andigné (10)
56.	US Saint-Berthevin (9)	1–1 (4–5 p)	USA Pouancé (8)
57.	JA Soulgé-sur-Ouette (8)	0–0 (5–4 p)	FC Saint-Saturnin-La Milesse (8)
58.	FC Château-Gontier (8)	2–1	FC Guémené-Massérac (9)
59.	AS Marsacais (9)	1–1 (5–4 p)	Athletic Laigné-Loigné (8)
60.	Jeunes d'Erbray (8)	3–1	ES Craon (8)
61.	Sainte-Foy FC (10)	0–2	FC Robretières La Roche-sur-Yon (8)
62.	Hermitage Venansault (10)	1–2	Entente Cheffois-Antigny-Saint-Maurice (8)
63.	JF Boissière-des-Landes (10)	0–2	FC Plaine et Bocage (8)
64.	FC Mouilleron-Thouarsais-Caillère (8)	0–1	Luçon FC (7)
65.	La Chaize FEC (8)	2–2 (5–4 p)	Sud Vendée Football (8)
66.	ES Grosbreuil-Girouard (9)	0–7	Mareuil SC (7)
67.	Commequiers SF (10)	0–4	La France d'Aizenay (7)
68.	Coëx Olympique (10)	1–1 (2–3 p)	Mouilleron SF (7)
69.	US Bazoges Beaurepaire (10)	0–3	FC Cécilien Martinoyen (8)
70.	Foot Espoir 85 (10)	1–1 (2–4 p)	Pays de Chantonnay Foot (8)
71.	US Gouldoisienne (11)	0–2	Saint-Martin Treize Septiers (10)
72.	Nozay OS (10)	3–0	Union Saint-Leger-Saint-Germain-Champtocé Avenir (10)
73.	Football Chalonnes-Chaudefonds (8)	2–2 (4–5 p)	US Loire et Divatte (7)
74.	US Argentré (9)	1–1 (3–1 p)	US Forcé (8)
75.	Gorron FC (8)	1–3	Hermine Saint-Ouennaise (8)
76.	AS Saint-Hilaire-Vihiers-Saint-Paul (8)	1–1 (4–3 p)	Nantes La Mellinet (9)
77.	US Mesnard-Vendrennes (11)	1–5	LSG Les Brouzils (7)
78.	AS Grazay (11)	1–6	AS Contest-Saint Baudelle (8)
79.	US Varades (8)	3–1	CAS Possosavennières (9)
80.	AS Saint-Gervais (11)	1–1 (2–4 p)	FC La Génétouze (9)
81.	USB Juvigné (11)	2–2 (4–2 p)	US Saint-Pierre-la-Cour (8)
82.	US La Ferrière Dompierre (9)	1–2	FC Talmondais (10)
83.	EB Commer (11)	0–4	US Chantrigné (10)
84.	ASVR Ambillou-Château (11)	5–0	AS Avrillé (9)
85.	FC Généraudière Roche Sud (9)	1–0	ES Marsouins Brétignolles-Brem (7)
86.	AS Le Bourgneuf-la-Forêt (9)	2–3	Ernéenne Foot (7)
87.	Saint-Gilles-Saint-Hilaire FC (11)	0–3	FC Jard-Avrillé (8)
88.	FC Fay Bouvron (10)	6–2	Espérance Saint-Yves Nantes (11)
89.	Orvault RC (10)	1–2	Saint Pierre de Retz (8)
90.	UF Saint-Herblain (8)	3–0	US Lucéene (7)
91.	FC Presqu'île Vilaine (10)	0–3	La Saint-André (9)
92.	FC La Montagne (8)	1–4	AC Saint-Brevin (7)
93.	AF Apremont-La Chapelle (11)	0–5	FC Achards (8)
94.	Mon Atout FC Angévin (12)	6–7	UF Allonnes-Brain-sur-Allonnes (10)
95.	FC Retz (8)	2–0	US Chauché (8)
96.	FC Saint-Philbert-Réorthe-Jaudonnière (11)	2–0	FC Nieul-Maillezais-Les Autises (9)
97.	Océane FC (10)	1–2	Don Bosco Football Nantes (11)
98.	AS Châtres-la-Forêt (11)	2–2 (3–1 p)	US Villiers-Charlemagne (10)
99.	Entente Sud Vendée (10)	0–2	US Saint-Michel Triaize La Tranche Angles (10)
100.	JGE Sucé-sur-Erdre (8)	1–7	ES Blain (7)
101.	ASR Vernantes-Vernoil (10)	2–0	FC Villevêque-Soucelles (11)
102.	Savenay-Malville-Prinquiau FC (9)	1–1 (2–4 p)	AC Chapelain Foot (7)
103.	US Aronnaise (9)	6–1	Alerte Ahuillé FC (9)
104.	Métallo Sport Chantenaysien (10)	1–3	ASC Saint-Médard-de-Doulon Nantes (7)
105.	US Laval (8)	0–0 (4–5 p)	FC Lassay (9)
106.	ES Notre-Dame-des-Landes (10)	0–2	ES Vigneux (7)
107.	FC Longuenée-en-Anjou (9)	0–3	ES Bouchemaine (7)
108.	Sainte-Reine-Crossac Football (9)	2–2 (4–2 p)	Saint-Aubin-Guérande Football (7)
109.	FC Ambrières (10)	2–4	ASO Montenay (10)
110.	Alliance Sud-Retz Machecoul (8)	0–1	FC Essartais (7)
111.	AS Guillaumois (11)	1–4	AS La Madeleine (9)
112.	US Mazé (10)	2–4	ÉS Trélazé (10)
113.	FC Immaculée (9)	1–2	Nantes Saint-Pierre (8)
114.	US Pré-en-Pail (9)	2–3	CA Évronnais (7)
115.	Couëron Chabossière FC (9)	2–1	Saint-Marc Football (9)
116.	CS Montoirin (9)	0–6	USJA Carquefou (7)
117.	AOS Pontchâteau (9)	0–3	US La Baule-Le Pouliguen (7)
118.	Héric FC (9)	1–4	Nort ACF (8)
119.	ES Quelainaise (10)	0–1	AS Martigné-sur-Mayenne (9)
120.	FC Côte Sauvage (10)	1–0	Donges FC (9)
121.	AS Tiercé-Cheffes (8)	1–4	ES Aubance (7)
122.	USC Corné (12)	0–8	Saint-Melaine OS (10)
123.	Angers Vaillante Foot (7)	1–3	Montreuil-Juigné Béné Football (8)
124.	Sainte Christine-Bourgneuf FC (10)	0–5	Olympique Liré-Drain (8)
125.	FC Villedieu-La Renaudière (12)	0–1	ES Montilliers (8)

=== Third round ===
These matches were played on 17, 18 and 19 September 2021.

Third round results: Pays de la Loire
Tie no	Home team (tier)	Score	Away team (tier)
1.	USSA Vertou (5)	8–0	A.S. Saint Pierraise (Saint Pierre and Miquelon)
2.	CA Évronnais (7)	1–2	US Changé (5)
3.	AS Marsacais (9)	1–3	Vendée Poiré-sur-Vie Football (5)
4.	Nort ACF (8)	2–3	AS Sautron (5)
5.	La France d'Aizenay (7)	0–6	Olympique Saumur FC (5)
6.	Luçon FC (7)	1–1 (3–1 p)	AS La Châtaigneraie (5)
7.	FC La Génétouze (9)	1–5	Saint-Nazaire AF (6)
8.	FC La Chapelle-des-Marais (8)	1–2	Orvault SF (6)
9.	ES Moncé (8)	0–3	FC Pellouailles-Corze (9)
10.	FC Plaine et Bocage (8)	1–1 (4–2 p)	TVEC Les Sables-d'Olonne (6)
11.	US Aronnaise (9)	0–2	VS Fertois (6)
12.	SS Noyen-sur-Sarthe (8)	0–1	AS Saint-Hilaire-Vihiers-Saint-Paul (8)
13.	ASO Montenay (10)	2–1	JA Soulgé-sur-Ouette (8)
14.	AC Chapelain Foot (7)	2–1	AC Saint-Brevin (7)
15.	AS La Madeleine (9)	3–0	Nozay OS (10)
16.	FC Robretières La Roche-sur-Yon (8)	0–2	FC Bouaye (8)
17.	ES Bouchemaine (7)	1–3	Ancienne Château-Gontier (6)
18.	Saint-Martin Treize Septiers (10)	0–5	FC Rezé (6)
19.	Couëron Chabossière FC (9)	1–2	CS Lion d'Angers (10)
20.	ES Azé (11)	0–0 (4–3 p)	AS Val-d'Erdre-Auxence (10)
21.	FC Achards (8)	1–1 (5–4 p)	ES Blain (7)
22.	UF Allonnes-Brain-sur-Allonnes (10)	3–1	Entente Cheffois-Antigny-Saint-Maurice (8)
23.	ES Aubance (7)	2–1	ES Bonchamp (6)
24.	JS Allonnes (8)	5–1	US Argentré (9)
25.	La Saint-André (9)	1–1 (5–4 p)	FC Grand Lieu (9)
26.	EA La Tessoualle (8)	1–0	US Varades (8)
27.	Olympique Sal-Tour Vézins Coron (10)	0–5	US Philbertine Football (5)
28.	US Guécélard (8)	0–1	FE Trélazé (6)
29.	US Nautique Spay (7)	7–1	AS Contest-Saint Baudelle (8)
30.	FC Lassay (9)	0–0 (5–4 p)	Écommoy FC (8)
31.	Elan Sorinières Football (7)	0–1	Pouzauges Bocage FC (5)
32.	FC Essartais (7)	3–1	LSG Les Brouzils (7)
33.	FC Cécilien Martinoyen (8)	1–3	FC Olonne Château (6)
34.	US La Baule-Le Pouliguen (7)	3–1	Saint-Sébastien FC (6)
35.	Auvers Poillé Brulon FC (7)	3–1	Jeunes d'Erbray (8)
36.	Pays de Chantonnay Foot (8)	2–0	FC Généraudière Roche Sud (9)
37.	Saint-Melaine OS (10)	0–3	AS Bourny Laval (6)
38.	US Saint-Michel Triaize La Tranche Angles (10)	1–1 (7–6 p)	UF Saint-Herblain (8)
39.	FC Ménil (10)	1–9	La Suze FC (6)
40.	AS Sion-Lusanger (12)	3–3 (6–5 p)	AS Mésanger (10)
41.	Saint-André-Saint-Macaire FC (8)	1–4	FC Layon (9)
42.	ASR Vernantes-Vernoil (10)	0–6	La Roche VF (5)
43.	Don Bosco Football Nantes (11)	1–4	Olympique Liré-Drain (8)
44.	AS Boufféré (8)	0–5	JSC Bellevue Nantes (6)
45.	Ernéenne Foot (7)	2–3	JS Coulaines (6)
46.	CF Châtelais-Nyoiseau-Bouillé-Grugé (10)	0–2	Stade Mayennais FC (6)
47.	US Vibraysienne (9)	4–1	AS Saint-Sylvain-d'Anjou (9)
48.	Réveil Saint-Géréon (10)	5–3	Montreuil-Juigné Béné Football (8)
49.	SC Nord Atlantique (9)	0–0 (2–4 p)	ES des Marais (9)
50.	Internationale du Mans (10)	0–3	Olympique Chemillé-Melay (7)
51.	Mouilleron SF (7)	1–0	Landreau-Loroux OSC (8)
52.	Sèvremont FC (8)	0–3	FC Challans (5)
53.	Christophe-Séguinière (8)	1–1 (4–5 p)	ESOF La Roche-sur-Yon (6)
54.	US Chantrigné (10)	2–0	ES Yvré-l'Évêque (8)
55.	AS Châtres-la-Forêt (11)	0–9	La Flèche RC (6)
56.	AS Martigné-sur-Mayenne (9)	1–1 (4–5 p)	EG Rouillon (8)
57.	AS Maine (10)	3–2	ES Vigneux (7)
58.	AS La Chapelle-Saint-Aubin (8)	1–2	AS Le Mans Villaret (7)
59.	ÉS Trélazé (10)	0–5	USJA Carquefou (7)
60.	FC Bouaine Rocheservière (9)	1–1 (4–3 p)	ASI Mûrs-Erigné (6)
61.	SC Sainte-Gemmes-d'Andigné (10)	2–1	AS Lac de Maine (9)
62.	USA Pouancé (8)	1–1 (5–4 p)	USC Pays de Montsurs (8)
63.	Mareuil SC (7)	1–0	Vendée Fontenay Foot (5)
64.	FC La Bazoge (8)	1–3	AS Mulsanne-Teloché (6)
65.	US Thouaré (9)	1–1 (1–4 p)	Sainte-Reine-Crossac Football (9)
66.	FC Fay Bouvron (10)	0–2	NDC Angers (6)
67.	FC Talmondais (10)	1–0	FC Saint-Philbert-Réorthe-Jaudonnière (11)
68.	SA Mamertins (7)	2–1	FC Château-Gontier (8)
69.	Élan de Gorges Foot (7)	2–1	FC Retz (8)
70.	RC Cholet (8)	4–2	Andrezé-Jub-Jallais FC (9)
71.	FC Jard-Avrillé (8)	1–1 (5–6 p)	La Chaize FEC (8)
72.	CO Castélorien (9)	0–2	Louverné Sports (7)
73.	CS Changé (7)	0–5	SC Beaucouzé (6)
74.	AS Saint-Pierre-Montrevault (7)	1–0	Sablé FC (5)
75.	FC Côte Sauvage (10)	1–2	Nantes Saint-Pierre (8)
76.	ASVR Ambillou-Château (11)	3–2	ASC Saint-Médard-de-Doulon Nantes (7)
77.	ES Montilliers (8)	2–0	AC Basse-Goulaine (6)
78.	Saint Pierre de Retz (8)	0–4	US Loire et Divatte (7)
79.	USB Juvigné (11)	0–4	Hermine Saint-Ouennaise (8)
80.	AS Le-Puy-Saint-Bonnet (9)	0–0 (1–3 p)	EA Baugeois (10)

=== Fourth round ===
These matches were played on 2 and 3 October 2021.

Fourth round results: Pays de la Loire
Tie no	Home team (tier)	Score	Away team (tier)
1.	La Roche VF (5)	2–1	FC Challans (5)
2.	Saint-Nazaire AF (6)	1–1 (4–5 p)	AC Chapelain Foot (7)
3.	La Flèche RC (6)	1–2	AS Mulsanne-Teloché (6)
4.	US Chantrigné (10)	2–2 (6–5 p)	SA Mamertins (7)
5.	VS Fertois (6)	1–1 (4–5 p)	US Loire et Divatte (7)
6.	EA Baugeois (10)	0–6	Les Herbiers VF (4)
7.	USA Pouancé (8)	3–1	FC Achards (8)
8.	CS Lion d'Angers (10)	1–1 (4–1 p)	La Chaize FEC (8)
9.	AS Bourny Laval (6)	2–1	US Changé (5)
10.	FC Layon (9)	4–2	US Vibraysienne (9)
11.	FE Trélazé (6)	0–1	US Nautique Spay (7)
12.	ASO Montenay (10)	0–4	USSA Vertou (5)
13.	UF Allonnes-Brain-sur-Allonnes (10)	2–3	Orvault SF (6)
14.	JS Coulaines (6)	3–1	Olympique Chemillé-Melay (7)
15.	FC Bouaine Rocheservière (9)	0–3	La Suze FC (6)
16.	EA La Tessoualle (8)	1–4	Ancienne Château-Gontier (6)
17.	US Saint-Michel Triaize La Tranche Angles (10)	1–3	Auvers Poillé Brulon FC (7)
18.	ES Azé (11)	0–10	Olympique Saumur FC (5)
19.	ES Aubance (7)	1–2	US Philbertine Football (5)
20.	Nantes Saint-Pierre (8)	1–0	FC Essartais (7)
21.	AS Saint-Hilaire-Vihiers-Saint-Paul (8)	1–3	FC Olonne Château (6)
22.	ES Montilliers (8)	3–1	AS La Madeleine (9)
23.	Louverné Sports (7)	0–0 (3–5 p)	JS Allonnes (8)
24.	AS Maine (10)	1–3	AS Le Mans Villaret (7)
25.	RC Cholet (8)	3–1	Élan de Gorges Foot (7)
26.	ES des Marais (9)	0–4	ESOF La Roche-sur-Yon (6)
27.	FC Lassay (9)	0–3	Voltigeurs de Châteaubriant (4)
28.	SC Sainte-Gemmes-d'Andigné (10)	2–4	La Saint-André (9)
29.	EG Rouillon (8)	0–2	AS Sautron (5)
30.	FC Talmondais (10)	0–6	SC Beaucouzé (6)
31.	Mareuil SC (7)	0–2	Vendée Poiré-sur-Vie Football (5)
32.	Olympique Liré-Drain (8)	1–3	USJA Carquefou (7)
33.	NDC Angers (6)	2–0	Mouilleron SF (7)
34.	Luçon FC (7)	2–0	Pays de Chantonnay Foot (8)
35.	Sainte-Reine-Crossac Football (9)	1–2	FC Plaine et Bocage (8)
36.	ASVR Ambillou-Château (11)	2–3	FC Rezé (6)
37.	AS Sion-Lusanger (12)	0–3	FC Pellouailles-Corze (9)
38.	Hermine Saint-Ouennaise (8)	3–4	AS Saint-Pierre-Montrevault (7)
39.	Réveil Saint-Géréon (10)	0–3	FC Bouaye (8)
40.	JSC Bellevue Nantes (6)	0–2	Stade Mayennais FC (6)
41.	US La Baule-Le Pouliguen (7)	1–2	Pouzauges Bocage FC (5)

=== Fifth round ===
These matches were played on 16 and 17 October 2021.

Fifth round results: Pays de la Loire
Tie no	Home team (tier)	Score	Away team (tier)
1.	USA Pouancé (8)	1–1 (3–4 p)	AS Sautron (5)
2.	La Saint-André (9)	0–4	USJA Carquefou (7)
3.	US Chantrigné (10)	0–6	Stade Lavallois (3)
4.	Nantes Saint-Pierre (8)	1–1 (4–3 p)	Ancienne Château-Gontier (6)
5.	Auvers Poillé Brulon FC (7)	2–2 (3–4 p)	AS Saint-Pierre-Montrevault (7)
6.	FC Bouaye (8)	0–4	Les Herbiers VF (4)
7.	SC Beaucouzé (6)	5–0	AS Bourny Laval (6)
8.	Olympique Saumur FC (5)	4–1 (Note: Tie reversed from original draw.)	NDC Angers (6)
9.	RC Cholet (8)	0–8	USSA Vertou (5)
10.	FC Plaine et Bocage (8)	0–3	Pouzauges Bocage FC (5)
11.	AS Mulsanne-Teloché (6)	0–2	Voltigeurs de Châteaubriant (4)
12.	FC Layon (9)	0–3	La Suze FC (6)
13.	JS Coulaines (6)	0–3	SO Cholet (3)
14.	FC Pellouailles-Corze (9)	1–0	Orvault SF (6)
15.	US Nautique Spay (7)	0–2	AS Le Mans Villaret (7)
16.	US Loire et Divatte (7)	1–5	La Roche VF (5)
17.	AC Chapelain Foot (7)	0–3	Le Mans FC (3)
18.	JS Allonnes (8)	2–3	ESOF La Roche-sur-Yon (6)
19.	CS Lion d'Angers (10)	2–3	Luçon FC (7)
20.	ES Montilliers (8)	1–4	US Philbertine Football (5)
21.	FC Olonne Château (6)	0–0 (4–2 p)	FC Rezé (6)
22.	Stade Mayennais FC (6)	0–6	Vendée Poiré-sur-Vie Football (5)

=== Sixth round ===
These matches were played on 30 and 31 October 2021.

Sixth round results: Pays de la Loire
Tie no	Home team (tier)	Score	Away team (tier)
1.	Nantes Saint-Pierre (8)	0–2	SO Cholet (3)
2.	Pouzauges Bocage FC (5)	1–2	Le Mans FC (3)
3.	FC Pellouailles-Corze (9)	0–4	Olympique Saumur FC (5)
4.	AS Sautron (5)	2–4	ESOF La Roche-sur-Yon (6)
5.	Vendée Poiré-sur-Vie Football (5)	0–0 (2–4 p)	La Roche VF (5)
6.	SC Beaucouzé (6)	1–2	Les Herbiers VF (4)
7.	FC Olonne Château (6)	1–3	Voltigeurs de Châteaubriant (4)
8.	USSA Vertou (5)	1–2	Stade Lavallois (3)
9.	Luçon FC (7)	3–0	AS Le Mans Villaret (7)
10.	AS Saint-Pierre-Montrevault (7)	1–1 (2–3 p)	USJA Carquefou (7)
11.	La Suze FC (6)	1–1 (5–6 p)	US Philbertine Football (5)
