= 2014 FIFA World Cup qualification – CAF first round =

This page provides the summaries of the CAF first round matches for 2014 FIFA World Cup qualification.

== Format ==
In this round the twenty-four lowest seeded teams were drawn into 12 home-and-away ties, at the World Cup Preliminary Draw at the Marina da Glória in Rio de Janeiro, Brazil on 30 July 2011.

The matches were scheduled to be held with first legs on 11 November 2011 and second legs on 15 November 2011. The 12 winners advanced to the second round of the African qualifiers.

== Seeding ==
The July 2011 FIFA Ranking was used to seed the teams.

Pot 1	Pot 2
Mozambique; DR Congo; Togo; Liberia; Tanzania; Congo; Kenya; Rwanda; Ethiopia; Namibia; Burundi; Madagascar	Guinea-Bissau; Equatorial Guinea; Chad; Swaziland; Comoros; Lesotho; Eritrea; Somalia; Djibouti; Mauritius; Seychelles; São Tomé and Príncipe

== Results ==
Team 1	Agg.	Team 2	1st leg	2nd leg
Seychelles	0–7	Kenya	0–3	0–4
Guinea-Bissau	1–2	Togo	1–1	0–1
Djibouti	0–8	Namibia	0–4	0–4
Mauritius	w/o (Note: Liberia automatically advanced to the second round as Mauritius withdrew from the tournament on 31 October 2011.)	Liberia	—	—
Comoros	1–5	Mozambique	0–1	1–4
Equatorial Guinea	3–2	Madagascar	2–0	1–2
Somalia	0–5	Ethiopia	0–0	0–5
Lesotho	3–2	Burundi	1–0	2–2
Eritrea	2–4	Rwanda	1–1	1–3
Swaziland	2–8	DR Congo	1–3	1–5
São Tomé and Príncipe	1–6	Congo	0–5	1–1
Chad	2–2 (a)	Tanzania	1–2	1–0

11 November 2011
17:00 UTC+4

Seychelles	0–3	Kenya
	Report	Ochieng 41'; Oliech 75', 81'

Stade Linité, Victoria
Attendance: 2,000
Referee: Dennis Batte (Uganda)
15 November 2011
16:00 UTC+3

Kenya	4–0	Seychelles
Onyango 19'; Oliech 36'; Mulama 45+1'; Wanyama 74'	Report

Nyayo National Stadium, Nairobi
Attendance: 5,000
Referee: Victor Gomes (South Africa)

Kenya won 7–0 on aggregate and advanced to the second round.

11 November 2011
16:00 UTC±0

Guinea-Bissau	1–1	Togo
de Carvalho 38'	Report	Gakpé 32'

Estádio Lino Correia, Bissau
Attendance: 3,000
Referee: Malang Diedhiou (Senegal)
15 November 2011
15:30 UTC±0

Togo	1–0	Guinea-Bissau
Jonas 3' (o.g.)	Report

Stade de Kégué, Lomé
Attendance: 25,000
Referee: Mal Mohamadou (Cameroon)

Togo won 2–1 on aggregate and advanced to the second round.

11 November 2011
15:00 UTC+3

Djibouti	0–4	Namibia
	Report	Bester 13', 52'; Kaimbi 50'; Urikhob 88'

Stade National Gouled, Djibouti
Attendance: 3,000
Referee: Tessema Bamlak (Ethiopia)
15 November 2011
20:00 UTC+2

Namibia	4–0	Djibouti
Isaacks 17'; Kaimbi 34', 58'; Urikhob 81'	Report

Sam Nujoma Stadium, Windhoek
Attendance: 2,145
Referee: Samuel Chirindza (Mozambique)

Namibia won 8–0 on aggregate and advanced to the second round.

11 November 2011
15:00 UTC+3

Comoros	0–1	Mozambique
	Report	Miro 54' (pen.)

Stade Said Mohamed Cheikh, Mitsamiouli
Attendance: 3,000
Referee: David Jane (Lesotho)
15 November 2011
19:00 UTC+2

Mozambique	4–1	Comoros
Domingues 26'; Sitoe 45'; Whiskey 59'; Baúque 84'	Report	Youssouf 72'

Estádio do Zimpeto, Maputo
Attendance: 10,000
Referee: Ruzive Ruzive (Zimbabwe)

Mozambique won 5–1 on aggregate and advanced to the second round.

11 November 2011
16:00 UTC+1

Equatorial Guinea	2–0	Madagascar
Juvenal 20' (pen.); Randy 74'	Report

Estadio de Malabo, Malabo
Attendance: 10,000
Referee: Eric Otogo-Castane (Gabon)
15 November 2011
15:50 UTC+3

Madagascar	2–1	Equatorial Guinea
Rajoarimanana 54'; Ramanamahefa 90'	Report	Ellong 24'

Mahamasina Municipal Stadium, Antananarivo
Attendance: 5,000
Referee: Parmendra Nunkoo (Mauritius)

Equatorial Guinea won 3–2 on aggregate and advanced to the second round.

12 November 2011
15:45 UTC+3

Somalia	0–0	Ethiopia
	Report

Stade National Gouled, Djibouti (Djibouti) (Note: Due to the lack of security in Mogadishu, Somalia's home game was played at a neutral venue. An earlier Somali request for the match to be played in Nairobi was rejected by FIFA due to a ban on international matches being played in Kenya.)
Attendance: 3,000
Referee: Mohamed Hassan Ourouke (Djibouti)
16 November 2011
16:00 UTC+3

Ethiopia	5–0	Somalia
Oumed O. 5'; Shimelis B. 62', 65'; Getaneh K. 87', 90+2'	Report

Addis Ababa Stadium, Addis Ababa
Attendance: 22,000
Referee: Med Said Kordi (Tunisia)

Ethiopia won 5–0 on aggregate and advanced to the second round.

11 November 2011
20:00 UTC+2

Lesotho	1–0	Burundi
Ramabele 82'	Report

Setsoto National Stadium, Maseru
Attendance: 5,000
Referee: Rainhold Shikongo (Namibia)
15 November 2011
14:30 UTC+2

Burundi	2–2	Lesotho
Amissi 29'; Ndikumana 88' (pen.)	Report	Tale 16'; Mothoana 22'

Prince Louis Rwagasore Stadium, Bujumbura
Attendance: 7,200
Referee: Anthony Ramsy Raphael (Malawi)

Lesotho won 3–2 on aggregate and advanced to the second round.

11 November 2011
15:30 UTC+3

Eritrea	1–1	Rwanda
Tekle 35'	Report	Uzamukunda 58'

Cicero Stadium, Asmara
Attendance: 6,000
Referee: Mahamadou Keita (Mali)
15 November 2011
15:30 UTC+2

Rwanda	3–1	Eritrea
Karekezi 4'; Iranzi 70'; Bokota 79'	Report	Tedros 89'

Stade Amahoro, Kigali
Attendance: 10,000
Referee: Joshua Bondo (Botswana)

Rwanda won 4–2 on aggregate and advanced to the second round.

11 November 2011
16:00 UTC+2

Swaziland	1–3	DR Congo
Shongwe 63'	Report	Kaluyituka 18'; Mputu 22'; Bokese 72'

Somhlolo National Stadium, Lobamba
Attendance: 785
Referee: Janny Sikazwe (Zambia)
15 November 2011
15:30 UTC+1

DR Congo	5–1	Swaziland
Mputu 8', 49'; Kaluyituka 46', 61'; Diba Ilunga 66'	Report	Shongwe 63'

Stade des Martyrs, Kinshasa
Attendance: 24,000
Referee: Jean Michel Moukoko (Congo)

DR Congo won 8–2 on aggregate and advanced to the second round.

11 November 2011
15:00 UTC±0

São Tomé and Príncipe	0–5	Congo
	Report	Moussilou 1'; Douniama 5'; Malonga 27'; Oniangue 54'; Tchilimbou 69'

Estádio Nacional 12 de Julho, São Tomé
Attendance: 3,000
Referee: Sosthene Ngbokaye (Central African Republic)
15 November 2011
15:30 UTC+1

Congo	1–1	São Tomé and Príncipe
N'Ganga 56'	Report	Gando 50'

Stade Municipal, Pointe-Noire
Attendance: 12,000
Referee: Oumar Mahamat Tahir (Chad)

Congo won 6–1 on aggregate and advanced to the second round.

11 November 2011
16:00 UTC+1

Chad	1–2	Tanzania
Labbo 16'	Report	Ngassa 11'; Bakari 80'

Stade Omnisports Idriss Mahamat Ouya, N'Djamena
Attendance: 10,000
Referee: Bunmi Ogunkolade (Nigeria)
15 November 2011
16:00 UTC+3

Tanzania	0–1	Chad
	Report	Labbo 47'

Benjamin Mkapa National Stadium, Dar es Salaam
Attendance: 42,700
Referee: Hamada Nampiandraza (Madagascar)

2–2 on aggregate. Tanzania won on the away goals rule and advanced to the second round.

== Goalscorers ==
There were 66 goals scored in 22 matches, for an average of 3 goals per match.

3 goals

- (Democratic Republic of the Congo) Dioko Kaluyituka
- (Democratic Republic of the Congo) Trésor Mputu
- (Kenya) Dennis Oliech
- (Namibia) Lazarus Kaimbi

2 goals

- (Chad) Mahamat Labbo
- (Ethiopia) Shimelis Bekele
- (Ethiopia) Getaneh Kebede
- (Namibia) Rudolf Bester
- (Namibia) Sydney Urikhob
- (Eswatini) Sidumo Shongwe

1 goal

- (Burundi) Cedric Amissi
- (Burundi) Selemani Ndikumana
- (Comoros) Mohamed Youssouf
- (Republic of the Congo) Ladislas Douniama
- (Republic of the Congo) Chris Malonga
- (Republic of the Congo) Matt Moussilou
- (Republic of the Congo) Francis N'Ganga
- (Republic of the Congo) Prince Oniangue
- (Republic of the Congo) Harris Tchilimbou
- (Democratic Republic of the Congo) Gladys Bokese
- (Democratic Republic of the Congo) Yves Diba Ilunga
- (Equatorial Guinea) Viera Ellong
- (Equatorial Guinea) Juvenal
- (Equatorial Guinea) Randy
- (Eritrea) Abraham Tedros
- (Eritrea) Tesfalem Tekle
- (Ethiopia) Oumed Oukri
- (Guinea-Bissau) Basile de Carvalho
- (Kenya) Brian Onyango
- (Kenya) Titus Mulama
- (Kenya) Pascal Ochieng
- (Kenya) Victor Wanyama
- (Lesotho) Bokang Mothoane
- (Lesotho) Lehlomela Ramabele
- (Lesotho) Thapelo Tale
- (Madagascar) Yvan Rajoarimanana
- (Madagascar) Falimery Ramanamahefa
- (Mozambique) Clésio Baúque
- (Mozambique) Domingues
- (Mozambique) Miro
- (Mozambique) Jerry Sitoe
- (Mozambique) Whiskey
- (Namibia) Heinrich Isaacks
- (Rwanda) Labama Bokota
- (Rwanda) Jean-Claude Iranzi
- (Rwanda) Olivier Karekezi
- (Rwanda) Elias Uzamukunda
- (São Tomé and Príncipe) Orlando Gando
- (Tanzania) Nurdin Bakari
- (Tanzania) Mrisho Ngassa
- (Togo) Serge Gakpé

1 own goal

- (Guinea-Bissau) Jonas Mendes (against Togo)
