= Mudenda =

Mudenda is a surename. It may refer to:

- Elijah Mudenda (1927–2008), Zambian politician. Second Prime Minister of Zambia (1975-1977)
- Jacob Mudenda, Zimbabwean politician, Speaker of the National Assembly of Zimbabwe
- Kennedy Mudenda (born 1988), Zambian footballer
- Mwaka "Mwaksy" Mudenda, presenter of Blue Peter UK TV series
