= Tesfalem Tekle =

Eritrean footballer

Tesfalem Tekle (born 9 October 1993) is an Eritrean footballer. He played for the Eritrea national team in the 2014 FIFA World Cup qualifiers. He is known to be the first Eritrean goal scorer in a FIFA World Cup Qualifiers.

== International career ==
=== International goals ===
Scores and results list Eritrea's goal tally first.

No	Date	Venue	Opponent	Score	Result	Competition
1.	15 November 2011	Cicero Stadium, Asmara, Eritrea	Rwanda	1–0	1–1	2014 FIFA World Cup qualification
