= Randy Mavinga =

French footballer (born 2000)

Personal information
- Full name: Randy Vivien Mavinga
- Date of birth: 1 May 2000 (age 26)
- Place of birth: Trappes, France
- Height: 1.76 m (5 ft 9 in)
- Position: Right-back

Team information
- Current team: Châteaubriant
- Number: 19

Youth career
- FC Solitaires
- FC Les Lilas
- JA Drancy
- RC Lens

Senior career*
Years	Team	Apps	(Gls)
2017–2020	Lens B	17	(1)
2020–2023	Kalamata	49	(0)
2024–	Châteaubriant	32	(2)
- * Club domestic league appearances and goals as of 4 December 2025

Randy Vivien Mavinga (born 1 May 2000) is a French professional footballer who plays as a right-back for Championnat National 1 club Châteaubriant.

== Career ==
In March 2016, Mavinga moved to Ligue 1 side RC Lens from fellow French club JA Drancy. Mavinga joined JA Drancy in the 2013–14 season after signing from FC Les Lilas. He progressed and impressed while being at JA Drancy, impressing now Paris FC U19 coach Flavien Binant at the time. During his time at Lens, Mavinga never managed to breakthrough to the first team, however, he played a healthy portion of games for the reserves 'Lens B', with the majority of appearances being in the 2019–20 season. Despite playing most of his games in the 2019–20 period, Mavinga in fact made his Lens B debut in 2017, playing 35 minutes in a 1–1 draw versus IC Croix. Mavinga didn't feature at all during the 2018–19 season for Lens B, however made his 'breakthrough' season in the 2019–20 campaign, making 16 appearances for the French B side. He featured in games against Reims B and his former club JA Drancy during this period too, where he was seemingly enjoying starting to make strides in his RC Lens career.

On October 5, 2020, Mavinga signed for Greek side Kalamata on a deal that runs until June 2023. He made his debut for the club on 7 November 2021, featuring in a 1–0 away loss to AEK Athens B. Since then, the right-back has made a total of 9 appearances for Kalamata, helping the Greek team maintain a healthy position in the league table.
