= Oumed Oukri =

Ethiopian footballer

Personal information
- Date of birth: 5 October 1990 (age 36)
- Place of birth: Gambela, Ethiopia
- Height: 1.78 m (5 ft 10 in)
- Position: Forward

Team information
- Current team: Hadiya Hossana
- Number: 18

Senior career*
Years	Team	Apps	(Gls)
2008–2012	Defence Force		
2012–2014	Saint George		
2014–2015	Al Ittihad Alexandria	4	(7)
2015–2016	ENPPI	7	(0)
2016–2017	El Entag El Harby	33	(11)
2017–2019	Smouha	61	(6)
2019–2020	Aswan	12	(4)
2021–2022	Hadiya Hossana	28	(7)
2022–	Suwaiq	3	(3)

International career^{‡}
2009–	Ethiopia	47	(11)
- * Club domestic league appearances and goals as of 18 July 2022 ‡ National team caps and goals as of 27 March 2023

Oumed Oukri (Amharic: ዑመድ ዑክሪ; born 5 October 1990), also spelt as Oumed Oukuri or Omod Okwury, is an Ethiopian professional footballer. He plays as a forward for Oman Professional League club Suwaiq.

== Club career ==
Oumed was born in Gambela National Regional state, one of the federal regions of Ethiopia, which is located in the south western part of Ethiopia near to the border of Sudan. Oumed has scored three goals for his club, Defence Force in six Ethiopian premier league games that club played this year 2010 (2003 Ethiopian calendar). He is becoming the rising star in the domestic games. Oumed Oukri has been named the Best Sportsman according to the weekly Capital Ethiopia's Top 30 List for the 2003 Ethiopian Calendar. In the summer of 2012, Oumed was transferred to reigning premier league champions, Saint George. He scored his first official goal, on 17 October 2012, in a penalty-shootout loss against arch-rivals Ethiopian Coffee. His goalscoring attracted attention of some Egyptian clubs, but St. George declined to release him. In spite of all this, he continued to play well and shared the title of league champions with his team in the 2013–14 season. Consequently, the Ethiopian champions allowed him move to a foreign league.

On 21 May 2014, Oumed signed a three-year deal with the Egyptian side Al Ittihad. However, he transferred to ENPPI in 2015, then he played for El Entag El Harby and Smouha SC. On 16 September 2019, Oumed joined Aswan SC.

== International career ==
Oumed made a debut for Ethiopia on 30 November 2009, in a match against Djibouti, and he immediately scored two goals. The final result was 5–0 for Ethiopia. His third goal came in an African cup qualifiers against Guinea, in September 2010.

Oumed also scored two goals against Malawi and Zambia and two goals against Uganda in the 2010 CECAFA Cup tournament, held in Dar es Salaam, Tanzania.

In January 2014, coach Sewnet Bishaw, invited him to be a part of the Ethiopia squad for the 2014 African Nations Championship. The team was eliminated in the group stages after losing to Congo, Libya and Ghana.

== Career statistics ==
Scores and results list Ethiopia's goal tally first, score column indicates score after each Oukri goal.

List of international goals scored by Oumed Oukri
No.	Date	Venue	Opponent	Score	Result	Competition
1	30 November 2009	Nyayo National Stadium, Nairobi, Kenya	Djibouti	4–0	5–0	2009 CECAFA Cup
2	30 November 2009	Nyayo National Stadium, Nairobi, Kenya	Djibouti	5–0	5–0	2009 CECAFA Cup
3	5 September 2010	Addis Ababa Stadium, Addis Ababa, Ethiopia	Guinea	1–0	1–4	2012 Africa Cup of Nations qualification
4	4 December 2010	National Stadium, Dar es Salaam, Tanzania	Malawi	1–1	1–1	2010 CECAFA Cup
5	7 December 2010	National Stadium, Dar es Salaam, Tanzania	Zambia	2–0	2–1	2010 CECAFA Cup
6	12 December 2010	National Stadium, Dar es Salaam, Tanzania	Uganda	1–0	3–4	2010 CECAFA Cup
7	12 December 2010	National Stadium, Dar es Salaam, Tanzania	Uganda	2–1	3–4	2010 CECAFA Cup
8	8 October 2011	Addis Ababa Stadium, Addis Ababa, Ethiopia	Madagascar	1–1	4–2	2012 Africa Cup of Nations qualification
9	16 November 2011	Addis Ababa Stadium, Addis Ababa, Ethiopia	Somalia	1–0	5–0	2014 FIFA World Cup qualification
10	15 October 2014	Stade du 26 Mars, Bamako, Mali	Mali	1–1	3–4	2015 Africa Cup of Nations qualification
11	15 November 2014	Stade Mustapha Tchaker, Blida, Algeria	Algeria	1–0	1–3	2015 Africa Cup of Nations qualification
