= Gladys Bokese =

Congolese footballer

Personal information
- Full name: Gladys Bokese
- Date of birth: 10 September 1981 (age 45)
- Place of birth: Kinshasa, Zaire
- Height: 1.82 m (6 ft 0 in)
- Position: Defender

Team information
- Current team: AC Léopards
- Number: 26

Senior career*
Years	Team	Apps	(Gls)
?–2000	AC Bandal		
2000–2012	Motema Pembe	206	(29)
2012	Étoile du Sahel		
2012–2013	Motema Pembe		
2014–	AC Léopards		

International career
2004–2012	DR Congo	36	(2)
- * Club domestic league appearances and goals

Gladys Bokese (born 10 September 1981) is a Congolese footballer who currently plays for Congo Premier League side Léopards.

== Career ==
Starting his career at Kinshasa club AS Bandal he then joined Kinshasa giants Daring Club Motema Pembe with Mbala Mbuta Biscotte and Ngasanya Ilongo, where he would become a mainstay, winning the Linafoot thrice (2004, 2005, 2008) and the Coupe du Congo twice (2009, 2010) and captaining the team before leaving for Etoile sportive du Sahel from where he was quickly released.

He has also appeared regularly for the Congo DR with whom he reached the quarter-finals of the 2006 Africa Cup of Nations and won the inaugural 2009 African Nations Championship for locally based internationals but was not called for the 2013 Africa Cup of Nations due to lack of match practice.

Initially a striker, he was converted to center back by manager Claude Le Roy who first selected him to the national team in 2004, he has since then stayed in defence.

== International career ==
=== International goals ===
Scores and results list DR Congo's goal tally first.

No	Date	Venue	Opponent	Score	Result	Competition
1.	25 September 2005	Konkola Stadium, Chililabombwe, Zambia	Zambia	1–1	2–2	Friendly
2.	11 November 2011	Somhlolo National Stadium, Lobamba, Swaziland	Swaziland	3–1	3–1	2014 FIFA World Cup qualification
