= Nurdin Bakari =

Tanzanian footballer

Personal information
- Full name: Nurdin Bakari Hamadi
- Date of birth: 20 January 1983 (age 43)
- Place of birth: Arusha, Tanzania
- Height: 1.72 m (5 ft 8 in)
- Position: Defensive midfielder

Senior career*
Years	Team	Apps	(Gls)
2003	Arusha		
2004–2007	Simba		
2007–2013	Young Africans		
2013–2014	Rhino Rangers		
2014–2015	Villa Squad		
2015–2017	Lipuli		

International career
2004–2011	Tanzania	43	(6)
- * Club domestic league appearances and goals

Nurdin Bakari (born 6 July 1988) is a Tanzanian former footballer who played for the Tanzania national football team. He was a squad member for the 2004, 2005, 2008, 2009, 2010 and 2011 CECAFA Cups.

== International career ==
=== International goals ===
Scores and results list Tanzania's goal tally first.

No	Date	Venue	Opponent	Score	Result	Competition
1.	4 December 2005	Amahoro Stadium, Kigali, Rwanda	Eritrea	1–0	1–0	2005 CECAFA Cup
2.	30 November 2010	National Stadium, Dar es Salaam, Tanzania	Somalia	3–0	3–0	2010 CECAFA Cup
3.	4 December 2010	National Stadium, Dar es Salaam, Tanzania	Burundi	1–0	2–0	2010 CECAFA Cup
4.	4 December 2010	National Stadium, Dar es Salaam, Tanzania	Burundi	2–0	2–0	2010 CECAFA Cup
5.	15 November 2011	Stade Nacional, N'Djamena, Chad	Chad	2–1	2–1	2014 FIFA World Cup qualification
6.	6 December 2011	National Stadium, Dar es Salaam, Tanzania	Malawi	1–0	1–0	2011 CECAFA Cup
