= Henry Joseph Shindika =

Tanzanian footballer

Henry Shindika
Personal information
- Full name: Henry Joseph Shindika
- Date of birth: 3 November 1985 (age 40)
- Place of birth: Mwanza, Tanzania
- Height: 1.85 m (6 ft 1 in)
- Position: Midfielder

Team information
- Current team: Mtibwa Sugar

Senior career*
Years	Team	Apps	(Gls)
2006–2008	Simba		
2009–2013	Kongsvinger	91	(3)
2013–2014	Simba		
2014–2020	Mtibwa Sugar		

International career^{‡}
2006–2013	Tanzania	46	(2)
- * Club domestic league appearances and goals as of 30 March 2016 ‡ National team caps and goals as of 30 March 2016

Henry Joseph Shindika (born 3 November 1985 in Mwanza) is a former Tanzanian footballer who last played for Mtibwa Sugar.

== Career ==
Shindika started playing his competitive football at Simba SC in the Tanzanian Premier League. For a long time he has been the captain of the club which has its headquarters along Msimbazi Street, in Dar es Salaam. In February 2009, Shindika signed his first professional contract with Kongsvinger of Norway.

== International career ==
Shindika has also been a member of the Tanzania's national team since 2006. He has played 46 games and scored two goals for Taifa Stars, and in addition has 6 non-FIFA caps.

== Career statistics ==
=== International ===
Tanzania national team
Year	Apps	Goals
2006	5	0
2007	10	0
2008	8	1
2009	10	0
2010	7	1
2011	5	0
2012	0	0
2013	1	0
Total	46	2

Statistics accurate as of match played 7 September 2013

=== International goals ===
#	Date	Venue	Opponent	Score	Result	Competition
1.	20 August 2008	Dar es Salaam, Tanzania	Ghana	1–0	1–1	Friendly
2.	30 November 2010	Benjamin Mkapa National Stadium, Dar es Salaam, Tanzania	Somalia	1–0	3–0	2010 CECAFA Cup
Correct as of 16 February 2013
