= Hadiya Hossana FC =

Association football club in Ethiopia

Hadiya Hossana
- Full name: Hadiya Hossana Football Club
- Nickname: The Tigers
- Founded: 2006; 20 years ago
- Ground: Abiy Hersamo Stadium; Hosaena (Central Ethiopia Regional State), Ethiopia
- Capacity: 5,000
- Manager: Ashenafi Bekele
- League: Ethiopian Premier League
- 2025–26: 12th
Home colours	Away colours	Third colours

Hadiya Hossana Football Club (Amharic: ሀዲያ ሆሳዕና እግር ኳስ ክለብ) is a professional Ethiopian football club based in Hosaena. They currently play in the Ethiopian Premier League, the first division of football in Ethiopia.

== History ==
The club was founded in 2006 (1998 E.C.). Prior to the start of the 2018–19 season the club announced Girma Tadesse, previously the manager of Debub Police, as their new Manager.

In the 2016–17 season, Hadiya Hossana finished second in group B of the Ethiopian Higher League gaining 53 points in the process. This earned them a spot in a playoff game against Mekelle City FC, the runners up in group A of the Higher League, with the winner being the third and final club promoted to the Ethiopian Premier League that season. The playoff game was held at a neutral site in Dire Dawa city and finished 2–1 in favor of Mekelle City meaning Hadiya Hossana would stay in Higher League.

The club had an impressive start to its 2020–21 season, winning its first 4 games of the season.

== Stadium ==
Hadiya Hossana play their home matches at Abiy Hersamo Memorial Stadium.

== Players ==
=== First-team squad ===
As of 6 January 2021

Note: Flags indicate national team as defined under FIFA eligibility rules; some limited exceptions apply. Players may hold more than one non-FIFA nationality.

No.	Pos.	Nation	Player
2	DF	ETH	Suleiman Hamid
3	DF	ETH	Tewodros Bekele
4	DF	ETH	Bereket Woldeyohannes
5	DF	UGA	Isaac Isinde
7	MF	ETH	Dula Mulatu
9	FW	ETH	Haile Eshetu
10	MF	ETH	Amanuel Gobena
11	DF	ETH	Mikael George
12	FW	ETH	Dawa Hottesa
13	MF	ETH	Kalusha Alhassan
14	MF	ETH	Medhane Birhane
15	DF	ETH	Tsegasew Dimamu

No.	Pos.	Nation	Player
16	FW	ETH	Dinkneh Kebede
17	DF	ETH	Henok Arficho (Captain)
18	FW	ETH	Oumed Oukri
19	DF	ETH	Meskelu Letebo
20	FW	CIV	Salifou Fofana
21	MF	ETH	Tesfaye Alebachew
22	FW	GHA	Bismarck Appiah
23	MF	ETH	Addis Hintsa
25	DF	ETH	Tesfaye Bekele
27	FW	ETH	Tezera Abute
56	GK	ETH	Sintayehu Tamirat
77	GK	GHA	Mohammed Muntari

== Club officials ==
=== Coaching staff ===
Manager/Head coach: (Ethiopia) Ashenafi Bekele

Assistant Coach: (Ethiopia) Iyasu Merhatsidk

Team Leader: (Ethiopia) Melkamu Tsegaye

Team Medic: (Ethiopia) Tamre Hundito

Physiotherapist: (Ethiopia) Benyam Tefera

== Former managers ==
- (Ethiopia) Paulos Getachew
- (Ethiopia) Girma Tadesse
