= Heinrich Isaacks =

Namibian footballer

Heini Isaacks
Personal information
- Full name: Heinrich Isaacks
- Date of birth: March 5, 1985 (age 41)
- Place of birth: Namibia
- Positions: Midfielder; forward

Team information
- Current team: Maritzburg United F.C.

Senior career*
Years	Team	Apps	(Gls)
- Civics FC
- SønderjyskE
- Maritzburg United

International career
	Namibia		(3)
- * Club domestic league appearances and goals

Heinrich "Heini" Isaacks (born 5 March 1985) is a Namibian footballer who plays for Maritzburg United in the South African Premier Soccer League as a midfielder and striker. He played for Namibia internationals at the 2014 FIFA World Cup qualifiers.

He previously played for Civics FC and SønderjyskE.

== International career ==
=== International goals ===
Scores and results list Namibia's goal tally first.

No	Date	Venue	Opponent	Score	Result	Competition
1.	23 July 2006	Independence Stadium, Windhoek, Namibia	Malawi	1–1	3–2	2006 COSAFA Cup
2.	6 June 2009	Sam Nujoma Stadium, Windhoek, Namibia	DR Congo	3–0	4–0	Friendly
3.	6 June 2009	Sam Nujoma Stadium, Windhoek, Namibia	DR Congo	4–0	4–0	Friendly
4.	15 November 2011	Sam Nujoma Stadium, Windhoek, Namibia	Djibouti	1–0	4–0	2014 FIFA World Cup qualification
