= Lehlomela Ramabele =

Mosotho footballer (born 1992)

Lehlomela George Ramabele (born 14 April 1992) is a Mosotho footballer who plays for Botswana Defence Force XI as a striker. He played for Lesotho internationals at the 2014 FIFA World Cup qualifiers.

== International career ==
=== International goals ===
Scores and results list Lesotho's goal tally first.

No	Date	Venue	Opponent	Score	Result	Competition
1.	30 August 2011	Molepolole Stadium, Molepolole, Botswana	Botswana	?–?	2–1	Friendly
2.	11 November 2011	Setsoto Stadium, Maseru, Lesotho	Burundi	1–0	1–0	2014 FIFA World Cup qualification
