= Ladislas Douniama =

Congolese footballer

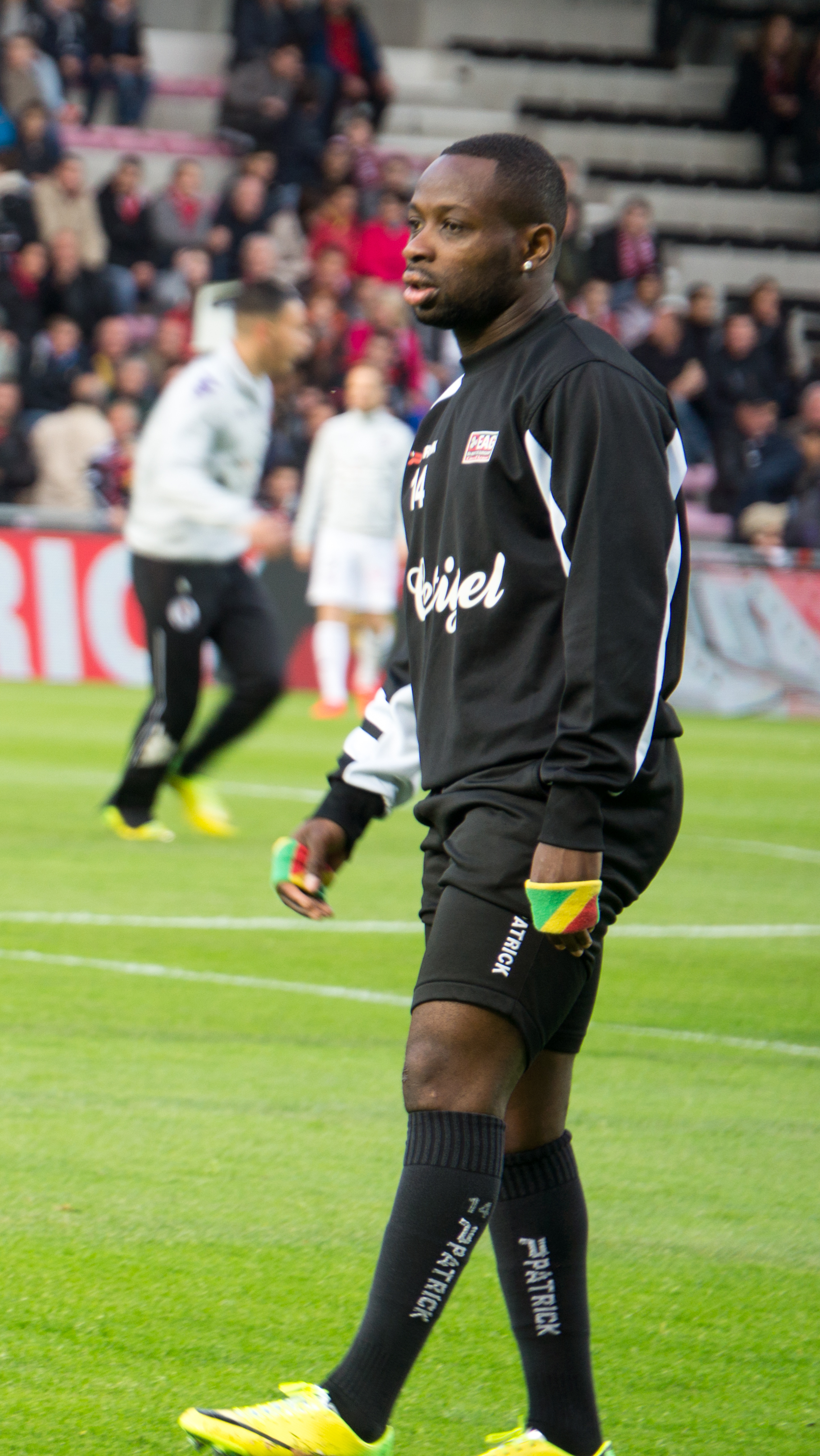
- Douniama with Guingamp in May 2014

Personal information
- Full name: Ladislas Petre Meyair Douniama
- Date of birth: 24 May 1986 (age 40)
- Place of birth: Brazzaville, Congo
- Height: 1.63 m (5 ft 4 in)
- Position: Forward

Team information
- Current team: Rostrenen FC

Youth career
- 1998–2000: Toulouse
- 2000–2002: Montpellier
- 2002–2004: Castelnau Le Crès FC

Senior career*
Years	Team	Apps	(Gls)
2004–2006	Nîmes	27	(5)
2006–2009	Orléans	28	(5)
2009–2010	Lille B	24	(10)
2010–2012	Guingamp	39	(8)
2012–2013	Lorient	6	(0)
2012	→ Arles-Avignon (loan)	16	(2)
2013–2014	Guingamp	42	(8)
2014–2015	Guingamp B	6	(5)
2015–2016	Strasbourg	21	(4)
2016–2017	Al Khaleej	0	(0)
2017	Lyon-Duchère	14	(4)
2017–2018	US Granville	22	(5)
2018–2019	Stade Briochin	20	(10)
2019–2020	Jeanne d'Arc	12	(5)
2020–2021	La Tamponnaise	12	(3)
2021–2022	AS Saint-Louisienne		
2022–	Rostrenen FC		

International career^{‡}
2008–2015	Republic of the Congo	28	(4)
- * Club domestic league appearances and goals as of 9 December 2022 ‡ National team caps and goals as of 9 December 2022

Ladislas Petre Meyair Douniama (born 24 May 1986) is a Congolese professional footballer who plays for Rostrenen FC.

== Club career ==
Douniama was born in Brazzaville, Congo. He made his senior debut for Nîmes Olympique in Championnat National on 18 December 2004, as a late substitute in a 0–0 away draw at Valenciennes. He scored his first senior goal on 18 February 2015, in a 3–1 home win against Evian Thonon Gaillard F.C. After two seasons with the club, he signed for US Orléans, then in Championnat de France Amateur, during the summer of 2006, in order to get more playing time and progress his career.

After three seasons, he joined Lille OSC in the summer of 2009, signing amateur terms to play with the B side still in Championnat de France Amateur, but with the hope that he could progress to the first team. The professional contract did not materialise at Lille, but on 10 June 2010, he signed a two-year professional deal with Championnat National club En Avant de Guingamp.

Douniama made his professional debut for Guingamp as a second-half substitute on 6 August 2010, in a 1–0 victory over FC Rouen. His first professional goal came two months later, on 2 October 2010, when he scored the opener in the 2–1 away win at FC Gueugnon. Guingamp won promotion to Ligue 2 at the end of Douniama's first season at the club, and while in Ligue 2, he was soon spotted by a number of Ligue 1 clubs. On 27 January 2012, he joined FC Lorient of Ligue 1, signing a three-and-a-half-year contract.

Having made only six league appearances in his first season with Lorient, lack of playing time saw Douniama join AC Arles-Avignon in Ligue 2 on loan for the 2012–13 season. The loan was terminated early in January 2013, as Douniama signed a two-and-a-half-year contract to return to Guingamp, where he contributed to the club's promotion to Ligue 1.

During his two years in the top division with Guingamp, Douniama experienced winning the 2014 Coupe de France Final (as an unused substitute) and playing in the 2014–15 UEFA Europa League. At the end of his contract in the summer of 2015, he left Guingamp, and on 10 September 2015, he signed a two-year contract with RC Strasbourg in Championnat National. The club was champion of the division at the end of the 2015–16 season, but Douniama was not in the plans of the coach the following season, and on 22 September 2016, it was reported that he had joined Saudi Arabian side Al Khaleej.

By January 2017, Douniama was back in France, where he signed a contract until the end of the season with Championnat National side AS Lyon-Duchère. At the end of the season, he was released, and in July was part of the UNFP FC team (a team formed of professional players who are out of contract and looking for a club) that faced Ligue 2 side Chamois Niortais F.C. In late September 2017, Douniama signed a contract with Championnat National 2 side US Granville.

On 24 July 2019, Douniama joined SS Jeanne d'Arc.

== International career ==
Douniama made his international debut for the Congo national football team on 8 June 2008 in Republic of the Congo versus Sudan, a qualification match for the 2010 World Cup. His first international goal came in a friendly in Angola on 14 November 2014. He represented the national team at the 2015 Africa Cup of Nations, where his team advanced to the quarterfinals.

=== International goals ===
Scores and results list Congo's goal tally first, score column indicates score after each Douniama goal.

List of international goals scored by Ladislas Douniama
No.	Date	Venue	Cap	Opponent	Score	Result	Competition	Ref.
1	14 November 2009	Estádio da Cidadela, Luanda, Angola	6	Angola	1–1	1–1	Friendly	
2	11 November 2011	Estádio Nacional 12 de Julho, São Tomé, São Tomé and Príncipe	10	São Tomé and Príncipe	1–0	5–0	2014 FIFA World Cup Qualification	
3	14 October 2012	Prince Abdullah bin Jalawi Stadium, Al-Hasa, Saudi Arabia	16	Saudi Arabia	2–0	2–3	Friendly	
4	1 June 2014	Stade Municipal, Pointe-Noire, Republic of the Congo	20	Namibia	3–0	3–0	2015 Africa Cup of Nations qualification	

== Honours ==
Guingamp

- Ligue 2: 2012–13
- Coupe de France: 2013–14

Strasbourg

- Championnat National: 2015–16
