= Ashenafi Bekele =

Ethiopian football team manager

Personal information
- Full name: Ashenafi Bekele Tefera
- Place of birth: Shewa, Ethiopia

Managerial career
- Years: Team
- CBE SA
- Defence Force
- 2012: Dire Dawa City
- –2017: Adama City
- 2017: Ethiopia
- 2018–2019: Ethio Electric
- 2019–2020: Adama City
- 2020–2021: Hadiya Hossana
- 2021–2022: Jimma Aba Jifar
- 2023: Fasil Kenema

Ashenafi Bekele Tefera (Amharic: አሸናፊ በቀለ) is an Ethiopian professional football manager who was most recently the manager of Fasil Kenema.

== History ==
In February 2017, he was appointed as coach of the Ethiopia national football team. Bekele returned to Adama City as manager in July 2019.
