= Francisco Massinga =

Mozambican footballer

Whiskey
Personal information
- Full name: Francisco Massinga
- Date of birth: 6 May 1986 (age 40)
- Place of birth: Mozambique
- Position: Defender

Team information
- Current team: Ferroviário Maputo

Senior career*
| Years | Team | Apps | (Gls) |
| 2006–2007 | Maxaquene | | |
| 2008–2015 | Ferroviário Maputo | | |

International career^{‡}
| 2007–2012 | Mozambique | 28 | (1) |
- * Club domestic league appearances and goals ‡ National team caps and goals as of 28 April 2017

Francisco Massinga (born 6 May 1986), better known as Whiskey, is a Mozambican football defender.

== International career ==
=== International goals ===
Scores and results list Mozambique's goal tally first.

| No | Date | Venue | Opponent | Score | Result | Competition |
|---|---|---|---|---|---|---|
| 1. | 15 November 2011 | Estádio do Zimpeto, Maputo, Mozambique | Comoros | 3–0 | 4–1 | 2014 FIFA World Cup qualification |
