= Falimery Ramanamahefa =

Malagasy footballer

Personal information
- Full name: Falimery Dafé Ramanamahefa
- Date of birth: 22 November 1991 (age 34)
- Place of birth: Madagascar
- Position: Midfielder

Team information
- Current team: Châteaubriant
- Number: 8

Senior career*
Years	Team	Apps	(Gls)
2011–2013	Tana FC Formation		
2013–2015	Lens B	34	(6)
2015–2016	Tourcoing	24	(4)
2016–2019	La Flèche	61	(22)
2019–	Châteaubriant	123	(15)

International career
2011–2017	Madagascar	10	(2)
- * Club domestic league appearances and goals as of 4 December 2025

Falimery Dafé Ramanamahefa (born 22 November 1991) is a Malagasy professional footballer who plays as a midfielder for Championnat National 1 club Châteaubriant and the Madagascar national team.

== International goals ==
Scores and results list Madagascar's goal tally first.

No.	Date	Venue	Opponent	Score	Result	Competition
1.	15 November 2011	Mahamasina Municipal Stadium, Antananarivo, Madagascar	Equatorial Guinea	2–1	2–1	2014 FIFA World Cup qualification
2.	13 October 2015	Mahamasina Municipal Stadium, Antananarivo, Madagascar	Central African Republic	1–1	2–2	2018 FIFA World Cup qualification
