= Mahamat Labbo =

Chadian footballer

Personal information
- Full name: Mahamat Ahmat Labbo
- Date of birth: 21 July 1988 (age 38)
- Place of birth: N'Djamena, Chad
- Height: 1.88 m (6 ft 2 in)
- Positions: Striker; midfielder

Team information
- Current team: FC Portugais de Cholet

Youth career
- Ancienne de Château-Gontier
- Laval

Senior career*
Years	Team	Apps	(Gls)
2007–2011	Laval B	41	(4)
2007–2008	Laval	1	(0)
2011–2013	Bonchamp		
2013–2014	Changé		
2014–2015	Charleroi-Marchienne		
2015–2016	AS Bourny Laval		
2016	Stade Mayennais FC		
2016–2017	Les Herbiers B	6	(1)
2017–	FC Portugais de Cholet		

International career^{‡}
2011–2022	Chad	18	(4)
- * Club domestic league appearances and goals ‡ National team caps and goals as of 15:25, 23 April 2022 (UTC)

Mahamat Ahmat Labbo (Arabic: محمد لابو; born 21 July 1988) is a Chadian professional footballer who plays as striker for French club FC Portugais de Cholet.

== International career ==
Labbo plays for national team of Chad. He debuted for in 2011, in a match against Botswana in N'Djamena. As of April 2022, he has earned 17 caps and scored 4 goals.

== Career statistics ==
=== International ===
Appearances and goals by national team and year
National team	Year	Apps	Goals
Chad	2011	5	3
Chad	2012	2	1
Chad	2013	–	
Chad	2014	2	0
Chad	2015	5	0
Chad	2016	–	
Chad	2017	–	
Chad	2018	–	
Chad	2019	–	
Chad	2020	3	0
Chad	2021	–	
Chad	2022	1	0
Total		18	4

Scores and results list Chad's goal tally first, score column indicates score after each Labbo goal.

List of international goals scored by Mahamat Labbo
No.	Date	Venue	Opponent	Score	Result	Competition
1	8 October 2011	Stade Omnisports Idriss Mahamat Ouya, N'Djamena, Chad	Malawi	1–1	2–2	2012 Africa Cup of Nations qualification
2	11 November 2011	Stade Omnisports Idriss Mahamat Ouya, N'Djamena, Chad	Tanzania	1–1	1–2	2014 FIFA World Cup qualification
3	15 November 2011	Benjamin Mkapa National Stadium, Dar-es-Salaam, Tanzania	Tanzania	1–0	1–0	2014 FIFA World Cup qualification
4	29 February 2012	Stade Omnisports Idriss Mahamat Ouya, N'Djamena, Chad	Malawi	1–0	3–2	2013 Africa Cup of Nations qualification
