= Orlando Gando =

São Toméan footballer

Orgando dos Santos Paquete (born 15 July 1992), better known as Gando is São Toméan footballer who plays for UDRA in São Tomé and Príncipe Championship as a midfielder. He was called to São Tomé and Príncipe national football team at the 2014 FIFA World Cup qualification, where he appeared in two games against the Republic of Congo, scoring one goal.

== International career ==
=== International goals ===
Scores and results list Congo's goal tally first.

No	Date	Venue	Opponent	Score	Result	Competition
1.	15 November 2011	Stade Municipal, Pointe-Noire, Congo	Congo	1–0	1–1	2014 FIFA World Cup qualification
