= Sadney Urikhob =

Namibian footballer

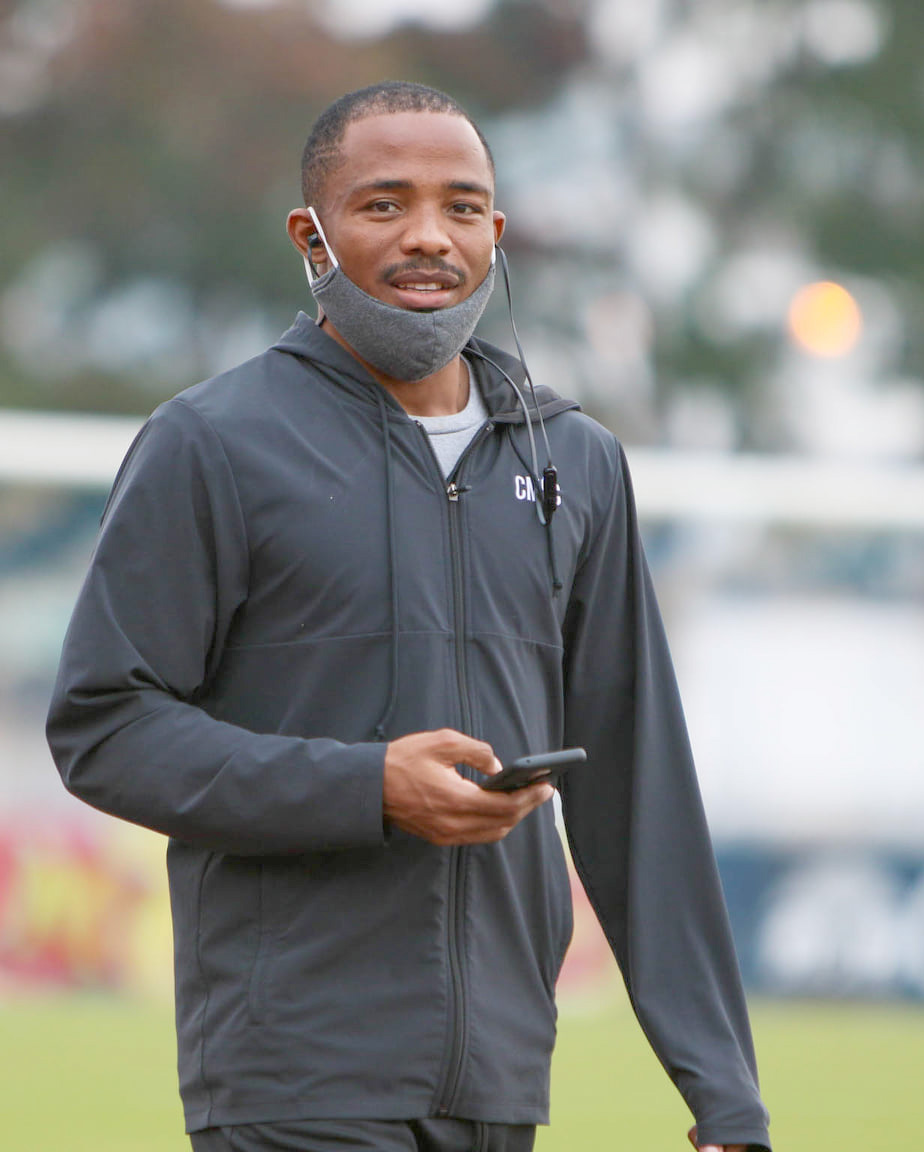
- Chiangmai FC, 2021

Personal information
- Full name: Sadney Urikhob
- Date of birth: 19 January 1992 (age 34)
- Place of birth: Windhoek, Namibia
- Height: 1.81 m (5 ft 11 1/2 in)
- Position: Forward

Senior career*
Years	Team	Apps	(Gls)
2013–2014	AmaZulu	20	(9)
2015	Saraburi	7	(3)
2016–2017	Super Power Samut Prakan	42	(15)
2017	Police Tero	8	(1)
2017–2018	PSMS Medan	11	(1)
2019	Young Africans	0	(0)
2020–2021	Chiangmai	16	(9)
2021	North Bangkok University	9	(4)
2021–2022	Uttaradit	0	(0)
2022	Nakhon Si United	0	(0)

International career^{‡}
2011–2019	Namibia	33	(7)
- * Club domestic league appearances and goals as of 21 November 2021 ‡ National team caps and goals as of 30 May 2019

Sadney Urikhob (born 19 January 1992) is a Namibian footballer who plays as a forward.

== Career ==
=== Police Tero F.C. ===
In July 2017, Urikhob confirmed that he had signed an 18-month contract with a new club Police Tero in the Thai League 1, following his departure from Super Power Samut Prakan.

=== PSMS Medan ===
On 26 December 2017, Urikhob signed a contract with Indonesian Liga 1 club PSMS Medan on a free transfer, along with former Indonesia national team player, Yongki Aribowo.

=== Young Africans S.C. ===
In July 2019, Urikhob joined Tanzanian club Young Africans. On 11 December 2019 it was confirmed that he had left the club. It was later revealed that he left by his own request after the club was struggling to pay salaries.

=== Chiangmai F.C. ===
Left without a club, Urikhob returned to Thailand and joined Chiangmai in February 2020.

=== International goals ===
Scores and results list Namibia's goal tally first.

No	Date	Venue	Opponent	Score	Result	Competition
1.	6 July 2011	Mzuzu Stadium, Mzuzu, Malawi	Malawi	1–0	1–0	Friendly
2.	11 November 2011	El Hadj Hassan Gouled Aptidon Stadium, Djibouti City, Djibouti	Djibouti	4–0	4–0	2014 FIFA World Cup qualification
3.	15 November 2011	Sam Nujoma Stadium, Windhoek, Namibia	Djibouti	4–0	4–0	2014 FIFA World Cup qualification
4.	22 February 2012	Independence Stadium, Windhoek, Namibia	Mozambique	1–0	3–0	Friendly
5.	8 July 2013	Nkoloma Stadium, Lusaka, Zambia	Seychelles	1–1	4–2	2013 COSAFA Cup
6.	21 May 2015	Moruleng Stadium, Saulspoort, South Africa	Zimbabwe	4–1	4–1	2015 COSAFA Cup
7.	30 May 2019	Princess Magogo Stadium, KwaMashu, South Africa	Seychelles	3–0	3–0	2019 COSAFA Cup
