= Zoumana Koné =

Ivorian footballer

Personal information
- Full name: Zoumana Koné
- Date of birth: 27 October 1991 (age 35)
- Place of birth: Abidjan, Ivory Coast
- Height: 1.80 m (5 ft 11 in)
- Position: Forward

Team information
- Current team: Vendée Fontenay

Senior career*
| Years | Team | Apps | (Gls) |
| 2008–2013 | Denguélé | | |
| 2013–2016 | HUSA | 46 | (19) |
| 2015 | → Al Ahli (loan) | | |
| 2016–2017 | Al-Shaab | | |
| 2017 | Al-Orouba | | |
| 2017–2018 | RC Abidjan | | |
| 2019–2020 | Niort | 10 | (0) |
| 2020–2021 | Haguenau | 8 | (1) |
| 2021 | Les Sables-d'Olonne | | |
| 2022– | Vendée Fontenay | 23 | (11) |
- * Club domestic league appearances and goals as of 20:49, 28 December 2022 (UTC)

Zoumana Koné (born 27 October 1991) is an Ivorian footballer who plays as a forward for French club Vendée Fontenay.

== Club career ==
A journeyman striker, Koné was the top scorer in the 2013–14 Botola with 11 goals for HUSA. On 12 February 2019, Koné signed with Niort in the French Ligue 2.
