= Felix Sunzu =

Zambian football striker (born 1985)

Personal information
- Full name: Felix Mumba Sunzu
- Date of birth: 2 May 1985 (age 41)
- Place of birth: Chingola, Zambia
- Height: 1.73 m (5 ft 8 in)
- Position: Forward

Team information
- Current team: Simba

Youth career
- Afrisport F.C
- Konkola Blades

Senior career*
Years	Team	Apps	(Gls)
2007	Konkola Blades	25	(15)
2007–2008	→ Marsa (loan)	16	(2)
2008–2009	→ Châteauroux (loan)	0	(0)
2009	→ Marsa (loan)	2	(0)
2011–	Simba		

International career
2008–	Zambia	14	(8)
- * Club domestic league appearances and goals as of 7 August 2008

Felix Mumba Sunzu (born 2 May 1985, in Chingola) is a Zambian football striker who played for Simba in Tanzania.

== Career ==
Sunzu began his career with Konkola Blades. He played in his first season 25 games scores 15 goals for Konkola Blades and joined than in February 2007 on loan to AS Marsa, he played sixteen games and scores two goals for the Tunisian Ligue Professionnelle 1 club. He joined than in June 2008 back to Konkola Blades and was than loaned out on 2 September 2008 to French Ligue 2 club LB Châteauroux who for one year. He turned than in July 2009 back to AS Marsa who played between 21 October 2009 and was than released from AS Marsa, he played in his second stint only two games in the Tunisian Ligue Professionnelle 1.

On 25 July 2011, Felix Sunzu became one of Simba's most expensive signing this season after completing a 35,000 US dollar (about 50m/-) move from Al-Hilal of Sudan recently. he signed a two-year deal with the former Mainland champions.

== International career ==
Sunzu made his debut on 28 January 2009 in the Africa Cup of Nations (AFCON) against Cameroon national football team in the 2008 Africa Cup Of Nations in Ghana and only has AFCON appearance.

== Background ==
He is the son of Konkola Blades goalkeeping legend Felix Sunzu Sr and is the older brother of Lille defender Stoppila Sunzu and also has a younger brother named Jackson who plays for Konkola Mine Police.

== Personal life ==
Felix is the older brother of Stophira Sunzu and the son of former Konkola Blades Goalkeeper, Felix Sunzu Sr who originates from the Democratic Republic of Congo.
