= Voltigeurs de Châteaubriant =

French football club

Châteaubriant
- Full name: Voltigeurs de Châteaubriant
- Founded: 1907; 119 years ago
- Ground: Stade de la Ville en Bois, Châteaubriant
- Capacity: 3,000
- President: Joseph Viol
- Joint managers: Florian Plantard; Daouda Leye
- League: National 2 Group B
- 2023–24: National 2 Group C, 9th of 14
- Website: www.voltigeurs.fr
Home colours	Away colours

Voltigeurs de Châteaubriant is a French association football club based in the commune of Châteaubriant, Loire-Atlantique. As of the 2020–21 season the men's team competes in the National 2, the fourth tier of French football, having won promotion in the truncated 2019–20 season. The club plays their home matches at the Stade de la Ville en Bois, which has a capacity of 3,000.

== History ==
Voltigeurs de Châteaubriant was founded in 1907, and the football section appeared around 1920. Originally the club also had gymnastics and tennis sections, but these are no longer active.

The football team has played in regional leagues for the vast majority of its existence, with varying levels of success. Châteaubriant won the Division d'Honneur (DH) Ouest in 1958 but declined promotion to the next tier, allowing Stade Brestois 29 to be promoted in their place. This was to be their only league title until 1991, when the club won the DH Atlantique, thereby gaining promotion to Division 4, the equivalent of the current CFA. In 1993, as part of the restructuring of the French league system, the club was moved to the newly formed National 3, the fifth tier of the pyramid. Relegation back to the regional divisions followed in 1997.

The 2013–14 and 2014–15 seasons saw Châteaubriant achieve successive promotions, winning the DH Atlantique and then the CFA2 Group A, to return to the fourth level of French football for the first time in over 20 years. After two seasons, they were relegated to the newly formed Championnat National 3 in 2017.

In the 2019–20 season, Châteaubriant were at the top of Group B of the National 3 table when the season was truncated due to the COVID-19 pandemic. They were declared as promoted to National 2 when the season was officially ended.

In March 2021, the club reached the round of 16 in the Coupe de France for the first time in their history.

== Current squad ==
As of 10 April, 2026

Note: Flags indicate national team as defined under FIFA eligibility rules; some limited exceptions apply. Players may hold more than one non-FIFA nationality.

No.	Pos.	Nation	Player
2	DF	FRA	Ryan Sabry
3	DF	SEN	Cheick Konaté
6	DF	SEN	Ibrahima Leye
7	DF	RWA	Aly-Enzo Hamon
8	MF	FRA	Mathis Oger
10	MF	MAD	Falimery Ramanamahefa
11	FW	SEN	Samba Diop
12	MF	FRA	Enzo Fokam Kamguem
14	MF	SEN	Lemouya Goudiaby
15	MF	SEN	Diabel Ndiaye
16	GK	GUI	Balamine Dramé

No.	Pos.	Nation	Player
18	MF	FRA	Tiago Duarte
19	DF	FRA	Randy Mavinga
20	MF	SEN	Akhibou Ly
21	FW	FRA	Clarence Kegongo
22	MF	FRA	Arnaud Guedj
23	DF	FRA	Eoghan Nolin
24	MF	CIV	Cheick Keita
27	FW	FRA	Namory Keita
28	FW	SEN	Babacar Gueye Sène
29	FW	SEN	Chérif Diallo
30	GK	SEN	Magatte Ndiaye
33	FW	SEN	Abdou Karim DIallo

== Honours ==
As of 2 March 2017.

- Division d'Honneur Ouest: 1957–58
- Division d'Honneur Atlantique: 1990–91, 2003–04, 2013–14
- Championnat de France Amateur 2 Group A: 2014–15
