= Allan Mukuka =

Zambian footballer (born 1987)

Personal information
- Full name: Allan Mukuka
- Date of birth: 5 August 1987 (age 39)
- Place of birth: Mufulira, Zambia
- Position: Midfielder

Team information
- Current team: Green Buffaloes

Senior career*
Years	Team	Apps	(Gls)
2006	Zanaco		
2007	Mufulira Wanderers		
2008	Nkana		
2009–2010	Zanaco		
2011–	Green Buffaloes		
2015–2016	→ AmaZulu		

International career^{‡}
2007–	Zambia	13	(1)
- * Club domestic league appearances and goals as of 7 February 2012 ‡ National team caps and goals as of 7 February 2012

Allan Mukuka (born 5 August 1987) is a Zambian football (soccer) player who plays as a midfielder. He currently plays for the Green Buffaloes in the Zambian Premier League and the Zambia national football team.

== International goals ==
Scores and results list Zambia's goal tally first.

No	Date	Venue	Opponent	Score	Result	Competition
1.	29 March 2015	National Heroes Stadium, Lusaka, Zambia	Rwanda	2–0	2–0	Friendly
