= Tesfaye Alebachew =

Ethiopian international footballer

Tesfaye Alebachew (Amharic: ጠስፋየ ዓለባችሀው, born 27 August 1988) is an Ethiopian international footballer. He currently plays for Hadiya Hossana FC in Ethiopia, as a central midfielder. He was born in Addis Ababa.
