= Abraham Tedros =

Eritrean footballer

Abraham Tedros Abraha (born 20 August 1993) is an Eritrean footballer who plays as a defender. He currently plays for the Eritrea national football team.

== International career ==
Tedros played in the 2009 CECAFA Cup in Kenya, appearing in the opening group match against Zimbabwe.

He also took part in the 2010 CECAFA U-20 Championship in Asmara Eritrea and in World Cup Qualifying in 2011.
