= La Flèche RC =

French football club

Racing Club fléchois
- Short name: La Flèche RC
- Founded: 1995
- Ground: Stade Montréal

Racing Club Flèchois is a French football club based in La Flèche. As of the 2020–21 season, the club plays in Régional 1 Pays de la Loire, following relegation from 2019–20 Championnat National 3. The club also has a women's team which currently play in the Sarthe district league.

== History ==
- 1953 : Fusion of the two football clubs in La Flèche (La Flèche Sportive and AS Bellegarde) to form Union Sportive Fléchoise.
- 1976 : Fusion of two new football clubs in La Flèche (Union Sportive Fléchoise and Sporting Club Fléchois).
- 1995 : Separation of the football club from the rest of the multi-sports club of Union des Sports Fléchois to form Racing Club Fléchois.
- 1996 : First promotion to the Nationale 2, which lasted for one season.
- 2002 : New promotion to CFA, again, for one season.

== Honours ==
- 1986 – 1987 : Champion of DH in the Maine
- 1990 – 1991 : Cup winners in the Maine
- 1995 – 1996 : First in the group for National 3
- 2001 – 2002 : First in the group for CFA 2

== Men's Coupe de France ==
The best result for the club was reaching the last 32 in 1995–1996, when they were beaten by Martigues, in 2001–2002, when they were beaten by Châteauroux, and in 2004–2005, when they were beaten by Libourne-Saint-Seurin.

- 2008 – 2009 : Lost in 5th round to E.S. Bonchamp

== Women's Challenge de France ==
- 2008 – 2009 : Lost in 2nd round to F.A. Laval

== Players ==
=== Current squad ===
As of 22 February 2018

Note: Flags indicate national team as defined under FIFA eligibility rules; some limited exceptions apply. Players may hold more than one non-FIFA nationality.

No.	Pos.	Nation	Player
—	GK	(France) FRA	Quentin Duveau
—	GK	(France) FRA	Corentin Bourdin
—	DF	(France) FRA	Romain Quere
—	DF	(France) FRA	Dylan Reindorf
—	DF	(France) FRA	Martin Guyomard
—	MF	(France) FRA	Thomas Mesnil
—	MF	(Madagascar) MAD	Falimery Dafé
—	MF	(France) FRA	Maxime Brochet
—	MF	(France) FRA	Jordan Allaire
—	MF	(France) FRA	Arthur Guillier

No.	Pos.	Nation	Player
—	MF	(France) FRA	Karyl Courmont
—	MF	(France) FRA	Joseph Ekore
—	MF	(France) FRA	Sami Laridhi
—	FW	(France) FRA	Maxime Ollivier
—	FW	(France) FRA	Didier Bouanga
—	FW	(France) FRA	Medhi Nimzil
—	FW	(Morocco) MAR	Othmane Bennay
—	FW	(France) FRA	Hearvin Djetou
—	FW	(France) FRA	Paul Kouyate
—	FW	(France) FRA	Arnaud Moussion
