= Sidumo Shongwe =

Liswati footballer

Personal information
- Full name: Sidumo Shongwe
- Date of birth: 27 June 1981 (age 45)
- Place of birth: Swaziland

Senior career*
Years	Team	Apps	(Gls)
2010–	Manzini Wanderers		

International career
2011–	Swaziland		
- * Club domestic league appearances and goals

Sidumo Shongwe (born 27 June 1981) is a Liswati former footballer who played for Manzini Wanderers and the Eswatini national team.
