= Kennedy Mudenda =

Zambian footballer (born 1988)

Personal information
- Date of birth: 13 January 1988 (age 38)
- Place of birth: Lusaka, Zambia
- Position: Midfielder

Team information
- Current team: Power Dynamos

Senior career*
Years	Team	Apps	(Gls)
2007–	Power Dynamos	?	(?)

International career^{‡}
2007–	Zambia	17	(1)
- * Club domestic league appearances and goals as of 19:36, 5 December 2010 (UTC) ‡ National team caps and goals as of 19:36, 5 December 2010 (UTC)

Kennedy Mudenda (born 13 January 1988) is a Zambian international footballer who plays as a midfielder for Power Dynamos.

Mudenda has made several appearances for the Zambia national football team, playing for the side that reached the finals of the 2007 COSAFA Cup.
