= 2013 CAF Confederation Cup qualifying rounds =

- Dates: 16 February – 2 June 2013

The qualifying rounds of the 2013 CAF Confederation Cup were played from 16 February to 2 June 2013, to decide the eight football teams that advanced to the group stage.

== Draw ==
The draw for the preliminary, first and second qualifying rounds was held on 9 December 2012, at the CAF Headquarters in Cairo, Egypt, and the fixtures were announced by the CAF on 10 December 2012.

The following 51 teams were entered into the draw:

Byes to first round

- (Algeria) USM Alger
- (Angola) Petro Luanda
- (Democratic Republic of the Congo) DC Motema Pembe
- (Ivory Coast) ASEC Mimosas
- (Egypt) ENPPI
- (Egypt) Ismaily
- (Morocco) FAR Rabat
- (Morocco) Wydad AC
- (Nigeria) Heartland
- (Nigeria) Lobi Stars
- (Sudan) Al-Ahly Shendi
- (Tunisia) CS Sfaxien
- (Tunisia) Étoile du Sahel

Entrants to preliminary round

- (Angola) Recreativo da Caála
- (Benin) Mogas 90
- (Botswana) Gaborone United
- (Burkina Faso) Rail Club du Kadiogo
- (Burundi) LLB Académic
- (Cameroon) Panthère du Ndé
- (Cameroon) Unisport Bafang
- (Central African Republic) Anges de Fatima
- (Chad) Elect-Sport
- (Republic of the Congo) Diables Noirs
- (Democratic Republic of the Congo) CS Don Bosco
- (Equatorial Guinea) The Panthers
- (Ethiopia) Dedebit

- (Gabon) US Bitam
- (The Gambia) Gamtel
- (Ghana) New Edubiase United
- (Guinea) Séquence
- (Ivory Coast) Stella Club d'Adjamé
- (Kenya) Gor Mahia
- (Liberia) Barrack Young Controllers II
- (Libya) Al-Nasr
- (Madagascar) TCO Boeny
- (Mali) Onze Créateurs
- (Mali) US Bougouni
- (Mozambique) Liga Muçulmana
- (Niger) Sahel

- (Rwanda) Police
- (São Tomé and Príncipe) Desportivo de Guadalupe
- (Senegal) HLM
- (Seychelles) Anse Réunion
- (Sierra Leone) Johansen
- (South Africa) SuperSport United
- (South Sudan) El Nasir
- (Sudan) Al-Khartoum
- (Eswatini) Mbabane Highlanders
- (Tanzania) Azam
- (Togo) AS Douanes Lomé
- (Zambia) Power Dynamos

== Format ==
Qualification ties were played on a home-and-away two-legged basis. If the sides were level on aggregate after the second leg, the away goals rule was applied, and if still level, the tie proceeded directly to a penalty shoot-out (no extra time was played).

== Schedule ==
The schedule of each round was as follows.

Round	First leg	Second leg
Preliminary round	15–17 February 2013	1–3 March 2013
First round	15–17 March 2013	5–7 April 2013
Second round	19–21 April 2013	3–5 May 2013
Play-off round	17–19 May 2013	31 May–2 June 2013

== Preliminary round ==
The preliminary round included the 38 teams that did not receive byes to the first round.

Team 1	Agg.	Team 2	1st leg	2nd leg
Gor Mahia (Kenya)	5–0	(Seychelles) Anse Réunion	0–0	5–0
CS Don Bosco (Democratic Republic of the Congo)	3–4	(South Africa) SuperSport United	0–1	3–3
Gaborone United (Botswana)	2–3	(Mozambique) Liga Muçulmana	2–2	0–1
Mogas 90 (Benin)	w/o	(Togo) AS Douanes Lomé	—	—
Rail Club du Kadiogo (Burkina Faso)	2–1	(Niger) Sahel	1–1	1–0
LLB Académic (Burundi)	2–1	(Rwanda) Police	1–0	1–1
Panthère du Ndé (Cameroon)	3–1	(Chad) Elect-Sport	2–0	1–1
Desportivo de Guadalupe (São Tomé and Príncipe)	1–17	(Gabon) US Bitam	0–5	1–12
Anges de Fatima (Central African Republic)	2–5	(Ethiopia) Dedebit	0–4	2–1
TCO Boeny (Madagascar)	3–3 (5–3 p)	(Eswatini) Mbabane Highlanders	1–2	2–1
Gamtel (The Gambia)	5–2	(Senegal) HLM	2–1	3–1
New Edubiase United (Ghana)	1–1 (4–5 p)	(Republic of the Congo) Diables Noirs	1–0	0–1
The Panthers (Equatorial Guinea)	3–0	(Guinea) Séquence	1–0	2–0
Power Dynamos (Zambia)	1–2	(Angola) Recreativo da Caála	1–0	0–2
Unisport Bafang (Cameroon)	0–3	(Mali) US Bougouni	0–1	0–2
Stella Club d'Adjamé (Ivory Coast)	1–4	(Mali) Onze Créateurs	1–1	0–3
Barrack Young Controllers II (Liberia)	1–0	(Sierra Leone) Johansen	1–0	0–0
Azam (Tanzania)	8–1	(South Sudan) El Nasir	3–1	5–0
Al-Nasr (Libya)	1–0	(Sudan) Al-Khartoum	0–0	1–0

16 February 2013
16:00 UTC+3

Gor Mahia (Kenya)	0–0	(Seychelles) Anse Réunion
	Report

Nyayo National Stadium, Nairobi
Referee: Bazezew Belete (Ethiopia)
2 March 2013
17:00 UTC+4

Anse Réunion (Seychelles)	0–5	(Kenya) Gor Mahia
	Report	Kiongera 1', 14'; Wekesa 17'; Lavatsa 60'; Omondi 70'

Stade Linité, Victoria
Referee: Djamal Aden (Djibouti)

Gor Mahia won 5–0 on aggregate and advanced to the first round.

17 February 2013
15:30 UTC+2

CS Don Bosco (Democratic Republic of the Congo)	0–1	(South Africa) SuperSport United
	Report	Nkoana 79'

Stade TP Mazembe, Lubumbashi
Referee: Thierry Nkurunziza (Burundi)
2 March 2013
20:15 UTC+2

SuperSport United (South Africa)	3–3	(Democratic Republic of the Congo) CS Don Bosco
Nyondo 69'; Erasmus 73'; Nxumalo 82'	Report	Semakweri 33'; Ushindi 61'; Kamba 89'

Lucas Masterpieces Moripe Stadium, Pretoria
Referee: Kutlwano Leso (Botswana)

SuperSport United won 4–3 on aggregate and advanced to the first round.

16 February 2013
16:00 UTC+2

Gaborone United (Botswana)	2–2	(Mozambique) Liga Muçulmana
Moatlhaping 67'; Maposa 88'	Report	Sonito 2'; Josemar 68'

University of Botswana Stadium, Gaborone
Referee: Dennis Nguluwe (Malawi)
2 March 2013
15:00 UTC+2

Liga Muçulmana (Mozambique)	1–0	(Botswana) Gaborone United
Reginaldo 1'	Report

Estádio Da Liga Muçulmana, Matola
Referee: Rainhold Shikongo (Namibia)

Liga Muçulmana won 3–2 on aggregate and advanced to the first round.

15–17 February 2013

Mogas 90 (Benin)	Cancelled	(Togo) AS Douanes Lomé
	Report

Referee: Boukari Ouedraogo (Burkina Faso)
1–3 March 2013

AS Douanes Lomé (Togo)	Cancelled	(Benin) Mogas 90
	Report

Referee: Abderahmane Kelly (Mauritania)

AS Douanes Lomé advanced to the first round after Mogas 90 withdrew.

16 February 2013
15:30 UTC±0

Rail Club du Kadiogo (Burkina Faso)	1–1	(Niger) Sahel
Diarra 66'	Report	Garba 9'

Stade du 4-Août, Ouagadougou
Referee: Cecil Fleischer (Ghana)
2 March 2013
16:30 UTC+1

Sahel (Niger)	0–1	(Burkina Faso) Rail Club du Kadiogo
	Report	Yaméogo 78'

Stade Général Seyni Kountché, Niamey
Referee: Edgard Luc Bada (Benin)

Rail Club du Kadiogo won 2–1 on aggregate and advanced to the first round.

17 February 2013
15:30 UTC+2

LLB Académic (Burundi)	1–0	(Rwanda) Police
Ndarusanze 48'	Report

Prince Louis Rwagasore Stadium, Bujumbura
Referee: Hagi Wiish (Somalia)
2 March 2013
14:30 UTC+2

Police (Rwanda)	1–1	(Burundi) LLB Académic
Nshimiyimana 65'	Report	Kayumba 25'

Stade Régional Nyamirambo, Kigali
Referee: Tessema Bamlak (Ethiopia)

LLB Académic won 2–1 on aggregate and advanced to the first round.

16 February 2013
16:00 UTC+1

Panthère du Ndé (Cameroon)	2–0	(Chad) Elect-Sport
Anang 56'; Mboudou 61'	Report

Stade de la Réunification, Douala
Referee: Serge Kongai (Central Africa Republic)
3 March 2013
16:00 UTC+1

Elect-Sport (Chad)	1–1	(Cameroon) Panthère du Ndé
Dingamnodji 35'	Report	Anang 28'

Stade Omnisports Idriss Mahamat Ouya, N'Djamena
Referee: Messie Jessie Nkounkou (Congo)

Panthère du Ndé won 3–1 on aggregate and advanced to the first round.

17 February 2013
15:00 UTC±0

Desportivo de Guadalupe (São Tomé and Príncipe)	0–5	(Gabon) US Bitam
	Report	Yembi 1'; Nzembi 18'; Djissikadié 40'; Afonso 52' (o.g.); Avebe 86'

Estádio Nacional 12 de Julho, São Tomé
Referee: Bienvenu Sinko (Ivory Coast)
2 March 2013
16:00 UTC+1

US Bitam (Gabon)	12–1	(São Tomé and Príncipe) Desportivo de Guadalupe
Guedegbe 5', 11', 25', 38', 72'; Yacouya 35' (pen.); Yembi 55', 57'; Aubyang 65', 90'; Essono 88'; Mvé 90'	Report	Miranda 67'

Stade Gaston Peyrille, Bitam
Referee: Aurélien Juenkou (Cameroon)

US Bitam won 17–1 on aggregate and advanced to the first round.

17 February 2013
15:30 UTC+1

Anges de Fatima (Central African Republic)	0–4	(Ethiopia) Dedebit
	Report	Kebede 32'; Hintsa 47'; Assefa 87'; Fekadu 90'

Barthelemy Boganda Stadium, Bangui
Referee: Raúl Aguiar (São Tomé and Príncipe)
2 March 2013
16:00 UTC+3

Dedebit (Ethiopia)	1–2	(Central African Republic) Anges de Fatima
Hintsa 23'	Report	Hintsa 15' (o.g.); Mamadou 90'

Addis Ababa Stadium, Addis Ababa
Referee: Sebit Rassas Librato (South Sudan)

Dedebit won 5–2 on aggregate and advanced to the first round.

17 February 2013
15:00 UTC+3

TCO Boeny (Madagascar)	1–2	(Eswatini) Mbabane Highlanders
Hajanirina 40'	Report	Mdluli 21'; Ngiumbous 54'

Stade Alexandre Rabemananjara, Mahajanga
Referee: Jean-Claude Labrosse (Seychelles)
2 March 2013
15:00 UTC+2

Mbabane Highlanders (Eswatini)	1–2	(Madagascar) TCO Boeny
Ndzimandze 40'	Report	Hajanirina 23', 47'
Penalties
	3–5

Somhlolo National Stadium, Lobamba
Referee: Wisdom Chewe (Zambia)

3–3 on aggregate. TCO Boeny won the penalty shoot-out and advanced to the first round.

17 February 2013
16:30 UTC±0

Gamtel (The Gambia)	2–1	(Senegal) HLM
Conteh 55', 88'	Report	Fall 71'

Box Bar Stadium, Banjul
Referee: Jimbson Gaima (Sierra Leone)
2 March 2013
16:00 UTC±0

HLM (Senegal)	1–3	(The Gambia) Gamtel
Fall 79'	Report	Sarr 3'; Badji 8', 72'

Stade Demba Diop, Dakar
Referee: Kokou Fagla (Togo)

Gamtel won 5–2 on aggregate and advanced to the first round.

17 February 2013
15:30 UTC±0

New Edubiase United (Ghana)	1–0	(Republic of the Congo) Diables Noirs
Nuhu 10'	Report

Accra Sports Stadium, Accra
Referee: Daouda Guèye (Senegal)
2 March 2013
15:30 UTC+1

Diables Noirs (Republic of the Congo)	1–0	(Ghana) New Edubiase United
Djimbi 77'	Report
Penalties
	5–4

Stade Alphonse Massemba-Débat, Brazzaville
Referee: Hélder Martins de Carvalho (Angola)

1–1 on aggregate. Diables Noirs won the penalty shoot-out and advanced to the first round.

17 February 2013
16:00 UTC+1

The Panthers (Equatorial Guinea)	1–0	(Guinea) Séquence
Bourrema 90+3'	Report

Estadio de Malabo, Malabo
Referee: Mupemba Nkongolo (Congo DR)
3 March 2013
16:00 UTC±0

Séquence (Guinea)	0–2	(Equatorial Guinea) The Panthers
	Report	De la Cruz 45' (pen.); Ferdi 90' (pen.)

Stade du 28 Septembre, Conakry
Referee: Mounir Mabrouk (Morocco)

The Panthers won 3–0 on aggregate and advanced to the first round.

17 February 2013
15:00 UTC+2

Power Dynamos (Zambia)	1–0	(Angola) Recreativo da Caála
Chitalu 70'	Report

Arthur Davies Stadium, Kitwe
Referee: António Anibal (Mozambique)
3 March 2013
15:00 UTC+1

Recreativo da Caála (Angola)	2–0	(Zambia) Power Dynamos
Alioune 9'; Zé Augusto 68'	Report

Estádio dos Kuricutelas, Huambo
Referee: Victor Gomes (South Africa)

Recreativo da Caála won 2–1 on aggregate and advanced to the first round.

17 February 2013
15:00 UTC+1

Unisport Bafang (Cameroon)	0–1	(Mali) US Bougouni
	Report	Koné 89'

Stade Ahmadou Ahidjo, Yaoundé
Referee: Israel Mujuni (Tanzania)
2 March 2013
16:00 UTC±0

US Bougouni (Mali)	2–0	(Cameroon) Unisport Bafang
Doucouré 30'; Camara 42'	Report

Stade Modibo Kéïta, Bamako
Referee: Youssef Essrayri (Tunisia)

US Bougouni won 3–0 on aggregate and advanced to the first round.

16 February 2013
15:30 UTC±0

Stella Club d'Adjamé (Ivory Coast)	1–1	(Mali) Onze Créateurs
Oyetunde 51'	Report	Traoré 70'

Stade Robert Champroux, Abidjan
Referee: Wahid Tamuni (Libya)
3 March 2013
16:30 UTC±0

Onze Créateurs (Mali)	3–0	(Ivory Coast) Stella Club d'Adjamé
Koffi 14'; Sinayoko 37'; Cissé 83'	Report

Stade Modibo Kéïta, Bamako
Referee: Mehdi Abid Charef (Algeria)

Onze Créateurs won 4–1 on aggregate and advanced to the first round.

17 February 2013
16:00 UTC±0

Barrack Young Controllers II (Liberia)	1–0	(Sierra Leone) Johansen
Dauda 88' (pen.)	Report

Antoinette Tubman Stadium, Monrovia
Referee: Mahamadou Keita (Mali)
3 March 2013
15:00 UTC±0

Johansen (Sierra Leone)	0–0	(Liberia) Barrack Young Controllers II
	Report

National Stadium, Freetown
Referee: Gilberto dos Santos (Guinea-Bissau)

Barrack Young Controllers II won 1–0 on aggregate and advanced to the first round.

16 February 2013
16:00 UTC+3

Azam (Tanzania)	3–1	(South Sudan) El Nasir
Kassim 15'; Tchetche 80', 90'	Report	Osulu 39'

Benjamin Mkapa National Stadium, Dar es Salaam
Referee: Davies Omweno (Kenya)
3 March 2013
17:30 UTC+3

El Nasir (South Sudan)	0–5	(Tanzania) Azam
	Report	Mcha 25', 31', 70'; Bocco 49'; Tchetche 60'

Juba Stadium, Juba
Referee: Gervais Munyanziza (Rwanda)

Azam won 8–1 on aggregate and advanced to the first round.

17 February 2013
15:00 UTC+1

Al-Nasr (Libya)	0–0	(Sudan) Al-Khartoum
	Report

Stade Bou Ali-Lahouar, Hammam Sousse (Tunisia)
Referee: Luleseged Ghebremichael (Eritrea)
3 March 2013
16:30 UTC+3

Al-Khartoum (Sudan)	0–1	(Libya) Al-Nasr
	Report	Saad 37'

Khartoum Stadium, Khartoum
Referee: Miro Brian Nsubuga (Uganda)

Note: Al-Nasr played their home match in Tunisia due to security concerns in Libya.
Al-Nasr won 1–0 on aggregate and advanced to the first round.

== First round ==
The first round included 32 teams: the 19 winners of the preliminary round, and the 13 teams that received byes to this round.

Team 1	Agg.	Team 2	1st leg	2nd leg
ENPPI (Egypt)	3–0	(Kenya) Gor Mahia	3–0	0–0
Petro Luanda (Angola)	0–2	(South Africa) SuperSport United	0–0	0–2
Lobi Stars (Nigeria)	4–8	(Mozambique) Liga Muçulmana	3–1	1–7
Wydad AC (Morocco)	4–1	(Togo) AS Douanes Lomé	3–0	1–1
Rail Club du Kadiogo (Burkina Faso)	2–3	(Ivory Coast) ASEC Mimosas	1–2	1–1
DC Motema Pembe (Democratic Republic of the Congo)	1–2	(Burundi) LLB Académic	1–0	0–2
USM Alger (Algeria)	4–2	(Cameroon) Panthère du Ndé	1–0	3–2
Heartland (Nigeria)	w/o	(Gabon) US Bitam	2–1	—
Al-Ahly Shendi (Sudan)	1–0	(Ethiopia) Dedebit	1–0	0–0
Ismaily (Egypt)	4–2	(Madagascar) TCO Boeny	2–0	2–2
CS Sfaxien (Tunisia)	7–3	(The Gambia) Gamtel	4–2	3–1
Diables Noirs (Republic of the Congo)	6–1	(Equatorial Guinea) The Panthers	6–1	0–0
Recreativo da Caála (Angola)	6–0	(Mali) US Bougouni	4–0	2–0
Étoile du Sahel (Tunisia)	5–3	(Mali) Onze Créateurs	2–1	3–2
Barrack Young Controllers II (Liberia)	1–2	(Tanzania) Azam	1–2	0–0
FAR Rabat (Morocco)	2–1	(Libya) Al-Nasr	1–0	1–1

15 March 2013
18:00 UTC+2

ENPPI (Egypt)	3–0	(Kenya) Gor Mahia
Die Foneye 31'; Omran 41'; Raouf 85'	Report

30 June Stadium, Cairo
Referee: Hagi Wiish (Somalia)
6 April 2013
16:00 UTC+3

Gor Mahia (Kenya)	0–0	(Egypt) ENPPI
	Report

Nyayo National Stadium, Nairobi
Referee: Jonas Shongedi (Namibia)

ENPPI won 3–0 on aggregate and advanced to the second round.

17 March 2013
17:00 UTC+1

Petro Luanda (Angola)	0–0	(South Africa) SuperSport United
	Report

Estádio 11 de Novembro, Luanda
Referee: Ruzive Ruzive (Zimbabwe)
6 April 2013
18:00 UTC+2

SuperSport United (South Africa)	2–0	(Angola) Petro Luanda
Zuma 30', 90' (pen.)	Report

Lucas Masterpieces Moripe Stadium, Pretoria
Referee: Nelson Fred (Seychelles)

SuperSport United won 2–0 on aggregate and advanced to the second round.

17 March 2013
16:00 UTC+1

Lobi Stars (Nigeria)	3–1	(Mozambique) Liga Muçulmana
Aigbe 74'; Lawrence 90' (pen.); Stephen 90+3'	Report	Kamwendo 10'

Abubarkar Tafawa Balewa Stadium, Bauchi
Referee: Gustave Tohouegnon (Benin)
5 April 2013
15:00 UTC+2

Liga Muçulmana (Mozambique)	7–1	(Nigeria) Lobi Stars
Sonito 32', 39', 66', 70'; Josemar 45+2' (pen.), 83'; Pelembe 90'	Report	Nwaogu 20'

Estádio Da Liga Muçulmana, Matola
Referee: Parmendra Nunkoo, (Mauritius)

Liga Muçulmana won 8–4 on aggregate and advanced to the second round.

16 March 2013
20:00 UTC±0

Wydad AC (Morocco)	3–0	(Togo) AS Douanes Lomé
Anderson 8', 15' (pen.); Mouithys 60'	Report

Stade Mohamed V, Casablanca
Referee: Mahamadou Keita (Mali)
7 April 2013
15:00 UTC±0

AS Douanes Lomé (Togo)	1–1	(Morocco) Wydad AC
Mounaghi 38'	Report	Anderson 60'

Stade de Kégué, Lomé
Referee: Idriss Biani (Chad)

Wydad AC won 4–1 on aggregate and advanced to the second round.

17 March 2013
15:30 UTC±0

Rail Club du Kadiogo (Burkina Faso)	1–2	(Ivory Coast) ASEC Mimosas
Yaméogo 90'	Report	Zagbayou 27'; Mvondo 90'

Stade Municipal, Ouagadougou
Referee: Mohamed Benouza (Algeria)
6 April 2013
15:30 UTC±0

ASEC Mimosas (Ivory Coast)	1–1	(Burkina Faso) Rail Club du Kadiogo
Boua 38' (pen.)	Report	Diarra 32'

Stade Robert Champroux, Abidjan
Referee: Lazard Tsiba (Congo)

Note: Order of legs reversed after original draw, since two other teams from Côte d'Ivoire were playing CAF Champions League first legs at home on the same weekend.
ASEC Mimosas won 3–2 on aggregate and advanced to the second round.

17 March 2013
15:30 UTC+1

DC Motema Pembe (Democratic Republic of the Congo)	1–0	(Burundi) LLB Académic
Mwanza 86'	Report

Stade des Martyrs, Kinshasa
Referee: Gilberto dos Santos (Guinea-Bissau)
14 April 2013
15:30 UTC+2

LLB Académic (Burundi)	2–0	(Democratic Republic of the Congo) DC Motema Pembe
Ndarusanze 15'; Duhayindavyi 55'	Report

Prince Louis Rwagasore Stadium, Bujumbura
Referee: Denis Batte (Uganda)

Note: Second leg postponed after three players of DC Motema Pembe were killed in a car accident.
LLB Académic won 2–1 on aggregate and advanced to the second round.

17 March 2013
18:00 UTC+1

USM Alger (Algeria)	1–0	(Cameroon) Panthère du Ndé
Ziaya 27'	Report

Stade Omar Hamadi, Algiers
Referee: Nasrallah Jawadi (Tunisia)
6 April 2013
16:00 UTC+1

Panthère du Ndé (Cameroon)	2–3	(Algeria) USM Alger
Fogang 85'; Eya 90+4'	Report	Daham 27'; Feham 67'; Seguer 81'

Stade de la Réunification, Douala
Referee: Kokou Djaoupé (Togo)

USM Alger won 4–2 on aggregate and advanced to the second round.

17 March 2013
16:00 UTC+1

Heartland (Nigeria)	2–1	(Gabon) US Bitam
Osas 22'; Akor 52'	Report	Djissikadié 53'

Dan Anyiam Stadium, Owerri
Referee: Jerry Yekeh (Liberia)
6 April 2013
16:00 UTC+1

US Bitam (Gabon)	Cancelled	(Nigeria) Heartland
	Report

Stade Gaston Peyrille, Bitam
Referee: Diodada Nzibinze (Equatorial Guinea)

US Bitam advanced to the second round after Heartland arrived late for the second leg, as per ruling made by the CAF.

17 March 2013
20:00 UTC+3

Al-Ahly Shendi (Sudan)	1–0	(Ethiopia) Dedebit
El Bashir 80'	Report

Khartoum Stadium, Khartoum
Referee: Farah Aden (Djibouti)
7 April 2013
16:00 UTC+3

Dedebit (Ethiopia)	0–0	(Sudan) Al-Ahly Shendi
	Report

Addis Ababa Stadium, Addis Ababa
Referee: Allister Barra (Seychelles)

Al-Ahly Shendi won 1–0 on aggregate and advanced to the second round.

17 March 2013
18:00 UTC+2

Ismaily (Egypt)	2–0	(Madagascar) TCO Boeny
Khairy 79'; Antwi 81'	Report

Borg El Arab Stadium, Alexandria
Referee: Lwandile Mfiki (South Africa)
7 April 2013
14:00 UTC+3

TCO Boeny (Madagascar)	2–2	(Egypt) Ismaily
Raveloarison 41'; Andrianantenaina 48'	Report	Antwi 67'; Hassan 90'

Stade Alexandre Rabemananjara, Mahajanga
Referee: Antonio Muiachihuissa Caxala (Angola)

Ismaily won 4–2 on aggregate and advanced to the second round.

17 March 2013
16:00 UTC+1

CS Sfaxien (Tunisia)	4–2	(The Gambia) Gamtel
Khenissi 26', 75'; Salhi 71' (pen.); Challouf 77'	Report	Sarr 63', 81' (pen.)

Stade Taïeb Mhiri, Sfax
Referee: Louis Hakizimana (Rwanda)
6 April 2013
16:30 UTC±0

Gamtel (The Gambia)	1–3	(Tunisia) CS Sfaxien
Conteh 30'	Report	Sassi 23'; Moncer 81'; Khenissi 90+4'

Box Bar Stadium, Banjul
Referee: Thomas Nunoo (Ghana)

CS Sfaxien won 7–3 on aggregate and advanced to the second round.

17 March 2013
15:30 UTC+1

Diables Noirs (Republic of the Congo)	6–1	(Equatorial Guinea) The Panthers
Komara 2', 19', 52', 85'; Nkolo 65'; Diafouka 78'	Report	Collazos 30'

Stade Alphonse Massemba-Débat, Brazzaville
Referee: Yves Roponat (Gabon)
7 April 2013
16:00 UTC+1

The Panthers (Equatorial Guinea)	0–0	(Republic of the Congo) Diables Noirs
	Report

Estadio de Malabo, Malabo
Referee: Serge Kongai (Central African Republic)

Diables Noirs won 6–1 on aggregate and advances to the second round.

17 March 2013
15:30 UTC+1

Recreativo da Caála (Angola)	4–0	(Mali) US Bougouni
Vovó 11'; Pilola 15', 58'; Shayi 83'	Report

Estádio dos Kuricutelas, Huambo
Referee: Dennis Nguluwe (Malawi)
6 April 2013
16:00 UTC±0

US Bougouni (Mali)	0–2	(Angola) Recreativo da Caála
	Report	Nuno Rodrigues 53'; Zé Augusto 75'

Stade du 26 Mars, Bamako
Referee: Abdul Karim Kabia (Sierra Leone)

Recreativo da Caála won 6–0 on aggregate and advanced to the second round.

16 March 2013
16:00 UTC+1

Étoile du Sahel (Tunisia)	2–1	(Mali) Onze Créateurs
Sassi 54' (pen.); Bedoui 76'	Report	Sinayoko 35' (pen.)

Stade Olympique de Sousse, Sousse
Referee: Bienvenu Sinko (Ivory Coast)
5 April 2013
16:00 UTC±0

Onze Créateurs (Mali)	2–3	(Tunisia) Étoile du Sahel
Sinayoko 70' (pen.); Kanadjigui 82' (pen.)	Report	Sassi 22', 54' (pen.); Maâzou 90+2' (pen.)

Stade Modibo Kéïta, Bamako
Referee: Mulamba Yamba (Congo DR)

Étoile du Sahel won 5–3 on aggregate and advanced to the second round.

17 March 2013
16:00 UTC±0

Barrack Young Controllers II (Liberia)	1–2	(Tanzania) Azam
Barshall 41'	Report	Mieno 55'; Rahid 89'

Antoinette Tubman Stadium, Monrovia
Referee: Mohamed Farouk Mahmoud (Egypt)
6 April 2013
16:00 UTC+3

Azam (Tanzania)	0–0	(Liberia) Barrack Young Controllers II
	Report

Benjamin Mkapa National Stadium, Dar-es-Salaam
Referee: Ali Adelaide (Comoros)

Azam won 2–1 on aggregate and advanced to the second round.

16 March 2013
18:00 UTC±0

FAR Rabat (Morocco)	1–0	(Libya) Al-Nasr
Jounaid 74'	Report

Prince Moulay Abdellah Stadium, Rabat
Referee: Mal Mohamadou (Cameroon)
5 April 2013
16:30 UTC+2

Al-Nasr (Libya)	1–1	(Morocco) FAR Rabat
Otobong 71'	Report	Kaddioui 77'

Martyrs of February Stadium, Benina
Attendance: 10,500
Referee: Tessema Bamlak (Ethiopia)

FAR Rabat won 2–1 on aggregate and advanced to the second round.

== Second round ==
The second round included the 16 winners of the first round.

Team 1	Agg.	Team 2	1st leg	2nd leg
ENPPI (Egypt)	3–1	(South Africa) SuperSport United	0–0	3–1
Liga Muçulmana (Mozambique)	3–3 (a)	(Morocco) Wydad AC	2–0	1–3
ASEC Mimosas (Ivory Coast)	1–1 (2–4 p)	(Burundi) LLB Académic	1–0	0–1
USM Alger (Algeria)	0–3	(Gabon) US Bitam	0–0	0–3
Al-Ahly Shendi (Sudan)	0–0 (3–4 p)	(Egypt) Ismaily	0–0	0–0
CS Sfaxien (Tunisia)	4–2	(Republic of the Congo) Diables Noirs	3–1	1–1
Recreativo da Caála (Angola)	2–7	(Tunisia) Étoile du Sahel	1–1	1–6
Azam (Tanzania)	1–2	(Morocco) FAR Rabat	0–0	1–2

19 April 2013
19:00 UTC+2

ENPPI (Egypt)	0–0	(South Africa) SuperSport United
	Report

30 June Stadium, Cairo
Referee: Denis Dembélé (Ivory Coast)
4 May 2013
15:00 UTC+2

SuperSport United (South Africa)	1–3	(Egypt) ENPPI
Maluleka 10'	Report	Die Foneye 37', 40'; Omran 54'

Lucas Masterpieces Moripe Stadium, Pretoria
Referee: Hudu Munyanziza (Rwanda)

ENPPI won 3–1 on aggregate and advanced to the play-off round.

21 April 2013
15:00 UTC+2

Liga Muçulmana (Mozambique)	2–0	(Morocco) Wydad AC
Sonito 21'; Miró 90'	Report

Estádio Da Liga Muçulmana, Matola
Referee: Ruzive Ruzive (Zimbabwe)
5 May 2013
20:00 UTC+1

Wydad AC (Morocco)	3–1	(Mozambique) Liga Muçulmana
Sekkat 16'; N'Guessi 45', 66'	Report	Zainadine Júnior 39'

Stade Mohamed V, Casablanca
Referee: Mohamed Benouza (Algeria)

3–3 on aggregate. Liga Muçulmana won on the away goals rule and advanced to the play-off round.

20 April 2013
15:30 UTC±0

ASEC Mimosas (Ivory Coast)	1–0	(Burundi) LLB Académic
Mvondo 45+5'	Report

Stade Robert Champroux, Abidjan
Referee: Ben Hassana (Tunisia)
4 May 2013
15:30 UTC+2

LLB Académic (Burundi)	1–0	(Ivory Coast) ASEC Mimosas
Ndunarugira 38'	Report
Penalties
	4-2

Prince Louis Rwagasore Stadium, Bujumbura
Referee: Mensur Maeruf (Eritrea)

1–1 on aggregate. LLB Académic won the penalty shoot-out and advanced to the play-off round.

19 April 2013
17:00 UTC+1

USM Alger (Algeria)	0–0	(Gabon) US Bitam
	Report

Stade Omar Hamadi, Algiers
Referee: Denis Batte (Uganda)
4 May 2013
16:00 UTC+1

US Bitam (Gabon)	3–0	(Algeria) USM Alger
Djissikadié 46'; Yacouya 58'; Massamba 82'	Report

Stade Gaston Peyrille, Bitam
Referee: Hamada Nampiandraza (Madagascar)

US Bitam won 3–0 on aggregate and advanced to the play-off round.

19 April 2013
20:00 UTC+3

Al-Ahly Shendi (Sudan)	0–0	(Egypt) Ismaily
	Report

Shendi Stadium, Shendi
Referee: Ali Lemghaifry (Mauritania)
3 May 2013
19:00 UTC+2

Ismaily (Egypt)	0–0	(Sudan) Al-Ahly Shendi
	Report
Penalties
	4–3

30 June Stadium, Cairo
Referee: Thierry Nkurunziza (Burundi)

0–0 on aggregate. Ismaily won the penalty shoot-out and advanced to the play-off round.

19 April 2013
16:00 UTC+1

CS Sfaxien (Tunisia)	3–1	(Republic of the Congo) Diables Noirs
Moncer 53'; Kouyaté 69'; Salhi 89' (pen.)	Report	Nkolo 27'

Stade Taïeb Mhiri, Sfax
Referee: Boukari Ouedraogo (Burkina Faso)
5 May 2013
15:30 UTC+1

Diables Noirs (Republic of the Congo)	1–1	(Tunisia) CS Sfaxien
Chamery 38'	Report	Moncer 41'

Stade Alphonse Massemba-Débat, Brazzaville
Referee: Néant Alioum (Cameroon)

CS Sfaxien won 4–2 on aggregate and advanced to the play-off round.

21 April 2013
15:00 UTC+1

Recreativo da Caála (Angola)	1–1	(Tunisia) Étoile du Sahel
Gueye 90+2'	Report	Jaziri 23'

Estádio dos Kuricutelas, Huambo
Referee: Janny Sikazwe (Zambia)
4 May 2013
16:00 UTC+1

Étoile du Sahel (Tunisia)	6–1	(Angola) Recreativo da Caála
Yahia 5'; Felhi 10', 28'; Dramé 61'; Sassi 63'; Okwi 81'	Report	Mangualde 43'

Stade Olympique de Sousse, Sousse
Referee: Mohamed Farouk Mahmoud (Egypt)

Étoile du Sahel won 7–2 on aggregate and advanced to the play-off round.

20 April 2013
16:00 UTC+3

Azam (Tanzania)	0–0	(Morocco) FAR Rabat
	Report

Benjamin Mkapa National Stadium, Dar-es-Salaam
Referee: Nelson Fred (Seychelles)
4 May 2013
17:00 UTC+1

FAR Rabat (Morocco)	2–1	(Tanzania) Azam
Achchakir 13' (pen.); Allaoui 43'	Report	Bocco 7'

Prince Moulay Abdellah Stadium, Rabat
Referee: Mehdi Abid Charef (Algeria)

FAR Rabat won 2–1 on aggregate and advanced to the play-off round.

== Play-off round ==
The play-off round included 16 teams: the eight winners of the Confederation Cup second round and the eight losers of the Champions League second round. The winners of each tie advanced to the group stage.

The draw for the play-off round was held on 7 May 2013, 12:00 UTC+2, at the CAF Headquarters in Cairo, Egypt. The winners of the Confederation Cup second round were drawn against the losers of the Champions League second round, with the former hosting the second leg. Four ties contained a seeded loser of the Champions League second round (Pot A) and an unseeded winner of the Confederation Cup second round (Pot B), and the other four ties contained a seeded winner of the Confederation Cup second round (Pot C) and an unseeded loser of the Champions League second round (Pot D).

The following 16 teams were entered into the draw:

Pot A

- (Democratic Republic of the Congo) TP Mazembe
- (Algeria) ES Sétif
- (Morocco) FUS Rabat
- (Mali) Stade Malien

Pot B

- (Gabon) US Bitam
- (Morocco) FAR Rabat
- (Burundi) LLB Académic
- (Mozambique) Liga Muçulmana

Pot C

- (Tunisia) CS Sfaxien
- (Egypt) ENPPI
- (Egypt) Ismaily
- (Tunisia) Étoile du Sahel

Pot D

- (Algeria) JSM Béjaïa
- (Tunisia) CA Bizertin
- (Nigeria) Enugu Rangers
- (Ethiopia) Saint George

Team 1	Agg.	Team 2	1st leg	2nd leg
Stade Malien (Mali)	6–0	(Burundi) LLB Académic	5–0	1–0
Enugu Rangers (Nigeria)	w/o	(Tunisia) CS Sfaxien	1–0	0–0
FUS Rabat (Morocco)	4–3	(Morocco) FAR Rabat	1–0	3–3
CA Bizertin (Tunisia)	3–1	(Egypt) Ismaily	3–0	0–1
ES Sétif (Algeria)	2–2 (5–3 p)	(Gabon) US Bitam	2–0	0–2
JSM Béjaïa (Algeria)	3–4	(Tunisia) Étoile du Sahel	2–2	1–2
TP Mazembe (Democratic Republic of the Congo)	5–2	(Mozambique) Liga Muçulmana	4–0	1–2
Saint George (Ethiopia)	3–3 (a)	(Egypt) ENPPI	2–0	1–3

18 May 2013
17:00 UTC±0

Stade Malien (Mali)	5–0	(Burundi) LLB Académic
Coulibaly 3', 90+1'; Dembélé 21'; Koïta 40'; Doumbia 90+2'	Report

Stade Modibo Kéïta, Bamako
Referee: William Agbovi (Ghana)
2 June 2013
15:30 UTC±0

LLB Académic (Burundi)	0–1	(Mali) Stade Malien
	Report	Diawara 14'

Prince Louis Rwagasore Stadium, Bujumbura
Referee: Mehdi Abid Charef (Algeria)

Stade Malien won 6–0 on aggregate and advanced to the group stage.

19 May 2013
16:00 UTC+1

Enugu Rangers (Nigeria)	1–0	(Tunisia) CS Sfaxien
Uzochukwu 87'	Report

Nnamdi Azikiwe Stadium, Enugu
Referee: Davies Omweno (Kenya)
2 June 2013
16:30 UTC+1

CS Sfaxien (Tunisia)	0–0 Annulled	(Nigeria) Enugu Rangers
	Report

Stade Taïeb Mhiri, Sfax
Referee: Mensur Maeruf (Eritrea)

CS Sfaxien advanced to the group stage after Enugu Rangers, which had originally won 1–0 on aggregate, was ruled by the CAF to have fielded an ineligible player in the second leg and thus disqualified.

17 May 2013
20:00 UTC+1

FUS Rabat (Morocco)	1–0	(Morocco) FAR Rabat
El Kordy 9' (o.g.)	Report

Prince Moulay Abdellah Stadium, Rabat
Referee: Aurélien Juenkou (Cameroon)
2 June 2013
18:00 UTC+1

FAR Rabat (Morocco)	3–3	(Morocco) FUS Rabat
El Yousfi 33'; Allaoui 59' (pen.); Hammal 90'	Report	Benjelloun 4', 79'; El Araoui 75'

Prince Moulay Abdellah Stadium, Rabat
Referee: Ali Lemghaifry (Mauritania)

FUS Rabat won 4–3 on aggregate and advanced to the group stage.

19 May 2013
16:00 UTC+1

CA Bizertin (Tunisia)	3–0	(Egypt) Ismaily
Zaiem 37'; Machani 61'; Jabeur 90+1'	Report

Stade 15 Octobre, Bizerte
Referee: Mahamadou Keita (Mali)
2 June 2013
20:00 UTC+2

Ismaily (Egypt)	1–0	(Tunisia) CA Bizertin
Khairy 42'	Report

30 June Stadium, Cairo
Referee: Dennis Batte (Uganda)

CA Bizertin won 3–1 on aggregate and advanced to the group stage.

17 May 2013
19:00 UTC+1

ES Sétif (Algeria)	2–0	(Gabon) US Bitam
Ogbi 40'; Aoudia 59'	Report

Stade 8 Mai 1945, Sétif
Referee: Juste Ephrem Zio (Burkina Faso)
1 June 2013
15:00 UTC+1

US Bitam (Gabon)	2–0	(Algeria) ES Sétif
Djissikadié 38'; Zé Ondo 44'	Report
Penalties
	3–5

Stade Gaston Peyrille, Bitam
Referee: Janny Sikazwe (Zambia)

2–2 on aggregate. ES Sétif won the penalty shoot-out and advanced to the group stage.

18 May 2013
19:00 UTC+1

JSM Béjaïa (Algeria)	2–2	(Tunisia) Étoile du Sahel
Derrag 26'; Ferguène 59'	Report	Belaïd 36'; Dramé 86'

Stade de l'Unité Maghrébine, Béjaïa
Referee: Rédouane Jiyed (Morocco)
2 June 2013
17:00 UTC+1

Étoile du Sahel (Tunisia)	2–1	(Algeria) JSM Béjaïa
Sassi 47' (pen.); Asante 77'	Report	Derrag 43'

Stade Olympique de Sousse, Sousse
Referee: Ousmane Fall (Senegal)

Étoile du Sahel won 4–3 on aggregate and advanced to the group stage.

19 May 2013
15:30 UTC+2

TP Mazembe (Democratic Republic of the Congo)	4–0	(Mozambique) Liga Muçulmana
Boateng 16'; Singuluma 35'; Samatta 53'; Sinkala 80' (pen.)	Report

Stade TP Mazembe, Lubumbashi
Referee: Hudu Munyemana (Rwanda)
2 June 2013
15:00 UTC+2

Liga Muçulmana (Mozambique)	2–1	(Democratic Republic of the Congo) TP Mazembe
Ndadzungira 11'; Pelembe 50'	Report	Samatta 45'

Estádio Da Liga Muçulmana, Matola
Referee: Hélder Martins de Carvalho (Angola)

TP Mazembe won 5–2 on aggregate and advanced to the group stage.

19 May 2013
16:00 UTC+3

Saint George (Ethiopia)	2–0	(Egypt) ENPPI
Shimelis 4'; Abebaw 26'	Report

Addis Ababa Stadium, Addis Ababa
Referee: Thierry Nkurunziza (Burundi)
2 June 2013
19:00 UTC+2

ENPPI (Egypt)	3–1	(Ethiopia) Saint George
Die Foneye 25', 84', 87'	Report	Tesfaye 37'

Petro Sport Stadium, Cairo
Referee: Youssef Essrayri (Tunisia)

3–3 on aggregate. Saint George won on the away goals rule and advanced to the group stage.
