= Abdul Sesay =

Abdul Sesay may refer to:

- Abdul Sesay (footballer, born 1991), Sierra Leonean football forward
- Abdul Sesay (footballer, born 2004), Sierra Leonean football forward
