= 2018 FIFA World Cup qualification – CAF first round =

The first round of CAF matches for 2018 FIFA World Cup qualification was played from 7 to 17 October 2015.

== Format ==
A total of 26 teams (teams ranked 28–53 in the CAF entrant list) played home-and-away over two legs. The 13 winners advanced to the second round.

== Seeding ==
The draw for the first round was held as part of the 2018 FIFA World Cup Preliminary Draw on 25 July 2015, starting 18:00 MSK (UTC+3), at the Konstantinovsky Palace in Strelna, Saint Petersburg, Russia.

The seeding was based on the FIFA World Rankings of July 2015 (shown in parentheses). The 26 teams are seeded into two pots:

- Pot 4 contained the teams ranked 1–13 (i.e., 28–40 in the CAF entrant list).
- Pot 5 contained the teams ranked 14–26 (i.e., 41–53 in the CAF entrant list).

Each tie contained a team from Pot 4 and a team from Pot 5, with the team from Pot 4 hosting the second leg.

Note: Bolded teams qualified for the second round.

Pot 4	Pot 5
1. **Niger** (96); 2. **Ethiopia** (101); 3. Malawi (108); 4. Sierra Leone (111); 5. **Namibia** (114); 6. **Kenya** (116); 7. **Botswana** (120); 8. **Madagascar** (122); 9. **Mauritania** (128); 10. **Burundi** (131); 11. Lesotho (131); 12. Guinea-Bissau (133); 13. **Swaziland** (138)	14. **Tanzania** (139); 15. Gambia (143); 16. **Liberia** (161); 17. Central African Republic (170); 18. **Chad** (173); 19. Mauritius (180); 20. Seychelles (186); 21. **Comoros** (187); 22. São Tomé and Príncipe (189); 23. South Sudan (195); 24. Eritrea (204); 25. Somalia (205); 26. Djibouti (207)

== Matches ==
Team 1	Agg.	Team 2	1st leg	2nd leg
Somalia	0–6	Niger	0–2	0–4
South Sudan	1–5	Mauritania	1–1	0–4
Gambia	2–3	Namibia	1–1	1–2
São Tomé and Príncipe	1–3	Ethiopia	1–0	0–3
Chad	2–2 (a)	Sierra Leone	1–0	1–2
Comoros	1–1 (a)	Lesotho	0–0	1–1
Djibouti	1–8	Swaziland	0–6	1–2
Eritrea	1–5	Botswana	0–2	1–3
Seychelles	0–3	Burundi	0–1	0–2
Liberia	4–2	Guinea-Bissau	1–1	3–1
Central African Republic	2–5	Madagascar	0–3	2–2
Mauritius	2–5	Kenya	2–5	0–0
Tanzania	2–1	Malawi	2–0	0–1

9 October 2015
15:30 UTC+3

Somalia	0–2	Niger
	Report (FIFA); Report (CAF)	Maâzou 58', 61' (pen.)

Addis Ababa Stadium, Addis Ababa (Ethiopia) (Note: Somalia played their home leg in Ethiopia due to the Somali Civil War.)
Attendance: 5,000
Referee: Haithem Kossaï (Tunisia)
13 October 2015
16:00 UTC+1

Niger	4–0	Somalia
Cissé 13', 67'; Maâzou 18', 32'	Report (FIFA); Report (CAF)

Stade Général Seyni Kountché, Niamey
Attendance: 7,000
Referee: Falou Galasse Kane (Senegal)

Niger won 6–0 on aggregate and advanced to the second round against Cameroon.

7 October 2015
16:30 UTC+3

South Sudan	1–1 (Note: The South Sudan v Mauritania match was suspended after 10 minutes due to torrential rain, with the score 1–1 at the time. The match was resumed on 8 October 2015, 11:00 UTC+3.)	Mauritania
Abui Pretino 5'	Report (FIFA); Report (CAF)	Bagili 3'

Juba Stadium, Juba
Attendance: 10,000
Referee: Rajab Bakasambe (Uganda)
13 October 2015
17:00 UTC±0

Mauritania	4–0	South Sudan
Ahmed 3'; Bagili 61'; M. Samba 84'; Diakité 90+2'	Report (FIFA); Report (CAF)

Stade Olympique, Nouakchott
Attendance: 9,000
Referee: Fidel Gomes (Guinea-Bissau)

Mauritania won 5–1 on aggregate and advanced to the second round against Tunisia.

9 October 2015
17:00 UTC±0

Gambia	1–1	Namibia
Jammeh 78'	Report (FIFA); Report (CAF)	Stephanus 61'

Independence Stadium, Bakau
Attendance: 12,000
Referee: Ousmane Karembe (Mali)
13 October 2015
16:00 UTC+2

Namibia	2–1	Gambia
Stephanus 42'; Somaeb 64'	Report (FIFA); Report (CAF)	Dibba 9'

Sam Nujoma Stadium, Windhoek
Attendance: 4,000
Referee: Joshua Bondo (Botswana)

Namibia won 3–2 on aggregate and advanced to the second round against Guinea.

8 October 2015
15:00 UTC±0

São Tomé and Príncipe	1–0	Ethiopia
Leal 86'	Report (FIFA); Report (CAF)

Estádio Nacional 12 de Julho, São Tomé
Attendance: 4,550
Referee: Alhadi Mahamat (Chad)
11 October 2015
16:00 UTC+3

Ethiopia	3–0	São Tomé and Príncipe
Fekadu 1'; Panom 47' (pen.); Lok 74'	Report (FIFA); Report (CAF)

Addis Ababa Stadium, Addis Ababa
Attendance: 23,840
Referee: Jean Claude Ishimwe (Rwanda)

Ethiopia won 3–1 on aggregate and advanced to the second round against Congo.

10 October 2015
15:30 UTC+1

Chad	1–0	Sierra Leone
Djimrangar 47'	Report (FIFA); Report (CAF)

Stade Omnisports Idriss Mahamat Ouya, N'Djamena
Attendance: 2,664
Referee: Kokou Fagla (Togo)
13 October 2015
15:00 UTC+1

Sierra Leone	2–1	Chad
Kamara 70'; Sesay 81'	Report (FIFA); Report (CAF)	Djimrangar 45+2'

Adokiye Amiesimaka Stadium, Port Harcourt (Nigeria) (Note: Sierra Leone played their home leg in Nigeria due to the Western African Ebola virus epidemic.)
Attendance: 100
Referee: Aboubacar Bangoura (Guinea)

2–2 on aggregate. Chad won on the away goals rule and advanced to the second round against Egypt.

7 October 2015
15:00 UTC+3

Comoros	0–0	Lesotho
	Report (FIFA); Report (CAF)

Stade de Moroni, Moroni
Attendance: 2,800
Referee: Andofetra Rakotojaona (Madagascar)
13 October 2015
18:00 UTC+2

Lesotho	1–1	Comoros
Seturumane 18'	Report (FIFA); Report (CAF)	M'Changama 70'

Setsoto Stadium, Maseru
Attendance: 480
Referee: Samuel Chirindza (Mozambique)

1–1 on aggregate. Comoros won on the away goals rule and advanced to the second round against Ghana.

9 October 2015
16:00 UTC+3

Djibouti	0–6	Swaziland
	Report (FIFA); Report (CAF)	Mkhontfo 45'; Ndzinisa 61'; S. Dlamini 74'; Hlatjwako 76'; T. Tsabedze 83'; Lukhele 84'

Stade National El-Hadj Hassan Gouled Aptidon, Djibouti
Attendance: 10,050
Referee: Pacifique Ndabihawenimana (Burundi)
17 October 2015 (Note: Swaziland v Djibouti were to originally kick off on 13 October 2015, 19:00 UTC+3, but has been postponed to 17 October 2015, due to the inability of Djibouti's national team to arrive on time for the game.)
16:00 UTC+2

Swaziland	2–1	Djibouti
Hlatjwako 7', 38'	Report (FIFA); Report (CAF)	Liban 21'

Somhlolo National Stadium, Lobamba
Attendance: 2,141
Referee: Ganesh Chutooree (Mauritius)

Swaziland won 8–1 on aggregate and advanced to the second round against Nigeria.

10 October 2015
16:00 UTC+3

Eritrea	0–2	Botswana
	Report (FIFA); Report (CAF)	Moyana 22'; Mogorosi 64'

Cicero Stadium, Asmara
Attendance: 9,950
Referee: Ibrahim Nour El Din (Egypt)
13 October 2015
20:00 UTC+2

Botswana	3–1	Eritrea
Ngele 15', 79'; Mogorosi 21'	Report (FIFA); Report (CAF)	Goitom 9'

Francistown Stadium, Francistown
Attendance: 15,073
Referee: Nelson Fred (Seychelles)

Botswana won 5–1 on aggregate and advanced to the second round against Mali. (Note: After the Eritrea-Botswana match, ten Eritrea players refused to return home and sought asylum in Botswana.)

7 October 2015
16:30 UTC+4

Seychelles	0–1	Burundi
	Report (FIFA); Report (CAF)	Abdul Razak 15'

People's Stadium, Roche Caiman
Attendance: 2,000
Referee: Lemma Nigussie (Ethiopia)
13 October 2015
15:00 UTC+2

Burundi	2–0	Seychelles
Abdul Razak 71' (pen.), 81'	Report (FIFA); Report (CAF)

Prince Louis Rwagasore Stadium, Bujumbura
Attendance: 6,095
Referee: Hafiz Abdelghani Alamen (Sudan)

Burundi won 3–0 on aggregate and advanced to the second round against DR Congo.

8 October 2015
16:00 UTC±0

Liberia	1–1	Guinea-Bissau
Jebor 35' (pen.)	Report (FIFA); Report (CAF)	Baldé 62'

Antoinette Tubman Stadium, Monrovia
Attendance: 10,100
Referee: Fabrício Duarte (Cape Verde)
13 October 2015
16:00 UTC±0

Guinea-Bissau	1–3	Liberia
Cassamá 45+2'	Report (FIFA); Report (CAF)	Jebor 9', 12', 90+5'

Estádio 24 de Setembro, Bissau
Attendance: 12,000
Referee: Ferdinand Udoh (Nigeria)

Liberia won 4–2 on aggregate and advanced to the second round against Ivory Coast.

10 October 2015
14:30 UTC+3

Central African Republic	0–3	Madagascar
	Report (FIFA); Report (CAF)	Rabeson 26'; Rakotoharimalala 39'; Paul 66'

Mahamasina Municipal Stadium, Antananarivo (Madagascar) (Note: The Central African Republic played their home leg in Madagascar due to the Central African Republic Civil War.)
Attendance: 20,000
Referee: Jean-Jacques Ndala (DR Congo)
13 October 2015
14:30 UTC+3

Madagascar	2–2	Central African Republic
Ramanamahefa 18'; Andrianantenaina 37'	Report (FIFA); Report (CAF)	Dagoulou 7'; Malick 45+1'

Mahamasina Municipal Stadium, Antananarivo
Attendance: 20,000
Referee: Daniel Bennett (South Africa)

Madagascar won 5–2 on aggregate and advanced to the second round against Senegal.

7 October 2015
18:30 UTC+4

Mauritius	2–5	Kenya
Sophie 67' (pen.); Bru 78'	Report (FIFA); Report (CAF)	Omolo 19', 82'; Masika 23'; Shakava 49'; Olunga 87'

Anjalay Stadium, Belle Vue Harel
Attendance: 2,300
Referee: Duncan Lengani (Malawi)
11 October 2015
16:00 UTC+3

Kenya	0–0	Mauritius
	Report (FIFA); Report (CAF)

Moi International Sports Centre, Nairobi
Attendance: 10,000
Referee: Mandeng Cosmas (Cameroon)

Kenya won 5–2 on aggregate and advanced to the second round against Cape Verde.

7 October 2015
16:00 UTC+3

Tanzania	2–0	Malawi
Samatta 19'; Ulimwengu 23'	Report (FIFA); Report (CAF)

Benjamin Mkapa National Stadium, Dar es Salaam
Attendance: 11,474
Referee: Hagi Wiish (Somalia)
11 October 2015
14:00 UTC+2

Malawi	1–0	Tanzania
Banda 42'	Report (FIFA); Report (CAF)

Kamuzu Stadium, Blantyre
Attendance: 7,656
Referee: Hélder Martins de Carvalho (Angola)

Tanzania won 2–1 on aggregate and advanced to the second round against Algeria.

== Goalscorers ==
There were 68 goals scored in 26 matches, for an average of 2.62 goals per match.

4 goals

- (Liberia) William Jebor
- (Niger) Moussa Maâzou

3 goals

- (Burundi) Fiston Abdul Razak
- (Eswatini) Sandile Hlatjwako

2 goals

- (Botswana) Joel Mogorosi
- (Botswana) Mogakolodi Ngele
- (Chad) Léger Djimrangar
- (Kenya) Johanna Omolo
- (Mauritania) Boubacar Bagili
- (Namibia) Willy Stephanus
- (Niger) Mahamane Cissé

1 goal

- (Botswana) Galabgwe Moyana
- (Central African Republic) Eudes Dagoulou
- (Central African Republic) Demba Malick
- (Comoros) Mohamed M'Changama
- (Djibouti) Mohamed Liban
- (Eritrea) Henok Goitom
- (Ethiopia) Dawit Fekadu
- (Ethiopia) Ramkel Lok
- (Ethiopia) Gatoch Panom
- (The Gambia) Pa Dibba
- (The Gambia) Abdou Jammeh
- (Guinea-Bissau) Amido Baldé
- (Guinea-Bissau) Ibraime Cassamá
- (Kenya) Ayub Masika
- (Kenya) Michael Olunga
- (Kenya) Haron Shakava
- (Lesotho) Tsepo Seturumane
- (Madagascar) Abel Andrianantenaina
- (Madagascar) Johann Paul
- (Madagascar) Michael Rabeson
- (Madagascar) Njiva Rakotoharimalala
- (Madagascar) Falimery Ramanamahefa
- (Malawi) John Banda
- (Mauritania) Cheikh Moulaye Ahmed
- (Mauritania) Ismaël Diakité
- (Mauritania) Moussa Samba
- (Mauritius) Jonathan Bru
- (Mauritius) Andy Sophie
- (Namibia) Hendrik Somaeb
- (São Tomé and Príncipe) Luís Leal
- (Sierra Leone) Alhaji Kamara
- (Sierra Leone) Abdul Sesay
- (South Sudan) Dominic Abui Pretino
- (Eswatini) Saneliso Dlamini
- (Eswatini) Mxolisi Lukhele
- (Eswatini) Mthunzi Mkhontfo
- (Eswatini) Sabelo Ndzinisa
- (Eswatini) Tony Tsabedze
- (Tanzania) Mbwana Samatta
- (Tanzania) Thomas Ulimwengu
