= Mohamed M'Changama =

Footballer (born 1987)

Personal information
- Date of birth: 9 June 1987 (age 39)
- Place of birth: Marseille, France
- Height: 1.84 m (6 ft 0 in)
- Position: Forward

Youth career
- 2007–2009: Aubagne
- 2009–2010: Gardanne

Senior career*
Years	Team	Apps	(Gls)
2010–2011	Nîmes	24	(5)
2011–2013	Amiens	15	(0)
2012–2013	Amiens B	7	(2)
2013–2014	GS Consolat	28	(13)
2014	Vendée Poiré-sur-Vie	10	(3)
2014–2015	GS Consolat	17	(1)
2015–2016	Les Herbiers	12	(1)
2017	US Zilimadjou		
2017–2018	Annecy	15	(4)
2019	Athlético Marseille	9	(1)
2019–2020	Istres	10	(1)
2020–2021	Racing Besançon	6	(1)
2021–2022	FC Nouadhibou		
2022–2023	US Changé	18	(5)

International career
2010–2021	Comoros	20	(2)
- * Club domestic league appearances and goals

Mohamed "Momo" M'Changama (born 9 June 1987) is a former professional footballer who played as a forward. Born in France, he played for the Comoros national team. Previously, he has played with amateur clubs Aubagne and Gardanne and professional club Nîmes.

== Club career ==
=== Early career ===
M'Changama was born in the city of Marseille to Comorian parents and developed an interest in football at a young age alongside his younger brother Youssouf. The elder M'Changama struggled to make the grade among clubs situated around the south of France and, ultimately, considered giving the sport up. On the other hand, M'Changama's younger brother Youssouf drew interest from several professional clubs and eventually signed a youth contract with Sedan. He later joined Troyes. With M'Changama's impending future looking bleak, he decided to focus more on his studies.

In 2007, M'Changama returned to football joining amateur club Aubagne FC, who were playing in the Division d'Honneur, the sixth level of French football. He spent two seasons at the club and, in 2009, after displaying positive form with the club, secured a move to nearby club Gardanne in the Championnat de France amateur 2. M'Changama played on the club's senior team for the 2009–10 season helping Gardanne finish in a respectable 7th place in its group.

=== Nîmes ===
In 2010, M'Changama signed an amateur contract with professional club Nîmes Olympique. He was immediately inserted onto the club's reserve team. In September 2010, he was called up to the senior team by manager Jean-Michel Cavalli. M'Changama made his professional debut on 1 October in a league match against Le Mans appearing as a substitute in a 2–1 defeat. He made his first start a fortnight later in a 0–0 draw with Istres. M'Changama was praised for his contribution in the match against Istres by Cavalli and, subsequently, began training with the senior team on a regular basis. On 19 October, he scored his first professional goal in a 3–1 loss against Évian.

On 11 November, M'Changama scored the game-winning goal against his brother's club Troyes in a 1–0 victory. The goal was notable due in part to the fact that M'Changama was not scheduled to appear in the match. In the week leading up to the match, he was not named to the 16-man squad to appear in the match and was, subsequently, told that he would play in the reserves for the week. On the day of the match, M'Changama performed routine day-to-day activities. While shopping at the mall, he was informed by one of the assistant coaches by phone that he would be needed for the Troyes match due to backup striker Madimoussa Traoré developing an illness during warm-ups. M'Changama appeared on the bench in the match and, later, appeared as a substitute scoring the game-winning goal in the 76th minute.

=== Later career ===
M'Changama joined Athlético Marseille in January 2019.

== International career ==
M'Changama made his debut for the Comoros national team on 9 October 2010 in a match against Mozambique.

== Career statistics ==
Scores and results list Comoros' goal tally first, score column indicates score after each M'Changama goal.

List of international goals scored by Mohamed M'Changama
No.	Date	Venue	Opponent	Score	Result	Competition
1	13 October 2015	Setsoto Stadium, Maseru, Lesotho	Lesotho	1–1	1–1	2018 FIFA World Cup qualification
2	27 May 2018	Old Peter Mokaba Stadium, Polokwane, South Africa	Seychelles	1–0	1–1	2018 COSAFA Cup
