= Michael Rabeson =

Malagasy footballer

Personal information
- Full name: Fetraniaina Michael Rabeson
- Date of birth: October 26, 1987 (age 39)
- Place of birth: Madagascar
- Position: Midfielder

Team information
- Current team: CNaPS Sport

Senior career*
Years	Team	Apps	(Gls)
2015–	CNaPS Sport		

International career^{‡}
2015	Madagascar	2	(1)
- * Club domestic league appearances and goals as of 19:27, 14 October 2015 (UTC) ‡ National team caps and goals as of 19:27, 14 October 2015 (UTC)

Michael Rabeson (born 26 October 1987) is a Malagasy footballer who played as a midfielder for CNaPS Sport.

== International career ==
=== International goals ===
Scores and results list Madagascar's goal tally first.

No	Date	Venue	Opponent	Score	Result	Competition
1.	10 October 2015	Mahamasina Municipal Stadium, Antananarivo, Madagascar	Central African Republic	1–0	3–0	2018 FIFA World Cup qualification

== Honours ==
CNaPS Sport

Winner

- THB Champions League (3): 2010, 2013, 2014

Runner-up

- THB Champions League: 2011
