= Ramkel Lok =

Ethiopian footballer

Personal information
- Date of birth: 8 October 1994 (age 32)
- Place of birth: Gambela Region, Ethiopia
- Position: Forward

Team information
- Current team: El merriekh F.C. Bentiu south sudan
- Number: 42

International career^{‡}
Years	Team	Apps	(Gls)
2014–	Ethiopia	22	(1)
- ‡ National team caps and goals as of 8 February 2017

Ramkel Lok is an Ethiopian professional footballer who plays as a forward for Welwalo Adigrat University F.C.

== International career ==
In August 2014, coach Mariano Barreto, invited him to be a part of the Ethiopia squad for the 2015 Africa Cup of Nations qualification.

=== International goals ===
Scores and results list Ethiopia's goal tally first.

No	Date	Venue	Opponent	Score	Result	Competition
1.	11 October 2015	Addis Ababa Stadium, Addis Ababa, Ethiopia	São Tomé and Príncipe	3–0	3–0	2018 FIFA World Cup qualification
