= Oumar N'Diaye (footballer, born 1985) =

Footballer (born 1985)

Personal information
- Date of birth: 22 July 1985 (age 41)
- Place of birth: Mantes-la-Jolie, France
- Height: 1.86 m (6 ft 1 in)
- Position: Centre-back

Senior career*
Years	Team	Apps	(Gls)
2003–2005	CA Lisieux		
2005–2006	USON Mondeville	32	(0)
2006–2010	Caen B		
2007–2008	Caen	5	(0)
2008–2009	→ Vannes (loan)	19	(1)
2010–2011	UJA Alfortville	14	(0)
2011–2013	Vannes	41	(4)
2013–2016	Mantes	59	(1)

International career
2013–2016	Mauritania	21	(1)
- * Club domestic league appearances and goals

Oumar N'Diaye (born 22 July 1985) is a former professional footballer who played as a centre-back. Born in France, he made 21 appearances for the Mauritania national team at international level, scoring 1 goal.

== Career statistics ==
=== International ===
Appearances and goals by national team and year
National team	Year	Apps	Goals
Mauritania	2013	3	0
Mauritania	2014	7	0
Mauritania	2015	7	1
Mauritania	2016	4	0
Total		21	1

Scores and results list Mauritania's goal tally first, score column indicates score after each N'Diaye goal.

List of international goals scored by Omar N'Diaye
No.	Date	Venue	Opponent	Score	Result	Competition
1	13 November 2015	Stade Olympique, Nouakchott, Mauritania	Tunisia	1–0	1–2	2018 FIFA World Cup qualification

== Honours ==
Vannes

- Coupe de la Ligue: runner-up 2008–09
