= Mxolisi Lukhele =

Liswati footballer

Personal information
- Full name: Mxolisi Lukhele
- Date of birth: March 4, 1991 (age 35)
- Place of birth: Swaziland
- Position: Midfielder

Team information
- Current team: Royal Leopards F.C.

Senior career*
Years	Team	Apps	(Gls)
2011–2014	Moneni Pirates F.C.		
2014–	Royal Leopards F.C.		

International career^{‡}
2015–	Eswatini	29	(1)
- * Club domestic league appearances and goals as of 4 July 2016 ‡ National team caps and goals as of 4 July 2016

Mxolisi Lukhele (born 4 March 1991) is a Liswati footballer who plays for Royal Leopards F.C. in the Swazi Premier League.

== International career ==
=== International goals ===
Scores and results list eSwatini's goal tally first.

No	Date	Venue	Opponent	Score	Result	Competition
1.	9 October 2015	El Hadj Hassan Gouled Aptidon Stadium, Djibouti City, Djibouti	Djibouti	2–0	6–0	2018 FIFA World Cup qualification
