= 2018 FIFA World Cup qualification – CAF second round =

The second round of CAF matches for 2018 FIFA World Cup qualification was played from 11 to 17 November 2015.

== Format ==
A total of 40 teams (teams ranked 1–27 in the CAF entrant list and 13 first round winners) played home-and-away over two legs. The 20 winners advanced to the third round.

== Seeding ==
The draw for the second round was held as part of the 2018 FIFA World Cup Preliminary Draw on 25 July 2015, starting 18:00 MSK (UTC+3), at the Konstantinovsky Palace in Strelna, Saint Petersburg, Russia.

The seeding was based on the FIFA World Rankings of July 2015 (shown in parentheses). The 27 direct qualifiers are seeded into three pots:

- Pot 1 contained the teams ranked 1–13.
- Pot 2 contained the teams ranked 14–20.
- Pot 3 contained the teams ranked 21–27.

Each tie contained a team from Pot 1 and a first round winner (first 13 ties) which were automatically allocated into each tie (winner of first round tie 1 into second round tie 1, etc.), or a team from Pot 2 and a team from Pot 3 (last seven ties), with the team from Pot 1 or Pot 2 hosting the second leg. As the draw was held before the first round was played, the identities of the first round winners were not known at the time of the draw.

Note: Bolded teams qualified for the third round.

Pot 1	First round winners
1. **Algeria** (19); 2. **Ivory Coast** (21); 3. **Ghana** (25); 4. **Tunisia** (32); 5. **Senegal** (39); 6. **Cameroon** (42); 7. **Congo** (47); 8. **Cape Verde** (52); 9. **Egypt** (55); 10. **Nigeria** (57); 11. **Guinea** (58); 12. **DR Congo** (60); 13. **Mali** (61)	28. Niger (96); 29. Ethiopia (101); 30. Namibia (114); 31. Kenya (116); 32. Botswana (120); 33. Madagascar (122); 34. Mauritania (128); 35. Burundi (131); 36. Swaziland (138); 37. Tanzania (139); 38. Liberia (161); 39. Chad (173); 40. Comoros (187)
Pot 2	Pot 3
14. Equatorial Guinea (63); 15. **Gabon** (65); 16. **South Africa** (70); 17. **Zambia** (71); 18. **Burkina Faso** (72); 19. **Uganda** (73); 20. Rwanda (78)	21. Togo (83); 22. **Morocco** (84); 23. Sudan (90); 24. Angola (92); 25. Mozambique (95); 26. Benin (96); 27. **Libya** (96)

== Matches ==
Team 1	Agg.	Team 2	1st leg	2nd leg
Niger	0–3	Cameroon	0–3	0–0
Mauritania	2–4	Tunisia	1–2	1–2
Namibia	0–3	Guinea	0–1	0–2
Ethiopia	4–6	Congo	3–4	1–2
Chad	1–4	Egypt	1–0	0–4
Comoros	0–2	Ghana	0–0	0–2
Swaziland	0–2	Nigeria	0–0	0–2
Botswana	2–3	Mali	2–1	0–2
Burundi	2–6	DR Congo	2–3	0–3 (Note: FIFA awarded Congo DR a 3–0 win as a result of Burundi fielding the ineligible player Gaël Bigirimana. The match originally ended 2–2.)
Liberia	0–4	Ivory Coast	0–1	0–3
Madagascar	2–5	Senegal	2–2	0–3
Kenya	1–2	Cape Verde	1–0	0–2
Tanzania	2–9	Algeria	2–2	0–7
Sudan	0–3	Zambia	0–1	0–2
Libya	4–1	Rwanda	1–0	3–1
Morocco	2–1	Equatorial Guinea	2–0	0–1
Mozambique	1–1 (3–4 p)	Gabon	1–0	0–1 (a.e.t.)
Benin	2–3	Burkina Faso	2–1	0–2
Togo	0–4	Uganda	0–1	0–3
Angola	1–4	South Africa	1–3	0–1

13 November 2015
16:00 UTC+1

Niger	0–3	Cameroon
	Report (FIFA); Report (CAF)	Mbia 36'; Aboubakar 39'; Salli 40'

Stade Général Seyni Kountché, Niamey
Attendance: 20,000
Referee: Noureddine El Jaafari (Morocco)
17 November 2015
15:00 UTC+1

Cameroon	0–0	Niger
	Report (FIFA); Report (CAF)

Ahmadou Ahidjo Stadium, Yaoundé
Attendance: 5,000
Referee: Gehad Grisha (Egypt)

Cameroon won 3–0 on aggregate and advanced to the third round.

13 November 2015
17:00 UTC±0

Mauritania	1–2	Tunisia
N'Diaye 22'	Report (FIFA); Report (CAF)	Khazri 62'; Chikhaoui 68'

Stade Olympique, Nouakchott
Attendance: 9,000
Referee: Eric Otogo-Castane (Gabon)
17 November 2015
18:00 UTC+1

Tunisia	2–1	Mauritania
Ben Youssef 51'; Bguir 84'	Report (FIFA); Report (CAF)	Cheikh Moulaye Ahmed 71'

Stade Olympique de Radès, Tunis
Attendance: 3,000
Referee: Denis Batte (Uganda)

Tunisia won 4–2 on aggregate and advanced to the third round.

12 November 2015
16:00 UTC+2

Namibia	0–1	Guinea
	Report (FIFA); Report (CAF)	Keïta 27'

Sam Nujoma Stadium, Windhoek
Attendance: 2,000
Referee: Rédouane Jiyed (Morocco)
15 November 2015
19:00 UTC±0

Guinea	2–0	Namibia
Id. Sylla 43'; Keïta 79'	Report (FIFA); Report (CAF)

Stade Mohamed V, Casablanca (Morocco) (Note: Guinea played their home leg in Morocco due to the Ebola virus epidemic in West Africa.)
Attendance: 1,000
Referee: Bienvenu Sinko (Ivory Coast)

Guinea won 3–0 on aggregate and advanced to the third round.

14 November 2015
16:00 UTC+3

Ethiopia	3–4	Congo
Getaneh 41'; Fekadu 82'; Shimelis 90+1'	Report (FIFA); Report (CAF)	Bifouma 43'; Ondama 63'; N'Dinga 75'; Binguila 81'

Addis Ababa Stadium, Addis Ababa
Attendance: 30,000
Referee: Mohamed Said Kordi (Tunisia)
17 November 2015
16:00 UTC+1

Congo	2–1	Ethiopia
N'Ganga 48'; Bifouma 53'	Report (FIFA); Report (CAF)	Getaneh 28'

Stade Alphonse Massemba-Débat, Brazzaville
Attendance: 17,000
Referee: El Fadil Mohamed (Sudan)

Congo won 6–4 on aggregate and advanced to the third round.

14 November 2015
15:30 UTC+1

Chad	1–0	Egypt
N'Douassel 73'	Report (FIFA); Report (CAF)

Stade Omnisports Idriss Mahamat Ouya, N'Djamena
Attendance: 10,000
Referee: Ferdinand Udoh (Nigeria)
17 November 2015
18:30 UTC+2

Egypt	4–0	Chad
Elneny 5'; Said 10'; Hassan Mahgoub 36', 40'	Report (FIFA); Report (CAF)

Borg El Arab Stadium, Alexandria
Attendance: 35,000
Referee: Thierry Nkurunziza (Burundi)

Egypt won 4–1 on aggregate and advanced to the third round.

13 November 2015
15:00 UTC+3

Comoros	0–0	Ghana
	Report (FIFA); Report (CAF)

Stade Said Mohamed Cheikh, Mitsamiouli
Attendance: 7,000
Referee: Norman Matemera (Zimbabwe)
17 November 2015
15:00 UTC±0

Ghana	2–0	Comoros
Wakaso 18'; J. Ayew 85'	Report (FIFA); Report (CAF)

Baba Yara Stadium, Kumasi
Attendance: 16,480
Referee: Mohamed Ragab Omar (Libya)

Ghana won 2–0 on aggregate and advanced to the third round.

13 November 2015
19:00 UTC+2

Swaziland	0–0	Nigeria
	Report (FIFA); Report (CAF)

Somhlolo National Stadium, Lobamba
Attendance: 5,918
Referee: Akintoye Koole (Benin)
17 November 2015
16:00 UTC+1

Nigeria	2–0	Swaziland
Simon 51'; Ambrose 87'	Report (FIFA); Report (CAF)

Adokiye Amiesimaka Stadium, Port Harcourt
Attendance: 27,000
Referee: Jackson Pavaza (Namibia)

Nigeria won 2–0 on aggregate and advanced to the third round.

14 November 2015
18:00 UTC+2

Botswana	2–1	Mali
Gadibolae 14'; Mogorosi 24'	Report (FIFA); Report (CAF)	Sow 56'

Francistown Stadium, Francistown
Attendance: 26,223
Referee: Ali Adelaïd (Comoros)
17 November 2015
19:00 UTC±0

Mali	2–0	Botswana
Diabaté 10' (pen.); Sako 30'	Report (FIFA); Report (CAF)

Stade du 26 Mars, Bamako
Attendance: 15,000
Referee: Ali Lemghaifry (Mauritania)

Mali won 3–2 on aggregate and advanced to the third round.

12 November 2015
15:30 UTC+2

Burundi	2–3	DR Congo
Amissi 38', 83'	Report (FIFA); Report (CAF)	Bolasie 5'; Mubele 86', 88'

Prince Louis Rwagasore Stadium, Bujumbura
Attendance: 8,000
Referee: Mbongseni Fakudze (Swaziland)
15 November 2015
15:30 UTC+1

DR Congo	3–0 Awarded	Burundi
Nkololo 17'; Bolasie 78' (pen.)	Report (FIFA); Report (CAF)	Mbokani 28' (o.g.); Abdul Razak 89' (pen.)

Stade des Martyrs, Kinshasa
Attendance: 80,000
Referee: Luelseghed Ghebremichael (Eritrea)

DR Congo won 6–2 on aggregate and advanced to the third round.

13 November 2015
16:00 UTC±0

Liberia	0–1	Ivory Coast
	Report (FIFA); Report (CAF)	Cyriac 44'

Antoinette Tubman Stadium, Monrovia
Attendance: 12,000
Referee: Youssef Essrayri (Tunisia)
17 November 2015
17:00 UTC±0

Ivory Coast	3–0	Liberia
Sio 16', 35'; Seri 64'	Report (FIFA); Report (CAF)

Stade Félix Houphouët-Boigny, Abidjan
Attendance: 13,000
Referee: Lazard Tsiba (Congo)

Ivory Coast won 4–0 on aggregate and advanced to the third round.

13 November 2015
14:30 UTC+3

Madagascar	2–2	Senegal
Andriatsima 27'; Rakotoharimalala 59'	Report (FIFA); Report (CAF)	Diouf 71'; Mané 81'

Mahamasina Municipal Stadium, Antananarivo
Attendance: 24,000
Referee: Hudu Munyemana (Rwanda)
17 November 2015
19:00 UTC±0

Senegal	3–0	Madagascar
Kouyaté 20'; Konaté 53'; Diouf 82'	Report (FIFA); Report (CAF)

Stade Léopold Sédar Senghor, Dakar
Attendance: 35,000
Referee: Joshua Bondo (Botswana)

Senegal won 5–2 on aggregate and advanced to the third round.

13 November 2015
16:00 UTC+3

Kenya	1–0	Cape Verde
Olunga 9'	Report (FIFA); Report (CAF)

Nyayo National Stadium, Nairobi
Attendance: 12,000
Referee: Denis Dembélé (Ivory Coast)
17 November 2015
18:00 UTC−1

Cape Verde	2–0	Kenya
Héldon 45', 52'	Report (FIFA); Report (CAF)

Estádio Nacional de Cabo Verde, Praia
Attendance: 12,000
Referee: Joseph Lamptey (Ghana)

Cape Verde won 2–1 on aggregate and advanced to the third round.

14 November 2015
16:30 UTC+3

Tanzania	2–2	Algeria
Maguri 43'; Samatta 55'	Report (FIFA); Report (CAF)	Slimani 72', 75'

Benjamin Mkapa National Stadium, Dar es Salaam
Attendance: 37,913
Referee: Mahamadou Keita (Mali)
17 November 2015
19:15 UTC+1

Algeria	7–0	Tanzania
Brahimi 1'; Ghoulam 23', 59' (pen.); Mahrez 43'; Slimani 49' (pen.), 75'; Medjani 72'	Report (FIFA); Report (CAF)

Stade Mustapha Tchaker, Blida
Attendance: 35,000
Referee: Sidi Alioum (Cameroon)

Algeria won 9–2 on aggregate and advanced to the third round.

11 November 2015
20:00 UTC+3

Sudan	0–1	Zambia
	Report (FIFA); Report (CAF)	Kalengo 28'

Karima Stadium, Karima
Attendance: 12,000
Referee: Mohamed Benouza (Algeria)
15 November 2015
15:00 UTC+2

Zambia	2–0	Sudan
Musonda 59'; Kalengo 81'	Report (FIFA); Report (CAF)

Levy Mwanawasa Stadium, Ndola
Attendance: 40,000
Referee: Bakary Gassama (Gambia)

Zambia won 3–0 on aggregate and advanced to the third round.

13 November 2015
14:30 UTC+1

Libya	1–0	Rwanda
Al Badri 46' (pen.)	Report (FIFA); Report (CAF)

Stade Olympique, Sousse (Tunisia) (Note: Libya played their home leg in Tunisia due to the Libyan Civil War.)
Attendance: 500
Referee: Malang Diedhiou (Senegal)
17 November 2015
15:30 UTC+2

Rwanda	1–3	Libya
Tuyisenge 45+3'	Report (FIFA); Report (CAF)	El Monir 36', 90+3'; Al Ghanodi 48'

Stade Régional Nyamirambo, Kigali
Attendance: 8,000
Referee: Djamal Aden (Djibouti)

Libya won 4–1 on aggregate and advanced to the third round.

12 November 2015
19:00 UTC±0

Morocco	2–0	Equatorial Guinea
El-Arabi 30'; Bammou 66'	Report (FIFA); Report (CAF)

Stade Adrar, Agadir
Attendance: 32,000
Referee: Daniel Bennett (South Africa)
15 November 2015
16:00 UTC+1

Equatorial Guinea	1–0	Morocco
Rui 14'	Report (FIFA); Report (CAF)

Estadio de Bata, Bata
Attendance: 20,000
Referee: Janny Sikazwe (Zambia)

Morocco won 2–1 on aggregate and advanced to the third round.

11 November 2015
19:00 UTC+2

Mozambique	1–0	Gabon
Pelembe 54'	Report (FIFA); Report (CAF)

Estádio do Zimpeto, Maputo
Attendance: 18,730
Referee: Parmendra Nunkoo (Mauritius)
14 November 2015
18:00 UTC+1

Gabon	1–0 (a.e.t.)	Mozambique
Evouna 2'	Report (FIFA); Report (CAF)
Penalties
Poko (penalty scored); Evouna (penalty missed); Tandjigora (penalty scored); Obiang (penalty scored); Aubameyang (penalty scored)	4–3	(penalty scored) Júnior; (penalty missed) Miquissone; (penalty missed) Baúque; (penalty scored) Domingues; (penalty scored) Miró

Stade d'Angondjé, Libreville
Attendance: 20,000
Referee: Bernard Camille (Seychelles)

1–1 on aggregate. Gabon won the penalty shoot-out 4–3 and advanced to the third round.

12 November 2015
16:00 UTC+1

Benin	2–1	Burkina Faso
Sessègnon 45+2' (pen.); Bello 84'	Report (FIFA); Report (CAF)	Nakoulma 51'

Stade de l'Amitié, Cotonou
Attendance: 17,000
Referee: Bouchaïb El Ahrach (Morocco)
17 November 2015
18:00 UTC±0

Burkina Faso	2–0	Benin
Pitroipa 17' (pen.); Traoré 70'	Report (FIFA); Report (CAF)

Stade du 4 Août, Ouagadougou
Attendance: 21,212
Referee: Mehdi Abid Charef (Algeria)

Burkina Faso won 3–2 on aggregate and advanced to the third round.

12 November 2015
15:30 UTC±0

Togo	0–1	Uganda
	Report (FIFA); Report (CAF)	Miya 39'

Stade de Kégué, Lomé
Attendance: 25,000
Referee: Yakhouba Keita (Guinea)
15 November 2015
16:00 UTC+3

Uganda	3–0	Togo
Massa 4'; Miya 41', 45'	Report (FIFA); Report (CAF)

Mandela National Stadium, Kampala
Attendance: 40,000
Referee: Hamada Nampiandraza (Madagascar)

Uganda won 4–0 on aggregate and advanced to the third round.

13 November 2015
15:30 UTC+1

Angola	1–3	South Africa
Gelson 2'	Report (FIFA); Report (CAF)	Rantie 13'; Gabuza 20'; Jali 80' (pen.)

Estadio Nacional de Ombaka, Benguela
Attendance: 25,000
Referee: Bamlak Tessema Weyesa (Ethiopia)
17 November 2015
19:00 UTC+2

South Africa	1–0	Angola
Manucho Diniz 66' (o.g.)	Report (FIFA); Report (CAF)

Moses Mabhida Stadium, Durban
Attendance: 17,152
Referee: Davies Omweno (Kenya)

South Africa won 4–1 on aggregate and advanced to the third round.

== Goalscorers ==
There were 97 goals scored in 40 matches, for an average of 2.42 goals per match.

4 goals

- (Algeria) Islam Slimani

3 goals

- (Uganda) Farouk Miya

2 goals

- (Algeria) Faouzi Ghoulam
- (Burundi) Cédric Amissi
- (Cape Verde) Héldon Ramos
- (Republic of the Congo) Thievy Bifouma
- (Ivory Coast) Giovanni Sio
- (Democratic Republic of the Congo) Yannick Bolasie
- (Democratic Republic of the Congo) Firmin Ndombe Mubele
- (Egypt) Ahmed Hassan Mahgoub
- (Ethiopia) Getaneh Kebede
- (Guinea) Naby Keïta
- (Libya) Mohamed El Monir
- (Senegal) Mame Biram Diouf
- (Zambia) Winston Kalengo

1 goal

- (Algeria) Yacine Brahimi
- (Algeria) Riyad Mahrez
- (Algeria) Carl Medjani
- (Angola) Gelson
- (Benin) Babatounde Bello
- (Benin) Stéphane Sessègnon
- (Botswana) Tapiwa Gadibolae
- (Botswana) Joel Mogorosi
- (Burkina Faso) Préjuce Nakoulma
- (Burkina Faso) Jonathan Pitroipa
- (Burkina Faso) Bertrand Traoré
- (Burundi) Fiston Abdul Razak
- (Cameroon) Vincent Aboubakar
- (Cameroon) Stéphane Mbia
- (Cameroon) Edgar Salli
- (Chad) Ezechiel N'Douassel
- (Republic of the Congo) Hardy Binguila
- (Republic of the Congo) Delvin N'Dinga
- (Republic of the Congo) Francis N'Ganga
- (Republic of the Congo) Fabrice Ondama
- (Ivory Coast) Cyriac
- (Ivory Coast) Jean Seri
- (Democratic Republic of the Congo) Michaël Nkololo
- (Egypt) Mohamed Elneny
- (Egypt) Abdallah El Said
- (Ethiopia) Dawit Fekadu
- (Ethiopia) Shimelis Bekele
- (Equatorial Guinea) Rui
- (Gabon) Malick Evouna
- (Ghana) Jordan Ayew
- (Ghana) Mubarak Wakaso
- (Guinea) Idrissa Sylla
- (Kenya) Michael Olunga
- (Libya) Faisal Al Badri
- (Libya) Mohamed Al Ghanodi
- (Madagascar) Faneva Imà Andriatsima
- (Madagascar) Njiva Rakotoharimalala
- (Mali) Cheick Diabaté
- (Mali) Bakary Sako
- (Mali) Samba Sow
- (Mauritania) Cheikh Moulaye Ahmed
- (Mauritania) Oumar N'Diaye
- (Morocco) Yacine Bammou
- (Morocco) Youssef El-Arabi
- (Mozambique) Hélder Pelembe
- (Nigeria) Efe Ambrose
- (Nigeria) Moses Simon
- (Rwanda) Jacques Tuyisenge
- (Senegal) Moussa Konaté
- (Senegal) Cheikhou Kouyaté
- (Senegal) Sadio Mané
- (South Africa) Thamsanqa Gabuza
- (South Africa) Andile Jali
- (South Africa) Tokelo Rantie
- (Tanzania) Elias Maguri
- (Tanzania) Mbwana Samatta
- (Tunisia) Syam Ben Youssef
- (Tunisia) Saad Bguir
- (Tunisia) Yassine Chikhaoui
- (Tunisia) Wahbi Khazri
- (Uganda) Geofrey Massa
- (Zambia) Lubambo Musonda

1 own goal

- (Angola) Manucho Diniz (against South Africa)
- (Democratic Republic of the Congo) Dieumerci Mbokani (against Burundi)
