= Tapiwa Gadibolae =

Motswana footballer

Personal information
- Full name: Tapiwa Gadibolae
- Date of birth: 26 February 1993 (age 33)
- Place of birth: Nata, Botswana
- Position: Defender

Team information
- Current team: Township Rollers F.C.
- Number: 25

Senior career*
Years	Team	Apps	(Gls)
2015–	Township Rollers F.C.		

International career^{‡}
2015–	Botswana	2	(1)
- * Club domestic league appearances and goals as of 10:44, 15 November 2015 (UTC) ‡ National team caps and goals as of 10:44, 15 November 2015 (UTC)

Tapiwa Gadibolae (born 26 February 1993) is a Motswana footballer who plays for Township Rollers F.C.

== International career ==
=== International goals ===
Scores and results list Botswana's goal tally first.

No	Date	Venue	Opponent	Score	Result	Competition
1.	14 November 2015	Francistown Stadium, Francistown, Botswana	Mali	1–0	2–1	2018 FIFA World Cup qualification
