= F.C. Johansen =

FC Johansen
- Full name: Football Club Johansen
- Founded: 2004
- Ground: National Stadium, Freetown
- Capacity: 60,000
- League: Sierra Leone National Premier League
- 2022–23: Sierra Leone National Premier League, 17th of 18
Home colours	Away colours

Football Club Johansen is a Sierra Leonean football club founded in 2004 and is based in the capital city, Freetown. The club is run by Isha Johansen and her Norwegian husband Arne Birger Johansen.

== History ==
In 2011, FC Johansen played for the first time in the Sierra Leone National First Division. That year they did not lose a single match and were promoted to the Sierra Leone National Premier League.

The club made its debut in the Premier League in 2012, where they finished in fourth place. In 2013, their second year in the Premier League, the club took part in the CAF Confederation Cup, its maiden appearance at the continental level. They played Barack Young Controllers (Liberia) in the qualifying rounds, losing 1–0 on aggregate and failing to progress to the next round.

== Performance in CAF competitions ==
- CAF Confederation Cup: 1 appearance

2013 – Qualifying round
