= 2018 FIFA World Cup qualification (CAF) =

Tournament details
- Dates: 7 October 2015 – 14 November 2017
- Teams: 54 (from 1 confederation)

Tournament statistics
- Matches played: 127
- Goals scored: 309 (2.43 per match)
- Attendance: 2,862,856 (22,542 per match)
- Top scorer(s): (Burkina Faso) Préjuce Nakoulma (Egypt) Mohamed Salah (5 goals each)

The African section of the 2018 FIFA World Cup qualification acted as qualifiers for the 2018 FIFA World Cup, held in Russia, for national teams which were members of the Confederation of African Football (CAF). A total of five slots in the final tournament were available for CAF teams.

The CAF Executive Committee approved the format for the qualifiers of the 2018 FIFA World Cup on 14 January 2015, with three preliminary rounds before a final group stage featuring 20 teams. The number of preliminary rounds was reduced to two, based on information provided by FIFA in early July 2015.

== Format ==
The qualification structure was as follows:

- First round: 26 teams, ranked 28–53, played home-and-away over two legs. The 13 winners advanced to the second round.
- Second round: 40 teams, ranked 1–27 and 13 first round winners, played home-and-away over two legs. The 20 winners advanced to the third round.
- Third round: 20 teams which had advanced from the second round were divided into five groups of four teams to play home-and-away round-robin matches. The winners of each group qualified for the 2018 FIFA World Cup.

== Entrants ==
All 54 FIFA-affiliated football associations from CAF entered qualification. However, Zimbabwe were expelled from the competition on 12 March 2015 due to their failure to pay former coach José Claudinei a severance fee, a decision that the Zimbabwe Football Association unsuccessfully appealed.

The July 2015 FIFA Rankings were used to seed the teams for the first two rounds, both of which were drawn in Russia on 25 July 2015. (World rankings shown in brackets)

From the July 2015 FIFA World Rankings
Bye to second round (ranked 1st to 27th)	Competing in first round (ranked 28th to 54th)
1. Algeria (19); 2. Ivory Coast (21); 3. Ghana (25); 4. Tunisia (32); 5. Senegal (39); 6. Cameroon (42); 7. Congo (47); 8. Cape Verde (52); 9. Egypt (55); 10. Nigeria (57); 11. Guinea (58); 12. DR Congo (60); 13. Mali (61); 14. Equatorial Guinea (63); 15. Gabon (65); 16. South Africa (70); 17. Zambia (71); 18. Burkina Faso (72); 19. Uganda (73); 20. Rwanda (78); 21. Togo (83); 22. Morocco (84); 23. Sudan (90); 24. Angola (92); 25. Mozambique (95); 26. Benin (96); 27. Libya (96)	28. Niger (96); 29. Ethiopia (101); 30. Malawi (108); 31. Sierra Leone (111); 32. Zimbabwe (112); 33. Namibia (114); 34. Kenya (116); 35. Botswana (120); 36. Madagascar (122); 37. Mauritania (128); 38. Burundi (131); 39. Lesotho (131); 40. Guinea-Bissau (133); 41. Swaziland (138); 42. Tanzania (139); 43. Gambia (143); 44. Liberia (161); 45. Central African Republic (170); 46. Chad (173); 47. Mauritius (180); 48. Seychelles (186); 49. Comoros (187); 50. São Tomé and Príncipe (189); 51. South Sudan (195); 52. Eritrea (204); 53. Somalia (205); 54. Djibouti (207)

Note: Niger had to enter the first round as they had fewer FIFA ranking points (345.31) than Benin (345.46) and Libya (345.35). In the FIFA World Rankings, teams share the same ranking if their ranking points round to the same whole number.

== Schedule ==
The schedule of the competition was as follows.

Round	Matchday	Date
First round	First leg	5–13 October 2015
First round	Second leg	5–13 October 2015
Second round	First leg	9–17 November 2015
Second round	Second leg	9–17 November 2015

Round	Matchday	Date
Third round	Matchday 1	3–11 October 2016
Third round	Matchday 2	7–15 November 2016
Third round	Matchday 3	28 August – 5 September 2017
Third round	Matchday 4	28 August – 5 September 2017
Third round	Matchday 5	2–10 October 2017
Third round	Matchday 6	6–14 November 2017

== First round ==
The draw for the first round was held as part of the 2018 FIFA World Cup Preliminary Draw on 25 July 2015, starting 18:00 MSK (UTC+3), at the Konstantinovsky Palace in Strelna, Saint Petersburg, Russia.

Team 1	Agg.	Team 2	1st leg	2nd leg
Somalia	0–6	Niger	0–2	0–4
South Sudan	1–5	Mauritania	1–1	0–4
Gambia	2–3	Namibia	1–1	1–2
São Tomé and Príncipe	1–3	Ethiopia	1–0	0–3
Chad	2–2 (a)	Sierra Leone	1–0	1–2
Comoros	1–1 (a)	Lesotho	0–0	1–1
Djibouti	1–8	Swaziland	0–6	1–2
Eritrea	1–5	Botswana	0–2	1–3
Seychelles	0–3	Burundi	0–1	0–2
Liberia	4–2	Guinea-Bissau	1–1	3–1
Central African Republic	2–5	Madagascar	0–3	2–2
Mauritius	2–5	Kenya	2–5	0–0
Tanzania	2–1	Malawi	2–0	0–1

== Second round ==
The draw for the second round was held as part of the 2018 FIFA World Cup Preliminary Draw on 25 July 2015, starting 18:00 MSK (UTC+3), at the Konstantinovsky Palace in Strelna, Saint Petersburg, Russia.

Team 1	Agg.	Team 2	1st leg	2nd leg
Niger	0–3	Cameroon	0–3	0–0
Mauritania	2–4	Tunisia	1–2	1–2
Namibia	0–3	Guinea	0–1	0–2
Ethiopia	4–6	Congo	3–4	1–2
Chad	1–4	Egypt	1–0	0–4
Comoros	0–2	Ghana	0–0	0–2
Swaziland	0–2	Nigeria	0–0	0–2
Botswana	2–3	Mali	2–1	0–2
Burundi	2–6	DR Congo	2–3	0–3 (Note: FIFA awarded Congo DR a 3–0 win as a result of Burundi fielding the ineligible player Gaël Bigirimana. The match originally ended 2–2.)
Liberia	0–4	Ivory Coast	0–1	0–3
Madagascar	2–5	Senegal	2–2	0–3
Kenya	1–2	Cape Verde	1–0	0–2
Tanzania	2–9	Algeria	2–2	0–7
Sudan	0–3	Zambia	0–1	0–2
Libya	4–1	Rwanda	1–0	3–1
Morocco	2–1	Equatorial Guinea	2–0	0–1
Mozambique	1–1 (3–4 p)	Gabon	1–0	0–1 (a.e.t.)
Benin	2–3	Burkina Faso	2–1	0–2
Togo	0–4	Uganda	0–1	0–3
Angola	1–4	South Africa	1–3	0–1

== Third round ==
The draw for the third round was held on 24 June 2016, 17:00 EET (UTC+2), at the CAF headquarters in Cairo, Egypt.

=== Groups ===
2018 FIFA World Cup qualification tiebreakers
In league format, the ranking of teams in each group was based on the following criteria (regulations Articles 20.6 and 20.7):
1. Points (3 points for a win, 1 point for a draw, 0 points for a loss)
2. Overall goal difference
3. Overall goals scored
4. Points in matches between tied teams
5. Goal difference in matches between tied teams
6. Goals scored in matches between tied teams
7. Away goals scored in matches between tied teams (if the tie was only between two teams in home-and-away league format)
8. Fair play points
  - first yellow card: minus 1 point
  - indirect red card (second yellow card): minus 3 points
  - direct red card: minus 4 points
  - yellow card and direct red card: minus 5 points
9. Drawing of lots by the FIFA Organising Committee

==== Group A ====
Pos	Team	Pld	W	D	L	GF	GA	GD	Pts	Qualification	Tunisia	Democratic Republic of the Congo	Libya	Guinea
1	Tunisia	6	4	2	0	11	4	+7	14	Qualification to 2018 FIFA World Cup	—	2–1	0–0	2–0
2	DR Congo	6	4	1	1	14	7	+7	13		2–2	—	4–0	3–1
3	Libya	6	1	1	4	4	10	−6	4		0–1	1–2	—	1–0
4	Guinea	6	1	0	5	6	14	−8	3		1–4	1–2	3–2	—

Source: FIFA

==== Group B ====
Pos	Team	Pld	W	D	L	GF	GA	GD	Pts	Qualification	Nigeria	Zambia	Cameroon	Algeria
1	Nigeria	6	4	1	1	11	6	+5	13	Qualification to 2018 FIFA World Cup	—	1–0	4–0	3–1
2	Zambia	6	2	2	2	8	7	+1	8		1–2	—	2–2	3–1
3	Cameroon	6	1	4	1	7	9	−2	7		1–1	1–1	—	2–0
4	Algeria	6	1	1	4	6	10	−4	4		3–0 (Note: FIFA awarded Algeria a 3–0 win as a result of Nigeria fielding the ineligible player Shehu Abdullahi, after the match had ended in a 1–1 draw. Abdullahi failed to serve a one-game ban after receiving two yellow cards in the qualifying competition.)	0–1	1–1	—

Source: FIFA

==== Group C ====
Pos	Team	Pld	W	D	L	GF	GA	GD	Pts	Qualification	Morocco	Côte d'Ivoire	Gabon	Mali
1	Morocco	6	3	3	0	11	0	+11	12	Qualification to 2018 FIFA World Cup	—	0–0	3–0	6–0
2	Ivory Coast	6	2	2	2	7	5	+2	8		0–2	—	1–2	3–1
3	Gabon	6	1	3	2	2	7	−5	6		0–0	0–3	—	0–0
4	Mali	6	0	4	2	1	9	−8	4		0–0	0–0	0–0	—

Source: FIFA

==== Group D ====
Pos	Team	Pld	W	D	L	GF	GA	GD	Pts	Qualification	Senegal	Burkina Faso	Cape Verde	South Africa
1	Senegal	6	4	2	0	10	3	+7	14	Qualification to 2018 FIFA World Cup	—	0–0	2–0	2–1
2	Burkina Faso	6	2	3	1	10	6	+4	9		2–2	—	4–0	1–1
3	Cape Verde	6	2	0	4	4	12	−8	6		0–2	0–2	—	2–1
4	South Africa	6	1	1	4	7	10	−3	4		0–2 (Note: FIFA ordered a replay of the original South Africa v Senegal match after the Court of Arbitration for Sport (CAS) upheld the lifetime ban of match referee Joseph Lamptey. Originally South Africa had defeated Senegal 2–1.)	3–1	1–2	—

Source: FIFA

==== Group E ====
Pos	Team	Pld	W	D	L	GF	GA	GD	Pts	Qualification	Egypt	Uganda	Ghana	Republic of the Congo
1	Egypt	6	4	1	1	8	4	+4	13	Qualification to 2018 FIFA World Cup	—	1–0	2–0	2–1
2	Uganda	6	2	3	1	3	2	+1	9		1–0	—	0–0	1–0
3	Ghana	6	1	4	1	7	5	+2	7		1–1	0–0	—	1–1
4	Congo	6	0	2	4	5	12	−7	2		1–2	1–1	1–5	—

Source: FIFA

== Qualified teams ==
The following five teams qualified for the final tournament.

Team	Qualified as	Qualified on	Previous appearances in FIFA World Cup^{1}
Tunisia	Group A winners	11 November 2017	4 (1978, 1998, 2002, 2006)
Nigeria	Group B winners	7 October 2017	5 (1994, 1998, 2002, 2010, 2014)
Morocco	Group C winners	11 November 2017	4 (1970, 1986, 1994, 1998)
Senegal	Group D winners	10 November 2017	1 (2002)
Egypt	Group E winners	8 October 2017	2 (1934, 1990)

== Top goalscorers ==
There were 309 goals scored in 127 matches, for an average of 2.43 goals per match.

5 goals

- (Burkina Faso) Préjuce Nakoulma
- (Egypt) Mohamed Salah

4 goals

- (Algeria) Islam Slimani
- (Burundi) Fiston Abdul Razak
- (Democratic Republic of the Congo) Firmin Ndombe Mubele
- (Guinea) Naby Keïta
- (Liberia) William Jebor
- (Morocco) Khalid Boutaïb
- (Niger) Moussa Maâzou
- (Uganda) Farouk Miya

Below are full goalscorer lists for each round:

- First round
- Second round
- Third round

== Incidents ==
=== Match fixing scandal ===
On 6 September 2017, the FIFA World Cup Qualifiers Bureau annulled the result of the South Africa v Senegal match played on 12 November 2016, and ordered the match to be replayed during the November 2017 international window, which was confirmed by the Organising Committee for FIFA Competitions on 14 September 2017. Originally, South Africa had won the match 2–1, but Ghanian referee Joseph Lamptey was banned for life by the FIFA Disciplinary Committee on 20 March 2017 for unlawfully influencing the match after awarding South Africa a penalty for handball. The ban was upheld by the FIFA Appeal Committee and subsequently by the Court of Arbitration for Sport on 6 September 2017. The match was replayed in Polokwane, South Africa on 10 November 2017, with Senegal winning 2–0 to finish first in their group and qualify for the 2018 FIFA World Cup.

=== Fan behaviour ===
After Morocco qualified for the tournament with a 2–0 victory over Ivory Coast, the celebrations by the Moroccan community in Brussels turned into a riot with cars burnt, shops looted by some 300 rioters and 20 police officers injured. Firefighters sent to put out the fires were also attacked by the rioters.
