= Sandile Hlatjwako =

Liswati footballer

Personal information
- Full name: Sandile Hlatjwako
- Date of birth: February 14, 1988 (age 38)
- Place of birth: Swaziland
- Height: 1.80 m (5 ft 11 in)
- Position: Forward

Team information
- Current team: Mbabane Swallows

Senior career*
Years	Team	Apps	(Gls)
2005–2008	Malanti Chiefs		
2008	Nasaf Qarshi	5	(1)
2014–	Mbabane Swallows		

International career^{‡}
2015–	Eswatini	13	(4)
- * Club domestic league appearances and goals ‡ National team caps and goals as of 22:47, 19 April 2016 (UTC)

Sandile Hlatjwako (born 14 February 1988) is a Liswati footballer.

== International career ==
=== International goals ===
Scores and results list eSwatini's goal tally first.

No	Date	Venue	Opponent	Score	Result	Competition
1.	7 March 2014	Setsoto Stadium, Maseru, Lesotho	Lesotho	1–0	1–0	Friendly
2.	9 October 2015	El Hadj Hassan Gouled Aptidon Stadium, Djibouti City, Djibouti	Djibouti	4–0	6–0	2018 FIFA World Cup qualification
3.	17 October 2015	Somhlolo National Stadium, Lobamba, Swaziland	Djibouti	1–0	2–1	2018 FIFA World Cup qualification
4.	17 October 2015	Somhlolo National Stadium, Lobamba, Swaziland	Djibouti	2–1	2–1	2018 FIFA World Cup qualification
