= Ibraime Cassamá =

Bissau-Guinean association football player

Personal information
- Full name: Ibraime Barreto Cassamá
- Date of birth: 24 January 1986 (age 40)
- Place of birth: São Sebastião da Pedreira, Lisbon, Portugal
- Height: 1.86 m (6 ft 1 in)
- Positions: Defensive midfielder; centre back

Youth career
- Galitos
- Barreirense

Senior career*
Years	Team	Apps	(Gls)
2004–2005	Barreirense		
2006–2007	Sertanense		
2008–2009	Eléctrico		
2009–2012	Praiense		
2012–2014	Moura	23	(3)
2013–2014	→ Oriental (loan)	6	(1)
2014–2015	Cova da Piedade	13	(1)
2015	Interclube	11	(0)
2016–2017	Académica do Lobito	19	(2)
2017–2018	Sintrense	23	(1)
2018–2021	Real	70	(8)
2021–2022	Sacavenense	5	(0)

International career
2015	Guinea-Bissau	4	(1)
- * Club domestic league appearances and goals

Ibraime Barreto Cassamá (born 24 January 1986) is a Bissau-Guinean footballer who plays as a defensive midfielder or centre back.

== Career statistics ==
Scores and results list Guinea-Bissau's goal tally first.

No	Date	Venue	Opponent	Score	Result	Competition
1	13 October 2015	Estádio 24 de Setembro, Bissau, Guinea-Bissau	Liberia	1–2	1–3	2018 FIFA World Cup qualification
