= Moussa Samba =

Mauritanian footballer

Personal information
- Full name: Moussa Samba
- Date of birth: 31 December 1988 (age 37)
- Place of birth: Mauritania
- Position: Midfielder

Senior career*
Years	Team	Apps	(Gls)
2010–2020	Tevragh-Zeina		
2020–2021	Al-Nasr		
2021	Al-Qaisumah		

International career^{‡}
2015–	Mauritania	1	(1)
- * Club domestic league appearances and goals ‡ National team caps and goals as of 18:27, 14 October 2015 (UTC)

Moussa Samba (Arabic: موسى سامبا) is a Mauritanian footballer who plays as a midfielder for the Mauritania national team.

== International career ==
=== International goals ===
Scores and results list Mauritania's goal tally first.

No.	Date	Venue	Opponent	Score	Result	Competition
1.	13 October 2015	Stade Olympique, Nouakchott, Mauritania	South Sudan	3–0	4–0	2018 FIFA World Cup qualification
2.	12 August 2017	Stade Olympique, Nouakchott, Mauritania	Mali	2–1	2–2	2018 African Nations Championship qualification
