= Dawit Fekadu =

Ethiopian footballer

Personal information
- Date of birth: 29 April 1986 (age 40)
- Place of birth: Ethiopia
- Height: 5 ft 9 in (1.75 m)
- Position: Forward

Team information
- Current team: Welwalo Adigrat

Senior career*
Years	Team	Apps	(Gls)
- Dedebit
2018	Welwalo Adigrat		

International career^{‡}
2011–	Ethiopia	22	(3)
- * Club domestic league appearances and goals ‡ National team caps and goals as of 8 February 2017

Dawit Fekadu (Amharic:ዳዊት ፍቃዱ) is an Ethiopian professional footballer, who plays as a forward for Welwalo Adigrat University F.C. in the Ethiopian Premier League. He formerly played with Dedebit F.C.

== International career ==
In January 2014, coach Sewnet Bishaw, invited him to be a part of the Ethiopia squad for the 2014 African Nations Championship. The team was eliminated in the group stages after losing to Congo, Libya and Ghana.

=== International goals ===
Scores and results list Ethiopia's goal tally first.

No	Date	Venue	Opponent	Score	Result	Competition
1.	11 October 2015	Addis Ababa Stadium, Addis Ababa, Ethiopia	São Tomé and Príncipe	1–0	3–0	2018 FIFA World Cup qualification
2.	17 October 2015	Addis Ababa Stadium, Addis Ababa, Ethiopia	Congo	2–4	3–4	2018 FIFA World Cup qualification
3.	29 March 2016	Addis Ababa Stadium, Addis Ababa, Ethiopia	Algeria	3–2	3–3	2017 Africa Cup of Nations qualification
