= Michaïlou Dramé =

Burkinabé footballer

Personal information
- Date of birth: 3 July 1992 (age 34)
- Place of birth: Bamako, Mali
- Positions: Midfielder; winger

Team information
- Current team: AS Gabès

Senior career*
Years	Team	Apps	(Gls)
2009–2010	ES Hammam-Sousse		
2010–2014	Étoile du Sahel		
2014	Al-Ahly		
2015	Najran SC		
2015	AS La Marsa		
2016	Étoile du Sahel		
2016–2017	Stade Gabèsien		
2017–2018	Al-Ahli		
2019	Al-Nahda		
2019– 2020	AS Gabès		
2020–	Salitas		

International career^{‡}
2015–2017	Burkina Faso	2	(0)
- * Club domestic league appearances and goals as of 1 August 2020 ‡ National team caps and goals as of 1 August 2020

Michaïlou Dramé (born 3 July 1992) is a Burkinabé football midfielder who plays for Salitas.
