= Taoufik Salhi =

Tunisian footballer (born 1979)

Personal information
- Date of birth: 21 August 1979 (age 47)
- Place of birth: Tunis, Tunisia
- Height: 1.77 m (5 ft 10 in)
- Position: Midfielder

Senior career*
Years	Team	Apps	(Gls)
2001–2003	Club Africain		
2003–2006	Stade Tunisien		
2007–2008	Zorya Luhansk	13	(0)
2008–2009	Vostok	25	(8)
2010	Ordabasy	7	(0)
2010–2011	Sevastopol	20	(1)
2011–2012	Oleksandriya	26	(1)
2013	CS Sfaxien	14	(3)
- * Club domestic league appearances and goals

Taoufik Salhi (born 21 August 1979) is a Tunisian former professional footballer who played as a midfielder.

== Career ==
Salhi was born in Tunis. At the end of January 2007, he signed an 18-month contract with Zorya Luhansk.

In July 2010, Salhi joined Ukrainian Premier League side FC Sevastopol.
