= Ahmed Omran =

Egyptian footballer (born 1983)

Personal information
- Date of birth: July 9, 1983 (age 43)
- Height: 1.83 m (6 ft 0 in)
- Position: Midfielder

Team information
- Current team: ENPPI Club

Youth career
- Zamalek SC

Senior career*
Years	Team	Apps	(Gls)
????–2005	Zamalek SC		
2005–2008	Suez Cement		
2008–2009	Itesalat	29	(9)
2009–2012	El Gouna FC	63	(10)
2012–	ENPPI Club		

International career
- Egypt U-20
- * Club domestic league appearances and goals

Ahmed Omran (Arabic: أحمد عمران) is an Egyptian footballer. He currently plays for ENPPI Club in the Egyptian Premier League. He was a member of the Egyptian U-20 squad that won the title of the 2003 African Youth Championship held in Burkina Faso.

== Club career ==
In summer of 2009, he was reported that he had signed to join El Gouna FC as well as Petrojet. It was El Gouna who eventually won his services as the Egyptian Football Association ruled for its favor.
