= Demba Malick =

Central African Republic footballer

Personal information
- Full name: Demba Malick
- Date of birth: 20 April 1995 (age 31)
- Place of birth: Bangui, Central African Republic
- Height: 1.78 m (5 ft 10 in)
- Position: Striker

International career
Years	Team	Apps	(Gls)
2015–	Central African Republic	4	(1)

Demba Malick (born on 20 April 1995), is a football player who represents the Central African Republic national football team.
