= Hélder Pelembe =

Mozambican footballer

Personal information
- Date of birth: 20 September 1987 (age 39)
- Place of birth: Nampula, Mozambique
- Height: 1.85 m (6 ft 1 in)
- Position: Forward

Team information
- Current team: UD Songo

Senior career*
Years	Team	Apps	(Gls)
2006–2008	Ferroviário Nampula	13	(5)
2009–2010	Maxaquene		
2010–2011	Portimonense	11	(0)
2011–2012	Maxaquene		
2013	Liga Muçulmana	13	(4)
2013–	Orlando Pirates	18	(2)
2015–2016	→ Bloemfontein Celtic (loan)	9	(2)
2016–2017	Baroka	1	(0)
2018	UD Songo		
2019	Ferroviário de Nampula	17	(2)

International career^{‡}
2008–2016	Mozambique	24	(3)
- * Club domestic league appearances and goals as of 19 July 2018 ‡ National team caps and goals as of 19 July 2018

Hélder Pelembe (born 20 September 1987) is a Mozambican professional footballer who plays for Mozambican club UD Songo as a forward.

== Club career ==
After playing two years apiece in his country with Clube Ferroviário de Nampula and C.D. Maxaquene, in June 2010, Pelembe signed with Portimonense S.C. from Portugal, with the Algarve club freshly returned to the Primeira Liga. He made his debut in the competition on 13 August, playing the full 90 minutes in a 1–3 home loss against S.C. Braga.

After Portimonense's immediate relegation – with the player contributing with no goals, in only three starts – Pelembe returned to Mozambique and Maxaquene. In 2013, he joined fellow Moçambola side Liga Muçulmana de Maputo.

In December 2013, Pelembe moved to South African side Orlando Pirates on a three-year contract.

In January 2018, he moved to UD Songo, where he was part of their Confederation Cup campaign.

=== International goals ===
Scores and results list Mozambique's goal tally first.

No	Date	Venue	Opponent	Score	Result	Competition
1.	9 February 2011	Estádio da Machava, Matola, Mozambique	Botswana	1–1	1–1	Friendly
2.	5 March 2014	Estádio do Zimpeto, Maputo, Mozambique	Angola	1–1	1–1	Friendly
3.	11 November 2015	Estádio do Zimpeto, Maputo, Mozambique,	Gabon	1–0	1–0	2018 FIFA World Cup qualification
