= TCO Boeny =

Malagasy football club

Terrible de la Côte Ouest Boeny is a Malagasy football club. The team is based in the region of Boeny.

== Achievements ==
- Coupe de Madagascar: 1

2012

== Performance in CAF competitions ==
- CAF Confederation Cup: 1 appearance

2013 -
