= Abdul Sesay (footballer, born 1991) =

Sierra Leonean footballer

Personal information
- Full name: Abdul Sesay
- Date of birth: September 30, 1991 (age 35)
- Place of birth: Freetown, Sierra Leone
- Height: 1.77 m (5 ft 10 in)
- Position: Forward

Senior career*
Years	Team	Apps	(Gls)
2011	San Roque		
2012–2013	Atlantis FC	50	(21)
2013	Mladost Podgorica	2	(0)
2014	Atlantis FC	17	(1)
2015–2017	Oulun Palloseura	44	(16)
2017	Hercules	180	(6)
2018	TP-47	6	(10)

International career
2015–	Sierra Leone	6	(1)
- * Club domestic league appearances and goals

Abdul Sesay (born 30 September 1991) is a Sierra Leonean professional footballer who plays as a forward for Sierra Leone.

== International career ==
=== International goals ===
Scores and results list Sierra Leone's goal tally first.

No	Date	Venue	Opponent	Score	Result	Competition
1.	13 October 2015	Adokiye Amiesimaka Stadium, Port Harcourt, Nigeria	Chad	2–1	2–1	2018 FIFA World Cup qualification
2.	22 March 2016	National Stadium, Freetown, Sierra Leone	Malawi	1–1	1–1	Friendly
