= Mzwandile Ndzimandze =

Swazi footballer

Personal information
- Full name: Mzwandile Ndzimandze
- Date of birth: 2 October 1985 (age 41)
- Place of birth: Eswatini
- Position: Striker

Team information
- Current team: Pretoria University F.C.

Senior career*
Years	Team	Apps	(Gls)
?–2010	Mhlambanyatsi Rovers	?	(?)
2010–	Pretoria University F.C.	?	(?)
2012–	Sant Andreu	0	(0)

International career
2007–	Swaziland	11	(0)
- * Club domestic league appearances and goals

Mzwandile Ndzimandze (born 2 October 1985) is an Eswatini international footballer who plays for Pretoria University. He is commonly referred to as 'Dile'.

== Career ==
The striker joined in summer 2010 from Mhlambanyatsi Rovers of the Swazi Premier League to Pretoria University F.C.

== Personal life ==
His brother Mfanfikile 'Fash' Ndzimandze is also an international footballer for Eswatini.
