= Mossaâb Sassi =

Tunisian footballer

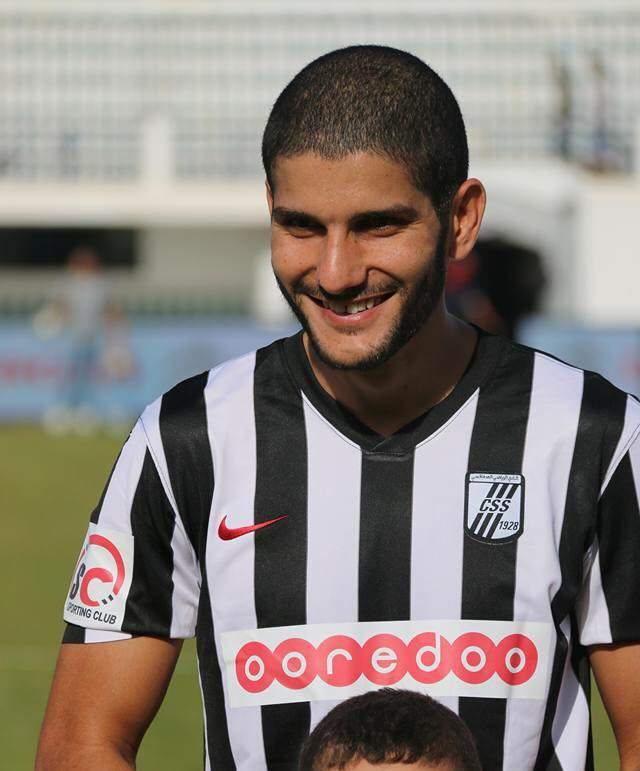

Personal information
- Full name: Mossaâb Sassi
- Date of birth: 12 March 1990 (age 36)
- Place of birth: Ariana, Tunisia
- Height: 1.86 m (6 ft 1 in)
- Position: Forward

Team information
- Current team: US Tataouine

Youth career
- -2004: Ariana
- 2004-2008: Étoile Sahel

Senior career*
Years	Team	Apps	(Gls)
2008–2014	Étoile Sahel	70	(11)
2014-2015	CA Bizertin	39	(3)
2015–2017	Sfaxien	23	(3)
2017	Hammam-Lif	14	(2)
2017–2019	Kairouan	35	(9)
2019–2020	Hetten	11	(7)
2020	Kairouan	9	(2)
2020–2021	Al-Nahda	35	(2)
2021–	US Tataouine		
- * Club domestic league appearances and goals

Mossaâb Sassi (born 12 March 1990) is a Tunisian footballer who currently plays as a forward for US Tataouine .

On 27 July 2021, Sassi joined US Tataouine.
