= Modou Sarr =

Gambian footballer

Personal information
- Date of birth: 12 May 1994 (age 32)
- Place of birth: Banjul, Gambia
- Height: 1.90 m (6 ft 3 in)
- Position: Midfielder

Team information
- Current team: Gamtel

Senior career*
Years	Team	Apps	(Gls)
2010–	Gamtel		

International career^{‡}
2011, 2015	Gambia	2	(0)
- * Club domestic league appearances and goals as of 1 August 2020 ‡ National team caps and goals as of 1 August 2020

Modou Sarr (born 12 May 1994) is a Gambian football midfielder who plays for Gamtel.
