= 2008–09 Elite One =

Elite One
- Champions: Tiko United

In the 2008–09 Elite One season, 14 teams competed. Tiko United won the championship.

== League standings ==
Pos	Team	Pld	W	D	L	GF	GA	GD	Pts
1	Tiko United (C)	26	13	10	3	30	19	+11	49
2	Union Douala	26	13	6	7	31	23	+8	45
3	Cotonsport Garoua	26	13	6	7	38	21	+17	45
4	Les Astres	26	11	9	6	31	25	+6	42
5	Fovu Baham	26	9	9	8	29	27	+2	36
6	Unisport Bafang	26	10	5	11	28	28	0	35
7	Panthère Bangangté	26	8	11	7	26	24	+2	35
8	Matelots	26	9	7	10	24	26	−2	34
9	Canon Yaoundé	26	9	7	10	32	26	+6	34
10	Université	26	8	8	10	23	25	−2	32
11	Sable	26	7	11	8	25	29	−4	32
12	Aigle Royal Menoua (R)	26	7	9	10	19	24	−5	30
13	Danay (R)	26	5	5	16	17	39	−22	20
14	Mount Cameroon (R)	26	5	7	14	23	40	−17	19 (Note: 3 points deducted.)

Source: rsssf.com
(C) Champions; (R) Relegated
