= 2024–25 Elite One =

Elite One
- Season: 2024–25

The 2024–25 Elite One is a season of the Elite One, the top-tier football league in Cameroon. It commenced on 7 December 2024 and is scheduled to conclude on 28 May 2025.

== Teams ==
Locations of the 2024–25 Elite One teams

Sixteen teams competed in the league, Victoria United FC were the defending champions, having won their first ever title in the previous season.

Note: Table lists in alphabetical order.

| Team | Location | Stadium | Capacity |
|---|---|---|---|
| Aigle Royal de Mungo | Melong | Stade Melong | 1,500 |
| Bamboutos | Mbouda | Stade de Mbouda | 12,000 |
| Canon Yaoundé | Yaoundé | Stade Ahmadou Ahidjo | 42,500 |
| Colombe Sportive | Yaoundé | Stade Annexe 1 Omnisport | 2,000 |
| Coton Sport | Garoua | Roumdé Adjia Stadium | 30,000 |
| Dynamo de Douala | Douala | Stade de la Réunification | 39,000 |
| Fauve Azur Elite | Yaoundé | Stade de Ngoa Ekélé | 5,000 |
| Fortuna | Yaoundé | Stade Militaire | 5,000 |
| Gazelle | Garoua | Stade Omnisports Roumdé Adjia | 22,000 |
| Les Astres | Douala | Stade de la Réunification | 39,000 |
| Panthère du Ndé | Bangangte | Stade Municipal de Bangangté | 2,000 |
| PWD Bamenda | Bamenda | Bamenda Municipal Stadium | 5,000 |
| Stade Renard de Melong | Melong | Stade Melong | 1,500 |
| Union Douala | Douala | Stade de la Réunification | 39,000 |
| Victoria United | Limbé | Limbe Stadium | 20,000 |
| Yong Sports Academy | Bamenda | Bamenda Municipal Stadium | 5,000 |

== League table ==
| Pos | Team | Pld | W | D | L | GF | GA | GD | Pts | Qualification or relegation |
|---|---|---|---|---|---|---|---|---|---|---|
| 1 | Colombe Sportive (C, Q) | 30 | 19 | 8 | 3 | 41 | 15 | +26 | 65 | Qualification to the 2025–26 CAF Champions League |
| 2 | Panthère du Ndé | 30 | 16 | 7 | 7 | 36 | 23 | +13 | 55 | |
| 3 | Gazelle | 30 | 15 | 8 | 7 | 52 | 32 | +20 | 53 | |
| 4 | Coton Sport | 30 | 14 | 10 | 6 | 40 | 29 | +11 | 52 | |
| 5 | Stade Renard | 30 | 13 | 7 | 10 | 36 | 27 | +9 | 46 | |
| 6 | Victoria United | 30 | 12 | 6 | 12 | 46 | 49 | −3 | 42 | |
| 7 | Canon Yaoundé | 30 | 11 | 8 | 11 | 35 | 30 | +5 | 41 | |
| 8 | Fauve Azur Elite | 30 | 11 | 6 | 13 | 29 | 27 | +2 | 39 | |
| 9 | PWD Bamenda | 30 | 8 | 15 | 7 | 33 | 31 | +2 | 39 | |
| 10 | Aigle Royal de Mungo | 30 | 11 | 6 | 13 | 30 | 30 | 0 | 39 | |
| 11 | Dynamo de Douala | 30 | 10 | 8 | 12 | 31 | 33 | −2 | 38 | |
| 12 | Fortuna | 30 | 10 | 7 | 13 | 35 | 36 | −1 | 37 | |
| 13 | Bamboutos (R) | 30 | 10 | 9 | 11 | 27 | 29 | −2 | 36 (Note: Bamboutos were deducted Three points.) | Relegation to Elite Two |
| 14 | Les Astres (R) | 30 | 10 | 5 | 15 | 31 | 42 | −11 | 35 | Relegation to Elite Two |
| 15 | Union Douala (R) | 30 | 5 | 7 | 18 | 17 | 46 | −29 | 22 | Relegation to Elite Two |
| 16 | Yong Sports Academy* (R) | 30 | 3 | 7 | 20 | 15 | 55 | −40 | 16 | Relegation to Elite Two |

Source: Soccerway
Rules for classification: 1) points; 2) goal difference; 3) number of goals scored.
(C) Champions; (Q) Qualified for the phase indicated; (R) Relegated
Notes:
- Yong Sports Academy Relegated to North West Regional League After Forfeiting Matches.

== Results ==
| Home \ Away | AIG | BAM | CAN | COL | COT | DYN | FAU | FOR | GAZ | LES | PAN | PWD | STA | UNI | VIC | YOU |
|---|---|---|---|---|---|---|---|---|---|---|---|---|---|---|---|---|
| Aigle Royal de Mungo | — | 2–1 | 2–0 | 0–1 | 2–3 | 1–0 | 2–0 | 1–0 | 1–3 | 0–1 | 0–1 | | 1–0 | 1–1 | | 0–0 |
| Bamboutos | 2–0 | — | 0–2 | 0–3 | 1–1 | 0–1 | 0–0 | 1–0 | 1–0 | 0–0 | 2–0 | 0–0 | 0–2 | | 5–1 | 0–1 |
| Canon Yaoundé | 1–3 | 2–0 | — | 1–2 | 1–1 | 0–2 | 1–0 | 0–1 | 0–1 | 0–0 | 1–1 | 1–1 | 1–1 | | 1–1 | 2–0 |
| Colombe | 2–1 | 2–1 | 0–1 | — | 2–0 | 2–1 | 3–2 | 1–1 | 1–1 | 1–0 | 3–0 | | 1–0 | 2–0 | 3–0 | 1–0 |
| Coton Sport | 2–1 | 4–1 | 2–1 | 0–0 | — | 2–1 | 1–0 | 2–1 | 1–1 | 1–1 | | 0–2 | 2–0 | 1–0 | 3–0 | 3–0 |
| Dynamo de Douala | 3–0 | 0–0 | 2–0 | 0–2 | 0–1 | — | 0–0 | 0–0 | 2–3 | 1–0 | 0–0 | 1–0 | 0–2 | 1–0 | 4–2 | 1–0 |
| Fauve Azur Elite | 1–2 | 3–0 | 1–3 | | 0–0 | 4–0 | — | | | 1–0 | 0–1 | 0–0 | 1–0 | 2–1 | 2–1 | 2–0 |
| Fortuna | 1–0 | 1–1 | 2–2 | 1–2 | 1–0 | | 0–1 | — | 2–3 | 0–2 | 1–2 | 3–1 | 0–1 | 2–0 | 5–0 | 2–1 |
| Gazelle | 1–1 | 1–2 | 0–0 | 0–0 | 3–3 | | 2–0 | 1–2 | — | 1–0 | 2–1 | | 0–2 | 3–0 | 3–0 | 3–1 |
| Les Astres | 0–2 | | 2–0 | 0–1 | 0–0 | 2–1* | 1–0 | 1–2 | 1–0 | — | 2–1 | 1–1 | 4–1 | 1–1 | | |
| Panthère du Ndé | 1–0 | 2–0 | 0–0 | | 0–0 | 1–0 | 0–2 | 2–0 | 2–1 | 4–1 | — | 0–1 | 1–0 | 2–1 | 1–1 | 1–1 |
| PWD Bamenda | 1–1 | 1–1 | 1–0 | | 0–0 | 2–1 | 1–2 | 0–0 | 0–4 | 4–0 | 2–2 | — | 3–3 | 0–0 | 1–3 | 0–0 |
| Stade Renard | 0–0 | 0–1 | 1–1 | 0–1 | 3–0 | 1–1 | 1–1 | 1–0 | 0–2 | 3–0 | 1–1 | 2–0 | — | 1–0 | | 2–1 |
| Union Douala | 0–1 | 1–0 | | 0–1 | 0–2 | 1–0 | 1–0 | 0–0 | 0–3 | 4–3 | 0–0 | 0–0 | 0–2 | — | 1–2 | 3–1 |
| Victoria United | 1–0 | 0–1 | 2–0 | 0–1 | 0–2 | 1–1 | 1–0 | 0–0 | 3–3 | 4–0 | 0–4 | 2–0 | 1–1 | | — | 3–0 |
| Yong Sports Academy | | 0–0 | 0–3 | 1–1 | 0–2 | 1–1 | 0–3 | 2–0 | 1–4 | 1–3 | 0–1 | 1–3 | | 1–1 | 2–1 | — |

Updated to match(es) played on 20 June 2025. Source: Soccerway
Legend: Blue = home team win; Yellow = draw; Red = away team win.
For upcoming matches, an "a" indicates there is an article about the rivalry between the two participants.
