= 1995 Cameroonian Premier League =

Cameroonian Premier League
- Champions: Racing Bafoussam
- Relegated: Fogabe Yaoundé

In the 1995 Cameroonian Premier League season, 16 teams competed. Racing Bafoussam won the championship.

== League standings ==
Pos	Team	Pld	W	D	L	GF	GA	GD	Pts
1	Racing Bafoussam (C)	30	13	13	4	36	21	+15	52
2	Léopards Douala	30	12	12	6	24	13	+11	48
3	Unisport Bafang	28	12	12	4	30	25	+5	48
4	Prévoyance Yaoundé	30	9	16	5	30	21	+9	43
5	Cotonsport Garoua	30	10	11	9	35	28	+7	41
6	PWD Bamenda	30	10	11	9	22	28	−6	41
7	Union Douala	30	10	9	11	33	31	+2	39
8	Canon Yaoundé	30	9	12	9	19	23	−4	39
9	Stade Bandjoun	30	8	14	8	26	23	+3	38
10	Panthère Bangangté	30	9	11	10	18	24	−6	38
11	Vautour Dschang	30	10	7	13	23	31	−8	37
12	Aigle Nkongsamba	30	9	8	13	28	32	−4	35
13	Fovu Baham	30	7	13	10	24	25	−1	34
14	Tonnerre Yaoundé	30	7	13	10	28	30	−2	34
15	Ocean Kribi	30	6	13	11	20	26	−6	31
16	Fogabe Yaoundé	30	5	8	17	24	38	−14	21 (Note: 2 points deducted?)

Source: rsssf.com
(C) Champions
