= 1997 Cameroonian Premier League =

Cameroonian Premier League
- Champions: Cotonsport Garoua

In the 1997 Cameroonian Premier League season, 18 teams competed. Cotonsport Garoua won the championship.

== Teams ==
Relegated teams

- Océan Kribi
- Olympic Maroua

Promoted teams

- Olympic Mvolyé
- Avenir Douala
- Victoria United
- Union Abong-Mbang

== League table ==
Pos	Team	Pld	W	D	L	GF	GA	GD	Pts	Qualification or relegation
1	Cotonsport Garoua (C)	34	17	11	6	40	25	+15	62	Qualification for Champions League
2	Stade Bandjoun	34	16	12	6	33	21	+12	60	Qualification for CAF Cup
3	Union Douala	34	15	10	9	46	26	+20	55	Qualification for Cup Winners' Cup (Note: Union Douala are 1997 Cameroonian Cup winners.)
4	Léopards Douala	34	15	9	10	36	23	+13	54	
5	Olympic Mvolyé	34	13	10	11	36	38	−2	49	
6	PWD Bamenda	34	11	15	8	33	28	+5	48	
7	Tonnerre Yaoundé	34	13	9	12	31	30	+1	48	
8	Canon Yaoundé	34	10	17	7	27	20	+7	47	
9	Fovu Baham	34	13	8	13	44	42	+2	47	
10	Dynamo Douala	34	11	13	10	36	29	+7	46	
11	Kumbo Strikers	34	11	13	10	37	32	+5	46	
12	Racing Bafoussam	34	12	10	12	37	35	+2	46	
13	Panthère Bangangté	34	12	10	12	35	33	+2	46	
14	Unisport Bafang (R)	34	11	13	10	43	31	+12	46	Relegation to Second Level
15	Avenir Douala (R)	34	10	8	16	28	44	−16	38	Relegation to Second Level
16	Victoria United (R)	34	8	8	18	32	51	−19	32	Relegation to Second Level
17	Prévoyance Yaoundé (R)	34	7	11	16	23	41	−18	32	Relegation to Second Level
18	Union Abong-Mbang (R)	34	4	7	23	20	68	−48	19	Relegation to Second Level

Source: rsssf.com
(C) Champions; (R) Relegated
