= 2002 Cameroonian Premier League =

Cameroonian Premier League
- Champions: Canon Yaoundé

In the 2002 Cameroonian Premier League season, 16 teams competed. Canon Yaoundé won the championship.

== League standings ==
| Pos | Team | Pld | W | D | L | GF | GA | GD | Pts |
|---|---|---|---|---|---|---|---|---|---|
| 1 | Canon Yaoundé (C) | 30 | 15 | 10 | 5 | 41 | 23 | +18 | 55 |
| 2 | Cotonsport Garoua | 30 | 14 | 11 | 5 | 37 | 20 | +17 | 53 |
| 3 | Bamboutos | 30 | 12 | 14 | 4 | 24 | 19 | +5 | 50 |
| 4 | Unisport Bafang | 30 | 10 | 14 | 6 | 37 | 24 | +13 | 44 |
| 5 | Tonnerre Yaoundé | 30 | 10 | 10 | 10 | 42 | 35 | +7 | 40 |
| 6 | Mount Cameroon | 30 | 8 | 15 | 7 | 28 | 24 | +4 | 39 |
| 7 | Union Douala | 30 | 9 | 11 | 10 | 23 | 29 | −6 | 38 |
| 8 | Sable | 30 | 7 | 16 | 7 | 23 | 22 | +1 | 37 |
| 9 | Racing Bafoussam | 30 | 9 | 10 | 11 | 21 | 21 | 0 | 37 |
| 10 | Fovu Baham | 30 | 9 | 10 | 11 | 21 | 28 | −7 | 37 |
| 11 | Stade Bandjoun | 30 | 9 | 10 | 11 | 23 | 32 | −9 | 37 |
| 12 | Cintra Yaoundé | 30 | 8 | 12 | 10 | 31 | 36 | −5 | 36 |
| 13 | Victoria United | 30 | 8 | 11 | 11 | 22 | 24 | −2 | 35 |
| 14 | Kumbo Strikers (R) | 30 | 7 | 11 | 12 | 20 | 31 | −11 | 32 |
| 15 | La Mairie Yaoundé (R) | 30 | 8 | 7 | 15 | 33 | 41 | −8 | 31 |
| 16 | Espérance (R) | 30 | 6 | 10 | 14 | 19 | 36 | −17 | 28 |

Source: rsssf.com
(C) Champions; (R) Relegated
