= 1998 Cameroonian Premier League =

Cameroonian Premier League
- Champions: Cotonsport Garoua

In the 1998 Cameroonian Premier League season, 16 teams competed. Cotonsport Garoua won the championship.

== League standings ==
Pos	Team	Pld	W	D	L	GF	GA	GD	Pts
1	Cotonsport Garoua (C)	30	16	6	8	46	26	+20	54
2	Canon Yaoundé	30	15	8	7	36	19	+17	53
3	Tonnerre Yaoundé	30	13	12	5	39	27	+12	51
4	Dynamo Douala	30	15	5	10	31	26	+5	50
5	Union Douala	30	13	10	7	35	21	+14	49
6	Olympic Mvolyé	30	12	9	9	41	35	+6	45
7	Port Douala	30	13	6	11	32	33	−1	45
8	Kumbo Strikers	30	12	7	11	36	34	+2	43
9	Sable	30	12	7	11	27	31	−4	43
10	Racing Bafoussam	30	13	10	7	35	21	+14	42 (Note: 7 points deducted?)
11	Panthère Bangangté	30	11	8	11	26	29	−3	41
12	Stade Bandjoun	30	11	7	12	36	34	+2	40
13	Fovu Baham	30	9	6	15	32	32	0	33
14	Léopards Douala (R)	30	8	5	17	30	52	−22	29
15	PWD Bamenda (R)	30	7	5	18	21	46	−25	26
16	Djerem Berfoua (R)	30	6	4	20	29	55	−26	19 (Note: 3 points deducted?)

Source: rsssf.com
(C) Champions; (R) Relegated
