= 2005 Cameroonian Premier League =

Cameroonian Premier League
- Champions: Cotonsport Garoua

In the 2005 Cameroonian Premier League season, 18 teams competed. Cotonsport Garoua won the championship.

== League standings ==
Pos	Team	Pld	W	D	L	GF	GA	GD	Pts
1	Cotonsport Garoua (C)	34	20	11	3	47	18	+29	71
2	Aigle Royal Menoua	34	15	8	11	36	29	+7	53
3	Les Astres	34	14	9	11	47	41	+6	51
4	Fovu Baham	34	13	12	9	38	33	+5	51
5	Sahel	34	15	7	12	38	37	+1	50 (Note: 2 points deducted.)
6	FS d'Akonolinga	34	14	8	12	43	33	+10	50
7	Canon Yaoundé	34	13	12	9	38	29	+9	49
8	Sable	34	12	13	9	37	29	+8	49
9	Espérance	34	12	9	13	30	34	−4	45
10	Bamboutos	34	12	8	14	31	27	+4	44
11	Racing Bafoussam	34	11	11	12	23	30	−7	44
12	Kadji Sports Academy	34	12	7	15	45	52	−7	43
13	Union Douala (O)	34	11	8	15	43	43	0	41
14	Mount Cameroon (O)	34	9	14	11	27	27	0	41
15	PWD Bamenda (R)	34	9	13	12	22	37	−15	40
16	Tonnerre Yaoundé (R)	34	10	9	15	32	40	−8	38 (Note: 1 point deducted.)
17	Université (R)	34	7	12	15	23	40	−17	33
18	Unisport Bafang (R)	34	6	11	17	27	48	−21	29

Source: rsssf.com
(C) Champions; (O) Relegation playoff; (R) Relegated
