= 1989 Cameroonian Premier League =

Football competition

Cameroonian Premier League
- Champions: Racing Bafoussam

In the 1989 Cameroonian Premier League season, 16 teams competed. Racing Bafoussam won the championship.

== League standings ==
Pos	Team	Pld	W	D	L	GF	GA	GD	Pts	Qualification or relegation
1	Racing Bafoussam (C)	30	18	9	3	43	13	+30	45	League Champions, qualified for African Cup
2	Tonnerre Yaoundé	30	18	8	4	35	14	+21	44	Cameroonian Cup, qualified for Cup Winners' Cup
3	Prévoyance Yaoundé	30	11	14	5	35	23	+12	36	
4	Canon Yaoundé	30	12	9	9	34	27	+7	33	
5	Unisport Bafang	30	11	10	9	32	25	+7	32	
6	Diamant Yaoundé	30	10	12	8	33	27	+6	32	
7	Panthère Bangangté	30	12	6	12	25	30	−5	30	
8	Union Douala	30	10	11	9	40	35	+5	31	
9	Cammark Bamenda	30	12	4	14	29	31	−2	28	
10	PWD Kumba	30	10	10	10	19	24	−5	29 (Note: 1 point deducted?)	
11	Dynamo Douala	30	10	8	12	27	30	−3	28	
12	Colombe Sangmélima	30	9	11	10	22	27	−5	29	
13	Caïman Douala	30	9	9	12	36	42	−6	27	
14	Fédéral	30	7	12	11	26	32	−6	26	
15	Aigle Royal Menoua	30	3	13	14	20	34	−14	19	
16	Entente Ngaoundéré	30	2	6	22	20	62	−42	10	

Source: rsssf.com
(C) Champions
