= 1996 Cameroonian Premier League =

Cameroonian Premier League
- Champions: Unisport Bafang

In the 1996 Cameroonian Premier League season, 16 teams competed. Unisport Bafang won the championship.

== League standings ==
Pos	Team	Pts
1	Unisport Bafang (C)	56
2	Cotonsport Garoua	47
3	Canon Yaoundé	47
4	Stade Bandjoun	44
5	Tonnerre Yaoundé	44
6	Union Douala	43
7	Racing Bafoussam	43
8	Fovu Baham	41
9	Prévoyance Yaoundé	40
10	Léopards Douala	36
11	Dynamo Douala	30
12	PWD Bamenda	30
13	Kumbo Strikers	28
14	Panthère Bangangté	24
15	Ocean Kribi (R)	26
16	Olympic Maroua (W, R)	0

Source: rsssf.com
(C) Champions; (R) Relegated; (W) Withdrew
