= 1994 Cameroonian Premier League =

Cameroonian Premier League
- Champions: Aigle Nkongsamba

In the 1994 Cameroonian Premier League season, 16 teams competed. Aigle Nkongsamba won the championship.

== League standings ==
Pos	Team	Pld	W	D	L	GF	GA	GD	Pts
1	Aigle Nkongsamba (C)	30	17	8	5	45	26	+19	42
2	Cotonsport Garoua	30	16	6	8	44	23	+21	38
3	Union Douala	30	12	12	6	38	28	+10	36
4	Prévoyance Yaoundé	30	10	15	5	34	22	+12	35
5	Racing Bafoussam	30	11	13	6	38	24	+14	35
6	Unisport Bafang	30	12	11	7	39	25	+14	35
7	Canon Yaoundé	30	11	14	5	38	29	+9	34 (Note: 2 points deducted?)
8	Tonnerre Yaoundé	30	9	13	8	30	27	+3	31
9	Ocean Kribi	30	10	8	12	24	36	−12	28
10	Fovu Baham	30	7	14	9	23	24	−1	28
11	Vautour Dschang	30	8	11	11	28	34	−6	27
12	Panthère Bangangté	30	10	7	13	19	29	−10	27
13	Léopards Douala	30	7	11	12	23	25	−2	25
14	Caïman Douala (R)	30	9	9	12	27	43	−16	25
15	Abong Mbang (R)	30	5	9	16	24	41	−17	19
16	PWD Kumba (R)	30	3	5	22	21	69	−48	7 (Note: 4 points deducted?)

Source: rsssf.com
(C) Champions; (R) Relegated
