= 1993 Cameroonian Premier League =

Cameroonian Premier League
- Champions: Racing Bafoussam

In the 1993 Cameroonian Premier League season, 16 teams competed. Racing Bafoussam won the championship.

== League standings ==
| Pos | Team | Pld | Pts |
|---|---|---|---|
| 1 | Racing Bafoussam (C) | 30 | 44 |
| 2 | Unisport Bafang | 30 | 43 |
| 3 | Union Douala | 30 | 38 |
| 4 | Tonnerre Yaoundé | 30 | 36 |
| 5 | Panthère Bangangté | 30 | 30 |
| 6 | PWD Kumba | 30 | 29 |
| 7 | Caïman Douala | 30 | 29 |
| 8 | Prévoyance Yaoundé | 30 | 28 |
| 9 | Léopards Douala | 30 | 28 |
| 10 | Canon Yaoundé | 30 | 28 |
| 11 | Aigle Nkongsamba | 30 | 27 |
| 12 | Abong Mbang | 30 | 26 |
| 13 | Vautour Dschang | 30 | 26 |
| 14 | Colombe Sangmélima (R) | 30 | 25 |
| 15 | Maiscam Ngaoundéré (R) | 30 | 24 |
| 16 | Tiko United (R) | 30 | 19 |

Source: rsssf.com
(C) Champions; (R) Relegated
