= 2004 Cameroonian Premier League =

Cameroonian Premier League
- Champions: Cotonsport Garoua

The 2004 Cameroonian Premier League season in Cameroon was contested by 18 teams. This association football competition was won by Cotonsport Garoua.

== Group stage ==
=== Group A ===
Pos	Team	Pld	W	D	L	GF	GA	GD	Pts
1	Cotonsport Garoua	16	11	5	0	25	1	+24	38
2	Sable	16	6	6	4	14	9	+5	24
3	Fovu Baham	16	6	5	5	14	10	+4	23
4	Tonnerre Yaoundé	16	6	5	5	17	18	−1	23
5	Mount Cameroon	16	6	4	6	16	14	+2	22
6	Unisport Bafang	16	4	6	6	17	21	−4	18
7	Kadji Sports Academy	16	4	6	6	16	20	−4	18
8	Université	16	4	4	8	16	24	−8	16
9	Cintra Yaoundé	16	3	3	10	16	34	−18	12

Source: rsssf.com

=== Group B ===
Pos	Team	Pld	W	D	L	GF	GA	GD	Pts
1	Racing Bafoussam	16	9	3	4	16	8	+8	30
2	Bamboutos	16	7	5	4	18	10	+8	26
3	Canon Yaoundé	16	8	2	6	15	12	+3	26
4	Union Douala	16	6	5	5	19	18	+1	23
5	Botafogo Buéa	16	6	5	5	14	14	0	23
6	Victoria United	16	6	2	8	15	20	−5	20
7	Espérance	16	6	2	8	14	19	−5	20
8	PWD Bamenda	16	5	2	9	18	22	−4	17
9	Renaissance Ngoumou	16	3	6	7	14	20	−6	15

Source: rsssf.com

== Playoff ==
=== Championship Group ===
Pos	Team	Pld	W	D	L	GF	GA	GD	Pts
1	Cotonsport Garoua (C)	14	9	3	2	30	9	+21	30
2	Racing Bafoussam	14	8	4	2	18	6	+12	28
3	Union Douala	14	7	5	2	18	13	+5	26
4	Bamboutos	14	3	8	3	8	7	+1	17
5	Fovu Baham	14	3	4	7	9	18	−9	13
6	Sable	14	3	6	5	14	19	−5	12 (Note: 3 points deducted.)
7	Canon Yaoundé	14	2	5	7	4	17	−13	11
8	Tonnerre Yaoundé	14	2	3	9	10	22	−12	9

Source: rsssf.com
(C) Champions

=== Relegation Group ===
Pos	Team	Pld	W	D	L	GF	GA	GD	Pts
9	Mount Cameroon	14	5	6	3	18	11	+7	21
10	Unisport Bafang	14	6	3	5	15	12	+3	21
11	PWD Bamenda	14	6	3	5	17	20	−3	21
12	Kadji Sports Academy	14	6	2	6	23	17	+6	20
13	Université	14	6	2	6	13	15	−2	20
14	Espérance	14	6	2	6	15	18	−3	20
15	Victoria United	14	5	3	6	20	20	0	18
16	Botafogo Buéa	14	4	3	7	12	20	−8	15

Source: rsssf.com
