= 2007–08 Elite One =

Elite One
- Champions: Cotonsport Garoua

In the 2007–08 Elite One season, 16 teams competed. Cotonsport Garoua won the championship.

== League standings ==
| Pos | Team | Pld | W | D | L | GF | GA | GD | Pts |
|---|---|---|---|---|---|---|---|---|---|
| 1 | Cotonsport Garoua (C) | 30 | 16 | 10 | 4 | 42 | 16 | +26 | 58 |
| 2 | Canon Yaoundé | 30 | 15 | 6 | 9 | 30 | 21 | +9 | 51 |
| 3 | Union Douala | 30 | 11 | 12 | 7 | 28 | 20 | +8 | 45 |
| 4 | Les Astres | 30 | 12 | 8 | 10 | 29 | 27 | +2 | 44 |
| 5 | Fovu Baham | 30 | 10 | 13 | 7 | 28 | 22 | +6 | 43 |
| 6 | Unisport Bafang | 30 | 11 | 8 | 11 | 20 | 18 | +2 | 41 |
| 7 | Tiko United | 30 | 11 | 8 | 11 | 34 | 34 | 0 | 41 |
| 8 | Université | 30 | 10 | 10 | 10 | 20 | 23 | −3 | 40 |
| 9 | Aigle Royal Menoua | 30 | 10 | 8 | 12 | 20 | 24 | −4 | 38 |
| 10 | Mount Cameroon | 30 | 9 | 11 | 10 | 23 | 28 | −5 | 38 |
| 11 | Sable | 30 | 10 | 7 | 13 | 20 | 27 | −7 | 37 |
| 12 | FS d'Akonolinga (R) | 30 | 9 | 10 | 11 | 17 | 28 | −11 | 37 |
| 13 | Caïman Douala (R) | 30 | 9 | 9 | 12 | 30 | 29 | +1 | 36 |
| 14 | Espérance (R) | 30 | 8 | 11 | 11 | 24 | 27 | −3 | 35 |
| 15 | Tonnerre Yaoundé (R) | 30 | 7 | 10 | 13 | 26 | 30 | −4 | 31 |
| 16 | International Lion Ngoma d'Ebolowa (R) | 30 | 6 | 11 | 13 | 24 | 41 | −17 | 22 (Note: 7 points deducted.) |

Source: rsssf.com
(C) Champions; (R) Relegated
