= 1999 Cameroonian Premier League =

Cameroonian Premier League
- Champions: Sable

In the 1999 Cameroonian Premier League season, 16 teams competed. Sable won the championship.

== League standings ==
Pos	Team	Pld	W	D	L	GF	GA	GD	Pts
1	Sable (C)	30	16	10	4	38	23	+15	58
2	Cotonsport Garoua	30	14	14	2	47	16	+31	56
3	Racing Bafoussam	30	12	13	5	33	23	+10	49
4	Canon Yaoundé	30	13	9	8	42	25	+17	48
5	Union Douala	30	11	10	9	42	34	+8	43
6	Fovu Baham	30	9	16	5	30	23	+7	43
7	Panthère Bangangté	30	9	11	10	18	24	−6	38
8	Girondins Ngaoundéré	30	9	10	11	28	27	+1	37
9	Stade Bandjoun	30	8	13	9	24	23	+1	37
10	Port Douala	30	9	10	11	25	27	−2	37
11	Kumbo Strikers	30	10	6	14	25	36	−11	36
12	Olympic Mvolyé	30	9	8	13	32	46	−14	35
13	Tonnerre Yaoundé	30	9	7	14	34	46	−12	34
14	Dynamo Douala (R)	30	8	10	12	21	29	−8	34
15	Aigle Nkongsamba (R)	30	7	7	16	24	26	−2	28
16	Free Boys Bamenda (R)	30	4	12	14	22	50	−28	18 (Note: 6 points deducted?)

Source: rsssf.com
(C) Champions; (R) Relegated
