= 2000 Cameroonian Premier League =

Cameroonian Premier League
- Champions: Fovu Baham

In the 2000 Cameroonian Premier League season, 16 teams competed. Fovu Baham won the championship.

== League standings ==
| Pos | Team | Pld | W | D | L | GF | GA | GD | Pts |
|---|---|---|---|---|---|---|---|---|---|
| 1 | Fovu Baham (C) | 30 | 17 | 8 | 5 | 42 | 18 | +24 | 59 |
| 2 | Cotonsport Garoua | 30 | 15 | 8 | 7 | 41 | 19 | +22 | 53 |
| 3 | Union Douala | 29 | 13 | 8 | 8 | 34 | 23 | +11 | 51 (Note: 4 bonus points awarded?) |
| 4 | Sable | 30 | 11 | 12 | 7 | 39 | 26 | +13 | 45 |
| 5 | Tonnerre Yaoundé | 30 | 11 | 11 | 8 | 34 | 30 | +4 | 44 |
| 6 | Stade Bandjoun | 30 | 11 | 10 | 9 | 23 | 28 | −5 | 43 |
| 7 | Canon Yaoundé | 29 | 11 | 9 | 9 | 34 | 34 | 0 | 42 |
| 8 | Racing Bafoussam | 30 | 10 | 9 | 11 | 31 | 33 | −2 | 39 |
| 9 | Cintra Yaoundé | 30 | 9 | 12 | 9 | 28 | 31 | −3 | 39 |
| 10 | Espérance | 29 | 11 | 4 | 14 | 28 | 36 | −8 | 37 |
| 11 | Kumbo Strikers | 30 | 8 | 13 | 9 | 21 | 21 | 0 | 37 |
| 12 | Girondins Ngaoundéré | 30 | 9 | 8 | 13 | 27 | 35 | −8 | 35 |
| 13 | Olympic Mvolyé | 30 | 9 | 8 | 13 | 33 | 41 | −8 | 35 |
| 14 | Caïman Douala (R) | 30 | 9 | 7 | 14 | 31 | 30 | +1 | 34 |
| 15 | Port Douala (R) | 30 | 8 | 9 | 13 | 25 | 31 | −6 | 33 |
| 16 | Panthère Bangangté (R) | 29 | 4 | 8 | 17 | 13 | 34 | −21 | 20 |

Source: rsssf.com
(C) Champions; (R) Relegated
