= Michel Kaham =

Cameroonian footballer

Personal information
- Date of birth: 1 June 1951 (age 75)
- Place of birth: Bafang, Cameroon
- Height: 1.77 m (5 ft 10 in)
- Position: Defender

Senior career*
Years	Team	Apps	(Gls)
- Stade de Melong
- Aigle Nkongsamba
1973–1974	Canon Yaoundé		
1974–1978	Quimper		
1978–1980	Tours	62	(1)
1980–1981	Valenciennes	8	(0)
1981–1982	Quimper	16	(0)
1982–1985	Cleveland Force (indoor)	74	(3)
1985–1986	Kansas City Comets (indoor)	7	(0)
1986–1987	Toledo Pride (indoor)		

International career
1972–1982	Cameroon	13	(0)

Managerial career
- Diamant Yaoundé
- Olympic Mvolyé
- Unisport Bafang
- KSA de Douala
Medal record
Men's football
Representing Cameroon
Africa Cup of Nations
Third place	1972 Cameroon
- * Club domestic league appearances and goals

Michel Kaham (born 1 June 1951 in Bafang) is a retired Cameroonian professional footballer. He was Cameroon's right-back at the 1982 FIFA World Cup, where he played in all three of the squad's matches.

Kaham is currently an assistant manager of the national team.

== Honours ==
=== Player ===
Aigle Nkongsamba

- Elite One: 1971

Canon Yaoundé

- Elite One: 1974

Cameroon

- African Cup of Nations: 3rd place, 1972

=== Manager ===
Olympic Mvolyé

- Cameroonian Cup: 1992
