= Bienvenue Nnengue =

Cameroonian footballer

Nnengue Bienvenue
Personal information
- Full name: Bienvenue Dieudonne Nnengue
- Date of birth: July 19, 1984 (age 42)
- Place of birth: Yaoundé, Cameroon
- Height: 1.75 m (5 ft 9 in)
- Position: Striker

Youth career
- 2000–2001: Otele Football
- 2001–2002: Vogt Athletic

Senior career*
Years	Team	Apps	(Gls)
2002–2004	Likie FC		
2004–2005	Tonnerre Yaoundé		
2005–2006	Renaissance de Ngoumou		
2006–2008	Tiko United		
2008–2009	PSIS Semarang	??	(2)
2009–2010	PSBI Blitar	20	(5)
2010–2012	Barito Putera	35	(13)
2013	PSCS Cilacap	1	(0)
- * Club domestic league appearances and goals as of September 2013

Bienvenue Dieudonne Nnengue or Bienvenue Nnengue or Nnengue Bienvenue, (born July 19, 1984 in Yaoundé, Cameroon) is a Cameroonian former footballer who plays as a striker.

== Career ==
=== Cameroon ===
He started his football in the youth team in Otélé named Otele Football at the 2000–01 season. In 2001–02 season he moved to Vogt Athletic.

From 2002 to 2004 he played for Championnat Régional du Centre football club as Likie FC.

In 2004 season he moved to Cameroonian Premier League club Tonnerre Yaoundé and in the next season he move to Renaissance de Ngoumou.

From 2006 season to 2007-08 season he played for Tiko United before he moved to the Indonesia football competition in 2008–09 season.

=== Indonesia ===
He started his career in Indonesia with played for PSIS Semarang in 2008-09 Indonesia Super League.

In 2009-10 season he moved to play for PSBI Blitar where he scored 5 goals for the club.

Start from 2010-11 season he currently played for Barito Putera last season he scored 7 goals from 20 appearance. This season he play 15 appearance with 6 goals for the club.
