= 1991 Cameroonian Premier League =

Cameroonian Premier League
- Champions: Canon Yaoundé

In the 1991 Cameroonian Premier League season, 16 teams competed. Canon Yaoundé won the championship.

== Overview ==
It was contested by 16 teams, and Canon Yaoundé won the championship.

== League standings ==
| Pos | Team | Pld | W | D | L | GF | GA | GD | Pts |
|---|---|---|---|---|---|---|---|---|---|
| 1 | Canon Yaoundé (C) | 29 | 14 | 15 | 0 | 36 | 14 | +22 | 43 |
| 2 | Diamant Yaoundé | 29 | 13 | 8 | 8 | 33 | 22 | +11 | 34 |
| 3 | Racing Bafoussam | 29 | 12 | 8 | 9 | 41 | 27 | +14 | 32 |
| 4 | Union Douala | 29 | 11 | 9 | 9 | 33 | 22 | +11 | 31 |
| 5 | Tonnerre Yaoundé | 29 | 10 | 10 | 9 | 23 | 24 | −1 | 30 |
| 6 | Panthère Bangangté | 29 | 10 | 9 | 10 | 17 | 16 | +1 | 29 |
| 7 | Unisport Bafang | 29 | 8 | 12 | 9 | 27 | 28 | −1 | 28 |
| 8 | Léopards Douala | 29 | 8 | 10 | 11 | 27 | 38 | −11 | 26 |
| 9 | Caïman Douala | 29 | 9 | 8 | 12 | 26 | 32 | −6 | 26 |
| 10 | Colombe Sangmélima | 29 | 7 | 12 | 10 | 18 | 25 | −7 | 26 |
| 11 | Maiscam Ngaoundéré | 29 | 7 | 11 | 11 | 14 | 19 | −5 | 25 |
| 12 | PWD Kumba | 29 | 7 | 10 | 12 | 23 | 36 | −13 | 24 |
| 13 | Unite Douala | 29 | 7 | 10 | 12 | 19 | 26 | −7 | 24 |
| 14 | Cammark Bamenda | 29 | 4 | 14 | 11 | 23 | 34 | −11 | 24 (Note: 2 bonus points awarded?) |
| 15 | Abong Mbang | 29 | 4 | 14 | 11 | 22 | 30 | −8 | 22 |
| 16 | Prévoyance Yaoundé (W) | 0 | – | – | – | – | – | — | 0 |

Source: rsssf.com
(C) Champions; (W) Withdrew
