= 2001 Cameroonian Premier League =

Cameroonian Premier League
- Champions: Cotonsport Garoua

In the 2001 Cameroonian Premier League season, 16 teams competed. Cotonsport Garoua won the championship.

== League standings ==
Pos	Team	Pld	W	D	L	GF	GA	GD	Pts
1	Cotonsport Garoua (C)	30	19	4	7	46	19	+27	61
2	Tonnerre Yaoundé	30	15	8	7	43	23	+20	53
3	Fovu Baham	30	13	11	6	37	27	+10	50
4	Canon Yaoundé	30	15	4	11	39	35	+4	49
5	Sable FC	30	11	13	6	26	22	+4	46
6	Mount Cameroon	29	13	5	11	34	31	+3	44
7	Union Douala	30	10	10	10	30	29	+1	39 (Note: 1 points deducted.)
8	Kumbo Strikers	30	10	9	11	20	19	+1	39
9	Racing Bafoussam	30	10	9	11	21	32	−11	39
10	Unisport Bafang	29	11	8	10	26	28	−2	38 (Note: 3 points deducted.)
11	Stade Bandjoun	30	10	8	12	30	41	−11	38
12	Espérance	30	10	7	13	32	38	−6	37
13	Cintra Yaoundé	30	8	10	12	29	32	−3	34
14	Olympic Mvolyé (R)	30	6	11	13	34	41	−7	29
15	Dynamo Douala (R)	29	8	5	16	25	30	−5	26
16	Girondins Ngaoundéré (R)	29	2	12	15	17	39	−22	18

Source: rsssf.com
(C) Champions; (R) Relegated
