= 1990 Cameroonian Premier League =

Cameroonian Premier League
- Champions: Union Douala

In the 1990 Cameroonian Premier League season, 16 teams competed. Union Douala won the championship.

== League standings ==
Pos	Team	Pld	W	D	L	GF	GA	GD	Pts
1	Union Douala (C)	30	17	8	5	43	24	+19	59
2	Prévoyance Yaoundé	30	13	8	9	37	29	+8	47
3	Panthère Bangangté	30	13	8	9	33	26	+7	47
4	Tonnerre Yaoundé	30	11	11	8	31	27	+4	44
5	Canon Yaoundé	30	11	10	9	37	26	+11	43
6	Diamant Yaoundé	30	10	11	9	34	25	+9	41
7	Racing Bafoussam	30	10	10	10	28	25	+3	40
8	Unisport Bafang	30	8	14	8	25	27	−2	38
9	Cammark Bamenda	30	8	13	9	26	30	−4	37
10	Colombe Sangmélima	30	7	15	8	20	22	−2	36
11	Caïman Douala	30	9	9	12	33	31	+2	36
12	Unite Douala	30	8	13	9	20	24	−4	36 (Note: 1 point deducted?)
13	PWD Kumba	30	10	5	15	24	41	−17	35
14	Dynamo Douala (R)	30	6	15	9	23	33	−10	33
15	Aigle Royal Menoua (R)	30	7	11	12	20	29	−9	32
16	Elecsport Limbé (R)	30	6	10	14	28	35	−7	28

Source: rsssf.com
(C) Champions; (R) Relegated
