= Lamine N'Diaye =

Senegalese footballer and manager

Personal information
- Date of birth: 18 October 1956 (age 70)
- Place of birth: Thiès, Senegal
- Height: 1.78 m (5 ft 10 in)
- Position: Midfielder

Team information
- Current team: USM Alger (manager)

Senior career*
Years	Team	Apps	(Gls)
1976–1980	US Rail		
1980–1983	SC Orange	55	(38)
1983–1985	Cannes	49	(21)
1985–1993	Mulhouse	239	(39)
Total		343	(98)

International career
1982–1992	Senegal		

Managerial career
- 1998: Mulhouse
- 2000–2006: Coton Sport
- 2008: Senegal
- 2008–2009: Maghreb Fez
- 2010–2013: TP Mazembe
- 2014: CS Don Bosco (technical director)
- 2014–2016: AC Léopards
- 2018–2019: Al-Hilal
- 2019–2022: Horoya AC
- 2023–2026: TP Mazembe
- 2026–: USM Alger
- * Club domestic league appearances and goals

Lamine N'Diaye (born 18 October 1956) is a Senegalese football coach and former player who is the manager of Algerian club USM Alger.

== Playing career ==
Born in Thiès, N'Diaye played as a midfielder for US Rail, SC Orange, Cannes and Mulhouse, and also represented the Senegalese national side at international level.

== Coaching career ==
N'Diaye briefly managed Mulhouse in 1998. N'Diaye later managed Cameroonian club side Coton Sport from 2003 to 2006. N'Diaye became coach of the Senegal national team in January 2008, following the resignation of Henryk Kasperczak. He was fired from his position as manager in October 2008. N'Diaye was appointed manager of Moroccan side Maghreb Fez in December 2008, before becoming manager of TP Mazembe in September 2010. He became technical director of TP Mazembe in May 2013. In December 2014, he was appointed manager of AC Léopards. By July 2018, he was manager of Sudanese club Al-Hilal. In November 2019, he became manager of Guinean club Horoya AC. He returned to TP Mazembe in 2023, winning the league title in 2023–24 and reaching the semi-final of the CAF Champions League, before departing in January 2026.

=== USM Alger ===
On 20 February 2026 N'Diaye was announced as the head coach of Algerian club USM Alger, signing a contract until the end of the season, with an option to renew depending on results. He led his team to victory in the 2025–26 Algerian Cup, defeating CR Belouizdad 2–1 in the final at the Nelson Mandela Stadium, securing his first trophy in charge. On 16 May 2026, N'Diaye led USM Alger to victory in the 2025–26 CAF Confederation Cup, defeating Zamalek 8–7 on penalties in Cairo after a 1–0 defeat in the second leg, resulting in a 1–1 aggregate draw. The victory secured the club's second CAF Confederation Cup title, following its 2023 triumph. Following the match, N'Diaye described his team's triumph as "deserved".

On 27 June 2026, N'Diaye extended his contract with USM Alger for two additional seasons. On 8 November 2026, N'Diaye led USM Alger to victory in the 2026 CAF Super Cup, defeating Mamelodi Sundowns 3–1 in Pretoria, South Africa. The victory secured the club's fourth continental title.

== Honours ==
=== Manager ===
Coton Sport FC de Garoua

- Elite One: 2001, 2003, 2004, 2005, 2006
- Cameroonian Cup: 2003, 2004

TP Mazembe

- Linafoot: 2011, 2012, 2023–24
- CAF Champions League: 2010
- CAF Super Cup: 2010, 2011
- FIFA Club World Cup: Runner-up: 2010

AC Léopards

- Congo Ligue 1: 2015

Al-Hilal

- Sudan Premier League: 2018

Horoya AC

- Guinée Championnat National: 2020, 2021, 2022

USM Alger

- Algerian Cup: 2025–26
- CAF Confederation Cup: 2025–26
- CAF Super Cup: 2026
