= 1986 Cameroonian Premier League =

Cameroonian Premier League
- Champions: Canon Yaoundé

In the 1986 Cameroonian Premier League season, 16 teams competed. Canon Yaoundé won the championship defeating Union Douala.

== League standings ==
| Pos | Team | Pld | Pts |
|---|---|---|---|
| 1 | Canon Yaoundé | 30 | 39 |
| 2 | Union Douala | 30 | 34 |
| 3 | Cammark Bamenda | 30 | 34 |
| 4 | Federal Foumban | 30 | 33 |
| 5 | Lions Yaounde | 30 | 32 |
| 6 | Unisport Bafang | 30 | 32 |
| 7 | PWD Bamenda | 30 | 30 |
| 8 | Tonnerre Yaoundé | 30 | 30 |
| 9 | Dynamo Douala | 30 | 29 |
| 10 | Etoile Filante Garoua | 30 | 28 |
| 11 | Entente Ngaoundere | 30 | 27 |
| 12 | Panthère Bangangté | 30 | 27 |
| 13 | Racing Bafoussam | 30 | 27 |
| 14 | Rail Douala | 30 | 26 |
| 15 | Unite Douala | 30 | 24 |
| 16 | Kohi Sport Maroua | 30 | 20 |

Source: rsssf.com
