= 2006 Cameroonian Premier League =

Cameroonian Premier League
- Champions: Cotonsport Garoua

In the 2006 Cameroonian Premier League season, 16 teams competed. Cotonsport Garoua won the championship.

== League standings ==
Pos	Team	Pld	W	D	L	GF	GA	GD	Pts
1	Cotonsport Garoua (C)	30	14	11	5	50	22	+28	53
2	Canon Yaoundé	30	12	13	5	36	21	+15	49
3	Les Astres	30	11	14	5	36	24	+12	47
4	Fovu Baham	30	10	15	5	29	17	+12	45
5	Espérance	30	11	8	11	28	30	−2	41
6	Aigle Royal Menoua	30	9	13	8	28	35	−7	40
7	FS d'Akonolinga	30	9	12	9	27	29	−2	39
8	Sable	30	8	14	8	27	26	+1	38
9	Sahel	30	9	11	10	34	39	−5	38
10	Bamboutos	30	8	14	8	26	28	−2	38
11	Mount Cameroon	30	7	17	6	28	32	−4	38
12	Union Douala	30	8	13	9	23	22	+1	37
13	Fédéral Noun	30	8	13	9	29	39	−10	37
14	Impôts (R)	30	9	9	12	36	36	0	35 (Note: 1 point deducted)
15	Racing Bafoussam (R)	30	5	12	13	23	32	−9	27
16	Kadji Sports Academy (R)	30	4	7	19	16	44	−28	19

Source: rsssf.com
(C) Champions; (R) Relegated
