= Patrice Nzekou =

Cameroonian footballer

Personal information
- Full name: Patrice Nzekou Nguenheu
- Date of birth: 22 June 1983 (age 43)
- Place of birth: Kumbo, Cameroon
- Height: 1.77 m (5 ft 9 1/2 in)
- Position: Midfielder

Senior career*
Years	Team	Apps	(Gls)
2000–2002	Bursaspor	20	(0)
2002–2003	Kocaelispor	32	(0)
2003–2004	Racing Bafoussam	23	(2)
2004–2006	Cotonsport Garoua	23	(1)
2006–2008	Union Douala	30	(4)
2008–2010	Kocaelispor	48	(1)
2010–2012	PSPS Pekanbaru	50	(12)
2012–2013	Persiba Balikpapan	34	(4)
2013–2014	Bhayangkara F.C.	16	(2)
2014	Persiba Balikpapan	17	(2)
- * Club domestic league appearances and goals as of 00:25, 8 December 2014 (UTC)

Patrice Nzekou Nguenheu (born 22 June 1983 in Kumba, Southwest Province, Cameroon) is a Cameroonian former footballer who plays as a midfielder. Nzekou last played for Persiba Balikpapan in the 2014 Indonesia Super League.

== Honours ==
=== Club honors ===
Cotonsport Garoua

- Cameroonian Championship (2): 2005, 2006
