= 1983 Cameroonian Premier League =

Cameroonian Premier League
- Champions: Tonnerre Yaoundé

In the 1983 Cameroonian Premier League season, 16 teams competed. Tonnerre Yaoundé won the championship.

== League standings ==
Pos	Team	Pld	W	D	L	GF	GA	GD	Pts
1	Tonnerre Yaoundé	30	19	11	0	61	13	+48	49
2	Etoile Filante Garoua	30	13	11	6	47	31	+16	37
3	Dynamo Douala	30	7	18	5	32	23	+9	32
4	Unisport Bafang	30	9	13	8	19	18	+1	31
5	Entente Ngaoundere	30	8	15	7	35	31	+4	31
6	Canon Yaoundé	30	10	10	10	39	36	+3	30
7	PWD Bamenda	30	10	10	10	29	32	−3	30
8	Union Douala	30	8	14	8	35	39	−4	30
9	FS Akonolinga	30	10	10	10	32	38	−6	30
10	Dragon Douala	30	9	11	10	30	35	−5	29
11	Dihep Di Nkam	30	7	14	9	26	47	−21	28
12	Federal Foumban	30	8	11	11	28	37	−9	27
13	Kohi Sport Maroua	30	8	11	11	28	44	−16	27
14	Lions Yaounde	30	8	10	12	29	43	−14	26
15	Léopards Douala	30	9	6	15	35	44	−9	24
16	Bamb Mbida	30	5	10	15	19	39	−20	20

Source: rsssf.com
