= 1961 Cameroonian Premier League =

Cameroonian Premier League
- Champions: Oryx Douala

11 teams competed in the 1960 or 1961 season of the Cameroonian Premier League. Oryx Douala won the championship.

== Participants ==
- Union Yaoundé
- Diamant Yaoundé
- Dragon Yaoundé
- Caiman Douala
- Vent Lolanne Douala
- Oryx Douala
- Aigle Nkongsamba
- Aigle Dchang
- Etoile Abong-Nbang
- Epervier Ebolowa
- Colombe anmélima
