= Aloys Kwaakum =

Cameroonian footballer

Personal information
- Full name: Kwaakum Aloys Amuam
- Date of birth: 9 September 1987 (age 39)
- Place of birth: Lier, Belgium
- Height: 1.74 m (5 ft 8 1/2 in)
- Positions: Right back; defensive midfielder

Youth career
- 1997–2002: l'École de Football des Brasseries du Cameroun

Senior career*
Years	Team	Apps	(Gls)
2004–2006	PWD Bamenda	38	(8)
2006–2007	Racing Club Bafoussam	18	(2)
2007–2008	K. Lyra T.S.V.	12	(3)
2008–2013	Lierse S.K.	26	(3)
2013–2015	Union Sportive De Douala	27	(1)
- * Club domestic league appearances and goals as of 5 July 2014

Aloys Kwaakum (born 9 September 1987) is a Cameroonian football player who is currently out of contract after being released by Belgian 1st division side Lierse.

Kwaakum is a versatile right-sided midfielder or defender. He began his career at the youth level with the Ecole de Futbol Brasseries de Cameroun before playing three seasons in the Cameroonian first division with PWD Bamenda and then Racing Club Bafoussam. After featuring in a youth tournament in Toulouse, France, he was eventually taken to Belgium in 2007. He played one season with TSV Lyra before attracting the attention of Belgian Pro League team Lierse S.K. During his time with Lierse, he trialled with several other Belgian clubs, but despite his interest, he chose to see out his contract at Lierse.
