= Hans Eric Ekounga =

Cameroonian footballer

Hans Ekounga
Personal information
- Full name: Hans Eric Ekounga
- Date of birth: 24 February 1977 (age 49)
- Height: 1.78 m (5 ft 10 in)
- Position: Forward

Senior career*
Years	Team	Apps	(Gls)
1998	Dynamo Douala		
1998–1999	FC Chernomorets Novorossiysk	18	(4)
2002	Coton Sport		
2003	Canon Yaoundé		
2003	Lokeren	5	(0)
2004	Vilvoorde FC	8	(3)
2004–2007	Olympique Alès		
2007–2012	Béziers		
- * Club domestic league appearances and goals

Hans Eric Ekounga (born 24 February 1977) is a former Cameroonian football player. In some sources his birth year is listed as 1981, which would make him 17 years old at the time of his debut in the Russian Football Premier League.

Ekounga began playing football with Océan de Kribi before joining Dynamo de Douala. He was the leading goal-scorer in the 2002 Cameroonian Premier League with Coton Sport FC de Garoua, prompting a move to Canon Yaoundé in 2003, and ultimately to Belgian First Division side Sporting Lokeren later that year.
