= Sable FC =

Sable FC may refer to:

- Sable FC (Cameroon), a Cameroonian football club
- Sablé FC (France), a French football club
