= 1987 Cameroonian Premier League =

Cameroonian Premier League
- Champions: Tonnerre Yaoundé

Statistics of the 1987 Cameroonian Premier League season.

== Overview ==
It was contested by 16 teams, and Tonnerre Yaoundé won the championship.
