= 1988 Cameroonian Premier League =

Cameroonian Premier League
- Champions: Tonnerre Yaoundé

Statistics of the 1988 Cameroonian Premier League season.

== Overview ==
Tonnerre Yaoundé won the championship.
