= 1962 Cameroonian Premier League =

Cameroonian Premier League
- Champions: Caïman Douala

Statistics of the 1962 Cameroonian Premier League season.

== Overview ==
Caïman Douala won the championship.
