= 1963 Cameroonian Premier League =

Cameroonian Premier League
- Champions: Oryx Douala

Statistics of the 1963 Cameroonian Premier League season.

== Overview ==
Oryx Douala won the championship.
