= 1972 Cameroonian Premier League =

Cameroonian Premier League
- Champions: Léopards Douala

Statistics of the 1972 Cameroonian Premier League season.

== Overview ==
Léopards Douala won the championship.
