= 1992 Cameroonian Premier League =

Cameroonian Premier League
- Champions: Racing Bafoussam

Statistics of the 1992 Cameroonian Premier League season.

== Overview ==
Racing Bafoussam won the championship.
