= Super Coupe Roger Milla =

- Founded: 1999
- Country: Cameroon
- Confederation: CAF
- Number of clubs: 2
- Current champions: Colombe Sportive (1st title) (2025)
- Most championships: Coton Sport (2 titles)
- Current: 2026 Super Coupe Roger Milla

The Super Coupe Roger Milla is a match competition in Cameroon football, played between the Cameroon Premiere Division champions and the Cameroon Cup winners.

== Finals ==
- 1999 : Sable FC (Batié) 1–0 Canon Yaoundé (Yaoundé)
- 2000 : Kumbo Strikers FC (Kumbo) 1–0 Fovu Club (Baham)
- 2001 : Fovu Club (Baham) 1–0 Coton Sport FC (Garoua)
- 2002 : Mount Cameroon FC (Buéa) 2–0 Canon Yaoundé (Yaoundé)
- 2019 : Stade Renard (Melong) 3–1 UMS de Loum (Loum)
- 2022 : Bamboutos (Mbouda) 1–0 Coton Sport FC (Garoua)
- 2023 : Coton Sport FC (Garoua) 2–0 Fovu Club (Baham)
- 2024 : Victoria United FC (Limbé) 1–2 Colombe Sportive (Sangmélima)
- 2025 : Colombe Sportive (Sangmélima) - Panthère Sportive du Ndé FC (Bangangté)

NB: in 2003 and 2004 Coton Sport FC won the league-and-cup double and apparently no Super Cup match was organised.
