= Eyong Enoh =

Cameroonian footballer (born 1986)

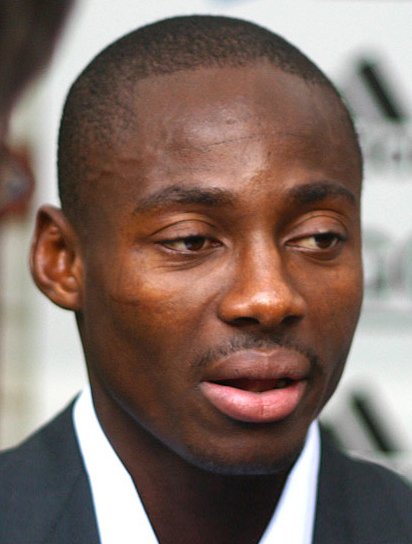
- Enoh in 2008

Personal information
- Full name: Eyong Tarkang Enoh
- Date of birth: 23 March 1986 (age 40)
- Place of birth: Kumba, Cameroon
- Height: 1.76 m (5 ft 9 in)
- Position: Defensive midfielder

Youth career
- 2002–2002: Université de Buéa
- 2002–2003: Little Foot FC

Senior career*
Years	Team	Apps	(Gls)
2003–2004	Mount Cameroon	18	(4)
2004–2005	Mağusa Türk Gücü	36	(1)
2005–2006	Türk Ocağı Limasol	0	(0)
2006–2008	Ajax Cape Town	36	(1)
2008–2014	Ajax	98	(3)
2013	→ Fulham (loan)	9	(0)
2013	Jong Ajax	9	(0)
2014	→ Antalyaspor (loan)	8	(0)
2014–2017	Standard Liège	54	(1)
2018	Willem II	5	(0)
2018–2019	Enosis Neon Paralimni	24	(1)
2019–2020	Olympiakos Nicosia	8	(0)
2021–2022	Ajax Amateurs	1	(0)
Total		306	(11)

International career
2009–2016	Cameroon	51	(2)
- * Club domestic league appearances and goals

Eyong Tarkang Enoh (born 23 March 1986) is a Cameroonian former professional footballer who played as a midfielder.

Enoh has played for clubs in eight countries, including spells in both Cyprus and Northern Cyprus, as well as the Netherlands, Belgium, England, Turkey, Cameroon and South Africa, having played for the likes of Ajax, Ajax Cape Town, Willem II, Standard Liège, Fulham, Antalyaspor, Mount Cameroon FC, Mağusa Türk Gücü, Enosis Neon Paralimni and Olympiakos Nicosia.

As a member of the Cameroon national team, he participated in the 2010 and 2014 editions of the FIFA World Cup as well as the 2010 and 2015 editions of the African Cup of Nations, reaching the quarter-finals of the former tournament.

The oldest 2 of his sons, Bashan Leon Enoh and Joseph Enoh are also footballers, currently playing on the U19 team of NEC Nijmegen

== Club career ==
=== Mount Cameroon FC ===
Raised in the Southwest Region of Cameroon, the son of a local government official, Enoh's football career began in the youth ranks of local club Little Foot FC from Tiko, where he played for five seasons. He was spotted by Mount Cameroon while playing for Little Foot in the 2001 Mini-Interpools and recruited to the Buea team that same 2001.. After five seasons playing for Little Foot FC, Enoh transferred to Mount Cameroon FC, a club from Buéa, for the 2003–2004 season, playing in the Cameroon Premiere Division, the top flight of football in his homeland. While at Little Foot he had been given the nickname Verón, after the Argentinean midfielder Juan Sebastián Verón, due to their similar playing style. He continued to bear the nickname in his new club and in the University of Buea where he had enrolled in the Faculty. It was during his period in Buéa, that he began playing for the Cameroon national football team's Cadet Lions, receiving his first caps for the national youth teams of Cameroon.

=== Mağusa Türk Gücü ===
Following his debut at the top flight in Cameroon, Enoh transferred to Mağusa Türk Gücü S.K., a club from the Occupied area from Turkey. He appeared in 36 matches and scored one goal for his new club, playing in the Kuzey Kıbrıs Süper Ligi. After just one season with the club however he transferred once more, this time to Türk Ocağı Limasol, remaining in Northern Cyprus. The transfer did not fare well with Enoh as he did not receive any playing time, and after six months terminated his contract with his new club.

=== Ajax Cape Town ===
Having returned to Cameroon after his less successful stint in Northern Cyprus, Enoh was signed to South African Ajax Cape Town in the summer of 2006, playing in the South African Premier Soccer League for the Cape club. In his first season in Cape Town, Enoh made a mere nine appearances during the regular season. A year he would also help Ajax Cape Town to win the ABSA Cup. While leaving a lasting impression after his first season, Enoh became a valuable player to Ajax CT the following season, when he was made team captain and was awarded the Ajax Cape Town Player of the Year award at the end of the 2007–2008 season.

In the summer of 2008, Enoh travelled to Europe for many trials in France, Denmark, Sweden and England but was not offered a contract. He was on the brink of signing with Maccabi Haifa from Israel but the two parties could not come to terms. Harry Redknapp made an attempt to sign the young midfielder to Portsmouth but Enoh could not get a work clearance on time to play in the U.K.

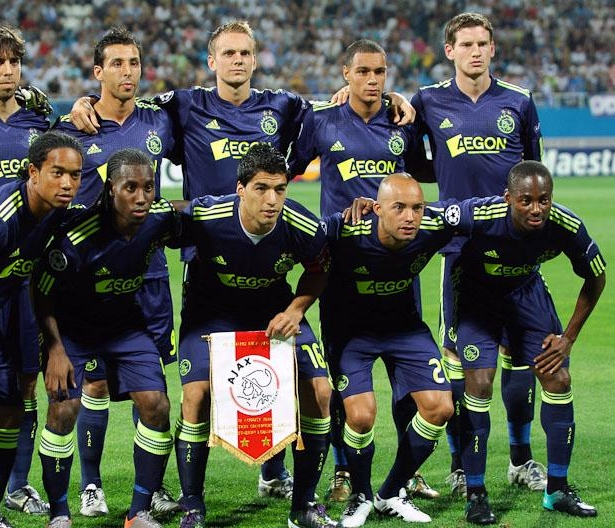
Enoh (bottom right) with Ajax teammates in 2010.

=== Ajax ===
In August 2008 he signed a contract at AFC Ajax Amsterdam until 30 June 2010 with a two-year option. Enoh was the first Cameroonian that ever played for Ajax. After making a stunning Eredivisie debut against Feyenoord on 21 September 2008, he quickly became a regular starter in Marco van Basten's team. He scored his first UEFA Cup goal against Olympique Marseille on 18 March 2009 in the Amsterdam ArenA and has become a popular figure with the fans for his workman-like performances. He was a regular starter under new manager Martin Jol. Enoh along with many other Ajax regulars spent a good portion of the 2011–12 season injured. He returned to the Ajax first team in an important 2–0 win against PSV Eindhoven, in which he scored. When Frank de Boer was appointed manager, Enoh had fewer starting opportunities, and was used more as a substitute player.

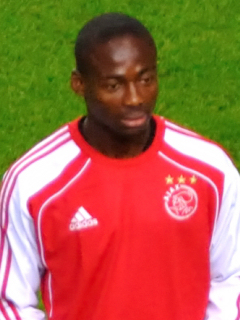
Enoh warming up for Ajax vs Olympique Lyonnais on 14 September 2011.

==== Fulham (loan) ====
Enoh signed for Premier League side Fulham on loan until the end of the season on 31 January 2013, with Fulham having the option to sign the player on a permanent deal. At Fulham, Enoh was rejoined with his former Ajax manager Martin Jol. He made his début for Fulham when he came on as a substitute in their 1–0 win over Tottenham Hotspur at White Hart Lane on 17 March 2013.

=== Return to Ajax ===
Following his loan spell at Fulham where he made 9 regular season appearances for the Cottagers, Enoh returned to Ajax on 11 July 2013 where he was given the number 26 shirt. Having lost his starting position at Ajax, and with Fulham opting not to purchase the defensive midfielder at the end of their season, Enoh was granted permission by Ajax to negotiate with other clubs, and weigh out alternative options, since his contract runs until mid-2015. Kasımpaşa and Olympiacos had been mentioned as clubs interested in signing the midfielder. Unable to secure a transfer however Enoh remained in Amsterdam. Playing time for the first team was bleak due to emerging talent coming from Sportpark De Toekomst, such as Thulani Serero and Lucas Andersen, and newly arrived Lerin Duarte. While registered by manager Frank de Boer to play in the clubs 2013–14 UEFA Champions League campaign if necessary, Enoh was given minutes in the Dutch Eerste Divisie for the reserves team Jong Ajax in the meantime, where he made his debut on 15 September 2013 against Willem II in a 1–1 draw at home.

Having come to terms with Antalyaspor from Turkey, Enoh left Ajax having appeared in 98 league matches, having scored 3 goals. He played in 13 matches for the KNVB Cup, and made 36 appearances on the continental stage for Ajax, scoring one goal, He also competed in the Johan Cruijff Shield once.

==== Antalyaspor (loan) ====
On 11 January 2014, it was announced that Enoh had signed with the Turkish club from Antalya. Ajax received a transfer fee of €600,000,- while Enoh will serve the remainder of the 2013–14 season on a 6-month loan spell from the Dutch club, before entering a two-year contract with the option for an additional year with Antalyaspor. He made his debut in the Turkish Cup match against Galatasaray which ended in a 1–1 draw at home. He made his regular season debut in the 3–1 win over Kayseri Erciyesspor.

=== Standard Liège ===
On 30 August 2014, only months after completing his transfer to Antalyaspor, it was announced that Enoh would transfer to Belgian Pro League side Standard Liège, signing a two-year contract. The transfer fee paid out to the Turkish club is unknown On 5 October 2014, Enoh made his debut for his new club in a match against Club Brugge. He was sent off, receiving a red card following a hard tackle on Ruud Vormer only 10 minutes into the match, which ended in a 3–0 loss. In 2017, Enoh terminated his contract with Standard, in order to sign for a club in England. Despite receiving offers from Belgium and Russia, he was unable to find an English club before the transfer window closed and was a free agent for half a year.

=== Willem II ===
On 31 January 2018, it was announced that Willem II had signed Enoh on a 6-month contract as a free transfer. Joining the club from Tilburg on the final day of the Winter transfer window, he was issued the number 32 shirt, returning to the Eredivisie where he had previously played for Ajax.

=== Enosis Neon Paralimni ===
The following Summer Enoh returned to Cyprus, this time relocating to the Greek side of the island, signing with newly promoted Enosis Neon Paralimni FC, competing in the Cypriot First Division, the top flight of football in Cyprus.

=== Olympiakos Nicosia ===
On 13 June 2019 he joined newly promoted Olympiakos Nicosia in the Cypriot First Division for 6 months.

=== Ajax amateurs ===
Following his professional career, he played one season for the Ajax Amateurs team in the Dutch Derde Divisie, the fourth tier of football in the Netherlands.

== International career ==
Enoh made his debut for Cameroon on 7 June 2009 against Morocco during their 2010 FIFA World Cup qualifying campaign. The match in Yaoundé ended in a 0–0 draw, with Enoh playing the full 90' minutes. He played in several more World Cup qualifiers and was called up for the 2010 African Cup of Nations in Angola as well. Drawn into Group D of the tournament, Cameroon played their first match of the tournament against Gabon. Wearing shirt number 18, Enoh was substituted on in the 76' minute for Henri Bedimo in the 0–1 loss at the Estádio Alto da Chela in Lubango. Enoh remained on the bench for the duration of the team's next fixture, a 3–4 win against Zambia, and on 21 January 2010 played the full 90' minutes against Tunisia in a 2–2 draw, concluding the group stage, and helping Cameroon to a 2nd-place finish and placement in the Quarter-finals of the tournament. In the next stage Cameroon faced Egypt in the Complexo da Sr. da Graça in Benguela on 25 January 2010. Cameroon went on to lose this fixture against the eventual champions Egypt, in a 3–1 loss after extra time, with Enoh again playing the entire match, thus ending Cameroons 2010 African Cup of Nations campaign.

Having secured a berth at the 2010 FIFA World Cup, in South Africa in a 0–2 victory against Morocco on 14 November 2009, Cameroon were drawn into Group E of the tournament, together with Denmark, Japan, and the Netherlands. Enoh played the full 90' minutes in the team's first fixture against Japan, a match that ended in a 0–1 loss at the Free State Stadium in Bloemfontein. He started in the next match against Denmark, but was substituted off in the 46' minute for Jean Makoun in the 1–2 loss in Pretoria. The team's final fixture in the group stage would be against eventual group winners the Netherlands on 24 June 2010 at the Cape Town Stadium. Enoh spent the duration of their final fixture on the bench, as Cameroon lost 1–2 against the eventual runners-up of the tournament, leaving Cameroon at the bottom of their group table eliminated at the group stage.

On 26 August 2010, Enoh was declared the vice-captain of the Cameroon national team, alongside his teammate Nicolas N'Koulou who played for AS Monaco at the time of the announcement. Both vice-captains deputise Samuel Eto’o who is maintained as the skipper for the Indomitable Lions. On 17 November 2013, Enoh helped the Cameroon national team to their seventh appearance in the FIFA World Cup finals of all time, when they defeated Tunisia 4–1 at home, helping to secure placement for the 2014 FIFA World Cup in Brazil. Enoh played the full 90' minutes of the deciding game at home in Yaoundé, having played a vital role for his national teams qualifying campaign in the central defensive midfield.

== Personal life ==
Enoh is a Christian. Enoh has spoken about his faith saying, "God had given me talents and the ability to play football—a great platform to share Jesus. Through football I can reach people who look up to me in my country and people I meet through my career. It has become the pathway through which the Lord can use me."

== Career statistics ==
=== Club ===
As of matches played on 9 November 2014

Appearances and goals by club, season and competition
Club	Season	League			National cup		League cup		Continental (Note: Includes UEFA Champions League and UEFA Cup, UEFA Europa League.)		Other (Note: Includes Johan Cruijff Shield.)		Total	
Club	Season	Division	Apps	Goals	Apps	Goals	Apps	Goals	Apps	Goals	Apps	Goals	Apps	Goals
Mount Cameroon FC	2003–04	Elite One	18	4	–		–		–		–		18	4
Mağusa Türk Gücü	2004–05	Birinci Lig	36	1	–		–		–		–		36	1
Türk Ocağı Limasol	2005–06	Birinci Lig	0	0	–		–		–		–		0	0
Ajax Cape Town	2006–07	Premier Soccer League	9	0	–		–		–		–		9	0
Ajax Cape Town	2007–08	Premier Soccer League	27	1	–		–		–		–		27	1
Ajax Cape Town	Total		36	1	0	0	0	0	0	0	0	0	36	1
Ajax	2008–09	Eredivisie	19	1	1	0	–		5	1	–		25	2
Ajax	2009–10	Eredivisie	27	1	5	0	–		9	0	–		41	1
Ajax	2010–11	Eredivisie	27	1	4	0	–		13	0	1	0	45	1
Ajax	2011–12	Eredivisie	22	0	2	0	–		5	0	0	0	29	0
Ajax	2012–13	Eredivisie	3	0	2	0	–		4	0	0	0	9	0
Ajax	Total		107	3	14	0	0	0	36	1	1	0	158	4
Fulham (loan)	2012–13	Premier League	9	0	–		–		–		–		9	0
Jong Ajax	2013–14	Eerste Divisie	9	0	–		–		–		–		9	0
Antalyaspor (loan)	2013–14	Süper Lig	8	0	2	0	–		–		–		10	0
Standard Liège	2014–15	Belgian Pro League	3	0	–		–		–		–		3	0
Career total			217	9	16	0	0	0	36	1	1	0	270	10

=== International ===
Appearances and goals by national team and year
National team	Year	Apps	Goals
Cameroon	2009	7	0
Cameroon	2010	11	1
Cameroon	2011	8	1
Cameroon	2012	1	0
Cameroon	2013	6	0
Cameroon	2014	5	0
Total		38	2

Scores and results list Cameroons' goal tally first.

Goal	Date	Venue	Opponent	Score	Result	Competition
1.	29 May 2010	Wörthersee Stadion, Klagenfurt, Austria	Slovakia	1–1	1–1	Friendly
2.	11 November 2011	Marrakesh Stadium, Marrakesh, Morocco	Sudan	1–0	3–1	Friendly

== Honours ==
Ajax Cape Town

- ABSA Cup: 2007

Ajax

- Eredivisie: 2010–11, 2011–12
- KNVB Cup: 2009–10

Standard Liège

- Belgian Cup: 2015–16

Individual

- Ajax Cape Town Player of the Year: 2008
