= Reunification Stadium =

Football stadium in Douala, Cameroon

Coordinates: 4°3′20″N 9°43′7″E

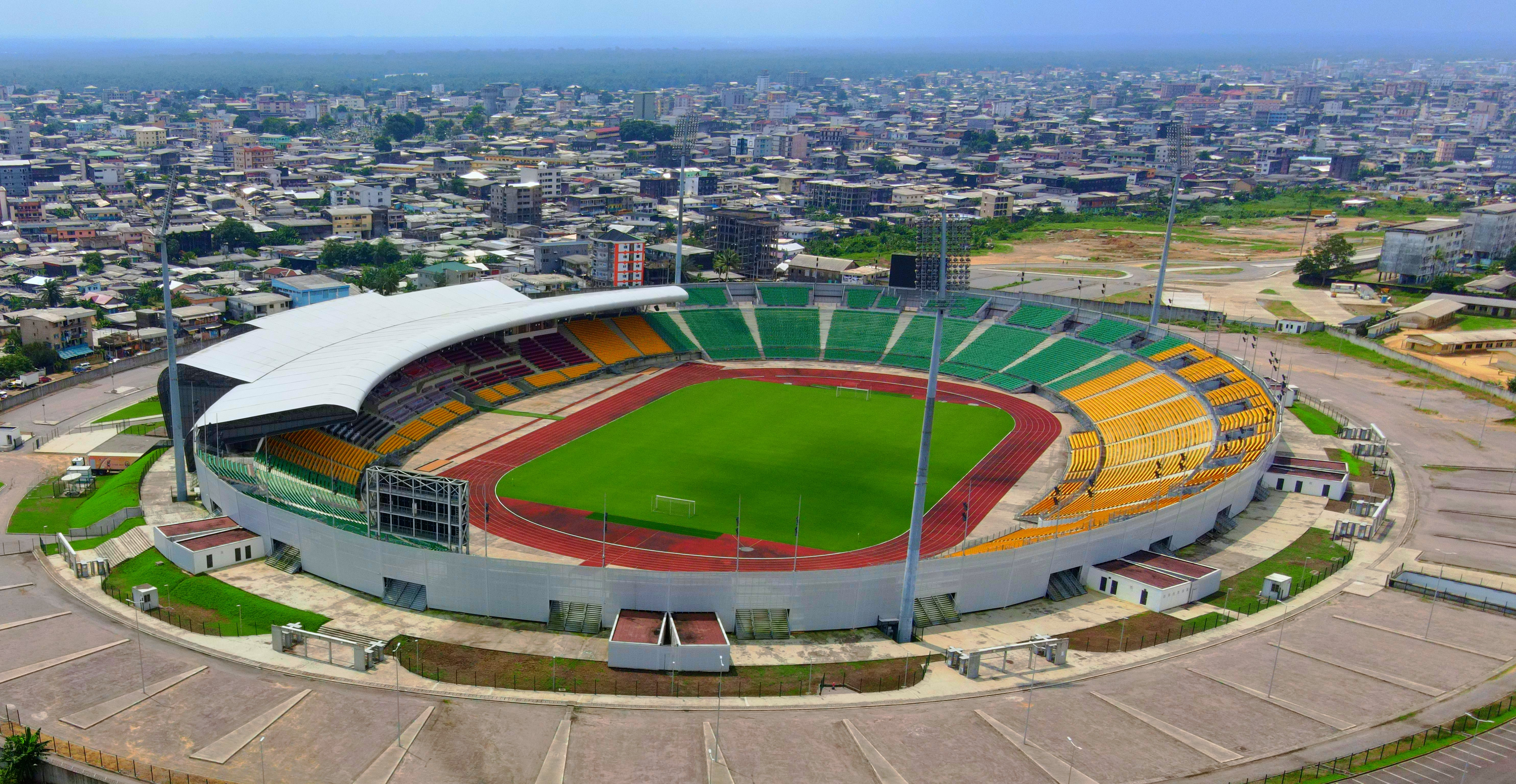
- Interactive map of Reunification Stadium
- Address: Douala; Cameroon
- Location: Douala, Cameroun
- Owner: Cameroonian Football Federation
- Capacity: 39,000
- Executive suites: 1
- Surface: Grass
- Record attendance: Record Attendance (2021 & ACOF)"

Construction
- Built: 1970
- Opened: 1972
- Renovated: 2018
- Architect: ATAUB Architectes

Tenants
- Union Douala; Les Astres FC; Oryx Douala

Reunification Stadium is a multi-use stadium in Douala, Cameroon. It is currently used mostly for football matches and serves as a home ground of Union Douala. The stadium holds 39,000 people and was built in 1972. On Sunday 14 May 2023, 27,634 people showed up for two Elite One play-off games at the Reunification Stadium, a record attendance. The first game was between Coton Sport and Gazelle FA, the second one between Canon de Yaoundé and Bamboutos FC.

== See also ==
- Lists of stadiums
