= 1971 Cameroonian Premier League =

Cameroonian Premier League
- Champions: Aigle Nkongsamba

Statistics of the 1971 Cameroonian Premier League season.

== Overview ==
Aigle Nkongsamba won the championship.
