= 1978 Cameroonian Premier League =

Cameroonian Premier League
- Champions: Union Douala

Statistics of the 1978 Cameroonian Premier League season.

== Overview ==
Union Douala won the championship.
