= 1974 Cameroonian Premier League =

Cameroonian Premier League
- Champions: Canon Yaoundé

Statistics of the 1974 Cameroonian Premier League season.

== Overview ==
Canon Yaoundé won the championship.
