= Danay FC =

Danay Football Club
- Full name: Danay Football Club
- Short name: Danay
- Founded: 1957
- Ground: Yagoua Municipal Stadium; Yagoua, Cameroon
- League: Elite One

Danay Football Club is a Cameroonian football club based in Yagoua. It is a member of the Fédération Camerounaise de Football.
