= 1966 Cameroonian Premier League =

Cameroonian Premier League
- Champions: Diamant Yaoundé

Statistics of the 1966 Cameroonian Premier League season.

== Overview ==
Diamant Yaoundé won the championship.
