= 2001 African Cup Winners' Cup =

Tournament details
- Dates: 17 November – 1 December 2001
- Teams: 37 (from 1 confederation)

Final positions
- Champions: (South Africa) Kaizer Chiefs (1st title)
- Runners-up: (Angola) Inter de Luanda

Tournament statistics
- Matches played: 8
- Goals scored: 14 (1.75 per match)

The 2001 African Cup Winners' Cup was the twenty-seventh season of Africa's second oldest club football tournament organised by CAF.

South African club Kaizer Chiefs appeared in and won their first African club final, defeating Angolan club Inter de Luanda 2–1 on aggregate in the two-legged final. Kaizer Chiefs were also named 2001 African Club of the Year at the conclusion of the African football season. For Kaizer Chiefs the year 2001 included the highs of being crowned African Club of the Year and lifting the African Cup Winners' Cup, but it also included the lows of the Ellis Park Stadium disaster in which 43 South African football fans lost their lives.

== Association team allocation ==
A total of 37 teams from 36 CAF associations qualified for the tournament after winning their respective premier domestic cups. Of the 37 teams that qualified 1 withdrew before fulfilling all of its fixtures in the preliminary round, 1 withdrew after fulfilling its Preliminary Round fixtures, 3 withdrew before the start of the first round and another withdrew before fulfilling all of its fixtures in the first round;

- Chadian club Gazelle had won their first leg tie against Sporting of Cape Verde in the preliminary round but failed to arrive in time for the second leg in Praia, Cape Verde. The second leg was rescheduled but Sporting withdrew before a date was set, handing Gazelle a walkover into the first round.
- Burundian club Atlético had secured their progress into the first round but withdrew from the competition.
- Okwawu United of Ghana, Matchedje of Mozambique and FC Djivan of Madagascar all withdrew before they were due to appear in the first round.
- Ugandan club Military Police withdrew before their second leg match against Nkana FC in the first round.

== Format ==
The tournament consisted of five rounds preceding a two-legged final.

- Preliminary round – The 10 lowest ranked teams – whose rankings were determined by their association's performances at previous CAF club tournaments – were drawn against each other in 5 matches consisting of two-legs each.
- First round – The 5 winners from the preliminary round were then drawn against the remaining 27 clubs, resulting in 16 matches consisting of two-legs each.
- Second round – The 16 winners from the first round were then drawn against each other, resulting in 8 matches consisting of two-legs each.
- Quarter-finals – The 8 winners from the second round were then drawn against each other, resulting in 4 matches consisting of two-legs each.
- Semi-finals – The 4 victorious quarter-finalists were then drawn against each other in 2 semi-finals consisting of two-legs each.
- Final – The victorious semi-finalists contested a two-legged final to determine the champion.

The away goals rule was used to determine the victors in the event of a match being tied over the two-legs. If it was not possible to determine a winner using the away goals rule, the tie went to a penalty shootout to determine the winner.

== Preliminary round ==
The first legs were played on 17 & 18 January, and the second legs were played on 4 March 2001.

=== Matches ===
Team 1	Agg.	Team 2	1st leg	2nd leg
Gazelle (Chad)	5–2*^{[1]}	(Cape Verde) Sporting	5–2	-
Mhlume United (Eswatini)	0–3	(Botswana) Mogoditshane Fighters	0–3	0–0
Mukura Victory Sports (Rwanda)	1–3	(Burundi) Atlético	1–0	0–3
US Stade Tamponnaise (Réunion)	5–2	Lesotho Defence Force	5–0	0–2
AO Evizo (Gabon)	6–1	(Equatorial Guinea) Deportivo Unidad	1–0	5–1

Notes:

^{^[1]} Following their 5–2 win over Sporting in the first leg, Gazelle had failed to arrive on time for the second leg. The second leg was rescheduled but Sporting withdrew before a date was set, handing Gazelle a walkover into the first round.

== First round ==
The first legs were played from 30 March-8 April, and the second legs were played from 13–19 April 2001.

=== Matches ===
Team 1	Agg.	Team 2	1st leg	2nd leg
ASC Port Autonome (Senegal)	1–2	(Tunisia) Club Africain	1–1	0–1
Gazelle (Chad)	2–3	(Democratic Republic of the Congo) AS Saint-Luc	0–1	2–2
Olympic FC (Niger)	0–6	(Ivory Coast) Stade d'Abidjan	0–2	0–4
Cercle Olympique (Mali)	0–11	(Angola) Inter Luanda	0–3	0–8
FAR Rabat (Morocco)	2–1	(Libya) Al-Hilal (Benghazi)	2–0	0–1
AO Evizo (Gabon)	w/o*^{[1]}	(Ghana) Okwawu United	-	-
Steve Biko (The Gambia)	1–2	(Algeria) CR Béni Thour	1–0	0–2
Vita Club Mokanda (Republic of the Congo)	1–1(4–5 pen)	(Nigeria) Niger Tornadoes	1–0	0–1
Atlético (Burundi)	w/o*^{[2]}	(Cameroon) Kumbo Strikers	-	-
Matchedje (Mozambique)	w/o*^{[3]}	(Ethiopia) Ethiopian Coffee	-	-
Mathare United (Kenya)	2–3	(Egypt) Ismaily	1–1	1–2
FC Djivan (Madagascar)	w/o*^{[4]}	(Tanzania) Simba SC	-	-
Al-Hilal Club (Sudan)	0–2	(Egypt) Zamalek	0–1	0–1
Nkana FC (Zambia)	3–0*^{[5]}	(Uganda) Military Police	3–0	-
Mogoditshane Fighters (Botswana)	4–4(a)	(Seychelles) Sunshine SC	3–2	1–2
US Stade Tamponnaise (Réunion)	2–3	(South Africa) Kaizer Chiefs	1–1	1–2

Notes:

^{^[1]} Okwawu United withdrew before the first leg, handing AO Evizo a walkover into the second round.
^{^[2]} Atlético withdrew before the first leg, handing Kumbo Strikers a walkover into the second round.
^{^[3]} Matchedje withdrew before the first leg, handing Ethiopian Coffee a walkover into the second round.
^{^[4]} FC Djivan withdrew before the first leg, handing Simba SC a walkover into the second round.
^{^[5]} Following their 3–0 defeat in the first leg, Military Police withdrew before their second leg tie against Nkana FC, handing Nkana FC a walkover into the second round.

== Second round ==
The first legs were played from 11–13 May, and the second legs were played on 26 & 27 May 2001.

=== Matches ===
Team 1	Agg.	Team 2	1st leg	2nd leg
Club Africain (Tunisia)	3–1	(Democratic Republic of the Congo) AS Saint-Luc	2–0	1–1
Stade d'Abidjan (Ivory Coast)	1–1(1–3 pen)	(Angola) Inter Luanda	1–0	0–1
FAR Rabat (Morocco)	3–3(a)	(Gabon) AO Evizo	3–1	0–2
CR Béni Thour (Algeria)	1–2	(Nigeria) Niger Tornadoes	1–0	0–2
Kumbo Strikers (Cameroon)	1–0	(Ethiopia) Ethiopian Coffee	1–0	0–0
Ismaily (Egypt)	2–1*^{[1]}	(Tanzania) Simba SC	2–0	0–1*
Zamalek (Egypt)	4–2	(Zambia) Nkana FC	2–0	2–2
Sunshine SC (Seychelles)	0–5	(South Africa) Kaizer Chiefs	0–2	0–3

^{^[1]} The second leg tie between Ismaily and Simba SC was abandoned in the 46th minute due to a waterlogged pitch. At the time Simba SC was leading 2–0 and the teams were tied 2–2 on aggregate. The second leg was rescheduled with Simba SC winning 1–0, not enough to overcome Ismaily as they won the tie 2–1 on aggregate. Aside from the match being abandoned, the original second leg tie had been controversial for two incidents. In the first incident the Ismaily players were alleged to have physically confronted the referee after he had awarded Simba SC the penalty that gave them a 2–0 lead, resulting in riot police entering the field and subduing the Ismaily players. In the second incident Ismaily player Emad El-Nahhas was attacked by a spectator wielding a broken bottle. Neither incident resulted in serious injury.

== Quarter-finals ==
The first legs were played on 7 & 9 September, and the second legs were played on 21, 23 & 24 September 2001.

=== Matches ===
Team 1	Agg.	Team 2	1st leg	2nd leg
Zamalek (Egypt)	2–3	(Tunisia) Club Africain	1–0	1–3
Kaizer Chiefs (South Africa)	1–1(a)	(Egypt) Ismaily	0–0	1–1
Niger Tornadoes (Nigeria)	1–4	(Angola) Inter Luanda	1–0	0–4
AO Evizo (Gabon)	0–3	(Cameroon) Kumbo Strikers	0–1	0–2

== Semi-finals ==
The first legs were played on 13 & 14 October, and the second legs were played on 27 & 28 October 2001.

=== Matches ===
Team 1	Agg.	Team 2	1st leg	2nd leg
Kaizer Chiefs (South Africa)	3–0	(Tunisia) Club Africain	2–0	1–0
Inter Luanda (Angola)	4–0	(Cameroon) Kumbo Strikers	3–0	1–0

== Final ==
Team 1	Agg.	Team 2	1st leg	2nd leg
Inter de Luanda (Angola)	1–2	(South Africa) Kaizer Chiefs	1–1	0–1

=== First leg ===
17 November 2001

Inter de Luanda (Angola)	1–1	(South Africa) Kaizer Chiefs
Esengo 27'		Jukulile 20'

Estádio da Cidadela, Luanda

=== Second leg ===
1 December 2001

Kaizer Chiefs (South Africa)	1–0	(Angola) Inter de Luanda
Mabedi 90' (pen.)

Ellis Park Stadium, Johannesburg
Referee: Gamal Al-Ghandour (Egypt)

Kaizer Chiefs won the two-legged final 2–1 on aggregate.
