= Stade Municipal (Dschang) =

Stadium in Dschang, Cameroon

Stade Municipal is a proposed stadium in Dschang, Cameroon. It is intended for football matches, and to serve as a home ground of Aigle Royal Menoua.

In 2016 the stadium was planned to have 1600 seats. In February 2022 the mayor of Dschang of a 5 hectare plot in the Tsinkop district available to the Cameroonian Football Federation. In March 2022 at least 8 families complained about the site, indicating that it was not available.
