= Gazelle FA =

Gazelle Football Academy de Garoua, commonly known as Gazelle FA, is a Cameroonian professional football club based in the city of Garoua, Cameroon. The club currently plays in the MTN Elite One.
