= AS Fortuna =

Association football club in Cameroon

- Full name: AS Fortuna de Mfou
- Founded: 1998; 28 years ago
- President: Roger Noah
- Coach: Prosper Ndedi Ebang
- League: Elite One
- 2026: 13th, Elite One
Home colours

AS Fortuna is a Cameroonian professional association football club based in Mfou, Cameroon. The club was founded in 1998.

== History ==
The club was founded in 1998.

The club earned promotion to the Elite One Cameroon Championship in 2018. In their first season in 2018, they finished 14th. In the 2019 and 2020 seasons they finished in 4th and in the 2020–21 season, they finished in 3rd place.
