= Colombe Sportive =

Association football club in Cameroon

- Full name: Colombe Sportive du Dja et Lobo
- Nickname: The Whites
- Ground: Municipal Stadium, Dja-et-Lobo
- Capacity: 2,000
- Chairman: Anatole Abessolo
- Manager: François Bikolo
- League: Elite One
- 2026: 1st (Champions)
Home colours	Away colours

Colombe Sportive du Dja et Lobo, commonly known as Colombe Sportive, is a football club based in Sangmélima, Cameroon. The team currently plays in the Elite One, the top tier of Cameroonian football.

== History ==
The club was founded in the city of Sangmélima and is the only team from the city to have played in the Elite One. Colombe Sportive made its debut in the top division in the 1986–87 season, remaining there until 1993.

In the 2016 season, the club returned to the Elite One after a 23-year absence.

== Honours ==
- Cameroon Premiere Division:
  - Winners (2): 2024–25, 2026.
- Cameroon Cup:
  - Winners (1): 2024.
  - Runners-up (1): 2025.
- Super Coupe Roger Milla:
  - Winners (1): 2024.
  - Runners-up (1): 2025.
