= Tiko United =

Tiko United FC
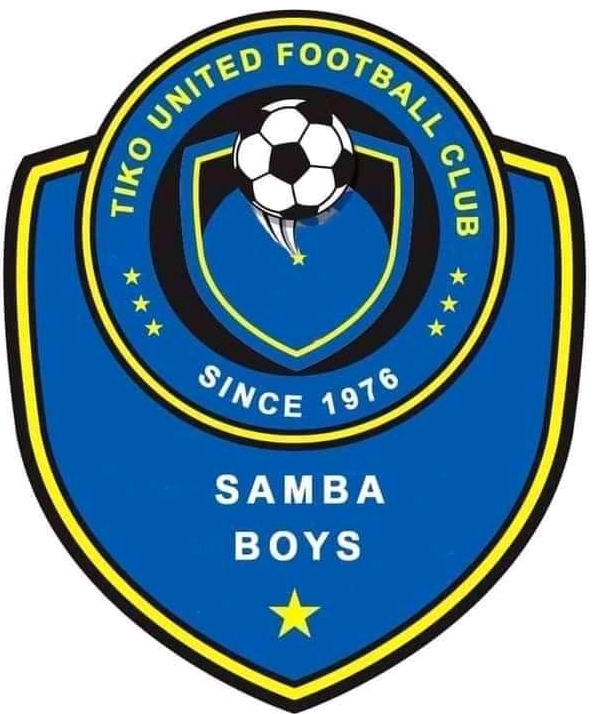
- Full name: Tiko United Football Club
- Nickname: Samba Boys
- Founded: 1976
- Ground: Stade de Tiko; Tiko, Cameroon
- Capacity: 5,000
- Chairman: Charles Eteki Dikongue
- Manager: Kengo Njangou Kwi
- League: Southwest Regional League
| Home colours | Away colours |

Tiko United FC is a Cameroonian football club based in Tiko, South West Region. They play in Southwest Regional League of the Cameroon Association Football.

== History ==
The club was founded in the early 1960s as C.D.C Tiko. During the late 70s and early 80s, its parent company, the Cameroon Development Corporation gradually relinquished sponsorship. Tea cultivation, being the main company product, was eventually taken over by a citizen cooperative in Tiko. It was then renamed Tiko United.

In 2009, the club won the Elite One for the first time in its history and a place in CAF Champions League in 2010.

=== Stadium ===
The club played his home matches since 2007 in the Molyko Omnisport Stadium in Buea, which has a capacity of 5000. Tiko played previously until 2006 in the Tiko Town Green Stadium, with 10.000 places.

== Current squad ==
Squad

== Achievements ==
- Cameroon Première Division: 1

2009.

- Cameroon Cup: 0
- Super Coupe Roger Milla: 0

== Performance in CAF competitions ==
- CAF Champions League: 1 appearance

2010 – first round

- CAF Confederation Cup: 1 appearance

2011 – first round

== Staff ==
=== Leading board ===
Board chairman

- Paul Meoto Njie

President general

- Charles Eteki Dikonge

Vice pres general

- Enowmpey Besong

executive president

- Victor Elame Ikome N'gea

==== Management ====
Manager

- Maurice Mbatchou

Director of Sports

- Obale Charles

==== Sports ====
Head coach

- Ernest Agbor

Assistant coach

- Dominic Ayissi
