= Victoria United FC (Cameroon) =

Cameroon Football Club

Victoria United
- Full name: Victoria United Football Club
- Nickname: OPOPO (One People One Power)
- Founded: 2002
- Ground: Limbe Stadium; Limbe
- Capacity: 20,000
- Chairman: Nkwain Valentine (Bobdidy)
- Manager: Dimitar Pantev
- League: Elite One
- 2026: Elite One, 8th
colours	colours

Victoria United is a Cameroonian football club from the city of Limbé who compete in the Elite One of Cameroon football. The team was founded in 2002.

They were relegated from the Cameroonian top flight in 2004 and returned in 2023 after winning the Elite Two 2022/23 championship . The club also won the South-West regional championship in 2021.

Their home stadium is Limbe Omnisport Stadium.

== Sponsors ==
Period	Kit manufacturer	Shirt sponsor
2023–present	(Singapore) Mafro Sports	MTN

== Honours ==
- Elite One: 1
  - 2023–24
- Elite Two: 1
  - 2022–23
- South West Regional League: 1
  - 2021–22

== See also ==
- Soccer24
- SofaScore
