= Kadji Sports Academy =

Association football club in Cameroon

KSA
- Full name: Kadji Sport Academies
- Nickname: KSA Douala
- Founded: 1996
- Ground: Stade Akwa; Douala, Cameroon
- Capacity: 5,000
- League: MTN Elite One
- Website: www.ksacademies.com
Home colours	Away colours

Kadji Sport Academy, commonly known as KSA, is a sports academy and association football team from Békoko, Douala in Cameroon. The academy was founded in 1996 by businessman Gilbert Kadji. Striker Samuel Eto'o was formed at the academy, and has since gone on to represent Cameroon national football team.

The club's basketball team won the Elite Messieurs championship in 2024.

== Notable football players ==
- (Cameroon) Modeste M'bami
- (Cameroon) Samuel Eto'o
- (Cameroon) Eric Djemba-Djemba
- (Cameroon) Stéphane Mbia
- (Cameroon) (Colombia) Oyié Flavié
- (Cameroon) Benjamin Moukandjo
- (Cameroon) Aurélien Chedjou
- (Cameroon) Carlos Kameni
- (Cameroon) Georges Mandjeck
- (Cameroon) Nicolas Nkoulou
- (Republic of the Congo) Dzon Delarge

== Honours ==
=== Basketball ===
- Elite Messieurs
  - Champions (1): 2024
