= Oryx Douala =

- Full name: Oryx Club de Douala
- Founded: April 1927
- Ground: Stade de la Réunification
- Capacity: 30,000
- League: Littoral Regional Championship (III)
Home colours	Away colours

Oryx Club de Douala is a football club from Douala, Cameroon, that achieved most of its success in the 1960s. It won the inaugural African Cup of Champions Clubs in 1965 beating Stade Malien on a score of 2–1 in the final, and so becoming the first club outfit from Cameroon to win the title.

They have also won five league titles and the Cameroon Cup three times, most of which came in the 1960s. Oryx Douala were founded in April 1927 and play in black and yellow striped shirts. The club's 5 title wins make them the Cameroon Elite One league's fourth most successful club of all time. The club plays at 30,000 capacity Stade de la Réunification and currently they play in a lower league.

== Achievements ==
- Cameroon Premiere Division: 5
  - 1961, 1963, 1964, 1965, 1967
- Cameroon Cup: 4
  - 1956 (before independence), 1963, 1968, 1970
  - Runners-up: 1969
- African Cup of Champions Clubs: 1
  - 1965

== Performance in CAF competitions ==
- African Cup of Champions Clubs: 3 appearances

1965: Champion
1966: Semi-Finals
1968: Quarter-Finals

1965 African Cup of Champions Clubs

Oryx Douala qualified for the inaugural Cup of Champions Clubs after winning the domestic league the previous season. Douala were then placed in the "Central Africa" group and after topping this group, progressed to the semi-finals, where they played Real Republicans of Ghana. A 2–1 victory put Douala in the final, and a 2–1 win in front of a crowd of 30,000 at Accra Stadium saw Oryx Douala crowned champions of Africa. However, the club have been unable to emulate this success since, with a semi-finals appearance, two years being the closest they have come.
