= Aigle Royal Menoua =

Aigle Royal de la Menoua
- Full name: Aigle Royal de la Menoua
- Nickname: Aigle Royal de Dschang
- Founded: 1932
- Ground: Stade Municipal; Dschang, Cameroon
- Capacity: 5,000
- Manager: Justin Kamgue
- League: Elite One
- 2018: Elite One, 17th
Home colours

Aigle Royal de la Menoua is a Cameroonian football club based in Dschang. They are a member of Cameroonian Football Federation.

== Honours ==
- Cameroon Cup
  - Runners-up (1): 2008

== Performance in CAF competitions ==
- CAF Champions League: 1 appearance

2006 – Preliminary Round

- CAF Confederation Cup: 1 appearance

2009 – First Round of 16
