= Cameroonian Cup =

Cameroon Cup
- Organiser(s): FECAFOOT
- Teams: 32
- Qualifier for: CAF Confederations Cup
- Current champions: Fovu Club

The Cameroon Cup or Coupe Du Cameroon in French is the national football competition in Cameroon, on a knock-out-basis.

== Cup finals ==
=== Before independence ===
- 1941 : Caïman de Douala 6-0 Mikado ASTP
- 1942 : Caïman de Douala 3-1 Léopards Douala
- 1943 : Caïman de Douala
- 1944-53 : Unknown
- 1954 : Jeunesse Bamiléké
- 1956 : Oryx Douala 6-0 Léopards Douala
- 1957 : Canon Yaoundé 1-0 Léopards Douala
- 1958 : Tonnerre Yaoundé 3-1 Aigle Royal de la Menoua (Dschang)
- 1959 : Caïman de Douala 2-1 Vent Sportif (Douala)

=== After independence ===
Year	Winner	Result	Runner-up
1960	Parthenay Lion Yaoundé	2-1	Canon Yaoundé
1961	US Douala	4-0	Union Yaoundé
1962	Lion Yaoundé	4-3	US Douala
1963	Oryx Douala	2-1 (a.p.)	Tonnerre Yaoundé
1964	Diamant Yaoundé	3-0	P & T Social Club (Buéa)
1965	Lion Yaoundé	4-1	CDC Victoria United
1966	Lion Yaoundé	3-1	CAMBANK (Yaoundé)
1967	Canon Yaoundé	1-0	PWD Bamenda
1968	Oryx Douala	2-1	Prison Buéa
1969	US Douala	2-0	Oryx Douala
1970	Oryx Douala	2-0	Aigle Nkongsamba
1971	Diamant Yaoundé	3-2	Caïman de Douala
1972	Diamant Yaoundé	3-2	Caïman de Douala
1973	Canon Yaoundé	5-2	Diamant Yaoundé
1974	Tonnerre Yaoundé	1-0	Canon Yaoundé
1975	Canon Yaoundé	2-1	Aigle Nkongsamba
1976	Canon Yaoundé	2-0	RC Bafoussam
1977	Canon Yaoundé	1-0	Caïman de Douala
1978	Canon Yaoundé	4-3	US Douala
1979	Dynamo Douala	3-1	PWD Bamenda
1980	US Douala	2-1	Canon Yaoundé
1981	Dynamo Douala	2-0	US Douala
1982	Dragon Douala	4-1 (a.p.)	Dihep Nkam (Yabassi)
1983	Canon Yaoundé	3-2	US Douala
1984	Dihep Nkam (Yabassi)	1-0	US Douala
1985	US Douala	2-0	Canon Yaoundé
1986	Canon Yaoundé	1-0	Rail Douala
1987	Tonnerre Yaoundé	4-2	Diamant Yaoundé
1988	Panthère Sportive du Ndé FC (Bangangté)	1-0	RC Bafoussam
1989	Tonnerre Yaoundé	1-0	Diamant Yaoundé
1990	Prévoyance Yaoundé	1-1 (6-5 pen.)	Tonnerre Yaoundé
1991	Tonnerre Yaoundé	1-0	RC Bafoussam
1992	Olympic Mvolyé	1-0	Diamant Yaoundé
1993	Canon Yaoundé	2-0	Léopards Douala
1994	Olympic Mvolyé	1-0	Tonnerre Yaoundé
1995	Canon Yaoundé	1-0	Océan Kribi
1996	RC Bafoussam	1-0	Stade Bandjoun
1997	US Douala	2-1	Port FC (Douala)
1998	Dynamo Douala	1-0	Canon Yaoundé
1999	Canon Yaoundé	2-1	Coton Sport FC (Garoua)
2000	Kumbo Strikers FC (Kumbo)	1-0	Unisport FC (Bafang)
2001	Fovu Club (Baham)	3-2	Cintra Yaoundé
2002	Mount Cameroon FC (Buéa)	2-1	Sable FC (Batié)
2003	Coton Sport FC (Garoua)	2-1	Sable FC (Batié)
2004	Coton Sport FC (Garoua)	1-0	US Douala
2005	Impôts FC (Yaoundé)	1-0	Unisport FC (Bafang)
2006	US Douala	1-0	Fovu Club (Baham)
2007	Coton Sport FC (Garoua)	1-0	Les Astres FC (Douala)
2008	Coton Sport FC (Garoua)	4-2	Aigle Royal de la Menoua (Dschang)
2009	Panthère Sportive du Ndé FC (Bangangté)	3-2	Les Astres FC (Douala)
2010	Fovu Club (Baham)	2-1	Les Astres FC (Douala)
2011	Coton Sport FC (Garoua)	0-0 (3-0 pen.)	Unisport FC (Bafang)
2012	Unisport FC (Bafang)	2-0	New Star FC (Douala)
2013	Yong Sports Academy (Bamenda)	0-0 (4-1 pen.)	Canon Yaoundé
2014	Coton Sport FC (Garoua)	2-0	Panthère Sportive du Ndé FC (Bangangté)
2015	UMS de Loum	2-0	Panthère Sportive du Ndé FC (Bangangté)
2016	APEJES FA (Mfou)	2-0	Bamboutos FC (Mbouda)
2017	New Star FC (Douala)	1-0	UMS de Loum
2018	Eding Sport (Lekié)	1-0	Lion Blessé (Fotouni)
2019	Stade Renard de Melong (Melong)	3–2	AS FAP (Yaounde)
2020		-	
2021	PWD (Bamenda)	1-0	Les Astres FC (Douala)
2022	Coton Sport FC (Garoua)	1-0	Bamboutos FC (Mbouda)
2023	Fovu Club (Baham)	2-0	PWD (Bamenda)
2024	Colombe Sportive (Sangmélima)	1-0	Aigle Royal de la Menoua (Dschang)
2025	Panthère Sportive du Ndé FC (Bangangté)	1-1 (3-1 pen.)	Colombe Sportive (Sangmélima)

== Total ==
Club	Titles
Canon Yaoundé	12
Coton Sport FC (Garoua)	7
US Douala	6
Lion Yaoundé	4
Tonnerre Kalara Club	4
Oryx Douala	3
Diamant Yaoundé	3
Dynamo Douala	3
Fovu Club (Baham)	3
Panthère Sportive du Ndé FC (Bangangté)	3
Olympic Mvolyé	2
Dragon Douala	1
Dihep Nkam	1
Prévoyance Yaoundé	1
RC Bafoussam	1
Kumbo Strikers FC (Jumbo)	1
Mount Cameroon FC (Buéa)	1
Impôts FC (Yaoundé)	1
Unisport FC (Bafang)	1
YOSA (Bamenda)	1
UMS de Loum	1
APEJES FA (Mfou)	1
New Star FC (Douala)	1
Eding Sport (Lekié)	1
PWD Bamenda (Bamenda)	1
Colombe Sportive (Sangmélima)	1
