= Les Astres FC =

Cameroonian football club

Les Astres
- Full name: Les Astres Football Club de Douala
- Nickname: les Brésiliens de Bépanda (the Brazilians from Bépanda)
- Founded: 2002
- Ground: Stade de la Réunification; Douala, Cameroon
- Capacity: 39,000
- Manager: Nicolas Tonyè
- League: Elite One
- 2023-24: 11th
| Home colours | Away colours |

Les Astres FC de Douala is a Cameroonian professional football club based in Douala. It is a member of the Cameroonian Football Federation.

== Honours ==
- Cameroon Première Division
  - Runners-up: 2009–10, 2010–11, 2013
- Cameroon Cup
  - Runners-up: 2007, 2009, 2010

== Performance in CAF competitions ==
- CAF Champions League: 3 appearances

2011 – Preliminary Round
2012 – Preliminary Round
2014 – First Round

- CAF Confederation Cup: 3 appearances

2006 – First Round
2007 – Group stage/Semi-finals
2008 – Second Round of 16

== Current squad ==
As of 17 June 2019.

Note: Flags indicate national team as defined under FIFA eligibility rules; some limited exceptions apply. Players may hold more than one non-FIFA nationality.

| No. | Pos. | Nation | Player |
|---|---|---|---|
| 1 | GK | CMR | Yannick Epanè |
| 2 | DF | CMR | Andre Akono Effa |
| 3 | DF | CMR | Nkot Nyamat |
| 4 | DF | CMR | Francky Essombo |
| 5 | DF | CMR | Jean Parfait Tchoubia |
| 6 | DF | CMR | Herve Ebolla Dipoko |
| 7 | MF | CMR | Christian Heumi |
| 8 | MF | CMR | Camille Kamdem Kamdem |
| 10 | FW | CMR | Anaba Metogo |
| 12 | FW | CMR | Romeo Yem |
| 13 | MF | CMR | Harry Ako |
| 14 | MF | CMR | Eko'o Bertrand Owundi |
| 16 | GK | CMR | Hugo Nyame (Captain) |

| No. | Pos. | Nation | Player |
|---|---|---|---|
| 18 | DF | CMR | Yann Abianda |
| 19 | FW | CMR | Franck Bidias Namatchoua |
| 20 | DF | CMR | Thomas Libih |
| 21 | FW | CMR | Christian Ntouba |
| 22 | GK | CMR | Jourdain Mbaynaissem |
| 23 | FW | CMR | Djicka Aimé |
| 24 | MF | CMR | Nesmen Ndemen Feuleu |
| 25 | FW | CMR | Raymond Fossouo |
| 26 | MF | CMR | Emmanuel Amungwa |
| 27 | MF | CMR | Bienvenue Embola |
| 28 | FW | CMR | Alimù Daouda |
| 29 | DF | CMR | Gael Ngah |
