= Mount Cameroon FC =

Cameroonian football club

Mount Cameroon F.C.
- Full name: Mount Cameroon Football Club Buea
- Nickname: Lava Boys
- Short name: MCFC
- Founded: 1997
- Ground: Molyko Omnisport Stadium - Mount Cameroon Stadium; Buéa, Cameroon
- Capacity: 15,000
- Owner: Calvin Foinding
- Chairman: Calvin Foinding
- League: 2nd Division - South-West Regional League
- 2017/2018: 3rd
Home colours	Away colours

Mount Cameroon Football Club is a Cameroonian football club based in Buéa. The club was founded in 1997 by Hon. Calvin Foinding. They have competed for more than 12 years in the Cameroon Première Division (Elite One). Their home stadium is the 3,200 seat Molyko Omnisport Stadium but Mount Cameroon FC also plays its home matches on its own academy "Stade d'Honneur" field.

Mount Cameroon FC took football in the region to the pinnacle in 2002 when they became the first club in the region and second West of the Mungo to lift the Cup of Cameroon.

== Notable players ==
Mount Cameroon FC have served as a springboard for several youth players who have gone on to have successful professional careers. Notable players who started their careers at MCFC include Eyong Enoh, Charley Roussel Fomen, Valentine Atem, Donald Djousse and Elvis Mokake.

== Management and coaching ==
=== Club officials ===
- President: Hon. Calvin Foinding
- Vice-president: Christopher Ngopang

=== Coaching ===
- Head Coach: Ache Ebenezer Edong
- Assistant Coach: Pascal Moumi
- Assistant Coach: Mutia Jonathan Batambuh

== Honours ==
- Cameroon Première Division:
- Cameroon Cup: 1

Winners

2002.

- Super Coupe Roger Milla: 1

Winners

2002.

== Performance in CAF competitions ==
- CAF Confederation Cup: 1 appearance 2008 - Second Round of 16
- CAF Cup Winners' Cup: 1 appearance 2003 - Second Round
