= Elite One =

Top-level football league in Cameroon

MTN Elite One
- Founded: 1961
- Country: Cameroon
- Confederation: CAF
- Number of clubs: 14 (from 2025-26 Season)
- Level on pyramid: 1
- Relegation to: Elite Two
- Domestic cup(s): Cameroonian Cup; Super Coupe Roger Milla
- International cup(s): Champions League; Confederation Cup
- Current champions: Colombe Sportive (2025–26)
- Most championships: Coton Sport (18)
- Current: 2026 Elite One

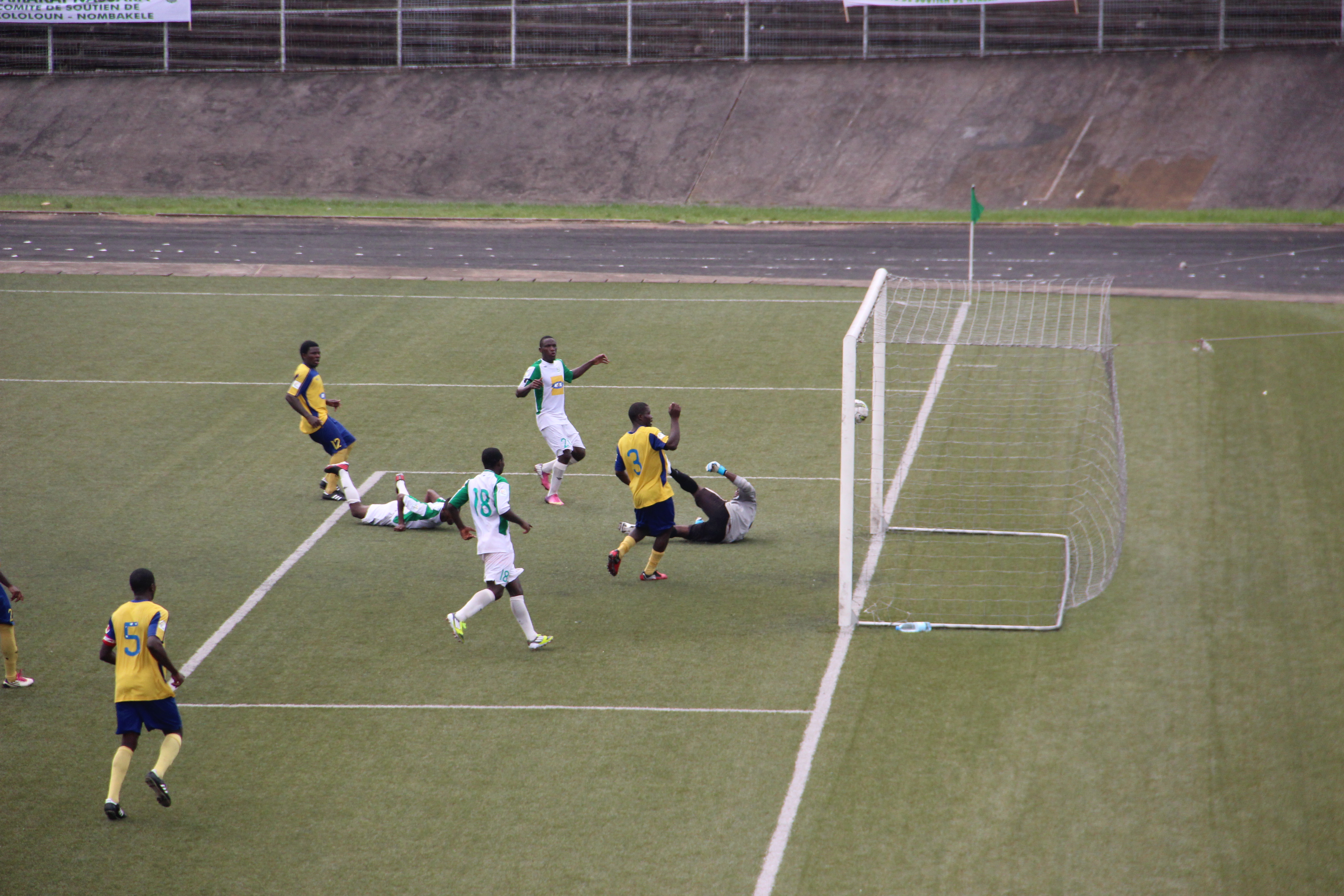
Elite One match on 24 February 2013; in Douala

The Championnat du Cameroun de football (also known as MTN Elite One since 2007, as it is sponsored by MTN Group) is the highest division of professional association football league system in Cameroon, governed by the Cameroonian Football Federation since its establishment in 1961.

== Prize money ==
Champions	100,000,000 XAF
Runners-up	
3rd Place	

== Current Teams - 2025–26 ==
Locations of the 2025–26 MTN Elite One clubs

Team	Location	2024–25 season	First season in Elite One	No. of Elite One seasons	Stadium	Stadium Capacity	Elite One titles	Manager
Aigle Royal de la Menoua	Dschang	Promoted	1932	18	Stade de Dschang	5,000	0	Gaston Temfack
Aigle Royal du Moungo	Nkongsamba	12th	1933	22	Stade de Melong	5,000	1	Emmanuel Ndoumbe Bosso
AS Fortuna Mfou	Mfou	11th	1998	8	Stade Militaire	2,000	0	Prosper Nkou
Canon Yaoundé	Yaoundé	7th	1930	52	Stade Ahmadou Ahidjo	40,122	10	Joseph Atangana
Colombe Sportive	Yaoundé	1st	1953	15	Stade Annexe 1 Omnisport	2,000	0	Richard Towa
Coton Sport	Garoua	4th	1986	34	Stade Roumdé Adjia	30,000	18	Daniel Breard
Dynamo Douala	Douala	10th	1948	28	Stade de la Réunification	30,000	0	Clément Arroga
Fauve Azur Elite	Yaoundé	9th	2016	5	Stade de Ngoa Ekélé	5,000	0	Anicet Mbarga Foe
Gazelle FA	Garoua	3rd	2014	4	Stade Roumdé Adjia	30,000	0	Alioum Kadji
Panthère du Ndé	Bangangté	2nd	1951	36	Stade Municipal de Bangangté	5,000	0	Souleymanou Aboubakar
PWD Bamenda	Bamenda	8th	1962	24	Bamenda Proximity Stadium	2,500	1	David Pagou
Stade Renard	Melong	5th	2009	10	Stade de Melong	5,000	0	Jules Abah Onana
Unisport du Haut Nkam	Bafang	Promoted	1959	31	Stade Municipal de Bafang	5,000	1	Jovanovic Sinisa
Victoria United	Limbe	6th	2002	3	Limbe Omnisport Stadium	20,000	1	Dimitar Pantev

== Champions ==
As of 2025–26 season

Superscript numbers indicate the cumulative number of championships for that team to that year.

Season	Champions
1961	Oryx Douala
1962	Caïman Douala
1963	Oryx Douala^{4}
1964	Oryx Douala^{4}
1965	Oryx Douala^{4}
1966	Diamant Yaoundé
1967	Oryx Douala^{5}
1968	Caïman Douala^{2}
1969	Union Douala
1970	Canon Yaoundé
1971	Aigle Nkongsamba
1972	Léopards Douala^{2}
1973	Léopards Douala^{2}
1974	Canon Yaoundé^{2}
1975	Caïman Douala^{3}
1976	Union Douala^{2}
1977	Canon Yaoundé^{3}
1978	Union Douala^{3}
1979	Canon Yaoundé^{5}
1980	Canon Yaoundé^{5}
1981	Tonnerre Yaoundé
1982	Canon Yaoundé^{6}
1983	Tonnerre Yaoundé^{3}
1984	Tonnerre Yaoundé^{3}
1985	Canon Yaoundé^{8}
1986	Canon Yaoundé^{8}
1987	Tonnerre Yaoundé^{5}
1988	Tonnerre Yaoundé^{5}
1989	Racing Club
1990	Union Douala^{4}
1991	Canon Yaoundé^{9}
1992	Racing Club^{3}
1993	Racing Club^{3}
1994	Aigle Nkongsamba^{2}
1995	Racing Club^{4}
1996	Unisport
1997	Coton Sport^{2}
1998	Coton Sport^{2}
1999	Sable FC
2000	Fovu Club
2001	Coton Sport^{3}
2002	Canon Yaoundé^{10}
2003	Coton Sport^{9}
2004	Coton Sport^{9}
2005	Coton Sport^{9}
2006	Coton Sport^{9}
2007	Coton Sport^{9}
2007–08	Coton Sport^{9}
2008–09	Tiko United
2009–10	Coton Sport^{11}
2010–11	Coton Sport^{11}
2011–12	Union Douala^{5}
2013	Coton Sport^{14}
2014	Coton Sport^{14}
2015	Coton Sport^{14}
2016	UMS de Loum
2017	Eding Sport
2018	Coton Sport^{15}
2019	UMS de Loum^{2}
2019–20	PWD Bamenda
2020–21	Coton Sport^{18}
2021–22	Coton Sport^{18}
2022–23	Coton Sport^{18}
2023–24	Victoria United
2024–25	Colombe Sportive
2025–26	Colombe Sportive

PWD Bamenda were crowned champions after the 2019–20 season couldn't be completed due to the effects of the COVID-19 pandemic.

=== Titles by team ===
Club	Wins
Coton Sport	18
Canon Yaoundé	10
Oryx Douala	5
Union Douala	5
Tonnerre Yaoundé	5
Racing Club	4
Caïman Douala	3
Aigle Nkongsamba	2
Colombe Sportive	2
Léopards Douala	2
UMS de Loum	2
Diamant Yaoundé	1
Unisport	1
Sable FC	1
Fovu Club	1
Tiko United	1
Eding Sport	1
PWD Bamenda	1
Victoria United	1

== Qualification for CAF competitions ==
=== Association ranking for the 2025–26 CAF club season ===
The association ranking for the 2025–26 CAF Champions League and the 2025–26 CAF Confederation Cup will be based on results from each CAF club competition from 2020–21 to the 2024–25 season.

Legend

- CL: CAF Champions League
- CC: CAF Confederation Cup
- ≥: Associations points might increase on basis of its clubs performance in 2024–25 CAF club competitions
- Associations ranked 1–12 are eligible to enter two teams in each CAF club competition.

Rank			Association	2020–21 (× 1)		2021–22 (× 2)		2022–23 (× 3)		2023–24 (× 4)		2024–25 (× 5)		Total
2025	2024	Mvt	Association	CL	CC	CL	CC	CL	CC	CL	CC	CL	CC	Total
1	1	—	Egypt	8	3	7	4	8	2.5	7	7	10	4	190.5
2	2	—	Morocco	4	6	9	5	8	2	2	4	5	5	142
3	4	+1	South Africa	8	2	5	4	4	3	4	1.5	9	3	131
4	3	-1	Algeria	6	5	7	1	6	5	2	3	5	5	130
5	6	+1	Tanzania	3	0.5	0	2	3	4	6	0	2	4	82.5
6	5	-1	Tunisia	4	3	5	1	4	2	6	1	3	0.5	82.5
7	8	+1	Angola	1	0	5	0	2	0	3	1.5	2	2	55
8	7	-1	DR Congo	4	0	0	3	1	2	4	0	2	0	45
9	9	—	Sudan	3	0	3	0	3	0	2	0	3	0	41
10	11	+1	Ivory Coast	0	0	0	1	0	3	3	0	1	2	38
11	10	-1	Libya	0	0.5	0	5	0	0.5	0	3	0	0	24
12	12	—	Nigeria	0	2	0	0	0	2	0	2	0	1	21
13	15	+2	Mali	0	0	0	0	0	1	0	2	1	0.5	18.5
14	14	—	Ghana	0	0	0	0	0	0	1	3	0	0	16
15	13	-2	Guinea	2	0	1	0	2	0	0	0.5	0	0	12
16	19	+3	Botswana	0	0	1	0	0	0	1	0	0	0.5	8.5
17	21	+4	Senegal	1	2	0	0	0	0	0	0	0	1	8
18	17	-1	Mauritania	0	0	0	0	0	0	2	0	0	0	8
19	18	-1	Congo	0	0	0	1	0	1	0	0.5	0	0	7
20	16	-4	Cameroon	0	3	0	0.5	1	0	0	0	0	0	7
21	22	+1	Togo	0	0	0	0	0	1	0	0	0	0	3
22	22	—	Uganda	0	0	0	0	1	0	0	0	0	0	3
23	-	new	Mozambique	0	0	0	0	0	0	0	0	0	0.5	2.5
24	20	-4	Zambia	0	1.5	0	0.5	0	0	0	0	0	0	2.5
25	24	-1	Eswatini	0	0	0	0.5	0	0	0	0	0	0	1
25	24	-1	Niger	0	0	0	0.5	0	0	0	0	0	0	1
27	26	-1	Burkina Faso	0	0.5	0	0	0	0	0	0	0	0	0.5

== Performance by club ==
Club	City	Titles
Coton Sport	Garoua	18
Canon Yaoundé	Yaoundé	10
TKC Yaoundé	Yaoundé	5
Oryx Douala	Douala	5
US Douala	Douala	5
RC Bafoussam	Bafoussam	4
Caïman Douala	Douala	3
Aigle Nkongsamba	Nkongsamba	2
Colombe Sportive	Sangmélima	2
Léopards	Douala	2
UMS de Loum	Loum	2
Diamant Yaoundé	Yaoundé	1
Unisport FC	Bafang	1
Sable FC	Batié	1
Fovu Baham	Baham	1
Tiko United	Tiko	1
Eding Sport	Mfou	1
PWD Bamenda	Bamenda	1
Victoria United	Limbe	1

== Top goalscorers ==
Season	Country	Best scorers	Team	Goals
2002	(Cameroon)	Hans Eric Ekounga	Coton Sport FC	
2003	(Cameroon)	Etélé Ambassa Jean	Bamboutos FC	14
2005	(Cameroon)	Bakari Inoi	Kadji Sport Academy	20
2006	(Republic of the Congo)	Francis Litsingi	Coton Sport FC	15
2007–08	(Cameroon)	Ayuk Roland Agbor	Tiko United FC	36
2008–09	(Niger)	Daouda Kamilou	Coton Sport FC	
2017	(Niger)	Daouda Kamilou	Coton Sport	20
2021–22	(Cameroon)	Enow Nkembe Adolf	AS Fortuna	20
2022–23	(Cameroon)	Emmanuel Mahop	Canon Yaoundé	13
2023–24	(Cameroon)	Jules Armand Kooh	Les Astres	22
