= Bamboutos FC =

- Full name: Bamboutos Football Club de Mbouda
- Nickname(s): Le fer de l'ouest
- Founded: 1966
- Ground: Stade de Mbouda; Mbouda, Cameroon
- Capacity: 12,000
- Chairman: Didier Nguimfack
- Manager: François Tchoungui
- League: Elite One
- 2023–24: 12th
Home colours

Bamboutos FC is a Cameroonian football club based in Mbouda and founded in 1966. They are a member of the Cameroonian Football Federation. Their home stadium is Stade de Mbouda.

The club was founded in 1966.

== Honours ==
- Cameroon Première Division: 3
- Cameroon Cup: 4
- Super Coupe Roger Milla: 6
- Unifac Clubs Cup: 10

2004

== Performance in CAF competitions ==
- CAF Confederation Cup: 1 appearance

2005 – second round of 16
