= Kumbo Strikers FC =

Kumbo Strikers
- Full name: Kumbo Strikers
- Nickname: KSFC
- Founded: 1992
- Ground: Kumbo Municipal Stadium; Kumbo
- Capacity: 2,000
- Chairman: Martine Salia
- Manager: Fai Sale Shulika
- League: North West Regional League

Kumbo Strikers is a Cameroonian football club based in Kumbo. They are a member of the Cameroonian Football Federation.

The team was founded in 1992 and play in Cameroon Second Division.

Their home stadium is Kumbo Municipal Stadium and they are nicknamed the "KSFC".

== Honours ==
- Cameroon Cup: 1

2000

- Super Coupe Roger Milla: 1

2000

== Performance in CAF competitions ==
- 2001 African Cup Winners' Cup: Semi-final
