= Coton Sport FC de Garoua =

Association football club in Cameroon

Coton Sport
- Full name: Coton Sport Football Club de Garoua
- Nickname: Les Cotonniers (The Cottoners)
- Founded: 1986; 40 years ago
- Ground: Stade Roumdé Adjia
- Capacity: 30,000
- Chairman: Abdouraman Ousmanou
- Manager: Adama Tougoué
- League: Elite One
- 2026: Elite One, 4th
| Home colours | Away colours |

Coton Sport Football Club de Garoua, or simply Coton Sport, is a Cameroonian professional football club based in Garoua. They play their home games at the Stade Omnisport de Garoua, commonly known as the Roumde Adjia Stadium. The club is chaired by Sadou Fernand. The first team plays in MTN Elite One (Cameroonian first division) (since 1993) and competes in 2012 in the CAF Champions League. The club has the largest budget of a Cameroonian club (500 million CFA francs).

It has won 18 Cameroon championships and six Cameroon cups. In addition, in continental competitions, the club reached the final of the CAF Cup in 2003 and the CAF Champions League in 2008 and the semi-finals of the same competition in 2013.

== History ==
The club was founded in 1986 and campaigned in the lower leagues until they were promoted to the country's Premier League in 1992. Since 1996 Coton Sport has dominated local football, winning eleven league titles in the process. In 2008 the club finished runners up in the CAF Champions League, losing to Al Ahly SC of Egypt in the final.

== Honours ==
=== National titles ===
- Elite 1:
  - Champions (18): 1997, 1998, 2001, 2003, 2004, 2005, 2006, 2007, 2007–08, 2009–10, 2010–11, 2013, 2014, 2015, 2018, 2020–21, 2021–22, 2022–23
  - Runners-up (6): 1994, 1996, 1999, 2000, 2002, 2019
- Cameroonian Cup:
  - Winners (7): 2003, 2004, 2007, 2008, 2011, 2014, 2022
  - Runners-up (1): 1999
- Super Coupe Roger Milla:
  - Winners (1): 2023
  - Runners-up (2): 2001, 2022

=== International titles ===
- CAF Champions League:
  - Runners-up (1): 2008
- CAF Cup:
  - Runners-up (1): 2003

== Current squad ==
As of 16 March 2023.

Note: Flags indicate national team as defined under FIFA eligibility rules; some limited exceptions apply. Players may hold more than one non-FIFA nationality.

| No. | Pos. | Nation | Player |
|---|---|---|---|
| 1 | GK | CMR | Jean-Daniel Nyeck |
| 2 | DF | CMR | Youssoufa Houzaifi |
| 3 | DF | CMR | Goni Ali |
| 4 | DF | CMR | Franck Baho Henock |
| 5 | FW | CMR | Frédéric Fomundam |
| 6 | DF | CMR | Che Malone |
| 7 | FW | CMR | Patient Gouégoué |
| 8 | FW | CMR | Stanislas Madi |
| 9 | FW | CMR | Stéphane Tchakounte |
| 10 | MF | CMR | Brawdon Eno |
| 11 | FW | CMR | Jean-Emmanuel Nguéwawe |
| 12 | DF | CMR | Ibrahim Abba |
| 13 | MF | CMR | Ismaël Ben Youssoufa |
| 14 | FW | CMR | Ramsès Nguimzeu |
| 15 | MF | CMR | Veraloh Macgregor |
| 16 | GK | CMR | Mamoudou Ahamada Saliou |
| 17 | FW | CMR | François Nkambé |
| 18 | MF | CMR | Koulagna Aziz Bassane |
| 19 | FW | CMR | Marius Kada |
| 20 | DF | CMR | Mamoudou Hassana Abbo |

| No. | Pos. | Nation | Player |
|---|---|---|---|
| 21 | MF | CMR | Philippe Banen |
| 22 | GK | CMR | Gadin Allambatnan |
| 23 | MF | CMR | Reich Kokolo |
| 24 | MF | CMR | Ako Harry Oru |
| 25 | DF | CMR | Boubakari Dairou |
| 26 | FW | CMR | Souaibou Marou |
| 27 | FW | CMR | Mohamadou Issa |
| 28 | DF | CMR | Robert Atsiga |
| 29 | FW | CMR | Philippe Nziengui |
| 30 | FW | CMR | Gérald Mbida |
| 31 | FW | CMR | Moshood Kasali |
| 32 | MF | CMR | Jean-Éric Moursou |
| 33 | MF | CMR | Djawal Kaïba |
| 34 | FW | CMR | Daman Bouba Abdouraman |
| 35 | DF | CMR | Siddick Aboubakar |
| 36 | DF | CMR | Marie Mekong |
| 37 | MF | CMR | Brice Éboudjé |
| 38 | MF | CMR | Félix Oukiné |
| 39 | FW | CMR | Moubarak Abdoulaziz |
| 40 | FW | CMR | Jean-Paul Atangana |

== Notable players ==
- (Chad) Marius Mouandilmadji
- (Cameroon) Vincent Aboubakar
- (Cameroon) Frank Anguissa (youth)
- (Niger) Daouda Kamilou

== Notable former coaches ==
- (Cameroon) Jules Nyongha
- (Cameroon) Bonaventure Djonkep (2002–03)
- (Senegal) Lamine Ndiaye (2003–06)
- (France) Denis Lavagne (2007–08)
- (Ivory Coast) Alain Ouombleon (2008–09)
- (France) Denis Lavagne (2009–11)
- (France) Robert Boivin (2012)
- (France) Sébastien Desabre (2012–13)
- (France) Didier Gomes Da Rosa (2014–15)
- (Iran) Ali Hanteh (2022–)
