= Aigle Nkongsamba =

Aigle du Moungo
- Full name: Aigle Royal du Moungo
- Founded: 1932
- Ground: Stade municipal de Nkongsamba, Nkongsamba, Cameroon
- League: MTN Elite One
- 2026: 11th

Aigle Royal du Moungo, earlier Aigle Royal de Nkongsamba, is a Cameroonian professional football club based in Nkongsamba. In 1971, the team won the Cameroon Première Division.

== Achievements ==
- Cameroon Première Division: 2

1971, 1994

== Stadium ==
Currently, the team plays at the Stade municipal de Nkongsamba.

== Performance in CAF competitions ==
- CAF Champions League:

1972 African Cup of Champions Clubs (Second round)
