= PWD Bamenda =

- Nickname: Abakwa Boys
- Founded: 1962; 64 years ago
- Ground: Mankon Municipal Stadium, Bamenda
- Capacity: 5,000
- Chairman: Pascal S. Abunde
- Coach: Tama Wango
- League: Elite One
- 2026: Elite One, 7th
Home colours	Away colours

PWD Bamenda is a Cameroonian football club based in the City of Bamenda, Northwest Region They currently compete in the Elite One, the highest football league in Cameroon.

PWD Bamenda won their maiden domestic and first Elite One title in 2020 after they were crowned champions since the season couldn't be completed due to the effects of thethey also went on to win the Cameroon cup after beating Astres of Douala (1–0) through a free kick transformed by Chem thereby setting them a place for CAF confederations Cup preliminaries.They failed to make it to the playoffs of the league COVID-19 pandemic.

This club has several names among which are P-ton ton and Abakwa boys and is one of the oldest clubs in Cameroon, the flag bearer of the North West Region of Cameroon alongside YOSA their archrivals.

== History ==
On 5 April 2019, the head coach of PWD Bamenda, Augustine Choupo, was kidnapped, held for a few hours and then released unharmed.

== Rivalries ==
Yong Sports Academy is the derby opponent, Canon Yaoundé against whom PWD has lost two Cameroon Cup finals and Coton Sport FC de Garoua

== Stadium ==
The team's official home ground is the 2500 capacity Bamenda Municipal Stadium undergoing some renovation works since 2013. Due to these works, PWD plays home games at the University of Bamenda campus fields and YONG Sports Complexe at Mile 5 Nkwen-Bamenda.

== Supporters ==
Some supporters of PWD Bamenda claim that the club represents the Anglophone Cameroonian population of the country.
