= Léopard Douala =

- Full name: Léopard Sportif de Douala
- Ground: Stade de la Réunification, Douala, Cameroon
- Capacity: 30,000

Léopard Sportif de Douala or simply Léopard Douala is a Cameroonian football club based in Douala.

In 1972, with a squad including Roger Milla, the team won the Cameroon Première Division.

== Achievements ==
- Cameroon Première Division: 3

1972, 1973, 1974

== Stadium ==
Currently the team plays at the Stade de la Réunification.

== See also ==
- 1973 Cameroonian Premier League
