= Caïman Douala =

Caïman de Douala
- Full name: Caïman Akwa Club Douala
- Nickname(s): kpa kum
- Founded: 1927
- Ground: Stade de la Réunification; Douala, Cameroon
- Capacity: 39,000
- League: Elite One
- 2009–10: 1st, Promoted to Elite One
Home colours	Away colours

Caïman de Douala is a football club based in Douala, Cameroon. After some years of absence the team finally returned to the Cameroon Premiere Division in 2007. They were relegated in the 2008–09 season of the Elite One but once again earned promotion back to the top-division after topping the Elite Two league in the 2009–10 season.

== Achievements ==
- Cameroon Premiere Division: 3
  - 1962, 1968, 1975
- Cameroon Championnat Territorial: 7 (Before independence)
  - 1937, 1941, 1943, 1948, 1949, 1950, 1951, 1955
- Cameroon Cup: 4 (Before independence)
  - 1941, 1942, 1943, 1959

== Performance in CAF competitions ==
- CAF Cup Winners' Cup: 1 appearance

1978 – Quarter-Finals
