= Sable FC (Cameroon) =

Association football club in Batié, Cameroon

- Full name: Sable Football Club
- Nickname: San San Boys
- Founded: 1995; 31 years ago
- Ground: Stade de Batié; Batié, Cameroon
- Capacity: 5,000
- Manager: Jose Caetano Mendes
- League: Cameroon Premiere Division
- 2007/08: 11th
- Website: https://sablefcdebatie.com
Home colours

Sable FC is a Cameroonian football club based in Batié founded in 1995. They are a member of the Cameroonian Football Federation and their home stadium is Stade de Batié. They are nicknamed the "San San Boys".

== Honours ==
- Cameroon Première Division
  - Champions (1): 1999
- Cameroon Cup
  - Runners-up (2): 2002, 2003
- Super Coupe Roger Milla
  - Winners (1): 1999

== Performance in CAF competitions ==
- CAF Champions League: 1 appearance

2000 – Group stage/Semi-finals

- CAF Confederation Cup: 1 appearance

2004 – Group stage/Semi-finals
