= Fovu Club =

- Full name: Fovu Club de Baham
- Founded: 1978
- Ground: Stade de Baham; Baham, Cameroon
- Capacity: 7,000
- Manager: Akbar Mohammadi Argi
- League: Elite One
- 2019–20: 7th
Home colours

Fovu Club de Baham is a Cameroonian football club based in Baham. They are a member of the Cameroonian Football Federation. Their home stadium is Stade de Baham. The club is named after the Sacred Cave Fovu, one of the most sacred place.

The club was founded on 17 November 1978.

== Honours ==
- Cameroon Premiere Division: 1

2000.

- Cameroon Cup: 3

2001, 2010, 2023.

- Super Coupe Roger Milla: 1

2001.

== Fovu Club in continental tournaments ==
- CAF Champions League: 1 appearance

2001 – First Round

- CAF Confederation Cup: 1 appearance

2011 – Preliminary Round

- CAF Cup Winners' Cup: 1 appearance

2002 – Second Round
