= Panthère Sportive du Ndé FC =

Panthère du Ndé
- Full name: Panthère Sportive du Ndé Football Club
- Nickname: Nzuimanto
- Founded: 1952; 74 years ago
- Ground: Stade Municipal de Bangangté; Bangangte, Cameroon
- Capacity: 20,000
- Chairman: Serge Tchakounté
- Manager: Christophe Monfoung
- League: Elite One
- 2026: Elite One, 6th
- Website: http://pantheresportivende.com/
Home colours	Away colours

Panthère Sportive du Ndé FC is a football club based in Bangangté, Cameroon. It is a member of the Cameroonian Football Federation.

== Honours ==
- Cameroon Premiere Division:
  - Winners (0): .
  - Runners-up (): .
- Cameroon Cup:
  - Winners (3): 1988, 2009, 2025.
  - Runners-up (2): 2014, 2015.
- Super Coupe Roger Milla:
  - Winners (1): 2025.
  - Runners-up (0): .
- West Division Two Championship
  - Winners (1): 2006.

== Performance in CAF competitions ==
- CAF Confederation Cup: 3 appearances

2010: First Round
2013: First Round
2015: Preliminary Round

- CAF Cup Winners' Cup: 1 appearance

1989: First Round

== Presidents ==
- Célestine Ketcha Courtès
