= Unisport FC de Bafang =

Unisport FC
- Full name: Unisport Football Club de Bafang
- Nickname: Flambeau de l'Ouest
- Founded: 1959
- Ground: Stade Municipal; Bafang, Cameroon
- Capacity: 5,000
- Chairman: Emmanuel Leubou
- Manager: Marcellin Gaha Djiadeu
- League: Cameroon Premiere Division
- 2026: 3rd
Home colours

Unisport Football Club de Bafang is a football club based in Bafang in Cameroon's West Province. They are a member of the Cameroonian Football Federation and play in the Cameroon Premiere Division. The club's colours are yellow and red.

== Honours ==
- Cameroon Première Division: 1

1996

- Cameroon Cup: 1

2012
Runners-up: 2000, 2005, 2011

== Performance in CAF competitions ==
- CAF Champions League: 1 appearance

1997 - Second Round

- CAF Confederation Cup: 3 appearances

2012 - First Round
2013 - Preliminary Round
2015 - Preliminary Round

== Current squad ==
as of 17 June 2019

Head coach
Pierre Ndjili Ndengue
Assistant coach
Roger Tcheuko
Team chef
Marcellin Gaha Djiadeu

Note: Flags indicate national team as defined under FIFA eligibility rules; some limited exceptions apply. Players may hold more than one non-FIFA nationality.

No.	Pos.	Nation	Player
1	MF	CMR	Lionel Ndjomo Ndjana
2	DF	CMR	Gires Tchamake
3	FW	CMR	Raymond Fabrice Fossouo
4	DF	CMR	Rostand Ake
5	DF	CMR	Jean Tchoubia
6	MF	CMR	Gerard Bakinde
7	MF	CMR	Samuel Baha
8	MF	CMR	Kostka Atanga Effa
10	FW	CMR	Joseph Kameni
11	MF	CMR	Aurelien Biong Nyamara
12	MF	CMR	Joseph Eyebe Eyebe
13	MF	CMR	Alexandre Elouna

No.	Pos.	Nation	Player
15	DF	CMR	Alima Ondoua
16	GK	CMR	Rony Happi Nguechue
17	MF	CMR	Albert Ava Koulou
19	DF	CMR	Alain Roger Ndjan
20	MF	CMR	Charly Onana Onana
21	DF	CMR	Michaël Nsoul
22	GK	CMR	Haschou Kerrido
25	DF	CMR	Njoya Mounchili Ilias
28	DF	CMR	Hervé Ayo Ngane
30	MF	CMR	Marcellin Gaha Djiadeu
31	DF	CMR	Bienvenu Stevi M'bon
