= RC Bafoussam =

Cameroonian football club, based in Bafoussam, Cameroon

Racing FC
- Full name: Racing Club de Bafoussam
- Founded: 1950; 76 years ago
- Ground: Stade Municipal de Bamendzi; Bafoussam, Cameroon
- Capacity: 5,000
- Chairman: Pasteur Tchouankeu
- Manager: Jérémy Nguimfack
- League: Elite 2
Home colours

Racing Club de Bafoussam is a Cameroonian football club based in Bafoussam. They are a member of the Cameroonian Football Federation. Their home stadium is Stade Municipal de Bamendzi, a multi-use stadium in Bafoussam with a capacity of 5,000. They are most famous for developing Geremi Njitap.

The club was relegated from the MTN Elite one in 2006.

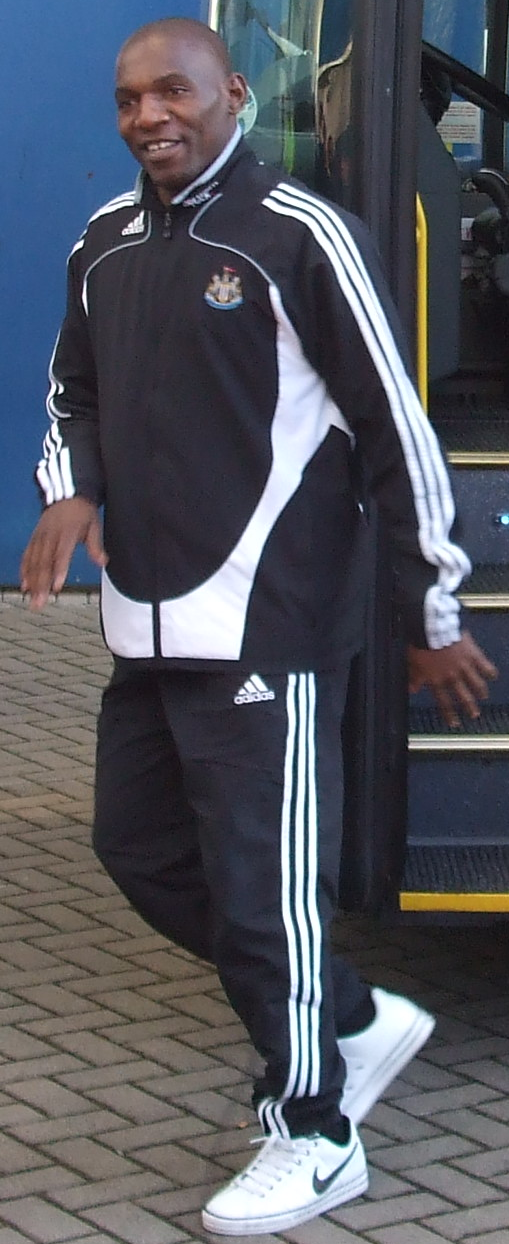
Geremi Njitap played for the club during the 90's.

== Honours ==
- Elite 1
  - Champions (4): 1989, 1992, 1993, 1995
- Elite 2
  - Champions (1): 2020–21
- Cameroon Cup
  - Winners (1): 1996
  - Runners-up (3): 1976, 1988, 1991

== Performance in CAF competitions ==
- CAF Champions League: 5 appearances

2005 - First Round
1990: Quarter-Finals
1993: Second Round
1994: Second Round
1995: withdrew in First Round

- African Cup Winners' Cup: 1 appearance

1997 - disqualified in First Round
