= Tonnerre Yaoundé =

Association football club in Cameroon

Tonnerre
- Full name: Tonnerre Kalara Club of Yaoundé
- Nickname: les Kalara Boys
- Founded: 1934
- Ground: Omnisports Ahmadou-Ahidjo; Yaoundé, Cameroon
- Capacity: 42,500
- Manager: Mehan Abbasian
- League: Elite One
- 2019–20: 17th
Home colours	Away colours

Tonnerre ("Thunder") Kalara Club of Yaoundé is a professional football club based in Yaoundé, Cameroon. The club was most prominent during the 1980s, winning all of their 5 national championships. They have also won the national cup 5 times. Among the club's most notable players have been African player of the Century Roger Milla, Rigobert Song and former FIFA World Player of the Year George Weah.

== Honours ==
- African Cup Winners' Cup: 1

1975

- Cameroon Premiere Division: 5

1981, 1983, 1984, 1987, 1988

- Cameroon Cup: 5

1958, 1974, 1987, 1989, 1991

== Performance in CAF competitions ==
- African Cup of Champions Clubs: 5 appearances

1982: First Round
1984: Second Round
1985: First Round
1988: Second Round
1989: Semi-finals

- CAF Cup: 1 appearance

2002 – Finalist

- CAF Cup Winners' Cup: 4 appearances

1975 – Champion
1976 – Finalist
1990 – First Round
1992 – First Round

== Notable players ==
- (Cameroon) Paul Bahoken
- (Cameroon) Jean II Makoun
- (Cameroon) Bertin Ebwellé
- (Cameroon) Roger Milla (1974 - 1977 & 1990 - 1994)
- (Chad) Japhet N'Doram (1989-1990)
- (Cameroon) Rigobert Song
- (Cameroon) Stephen Tataw (1988-1991)
- (Liberia) George Weah (1987-1988)
- (Cameroon) Morlaye Soumah
- (Liberia) Francis Doe
