= Canon Yaoundé =

Association football club in Cameroon

- Full name: Canon Sportif de Yaoundé
- Nicknames: Kpa-Kum, Mekok Me Ngonda
- Founded: 11 November 1930; 95 years ago
- Ground: Stade Ahmadou Ahidjo
- Capacity: 42,500
- Chairman: François Moudiki
- Manager: Patrice Noukeu
- League: Elite One
- 2026: Elite One, 5th
- Website: https://canon-yde.net/
Home colours	Away colours

Canon Sportif de Yaoundé, commonly known as Canon Yaoundé, is a Cameroonian professional football club based in the capital city of Yaoundé. The club was formed in 1930 and play their games at Stade Ahmadou Ahidjo. Their most successful period was in the 1970s and 1980s when they were a dominant force in Cameroonian and African football, winning eight national championships, eight Cameroonian Cups, three African Champions' Cups and one African Cup Winners' Cup.

Their main rivals are Tonnerre Kalara Club (TKC) of Yaoundé and Union Sportive de Douala. All three clubs were early participants in Cameroonian football and competed in African club competitions during the 1970s– 1980s. Canon and Tonnerre contest the Yaoundé derby. TKC was formed as a breakway faction of Canon. The team was host to top players like captain Theophile Abega, Jean-Paul Akono future coach of gold medal-winning indomitable lions team at the Sydney 2000 Olympic games. The team did not compete in top-flight national or international football for several years due to administrative instability. After changes to its administration and finance, it competed for the MTN Elite One title in the 2020/21 and 2021/22 seasons.

== Recent seasons ==
Season	League									Cup	African competitions		Ref
Season	Division	P	W	D	L	F	A	Pts	Pos	Cup	African competitions		Ref
1999	Div 1	30	13	9	8	42	25	48	4th	W	CAF Cup	SF	
2000	Div 1	29	11	9	9	34	34	42	7th	1/8	African Cup Winners' Cup	RU	
2001	Div 1	30	15	4	11	40	37	49	4th	QF			
2002	Div 1	30	15	10	5	41	22	55	1st	QF			
2003	Div 1	30	15	6	9	40	25	51	2nd	SF	CAF Champions League	GS	
2004	Div 1	30	10	7	13	19	29	37	7th	QF	CAF Champions League	R3	
2004	Div 1	30	10	7	13	19	29	37	7th	QF	CAF Confederation Cup	IR	
2005	Div 1	34	13	12	9	38	29	49	7th	1/8			
2006	Div 1	30	12	13	5	36	21	49	2nd	R1			
2007	Div 1	34	16	6	12	37	26	54	5th	1/8	CAF Champions League	PR	
2007–08	Div 1	30	15	6	9	30	21	51	2nd	1/8			
2008–09	Div 1	26	9	7	10	32	26	34	9th	SF	CAF Champions League	R1	
2009–10	Div 1	26	8	8	10	27	25	32	9th	1/8			

Key
League: P = Matches played; W = Matches won; D = Matches drawn; L = Matches lost; F = Goals for; A = Goals against; Pts = Points won; Pos = Final position;
Cup / International: PR = Preliminary round; QR = Qualifying round; IR = Intermediate round; R1 = First round; R2 = Second round; GS = Group stage; QF = Quarter-final; SF = Semi-final; RU = Runner-up; W = Competition won;

== Honours ==
=== Domestic ===
- Elite One: 10
  - 1970, 1974, 1977, 1979, 1980, 1982, 1985, 1986, 1991, 2002
- Cameroonian Cup: 12
  - Winners: 1957, 1967, 1973, 1975, 1976, 1977, 1978, 1983, 1986, 1993, 1995, 1999
  - Runners-up (5): 1960, 1974, 1980, 1985, 1998
- Super Coupe Roger Milla: 0
  - Runners-up (2): 1999, 2002

=== Continental ===
- CAF Champions League: 3
  - 1971, 1978, 1980
- African Cup Winners' Cup: 1
  - Winners: 1979
  - Runners-up (3): 1977, 1984, 2000

== Notable coaches ==
- Oscar Eyoum (1992–95)
- Bienvenu Lessomo (2009–10)
- Patrice Noukeu (2025–present)
