= 2015 Elite One =

Elite One
- Season: 2015
- Champions: Cotonsport
- Relegated: Njala Quan; Tonnerre
- Champions League: Cotonsport; Union Douala
- Confederation Cup: New Star; UMS de Loum
- Matches: 306
- Goals: 558 (1.82 per match)
- Biggest home win: 2 matches: Les Astres 4-0 Tonnerre (3 May 2015); New Star 4-0 Njala Quan (11 May 2015)
- Biggest away win: 2 matches: Canon 0-3 New Star (29 March 2015); Botafogo FC 0-3 Union Douala (19 July 2015)
- Highest scoring: Les Astres 5-2 Canon (21 May 2015)
- Longest winning run: Botafogo FC (7)
- Longest unbeaten run: Cotonsport; Union Douala (16)
- Longest winless run: Tonnerre (16)
- Longest losing run: Tonnerre (7)

The 2015 Elite One was the 55th season of the Cameroon Top League. The season began on 8 February 2015. Cotonsport won their third consecutive title and 14th overall, all in the last 19 years.

Cotonsport clinched the title in the final round of the season, holding onto their 1-point lead over Union Douala when both teams closed the season with a draw. Union Douala picked up a road point with a 1-1 score at New Star, while Cotonsport played a scoreless home tie against Botafogo FC. With their respective top-two finishes, Cotonsport and Union Douala qualified for the 2016 CAF Champions League. New Star and Botafogo finished in a third-place tie and will play a play-off to determine the 2016 CAF Confederation Cup qualifier.

Canon, Njala Quan and Tonnerre finished 16th, 17th and 18th, respectively and will be relegated to Elite Two for the 2016 season. While there was no doubt about the fates of Njala Quan and Tonnerre, Canon could have escaped relegation with a win in their final game, but played Cosmos de Bafia to a 1-1 draw on the road to seal their fate.

== Teams locations ==
Locations of the 2014 Elite One teams

Elite One was reduced from 19 to 18 teams for the 2015 season with four clubs relegated to Elite Two and only three promoted. Renaissance, Scorpion de Bé, Sable Batié and Douala AC were all relegated to Elite Two after finishing in the last four spot of the 2014 season. Dragon de Yaoundé, Botafogo FC and Lion Blessé were each promoted from Elite Two.

Team	Home city	Stadium	Capacity
APEJES Academy	Yaoundé	Stade Omnisport Ahmadou Ahidjo	38,509
Bamboutos FC	Mbouda	Stade Municipal de Mbouda	11,000
Botafogo FC	Douala	Stade de la Réunification	30,000
Canon Yaoundé	Yaoundé	Stade Omnisport Ahmadou Ahidjo	38,509
Cosmos de Bafia	Bafia	Stade Municipal de Bafia	1,000
Coton Sport FC de Garoua	Garoua	Stade Omnisport Roumdé Adjia	22,000
Dragon de Yaoundé	Yaoundé	Stade Omnisport Ahmadou Ahidjo	38,509
Fovu Club de Baham	Baham	Stade Municipal de Baham	15,000
Les Astres FC	Douala	Stade de la Réunification	30,000
Lion Blessé de Fotouni	Bafang	Stade Municipal de Bafang	5,000
New Star de Douala	Douala	Stade de la Réunification	30,000
Njala Quan Sports Academy	Limbé	Stade Municipal de Limbé	12,000
Panthère du Ndé	Bangangté	Stade Municipal de Bangangté	1,000
Tonnerre Yaoundé	Yaoundé	Stade Omnisport Ahmadou Ahidjo	38,509
UMS de Loum	Njombé	Stade de Njombé	1,000
Union Sportive de Douala	Douala	Stade de la Réunification	30,000
Unisport Bafang	Bafang	Stade Municipal de Bafang	5,000
Yong Sports Academy	Bamenda	Stade Municipal Mankon	5,000

== League table ==
Pos	Team	Pld	W	D	L	GF	GA	GD	Pts	Qualification or relegation
1	Cotonsport (C, Q)	34	18	11	5	43	25	+18	62 (Note: Cotonsport and Tonnerre were each deducted 3 points (Federation decision))	2016 CAF Champions League
2	Union Douala (Q)	34	17	10	7	42	24	+18	61	2016 CAF Champions League
3	New Star (Q)	34	16	10	8	41	23	+18	58 (Note: BFC 1-0 NEW; NEW 1-0 BFC)	2016 CAF Confederation Cup
3	Botafogo FC	34	16	10	8	34	24	+10	58	
5	APEJES Academy	34	13	10	11	33	24	+9	49 (Note: APE 1-1 PAN; PAN 0-0 APE)	
5	Panthère	34	10	19	5	32	27	+5	49	
7	Unisport Bafang	34	12	12	10	33	28	+5	48 (Note: YSA 0-1 UNB; UNB 2-0 YSA)	
8	Yong Sports Academy	34	13	9	12	34	33	+1	48	
9	Dragon de Yaoundé	34	13	7	14	30	33	−3	46	
10	Bamboutos	34	10	14	10	29	31	−2	44	
11	Lion Blessé	34	10	12	12	29	30	−1	42 (Note: LIO 1-1 UMS; UMS 0-0 LIO)	
11	UMS de Loum (Q)	34	9	15	10	28	30	−2	42	2016 CAF Confederation Cup
13	Les Astres	34	11	8	15	35	36	−1	41 (Note: CDB 0-0 AST; AST 2-0 CDB)	
14	Cosmos de Bafia	34	11	8	15	21	28	−7	41	
15	Fovu Club	34	9	13	12	30	36	−6	40	
16	Canon (R)	34	8	14	12	33	41	−8	38	Relegation to Elite Two
17	Njala Quan (R)	34	8	7	19	18	37	−19	31	Relegation to Elite Two
18	Tonnerre (R)	34	3	9	22	13	48	−35	15	Relegation to Elite Two

Updated to match(es) played on 7 September 2015. Source: Soccerway
Rules for classification: 1) points; 2) head-to-head points; 3) head-to-head goal difference; 4) head-to-head goals scored; 5) head-to-head goals allowed; 6) playoff
(C) Champions; (Q) Qualified for the phase indicated; (R) Relegated

== Results ==
All teams play in a double round robin system (home and away).

Home \ Away	APE	BAM	BOT	CAN	CDB	COT	DRA	FOV	AST	LIO	NEW	NJA	PAN	TON	UMS	UND	UNB	YSA
APEJES Academy		2–0	0–1	2–2	2–0	0–1	2–0	1–1	0–1	0–0	2–0	2–0	1–1	1–0	1–1	1–2	2–1	3–0
Bamboutos	0–0		2–1	1–2	1–0	0–0	1–1	1–2	1–0	0–0	0–0	4–1	0–0	3–2	0–0	2–2	2–1	0–1
Botafogo FC	2–1	1–0		3–0	0–0	2–1	2–0	2–0	1–0	0–0	1–0	0–0	0–0	2–0	1–0	0–3	3–2	1–1
Canon	1–2	0–1	1–1		0–1	1–1	0–1	1–0	2–0	1–1	0–3	1–0	1–1	1–1	0–0	3–1	2–2	0–0
Cosmos de Bafia	1–0	2–1	0–1	1–1		0–1	1–2	0–0	0–0	2–0	0–1	1–0	1–2	1–0	0–0	0–2	2–0	2–0
Cotonsport	0–1	1–0	0–0	0–3	1–0		1–0	4–2	3–1	2–1	2–1	2–1	2–1	3–0	4–1	0–0	1–0	2–0
Dragon de Yaoundé	0–2	2–1	1–0	1–0	0–0	1–1		3–1	0–2	2–0	0–0	2–1	0–1	2–1	1–1	2–0	0–1	1–2
Fovu Club	3–2	0–1	0–0	1–1	3–1	2–2	1–0		1–1	0–0	1–1	1–1	1–1	0–1	0–0	2–1	0–1	0–1
Les Astres	1–0	1–2	0–2	5–2	2–0	1–2	0–1	2–3		1–0	1–0	2–0	1–1	4–0	1–0	0–0	2–3	3–2
Lion Blessé	1–0	0–1	3–2	1–1	2–1	1–1	2–1	1–1	1–1		0–0	1–2	0–1	3–0	1–1	1–0	0–1	2–1
New Star	2–0	3–1	1–0	2–0	2–0	2–1	0–0	1–0	2–1	1–0		4–0	4–1	2–2	0–1	1–1	0–0	3–2
Njalla Quan	1–0	0–0	0–1	1–2	0–1	0–0	1–0	1–0	0–2	1–2	0–0		1–1	1–0	2–3	0–1	0–0	0–1
Panthère	0–0	1–1	1–0	2–2	0–0	0–0	1–1	0–0	2–1	2–1	1–0	0–1		2–0	1–1	0–0	1–2	1–1
Tonnerre	0–1	1–1	0–0	0–1	0–1	0–2	0–2	0–0	0–0	0–2	0–1	0–1	2–3		0–0	1–0	2–1	0–1
UMS de Loum	1–1	0–0	2–3	2–0	1–2	0–0	1–2	2–0	0–0	0–0	2–1	1–0	0–2	0–0		1–3	2–0	3–1
Union Douala	0–0	3–0	1–0	1–0	1–0	2–0	2–1	3–2	1–0	2–0	0–1	2–0	2–1	0–0	0–1		3–3	3–1
Unisport Bafang	0–1	0–0	0–0	1–1	0–0	1–2	2–0	0–1	0–0	1–0	1–1	1–0	0–0	3–0	2–0	0–0		2–0
Young Sport Academy	0–0	1–1	4–1	1–1	1–0	0–0	2–0	0–1	3–0	0–1	2–1	1–0	0–0	3–0	1–0	0–0	0–1	

Updated to match(es) played on 7 September 2015. Source: soccerway.com
Legend: Blue = home team win; Yellow = draw; Red = away team win.
