= 2016 Elite One =

Elite One
- Season: 2016
- Champions: UMS de Loum
- Relegated: Botafogo; Cosmos de Bafia; Panthère
- Champions League: Cotonsport; UMS de Loum
- Confederation Cup: Yong Sports Academy; APEJES Academy
- Matches: 306
- Goals: 559 (1.83 per match)
- Biggest home win: 4 matches: APEJES Academy 5-0 Bamboutos (20 March 2016); Cotonsport 5-0 Cosmos de Bafia (19 June 2016); Cotonsport 5-0 Les Astres (21 August 2016); Cotonsport 5-0 Racing (11 September 2016)
- Biggest away win: 2 matches: Cosmos de Bafia 0-4 APEJES Academy (14 August 2016); Cosmos de Bafia 0-4 Union Douala (28 August 2016)
- Highest scoring: 2 matches: Cotonsport 3-4 Aigle Royal (26 June 2016); Eding Sport 4-3 New Star (31 July 2016)
- Longest winning run: Young Sport Academy (5)
- Longest unbeaten run: UMS de Loum (23)
- Longest winless run: Cosmos de Bafia (12)
- Longest losing run: Cosmos de Bafia (7)
- All statistics correct as of 11 September 2016.

The 2016 Elite One was the 56th season of the Cameroon Top League. The season began on 30 January 2016. UMS de Loum dominated the league, winning their first title by a 10-point margin over runner-up Cotonsport. It was a significant turnaround for UMS de Loum, who finished tied for 11th in 2015, just four points away from relegation.

== Teams locations ==
Locations of the 2016 Elite One teams

Elite One consists of 18 teams for the 2016 season with three clubs relegated to Elite Two and three promoted. Fovu Club, Njala Quan and Tonnerre were all relegated to Elite Two after finishing in the last three spots of the 2015 season. Aigle Royal, Eding Sport FC and Racing Club Bafoussam were each promoted from Elite Two.

== League table ==
Pos	Team	Pld	W	D	L	GF	GA	GD	Pts	Qualification or relegation
1	UMS de Loum (C, Q)	34	20	10	4	40	15	+25	70	2017 CAF Champions League
2	Cotonsport (Q)	34	16	12	6	49	23	+26	60	2017 CAF Champions League
3	Yong Sport Academy (Q)	34	16	11	7	31	22	+9	59	2017 CAF Confederation Cup
4	Union Douala	34	13	17	4	40	23	+17	56	
5	Unisport Bafang	34	13	13	8	33	26	+7	52	
6	Aigle Royal	34	11	16	7	28	25	+3	49	
7	Dragon de Yaoundé	34	13	6	15	33	41	−8	45	
8	Eding Sport	34	9	17	8	29	26	+3	44 (Note: EDI: 9 points; AST: 6 points; NEW: 3 points)	
9	Les Astres	34	10	14	10	28	36	−8	44	
10	New Star	34	11	11	12	39	34	+5	44	
11	APEJES Academy (Q)	34	10	13	11	36	32	+4	43 (Note: APE 4-1 RAC; RAC 0-0 APE)	2017 CAF Confederation Cup (Note: APEJES Academy qualified as 2016 Cameroonian Cup winners.)
12	Racing	34	10	13	11	22	27	−5	43	
13	Bamboutos	34	11	8	15	25	33	−8	41	
14	Lion Blessé	34	11	7	16	29	33	−4	40	
15	Canon	34	10	9	15	35	39	−4	36 (Note: Canon was docked 3 points)	
16	Panthère (R)	34	7	14	13	22	28	−6	35	Relegation to Elite Two
17	Botafogo (R)	34	8	9	17	25	36	−11	33	Relegation to Elite Two
18	Cosmos de Bafia (R)	34	4	6	24	16	60	−44	18	Relegation to Elite Two

Updated to match(es) played on 11 September 2016. Source: Soccerway
Rules for classification: 1) points; 2) head-to-head points; 3) head-to-head goal difference; 4) head-to-head goals scored; 5) head-to-head goals allowed; 6) playoff
(C) Champions; (Q) Qualified for the phase indicated; (R) Relegated

== Positions by round ==
Team ╲ Round	1	2	3	4	5	6	7	8	9	10	11	12	13	14	15	16	17	18	19	20	21	22	23	24	25	26	27	28	29	30	31	32	33	34
UMS de Loum	1	5	7	14	9	6	7	11	9	1	2	1	1	1	1	1	1	1	1	1	1	1	1	1	1	1	1	1	1	1	1	1	1	1
Cotonsport	12	11	15	2	3	10	13	6	7	9	5	4	3	4	3	5	6	5	4	5	3	3	3	3	3	3	2	2	2	2	2	2	2	2
Young Sport Academy	1	1	1	7	7	4	6	2	5	11	8	10	10	10	8	6	4	3	2	2	2	2	2	2	2	2	4	3	3	3	3	3	3	3
Union Douala	1	3	9	9	1	1	2	3	2	4	3	2	2	2	2	2	3	4	3	3	4	4	4	5	3	5	5	5	4	4	4	4	4	4
Unisport Bafang	8	5	4	6	7	4	3	8	11	7	7	5	5	6	4	3	2	2	5	6	5	5	5	4	5	4	3	4	4	4	5	5	5	5
Aigle Royal	10	5	6	4	6	3	5	10	6	8	11	12	12	12	13	13	13	12	10	7	7	7	7	8	7	7	7	5	7	7	6	6	6	6
Dragon de Yaoundé	12	17	12	5	12	7	12	15	14	15	14	14	13	15	15	17	15	15	13	14	14	14	16	15	15	16	15	15	14	12	10	8	11	7
Eding Sport	1	3	4	10	15	15	15	17	15	12	10	7	8	8	11	9	10	11	12	10	9	11	11	12	14	13	11	11	10	10	11	10	9	8
Les Astres	12	17	18	16	11	13	10	12	8	10	12	9	9	9	7	8	9	9	9	9	12	10	9	7	9	10	10	10	11	9	9	12	10	9
New Star	1	5	9	1	1	1	1	1	1	2	4	6	6	3	4	3	5	6	6	4	6	6	6	6	6	5	6	7	6	6	7	7	7	10
APEJES Academy	10	13	13	17	18	18	18	16	16	16	16	16	16	17	16	14	14	14	15	13	15	15	14	15	15	15	16	15	16	15	13	13	13	11
Racing	1	1	1	2	3	11	9	5	4	5	6	8	7	7	10	11	7	7	8	11	10	12	10	9	8	7	8	8	8	8	8	9	8	12
Bamboutos	1	9	1	7	10	7	8	9	13	13	14	14	13	13	9	10	11	13	14	15	13	13	12	14	11	9	9	9	9	11	12	11	12	13
Lion Blessé	12	13	17	15	16	17	15	13	17	16	16	16	16	14	14	16	16	17	17	16	17	17	15	13	12	14	14	14	12	13	14	15	14	14
Canon	12	9	11	11	3	12	11	4	3	2	1	3	4	5	6	7	8	10	7	8	8	7	8	11	10	12	13	13	15	16	16	14	15	15
Panthère	12	11	15	13	13	9	3	7	10	6	9	11	11	11	12	12	12	8	11	12	11	9	13	10	13	11	12	12	13	14	15	16	16	16
Botafogo FC	8	13	13	17	13	14	13	14	12	13	13	13	15	17	18	15	17	16	16	17	16	16	17	17	17	17	17	17	17	17	17	17	17	17
Cosmos de Bafia	12	13	8	12	17	15	17	18	18	18	18	18	18	16	16	18	18	18	18	18	18	18	18	18	18	18	18	18	18	18	18	18	18	18

Leader
2017 CAF Champions League or 2017 CAF Confederation Cup
Relegation to Elite Two

Updated to match(es) played on 11 September 2016. Source: Soccerway
