= 2014 Elite One =

Elite One
- Season: 2014
- Matches: 228
- Goals: 430 (1.89 per match)

The 2014 Elite One was the 54th season of the Cameroon Top League.

== Teams locations ==
Locations of the 2014 Elite One teams

Team	Home city	Stadium	Capacity
APEJES Academy	Yaoundé	Stade Omnisport Ahmadou Ahidjo	38,509
Bamboutos FC	Mbouda	Stade Municipal de Mbouda	11,000
Canon Yaoundé	Yaoundé	Stade Omnisport Ahmadou Ahidjo	38,509
Cosmos de Bafia	Bafia	Stade Municipal de Bafia	1,000
Coton Sport FC de Garoua	Garoua	Stade Omnisport Roumdé Adjia	22,000
Douala Athletic Club	Douala	Stade de la Réunification	30,000
Fovu Club de Baham	Baham	Stade Municipal de Baham	15,000
Les Astres FC	Douala	Stade de la Réunification	30,000
New Star de Douala	Douala	Stade de la Réunification	30,000
Njala Quan Sports Academy	Limbé	Stade Municipal de Limbé	12,000
Panthère du Ndé	Bangangté	Stade Municipal de Bangangté	1,000
Renaissance FC de Ngoumou	Yaoundé	Stade Omnisport Ahmadou Ahidjo	38,509
Sable de Batié	Mbouda	Stade Municipal de Mbouda	11,000
Scorpion FC de Bé	Garoua	Stade Omnisport Roumdé Adjia	22,000
Tonnerre Yaoundé	Yaoundé	Stade Omnisport Ahmadou Ahidjo	38,509
UMS de Loum	Njombé	Stade de Njombé	1,000
Union Sportive de Douala	Douala	Stade de la Réunification	30,000
Unisport Bafang	Bafang	Stade Municipal de Bafang	5,000
Yong Sports Academy	Bamenda	Stade Municipal Mankon	5,000

== League table ==
Pos	Team	Pld	W	D	L	GF	GA	GD	Pts	Qualification or relegation
1	Cotonsport (C)	36	23	9	4	57	18	+39	75 (Note: 3 points deducted.)	2015 CAF Champions League
2	Cosmos de Bafia	36	19	9	8	45	33	+12	66	2015 CAF Champions League
3	Unisport Bafang	36	18	11	7	32	21	+11	65	2015 CAF Confederation Cup
4	UMS de Loum	36	19	3	14	32	30	+2	60	
5	APEJES Academy	36	17	8	11	45	40	+5	59	
6	Les Astres	36	17	6	13	47	40	+7	57	
7	New Star	36	17	5	14	39	28	+11	56	
8	Bamboutos	36	16	7	13	34	30	+4	55	
9	Fovu Club	36	12	14	10	31	27	+4	50	
10	Panthère	36	12	11	13	33	29	+4	47	2015 CAF Confederation Cup (Note: As 2014 Cameroonian Cup winners Cotonsport are qualified for CAF Champions League, the CAF Confederation Cup qualification berth reserved for the cup finalist Panthère.)
11	Union Douala	36	12	11	13	42	36	+6	47	
12	Yong Sports Academy	36	9	18	9	25	30	−5	45	
13	Canon	36	12	6	18	34	42	−8	42	
14	Tonnerre	36	12	5	19	39	41	−2	41	
15	Njala Quan	36	9	12	15	26	32	−6	39	
16	Renaissance (R)	36	12	3	21	36	46	−10	39	Relegation to Elite Two
17	Scorpion de Bé (R)	36	11	6	19	35	61	−26	39	Relegation to Elite Two
18	Sable Batié (R)	36	6	14	16	23	48	−25	32	Relegation to Elite Two
19	Douala AC (R)	36	5	8	23	31	53	−22	20	Relegation to Elite Two

Updated to match(es) played on 16 March 2015. Source: https://int.soccerway.com/national/cameroon/elite-one/2014/regular-season/r24018/
Rules for classification: 1) points; 2) goal difference; 3) number of goals scored.
(C) Champions; (R) Relegated
