= 2019–20 Elite One =

Elite One
- Season: 2019–20
- Dates: 18 October 2019 – 16 March 2020
- Champions: PWD Bamenda (first Elite One title)
- Relegated: Dragon Club de Yaoundé
- Champions League: PWD Bamenda
- Confederation Cup: Coton Sport
- Matches: 306
- Goals: 522 (1.71 per match)
- Biggest home win: Coton Sport 6–1 Yong Sports Academy (24 October 2019) Coton Sport 5–0 PWD Bamenda (11 November 2019)
- Biggest away win: Eding Sport 1–5 Feutcheu FC (5 February 2020) Dragon Club 0–4 AS Fortuna (12 March 2020)
- Highest scoring: Colombe Sportive 2–5 Bamboutos (18 October 2019) Coton Sport 6–1 Yong Sports Academy (24 October 2019)
- Longest winning run: Colombe Sportive (5 matches)
- Longest unbeaten run: Bamboutos & Tonnerre Yaoundé (11 matches)
- Longest winless run: AS Fortuna Mfou (12 matches)
- Longest losing run: Tonnerre Yaoundé (6 matches)
- All statistics correct as of 16 March 2020.

The 2019–20 Elite One was the 60th season of the Elite One, the top-tier football league in Cameroon. This was the first season in the Elite One to use an October–May schedule since the 2011–12 season, it was changed so as to conform with the new CAF calendar.

The season started on 18 October 2019 and was scheduled to end on 26 April 2020, but due to the effects of the COVID-19 pandemic, the season was cancelled on 12 May 2020 by FECAFOOT. PWD Bamenda won their first Elite One silverware as they were crowned champions, alongside Coton Sport, they will represent Cameroon at the 2020–21 CAF Champions League and CAF Confederation Cup respectively as the Cameroonian Cup won't hold this year. Only Dragon Club were relegated to the Elite Two as the teams would be increased to twenty teams during the next season. There were no Championship and Relegation group this season.

== Teams ==
Eighteen teams competed in the league, the top 15 teams from the previous season and the three promoted teams from the Elite Two (Bamboutos FC, Canon Sportif and Panthère du Ndé) while (PWD Bamenda, New Star de Douala and Unisport FC de Bafang) relegated from the previous season after finishing last at the playoffs. PWD Bamenda later replaced Les Astres FC.

Coton Sport FC were the defending champions.

Note: Table lists in alphabetical order.

Team	Location	Stadium	Capacity
APEJES Academy	Yaounde	Stade Ahmadou Ahidjo	42,500
AS Fortuna	Yaoundé	Stade Militaire	5,000
Avion du Nkam FC	Douala	Stade Annexe de la Reunification	4,000
Bamboutos FC	Mbouda	Stade de Mbouda	12,000
Canon Sportif	Yaoundé	Stade Ahmadou Ahidjo	42,500
Colombe Sportive	Yaoundé	Stade Annexe 1 Omnisport	2,000
Coton Sport	Garoua	Roumdé Adjia Stadium	30,000
Dragon	Yaoundé	Stade Municipal de Mbalmayo	1,000
Eding Sport FC	Lekié	Lekié Stadium	1,000
Feutcheu FC	Diko-Bandjoun	Arena de Mbouda	2,500
Fovu Club	Baham	Stade de Baham	7,000
Panthère du Ndé	Bangangte	Stade Municipal de Bangangté	2,000
PWD Bamenda	Bamenda	Bamenda Municipal Stadium	5,000
Stade Renard de Melong	Melong	Stade Melong	1,500
Tonnerre Yaoundé	Yaoundé	Stade Ahmadou Ahidjo	42,500
UMS de Loum	Loum	Stade de Njombé	1,000
Union Douala	Douala	Stade de la Réunification	39,000
Yong Sports Academy	Bamenda	Bamenda Municipal Stadium	5,000

== Locations of teams ==
Locations of the 2019–20 Elite One teams

== League table ==
Pos	Team	Pld	W	D	L	GF	GA	GD	Pts	Qualification
1	PWD Bamenda (C, Q)	28	13	8	7	36	28	+8	47	Qualification to the 2020–21 CAF Champions League
2	Coton Sport (Q)	29	12	10	7	39	29	+10	46	Qualification to the 2020–21 CAF Confederation Cup
3	Colombe Sportive	28	12	9	7	33	27	+6	45	
4	Bamboutos	28	9	14	5	30	22	+8	41	
5	Feutcheu	28	11	8	9	31	27	+4	41	
6	Yong Sports Academy	28	11	7	10	39	37	+2	40	
7	Fovu Club	28	11	7	10	29	28	+1	40	
8	Union Douala	28	11	6	11	29	27	+2	39	
9	UMS de Loum	28	10	8	10	23	19	+4	38	
10	Eding Sport FC	29	11	5	13	30	43	−13	38	
11	APEJES Academy	28	8	13	7	30	33	−3	37	
12	Canon Yaoundé	28	10	6	12	30	30	0	36	
13	Stade Renard de Melong	28	9	8	11	28	24	+4	35	
14	AS Fortuna Mfou	28	8	10	10	29	25	+4	34	
15	Panthère du Ndé	28	7	12	9	18	24	−6	33	
16	Avion du Nkam	28	9	6	13	24	34	−10	33	
17	Tonnerre Yaoundé	28	8	8	12	19	22	−3	32	
18	Dragon	28	7	7	14	25	43	−18	28	Relegation to the Elite Two

Updated to match(es) played on 16 March 2020. Source: FECAFOOT
Rules for classification: 1) points; 2) goal difference; 3) number of goals scored.
(C) Champions; (Q) Qualified for the phase indicated

== Results ==
Home \ Away	APE	FOR	AVI	BAM	CAN	COL	COT	DRA	EDS	FEU	FOV	PAN	PWD	STR	TON	UMS	DOU	YSA
APEJES Academy	—	1–1	0–0	1–1	1–1	0–0		3–3	1–3	1–1	2–0	0–1			1–1	2–1	2–1	1–0
AS Fortuna Mfou		—	1–0	2–2	1–0		1–2	1–2	1–2	0–2	3–0		0–0	2–0	1–0	0–2	0–0	4–0
Avion du Nkam	4–2	1–1	—		1–3	0–2			1–0	0–1	1–0	1–0		2–2	2–1	0–1	0–2	3–2
Bamboutos	1–1	0–0	1–0	—	1–1	1–0	2–2		0–1	0–0	2–0	1–1	1–0	1–0	1–2	3–2	2–0	
Canon Yaoundé	0–1		3–0	0–0	—		3–0	4–2	0–1		1–4	1–0	1–2	0–2	0–0	1–0		0–1
Colombe Sportive	0–0	2–1	2–1	2–5	3–2	—	2–0	2–0		2–0	1–1		0–2	0–0	0–0	0–1	1–1	3–1
Coton Sport	1–1		2–1	2–1	1–0	2–1	—	0–1	2–0	1–1	1–2	0–2	5–0	1–1			0–2	6–1
Dragon	1–2	0–4	1–1	0–0	1–1	1–1	0–1	—		1–1	2–0	0–1	2–3	1–0		1–0	0–2	
Eding Sport FC	1–2	2–1		1–0		1–3	2–1	2–0	—	1–5	1–0	2–3	2–1	0–0	0–1	0–0	0–2	1–4
Feutcheu	1–2	1–0	0–1		1–0	0–1	1–1	1–1	3–1	—	2–1		0–3	2–1	0–0	0–1		4–2
Fovu Club	1–0	1–1	1–1	0–0	1–2	3–0	0–2	1–0	2–0	2–0	—	1–0	2–1		2–1	1–0		0–0
Panthère du Ndé	1–1	0–1	0–0	0–0		0–2	0–0	1–2	0–0	2–1		—	1–1	0–0	1–0		1–0	1–3
PWD Bamenda	5–1	1–0	3–0	0–0	0–2		1–1	1–0	3–3			0–0	—		1–1	0–1	1–0	1–0
Stade Renard de Melong	1–0	0–0	0–1		3–1	3–1	1–2		2–0		1–1	2–0	1–1	—	1–2	1–0	1–0	4–1
Tonnerre Yaoundé		2–0		0–0	1–2	0–1	0–1	1–0	1–2	0–0	2–1	0–0	0–1	1–0	—		0–1	1–0
UMS de Loum		2–2	0–1		0–1	0–0	0–0	3–0	1–1	0–1		0–0	0–2	1–0	2–1	—	0–0	2–1
Union Douala	2–1		2–1	1–3	0–0		2–2	1–2	3–0	0–2	1–1	3–0	1–2	1–0	1–0	0–3	—	
Yong Sports Academy	0–0	0–0	1–0	3–1	2–0	1–1	0–0	5–1		2–0		2–2	3–0	2–1		0–0	2–0	—

Updated to match(es) played on 16 March 2020. Source: FECAFOOT
Legend: Blue = home team win; Yellow = draw; Red = away team win.

== See also ==
- 2019–20 Nigeria Professional Football League
