= List of football clubs in Cameroon =

This is a list of association football clubs located in Cameroon. For a complete list see Category:Football clubs in Cameroon

== A ==
- Abakwa Boys
- Aigle Royal Menoua
- Aigle Royal de Moungo
- Ajax Lions FC Likomba
- Akam Sports Academy
- Aljazeera Sports Academy Muyuka
- AS Lausanne de Yaoundé
- AS Matelots
- AS Dobgima
- AS Mbaku kulvert

== B ==
- Bafmeng United
- F.C. Bamenda
- Bang Bullet
- Benakuma FC
- Best Stars Academy
- Bamboutos
- Buea United

== C ==
- Caïman Douala
- Canon Yaoundé
- Coton Sport FC de Garoua

== D ==
- Danay FC
- Destiny Restoration
- Diamant Yaoundé
- Donga United
- Douala Athletic Club
- Dynamo de Douala
- Dream Soccer Academy

== E ==
- Espérance Guider
- Eteki Esoh Memorial Sport Academy FC

== F ==
- Fako United
- Family Warriors
- Fauve Azur
- FC Inter Lion Ngoma
- Fédéral Sporting FC du Noun
- Foncha Street FC
- Fovu Baham
- Foudre Sportive d'Akonolinga
- Foundation Rapheal Foe FC

== H ==
- Hilltop Striker Bamendakwe
- Highland Rangers Santa

== I ==
- Impôts FC
- Isle of Hope Sports Academy

== K ==
- Kadji Sports Academy
- Kilum Mountain FC
- Kumba City FC
- Kumba Lakers
- Kumbo Strikers FC

== L ==
- Livanda Lions FA

== M ==
- Mount Cameroon F.C.
- MAN F.C. D'OBILI

== N ==
- New Star de Douala
- Ngoketunjia United
- Njala Quan Sports Academy
- Nkamanyi Football Initiatives
- Nso United

== O ==
- Olympic Mvolyé
- Oryx Douala

== P ==
- Panthère du Ndé
- PWD Bamenda

== R ==
- Rainbow FC
- Racing Club Bafoussam
- Renaissance FC de Ngoumou
- Rockland FC Belo
- Rush FM FC

== S ==
- Sable FC
- Sahel FC

== T ==
- Tiko United
- Tonnerre Yaoundé
- Tubah United

== U ==
- Union Douala
- Unisport Bafang
- Université FC de Ngaoundéré

== V ==
- Victoria City
- Victoria United FC (OPOPO)
- Vision Athletics Bamenda
- Vision Sports Bamenda

== Order ==
A total of 36 clubs compete in the top two tiers of the football pyramid, divided as follows:

- First Division (Elite One) – 18 clubs
- Second Division (Elite Two) – 18 clubs

Below the top two divisions are ten regional leagues contested by a varying number of clubs:

- Centre Division (Championnat Régional du Centre) – for clubs in the Centre Region
- Littoral Division (Championnat Régional du Littoral) – for clubs in the Littoral Region
- South Division (Championnat Régional du Sud) – for clubs in the South Region
- Southwest Division (Championnat Régional du Sud-Ouest) – for clubs in the Southwest Region
- West Division (Championnat Régional de l'Ouest) – for clubs in the West Region
- East Division (Championnat Régional de l'Est) – for clubs in the East Region
- Far North Division (Championnat Régional du Extrême-Nord) – for clubs in the Far North Region
- Adamawa Division (Championnat Régional de l'Adamaoua) – for clubs in the Adamawa Region
- Northwest Division (Championnat Régional du Nord-Ouest) – for clubs in the Northwest Region
- North Division (Championnat Régional du Nord) – for clubs in the North Region

== First Division: Elite One ==
Club	City / town	Region
Les Astres de Douala	Douala	Littoral
Eding sport Yaoundé	Yaoundé	Centre
Canon de Yaoundé	Yaoundé	Centre
Coton Sport FC	Garoua	North
Stade Renard de Melong	Melong	West
Feutcheu FC	Banjoun	West
Canon de Yaoundé	Yaoundé	Centre
Aigle Royal	Dschang	West
US Douala	Douala	Littoral
Unisport de Bafang	Bafang	West
UMS de loum	Loum	Littoral
Yong Sports Academy	Bamenda	Northwest
Bamboutos de Mbouda	Mbouda	West
Racing de Baffousam	Baffousam	West
New Star de Douala	Douala	Littoral
Lion Blesse de fotouni	Fotouni	Centre
colombe du sud	Ebolowa	sud

== Second Division: Elite Two ==
Club	City / town	Region
Fovu Club	Baham	West
AS Matelots FC	Douala	Littoral
Roumdé Adjia FC	Garoua	North
Apejes FC	Mfou	Centre
Achille FC	Yaoundé	Centre
Njala Quan Sports Academy	Limbe	Southwest
Sahel FC	Maroua	Far North
Tonnerre Kalara Club	Yaoundé	Centre
Douala AC	Douala	Littoral
Avenir FC	Bertoua	East
Aigle Royal de la Menoua	Dschang	West
CNIC UIC de Douala	Douala	Littoral
Mayo Rey FC de Tcholliré	Tcholliré	North
Santos de Koza	Koza	Far North

== Third Division: Regional Leagues ==
Centre Regional League

North West Regional League

Club	City / town
Bagfmeng United	Bafmeng
FC Bamenda	Bamenda
Bang Bullet	Buea
Benakuma FC	
Donga United	Nkambe
Dream Team	Bamenda
Hilltop Strikers	Bamendakwe
Highland Rangers	Santa
Kilum Mountain	
Kumbo Strikers FC	Kumbo
Moghamo S.A.	
Ngoketunjia United	Ndop
Nkwen F.C.	Nkwen, Bamenda
Nso United	Nso
Rainbow FC	Bamenda
Rockland F.C.	Belo
Rush FM FC	Bamenda
Santos F.C.	
Sopocam Rush	
St. Bruice FC	Mbengwi
Tondic	
Tubah United	
Vision Sports	
Vision Athletic	

South West regional League

Club	City / town
Ajax Lions Likomba	
Aljazeera SA	Muyuka
Atess F.A.	
Best Stars Academy	Limbe
Buea United	Buea
Bright Stars F.C.	Kumba
Cinyodev F.A.	Buea
Continental F.A.	
Dream Soccer Academy	Mamfe
Fako United	Buea
Future Dream	Kumba
Istanbul F.A.	Bues
Isle of Hope S.A.	
Jesus F.C.	
Kumba City F.C.	Kumba
Kumba Lakers	Kumba
Legends FA	Kumba
Little Foot	Tiko
Livanda Lions	Tiko
Mt. Cameroon F.C.	Buea
Nemfa Nguti	Nguti
Njala Quan S.A.	Limbe
Options Sport Academy	Limbe
Prisons F.C.	Buea
South West United	
Tiko United	Tiko
Treviso	
Victoria City	Limbe
