= 2017 Elite One =

Elite One
- Season: 2017
- Champions: Eding Sport
- Relegated: RC Bafoussam; Lion Blessé; Canon Yaoundé
- Matches: 127
- Goals: 215 (1.69 per match)
- Biggest home win: 2 matches: Cotonsport 5-1 Canon (31 March 2017); Eding Sport 4-0 New Star (14 May 2017)
- Biggest away win: 3 matches: Canon 0-3 Stade Renard (5 March 2017); Colombe 0-3 UMS de Loum (23 April 2017); Bamboutos 0-3 Eding Sport (30 April 2017)
- Highest scoring: 2 matches: Union Douala 3-3 Young Sport Academy (22 March 2017); Cotonsport 5-1 Canon (31 March 2017)
- Longest winning run: Stade Renard; UMS de Loum (4)
- Longest unbeaten run: Bamboutos (10)
- Longest winless run: Lion Blessé (14)
- Longest losing run: Bamboutos; Canon; Colombe; Les Astres; Lion Blessé (3)
- All statistics correct as of 18 May 2017.

The 2017 Elite One was the 57th season of the Cameroon top-tier football league. The season began on 25 February 2017. UMS de Loum were the defending champions coming off their first league title.

== Teams locations ==
Locations of the 2016 Elite One teams

Elite One consisted of 18 teams for the 2017 season with three clubs relegated to Elite Two and three promoted. Botafogo, Cosmos de Bafia and Panthère were all relegated to Elite Two after finishing in the last three spots of the 2015 season. Colombe, Feutcheu and Stade Renard were each promoted from Elite Two.

== League table ==
Pos	Team	Pld	W	D	L	GF	GA	GD	Pts	Qualification or relegation
1	Eding Sport	34	17	12	5	43	17	+26	63	2018 CAF Champions League
2	Cotonsport	34	15	13	6	50	27	+23	58	2018 CAF Champions League
3	APEJES Academy	34	14	12	8	42	30	+12	54	2018 CAF Confederation Cup
4	Feutcheu	34	14	9	11	42	45	−3	51	
5	Stade Renard	34	11	17	6	26	22	+4	50	
6	Unisport Bafang	34	11	14	9	23	19	+4	47	
7	UMS de Loum	34	11	14	9	27	26	+1	47	
8	Yong Sport Academy	34	12	11	11	30	30	0	47	
9	New Star	34	11	11	12	37	35	+2	44	
10	Dragon de Yaoundé	34	11	11	12	33	39	−6	44	
11	Colombe	34	12	7	15	30	29	+1	43	
12	Union Douala	34	9	16	9	34	35	−1	43	
13	Bamboutos	34	10	13	11	24	26	−2	43	
14	Les Astres	34	11	8	15	31	33	−2	41	
15	Aigle Royal	34	9	13	12	25	31	−6	40	
16	Racing	34	8	15	11	26	40	−14	39	Relegation to Elite Two
17	Lion Blessé	34	5	13	16	13	30	−17	28	Relegation to Elite Two
18	Canon	34	5	11	18	19	41	−22	26	Relegation to Elite Two

Updated to match(es) played on 24 Oct 2017. Source:
Rules for classification: 1) points; 2) head-to-head points; 3) head-to-head goal difference; 4) head-to-head goals scored; 5) head-to-head goals allowed; 6) playoff

== Positions by round ==
Team ╲ Round	1	2	3	4	5	6	7	8	9	10	11	12	13	14	15	16	17	18	19	20	21	22	23	24	25	26	27	28	29	30	31	32	33	34
Eding Sport	1	1	1	1	1	1	2	2	1	2	2	1	1	1	1																			
Stade Renard	12	7	3	3	5	4	5	3	3	1	1	2	2	2																				
UMS de Loum	10	3	5	5	4	2	1	1	1	2	2	3	3	3																				
APEJES Academy	10	14	8	9	10	5	6	4	4	5	5	4	4	4																				
Dragon de Yaoundé	1	1	1	3	2	3	3	5	6	4	6	6	5	5																				
Young Sport Academy	12	18	18	18	18	10	14	15	12	12	10	9	8	5																				
Union Douala	8	3	7	8	7	8	7	11	11	13	12	10	10	7																				
Unisport Bafang	12	7	13	10	10	12	10	7	10	10	7	7	6	7																				
Cotonsport	1	3	12	14	14	8	3	5	6	7	7	8	7	9																				
Bamboutos	12	14	16	15	15	13	12	9	4	5	4	5	9	10																				
Feutcheu	1	7	9	10	10	14	13	10	14	16	13	13	13	11																				
Les Astres	1	7	3	2	2	7	8	12	9	9	14	13	10	12																				
Colombe	8	14	6	7	9	16	15	16	16	14	15	15	15	13																				
Aigle Royal	1	7	11	13	5	6	9	13	13	11	10	11	12	14																				
Canon	1	3	9	10	10	11	11	8	8	8	9	11	13	15																				
Racing	12	12	14	6	7	14	16	14	15	15	15	15	15	15																				
New Star	12	12	14	15	15	18	16	17	17	17	17	17	17	17																				
Lion Blessé	12	14	16	15	15	16	18	18	18	18	18	18	18	18																				

Leader
2017 CAF Champions League or 2017 CAF Confederation Cup
Relegation to Elite Two

Updated to match(es) played on 18 May 2017. Source: Soccerway
