= 2010–11 Elite One =

MTN Elite 1
- Season: 2010–11
- 2012 CAF Champions League: Cotonsport Garoua; Les Astres FC
- 2012 CAF Confederation Cup: Union Douala; Unisport Bafang (cup finalist)

The 2010–11 MTN Elite 1 was the 51st season of the Cameroonian Premier League, the top football division in Cameroon.

== Team changes ==
=== Promoted to 2010–11 Elite One ===
- Lausanne Youandé
- Scorpion FC
- Caïman Douala

=== Relegated from 2009–10 Elite One ===
- AS Matelots
- Fovu Baham
- Roumdé Adjia FC

== Clubs ==
Team	City / Town	Stadium	Capacity	Position in 2009–10
Caïman Douala	Douala	Stade de la Réunification	30,000	2nd, MTN Elite Two
Canon Yaoundé	Yaoundé	Stade Ahmadou Ahidjo	52,000	9th
Cotonsport Garoua	Garoua	Stade Roumdé Adjia	22,000	1st
Lausanne Yaoundé	Yaoundé	Stade Ahmadou Ahidjo	52,000	1st, MTN Elite Two
Les Astres FC	Douala	Stade de la Réunification	30,000	2nd
Panthère du Ndé	Bangangté	Stade Municipal de Bangangté	20,000	4th
Renaissance Ngoumou	Ngoumou	Stade Municipal de Ngoumou	5,000	8th
Sable FC	Batié	Stade de Batié	5,000	11th
Scorpion FC	Garoua	Stade Omnisport Roumdé Adjia	22,000	3rd, MTN Elite Two
Tiko United	Tiko	Stade de Moliko	8,000	3rd
Union Douala	Douala	Stade de la Réunification	30,000	7th
Unisport Bafang	Bafang	Stade Municipal de Bafang	5,000	6th
Université FC	Ngaoundéré	Stade Ndoumbe Oumar	10,000	10th
YOSA	Bamenda	Stade de Bamenda	5,000	5th

== League table ==
Pos	Team	Pld	W	D	L	GF	GA	GD	Pts	Qualification or relegation
1	Cotonsport Garoua (C)	26	16	8	2	48	17	+31	56	Qualification for 2012 CAF Champions League
2	Les Astres Douala	26	14	3	9	29	26	+3	45	Qualification for 2012 CAF Champions League
3	Union Douala	26	12	6	8	26	19	+7	42	Qualification for 2012 CAF Confederation Cup
4	Unisport Bafang	26	12	5	9	26	20	+6	41	Qualification for 2012 CAF Confederation Cup
5	YOSA	26	11	7	8	17	17	0	40	
6	Tiko United	26	10	9	7	33	27	+6	39	
7	Sable Batié	26	8	12	6	22	16	+6	36	
8	Canon Yaoundé	26	10	6	10	36	30	+6	36	
9	Panthère Ndé	26	9	8	9	28	26	+2	35	
10	Renaissance Ngoumou	26	9	6	11	25	33	−8	33	
11	Scorpion FC de Bé	26	8	9	9	25	29	−4	33	
12	Université Ngaoundéré (R)	26	8	8	10	20	24	−4	32	Relegation to MTN Elite Two
13	Caïman Douala (R)	26	6	7	13	24	35	−11	25	Relegation to MTN Elite Two
14	Lausanne Yaoundé (R)	26	0	4	22	9	49	−40	4	Relegation to MTN Elite Two

Updated to match(es) played on 26 July 2011. Source: FIFA.com, RSSSF, Soccerway.com
Rules for classification: 1) points; 2) goal difference; 3) number of goals scored.
(C) Champions; (R) Relegated
