= 2009–10 Elite One =

MTN Elite 1
- Season: 2009–10
- 2011 CAF Champions League: Cotonsport Garoua; Les Astres FC
- 2011 CAF Confederation Cup: Tiko United; Fovu Baham (cup winner)

The 2009–10 MTN Elite 1 was the 50th season of the Cameroonian Premier League, the top football division in Cameroon.

== Clubs ==
Team	City / Town	Stadium	Capacity	Position in 2008–09
Canon Yaoundé	Yaoundé	Stade Ahmadou Ahidjo	52,000	9th
Cotonsport Garoua	Garoua	Stade Roumdé Adjia	22,000	3rd
Fovu Baham	Baham	Stade de Baham	7,000	5th
Les Astres FC	Douala	Stade de la Réunification	30,000	4th
AS Matelots	Douala	Stade de la Réunification	30,000	8th
Panthère du Ndé	Bangangté	Stade Municipal de Bangangté	20,000	7th
Roumdé Adjia FC	Garoua	Roumdé Adjia Stadium	35,000	1st: Division Two - Zone 1
Renaissance Ngoumou	Ngoumou	Stade Municipal de Ngoumou	5,000	1st: Division Two - Zone 2
Sable FC	Batié	Stade de Batié	5,000	11th
Tiko United	Tiko	Stade de Moliko	8,000	1st
Union Douala	Douala	Stade de la Réunification	30,000	2nd
Unisport Bafang	Bafang	Stade Municipal de Bafang	5,000	6th
Université FC	Ngaoundéré	Stade Ndoumbe Oumar	10,000	10th
YOSA	Bamenda	Stade de Bamenda	5,000	1st: Division Two - Zone 3

== League table ==
Pos	Team	Pld	W	D	L	GF	GA	GD	Pts	Qualification or relegation
1	Cotonsport Garoua (C, Q)	26	17	5	4	50	20	+30	56	Qualification for 2011 CAF Champions League
2	Les Astres Douala (Q)	26	14	7	5	37	21	+16	49	Qualification for 2011 CAF Champions League
3	Tiko United (Q)	26	13	6	7	29	21	+8	45	Qualification for 2011 CAF Confederation Cup
4	Panthère Ndé	26	10	11	5	28	24	+4	41	
5	YOSA	26	8	12	6	26	17	+9	36	
6	Unisport Bafang	26	10	6	10	26	25	+1	36	
7	Union Douala	26	8	10	8	33	29	+4	34	
8	Renaissance Ngoumou	26	10	4	12	23	30	−7	34	
9	Canon Yaoundé	26	8	8	10	27	25	+2	32	
10	Université Ngaoundéré	26	8	8	10	18	25	−7	32	
11	Sable Batié	26	8	7	11	18	27	−9	31	
12	Fovu Baham (Note: Fovu Baham also qualified to the 2011 CAF Confederation Cup as cup winner.) (R, Q)	26	7	9	10	23	26	−3	30	Relegation to MTN Elite Two
13	AS Matelots (R)	26	7	4	15	22	42	−20	25	Relegation to MTN Elite Two
14	Roumdé Adjia (R)	26	4	3	19	21	49	−28	15	Relegation to MTN Elite Two

Updated to match(es) played on 6 June 2010. Source: FIFA.com, RSSSF
Rules for classification: 1) points; 2) goal difference; 3) number of goals scored.
(C) Champions; (Q) Qualified for the phase indicated; (R) Relegated

== Results ==
Home \ Away	CAN	CSG	FOV	AST	MAT	PAN	RAG	REN	SAB	TIK	UND	USB	UNN	YSA
Canon Yaoundé		0–2	2–1	0–0	3–0	1–1	6–2	1–2	2–0	1–2	0–0	0–1	1–0	2–1
Cotonsport Garoua	1–1		5–2	1–0	5–0	4–1	3–0	2–1	2–1	2–0	2–1	4–2	2–0	2–1
Fovu Baham	1–0	2–0		2–1	1–1	0–2	2–1	2–1	0–1	0–0	0–1	1–1	1–0	0–0
Les Astres Douala	2–1	1–3	2–0		5–2	3–2	1–1	3–0	4–0	2–0	1–1	2–1	2–1	0–0
AS Matelots	1–3	0–1	1–0	0–1		2–3	3–0	1–0	1–2	1–1	1–0	0–1	2–1	1–5
Panthère Ndé	1–0	0–0	0–0	0–2	2–0		1–0	2–0	1–1	1–1	0–0	1–0	0–0	0–0
Roumdé Adjia	0–1	1–1	1–2	1–0	1–0	2–5		0–1	2–4	1–0	0–3	0–1	0–1	2–0
Renaissance Ngoumou	2–2	1–0	0–3	1–0	0–0	1–1	3–2		3–0	0–1	1–0	0–1	1–2	0–3
Sable Batié	1–1	0–0	1–0	0–0	1–0	1–0	1–0	1–2		0–0	2–0	0–2	0–1	0–2
Tiko United	1–0	1–2	2–1	2–2	1–0	4–0	3–1	1–0	1–0		2–1	0–2	2–0	1–0
Union Douala	0–0	2–5	2–2	0–1	1–2	0–0	2–1	3–2	1–1	2–1		3–1	5–0	2–2
Unisport Bafang	2–0	1–1	1–1	1–2	1–2	1–2	0–0	2–1	0–2	0–1	1–1		2–0	0–0
Université Ngaoundéré	0–0	1–0	1–1	0–0	1–1	0–1	3–1	0–0	2–0	1–1	2–1	0–1		1–0
YOSA	1–1	0–1	0–0	2–0	2–0	1–1	2–1	1–1	0–0	1–0	1–1	1–0	0–0	

Updated to match(es) played on 6 June 2010. Source:
Legend: Blue = home team win; Yellow = draw; Red = away team win.
