= 2022–23 Elite One =

Elite One
- Season: 2022–23
- Champions: Coton Sport
- Relegated: Eding Sport; Yafoot; Dragon de Yaoundé; Djiko; Renaissance
- Champions League: Coton Sport
- Matches: 226
- Goals: 482 (2.13 per match)
- Highest attendance: 27,634

The 2022–23 Elite One was a season of the Elite One, the top-tier football league in Cameroon.

Coton Sport FC won their third consecutive title and 18th overall after winning all three games in the championship stage, including a 2–0 win over Canon Yaoundé on the final match day to clinch the title.

Avion Academy escaped relegation after a ruling saw them awarded three points in their match against UMS de Loum after UMS fielded an ineligible player, relegating Djiko in Group A.

YOSA de Bamenda defeated Eding Sport 2–0 in the relegation playoff to remain in Elite One.

== League Table ==
The league was divided into two groups of 11 teams. The top two teams in each group qualified for the championship stage.

=== Group A ===
Pos	Team	Pld	W	D	L	GF	GA	GD	Pts	Qualification or relegation
1	Canon Yaoundé	20	10	8	2	31	14	+17	38	Qualification to the Championship Round
2	Coton Sport FC	20	10	6	4	21	13	+8	36	Qualification to the Championship Round
3	UMS de Loum	20	10	4	6	21	21	0	34	
4	PWD Bamenda	20	7	4	9	18	18	0	25	
5	Avion Academy	20	7	4	9	23	28	−5	25	
6	Aigle Royal	20	6	6	8	16	22	−6	24	
7	Stade Renard	20	6	6	8	15	17	−2	24	
8	Colombe	20	5	8	7	17	19	−2	23	
9	Eding Sport (Q, R)	20	5	8	7	12	15	−3	23	Qualification to the Relegation Playoff
10	Djiko (R)	20	5	8	7	20	21	−1	23	Relegation
11	Renaissance (R)	20	6	4	10	18	24	−6	22	Relegation

Source: soccerway.com
Rules for classification: 1) points; 2) goal difference; 3) number of goals scored.
(Q) Qualified for the phase indicated; (R) Relegated

=== Group B ===
Pos	Team	Pld	W	D	L	GF	GA	GD	Pts	Qualification or relegation
1	Gazelle FA	20	10	5	5	27	18	+9	35	Qualification to the Championship Round
2	Bamboutos	20	9	7	4	21	12	+9	34	Qualification to the Championship Round
3	APEJES Academy	20	10	4	6	32	24	+8	34	
4	Fovu Club	20	9	4	7	24	19	+5	31	
5	Les Astres	20	7	6	7	23	29	−6	27	
6	Union Douala	20	6	9	5	18	17	+1	27	
7	Fauve Azur Elite	20	7	6	7	23	23	0	27	
8	Fortuna Mfou	20	6	8	6	25	29	−4	26	
9	YOSA (Q, O)	20	6	6	8	20	21	−1	24	Qualification to the Relegation Playoff
10	Yafoot (R)	20	6	4	10	24	30	−6	22	Relegation
11	Dragon de Yaoundé (R)	20	1	7	12	19	34	−15	10	Relegation

Source: soccerway.com
Rules for classification: 1) points; 2) goal difference; 3) number of goals scored.
(O) Play-off winners; (Q) Qualified for the phase indicated; (R) Relegated

=== Championship Round ===
Pos	Team	Pld	W	D	L	GF	GA	GD	Pts	Qualification or relegation
1	Coton Sport FC (C)	3	3	0	0	4	0	+4	9	Champions, Qualification to the 2023–24 CAF Champions League
2	Bamboutos FC	3	2	0	1	6	3	+3	6	
3	Canon Yaoundé	3	1	0	2	3	4	−1	3	
4	Gazelle FA	3	0	0	3	1	7	−6	0	

Source: soccerway.com
Rules for classification: 1) points; 2) goal difference; 3) number of goals scored.
(C) Champions

=== Relegation Play-off ===
19 May 2023

Eding Sport	0–2	YOSA
		Franck Eric Embe '72, Ako Calistus '90

Stade de Bonamoussadi, Douala
