= 2019 Elite One =

Elite One
- Season: 2019
- Champions: UMS de Loum

The 2019 Elite One was the 59th season of Elite One, the top-tier football league in Cameroon. The season started on 2 February 2019. UMS de Loum won the 2019 Elite One.

== First stage ==
=== Group A ===
Pos	Team	Pld	W	D	L	GF	GA	GD	Pts	Qualification or relegation
1	Coton Sport FC	16	8	5	3	30	11	+19	29	Qualification for Championship playoff
2	Dragon Club	16	7	5	4	23	14	+9	26	Qualification for Championship playoff
3	APEJES Academy	16	7	4	5	20	18	+2	25	Qualification for Championship playoff
4	Tonnerre Yaoundé	16	6	4	6	16	20	−4	22	
5	Colombe Sportive	16	5	5	6	15	20	−5	20	
6	Avion du Nkam FC	16	5	5	6	18	16	+2	20	
7	Union Sportive Douala	16	5	4	7	11	14	−3	19	Qualification for Relegation playoff
8	PWD Bamenda	16	5	4	7	13	17	−4	19	Qualification for Relegation playoff
9	New Star de Douala	16	4	4	8	13	29	−16	16	Qualification for Relegation playoff

Source: Soccerway

=== Group B ===
Pos	Team	Pld	W	D	L	GF	GA	GD	Pts	Qualification or relegation
1	Feutcheu FC	16	7	7	2	16	11	+5	28	Qualification for Championship playoff
2	Stade Renard de Melong	16	6	8	2	10	7	+3	26	Qualification for Championship playoff
3	UMS de Loum	16	5	7	4	12	9	+3	22	Qualification for Championship playoff
4	Yong Sports Academy	16	4	9	3	9	8	+1	21	
5	AS Fortuna	16	4	7	5	16	15	+1	19	
6	Eding Sport FC	16	3	10	3	12	14	−2	19	
7	Les Astres FC	16	4	4	8	13	17	−4	16	Qualification for Relegation playoff
8	Unisport FC de Bafang	16	2	10	4	9	10	−1	16	Qualification for Relegation playoff
9	Fovu Club	16	3	6	7	13	19	−6	15	Qualification for Relegation playoff

Source: Soccerway

== Championship playoff ==
Pos	Team	Pld	W	D	L	GF	GA	GD	Pts	Qualification or relegation
1	UMS de Loum (C)	5	3	1	1	4	1	+3	10	Qualification for Champions League
2	Coton Sport FC	5	2	3	0	6	3	+3	9	
3	Feutcheu FC	5	2	0	3	4	4	0	6	
4	APEJES Academy	5	1	3	1	5	6	−1	6	
5	Dragon Club	5	1	2	2	4	5	−1	5	
6	Stade Renard de Melong (Q)	5	1	1	3	3	7	−4	4	Qualification for Confederation Cup (Note: Stade Renard de Melong are Cameroonian Cup winners.)

Source: Soccerway
(C) Champions; (Q) Qualified for the phase indicated

== Relegation playoff ==
Pos	Team	Pld	W	D	L	GF	GA	GD	Pts	Qualification or relegation
1	Fovu Club	5	3	1	1	7	3	+4	10	
2	Les Astres FC	5	3	1	1	4	1	+3	10	
3	Union Sportive Douala	5	2	2	1	3	2	+1	8	
4	PWD Bamenda (R)	5	1	4	0	4	3	+1	7	Relegation
5	New Star de Douala (R)	5	1	1	3	6	7	−1	4	Relegation
6	Unisport FC de Bafang (R)	5	0	1	4	1	9	−8	1	Relegation

Source: Soccerway
(R) Relegated

== Attendances ==
#	Football club	Average attendance
1	Coton Sport FC	2,253
2	Union de Douala	2,102
3	Dragon Club	1,198
4	UMS de Loum	1,104
5	Stade Renard FC	1,047
6	APEJES	902
7	Tonnerre de Yaoundé	854
8	Feutcheu FC	806
9	Colombe Sportive	749
10	Les Astres FC	642
11	YOSA	631
12	PWD Bamenda	502
13	AS Fortuna	471
14	Fovu Club	451
15	Avion FC	397
16	Eding Sport FC	353
17	New Star FC	252
18	Unisport FC	199
