= Raphaël Messi Bouli =

Cameroonian footballer

Messi Bouli
Personal information
- Full name: Raphaël Éric Messi Bouli
- Date of birth: 23 April 1992 (age 34)
- Place of birth: Yaoundé, Cameroon
- Height: 1.86 m (6 ft 1 in)
- Position: Striker

Team information
- Current team: Punjab

Senior career*
Years	Team	Apps	(Gls)
2013	FAP Yaoundé		
2014–2015	Canon Yaoundé		
2016–2018	APEJES	24	(14)
2018–2019	Yanbian Funde	3	(3)
2019	Foolad	1	(1)
2019–2020	Kerala Blasters	17	(8)
2020	Heilongjiang Lava Spring	9	(0)
2021	Liaoning Shenyang Urban	0	(0)
2021	→ Nanjing City (loan)	32	(15)
2022–2023	Nanjing City	59	(27)
2024	Shijiazhuang Gongfu	27	(14)
2025	East Bengal	5	(2)
2025–2026	Jamshedpur	13	(2)
2026–	Punjab	2	(3)

International career^{‡}
2013–2018	Cameroon	6	(1)
- * Club domestic league appearances and goals as of 26 October 2026 ‡ National team caps and goals as of 24 January 2018

Raphaël Éric Messi Bouli (born 23 April 1992) is a Cameroonian professional footballer who plays as a forward for Indian Super League club Punjab.

== Club career ==
Bouli started his career in Cameroon with FAP Yaoundé in 2013. A year later, he signed for Canon Yaoundé where he remained for the 2014 and 2015 Elite One seasons. 2016 saw Bouli join APEJES, with whom he won the 2016 Cameroonian Cup with. In 2017, Bouli scored fourteen goals in twenty-four league fixtures. On 1 March 2018, Bouli joined China League One side Yanbian Funde. He made his debut against Nei Mongol Zhongyou on 1 April, prior to netting in back-to-back matches in May versus Qingdao Huanghai and Zhejiang Greentown respectively. Bouli moved to Iran to play for Foolad of the Persian Gulf Pro League in 2019.

Bouli departed Foolad in June 2019, after scoring one goal (against Esteghlal Khuzestan) in twelve games for the Iranian club. In the months following his departure, Bouli threatened to complain to FIFA, along with then-manager Afshin Ghotbi and former teammate Takafumi Akahoshi, regarding unpaid wages.

On 24 August, Bouli completed a move to India with Super League team Kerala Blasters. He scored eight goals for them, which included a brace over Jamshedpur on 13 December.

September 2020 saw Bouli return to Chinese football as he agreed terms with League One team Heilongjiang Lava Spring.

In April 2021, Bouli joined Nanjing City on loan, he completed a permanent transfer to the club in April 2022. As of the 2023 season, he scored 42 goals and provided 4 assists in 93 appearances for the club.

On 29 February 2024, Bouli joined fellow China League One club Shijiazhuang Gongfu.

After a six-month stint back in the ISL with East Bengal, Bouli joined fellow ISL club Jamshedpur on 4 October 2025, signing a contract for the 25–26 season.

== International career ==
Bouli made his international debut on 10 August 2013, playing in a 2014 African Nations Championship qualifier with Gabon. Years later, he scored his first goal in 2018 African Nations Championship qualifying in a game with São Tomé and Príncipe. In November 2017, Bouli was selected by the national team for a 2018 FIFA World Cup qualifier against Zambia. However, he failed to feature after remaining on the bench for a 2–2 draw. Months later, Bouli was called up to the squad for the 2018 African Nations Championship in Morocco. He featured in matches against Congo, Angola and Burkina Faso as Cameroon were eliminated at the group stages.

== Career statistics ==
=== Club ===
As of match played 20 April 2025

Appearances and goals by club, season and competition
Club	Season	League			Cup		Continental		Other		Total	
Club	Season	Division	Apps	Goals	Apps	Goals	Apps	Goals	Apps	Goals	Apps	Goals
APEJES	2017	Elite One	24	14	0	0	—		—		24	14
Yanbian Funde	2018	China League One	14	3	0	0	—		—		14	3
Foolad	2018–19	Persian Gulf Pro League	12	1	0	0	—		—		12	1
Kerala Blasters	2019–20	Indian Super League	17	8	0	0	—		—		17	8
Heilongjiang Lava Spring	2020	China League One	7	0	—		—		2 (Note: Appearances in China League One relegation play-offs)	0	9	0
Nanjing City (loan)	2021	China League One	32	15	0	0	—		—		32	15
Nanjing City	2022	China League One	31	17	2	0	—		—		33	17
Nanjing City	2023	China League One	28	11	0	0	—		—		28	11
Nanjing City	Total		91	43	2	0	0	0	0	0	93	43
Shijiazhuang Gongfu	2024	China League One	27	14	1	0	—		—		28	14
East Bengal	2024–25	Indian Super League	5	2	1 (Note: Appearance(s) in Super Cup)	0	2 (Note: Appearance(s) in AFC Challenge League)	1	—		8	3
Career total			197	83	4	0	2	1	2	0	205	74

=== International ===
As of 7 October 2020.

National team	Year	Apps	Goals
Cameroon	2013	1	0
Cameroon	2017	2	1
Cameroon	2018	3	0
Total		6	1

As of 14 July 2019. Cameroon score listed first.

International goals by date, venue, cap, opponent, score, result and competition
No.	Date	Venue	Cap	Opponent	Score	Result	Competition
1	19 August 2017	Limbe Stadium, Limbe, Cameroon	1	São Tomé and Príncipe	2–0	2–0	2018 African Nations Championship qualification

== Honours ==
APEJES

- Cameroonian Cup: 2016
