= Bil Nsongo =

Cameroonian footballer

Personal information
- Full name: Bil Dornol Nsongo Tonfack
- Date of birth: 21 September 2004 (age 22)
- Place of birth: Yaoundé, Cameroon
- Height: 1.82 m (6 ft 0 in)
- Position: Forward

Team information
- Current team: Deportivo A Coruña
- Number: 32

Youth career
- ANAFOOT

Senior career*
Years	Team	Apps	(Gls)
2022–2023	Lausanne de Yaoundé	12	(9)
2024	Canon Yaoundé		
2024–2026	Deportivo B	50	(17)
2025–	Deportivo A Coruña	24	(6)

International career^{‡}
2023	Cameroon U20	3	(1)
2026–	Cameroon	4	(2)
- * Club domestic league appearances and goals as of 20 September 2026 ‡ National team caps and goals as of 12 November 2026

Bil Dornol Nsongo Tonfack (born 21 September 2004) is a Cameroonian professional footballer who plays as a forward for Spanish club Deportivo A Coruña and the Cameroon national team.

== Club career ==
Born in Yaoundé, Nsongo played for Académie Nationale de Football (ANAFOOT) before making his senior debut with AS Lausanne de Yaoundé in the Elite Two, scoring nine goals in just 12 matches. After attracting interest from Turkish clubs and trials at Enyimba FC and Amiens SC, he signed for Canon Yaoundé in January 2024.

On 16 August 2024, Nsongo moved abroad and joined Spanish club Deportivo de La Coruña on a one-year deal, being initially assigned to the reserves in Segunda Federación. After an inconsistent first season, he was initially set for release, but after expressing his desire to stay, the club activated the one-year extension on his contract.

Nsongo made his first team debut with Dépor on 4 December 2025, coming on as a second-half substitute for Zakaria Eddahchouri in a 2–0 away win over CE Sabadell FC, for the campaign's Copa del Rey. He made his professional debut twelve days later, replacing Cristian Herrera in a 1–0 home success over RCD Mallorca, also for the national cup.

Nsongo scored his first professional goal on 1 March 2026, netting the equalizer in a 3–2 away win over Real Sociedad B. He subsequently established himself as a starter for Deportivo, and scored a brace in a 2–0 away win over Real Valladolid which ensured the club's promotion to La Liga on 24 May.

On 12 June 2026, Nsongo renewed his link with the club – now named Deportivo de A Coruña – until 2030, being a permanent member of the main squad. He made his top tier debut on 17 August, starting in a 1–1 home draw against Elche CF.

== International career ==
In June 2023, Nsongo was called up to the Cameroon national under-20 team for the 2023 Jeux de la Francophonie.

== Career statistics ==
=== Club ===
As of match played 20 September 2026

Appearances and goals by club, season and competition
Club	Season	League			National cup		Other		Total	
Club	Season	Division	Apps	Goals	Apps	Goals	Apps	Goals	Apps	Goals
Lausanne de Yaoundé	2022–23	Elite Two	12	9	—		—		12	9
Deportivo B	2024–25	Segunda Federación	30	5	—		1 (Note: Appearance in 2025 Segunda Federación play-offs)	0	31	5
Deportivo B	2025–26	Segunda Federación	20	12	—		—		20	12
Deportivo B	Total		50	17	—		1	0	51	17
Deportivo A Coruña	2025–26	Segunda División	17	6	3	0	—		20	6
Deportivo A Coruña	2026–27	La Liga	7	0	0	0	—		7	0
Deportivo A Coruña	Total		24	6	3	0	—		27	6
Career total			86	32	3	0	1	0	90	32

=== International ===
As of match played 12 November 2026

Appearances and goals by national team and year
National team	Year	Apps	Goals
Cameroon	2026	4	2
Total		4	2

As of match played 12 November 2026
Scores and results list Cameroon's goal tally first, score column indicates score after each Nsongo goal.

List of international goals scored by Bil Nsongo
No.	Date	Venue	Opponent	Score	Result	Competition
1	3 October 2026	Alassane Ouattara Stadium, Abidjan, Ivory Coast	Ivory Coast	1–0	1–0	Friendly
2	12 November 2026	Japoma Stadium, Douala, Cameroon	Namibia	2–0	2–0	2027 Africa Cup of Nations qualification

== Honours ==
Cameroon U20

- Jeux de la Francophonie: 2023
