= Basile Yamkam =

Cameroonian footballer

Personal information
- Full name: Mbouri A Basile Yamkam
- Date of birth: 2 January 1998 (age 28)
- Place of birth: Yaoundé, Cameroon
- Height: 1.88 m (6 ft 2 in)
- Position: Defender

Team information
- Current team: Wuhan Three Towns
- Number: 3

Youth career
- Lion Blessé

Senior career*
Years	Team	Apps	(Gls)
2019–2021	PWD Bamenda		
2021–2025	Radnički Niš	130	(3)
2026–	Wuhan Three Towns	13	(0)

International career^{‡}
2021	Cameroon	3	(0)
- * Club domestic league appearances and goals as of 22 November 2026 ‡ National team caps and goals as of 21 February 2022

Mbouri A Basile Yamkam (born 2 January 1998) is a Cameroonian professional footballer who plays as a defender for Chinese Super League club Wuhan Three Towns.

== Club career ==
He was part of the championship winning squad of PWD Bamenda in the 2019–20 Elite One season. By final days of August 2021 he signed a two-year contract with Serbian side Radnički Niš.

== International career ==
Yamkam has been playing since 2021 for the Cameroon national team.

== Career statistics ==
As of match played 29 November 2025

Appearances and goals by club, season and competition
Club	Season	League			Cup		Continental		Other		Total	
Club	Season	Division	Apps	Goals	Apps	Goals	Apps	Goals	Apps	Goals	Apps	Goals
PWD Bamenda	2019–20	Elite One			—		—		—		0	0
PWD Bamenda	2020–21	Elite One			0	0	2	0	—		2	0
PWD Bamenda	Total				0	0	2	0	—		2	0
Radnički Niš	2021–22	Serbian SuperLiga	15	0	1	0	—		—		16	0
Radnički Niš	2022–23	Serbian SuperLiga	33	0	3	0	—		2	0	38	0
Radnički Niš	2023–24	Serbian SuperLiga	33	0	2	0	—		—		35	0
Radnički Niš	2024–25	Serbian SuperLiga	33	3	2	0	—		2	0	37	3
Radnički Niš	2025–26	Serbian SuperLiga	16	0	0	0	—		—		16	0
Radnički Niš	Total		130	3	8	0	—		4	0	142	3
Wuhan Three Towns	2026	Chinese Super League	0	0	0	0	—		—		0	0
career total			130	3	8	0	2	0	4	0	144	3

== Honours ==
PWD Bamenda

- Elite One: 2019–20
