= Ibrahim Walidjo =

Cameroonian footballer

Personal information
- Full name: Ibrahim Walidjo Wassia
- Date of birth: 2 April 1989 (age 37)
- Place of birth: Yaoundé, Cameroon
- Height: 1.79 m (5 ft 10 in)
- Position: Defender

Senior career*
Years	Team	Apps	(Gls)
2004–2008	Dragon Club		
2009	APEJES Academy		
2010–2012	Renaissance Ngoumou		
2013–2015	Javor Ivanjica	36	(0)
2016	Panelefsiniakos	8	(0)
2016	AEZ Zakakiou	0	(0)
2017	Ialysos	7	(1)
2017–2018	ČSK Čelarevo	27	(1)
2018–2019	Liria Prizren	11	(0)
2019–2020	Bokelj	19	(0)

International career
2012	Cameroon	1	(0)
- * Club domestic league appearances and goals as of 1 July 2020

Ibrahim Walidjo Wassia (born 2 April 1989) is a Cameroonian former professional footballer who played as a defender.

== Club career ==
Walidjo played in Cameroon with Dragon Club, APEJES Academy and Renaissance FC de Ngoumou.

During the winter break of the 2012–13 season, he will move for first time to Europe, by joining FK Javor Ivanjica, a Serbian SuperLiga side.

He played with Greek clubs Panelefsiniakos and Ialysos. In summer 2018, he joined with Kosovo Superleague club Liria Prizren.

On 15 February 2019, Walidjo joined FK Bokelj.

== International career ==
Walidjo made a debut for the Cameroon national team in a friendly match against Angola in 2012.

Previously, he was part of Cameroon squad at the 2011 All-Africa Games.
