= Franck Nunke =

Cameroonian footballer

Personal information
- Full name: Franck Yannick Nunke
- Date of birth: 6 February 1997 (age 29)
- Place of birth: Yaoundé, Cameroon
- Height: 1.78 m (5 ft 10 in)
- Position: Midfielder

Senior career*
Years	Team	Apps	(Gls)
2016–2017	Tonnerre Yaoundé		
2017–2020	Dragon		
2021–2022	Dinamo Brest	8	(0)
- * Club domestic league appearances and goals as of 31 December 2021

Franck Nunke (born 6 February 1997) is a Cameroonian professional footballer.
