= Franck Etoundi =

Cameroonian footballer (born 1990)

Personal information
- Full name: Franck M'bia Etoundi
- Date of birth: 30 August 1990 (age 36)
- Place of birth: Douala, Cameroon
- Height: 1.84 m (6 ft 0 in)
- Position: Forward

Youth career
- 2004–2008: Dragons Yaoundé

Senior career*
Years	Team	Apps	(Gls)
2009	Ouragan FC	14	(3)
2009–2011	Neuchâtel Xamax	4	(1)
2010–2011	→ FC Bienne (loan)	26	(12)
2011–2013	St. Gallen	46	(12)
2013–2016	Zürich	74	(18)
2016–2018	Kasımpaşa	15	(1)
2018	Boluspor	8	(0)
2019	Sochaux	12	(1)
2019–2021	Slaven Belupo	26	(3)
2021–2022	AS Vitré	13	(5)
2022	UN Käerjéng 97	10	(2)

International career
2014–2015	Cameroon	11	(1)
- * Club domestic league appearances and goals as of 13:52, 15 February 2023 (UTC)

Franck M'bia Etoundi (born 30 August 1990) is a Cameroonian professional footballer who plays as a striker. At international level, he made eleven appearances for the Cameroon national team scoring once.

== Career ==
Born in Douala, Etoundi began his career 2004 with Dragons Yaoundé and joined 2009 to Ouragan FC de Biyem Assi.

In September 2009, Etoundi left his club Ouragan FC to sign his first professional contract in Europe for Neuchâtel Xamax, earning his first professional cap in the Swiss Super League on 14 February 2010 against FC Basel. On 27 April 2010, Neuchâtel Xamax confirmed his expiring contract would not renewed and he could leave the club.

On 17 May 2010, he began a trial with the Swiss club FC Biel-Bienne and signed a contract with the Swiss Challenge League team three days later.

In 2011–2012 Etoundi signed a new contract with FC St. Gallen until 2013 with an option for an additional year.

After 2 1/2 years in Turkey, he left Boluspor in December 2018 and signed a six-month contract in January 2019 with Sochaux in France.

Following the expiration of his contract with Sochaux, Etoundi was a free player, until he signed on 10 December 2019 with the Croatian side Slaven Belupo.

== Personal life ==
Franck is the younger brother of Stéphane Mbia.

== Career statistics ==
Scores and results list Cameroon's goal tally first.

#	Date	Venue	Opponent	Score	Result	Competition
1	7 January 2015	Stade Ahmadou Ahidjo, Yaounde, Cameroon	DR Congo	1–0	1–1	Friendly

== Honours ==
St. Gallen

- Swiss Challenge League: 2011–12

FC Zürich

- Swiss Cup: 2013–14
