= Botafogo FC =

Botafogo FC may refer to:

- Botafogo de Futebol e Regatas, Brazilian football club
- Botafogo Futebol Clube (SP), Brazilian football club
- Botafogo FC (Douala), Cameroonian football club
