= Stade Municipal de Bafoussam =

Multi-use stadium in Bafoussam, Cameroon

Stade Municipal de Bafoussam is a multi-use stadium in Bafoussam, Cameroon. It is currently used mostly for football matches and serves as a home ground of Université FC de Ngaoundéré of the Cameroon Première Division. The stadium holds 5,000 spectators.
