= Martin Ako Assomo =

Cameroonian footballer

Personal information
- Full name: Martin Loïc Ako Assomo
- Date of birth: 12 December 1999 (age 26)
- Place of birth: Ebolowa, Cameroon
- Position: Midfielder

Team information
- Current team: APEJES Academy

Senior career*
Years	Team	Apps	(Gls)
2016	Canon Yaoundé		
2016–2019	Eding Sport		
2019–2021	Fortuna Mfou		
2021	Riga		
2021	APEJES Academy		

International career
- Cameroon U20
2021–	Cameroon	9	(0)
- * Club domestic league appearances and goals as of 23 January 2022

Martin Loïc Ako Assomo (born 21 December 1999) is a Cameroonian professional footballer who plays as a winger for APEJES Academy and the Cameroon national football team.

== Club career ==
In March 2021, Assomo signed for Latvian club Riga. He moved back to AS Fortuna in June 2021. On 8 July 2021, he scored a brace against his former club Eding Sport, to grant Fortuna a 4–0 victory.

== International career ==
He debuted with the senior Cameroon national team in a goalless draw friendly match against Nigeria on 8 June 2021, coming on in the 81st minute for James Léa Siliki. He also made the final 33 man squad and competed for Cameroon during the 2020 African Nations Championship.
