= Akwo Tarh Ayuk Taku =

Cameroonian footballer (born 1992)

Akwo Ayuk
Personal information
- Full name: Akwo Tarh Ayuk Taku
- Date of birth: 7 December 1992 (age 33)
- Place of birth: Douala, Cameroon
- Position: Winger

Senior career*
Years	Team	Apps	(Gls)
2010	Les Astres		
2010–2011	Botafogo FC (Douala)		
2012–2013	Dunajská Streda	13	(1)
2013–2015	AFC Holnon Fayet		
2015	US Roye-Noyon	4	(0)
2016–2017	Union Douala		
2017	FC Renaissance du Congo		
2017–2018	AS Vita Club		
2019	Maidstone United	2	(0)
2019	Cheshunt	2	(0)
2020	Maidstone United	2	(1)
2021	Akhisarspor	13	(0)
2023–2024	Dulwich Hamlet	17	(2)

International career
2011	Cameroon	1	(0)
- * Club domestic league appearances and goals as of 21:36, 12 August 2024 (UTC)

Akwo Tarh Ayuk Taku (born 7 December 1992) is a Cameroonian footballer who plays as a midfielder.

== Career ==
Taku first arrived in Europe from Cameroon as a 14-year-old, joining an academy in Germany. He then returned to Cameroon to play for Les Astres and Botafogo FC (Douala). During this time he was called up by Cameroon for the 2011 African Nations Championship, where he was the youngest player in the squad.

He then moved to Slovakia, where he played in the Slovak Super Liga for Dunajská Streda in the 2011–12 season, and also the second tier the following season after their relegation. He then moved to France, playing for local league side AFC Holnon Fayet and for US Roye-Noyon in Championnat National 2. He then briefly returned to Cameroon with Union Douala before moving to the Democratic Republic of Congo, where he played for FC Renaissance du Congo and AS Vita Club.

In 2019 Taku moved to England where he joined National League South side Maidstone United in August 2019 after a successful trial in pre-season. Head of football John Still said "Ayuk came to us last year but we couldn't get his international clearance. It's only just come through now. He's been training with us - he's probably not 100% fit, certainly not match fit - but he's capable of magic things... He produces some unbelievable moments in training, he really does. We needed someone to come up with something and he has got that something. We need to get him properly fit as well but we thought we were that far away we might need a magic moment." He left the club in October to seek first-team football elsewhere after only two substitute appearances. He joined Isthmian League side Cheshunt the following month, where he made two appearances. In March 2020, he re-joined Maidstone after resolving a dispute with a former club. He scored on his return as a substitute against Welling United on 7 March 2020. He joined Akhisarspor in January 2021. In October 2023 he joined Dulwich Hamlet.
