= List of football stadiums in Cameroon =

Stadiums In Cameroon

The following is a list of football stadiums in Cameroon, with a capacity of at least 5,000 spectators. Some stadiums used for other purposes like athletics, concerts, politics and cultural events.

== Current stadiums ==
#	Images	Stadium	Capacity	City	Home team(s)
1		Paul Biya Stadium	60,000	Yaoundé	National team
2		Japoma Stadium	50,000	Douala	National team
3		Ahmadou Ahidjo Stadium	42,500	Yaoundé	Canon Yaoundé, Tonnerre Yaoundé, National team
4		Reunification Stadium	39,000	Douala	Union Douala, Caïman de Douala, Astres FC
5		Roumdé Adjia Stadium	30,000	Garoua	Cotonsport Garoua, Roumdé Adjia FC
6		Limbe Stadium	20,000	Limbé	Victoria United
7		Kouekong Stadium	20,000	Bafoussam	
8		Stade de Mbouda	5,000	Mbouda	Bamboutos FC
9		Municipal de Bamenda	5,000	Bamenda	PWD de Bamenda

== See also ==
- List of African stadiums by capacity
- List of stadiums by capacity
- Lists of stadiums
- Football in Cameroon
