= Football in Cameroon =

- Country: Cameroon
- Governing body: Cameroonian Football Federation
- National team: national football team

National competitions
- Africa Cup of Nations; FIFA World Cup

Club competitions
- League: Elite One; Elite Two; Region Leagues (10); Cups: Cameroonian Cup; Super Coupe Roger Milla

International competitions
- CAF Champions League; CAF Confederation Cup; CAF Super Cup; FIFA Club World Cup

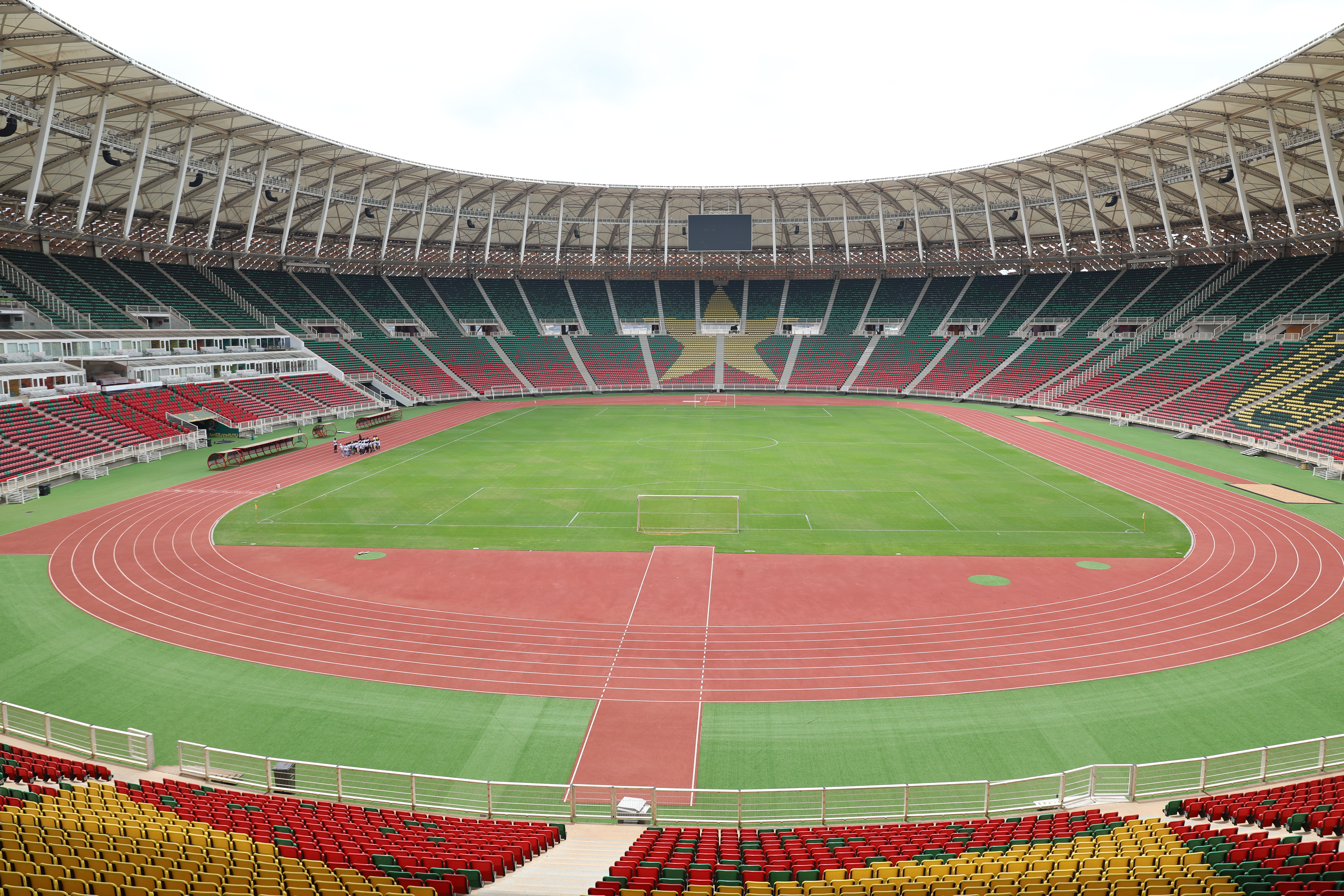
The Olembe Stadium is the largest sports venue by capacity in Cameroon.

The most popular sport in Cameroon is football. Approximately half of the people in Cameroon are interested in football.

The national team is traditionally one of the strongest teams on the African continent. They have participated in the FIFA World Cup eight times, and in 1990 they reached the quarter-finals. It took extra time before England won the game 3–2. They have also won the African Cup of Nations five times as well as winning Olympic gold in Sydney in 2000. Among the most famous players are Roger Milla, Thomas N'Kono and Samuel Eto'o.

== Competitions ==
=== National competitions ===
Cameroonian Football Federation, nicknamed Fécafoot, has been organizing the Cameroon Football Championship since 1961. The most titled Club is the Cotonsport Garoua, 12 times champion. The championship has been renamed "MTN Elite One" Since the 2007 season and sponsorship by the South African telephone operator MTN.

Level	League(s)/Division(s)
1	Elite One; 18 clubs
2	Elite Two; 15 clubs

=== Cup ===
The Cameroonian Cup was created in 1960. The Canon Yaoundé won it eleven times.

== National team ==
Cameroon national football team, dubbed "the Indomitable Lions", is one of the most successful in Africa, winning five times the African Cup of Nations (1984, 1988, 2000, 2002, 2017). in 1990, Cameroon became the first African country to reach the quarter-finals of the World Cup. In 2000, it won the Olympic Games.

== International competitions ==
Cameroon organized the African Cup of Nations (CAN) in 1972, Yaoundé and Douala. The competition was won by the Congo. At that time, the Congo was a single country.

It also hosted the CEMAC Cup in 1988 and 2008.

== Women's football ==
Cameroon women's national football team played its first game on 15 June 1991 in Nigeria (defeated 2–0) as Martin Spirit as Captain . Cameroon has been runners up in Africa Women Cup of Nations in 1991, 2004 and 2014. The national team competed for the first time at the 2012 Summer Olympics, and first qualified for the 2015 FIFA Women's World Cup.

== Attendances ==
The average attendance per top-flight football league season and the club with the highest average attendance:

Season	League average	Best club	Best club average
2019	828	Coton Sport	2,253

Source: League page on Wikipedia

== See also ==
- List of football stadiums in Cameroon
