= Stade Municipal Ndoumbe Oumar =

Stadium in Ngaoundéré, Cameroon

- Interactive map of Stade Municipal Ndoumbe Oumar
- Location: Ngaoundéré, Cameroon
- Capacity: 2,000

Tenant
- Université FC de Ngaoundéré

Stade Municipal Ndoumbe Oumar is a multi-use stadium in Ngaoundéré, Cameroon. It is currently used mostly for football matches, on club level by Université FC de Ngaoundéré of the Elite One. The stadium has a capacity of 2,000 spectators.
