= Football at the 2023 Jeux de la Francophonie =

2023 Football Tournament at the Jeux de la Francophonie.
Tournament details
- Host country: Democratic Republic of the Congo
- City: Kinshasa
- Dates: 28 July 2023 - 6 August 2023
- Teams: 9
- Venue: 2 (in 1 host city)

Final positions
- Champions: Cameroon (1st title)
- Runners-up: Burkina Faso
- Third place: Niger
- Fourth place: Benin

The football tournament at the 2023 Jeux de la Francophonie took place from 28 July to 6 August 2023 in Kinshasa, Democratic Republic of the Congo.

== Participants ==
- Benin
- Burkina Faso
- Ivory Coast
- Congo
- Cameroon
- DR Congo
- Lebanon
- Niger
- Senegal

== Group stage ==
=== Tiebreakers ===
The ranking of each team in each group was determined as follows:

1. Greatest number of points obtained in group matches
2. Greatest number of points obtained in head-to-head matches
3. Goal difference in all group matches
4. Greatest number of goals scored in all group matches

=== Group A ===
| Pos | Team | Pld | W | D | L | GF | GA | GD | Pts | Qualification |
|---|---|---|---|---|---|---|---|---|---|---|
| 1 | Benin | 2 | 2 | 0 | 0 | 5 | 0 | +5 | 6 | Advance to knockout stage |
| 2 | DR Congo (H) | 2 | 1 | 0 | 1 | 3 | 2 | +1 | 3 | |
| 3 | Mali | 2 | 0 | 0 | 2 | 0 | 6 | −6 | 0 | |

Source: Tournament Results
Rules for classification: Group stage tiebreakers
(H) Hosts
28 July 2023
10:00

| DR Congo | 0-2 | Benin |
|---|---|---|
| | | Chetchao Karo 58'; Vigninou 73' |

30 July 2023
18:00

| DR Congo | w/o | Mali |

1 August 2023
10:00

| Benin | w/o | Mali |

DR Congo and Benin were awarded 3-0 wins when Mali withdrew from their matches.

=== Group B ===
| Pos | Team | Pld | W | D | L | GF | GA | GD | Pts | Qualification |
|---|---|---|---|---|---|---|---|---|---|---|
| 1 | Burkina Faso | 2 | 2 | 0 | 0 | 2 | 0 | +2 | 6 | Advance to knockout stage |
| 2 | Congo | 2 | 0 | 1 | 1 | 2 | 3 | −1 | 1 | |
| 3 | Senegal | 2 | 0 | 1 | 1 | 2 | 3 | −1 | 1 | |

Source: Tournament Results
Rules for classification: Group stage tiebreakers
29 July 2023
15:00

| Senegal | 2-2 | Congo |
|---|---|---|
| Niang 15'; Diong 71' | | Soussou 13'; Soussou 27' |

31 July 2023
15:00

| Senegal | 0-1 | Burkina Faso |
|---|---|---|
| | | Ouattara 14' |

8 August 2023
18:00

| Burkina Faso | 1-0 | Congo |
|---|---|---|
| | | Seone 69' |

=== Group C ===
| Pos | Team | Pld | W | D | L | GF | GA | GD | Pts | Qualification |
|---|---|---|---|---|---|---|---|---|---|---|
| 1 | Cameroon | 2 | 1 | 1 | 0 | 2 | 1 | +1 | 4 | Advance to knockout stage |
| 2 | Niger | 2 | 1 | 0 | 1 | 5 | 1 | +4 | 3 | Advance to knockout stage |
| 3 | Lebanon | 2 | 0 | 1 | 1 | 1 | 6 | −5 | 1 | |

Source: Tournament Results
Rules for classification: Group stage tiebreakers
29 July 2023
18:00

| Cameroon | 1-1 | Lebanon |
|---|---|---|
| Nebamkia 45+3' | | Kassas 66' |

31 July 2023
18:00

| Cameroon | 1-0 | Niger |
|---|---|---|
| Motapon 54' |

2 August 2023
15:00

| Lebanon | 0-5 | Niger |
|---|---|---|
| | | Ayouba 45+3' pen Latif 49' pen Abdoulaye 73'; Latif 90'; Rachid 90+3' |

== Knockout stage ==
=== Seventh place playoff ===
3 August 2023
15:00

| Senegal | 3-0 | Lebanon |
|---|---|---|
| Diong 9'; Diop 28'; Diop 38' |

=== Fifth place playoff ===
3 August 2023
18:00

| DR Congo | 1-0 | Congo |
|---|---|---|
| Mbede 2' |

=== Semi-finals ===
4 August 2023
16:00

| Benin | 1-1 | Burkina Faso |
|---|---|---|
| Attiddjikou 35' | | Seone 21' pen |
Penalties
| Roufai; Abdoulaye; Ibrahim; Sankamao; Malik | 5-6 | Chardey; Dao; Ouattara; Seone; Barro; Toumagnou |

4 August 2023
18:00

| Cameroon | 1-0 | Niger |
|---|---|---|
| Avom Ebong 67' |

=== Third place playoff ===
5 August 2023
18:00

| Benin | 1-1 | Niger |
|---|---|---|
| Issifou 7' | | Ayouba 83' |
Penalties
| Roufai; Abdolaye; Sankamao | 3-4 | Ibrahim Litinine; Abdoulaye Mahaman; Latif; Pape Moctar M'Baye |

=== Final ===
6 August 2023
17:00

| Burkina Faso | 1-2 | Cameroon |
|---|---|---|
| Dicko 63' | | Nebamkia 25'; Avom Ebong 81' |

== Medallists ==
| Event | Gold | Silver | Bronze |
|---|---|---|---|
| Men's Football | Cameroon; Samuel Dilan Yede; Teufack Casimis Fokou; Junior Maxente Ella; Franck Atsama; Ibrahim Halilou Mouhaman; Brice Romuald Eboudje; Jordy Ndoumbe Youmba; John Eric Moursou; Nsohasaah Salomon; Arthur Avom Ebong; Camille Dimitri Manyim; Sauveur Mbaibe Komhidi; Bil Dornol Nsongo Tonfack; Wilfried Parfait Teukeu Tekoudjou; Hamed Fadil Motapon; Gaspard Franck Messobo Ambassa; Franklin Lincoln Banmassa Kamleu; Joel Paten; Noh Nafeng Yvan; Peter Paul Nebamkia | Burkina Faso; Philippe La Paix Mare; Nagoro Brahima Dao; Libo Ismael Seone; Eric Chardey; Cyrille Dao; Tertius Bagre; Harouna Braima Dicko; San Ulrich Cedric Barro; Salif Tietietta; Aziz Siribie; Abdoul Kader Ouattara; Yacouba Cheick Toumagnou; Rodrigue Kere; Zakaria Tinta; Tidiane Bagaya; Ladje Brahima Sanou; Hasmadou Ouedraogo; Memel Dao Raouf; Yacouba Konate; Alane Moussa Ky | Niger; Souleymane Boubacar Yacouba; Abdoul Latif Djibril Goumey Diori; Mohamed Pape Moctar M'Baye; Ousmane Djibo Garba; Abdoul Rachid Sama Moussa; Mahamadou Ayouba Tidjani; Abdoulaye Ibrahim Litinine; Ousmane Abdoulaye Mahaman; Souleymane Daouda Shina; Massoudi Salifou; Hainiroye Younoussa; Ridouane Boubacar; Moutari Harouna Cheffou; Abdoul Razak Mounkaila Harouna; Abiboulaye Younoussa; Alhabib Hassane Abdou; Mohamed Harouna Moussa |
