= 2023 Jeux de la Francophonie =

International sports competition in Kinshasa, DRC

IX Jeux de la Francophonie
- Host city: Kinshasa, Democratic Republic of the Congo
- Nations: 34
- Athletes: 3,000
- Opening: 28 July 2023
- Closing: 6 August 2023
- Opened by: Félix Tshisekedi
- Main venue: Stade des Martyrs de la Pentecôte
- Website: https://kinshasa2023.org/

The 2023 Jeux de la Francophonie (Lingala: 2023 Masano ya Francophonie), also known as IXes Jeux de la Francophonie (French for 9th Francophone Games), informally Kinshasa 2023 (Lingala: Kinsásá 2023), were a multi-sport event held from July 28 to August 6, 2023, in Kinshasa, Democratic Republic of the Congo. This was the first edition of the games to be hosted in the Democratic Republic of the Congo.

Originally awarded on April 7, 2016, to Moncton and Dieppe. On January 30, 2019, the New Brunswick government cancelled its commitment to host the games due to funding issues. The games were awarded to Kinshasa, Democratic Republic of the Congo in July 2019.

In 2020, the games were moved from 2021 to 2022 to avoid clashing with the delayed 2020 Summer Olympics. They were postponed once again in 2022, to 2023 due to delays.

Several countries withdrew from the games or sent reduced delegations due to health and safety concerns including team Canada, Quebec, New Brunswick and France.

== Organisation ==
=== First selection ===
Among the interested hosts were Moncton-Dieppe, New Brunswick, Sherbrooke, Quebec and the french island of Guadeloupe. After the advisory committee of the international committee of the Francophonie Games decided to support New Brunswick, the Quebec government announced that it was joining the consensus reached, would step aside and support New Brunswick's bid. The games were officially awarded in Paris on April 7, 2016, to Moncton and Dieppe as the sole remaining bid.

Venues for the games were to include Universite de Moncton's Moncton Stadium, and facilities at Mount Allison University and Crandall University. New Brunswick Community College in Dieppe was expected to host the event's cultural activities. Up to 4,000 athletes and artists were expected to participate.

Initially expected to cost $17.5 million, costs grew by 664 per cent to $130 million. On January 30, 2019, the New Brunswick government cancelled its commitment to host the games due to funding issues.

=== Second selection ===
The city council of Sherbrooke, Quebec passed a motion in February 2019 expressing support for hosting the game provided the city receive financial support from the federal government of Canada and the provincial government of Quebec.

The Organisation internationale de la Francophonie issued a new call on 1 March 2019 for bids to host the games with a deadline of 31 May 2019 for submissions. The games were awarded to Kinshasa, Democratic Republic of the Congo in July 2019.

== Controversies ==
Less than a month before the Games, several teams withdrew due to health and safety concerns. Quebec canceled its participation, while Canada and New Brunswick participated with reduced delegations. France limited itself to a few events, refusing, among other things, to send participants for athletics and cycling events. Wallonia-Brussels only sent participants for cultural events, expressing concerns about the state of sports infrastructure. Some delegations, including the Canadian one, hired additional security teams.

The general secretary of the Organisation internationale de la Francophonie, Louise Mushikiwabo, did not attend the opening ceremony of the games. Against a backdrop of diplomatic tensions between Rwanda and the DRC, she claims that her invitation was never sent to her. She was replaced by Caroline St-Hilaire, administrator of the OIF.

In October 2023 Nicolas Kazadi, the Congolese Minister of Finance, estimated that the cost of the games was ultimately multiplied by seven. According to figures published by the minister, the initial budget of $48 million ultimately reached $324 million.

== Participants ==
Of the 93 member countries and governments of the Francophonie, 34 sent their delegations.

Participating members
- Armenia
- Benin
- Burkina Faso
- Burundi
- Cameroon
- Canada
- Canada New Brunswick
- Central African Republic
- Chad
- Democratic Republic of the Congo (host)
- Republic of Congo
- Djibouti
- Equatorial Guinea
- France
- Gabon
- Guinea
- Ivory Coast
- Kosovo
- Lebanon
- Madagascar
- Mali
- Mauritius
- Morocco
- Niger
- Romania
- Senegal
- Seychelles
- St. Lucia
- Switzerland
- Togo
- Tunisia
- United Arab Emirates
- Vietnam
- Wallonia-Brussels

== Venues ==
=== Sport Venues ===
Venue	Sports
Stade des Martyrs - Terrain annexe	Athletics, Para-athletics
Stade des Martyrs - Gymnasium	Basketball
Stade des Martyrs	Football (Final and Semi-finals)
Stade de Barumbu	Football (Group stage)
Stade Tata Raphaël	Football (Group stage)
Stade Tata Raphaël - Gymnasium	Judo, Wrestling (Freestyle)
Stade Tata Raphaël - Salle de Tennis de Table	Table tennis
Esplanade Fikin	Wrestling (African)

=== Cultural Venues ===
Venue	Event
National Museum of the Democratic Republic of the Congo	Painting, Photography, Sculpture
Echangeur de Limete	Hip-hop dance, Juggling, Puppetry
Palais du Peuple	Song
Centre Wallonie-Bruxelles	Storytelling
Institut Français - Halle de la Gombe	Digital creation
Délégation Wallonie-Bruxelles	Literature

== Events ==
=== Sports ===
- Athletics
- Basketball
- Cycling (road)
- Football (soccer)
- Para-athletics
- Judo
- Table tennis
- Wrestling (African and freestyle)

=== Cultural ===
- Creative dance
- Digital creation
- Hip-hop dance
- Juggling
- Literature
- Poetry
- Painting
- Photography
- Puppetry
- Sculpture
- Song
- Storytelling
- Traditional inspiration dance

== Medal table ==
Final medal tally below.

* Host nation (DR Congo)

Rank	Nation	Gold	Silver	Bronze	Total
1	Morocco	23	16	19	58
2	Romania	17	9	12	38
3	Cameroon	13	13	14	40
4	Senegal	10	9	6	25
5	Burkina Faso	7	4	8	19
6	France	7	4	4	15
7	Ivory Coast	6	5	4	15
8	Mauritius	6	4	2	12
9	DR Congo*	5	11	19	35
10	Canada	4	6	3	13
11	Djibouti	4	1	3	8
12	Niger	3	8	7	18
13	Madagascar	3	4	2	9
14	Armenia	3	2	3	8
15	Lebanon	2	1	5	8
16	Chad	1	5	4	10
17	Tunisia	1	3	2	6
18	Kosovo	1	2	1	4
19	Switzerland	1	1	3	5
20	Guinea	1	1	0	2
21	Benin	1	0	2	3
22	Congo	0	4	7	11
23	Togo	0	2	1	3
24	Gabon	0	1	4	5
25	Burundi	0	1	2	3
25	Mali	0	1	2	3
27	(Wallonia) French Community of Belgium	0	1	1	2
28	New Brunswick	0	0	2	2
29	Equatorial Guinea	0	0	1	1
29	Vietnam	0	0	1	1
Totals (30 entries)		119	119	144	382

== Medalists ==
=== African wrestling ===
Event	Gold	Silver	Bronze
Men's team	Senegal; Babacar Diène; Mamadou Diouf; Modou Faye; Gora Niang; Siny Sembène	Niger; Djamilou Bakoye Bajini; Noura Hassane Salou; Aboubacar Ibrahim Mahaman; Mansour Issa Saley; Zakirou Zakari Abdourahamane	Burkina Faso; Iyassa Bado; Karim Basongo; Koni Diallo; Siaka Konate; Kevin Mosse
Men's 66 kg	Djamilou Bakoye Bajini; Niger	Iyassa Bado; Burkina Faso	Babacar Diène; Senegal
Men's 76 kg	Mamadou Diouf; Senegal	Mansour Issa Saley; Niger	Koni Diallo; Burkina Faso
Men's 86 kg	Aboubacar Ibrahim Mahaman; Niger	Pierrot Mayakapongo Kabuanga; DR Congo	Siny Sembène; Senegal
Men's 100 kg	Gora Niang; Senegal	Alaza Sayibia; Togo	Noura Hassane Salou; Niger
Men's +100 kg	Modou Faye; Senegal	Idriss Bousseina; Chad	Zakirou Zakari Abdourahamane; Niger
Women's team	Cameroon; Rose Namondo Kombe; Natacha Nabaina; Blodine Nyeh Ngui; Rosine Ntsa Assouga; Pélagiie Wilita	Chad; Bamdra Eldjoumba Bamaye; Godah Samsia Gassida; Lubahitar Josta; Issa Zara	DR Congo; Djenny Boenga Eyale; Ndombe Kiengi; Prisca Madunu; Mira Mbala; Rosie Tabora
Women's 48 kg	N'De Caroline Yapi; Ivory Coast	Rosine Ntsa Assouga; Cameroon	Lubahitar Josta; Chad
Women's 53 kg	Rose Namondo Kombe; Cameroon	Beatrice Ionela Ferent; Romania	Mama Marie Sambou; Senegal
Women's 58 kg	Zineb Hassoune; Morocco	Mariatou Diallo; Senegal	Wendgounda Josiane Nabi; Burkina Faso
Women's 63 kg	Blodine Nyeh Ngui; Cameroon	Fatoumata Yarie Camara; Guinea	Malala Soloniaina; Madagascar
Women's 70 kg	Amy Youin; Ivory Coast	Pélagiie Wilita; Cameroon	Adina Ionela Irimia; Romania

=== Basketball ===
Event	Gold	Silver	Bronze
Women	Senegal; Aminata Tall; Seynabou Ndoye; Seynabou Dieye; Mame Coumba Fall; Coumba Niang; Julie Dacosta; Aminata Ly; Khadija Faye; Ndioma Kane; Aissatou Mame Fall; Khadidiatou Bigue Sarr; Laurence Sabine Diedhiou	Cameroon; Michelle Noelle Nkolo; Alie'A Vafon Joko; Sema Ekah; Paule Nkwetchou Njoukwe; Salomé Bella Belong; Loica Djuessie Youta; Myriam Guiolobo; Josiane Feumba; Damaris Phalonne Emedie; Audrey Batchaya Djofang; Josiane Tcheumeleu Tientcheu	Madagascar; Harisoa Hajanirina; Nahitantsoa Rakotobe; Marion Rasolofoson; Elinah Ranarisaona; Setratiana Manohisoa; Avotra Marson; Minaoharisoa Jaofera; Malala Rasendrarison; Harimihanta Andriatahina; Jessica Vavisoa; Angelissa Velontiana; Lalaina Rasoanomenjanahary

=== Cultural ===
Event	Gold	Silver	Bronze
Creative dance	Cie Fientan; Burkina Faso	Cie Les Algues; DR Congo	Cie Siwa Carmelita; Benin
Digital creation	VieAir 2.26; Burkina Faso	Paul Malaba; DR Congo	Bj Vision; Gabon
Hip-hop dance	Team Léopard; DR Congo	Power Crew Bboying; Senegal	One Nation; Wallonia
Juggling	Stylers Crew; Morocco	CIV freestyle team Ivory Coast	FECOFREE; DR Congo
Literature	Jocelyn Danga Motty; DR Congo	Cécile Hupin; Wallonia	Valentin Decoppet; Switzerland
Painting	Richianny Raherinjatovo; Madagascar	Fally Sène Sow; Senegal	Glodi Mbela Mambueni; DR Congo
Photography	Mary Madanamootoo; Mauritius	Ralff Lhyliann; Congo	Adrien Tache; France
Puppetry	Les Marionnettes du Congo; DR Congo	KAdam-KAdam; Togo	Collectif Sannu-Sannu; Niger
Sculpture	Senou Anthelme Lokossou; Benin	Fitiavana Ratovo Andriantseheno; Madagascar	Kwami Dodji Agbetoglo; Togo
Song	Nda Chi; Cameroon	Flora Paré; Burkina Faso	Lerie Sankofa; Ivory Coast
Storytelling	Hanna Samira Moumoula; Burkina Faso	Mamane Iro Salifou; Niger	Dan Bosembo Alonga; DR Congo

=== Cycling ===
Event	Gold	Silver	Bronze
Men's road race	Achraf Ed Doghmy; Morocco	Nasr-Eddine Maatougui; Morocco	Cătălin Buta; Romania
Women's road race	Salma Hariri; Morocco	Chaimae Ez-Zakraoui; Morocco	Wissal Baoubbou; Morocco

=== Judo ===
Event	Gold	Silver	Bronze
Men's 60 kg	Ashik Andreyan; Armenia	Alexandru Matei; Romania	Enzo Jean; France
Men's 60 kg	Ashik Andreyan; Armenia	Alexandru Matei; Romania	Arnold Kisoka; DR Congo
Men's 66 kg	Julien Frascadore; Canada	Fernand Nkero; Gabon	Joe Haddad; Lebanon
Men's 66 kg	Julien Frascadore; Canada	Fernand Nkero; Gabon	Lucian Borş-Dumitrescu; Romania
Men's 73 kg	Hassan Doukkali; Morocco	Gedéon Kasota; DR Congo	Dardan Cena; Kosovo
Men's 73 kg	Hassan Doukkali; Morocco	Gedéon Kasota; DR Congo	Alexandre Rubiano; France
Men's 81 kg	David Popovici; Canada	Tizie Gnamien; France	Hamza Kabdani; Morocco
Men's 81 kg	David Popovici; Canada	Tizie Gnamien; France	Kissouli Khaled Axel Konate; Burkina Faso
Men's 90 kg	Alexandru Sibișan; Romania	Alexandre Arencibia; Canada	Thierry Lusamba; DR Congo
Men's 90 kg	Alexandru Sibișan; Romania	Alexandre Arencibia; Canada	Vladimir Ngueya Naheu; Cameroon
Men's 100 kg	Shpati Zekaj; Kosovo	Eduard Serban; Romania	Walid Boukhriss; Morocco
Men's 100 kg	Shpati Zekaj; Kosovo	Eduard Serban; Romania	Libasse Ndiaye; Senegal
Men's +100 kg	Khamzat Saparbaev; France	John Jr. Messé A Bessong; Canada	Mohammed Lahboub; Morocco
Women's 48 kg	Anais Perrot; France	Signoline Kanyamuneza; Burundi	Aziza Chakir; Morocco
Women's 48 kg	Anais Perrot; France	Signoline Kanyamuneza; Burundi	Charlize Isabelle Medilo; Canada
Women's 52 kg	Marie Céline Baba Matia; Cameroon	Florina Bădiceanu; Romania	Fatime Barka Segue; Chad
Women's 52 kg	Marie Céline Baba Matia; Cameroon	Florina Bădiceanu; Romania	Evelyn Beaton; Canada
Women's 57 kg	Chloé Devictor; France	Narindra Rakotovao; Madagascar	Zalika Hassane Abdou; Niger
Women's 57 kg	Chloé Devictor; France	Narindra Rakotovao; Madagascar	Wissal Ziane; Morocco
Women's 63 kg	Rania Drid; France	Isabelle Harris; Canada	Chaimae Taibi; Morocco
Women's 63 kg	Rania Drid; France	Isabelle Harris; Canada	Aqulina Chayeb; Lebanon
Women's 70 kg	Aina Laura Rasoanaivo Razafy; Madagascar	Laurence Biron; Canada	Oulaya Khairi; Morocco
Women's 70 kg	Aina Laura Rasoanaivo Razafy; Madagascar	Laurence Biron; Canada	Zita Ornella Biami; Cameroon
Women's 78 kg	Liz Ngelebeya; France	Coralie Godbout; Canada	Georgika Wesly Djengue Moune; Cameroon
Women's +78 kg	Tracy Durhone; Mauritius	Emilie Daika Afang Obiang; Gabon	Marie Claude Polneau; Ivory Coast
Mixed team	Team Mbuji-Mayi; Marie Baba Matia (CMR); Cheick Bamogo (BUR); Rosine Bodjrenou (BEN); Ioan Dzitac (ROU); Tizie Gnamien (FRA); Lizzie Joseph (MRI); Hafsa Yatim (MAR)	Team Paris; Robert Beina Bangmo (CMR); Kadodjobe Cissé (CIV); Sasso Hassan Mohamed (DJI); Inès Irakiza (BDI); Isabelle Landu Malundama (COD); Khamzat Saparbaev (FRA); Wissal Ziane (MAR)	Team Bukavu; Marie Alexsha Agathe (MRI); Chloé Devictor (FRA); Alberto Kems Bokandji (COD); Hillary Komba Ngwamidiba (GAB); Kissouli Konate (BUR); David Koung A Koung (CMR); Rianah Ramahefarison Harind (MAD)
Mixed team	Team Mbuji-Mayi; Marie Baba Matia (CMR); Cheick Bamogo (BUR); Rosine Bodjrenou (BEN); Ioan Dzitac (ROU); Tizie Gnamien (FRA); Lizzie Joseph (MRI); Hafsa Yatim (MAR)	Team Paris; Robert Beina Bangmo (CMR); Kadodjobe Cissé (CIV); Sasso Hassan Mohamed (DJI); Inès Irakiza (BDI); Isabelle Landu Malundama (COD); Khamzat Saparbaev (FRA); Wissal Ziane (MAR)	Team Beyrouth; Anna Siga Faye (SEN); Winsley Gangaya (MRI); Gedéon Kasota Kisiati (COD); Ada Mounguengui (GAB); Ange Niragira (BDI); Fetra Ranaivoarisoa (MAD); Souleymane Seogo (BUR)

=== Table tennis ===
Event	Gold	Silver	Bronze
Men's singles	Andrei Eduard Ionescu; Romania	Fabio Rakotoarimanana; Madagascar	Ylane Batix; Cameroon
Men's singles	Andrei Eduard Ionescu; Romania	Fabio Rakotoarimanana; Madagascar	Exaucé Ngefuassa Ngyie; DR Congo
Women's singles	Elena Adriana Zaharia; Romania	Fadwa Garci; Tunisia	Mariam El Habech; Lebanon
Women's singles	Elena Adriana Zaharia; Romania	Fadwa Garci; Tunisia	Rima Khlghatyan; Armenia
Mixed doubles	Romania; Andrei Eduard Ionescu; Elena Adriana Zaharia	Mauritius; Ryan Desscann; Sandhana Desscann	Cameroon; Ylane Batix; Juliana Mbock
Mixed doubles	Romania; Andrei Eduard Ionescu; Elena Adriana Zaharia	Mauritius; Ryan Desscann; Sandhana Desscann	Tunisia; Youssef Ben Attia; Fadwa Garci
Mixed team	Romania; Andrei Eduard Ionescu; Elena Adriana Zaharia	Tunisia; Youssef Ben Attia; Fadwa Garci	Gabon; Andy Bringaud; Louidiglisia Maloufa Minzie
Mixed team	Romania; Andrei Eduard Ionescu; Elena Adriana Zaharia	Tunisia; Youssef Ben Attia; Fadwa Garci	Lebanon; Saadeddine El Habach; Mariam El Habech

=== Wrestling ===
Event	Gold	Silver	Bronze
Men's freestyle 57 kg	Răzvan Marian Kovacs; Romania	Omar Faye; Senegal	Roland Tambi Nforsong; Cameroon
Men's freestyle 57 kg	Răzvan Marian Kovacs; Romania	Omar Faye; Senegal	Arakel Movsesyan; Armenia
Men's freestyle 61 kg	Vrezh Gevorgyan; Armenia	Rabby Kilonga Kilandi; DR Congo	Samuel Dohya Kale; Cameroon
Men's freestyle 65 kg	Marwane Ahmed Yezza; France	Hrachya Margaryan; Armenia	Raby Bapelekia; Congo
Men's freestyle 65 kg	Marwane Ahmed Yezza; France	Hrachya Margaryan; Armenia	Stefan Ionut Coman; Romania
Men's freestyle 70 kg	Gevorg Mkheyan; Armenia	Moukhammad Amin Sangariev; France	Kaireddine Ben Telili; Tunisia
Men's freestyle 70 kg	Gevorg Mkheyan; Armenia	Moukhammad Amin Sangariev; France	Jacques Monty Mbougou; Cameroon
Men's freestyle 74 kg	Maxim Vasilioglo; Romania	Aime Rakotoniaina; Madagascar	Mamadou Diouf; Senegal
Men's freestyle 74 kg	Maxim Vasilioglo; Romania	Aime Rakotoniaina; Madagascar	Guy Alain Lago; Ivory Coast
Men's freestyle 79 kg	Andy Kabeya Mukendi; DR Congo	Razmik Simonyan; Armenia	Jean Claude Atongui; Congo
Men's freestyle 79 kg	Andy Kabeya Mukendi; DR Congo	Razmik Simonyan; Armenia	Abou Nafou Zorome; Burkina Faso
Men's freestyle 86 kg	Siny Sembène; Senegal	Aboubacar Ibrahim Mahaman; Niger	Barthelemy Tshosha; DR Congo
Men's freestyle 92 kg	Cédric Abossolo; Cameroon	Mihai Nicolae Palaghia; Romania	Tommy Thomas Mabruki; DR Congo
Men's freestyle 97 kg	Aron Isomi Mbo; DR Congo	Askerkhan Khounkaev; France	Aiden Kenneth Stevenson; Canada
Men's freestyle 125 kg	Modou Faye; Senegal	Reagan Mabuba; DR Congo	Gires Tebou; Cameroon
Women's freestyle 50 kg	Emma Luttenauer; France	N'De Caroline Yapi; Ivory Coast	Ana Maria Pîrvu; Romania
Women's freestyle 50 kg	Emma Luttenauer; France	N'De Caroline Yapi; Ivory Coast	Chancelvie Gomba; DR Congo
Women's freestyle 53 kg	Beatrice Ionela Ferent; Romania	Lilya Cohen; France	Mama Marie Sambou; Senegal
Women's freestyle 53 kg	Beatrice Ionela Ferent; Romania	Lilya Cohen; France	Nguyễn Thị Oanh; Vietnam
Women's freestyle 55 kg	Miriam Drock Ngoe Wase; Cameroon	Makiese Prisca Madunu; DR Congo	not awarded
Women's freestyle 57 kg	Zineb Hassoune; Morocco	Faten Hammami; Tunisia	Natacha Nabaina; Cameroon
Women's freestyle 59 kg	Siwar Bouseta; Tunisia	Kateryna Zhydachevska; Romania	Amel Rebiha; France
Women's freestyle 62 kg	Aleah Noelle Nickel; Canada	Diwa Mervedie Mbemba; DR Congo	Salmantou Coulibaly; Burkina Faso
Women's freestyle 65 kg	Amina Roxana Capezan; Romania	Blandine Nyeh Ngiri; Cameroon	Vivian Mei Kutnowski; New Brunswick
Women's freestyle 68 kg	Katie Nichole Mulkay; Canada	Berthe Etane Ngolle; Cameroon	Adina Ionela Irimia; Romania
Women's freestyle 72 kg	Maria Larisa Niţu; Romania	Nyla Raeleen Burgess; Canada	Elena Sehic; New Brunswick
Women's freestyle 72 kg	Maria Larisa Niţu; Romania	Nyla Raeleen Burgess; Canada	Danielle Sino Guemde; Cameroon
Women's freestyle 76 kg	Cătălina Axente; Romania	Amy Youin; Ivory Coast	Erica Déborah Ngakali; Congo
