= Djiko FC de Bandjoun =

Football club in Cameroon

Djiko Football Club de Bandjoun also known as Feutcheu FC is a Cameroonian football club based in Bandjoun. The club competes in the Cameroon Premiere Division. The club's colours are red and white.

== History ==
It was founded in 2011. The club board decided to change the club name to Feutcheu FC, after the takeover of new owner Feutcheu Joseph in 2020. The club plays its home matches at the Kouekong Stadium in Bafoussam.
