= Stade Municipal (Maroua) =

Stadium in Maroua, Cameroon

Coordinates: 10°35′25″N 14°19′37″E

Stade Municipal, also known as the Lamido Yaya Dairou Stadium, is a multi-use stadium in Maroua, Cameroon. It is currently used for football matches and has also hosted university graduations and political events such as election rallies.

The stadium equally serves as a hippodrome hosting both local and international horseracing competitions. It serves as a home ground of Sahel FC. The stadium holds 5,000 people.
