= Stade de Batié =

Sports venue in Batié, Cameroon

Stade de Batié is a multi-use stadium in Batié, Cameroon. It is used mostly for football matches. It is a home ground of Sable FC. The stadium holds 5,000 people.
