= Scorpion de Bey =

- Ground: Roumdé Adjia Stadium, Garoua, Cameroon
- Capacity: 20,000
- League: Elite One

Scorpion de Bey is a Cameroonian football club. They are a member of the Cameroonian Football Federation and Elite One, the topflight football league of Cameroon.

== Stadium ==
Currently the team plays at the 20,000 capacity Roumdé Adjia Stadium.
