= Molyko Omnisport Stadium =

Stadium in Buéa, Cameroon

- Interactive map of Molyko Omnisport Stadium
- Location: Cameroon
- Coordinates: 4°09′41″N 9°16′46″E
- Capacity: 3200

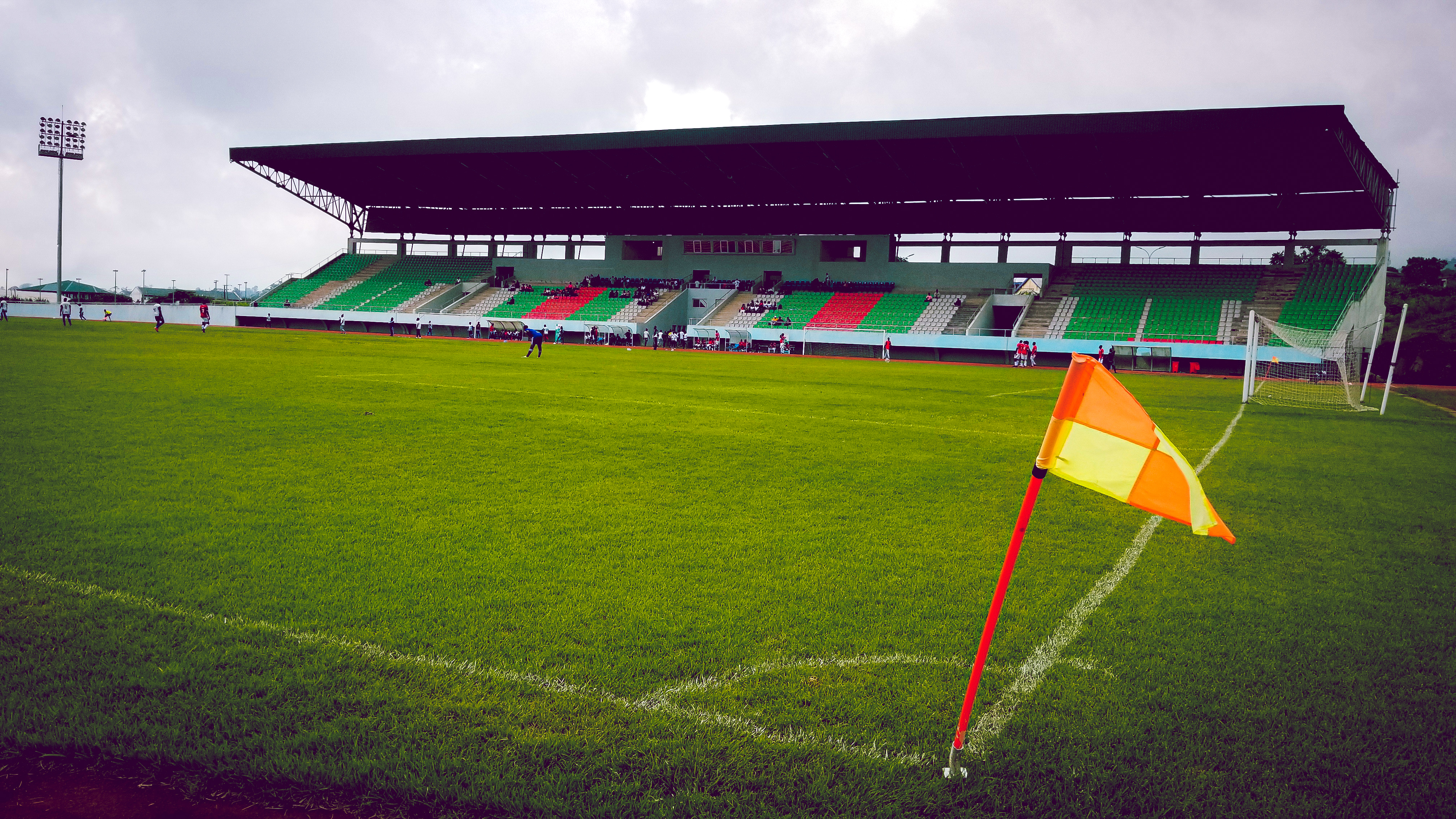
Molyko Stadium

Molyko Omnisport Stadium is a multi-use stadium in Buea, Cameroon. It is currently used mostly for football matches. It serves as a home ground of Mount Cameroon FC. The stadium has 3,200 seats but can hold 15,000 people. The stadium is situated at the Molyko quarters in Buea and the turf is made of natural grass.
