= Loum, Cameroon =

Loum
- Location in Cameroon
- Coordinates: 4°43′4″N 9°43′48″E
- Country: Cameroon
- Province: Littoral Province
- Elevation: 293 m (961 ft)

Population (2011)
  - Total: 177,429

Loum is a city located in the Littoral Region of Cameroon. It is home to UMS de Loum.

== See also ==
- Communes of Cameroon
