= Douala Athletic Club =

Association football club in Cameroon

Douala AC
- Full name: Douala Athletic Club 2000
- Nickname(s): DAC 2000
- Founded: 2000; 25 years ago
- Ground: Stade de la Réunification; Douala, Cameroon
- Capacity: 30,000
- Chairman: Ngalle Esaie
- Manager: Darko Milokic league = Elite One
- 2013–14: Elite Two, 1st
Home colours	Away colours

Douala Athletic Club 2000 is a football club in Cameroon.

== History ==
Douala Athletic Club was founded in the year 2000. In 2002, the club was promoted to the Province du Littoral, the then-second tier of football in Cameroon. DAC played eleven times in that league, before in 2013 winning MTN Elite Two and promoted to Elite One, the top tier.

== Stadium ==
They play at 30,000 capacity Stade de la Réunification in Douala.
