= AS Lausanne de Yaoundé =

- Ground: Stade Ahmadou Ahidjo; Yaoundé, Cameroon
- Capacity: 35,000
- League: Elite One
- 2009–10: Elite Two, 1st
Home colours	Away colours

AS Lausanne de Yaoundé is a Cameroonian football club based in Yaoundé. They currently play their home games within the Stade Ahmadou Ahidjo, a stadium they share with fellow Elite One club Canon Yaoundé. As of the 2010–11 season, they currently play in the MTN Elite One, having been promoted from the MTN Elite Two after topping the league in the 2009–10 season.

== Honours ==
=== Domestic ===
- Elite Two: (1)
  - Winners: 2009–10
