= Lion Blessé =

- Full name: Lion Blessé de Fotouni
- League: Elite two

Lion Blessé de Fotouni is a Cameroonian football club based in the city of Fotouni. They are a member of the Cameroonian Football Federation and currently play in the top domestic league Elite Two.
