= AS Matelots =

Association Sportive Matelots
- Full name: Associacion Sportif Matelots
- Nickname: The Shipyard Workers
- Short name: AS Matelots
- Ground: Stade de la Réunification; Douala, Cameroon
- Capacity: 39,000
- League: MTN Elite two
- 2013–14: 7
Home colours

Association Sportive Matelots is a Cameroonian football club based in Bafoussam. It is a member of the Fédération Camerounaise de Football. They currently compete in MTN Elite Ligue 2, which is level 2 in the Cameroon football pyramid.
