= Stade Municipal de Bangangté =

Sports venue in Bangangté, Cameroon

Coordinates: 5°08′31″N 10°32′05″E

- Interactive map of Stade Municipal de Bangangté
- Full name: Stade Municipal de Bangangté
- Location: Bangangté, Cameroon
- Capacity: 2,000 (Expandable to 10,000)

Tenant
- Panthère du Ndé

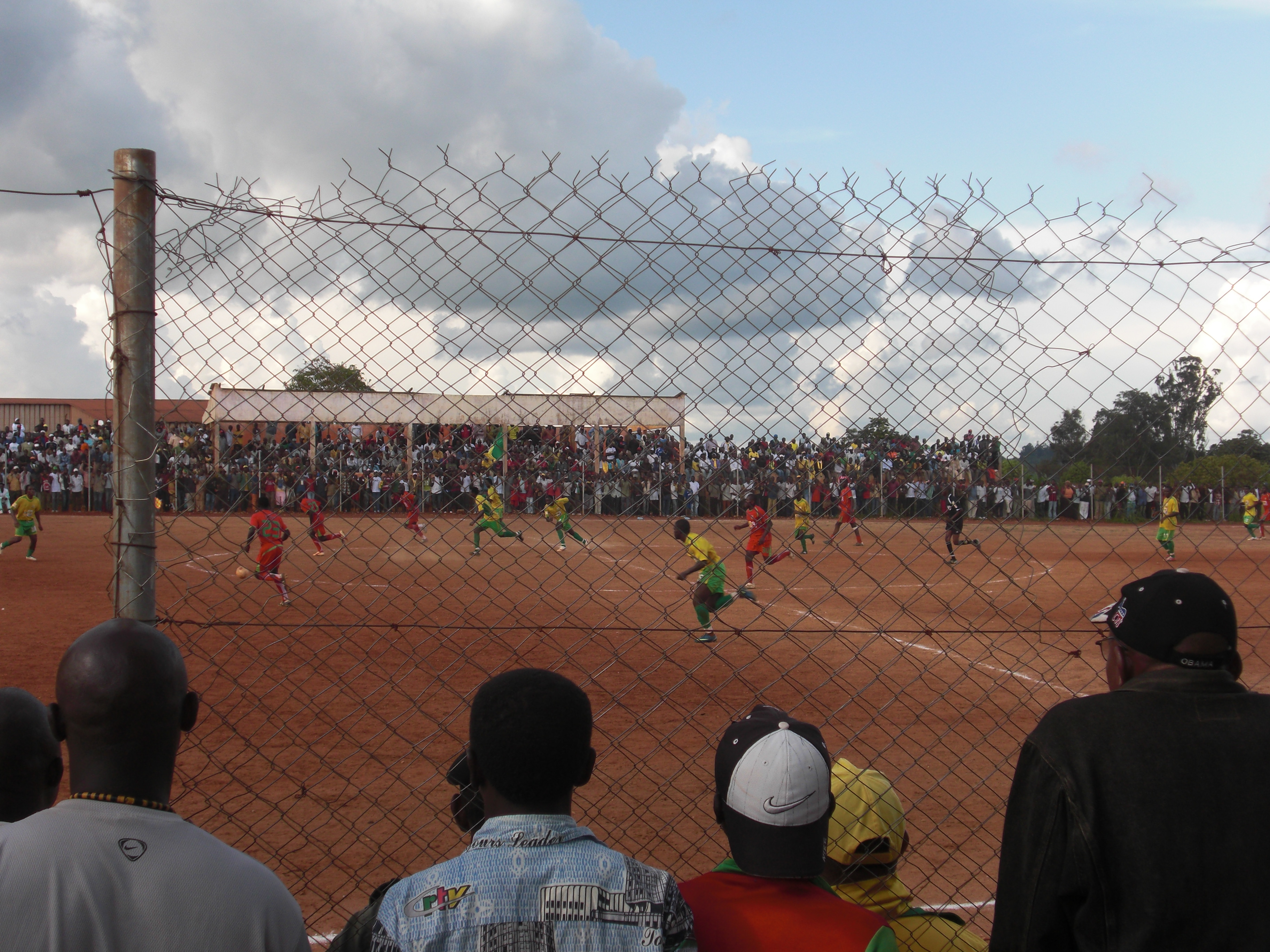
Football Match at the Stadium in Bangangté, Cameroon

Stade Municipal de Bangangté is a multi-use stadium in Bangangté, Cameroon. It is currently used mostly for football matches, on club level by Panthère du Ndé of the Elite One (season 2013). The stadium has a capacity of 2,000 expandable to 10,000 spectators.
