= Njombé =

- Commune and town
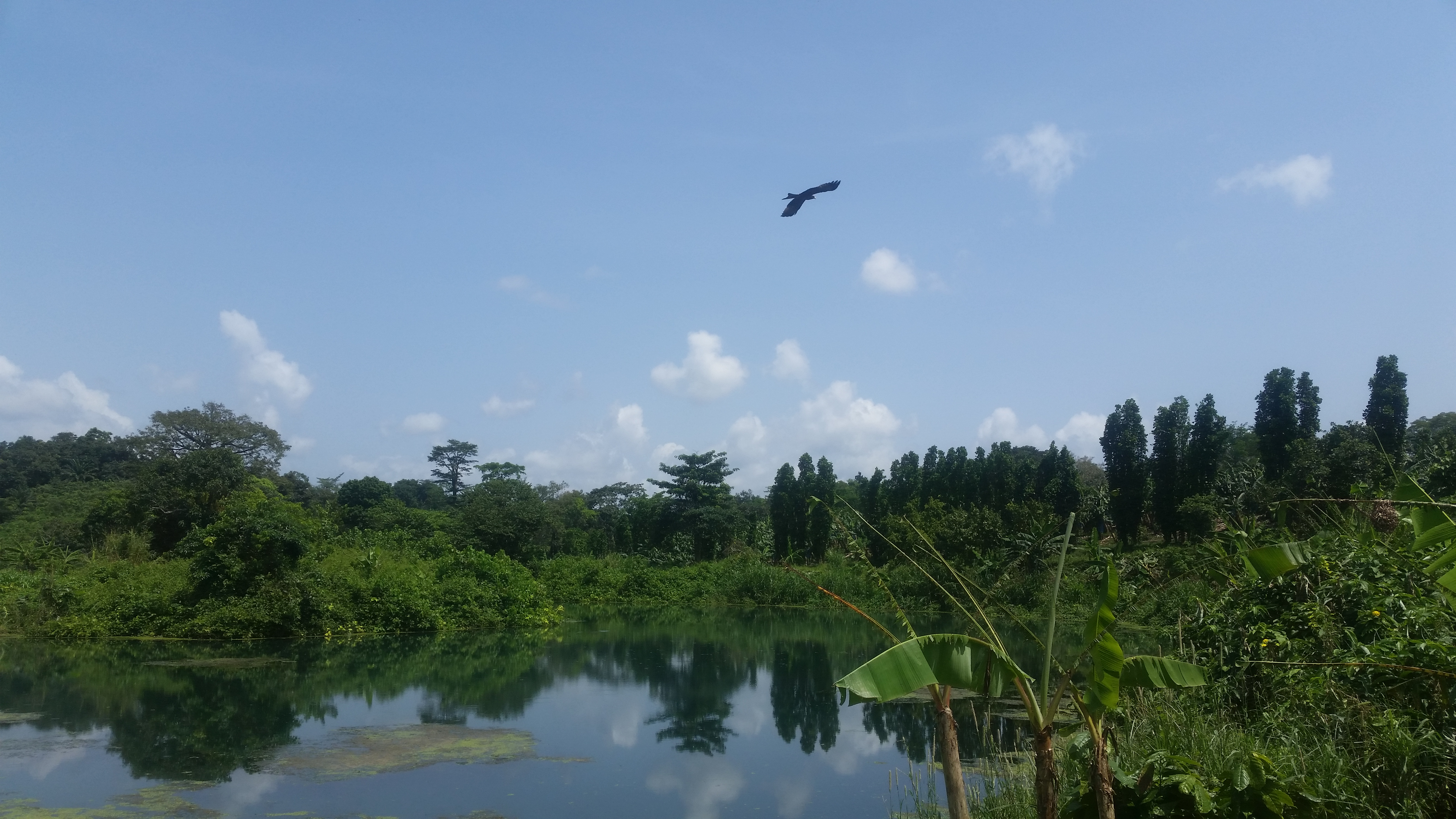
- Cofruca Artificial lake
- Interactive map of Njombé
- Coordinates: 4.5862°N 9.6543°E
- Country: Cameroon
- Time zone: UTC+1 (WAT)

Njombé is a town and commune in Cameroon.

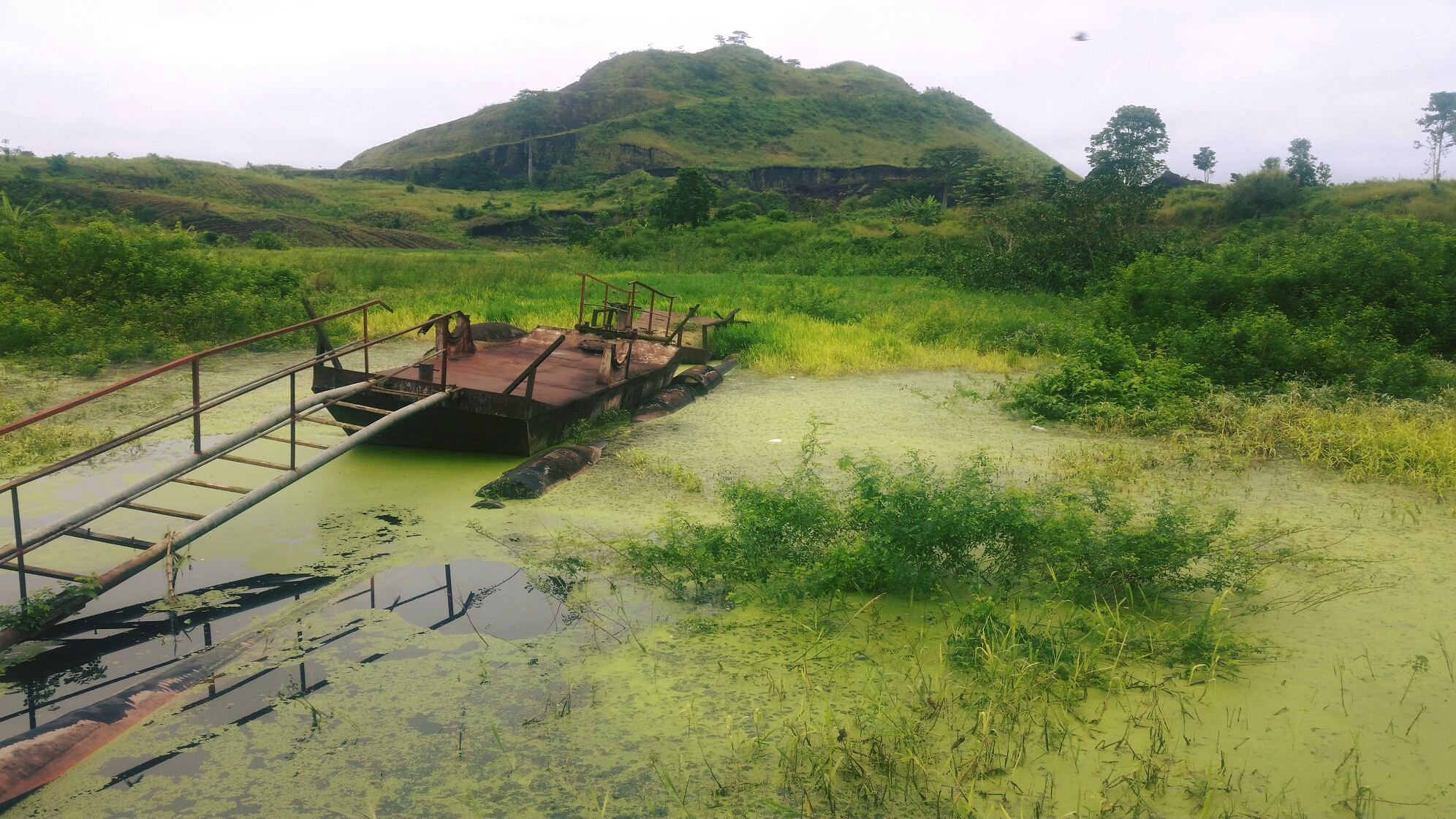
Mont Djoungo in Njombe

== See also ==
- Communes of Cameroon
