= Stade de Baham =

Sports venue in Baham, Cameroon

Coordinates: 5.32380°N 10.37057°E

Stade de Baham is a multi-use stadium in Baham, Cameroon. It is currently used mostly for football matches. It served as the former home ground of Fovu Baham. The stadium holds 7,000 people.
