= Stade Municipal (Bafang) =

Stadium in Bafang, Cameroon

Stade Municipal is a multi-use stadium in Bafang, Cameroon. It is currently used mostly for football matches and serves as a home ground of Unisport de Bafang of the Cameroon Première Division. The stadium holds 5,000 people.
