= Njalla Quan Sports Academy =

- Founded: September 2002
- Stadium: Limbe Stadium
- Owner: Henry Njalla Quan Jr.
- Chairman: Henry Njalla Quan Jr.
- League: South West Regional League
- Website: nqs-academy.com

Njalla Quan Sports Academy (NQSA) is a football club based in Limbé, Cameroon.

== History ==
It was founded in September 2000 by Henry Njalla Quan. The football club made its debut in the Elite One in the 2012 season. It was relegated from the premier division in 2015.
