= Eding Sport FC =

Cameroonian football club

Eding Sport
- Full name: Eding Sport Football Club
- Founded: 2012
- Ground: Lekié
- Capacity: 2,000
- League: Elite Two
- 2024–25: Elite Two, 8th
Home colours

Eding Sport Football Club is a Cameroonian football club based in Lekié. The club achieved steep success as they progressed from the Center Regional league, to Cameroon's Elite 2, right to Cameroon's first division. They became champions of Cameroon in 2016–2017 season only one season after promotion, which qualified them for the playoffs of 2018 CAF Champions League, but were eliminated at the first round.

Eding were relegated in 2023.

== Stadium ==
The club plays its home games at the Stade de Ngoa Ekélé in Yaoundé. The stadium has a capacity of 2,000 people.

== Notable players ==
- David Eto'o
- Martin Ako Assomo
- Jacques Zoua
- Albert Meyong
- Christian Bayemi
