= Stade de Mbouda =

Multi-use stadium in Mbouda, Cameroon

Stade de Mbouda is a multi-use stadium in Mbouda, Cameroon. It is currently used mostly for football matches. It serves as a home ground of Bamboutos FC. The stadium holds 12,000 people.

Mbouda was selected as first of a series of ten Cameroonian cities to be part of a program to upgrade football facilities in Cameroon. Consequently, Stade de Mbouda was renovated, extended and can be ranked second stadium in the Cameroonian western province, which hosts five of overall fourteen first division teams in Cameroon. After this face lifting, that was jointly financed by the Cameroonian Football Association (FECAFOOT) and MTN (as part of social engagement), the re-inauguration of Stade de Mbouda was scheduled on January 31.
