= Cosmos de Bafia =

Cameroonian football club

- Full name: Cosmos Football Academy de Bafia
- Ground: Stade de Bafia, Bafia
- Capacity: 5,000
- League: Elite One

Cosmos Football Academy de Bafia is a Cameroonian football club based in Bafia. They are a member of the Cameroonian Football Federation and Elite One, the topflight football league of Cameroon.

== Stadium ==
Currently the team plays at the Stade de Bafia.
