= Botafogo FC (Douala) =

- Full name: Botafogo Football Club de Douala
- League: Elite One

Botafogo Football Club de Douala is a Cameroonian football club. They are a member of the Cameroonian Football Federation and currently play in the top domestic league Elite One.
