= UMS de Loum =

- Full name: Union des Mouvements Sportifs de Loum
- Nickname: UMS
- Founded: 2011; 15 years ago
- Ground: Stade de Njombé, Njombé
- Capacity: 1,000
- President: Daniel Aboule
- Manager: Fabricio Goncalves Mendes
- League: Elite One
- 2019–20: 9th
Home colours

Union des Mouvements Sportifs de Loum (known simply as UMS de Loum) is a Cameroonian professional football club based in Loum. They are a member of the Cameroonian Football Federation and Elite One, the topflight football league of Cameroon. Currently the team plays at the Stade de Njombé.

UMS de Loum won its first Cameroon Cup in 2015, defeating Coton Sport, Canon Yaoundé and Union Douala on their way to the final where they defeated Panthère du Ndé 2–0.

== Honours ==
- Cameroon Premiere Division

Champions: 2016, 2019

- Cameroon Cup

Winners: 2015

== Performance in CAF competitions ==
- CAF Champions League: 3 appearances

2017 – Preliminary Round
2019 – Preliminary Round
2020 – Preliminary Round

- CAF Confederation Cup: 1 appearance

2016 – First Round
