= Dragon Club (Yaoundé) =

- Full name: Dragon Club de Yaoundé
- Ground: Stade Municipal de Mbalmayo
- Capacity: 1,000
- Manager: Francois Ngoumou
- League: Elite Two
- 2023–24: 8th

Dragon Club de Yaoundé is a Cameroonian football club. They are a member of the Cameroonian Football Federation and currently play in the domestic league Elite Two.
