= New Star de Douala =

Cameroonian football club

New Star FC is a football club in Douala, Cameroon. They play in Elite One, the highest division of Cameroonian football league system. Stade de la Réunification, which has a capacity of 39,000, is their home venue. They played in the 2016 CAF Confederation Cup.
