= Yong Sports Academy =

- Full name: Yong Sports Academy
- Nickname(s): YOSA Bamenda
- Founded: 2004; 21 years ago
- Ground: Bamenda Municipal Stadium
- Capacity: 5,000
- Chairman: Emma Mimba
- Manager: Alexandre Belinga
- League: Elite One
- 2023–24: 6th
Home colours	Away colours

Yong Sports Academy (YOSA) is a football club in Bamenda, Cameroon. Founded in 2004, it competes in the country's top division Elite One.

== History ==
Yong Sports Academy was founded in 2004 by Yong Francis, a former football referee. At that time, it was the only first division team in the Northwest Region of Cameroon. YOSA initially struggled to qualify for Inter-polls, the playoff for qualification for the First Division Championship - mostly against established teams.

In 2013, the team won Cameroon's National Football Cup.

== Stadium ==
The team plays in Stade Municipal Mankon in Bamenda which has a capacity of 5,000 spectators.

The Bamenda Municipal Stadium YOSA has two professional pitches in the academy situated in the outskirts of Nkwen Bamenda. To accommodate its growing fan base, YOSA plays its matches at the city stadium despite its poor state. This is because the club's fans are mostly based in the city center.
