= Elite Two =

MTN Elite two
- Country: Cameroon
- Confederation: CAF
- Number of clubs: 14
- Level on pyramid: 2
- Promotion to: MTN Elite One
- Relegation to: Regional Leagues
- Domestic cup: Cameroon Cup
- Current champions: Racing FC
- Current: 2025–26

Elite Two (or Cameroon Deuxième Division) called MTN Elite Two for Sponsorship reasons, is the second division of the Cameroon association football league system. It is organised by the Cameroonian Football Federation. Teams get promoted to the Elite One and get relegated to the Regional Leagues

== Current Members (2021–22) ==
Source.

Team	Location	Stadium	Capacity
Achille FC	Yaoundé		
Aigle Royal de la Menoua	Dschang	Stade Municipal (Dschang)	5,000
APEJES Academy	Yaoundé	Ahmadou Ahidjo Stadium	42,500
AS Matelots	Douala	Stade de la Réunification	39,000
Botafogo FC	Douala		
Cosmos de Bafia	Bafia	Stade de Bafia	5,000
Dragon FC	Yaoundé		
Feutcheu FC	Bandjoun		
National Polytechnic FC	Bamenda		
Racing FC	Bafussam		
Sahel FC	Maroua	Stade Municipal (Maroua)	5,000
UMS de Loum	Njombé	Stade de Njombé	1,000
Université FC de Ngaoundéré	Ngaoundéré	Stade Municipal Ndoumbe Oumar	2,000
Scorpion de Mbé	Mbé		
