= APEJES Academy =

A.P.E.J.E.S de Mfou
- Full name: A.P.E.J.E.S Academy de Mfou
- Ground: Stade Ahmadou Ahidjo
- Capacity: 40,122
- Chairman: Ambroise Ngandjong
- Manager: Pascal Gouokou
- League: Elite One

A.P.E.J.E.S Academy de Mfou is a Cameroonian professional football club based in Yaounde. They are a member of the Cameroonian Football Federation and Elite One, the topflight football league of Cameroon.

== Achievements ==
- Cameroon Cup: 1
  - 2016
