= Mbappé (disambiguation) =

Kylian Mbappé (born 1998) is a French footballer.

Mbappé may also refer to:

- Ethan Mbappé (born 2006), French footballer, Kylian's brother
- Samuel Mbappé Léppé (1936–1985), Cameroonian footballer
- Wilfrid Mbappé (born 1970), French consultant and football coach, Kylian's father

== See also ==
- Stade Mbappé Léppé, multi-use stadium in Douala, Cameroon
