= Wilfrid Mbappé =

French football coach and consultant

- Born: Elie Wilfrid Mbappé Lottin; 11 October 1970 (age 56); Douala, Cameroon
- Citizenship: Cameroon (until 2005); France (since 2005)
- Occupation: Consultant
- Partner: Fayza Lamari (2016–2022)
- Children: Kylian Mbappé Ethan Mbappé

Elie Wilfrid Mbappé Lottin (born 11 October 1970) is a consultant and former football coach. He is the father of footballers Kylian Mbappé and Ethan Mbappé.

== Early life ==
Elie Wilfrid Mbappé Lottin was born on 11 October 1970 in Douala, Cameroon. He is originally from Djébalè, an island in the Wouri estuary near Douala.

== Career ==
A former regional footballer, Mbappé coached AS Bondy for over 20 years, where he trained Steeven Joseph-Monrose, Fabrice Nsakala, Sébastien Corchia, Jonathan Ikoné, William Saliba and Ateef Konaté, his sons Kylian and Ethan Mbappé, and his adopted son Jirès Kembo Ekoko. Mbappé later devoted himself to his son Kylian's career, advising him on football matters. Kylian's mother, Fayza Lamari, managed Kylian's communications, image, and social projects with the help of a lawyer. During the 2022 FIFA World Cup, Mbappé was a consultant for the Togolese television channel New World Sport, alongside Emmanuel Adebayor, Basile Boli and Bonaventure Kalou.

In a 2022 interview with L'Équipe, Mbappé made a controversial statement about the role of money in professional football:

The world of football today is more about money and business than about the love and excitement of the game. It is not natural for a ten-year-old to dream of getting into football just to make money, and one day a child told me that he wanted to earn income like Kylian Mbappé. When my generation started in football, love for the ball and the pitch took priority; social and financial success came second. But today things have changed; even parents enter the field with concepts such as contracts and their child's financial future in mind from the very beginning. This new perspective shows that football, once a symbol of passion, excitement and entertainment, is now more than ever involved in the temptations of money and fame.

== Personal life ==
Mbappé lived with Fayza Lamari. The two signed a civil partnership in 2016 and separated in 2022. Their two children, Kylian and Ethan, are professional footballers. Mbappé is the legal guardian of the former professional footballer Jirès Kembo Ekoko.

In February 2023, a 48-year-old man known as "Mohamed A." was tried by a Versailles court and found guilty of impersonating Mbappé between December 2021 and January 2023 in order to obtain a residence permit in France. The man was sentenced to 10 months in prison.
