= Fayza Lamari =

French sports agent, businesswoman and handball player

- Born: 17 September 1974 (age 52); Bondy, France
- Occupation: Handball player Businesswoman Sports agent
- Partner: Wilfrid Mbappé (2016–2022)
- Children: Kylian Mbappé Ethan Mbappé

Fayza Lamari (born 17 September 1974) is a French former handball player and businesswoman.

She is the advisor to her sons Kylian and Ethan Mbappé, and the president of Interconnected Venture, a public relations and communications consulting company for professional footballers. The company has also owned SM Caen since 2024.

== Early life and education ==
Fayza Lamari was born in Bondy to Algerian parents, Mohamed Said Lamari and Saliha Ait Abbas. Her family is Kabyle and from Amizour. She played handball for Bondy Handball Association from 1990 to 2001, a team that spent several seasons in the French Women's Handball League. After graduating in educational sciences, Lamari worked as an instructor and supervisor in recreation centers.

== Career ==
Lamari played a prominent role in managing her son Kylian Mbappé's career from its early stages, while her then-partner, Wilfrid Mbappé, focused more on the sporting aspects. When Kylian joined AS Monaco at age 15, she left her job and took on the role of advisor in finance, image rights, and communications.

She heads several companies founded by son Kylian; companies that operate in the field of exploiting the image of professional athletes, providing communications consulting and implementing advertising campaigns. These companies include Interconnected Venture, Tathou, as well as the audiovisual production company Zebra Valley, launched in partnership with the Hollywood agency WME Sports. She is also, alongside Kylian, a director of Ohzora, the family real estate company.

Lamari also manages the Inspired by KM foundation, which was founded by Kylian himself in 2020. The goal of this association is to help young people between the ages of 13 and 21 realize their professional dreams in the fields of culture, sports, and education. She stated that in return for her commitment, she convinced her son to donate 30 percent of his companies' profits to the association.

In 2022, she played a key role in her son Kylian's negotiations with Real Madrid and Paris Saint-Germain, negotiations that ultimately led to his contract extension with Paris Saint-Germain, although Lamari herself wanted him to leave. In June of that year, she launched the FLA agency to advise and represent the interests of footballers, including her two sons, Kylian and Ethan, a move that has led to her being described as "one of the most powerful figures in football".

== Personal life ==
Lamari lived with French-Cameroonian Wilfrid Mbappé for many years. The two signed a civil partnership in 2016 and separated in 2022. They have two sons, Kylian and Ethan, both of whom are professional footballers. In addition, Lamari and Wilfrid also consider Congolese-French footballer Jirès Kembo Ekoko, whose legal guardian was Wilfrid when he moved to France, as their son.
