= Ligue 1 Young Player of the Year =

French football award

Ligue 1 Young Player of the season
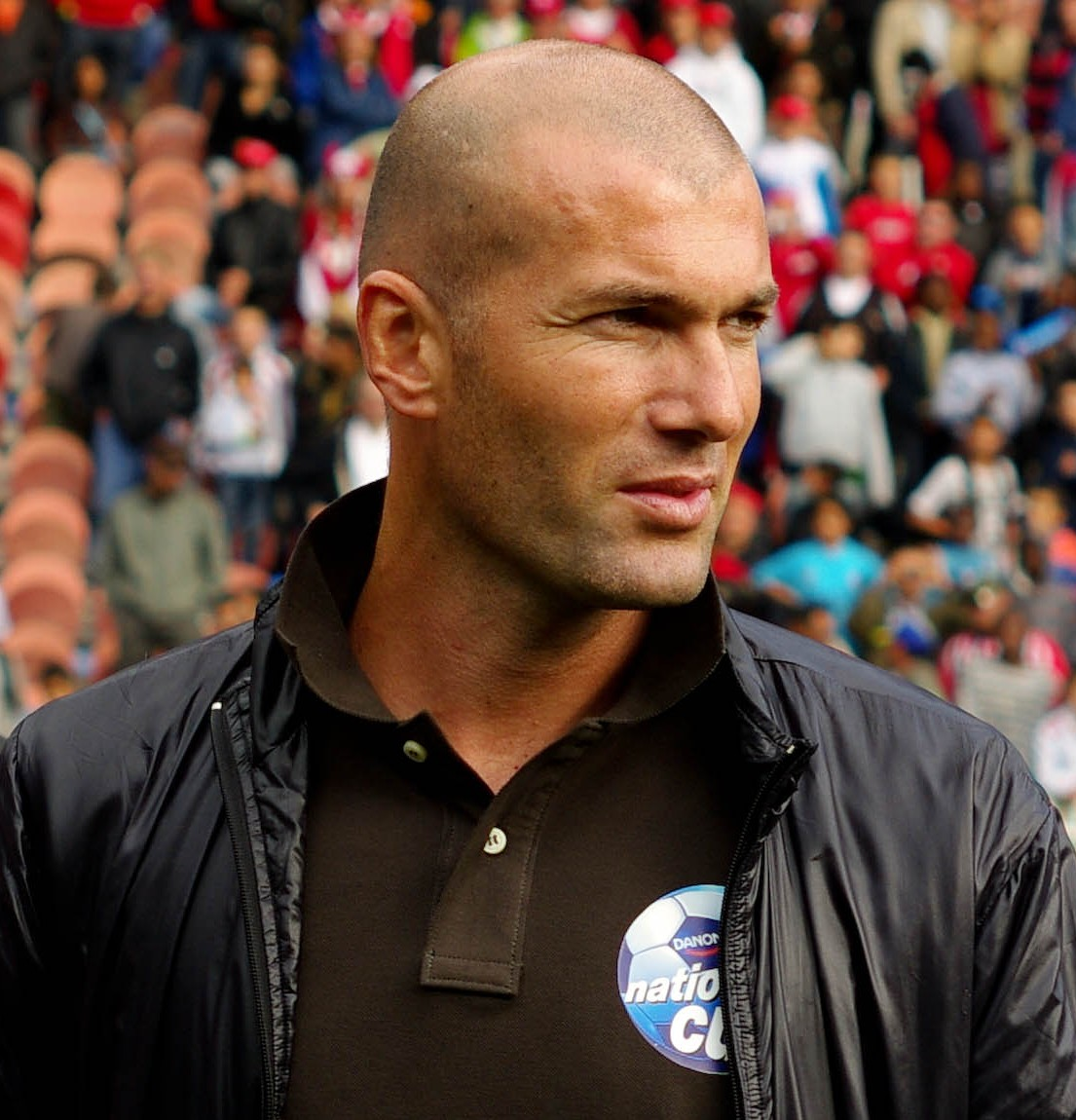
- Zinedine Zidane won the inaugural award in 1994 with Bordeaux.
- Sport: Association football
- League: Ligue 1
- Awarded for: being the best performing player in a Ligue 1 season whilst aged 23 years or under at the start of the season.
- Country: France
- Presented by: Union Nationale des Footballeurs Professionnels

History
- First award: 1994; 32 years ago
- First winner: (France) Zinedine Zidane
- Most wins: (France) Kylian Mbappé (3 awards)
- Most recent: (France) Désiré Doué (2025–26)

The UNFP Ligue 1 Young Player of the Year is an official award given by the Union Nationale des Footballeurs Professionnels (UNFP) to a player aged 23 years or under at the start of the season whose performances are considered to be the best in Ligue 1, France's top professional football league. The inaugural award was handed to midfielder Zinedine Zidane of Bordeaux, following the 1993–94 Division 1 season. It has been awarded ever since its inception, with the exception of the 2019−20 season, where the competition was abruptly cancelled due to the COVID-19 pandemic.

The award has been given to 28 different players over the course of 31 seasons, with only Eden Hazard and Kylian Mbappé winning the award on more than one occasion. Of these players, only Mbappé has won the award three times. Hazard (Belgium), Marco Verratti (Italy), Younès Belhanda (Morocco), and Nuno Mendes (Portugal) are the only recipients of the award who represent a nation other than France.

Paris Saint-Germain attacking midfielder Désiré Doué is the most recent winner of the award, which was awarded to him for his performances in the 2025–26 Ligue 1 season.

== Winners ==
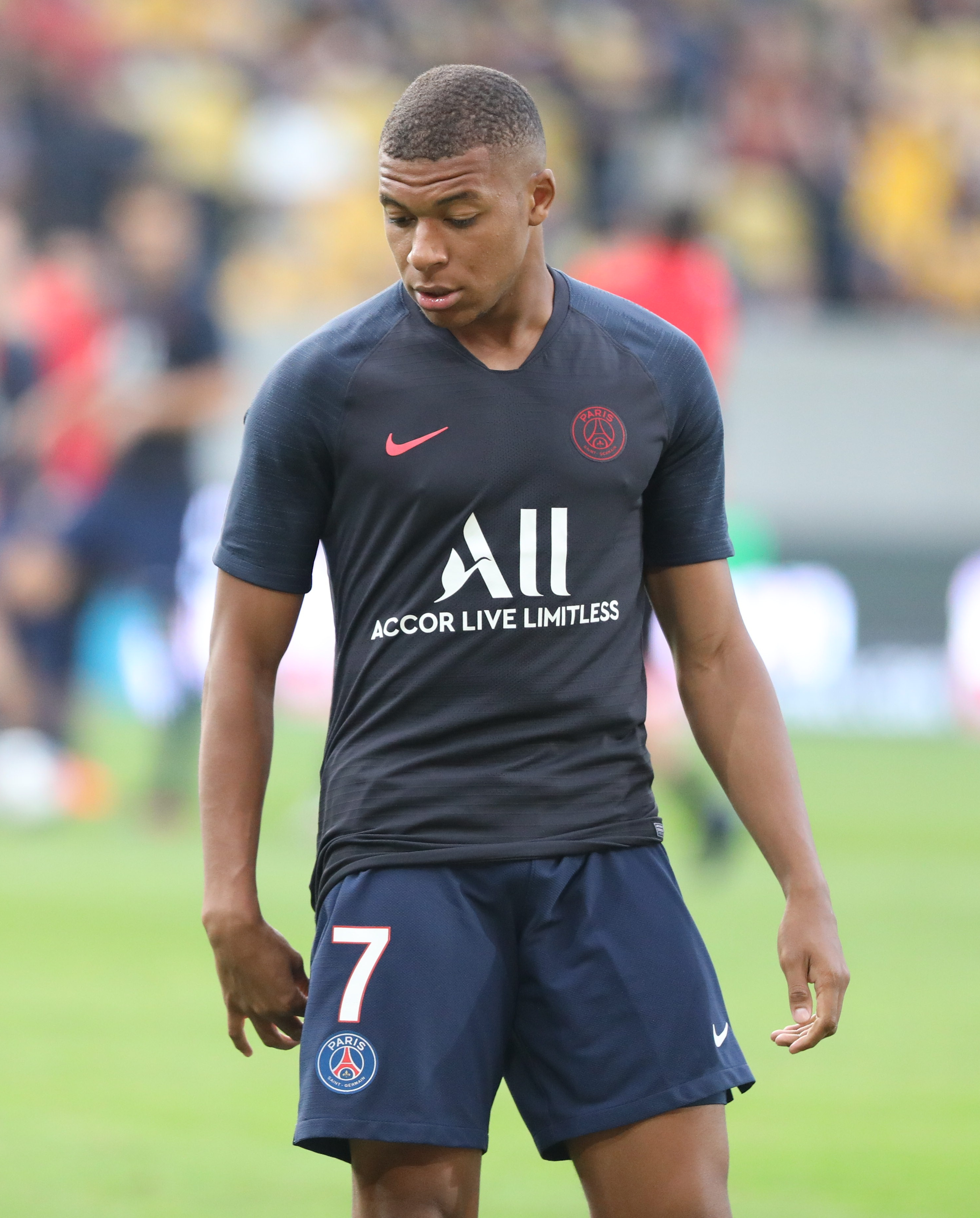
Kylian Mbappé has the most wins by a single player in the history of the awards, with three.

Award recipients
Season	Player	Nationality	Club	Position	Ref.
1993–94	Zinedine Zidane	France	Bordeaux	Midfielder	
1994–95	Florian Maurice	France	Lyon	Forward	
1995–96	Robert Pires	France	Metz	Forward	
1996–97	Thierry Henry	France	Monaco	Forward	
1997–98	David Trezeguet	France	Monaco	Forward	
1998–99	Olivier Monterrubio	France	Nantes	Midfielder	
1999–2000	Philippe Christanval	France	Monaco	Defender	
2000–01	Sidney Govou	France	Lyon	Forward	
2001–02	Djibril Cissé	France	Auxerre	Forward	
2002–03	Lionel Mathis	France	Auxerre	Midfielder	
2003–04	Patrice Evra	France	Monaco	Defender	
2004–05	Jérémy Toulalan	France	Nantes	Midfielder	
2005–06	Franck Ribéry	France	Marseille	Forward	
2006–07	Samir Nasri	France	Marseille	Midfielder	
2007–08	Hatem Ben Arfa	France	Lyon	Forward	
2008–09	Eden Hazard	Belgium	Lille	Forward	
2009–10	Eden Hazard (2)	Belgium	Lille	Forward	
2010–11	Mamadou Sakho	France	Paris Saint-Germain	Defender	
2011–12	Younès Belhanda	Morocco	Montpellier	Midfielder	
2012–13	Florian Thauvin	France	Bastia	Forward	
2013–14	Marco Verratti	Italy	Paris Saint-Germain	Midfielder	
2014–15	Nabil Fekir	France	Lyon	Forward	
2015–16	Ousmane Dembélé	France	Rennes	Forward	
2016−17	Kylian Mbappé	France	Monaco	Forward	
2017−18	Kylian Mbappé (2)	France	Paris Saint-Germain	Forward	
2018−19	Kylian Mbappé (3)	France	Paris Saint-Germain	Forward	
2019−20	Season cancelled due to COVID-19 pandemic				
2020−21	Aurélien Tchouaméni	France	Monaco	Midfielder	
2021−22	William Saliba	France	Marseille	Defender	
2022−23	Nuno Mendes	Portugal	Paris Saint-Germain	Defender	
2023−24	Warren Zaïre-Emery	France	Paris Saint-Germain	Midfielder	
2024–25	Désiré Doué	France	Paris Saint-Germain	Midfielder	
2025–26	Désiré Doué (2)	France	Paris Saint-Germain	Midfielder	

=== Multiple wins ===
Multiple wins
Rank	Player	Total	Seasons
1	Kylian Mbappé (FRA)	3	2016−17, 2017−18, 2018−19
2	Désiré Doué (FRA)	2	2024–25, 2025–26
2	Eden Hazard (BEL)	2	2008−09, 2009−10

=== Awards won by club ===
Awards won by club
Club	Total
Paris Saint-Germain	8
Monaco	6
Lyon	4
Marseille	3
Auxerre	2
Lille	2
Nantes	2
Bastia	1
Bordeaux	1
Metz	1
Montpellier	1
Rennes	1

=== Awards won by nationality ===
Awards won by nationality
Nationality	Total
France	27
Belgium	2
Italy	1
Morocco	1
Portugal	1

=== Awards won by playing position ===
Awards won by playing position
Position	Total
Forward	16
Midfielder	11
Defender	5
Goalkeeper	0
