= William Saliba =

French footballer (born 2001)

- Saliba with France in 2026

Personal information
- Full name: William Alain André Gabriel Saliba
- Date of birth: 24 March 2001 (age 25)
- Place of birth: Bondy, France
- Height: 1.92 m (6 ft 4 in)
- Position: Centre-back

Team information
- Current team: Arsenal
- Number: 2

Youth career
- 2008–2014: AS Bondy
- 2014–2016: Montfermeil
- 2016–2018: Saint-Étienne

Senior career*
| Years | Team | Apps | (Gls) |
| 2018 | Saint-Étienne B | 3 | (0) |
| 2018–2019 | Saint-Étienne | 16 | (0) |
| 2019– | Arsenal | 131 | (7) |
| 2019–2020 | → Saint-Étienne (loan) | 12 | (0) |
| 2021 | → Nice (loan) | 20 | (1) |
| 2021–2022 | → Marseille (loan) | 36 | (0) |

International career^{‡}
| 2017 | France U16 | 7 | (1) |
| 2017–2018 | France U17 | 6 | (2) |
| 2018 | France U18 | 5 | (1) |
| 2018 | France U19 | 3 | (0) |
| 2019 | France U20 | 1 | (0) |
| 2021 | France U21 | 5 | (0) |
| 2022– | France | 38 | (0) |
Medal record
Men's football
Representing France
FIFA World Cup
| Runner-up | 2022 |
- * Club domestic league appearances and goals as of 22:08, 18 May 2026 (UTC) ‡ National team caps and goals as of 16:10, 15 July 2026 (UTC)

William Alain André Gabriel Saliba (French: [wiljam saliba]; born 24 March 2001) is a French professional footballer who plays as a centre-back for Premier League club Arsenal and the France national team. Considered one of the best defenders in the world, he is known for his strength, pace, tackling, and composure. (Note: Attributed to multiple references:)

Saliba began his career in 2018 with Saint-Étienne, helping them qualify for the UEFA Europa League. Saliba joined Arsenal in 2019 in a transfer for a reported fee of £27 million. After consecutive loan spells with Saint-Étienne, Nice and Marseille between 2019 and 2022, Saliba has become a first-team regular at Arsenal.

Saliba made his senior debut for France in 2022, and played for the side at the 2022 FIFA World Cup, UEFA Euro 2024 and the 2026 World Cup.

== Early life ==
William Alain André Gabriel Saliba was born on 24 March 2001 in Bondy, a commune in the northeastern suburbs of Paris in the department of Seine-Saint-Denis, to a Lebanese father and a Cameroonian mother. He began playing football at the age of six for local team AS Bondy, where he was coached by the father of Kylian Mbappé.

== Club career ==
=== Saint-Étienne ===
Saliba began playing for Saint-Étienne in 2016, and signed his first contract at age 17, in May 2018. Saliba then made his professional debut on 25 September 2018, featuring in a 3–2 Ligue 1 win over Toulouse. He made 13 starting appearances in his first season at Saint-Étienne.

After signing for Arsenal, Saliba returned to Saint-Étienne on loan for the 2019–20 season. He played 17 games for the club across the campaign, helping Saint-Étienne reach the 2020 Coupe de France Final; he missed the match as the loan agreement ended two weeks prior to the final, which was delayed due to the COVID-19 pandemic.

Although looking to temporarily extend his loan, had Saliba featured, Arsenal reportedly would have been due to pay Saint-Étienne €2.5 million. The French club was reportedly reluctant to waive the fee and also requested full control over his training sessions. As a result, Saliba returned to Arsenal on 24 July 2020.

=== Arsenal ===
On 25 July 2019, Arsenal announced that Saliba had signed a long-term contract with the club. Media reported a contract duration of five years and that the transfer fee amounted to £27 million. Arsenal faced competition from rivals Tottenham Hotspur to complete the deal, with both clubs meeting Saint-Étienne's valuation of the player, however, Saliba chose to join Arsenal, with the club's interest in Saliba dating back to late 2018.

After spending the 2019–20 season on loan at former club Saint-Étienne, Saliba was handed the number 4 shirt upon his return to Arsenal in 2020. His first appearance for Arsenal was in a pre-season friendly match against MK Dons on 25 August 2020. He was also an unused substitute in the 2020 FA Community Shield, which Arsenal clinched by defeating Liverpool 5–4 in the penalty shootout after the match was level at 1–1 after 90 minutes. However, he was then left out of the club's competitive squads for the 2020–21 season, leaving him only able to play for Arsenal U23s, for whom he featured in EFL Trophy games away to Gillingham and AFC Wimbledon, receiving a red card in the latter fixture. Arsenal manager Mikel Arteta would later express "regret [over] the decision" before a January six-month loan move to France.

==== Loan to Nice ====
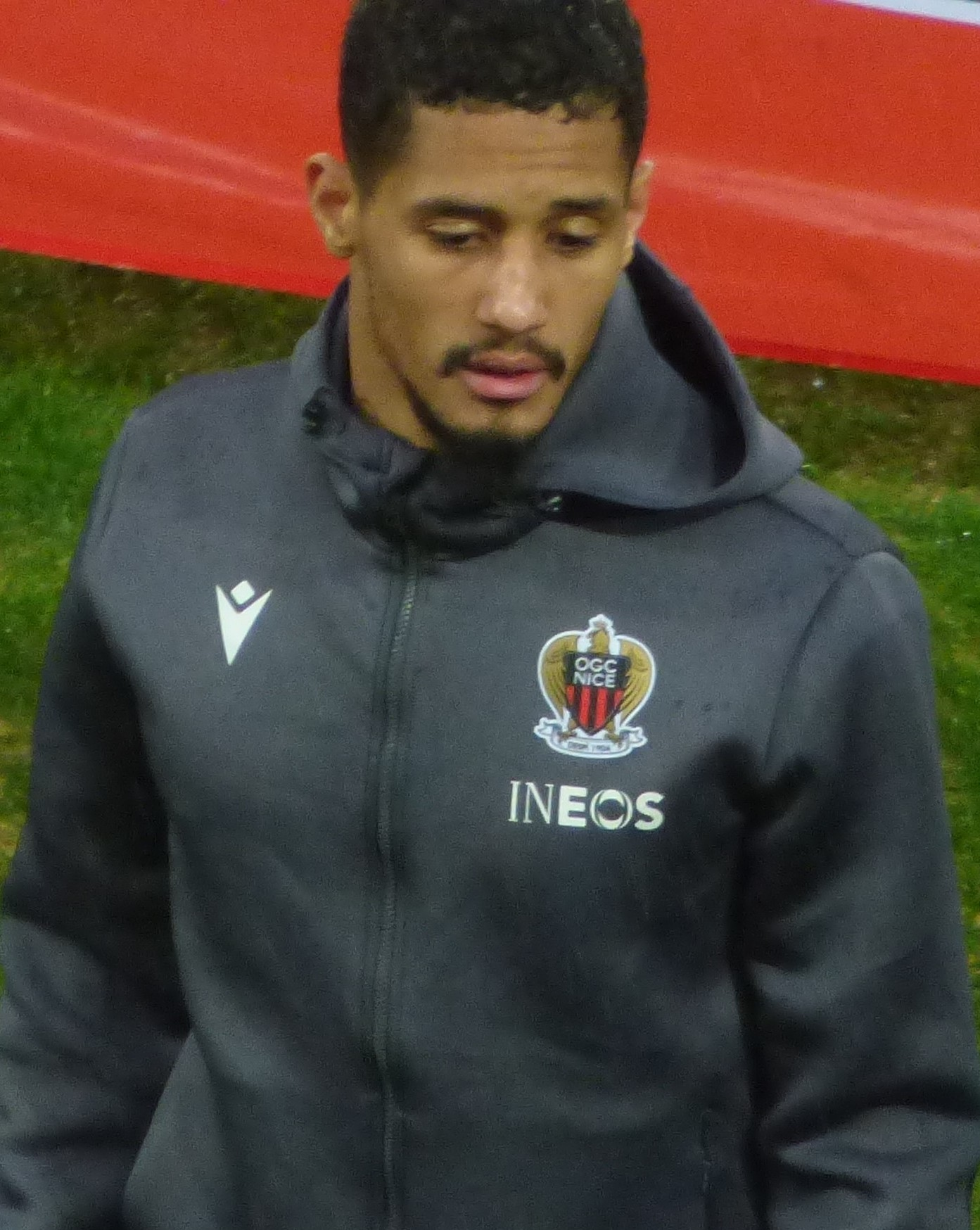
Saliba with Nice in 2021

On 4 January 2021, Saliba joined Ligue 1 club Nice on loan for the remainder of the 2020–21 season. He returned to France after reported plans for a loan to an unnamed EFL Championship club were scrapped. On 6 January 2021, he made his debut in a 2–0 loss against Brest in Ligue 1. Saliba was awarded Nice's Player of the Month award for his performances throughout January.

==== Loan to Marseille ====
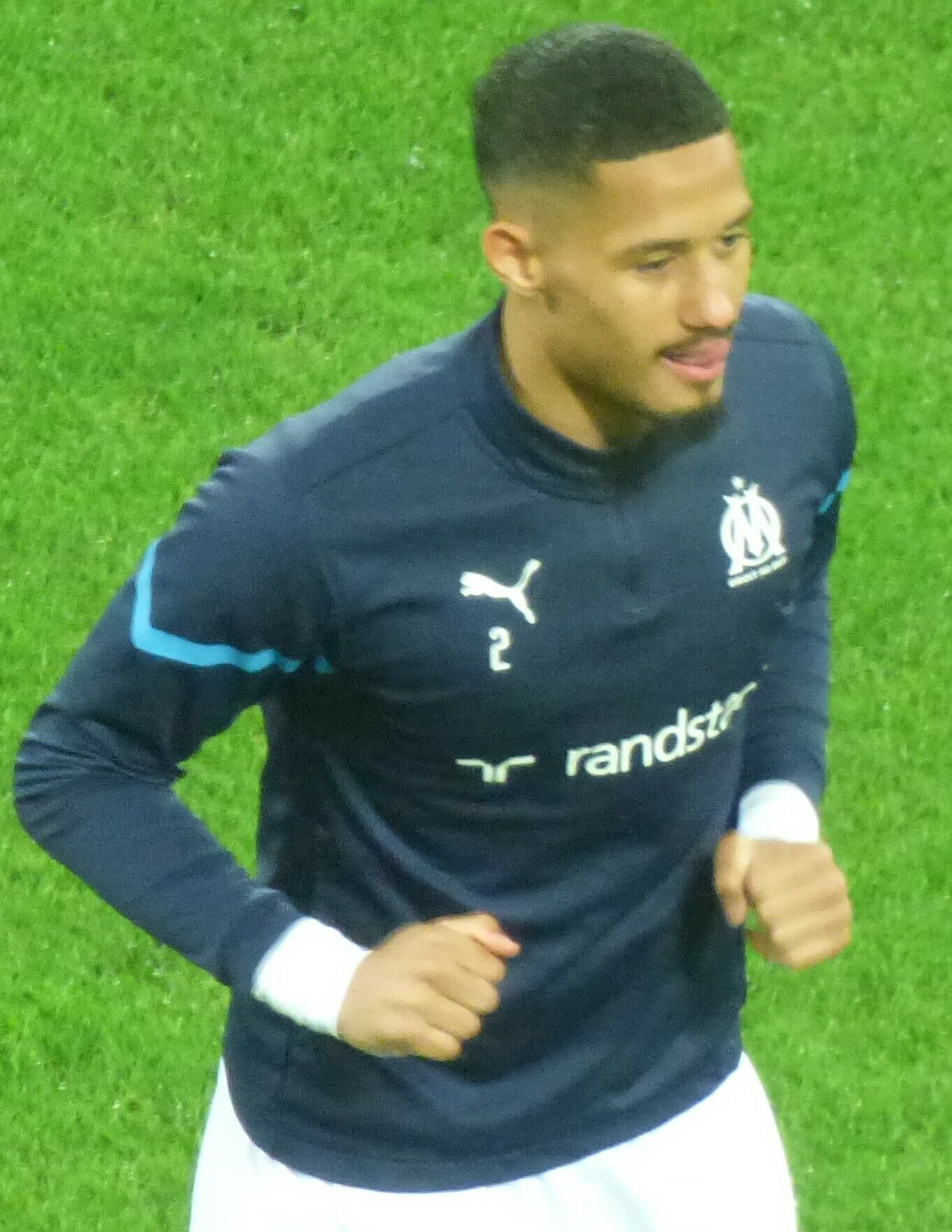
Saliba with Marseille in 2022

Saliba again left Arsenal for a loan in Ligue 1 in July 2021, joining Marseille for the 2021–22 season. With fellow Arsenal loanee Matteo Guendouzi, he made his competitive debut for the club when he started in a 3–2 away win against Montpellier on 8 August 2021. He would make a total of 52 appearances and help the club reach the semi-finals of the inaugural Europa Conference League season, while also securing Champions League football for the club's following season. Saliba was named as Ligue 1 Young player of the year and was awarded a position in the Team of the Year. Despite interest from Marseille and other European clubs for another season away from Arsenal, Saliba announced his desire to return to Arsenal when speaking with French football programme Téléfoot.

==== Return to Arsenal ====
===== 2022–23 =====
Ahead of the 2022–23 season, Saliba was given the number 12 shirt. He made his Arsenal and Premier League debut on 5 August 2022 in an opening day fixture away to Crystal Palace. Arsenal won the game 2–0, with Saliba's performance being described by the BBC as "unruffled and virtually faultless". He scored his first goal for the club two weeks later in a win over AFC Bournemouth, with a curled shot from the edge of the box. The strike was voted as the club's Goal of the Month for August.

On 16 March 2023, Saliba picked up a back injury in Arsenal's Europa League match against Sporting CP, which would ultimately rule him out for the rest of the season. He had played in all of Arsenal's Premier League games up until then and it was initially thought that he would return within a few weeks to aid in Arsenal's title run-in. His absence proved to be crucial, as Arsenal struggled defensively, and their subsequent dip in form saw them surrender their lead at the top of the table to eventual champions Manchester City.

===== 2023–24 =====
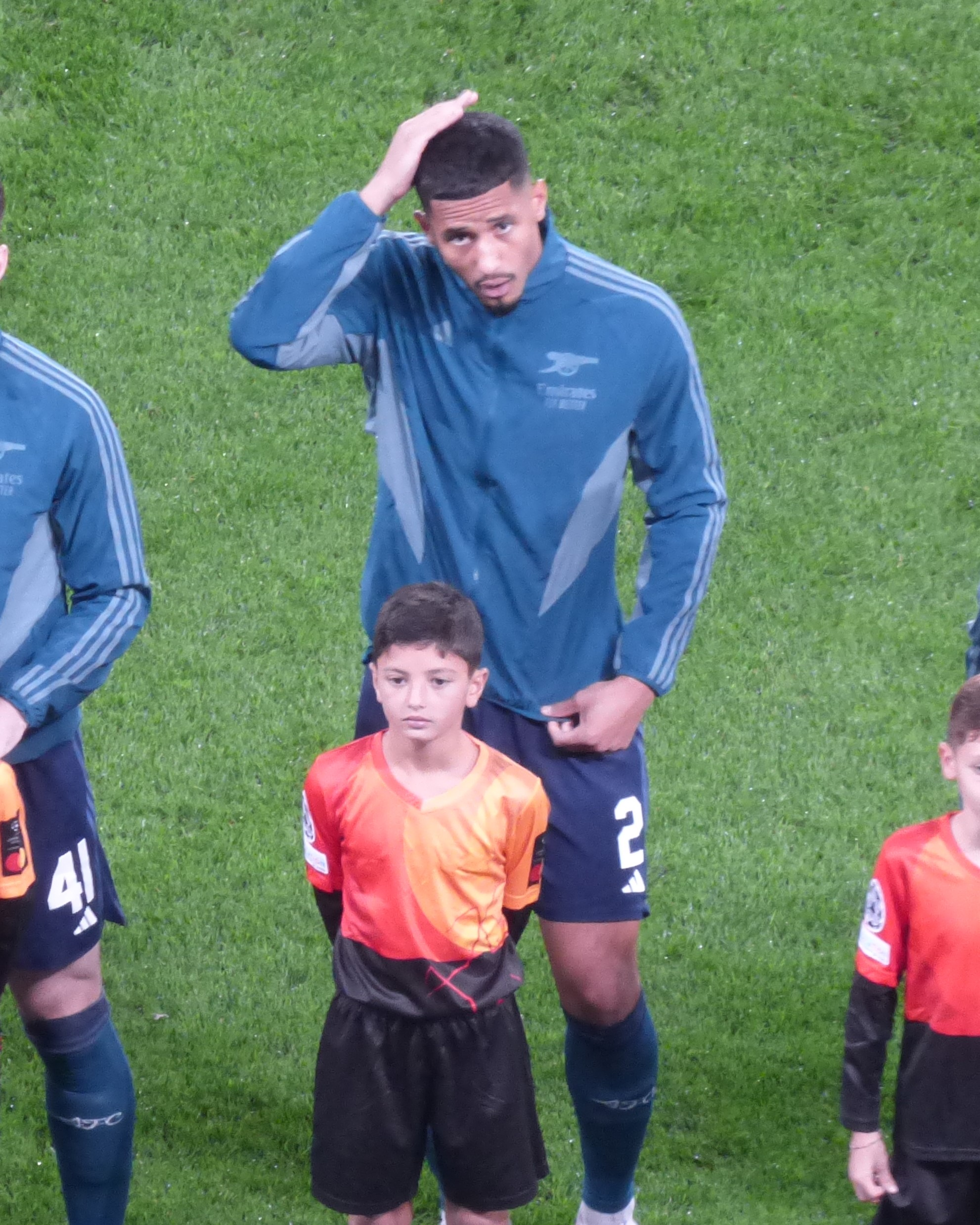
Saliba lining up for Arsenal in 2023

On 7 July 2023, Saliba signed a new long-term deal with the club until 2028 and was given the number 2 shirt. After coming through Arsenal’s pre-season campaign unscathed, Saliba made his competitive first-team comeback since recovering from his back injury on 6 August, as the Gunners beat Manchester City 4–1 on penalties after a 1–1 draw in the Community Shield at Wembley Stadium. In the 2023–24 season, he became the first Arsenal outfield player who played every minute (3,420) of a season for the club in the Premier League era. Saliba scored twice this season, both times in Premier League wins for Arsenal. His first was against Burnley (3–1) on 11 November 2023. He then scored the first goal in a 6–0 thrashing of West Ham United at London Stadium on 11 February 2024.

===== 2024–25 =====
Saliba received the first red card of his professional career in a 2–0 loss at the Vitality Stadium on 19 October 2024, when he was shown a straight red (Arsenal's third dismissal in their opening eight league matches of the 2024–25 season) for taking down Bournemouth striker Evanilson on the halfway line in what was controversially deemed by referee Robert Jones to be a clear goal-scoring opportunity. On 4 December 2024, Saliba scored his first goal of the 2024–25 campaign, deflecting in Thomas Partey's header against Manchester United in the 2–0 victory. He scored again that week against Fulham, this time in a 1–1 draw at Craven Cottage.

===== 2025–26 =====
On 30 September 2025, Saliba signed a new long-term deal with the club until 2030. He scored his only goal of the season on 1 March 2026, in Arsenal’s 2–1 win against their west London rivals Chelsea. He played a key role in helping his team win the Premier League title after a 22-year wait and reach their second-ever Champions League final.

== International career ==
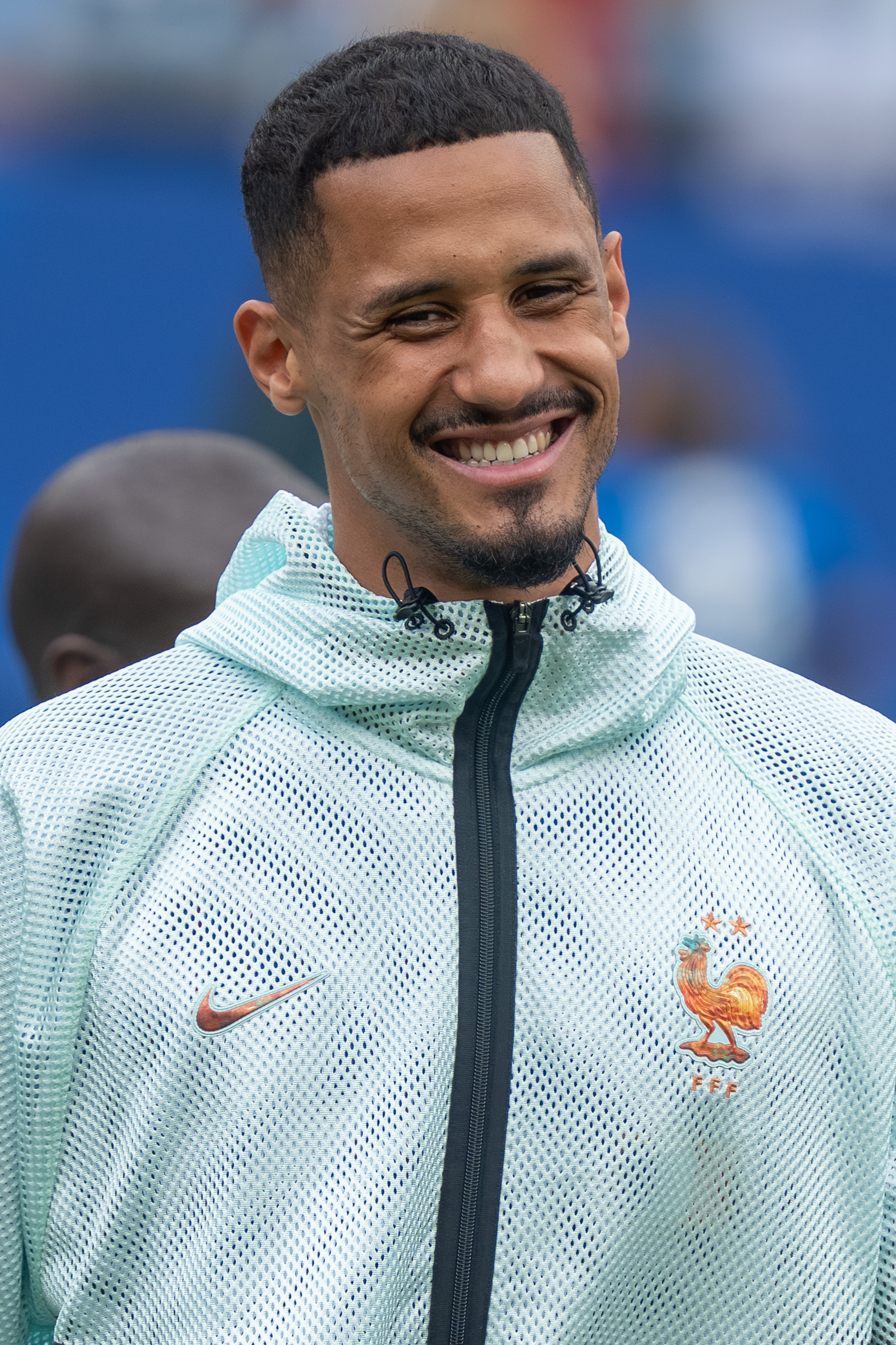
Saliba with France at the 2026 FIFA World Cup

On 21 March 2022, Saliba received a call-up to France's senior squad for the first time as an injury replacement to Benjamin Pavard to play in friendlies against the Ivory Coast and South Africa. He played in five of France's 2022–23 UEFA Nations League games. In November 2022, Saliba was called up to the 26-man France squad that would compete in Qatar for the 2022 FIFA World Cup. He made his tournament debut on 30 November, replacing Raphaël Varane in the 63rd minute of France's final group game against Tunisia. In May 2024, Saliba was included in France's squad for the UEFA Euro 2024.

On 14 May 2026, Saliba was selected in the 26-man squad for the 2026 FIFA World Cup. He sustained a back injury during the World Cup semi-finals against Spain which would sideline him for several months.

== Style of play ==
Saliba can play as part of a back three and is known for his partnership with Gabriel. Saliba is renowned for his ball-playing ability, footballing intelligence, and passing accuracy. Due to his composure and finesse, Saliba has been described as a "Rolls Royce" footballer by many, including Martin Keown and David O'Leary, both former Arsenal centre-backs.

== Personal life ==
Saliba is a Muslim. His mother died in 2020.

== Career statistics ==
=== Club ===
As of match played 30 May 2026

Appearances and goals by club, season and competition
| Club | Season | League | | | National cup (Note: Includes Coupe de France, FA Cup) | | League cup (Note: Includes Coupe de la Ligue, EFL Cup) | | Europe | | Other | | Total | |
| Club | Season | Division | Apps | Goals | Apps | Goals | Apps | Goals | Apps | Goals | Apps | Goals | Apps | Goals |
|---|---|---|---|---|---|---|---|---|---|---|---|---|---|---|
| Saint-Étienne II | 2017–18 | Championnat National 3 | 1 | 0 | — | | — | | — | | — | | 1 | 0 |
| Saint-Étienne II | 2018–19 | Championnat National 2 | 2 | 0 | — | | — | | — | | — | | 2 | 0 |
| Saint-Étienne II | Total | | 3 | 0 | — | | — | | — | | — | | 3 | 0 |
| Saint-Étienne | 2018–19 | Ligue 1 | 16 | 0 | 2 | 0 | 1 | 0 | — | | — | | 19 | 0 |
| Arsenal U21 | 2020–21 | — | | | — | | — | | — | | 2 (Note: Appearances in EFL Trophy) | 0 | 2 | 0 |
| Arsenal | 2022–23 | Premier League | 27 | 2 | 1 | 0 | 1 | 0 | 4 (Note: Appearances in UEFA Europa League) | 1 | — | | 33 | 3 |
| Arsenal | 2023–24 | Premier League | 38 | 2 | 1 | 0 | 0 | 0 | 10 (Note: Appearances in UEFA Champions League) | 0 | 1 (Note: Appearance in FA Community Shield) | 0 | 50 | 2 |
| Arsenal | 2024–25 | Premier League | 35 | 2 | 1 | 0 | 4 | 0 | 11 | 0 | — | | 51 | 2 |
| Arsenal | 2025–26 | Premier League | 31 | 1 | 2 | 0 | 5 | 0 | 12 | 0 | — | | 50 | 1 |
| Arsenal | Total | | 131 | 7 | 5 | 0 | 10 | 0 | 37 | 1 | 1 | 0 | 184 | 8 |
| Saint-Étienne (loan) | 2019–20 | Ligue 1 | 12 | 0 | 3 | 0 | 0 | 0 | 2 | 0 | — | | 17 | 0 |
| Nice (loan) | 2020–21 | Ligue 1 | 20 | 1 | 2 | 0 | — | | — | | — | | 22 | 1 |
| Marseille (loan) | 2021–22 | Ligue 1 | 36 | 0 | 3 | 0 | — | | 13 (Note: Six appearances in UEFA Europa League, seven appearances in UEFA Europa Conference League) | 0 | — | | 52 | 0 |
| Career total | | | 218 | 8 | 15 | 0 | 11 | 0 | 52 | 1 | 3 | 0 | 299 | 9 |

=== International ===
As of match played 14 July 2026

Appearances and goals by national team and year
| National team | Year | Apps | Goals |
|---|---|---|---|
| France | 2022 | 8 | 0 |
| France | 2023 | 4 | 0 |
| France | 2024 | 14 | 0 |
| France | 2025 | 5 | 0 |
| France | 2026 | 7 | 0 |
| Total | | 38 | 0 |

== Honours ==
Saint-Étienne

- Coupe de France runner-up: 2019–20

Arsenal

- Premier League: 2025–26
- FA Community Shield: 2020, 2023
- EFL Cup runner-up: 2025–26
- UEFA Champions League runner-up: 2025–26

France

- FIFA World Cup runner-up: 2022

Individual

- UNFP Ligue 1 Young player of the year: 2021–22
- UNFP Ligue 1 Team of the Year: 2021–22
- PFA Team of the Year: 2022–23 Premier League, 2023–24 Premier League, 2024–25 Premier League, 2025–26 Premier League
- Premier League Fan Team of the Season: 2023–24, 2024–25, 2025–26
- UEFA European Championship Team of the Tournament: 2024
- FIFA Men's World 11: 2024
- Ballon d’Or nominee: 2024, 2026
