= Jirès Kembo Ekoko =

French footballer (born 1988)

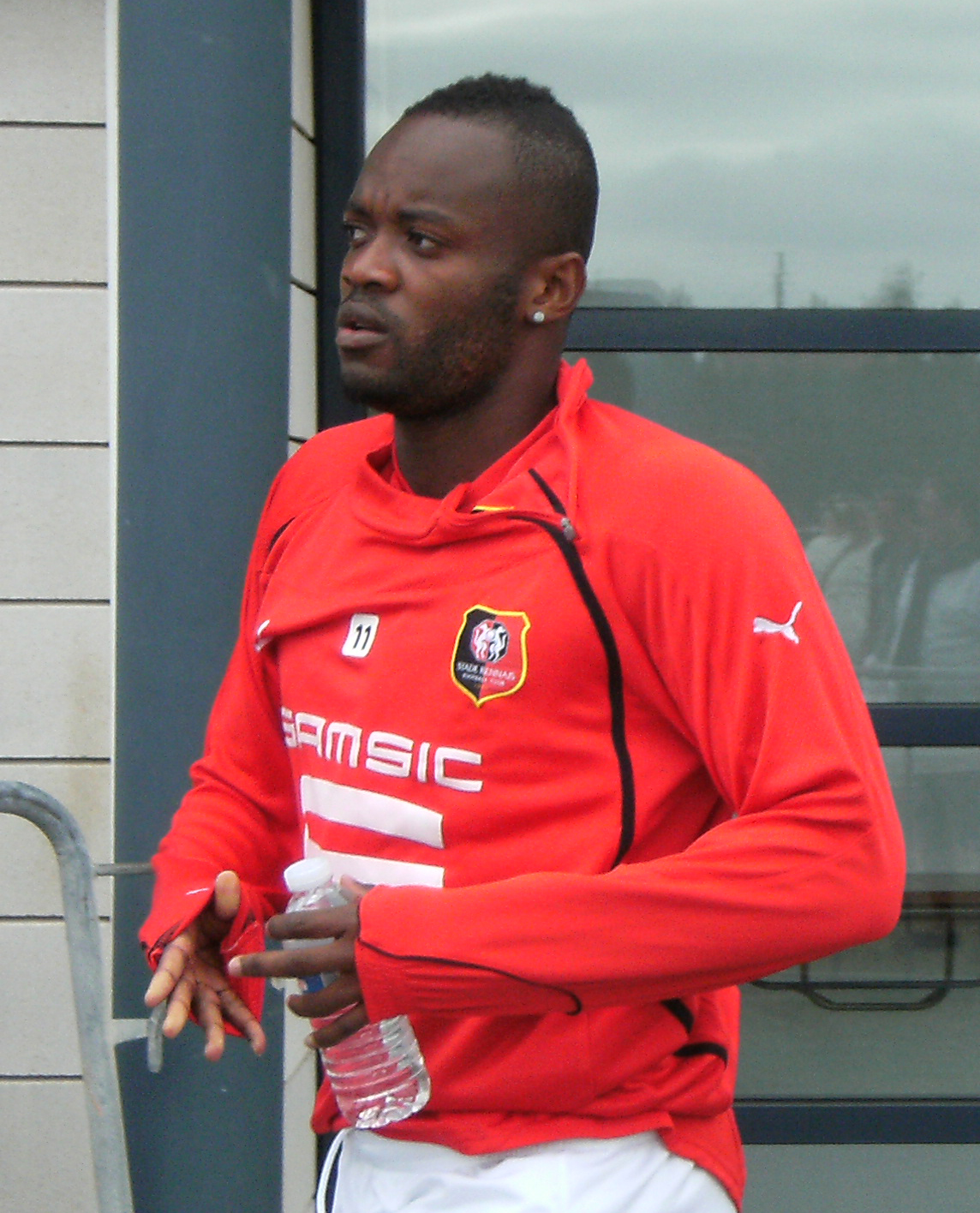
- Kembo Ekoko with Stade Rennais

Personal information
- Full name: Jirès Kembo Ekoko
- Date of birth: 8 January 1988 (age 38)
- Place of birth: Kinshasa, Zaire
- Height: 1.78 m (5 ft 10 in)
- Position: Striker

Youth career
- 1997–2001: Bondy
- 2001–2004: INF Clairefontaine
- 2004–2006: Rennes

Senior career*
Years	Team	Apps	(Gls)
2006–2012	Rennes	110	(16)
2012–2015	Al Ain	44	(19)
2013–2014	→ El Jaish (loan)	22	(6)
2015–2017	Al Nasr	46	(11)
2017–2019	Bursaspor	26	(4)
Total		248	(56)

International career
2009	France U21	13	(3)
- * Club domestic league appearances and goals

Jirès Kembo Ekoko (born 8 January 1988) is a French former professional footballer who played as a striker. Born in Zaire, Kembo Ekoko is a former youth international for France.

His father is Kembo Uba Kembo, who played for the Zaire national team in the 1974 FIFA World Cup.

== Early life ==
Jirès Kembo Ekoko was born on 8 January 1988 in Kinshasa, Zaire. His mother decided to send him to France at the age of six for education, while his parents remained in Zaire. Kembo Ekoko lived in Bondy, Île-de-France with his uncle and older sister. He was adopted by the Mbappé family, and is the adopted brother of Kylian Mbappé and Ethan Mbappé.

Kembo Ekoko began playing football in the street and was spotted by scouts while playing in school. In 1997, he signed with the youth team AS Bondy at the age of nine. Four years later, he joined the youth football academy Clairefontaine. After three years of training, he joined the football club Rennes, where he made an impression as a member of the youth team. Due to his technical skills, he was nicknamed "Kembinho" by his teammates. He eventually signed his first professional contract with Rennes.

== Club career ==
=== Stade Rennais ===
Kembo Ekoko made his debut with Rennes during a 2–1 loss against Lille. He played very little during his first season, which led several lower-division clubs to bid for him, but Rennes rejected the bids.

In his second season, Kembo Ekoko's playing time was limited. Under Pierre Dréossi, Kembo Ekoko played his first game in the UEFA Cup against Lokomotiv Sofia in a 2–1 loss, before coming off for Jérôme Leroy. In the next UEFA Cup match, Kembo Ekoko set up a goal for Bruno Cheyrou in a 1–1 draw against Brann. At the end of the season, he earned French citizenship, and a call up for the France national team.

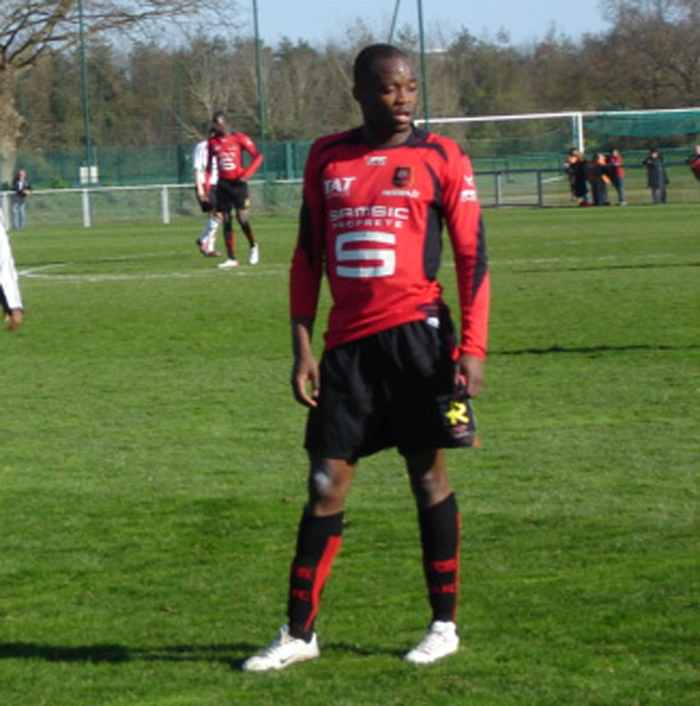
Kembo Ekoko in a match between Rennes and Guingamp reserve squads in 2007.

In his third season, Kembo Ekoko made 13 appearances and scored 3 goals, under Dréossi's successor Guy Lacombe. Under Lacombe, he received more playing time. In the third match of the Coupe de la Ligue against Le Mans on 24 September 2008, Kembo Ekoko scored his first Coupe de la Ligue goal in a 2–2 draw. As a result, he was linked with Reading F.C, although a bid was not accepted. The club would win 4–3 on penalties in the next round shootout to go through to the last sixteen of Coupe de France on 4 March 2009. Kembo also scored his first Coupe de France's goal in a 3–0 win over Lorient. A week later following his first Coupe de France goal, Kembo Ekoko scored his first league goal against Le Mans (the team he scored his first goal in Coupe de la Ligue). His performance suggested the club should give him more playing time, but he began to grow impatient with being on the bench and wanted more playing time. The club would reach the final of Coupe de France against Guingamp. Ahead of the match, Lacombe would put Olivier Thomert, Romain Danzé and Moussa Sow in three-way attack and the club is without injured Jimmy Briand and with the club losing 2–1, Kembo Ekoko came on as a substitute in a late minute for Bruno Cheyrou. In the end, Guingamp won their first title. Weeks after the final on 23 May 2009, Kembo Ekoko scored his second goal in a 3–1 win over Lorient. After the 2008–09 season, Lacombe would leave the club and was replaced by Frédéric Antonetti.

In his fourth season, many strikers like Briand, Sow and Mickaël Pagis all left the club but the club managed to bring Asamoah Gyan (his future Al Ain teammate) and Ismaël Bangoura putting Kembo Ekoko out of the first team. Despite being pushed out of the first team, he scored his first goal of the season in a 4–1 win over Toulouse on 20 March 2010. As his contract was set to expire at the end of the 2009–10 season, Kembo Ekoko signed a new contract, keeping him until 2013. Unlike the previous season, he barely received playing time at the club.

In his fifth season, Kembo Ekoko managed to make a return to the first team after Gyan and Bangoura both left the club, and received Víctor Montaño. This allowed manager Antonetti to give him more playing time He scored three goals in three games against Lyon, Auxerre and Brest. His performance led the federation of Congo to ask Kembo Ekoko to join the national team, in his father's footsteps, but he declined, insisting he should concentrate on his club career. During a match against Bordeaux on 12 December 2010, he suffered an ankle injury in the second half from Salif Sané. He would undergo surgery which was a success but he suffered a series of complications with a hamstring injury. After taking time to completely heal, he returned to training at the end of July, ahead of the new season.

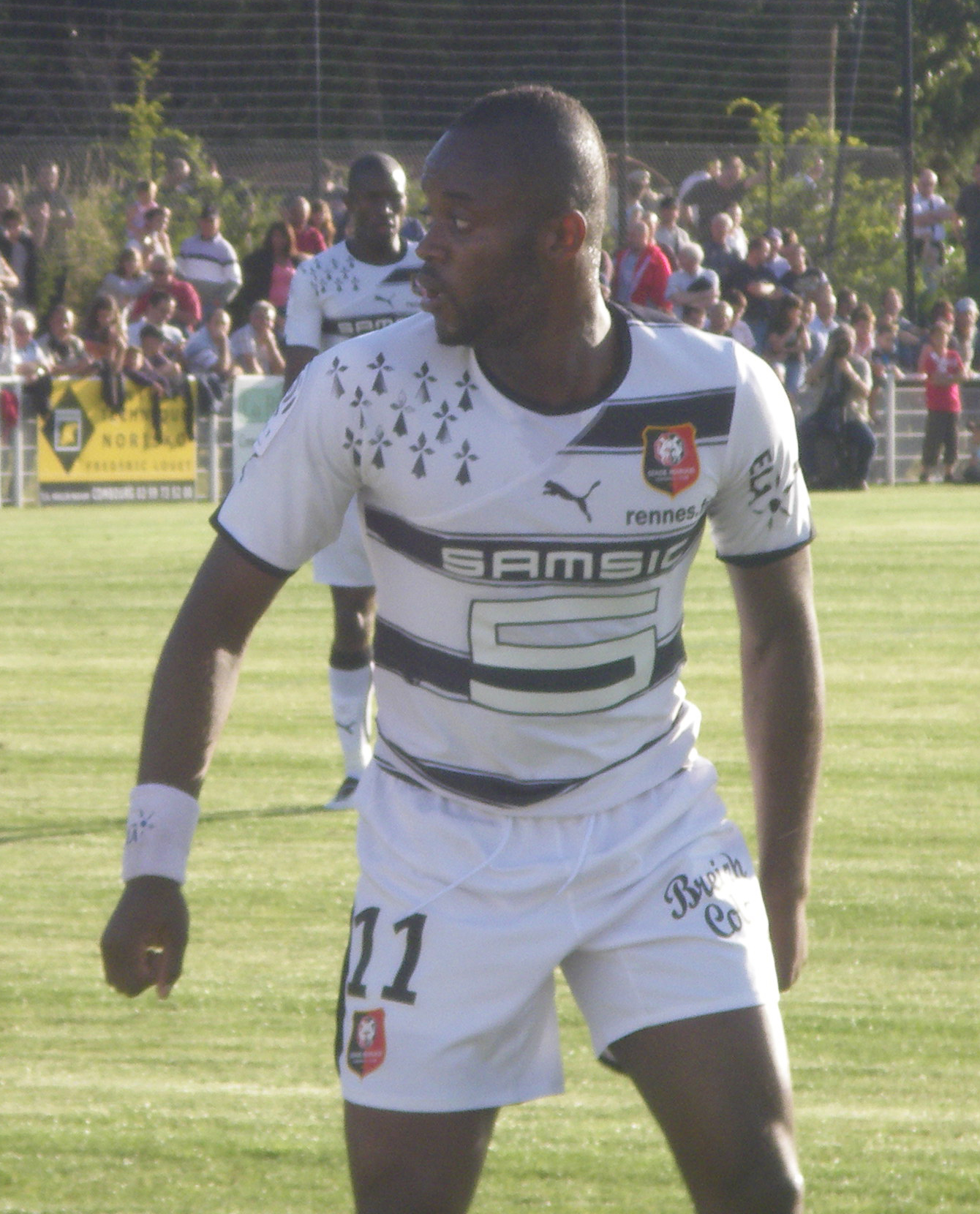
Kembo Ekoko in a match between Stade Rennais and Stade Brestois.

In his sixth season, Kembo Ekoko came on as a substitute for Razak Boukari and after ten minutes, he scored the only goal in the game against French giant Marseille. Since then, he maintained goalscoring form, making him one of the most effective strikers in Ligue 1, but would lose his form in the second half of the season, although in the final game of the season he scored twice in a 5–0 win over Dijon. That win relegated Dijon after one season. In the qualifying round of the Europa League, he scored his first Europa League goal and set up in a 4–0 win over Red Star Belgrade. That win earned the club advancement to the group stage. He scored 13 goals (including all league and cups), the best total of his career since turning professional. In the summer, Kembo Ekoko was in negotiations to sign a new contract, as his contract would expire the following month. By early August, Antonetti announced Kembo Ekoko was close to sign a new deal. After Kembo Ekoko left Rennes for Al Ain, Antonetti said he was disappointed by his departure.

=== Al Ain ===
After one appearance for Rennes against Lyon, he joined Al Ain FC on a four-year deal.

== International career ==
Kembo Ekoko was eligible to play for DR Congo or France, since he acquired French nationality by naturalization on 21 April 2008, and was called up for the French national U21 squad.

== Career statistics ==
Appearances and goals by club, season and competition
Club	Season	League			Cup		League Cup		Continental		Other		Total	
Club	Season	Division	Apps	Goals	Apps	Goals	Apps	Goals	Apps	Goals	Apps	Goals	Apps	Goals
Rennes	2006–07	Ligue 1	3	0	0	0	1	0	—		—		4	0
Rennes	2007–08	Ligue 1	7	0	0	0	1	0	3	0	—		11	0
Rennes	2008–09	Ligue 1	20	2	4	1	2	1	2	0	—		28	4
Rennes	2009–10	Ligue 1	24	1	3	0	2	0	—		—		29	1
Rennes	2010–11	Ligue 1	23	3	2	0	1	1	—		—		26	4
Rennes	2011–12	Ligue 1	32	10	5	2	0	0	5	1	—		42	13
Rennes	2012–13	Ligue 1	1	0	—		—		—		—		1	0
Rennes	Total		110	16	14	3	7	2	10	1	—		141	22
Al Ain	2012–13	UAE Pro League	23	8	3	2	4	2	6	1	1	0	37	13
Al Ain	2014–15	UAE Pro League	21	11	2	0	3	1	11	3	1	0	38	15
Al Ain	Total		44	19	5	2	7	3	17	4	2	0	75	28
El Jaish (loan)	2013–14	Qatar Stars League	22	6	0	0	—		7	0	—		29	6
Al Nasr	2015–16	UAE Pro League	22	9	1	1	5	1	8	1	—		35	13
Al Nasr	2016–17	UAE Pro League	24	2	4	0	5	0	1	0	—		35	3
Al Nasr	Total		46	11	5	1	10	1	9	1	—		70	15
Bursaspor	2017–18	Süper Lig	24	4	1	0	—		—		—		25	4
Bursaspor	2018–19	Süper Lig	2	0	0	0	—		—		—		2	0
Bursaspor	Total		26	4	1	0	—		—		—		27	4
Career total			248	56	25	6	24	6	43	6	2	0	342	74

== Honours ==
Al Ain

- UAE Pro League: 2012–13, 2014–15
- UAE Super Cup: 2013

El Jaish

- Qatar Cup: 2014
