= Samuel Mbappé Léppé =

Cameroonian association football player (1936–1985)

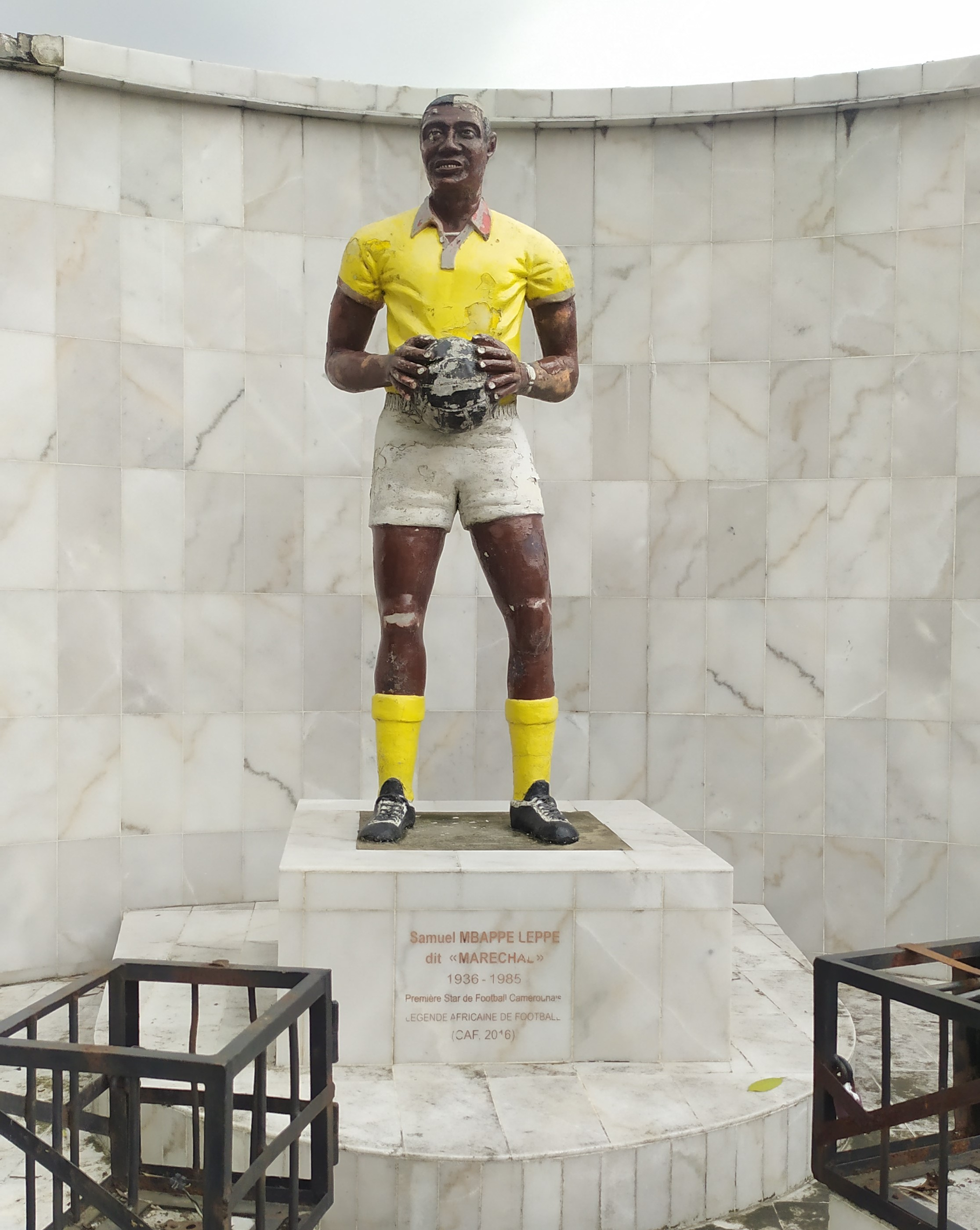
- Statue of Samuel Mbappé Léppé at the entrance of the Stade Mbappé Léppé

Personal information
- Full name: Samuel Mbappé Léppé
- Date of birth: 28 February 1936
- Place of birth: Douala, Cameroon
- Date of death: 25 December 1985 (aged 49)
- Place of death: Douala, Cameroon
- Position: Midfielder

Senior career*
Years	Team	Apps	(Gls)
1956–1972	Oryx Douala		

International career
1960-1967	Cameroon	7	(9)
- * Club domestic league appearances and goals

Samuel Mbappé Léppé (28 February 1936 – 25 December 1985), also known as Mbappé Moumi Samuel, nicknamed Maréchal was a Cameroonian professional footballer who played as a midfielder. He comes from the Sawa community.

== Biography ==
=== Childhood ===
Mbappé Léppé was born on 28 February 1936 in Douala. He was the son of Moumè Mbappé and de Rose Ebelle.

=== Career ===
He played for Oryx Douala in the 1950s and 1960s, winning five Cameroon championship titles (1961, 1963, 1964, 1965 and 1967), three times the Cameroon Cup (1963, 1968 and 1970) and he was the first captain to lift the African Cup of Champions Clubs, doing so in the 1964–65 season. Roger Milla describes him as being the greatest. Over the course of his career, he earned several transfer deals especially from European clubs. These European clubs offered him a chance to play professional football in Europe but he refused to join them.

Nicknamed the "Marshal". he also served as the captain of the Cameroon football team at a point in his career.

He was part of the Cameroonian squad who were selected to play in the 1970 African Cup of Nations, however The Cameroon National Football Team were unfortunately eliminated in the group stage. His brother Ebèllé Moumi Walter was also a footballer. The "Moumi" brothers both played careers with Oryx Douala and the Cameroon national team.

== Death ==
Mbappé Léppé died on 25 December 1985 due to complications at age 49, in Douala, Cameroon. He was buried in the Cimitière de Banguè.

== Legacy ==
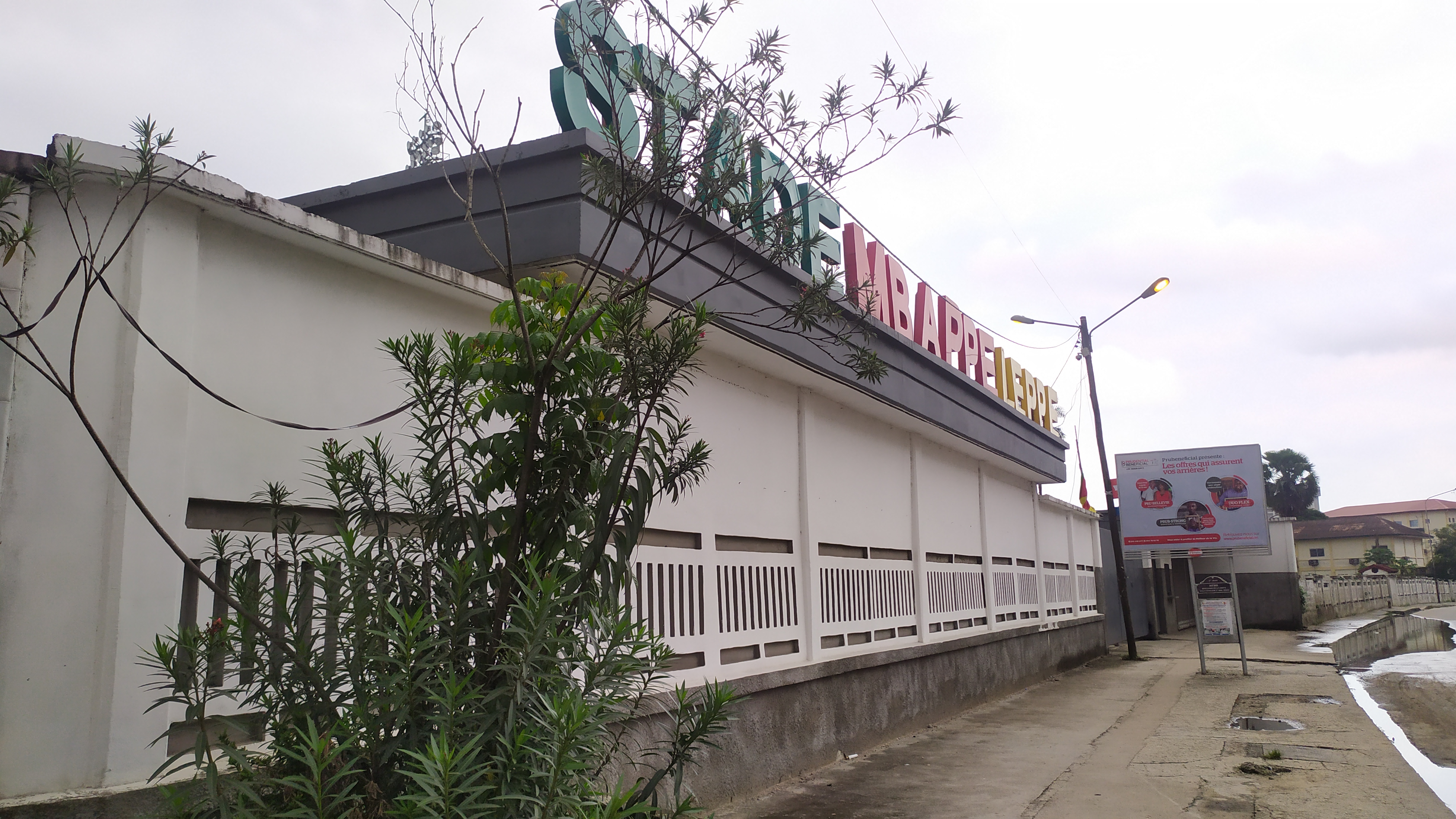
Entrance of Stade Mbappé Léppé

In 1982, the Cameroonian government issued a 125 F stamp bearing the image of Mbappé in honour of him.

The Akwa Stadium was renamed after him as the Stade Mbappé Léppé. He was posthumously awarded the African Legend trophy by the Confederation of African Football in 2015 during the 2015 CAF Awards.

== Honours ==
Oryx Douala

- Cameroon championship: 1961, 1963, 1964, 1965, 1967
- Cameroon Cup: 1963, 1968, 1970
- African Cup of Champions Clubs: 1964–65

Individual

- African Legend: 2015
