= Ethan Mbappé =

French footballer (born 2006)

Personal information
- Full name: Ethan Mbappé Lottin
- Date of birth: 29 December 2006 (age 19)
- Place of birth: Montreuil, Seine-Saint-Denis, France
- Height: 1.80 m (5 ft 11 in)
- Positions: Right winger; midfielder

Team information
- Current team: Lille
- Number: 8

Youth career
- 2015–2017: Bondy
- 2017–2024: Paris Saint-Germain

Senior career*
Years	Team	Apps	(Gls)
2023–2024	Paris Saint-Germain	3	(0)
2024–	Lille	35	(5)
- * Club domestic league appearances and goals as of 23:03, 30 October 2026 (UTC)

Ethan Mbappé Lottin (born 29 December 2006) is a French professional footballer who plays as a right winger or midfielder for Ligue 1 club Lille.

== Early life ==
Born in Montreuil, Seine-Saint-Denis, Mbappé was raised in a footballing family, with brother Kylian and adopted brother Jirès Kembo Ekoko both having professional football careers. Their father Wilfrid Mbappé is Cameroonian soccer coach and their mother Fayza Lamari is a French handball player of Algerian origin.

== Club career ==
=== Early career ===
Mbappé followed in both of his older brothers' footsteps by joining local side Bondy in 2015. After two years with Bondy, he joined French club Paris Saint-Germain (PSG) in 2017, in the same transfer window that saw the club bring in his brother Kylian on loan. He scored on his debut for the under-12 team.

=== Paris Saint-Germain ===
Mbappé signed a new three-year youth contract with PSG in June 2021. On 16 December 2022, at the age of 15, he made his debut with the club's senior team in a 2–1 friendly win over Paris FC. Ahead of the 2023–24 season, he was called up for the pre-season tour in Asia, and made his first start for PSG in a 3–0 friendly win over Jeonbuk Hyundai Motors on 3 August. Mbappé was selected for a PSG competitive match-day squad for the first time on 15 September 2023, remaining as an unused substitute in a 3–2 home defeat to Nice. He made his senior and professional debut with PSG as a substitute in a 3–1 Ligue 1 win over Metz on 20 December 2023. Mbappé announced his departure from PSG on 18 June 2024. His brother Kylian, who also left the club that summer, suggested that he would have stayed if Ethan had remained at the club.

=== Lille ===
Mbappé signed for fellow Ligue 1 club Lille on 4 July 2024, on a three-year contract running until 2027. He chose to wear shirt number 29 and stated, "At my age, staying in France was the best option to grow. I think Lille was the best project. It's one of the best clubs in France." Following the transfer, his elder brother Kylian posted on social media, commending him for his first professional contract. Mbappé is one of several players who joined Lille after graduating from the PSG academy, including Mike Maignan, Boubakary Soumaré, Jonathan Ikoné and Timothy Weah.

Mbappé made his debut for his new club on 17 August, coming off the bench in a 2–0 Ligue 1 away win over Reims and providing an assist to Jonathan David. He then made his first Ligue 1 start in a 2–0 home win against Angers the next week, at the age of 17 years 7 months and 26 days. Four days later, Mbappé played his first UEFA Champions League match at Slavia Prague in the play-off round, taking part in his club's qualification to the brand new league phase. In September 2024, Mbappé suffered an injury, missing games including a match against brother Kylian's Real Madrid. His first season was marred by injury.

On 4 March 2025, he made his first start in six months and his first Champions League start in a 1–1 draw away to Borussia Dortmund in the round of 16. Later that year, on 14 September, he scored his first Ligue 1 goal, a 98th minute winner in a 2–1 win over Toulouse.

== International career ==
In November 2021, Mbappé was called up to the France under-16s. On 18 September 2026, he received his first call-up to the France under-21s.

== Style of play ==
Ethan is a technical, left-footed midfielder. He has been praised for his mentality, football intelligence, calmness on the ball, and passing ability.

== Career statistics ==
As of match played 30 October 2026

Appearances and goals by club, season, and competition
Club	Season	League			Coupe de France		Europe		Other		Total	
Club	Season	Division	Apps	Goals	Apps	Goals	Apps	Goals	Apps	Goals	Apps	Goals
Paris Saint-Germain	2023–24	Ligue 1	3	0	2	0	0	0	0	0	5	0
Lille	2024–25	Ligue 1	10	0	1	0	3 (Note: Appearances in UEFA Champions League)	0	—		14	0
Lille	2025–26	Ligue 1	18	3	2	0	2 (Note: Appearances in UEFA Europa League)	0	—		22	3
Lille	2026–27	Ligue 1	7	2	0	0	1	0	—		8	2
Lille	Total		35	5	3	0	6	0	0	0	44	5
Career total			38	5	5	0	6	0	0	0	49	5

== Honours ==
Paris Saint-Germain U19

- Championnat National U19: 2023–24

Paris Saint-Germain

- Ligue 1: 2023–24
- Coupe de France: 2023–24
