= AS Bondy =

Football club in Bondy, Paris, France

- Full name: Association Sportive de Bondy
- Website: www.asbondy.com

Association Sportive de Bondy, also known as AS Bondy, is a football club based in Bondy, France.

Notable former members of the club include Kylian Mbappé, William Saliba, Jonathan Ikoné and Ethan Mbappé.

After years of coaching at the club, Wilfrid Mbappé stepped down to dedicate himself to his sons' careers.

== Notable players ==
- (France) Jaydee Canvot (youth)
- (France) Sébastien Corchia (youth)
- (France) Jonathan Ikoné (youth)
- (France) Ethan Mbappé (youth)
- (France) Kylian Mbappé (youth)
- (Democratic Republic of the Congo) Fabrice Nsakala (youth)
- (France) William Saliba (youth)
