= Stade Mbappé Léppé =

Stadium in Douala, Cameroon

Coordinates: 4°02′40.65″N 9°41′38.31″E

Stade Samuel Mbappé Léppé formally Stade Akwa is a multi-use stadium in Douala, Cameroon. It is currently used mostly for football matches. It serves as a home ground of Kadji Sports Academy. The stadium holds 4,000 people. Its namesake is Samuel Mbappé Léppé.

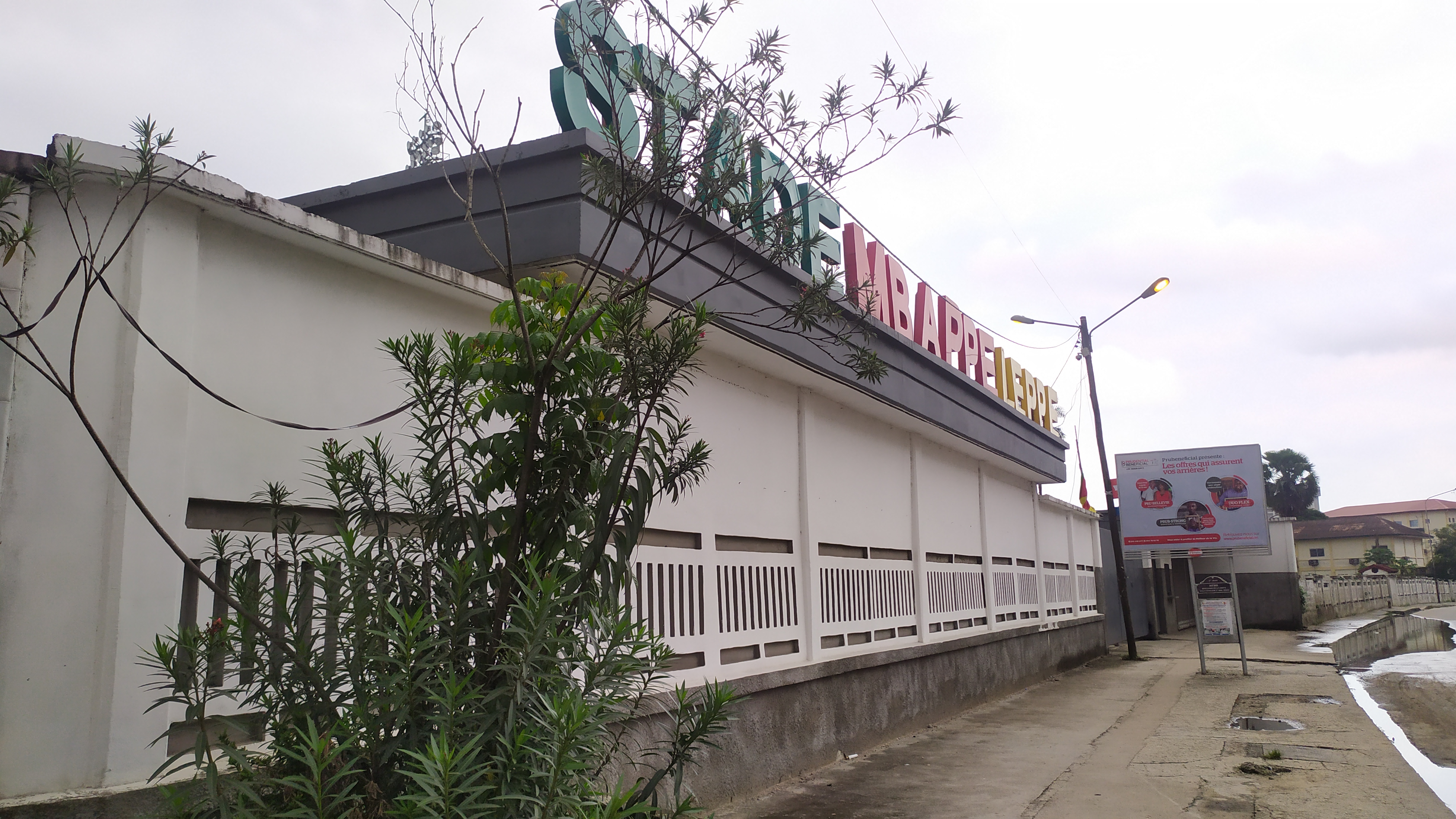
Mbappe Leppe Stadium external view
