= Kylian Mbappé =

French footballer (born 1998)

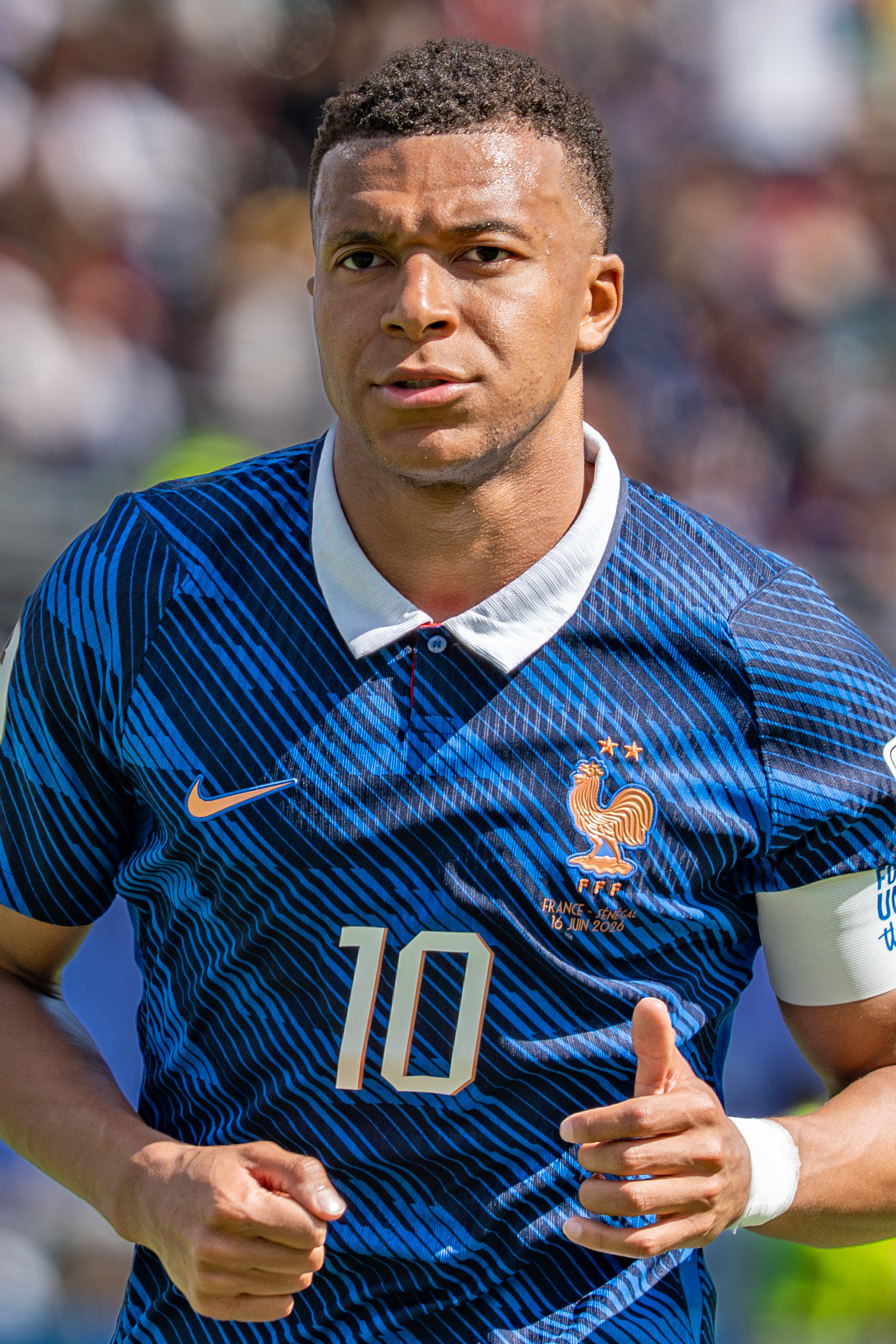
- Mbappé with France in 2026

Personal information
- Full name: Kylian Mbappé Lottin
- Date of birth: 20 December 1998 (age 27)
- Place of birth: Paris, France
- Height: 1.78 m (5 ft 10 in)
- Position: Forward

Team information
- Current team: Real Madrid
- Number: 10

Youth career
- 2004–2013: Bondy
- 2013–2015: Monaco

Senior career*
Years	Team	Apps	(Gls)
2015–2016	Monaco II	12	(4)
2015–2018	Monaco	41	(16)
2017–2018	→ Paris Saint-Germain (loan)	27	(13)
2018–2024	Paris Saint-Germain	178	(162)
2024–	Real Madrid	78	(69)

International career^{‡}
2014	France U17	2	(0)
2016	France U19	11	(7)
2017–	France	108	(67)
Medal record
Men's football
Representing France
FIFA World Cup
Winner	2018 Russia
Runner-up	2022 Qatar
UEFA Nations League
Winner	2021 Italy
Third place	2025 Germany
UEFA European Under-19 Championship
Winner	2016 Germany
- * Club domestic league appearances and goals as of 22:07, 21 November 2026 (UTC) ‡ National team caps and goals as of 22:22, 15 November 2026 (UTC)

Kylian Mbappé Lottin (Note: French pronunciation: [kiljan mbape lɔtɛ̃]) (born 20 December 1998) is a French professional footballer who plays as a forward for La Liga club Real Madrid and captains the France national team. Widely regarded as one of the best players of all time, he is known for his pace, dribbling, and finishing. (Note: Attributed to multiple references:) He has scored over 450 goals in his senior career, being the all-time top goalscorer for Paris Saint-Germain (256), the France national team (67), and the FIFA World Cup (22). (Note: Attributed to multiple references:)

Born in Paris and raised in Bondy, Mbappé began his senior career in 2015 with Monaco, where he won the 2016–17 Ligue 1 title, the club's first league title in 17 years. In 2017, at age 18, he signed for Paris Saint-Germain (PSG) on an eventual permanent transfer worth €180 million, making him the second-most-expensive player in the world. He won 15 trophies with PSG, including six Ligue 1 titles and four Coupes de France, and helped them reach the Champions League final in 2020. He also finished as the league's top goalscorer a record six times, and won Ligue 1 Player of the Year a record five times. In 2024, Mbappé joined Real Madrid on a free transfer. In his debut season, he scored in the UEFA Super Cup and FIFA Intercontinental Cup as Real Madrid won both titles. He won the European Golden Shoe in 2025. He was the top scorer in La Liga in 2025 and 2026, and in the Champions League in 2026.

Mbappé made his senior debut for France in 2017. At the 2018 FIFA World Cup, he became the second teenager, after Pelé, to score in a World Cup final and win the World Cup (aged 19 years and 207 days), being honoured as the World Cup Best Young Player and French Player of the Year. He helped France win the UEFA Nations League in 2021, ranking as top scorer in the finals. At the 2022 FIFA World Cup, Mbappé led France to a second consecutive final, in which he scored a hat-trick as France finished as runners-up. He set the record for most goals scored in World Cup finals (4), and won the tournament's Golden Boot and Silver Ball. At the 2026 FIFA World Cup, Mbappé won the Golden Boot as his 10 goals made him the third-highest scorer in a single World Cup, tied with Gerd Müller. Mbappé also became the first player to win multiple World Cup Golden Boots.

Mbappé has finished as runner-up for the 2022 Best FIFA Men's Player and the 2026 Ballon d'Or. He has been the UEFA Champions League top scorer twice and was awarded IFFHS World's Best Top Goal Scorer twice. He has been named in the FIFPRO World 11 seven times and the IFFHS Men's World Team five times. He was awarded the Golden Boy in 2017 and the Kopa Trophy in 2018. During the 2021–22 season, he became the first player to finish as both the Ligue 1 top scorer and the top assist provider. Mbappé was named one of Time's 100 most influential people in the world in 2023 and was listed by Forbes as one of the world's ten highest-paid athletes in 2023 and 2024.

== Early life ==
Kylian Mbappé Lottin was born on 20 December 1998 in the 19th arrondissement of Paris, and was raised in Bondy in the city's northeastern suburbs. His father, Wilfrid Mbappé, is a football coach who is originally from the Cameroonian island of Djébalè. His mother and agent, Fayza Lamari, is of Algerian Kabyle origin and is a former handball player. (Note: Attributed to multiple references:) Mbappé has a younger brother, Ethan, who plays professionally for Lille. Their older adopted brother, Jirès Kembo Ekoko, is a former professional footballer.

As a child, Mbappé went to a private Catholic school in Bondy, where he was considered academically gifted but unruly. At 15, he began taking Spanish lessons, and eventually became fluent in the language. As a youth, Mbappé's favourite team was Real Madrid, and he also supported AC Milan. His football idols included Zinedine Zidane, Cristiano Ronaldo, Neymar, Ronaldinho, Lionel Messi, Ronaldo Nazario, Eden Hazard and Thierry Henry. In May 2024, days before his transfer to Real Madrid was announced, Mbappé said that he still follows AC Milan, and would like to play for them in the future.

== Club career ==
=== Early career ===
When Mbappé started his career with AS Bondy at the age of six, he had several coaches, including his father. Eventually, Mbappé moved to the Clairefontaine football academy. His impressive performances led to numerous clubs attempting to sign him, including Real Madrid, Chelsea, Liverpool, Manchester City and Bayern Munich. At the age of 11, Real Madrid invited him to train with their under-12 teams. Mbappé was tracked by Caen for three years, but their relegation from Ligue 1 in 2012 and subsequent failure to win promotion meant they could not afford to sign him. At age 14, Mbappé travelled to London on an invitation from Chelsea, where he played a match for their youth team against Charlton Athletic.

=== Monaco ===
In July 2013, at the age of 14, Mbappé joined the youth academy of Monaco. The club managed to secure a three-year contract with him despite efforts by Real Madrid to sign him. (Note: Attributed to multiple references:)

==== 2015–2017: Breakthrough and league title ====
In October 2015, Mbappé was brought in by Leonardo Jardim to be a mainstay in Monaco's reserve team. However, his level of skill and maturity prompted his promotion to the main squad after three weeks. He made his first-team debut on 2 December, in a 1–1 draw against Caen in Ligue 1. The 16-year-old Mbappé became Monaco's youngest-ever first-team player, breaking the previous record set by Thierry Henry in 1994. On 20 February 2016, Mbappé scored his first goal for the first team, becoming the youngest first-team goalscorer in Monaco's history. On 6 March, he signed his first professional contract, which kept him with Monaco until June 2019. In an interview with CNN, Monaco's vice-president Vadim Vasilyev said he knew early on that Mbappé was a "phenomenon".

Mbappé scored the first hat-trick of his first-team career on 14 December 2016, in a 7–0 home win over Rennes in the Coupe de la Ligue round of 16. (Note: Attributed to multiple references:) The following February, Mbappé scored his first Ligue 1 hat-trick in a 5–0 win over Metz. On 5 March, he reached ten goals in Ligue 1, becoming the youngest player in thirty years to reach the mark.

In the quarter-finals of the Champions League in 2017 against Borussia Dortmund, Mbappé scored two goals as Monaco won the first leg 3–2. In the second leg, he opened the scoring as Monaco won 3–1 and advanced to the semi-finals. They were eventually eliminated following a 4–1 loss to Juventus. Mbappé ended the 2016–17 season with 26 goals from 44 matches in all competitions, as Monaco won the Ligue 1 title. He credited fellow Monaco striker Radamel Falcao as a key influence on him throughout the season, giving him the space to express himself and teaching him to be "calm" and "serene" during the game.

=== Paris Saint-Germain ===
On 31 August 2017, Paris Saint-Germain (PSG) announced the signing of Mbappé from Monaco on loan with a mandatory purchase option of €180 million. According to PSG's assistant sporting director Luis Ferrer, Mbappé's decision to join the club was partly due to a convincing speech given by manager Unai Emery at the Mbappés' home over the summer. (Note: Attributed to multiple references:) The €180 million fee made Mbappé the most expensive teenager ever and the second-most-expensive player ever (behind his teammate Neymar), and broke the record for the largest transfer within a domestic league. (Note: Attributed to multiple references:) He was given the number 29 shirt upon arrival in Paris.

==== 2017–2021: Ligue 1 Player of the Year award and UEFA Champions League finalist ====
On 8 September 2017, Mbappé made his PSG debut, scoring a goal in a 5–1 Ligue 1 win over Metz. During a 3–0 victory over Bayern Munich in the group stage of the Champions League, he set up goals for Edinson Cavani and Neymar. On 6 December, the 18-year-old Mbappé scored his tenth career Champions League goal in a 3–1 loss to Bayern, becoming the youngest player to reach that mark. In July 2018, Mbappé was given the number 7 shirt for the upcoming season with PSG.

In his first appearance of the season, Mbappé scored twice in the last 10 minutes as PSG won 3–1 against Guingamp in Ligue 1. On 1 September, he scored and assisted in a 4–2 win over Nîmes, but was sent off for the first time in his career following an altercation with Téji Savanier. The following month, Mbappé scored four goals within 13 minutes in a 5–0 victory over Lyon. In December, he was the inaugural winner of the Kopa Trophy, which is awarded by France Football to the best under-21 player in the world. On 19 January 2019, Mbappé scored a hat-trick in a 9–0 win over Guingamp. On 2 March, he scored twice in a 2–1 win over Caen to reach his 50th goal with the club. PSG finished the season as Ligue 1 champions, with Mbappé winning the Player of the Year award and finishing the season as the top goalscorer with 33 goals.

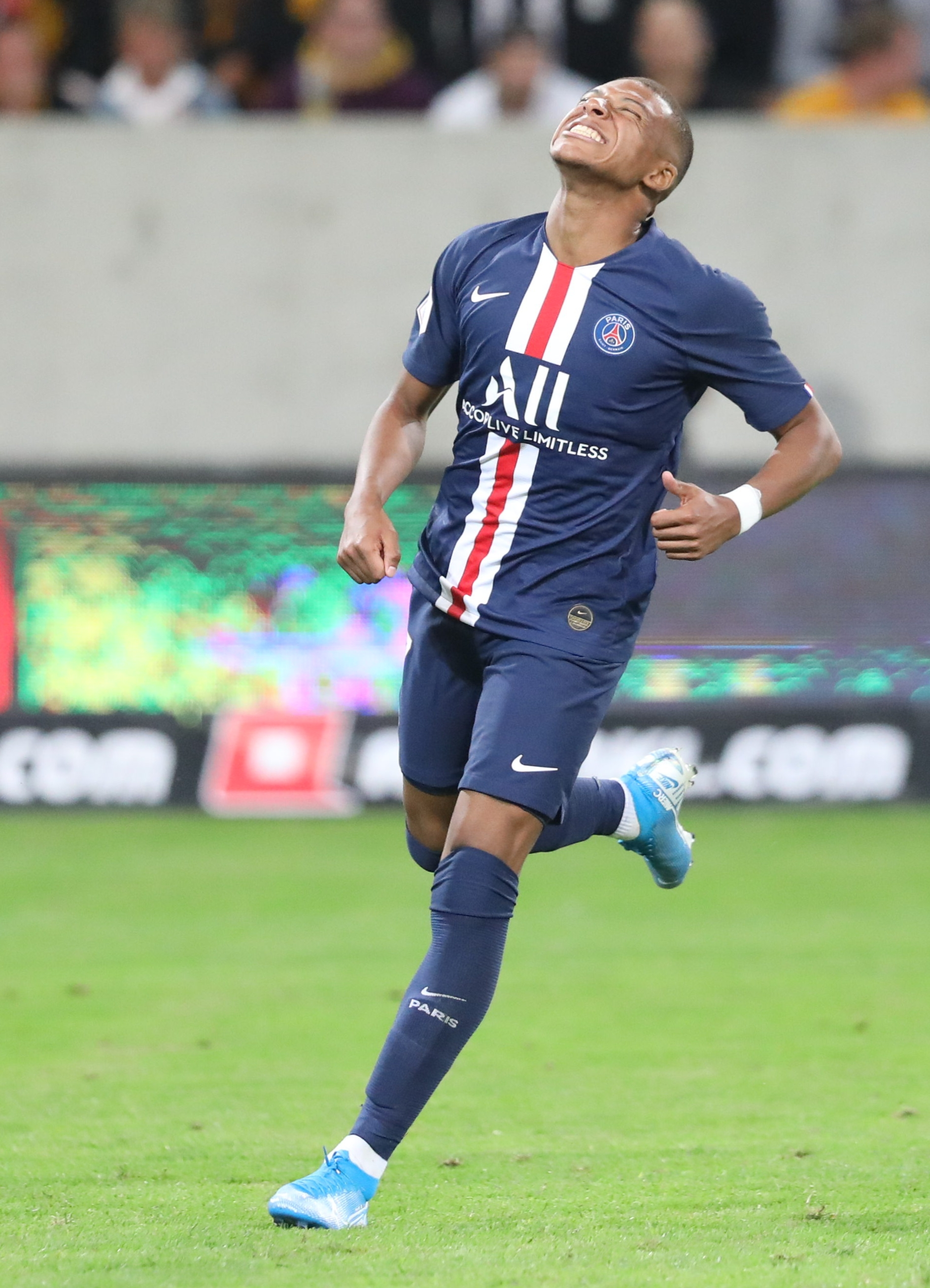
Mbappé playing for Paris Saint-Germain in a pre-season friendly against Dynamo Dresden in July 2019

On 3 August 2019, Mbappé scored in a 2–1 win over Rennes to capture his first title of the 2019–20 season, the Trophée des Champions. On 22 October, he scored a perfect hat-trick in a 5–0 victory over Club Brugge in the Champions League. On 1 May 2020, PSG were crowned Ligue 1 champions after the season was cut short during the COVID-19 pandemic. Mbappé finished the 2019–20 season as the joint-top scorer in Ligue 1 with 18 goals, along with Monaco's Wissam Ben Yedder; Mbappé was assigned the title due to his higher goals-per-game ratio. After an injury during the Coupe de France final, Mbappé was unable to play in the Coupe de la Ligue final, which PSG went on to win, completing a domestic treble. He returned to action in the Champions League quarter-final against Atalanta on 12 August, assisting a match-winning goal in injury time. PSG lost 1–0 to Bayern Munich in the Champions League final on 23 August.

Mbappé missed the first three matches of the season after contracting COVID-19. He returned on 20 September 2020, scoring a goal in a 3–0 win against Nice. In a Ligue 1 match against Montpellier on 5 December, Mbappé became the fifth player to score 100 goals for PSG. During the Champions League group stage, Mbappé scored two goals in a 5–1 victory over İstanbul Başakşehir, qualifying PSG for the knockout phase. He became the youngest player in Champions League history to reach twenty goals, although his record was surpassed by Erling Haaland later in the season. On 16 February 2021, a Champions League hat-trick saw Mbappé become PSG's third-highest scorer. On 10 March, Mbappé's goal in a 1–1 draw against Barcelona saw him surpass Lionel Messi as the youngest player to reach 25 Champions League goals.

In the first leg of the Champions League quarter-final against Bayern Munich on 7 April, Mbappé scored two goals in PSG's 3–2 victory. PSG was eliminated in the semi-finals. On 19 May, Mbappé had one goal and one assist as PSG won the Coupe de France final against Monaco, claiming their first major trophy of the season. He ended the Ligue 1 campaign with 27 goals, becoming the top scorer for the third consecutive season. He also received the Ligue 1 Player of the Year award and was included in the Ligue 1 Team of the Season.

==== 2021–2023: Contract extension and PSG all-time top goalscorer ====
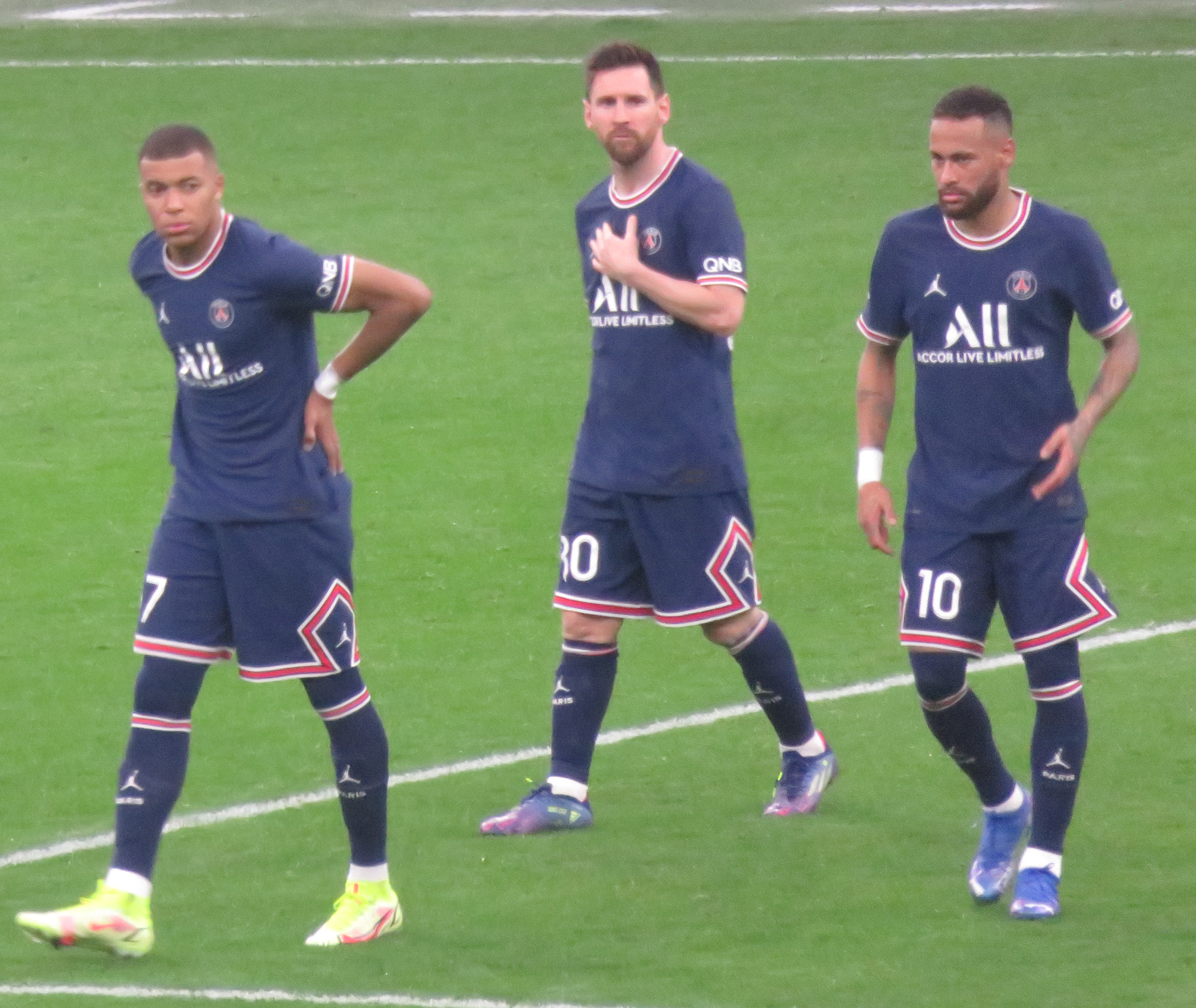
Left to right: Mbappé, Lionel Messi and Neymar playing for Paris Saint-Germain in 2021

On 14 August 2021, prior to PSG's opening home match of the 2021–22 season against Strasbourg, Mbappé was booed by spectators amidst rumours that he wanted to sign for the La Liga club Real Madrid. Mbappé scored his first goal of the season in a 4–2 win against Brest six days later. On 7 December, he scored two goals in a 4–1 Champions League win over Club Brugge, making him the youngest player in history to reach both 30 and 31 goals in the Champions League. On 12 December, the 22-year-old Mbappé scored twice against Monaco in Ligue 1, becoming the youngest player to score 100 goals for a single top-level French team since Opta began recording data during the 1950–51 season. During the Champions League round of 16, Mbappé became the second-highest goalscorer in PSG history. (Note: Attributed to multiple references:)

Despite speculations of a possible transfer to Real Madrid, Mbappé extended his contract with PSG until 2024, with a one-year optional extension. According to Sky Sports, Mbappé's contract included a monthly wage of £4 million, making him the highest-paid player in the world. He also reportedly received a signing-on figure in the region of £100 million. With 28 goals during the season, Mbappé finished as the top scorer for the fourth consecutive time. He also provided 17 assists in the season, making him the first player to finish as both top scorer and top assist provider in the league's history.

On 11 October 2022, Mbappé scored a penalty kick in a 1–1 Champions League draw against Benfica, becoming the leading goalscorer for PSG in European competitions with 31 goals. The match occurred in the midst of media reports that Mbappé wanted to leave PSG during the January transfer window, which he denied. On 23 January 2023, Mbappé became the first PSG player to score five goals in a match, including a ten-minute hat-trick, in a 7–0 victory over Pays de Cassel in the Coupe de France round of 32. In early March, he scored his 201st goal for PSG in a 4–2 win over Nantes, becoming the club's all-time leading scorer. He ended the Ligue 1 campaign with 29 goals, becoming the top scorer for the fifth consecutive season as PSG won their record 11th Ligue 1 title. He received the Ligue 1 Player of the Year award for the fourth consecutive season and was named in the Ligue 1 Team of the Season.

==== 2023–2024: Final season ====
On 13 June 2023, via an official statement released through Agence France-Presse, Mbappé announced his decision not to renew his contract with PSG, which was set to expire in June 2024. According to him, the club had been informed about his decision since July 2022. In response to an article published by Le Parisien about his reported desire to join Real Madrid in the upcoming summer window, Mbappé tweeted that the rumours were "lies", and reaffirmed his intention to continue at PSG. However, during the unveiling of new manager Luis Enrique on 5 July, PSG president Nasser Al-Khelaifi stated that if Mbappé wanted to stay, he would have to "sign a new contract". Mbappé was subsequently excluded from PSG's preseason tour in Japan. (Note: Attributed to multiple references:) After much speculation surrounding his future at PSG, a statement from the club on 13 August confirmed his reintegration into the first team.

On 26 August, Mbappé scored his 150th Ligue 1 goal for PSG in a 3–1 win over Lens. On 11 November, he scored his first hat-trick of the season in a 3–0 win over Reims, lifting PSG to the top of the Ligue 1 standings. On 3 January 2024, Mbappé scored the second goal in a 2–0 victory over Toulouse in the 2023 Trophée des Champions, securing his first trophy of the season. In the process, he became the all-time top goalscorer at the Parc des Princes, with 111 goals. Four days later, Mbappé scored a hat-trick in a 9–0 win over Revel in the round of 64 of the Coupe de France, becoming the club's all-time top scorer in the competition by bringing his goal tally to 30.

Mbappé scored his second hat-trick of the season on 19 March in a 6–2 win over Montpellier, bringing him to 250 goals in all competitions for PSG. On 10 May, he announced on social media that he would not renew his contract, and would depart PSG at the end of the season. In his final match with the club on 25 May, he secured a trophy as PSG defeated Lyon in the Coupe de France final. He concluded his final season with PSG as the Champions League joint top scorer with 8 goals, tied with Harry Kane.

=== Real Madrid ===
On 3 June 2024, La Liga club Real Madrid announced that Mbappé had signed a five-year contract with the club, concluding a highly anticipated seven-year transfer saga. His move to Madrid had been the subject of intense speculation and negotiations, reflecting his status as one of football's most sought-after players. After signing he stated: "It's a dream come true. So happy and proud to join the club of my dreams." On 16 July, Mbappé was unveiled as a Real Madrid player at the Santiago Bernabéu, wearing the number 9 shirt. His presentation was attended by 80,000 spectators. (Note: Attributed to multiple references:)

==== 2024–2025: Debut season goalscoring records and European Golden Shoe ====
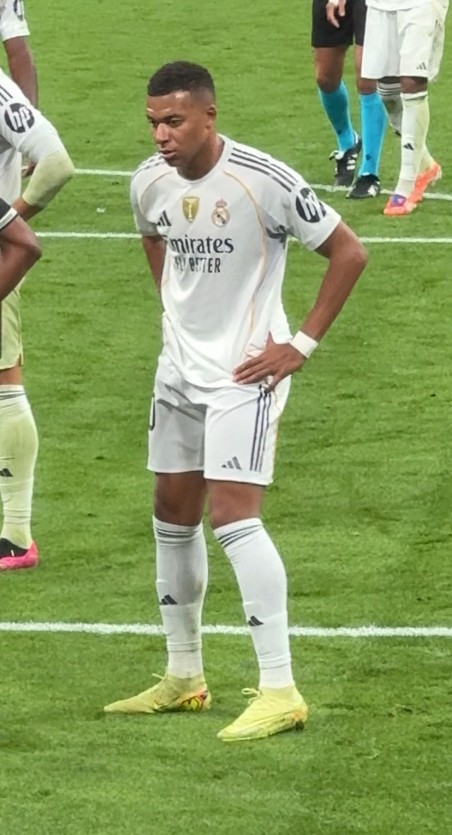
Mbappé playing for Real Madrid in 2025

Mbappé made his debut for Real Madrid on 14 August 2024 in the 2024 UEFA Super Cup against Atalanta, scoring the second goal of a 2–0 win. He debuted in La Liga on 18 August, during a 1–1 draw against Mallorca. On 1 September, he scored his first two La Liga goals in Madrid's 2–0 victory over Real Betis. Later in the month, he scored his first Champions League goal for the club during their 3–1 victory over VfB Stuttgart on the inaugural matchday of the newly formatted Champions League league phase. On 10 December, Mbappé scored his 50th Champions League goal in a 3–2 victory against Atalanta, becoming the second-youngest player to reach the mark after Lionel Messi.

On 25 January 2025, Mbappé scored his first hat-trick for Madrid in a 3–0 victory over league opponents Real Valladolid. With five league goals in January, he was named La Liga Player of the Month. On 19 February, he recorded his first hat-trick for Madrid in the Champions League in a 3–1 win over Manchester City, securing the team's progression to the Champions League round of 16. On 13 April, he received his first red card with Madrid after making a controversial tackle on Antonio Blanco, which he was widely scrutinised for. On 11 May, Mbappé's hat-trick in an El Clásico loss to Barcelona brought him to 39 goals for Madrid, breaking Iván Zamorano's record for most goals scored by a Real Madrid player in their debut season. In his next game, Mbappé scored his 28th league goal of the season, setting a record for most goals for Real Madrid in a debut season in La Liga. Mbappé finished his La Liga campaign with 31 goals in 34 games, winning the Pichichi Trophy and the European Golden Shoe for the first time in his career. On 28 May, he was named Madrid's Player of the Season.

==== 2025–2026: La Liga and Champions League top scorer ====
For the 2025–26 season, Mbappé switched to the number 10 shirt, which became available after the departure of midfielder Luka Modrić. On 16 September, he scored his 49th and 50th goals for Madrid against Marseille in a 2–1 Champions League win, becoming the fastest player to achieve this feat for Madrid since Cristiano Ronaldo. Late in November, Mbappé scored four goals in a 4–3 win over Olympiacos, including the second-fastest hat-trick in Champions League history, completed in six minutes and 42 seconds. On 20 December, he scored in a 2–0 victory over Sevilla, equalling Cristiano Ronaldo's record of 59 goals in a calendar year for Madrid. He concluded the season by securing his second Pichichi Trophy with 25 La Liga goals, while also finishing as the top scorer in the UEFA Champions League with 15 goals.

==== 2026–2027: 100 club goals ====
On 27 August 2026, Mbappé scored his sixth hat-trick for Real Madrid during a 4–1 victory over Real Sociedad. On 8 September, he scored against Inter Milan in a 2–1 win, equalling former Madrid striker Raúl as the fifth top scorer in Champions League history, with 71 career goals. Leading up to a match between Madrid and Elche on 15 September, the two clubs agreed that their players would wear shirts bearing a message of support for the inhabitants of Ceuta, a North African autonomous city controlled by Spain. In July 2026, more than 70,000 migrants illegally entered the city from neighboring Morocco, leading to a humanitarian crisis. Mbappé and his teammates Vinícius Júnior and Ibrahima Konaté wore the shirts partially rolled up, obscuring part of the message, and removed them before the pre-match handshake. After facing criticism in the Spanish press and on social media, Mbappé explained that he wore the shirt rolled up because he wanted to express solidarity not only with Ceuta but also with migrants who had died or were living in difficult conditions. (Note: Attributed to multiple references:) 14 October, Mbappé made his 100th Champions League appearance, scoring in a 4–3 away victory over Roma. On 25 October, he scored his 100th goal for the club, netting a brace in a 2–1 El Clásico away win over Barcelona. On 4 November, he became the second-youngest player to reach 100 Champions League goal contributions after scoring in a 3–2 away win against AEK Athens, recording 74 goals and 26 assists in 102 appearances, behind only Lionel Messi.

== International career ==
=== 2014–2018: Youth level and senior debut ===
In July 2016, Mbappé scored five times for France as they won the 2016 UEFA European Under-19 Championship. His two goals in a 3–1 victory over Portugal in the semi-finals had helped his team reach the final. He was included in the competition's Team of the Tournament. Mbappé received his first call-up to the French senior squad to face Luxembourg on 25 March 2017. On 31 August, Mbappé scored his first senior international goal in a 2018 World Cup qualification match against the Netherlands.

=== 2018–2021: FIFA World Cup triumph ===
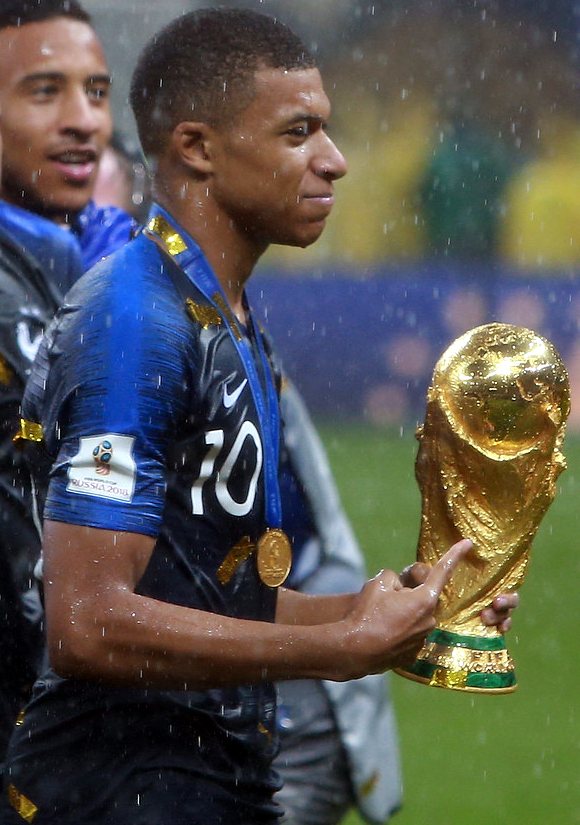
Mbappé holding the FIFA World Cup Trophy after France won the 2018 World Cup final

Mbappé was called up to the France squad for the 2018 World Cup in Russia. On 21 June, the 19-year-old Mbappé scored his first World Cup goal in a 1–0 group stage win over Peru, which made him the youngest French goalscorer in World Cup history. On 30 June, he scored two goals and was named man of the match in a 4–3 win over Argentina in the round of 16. Mbappé was the second teenager to score two goals in a World Cup match after Pelé in 1958. In a post-match press conference, he stated: "It's flattering to be the second one after Pelé but let's put things into context – Pelé is in another category." On 15 July, Mbappé scored a goal in the World Cup final as France defeated Croatia 4–2. He became the second teenager, after Pelé, to score in a World Cup final. Having scored four goals in the tournament, he received the FIFA World Cup Best Young Player Award. Pelé congratulated him on social media.

On 11 June 2019, Mbappé scored his 100th career goal in a 4–0 win over Andorra in a qualifier for UEFA Euro 2020. However, the tournament was postponed for a year due to the COVID-19 pandemic. In September 2020, Mbappé tested positive for COVID-19, which sidelined him for a month. (Note: Attributed to multiple references:) On 18 May 2021, he was included in France's squad for Euro 2020, his second major international tournament. France made it to the Euro 2020 round of 16, where a 3–3 draw against Switzerland went to a penalty shoot-out; Mbappé failed to score the decisive fifth penalty kick, and France was eliminated from the tournament.

=== 2021–2023: Nations League title and second consecutive World Cup final ===
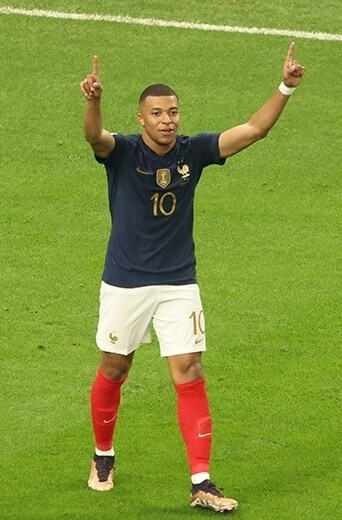
Mbappé playing for France at the 2022 FIFA World Cup

In the UEFA Nations League semi-final on 7 October 2021, Mbappé contributed a goal and an assist as France defeated Belgium 3–2. It was his 50th appearance for the French national team. Three days later, in the final against Spain, Mbappé scored the winning goal to give France a 2–1 victory and their first Nations League title. With two goals and two assists in the Nations League Finals, Mbappé was awarded the competition's Golden Boot, known as the "Alipay Top Scorer Trophy."

On 13 November 2021, Mbappé scored four times in an 8–0 win over Kazakhstan during the 2022 World Cup qualifiers. It was his first hat-trick in an international match, as well as the first competitive hat-trick for France since 1985. During the group stage of the 2022 FIFA World Cup in Qatar, Mbappé scored both of France's goals in a 2–1 victory over Denmark, securing entry to the knockout stages and breaking the "World Cup Champions' Curse".

During the World Cup final on 18 December 2022, Mbappé became the second player in history to score a hat-trick in a World Cup final. Argentina had a 2–0 lead over France with just over ten minutes remaining, before Mbappé scored twice in two minutes. In extra time, Argentina took the lead again, before Mbappé scored a penalty kick to even the score at 3–3. The match went to a penalty shoot-out; Mbappé scored his penalty, but France lost the shoot-out.

Mbappé won the tournament's Golden Boot with eight goals, and became the sixth all-time top goalscorer in World Cup history with twelve goals across two World Cups, tied with Pelé. Having scored a goal in the 2018 final, Mbappé also became the top goalscorer in World Cup finals, with four goals. Mbappé won the Silver Ball as the second-best player of the tournament, and completed the most dribbles throughout the tournament (25).

=== 2023–2025: Captaincy and Euro 2024 semi-finals ===
On 21 March 2023, two months following the international retirement of Hugo Lloris, France manager Didier Deschamps named Mbappé the team's new captain ahead of their UEFA Euro 2024 qualifying campaign. In his first match as captain, Mbappé led France to a 4–0 victory over the Netherlands, scoring two goals and assisting another. On 19 June, Mbappé scored his 40th goal for France and became the youngest player to make 70 appearances for the team. On 13 October, he scored two goals in a 2–1 win over the Netherlands, securing qualification for UEFA Euro 2024. On 18 November, he scored a hat-trick and provided three assists in a 14–0 victory over Gibraltar, France's largest-ever victory. His three goals brought him to 300 total career goals and 46 goals for France, making him France's third all-time top scorer.

In France's final group-stage match of Euro 2024, Mbappé scored his first-ever goal at the European Championships during a 1–1 draw against Poland, which allowed France to advance to the knockout stages. In the semi-finals, he set-up Randal Kolo Muani's opening goal in an eventual 2–1 defeat to Spain. Following France's elimination from the tournament, Mbappé described his performance as a "failure".

On 8 June 2025, Mbappé scored his 50th goal for France during a 2–0 victory over Germany in the 2025 UEFA Nations League Finals third place play-off. On 9 September, he became France's second all-time top goalscorer when he scored his 52nd international goal in a 2–1 victory over Iceland during a qualifying match for the 2026 FIFA World Cup. (Note: Attributed to multiple references:) On 13 November, Mbappé scored twice in a 4–0 win against Ukraine, reaching 400 career goals and helping his country secure qualification for the World Cup. Mbappé is the youngest player to score 400 career goals since Pelé in 1964.

=== 2026–present: Third World Cup and France all-time top goalscorer ===
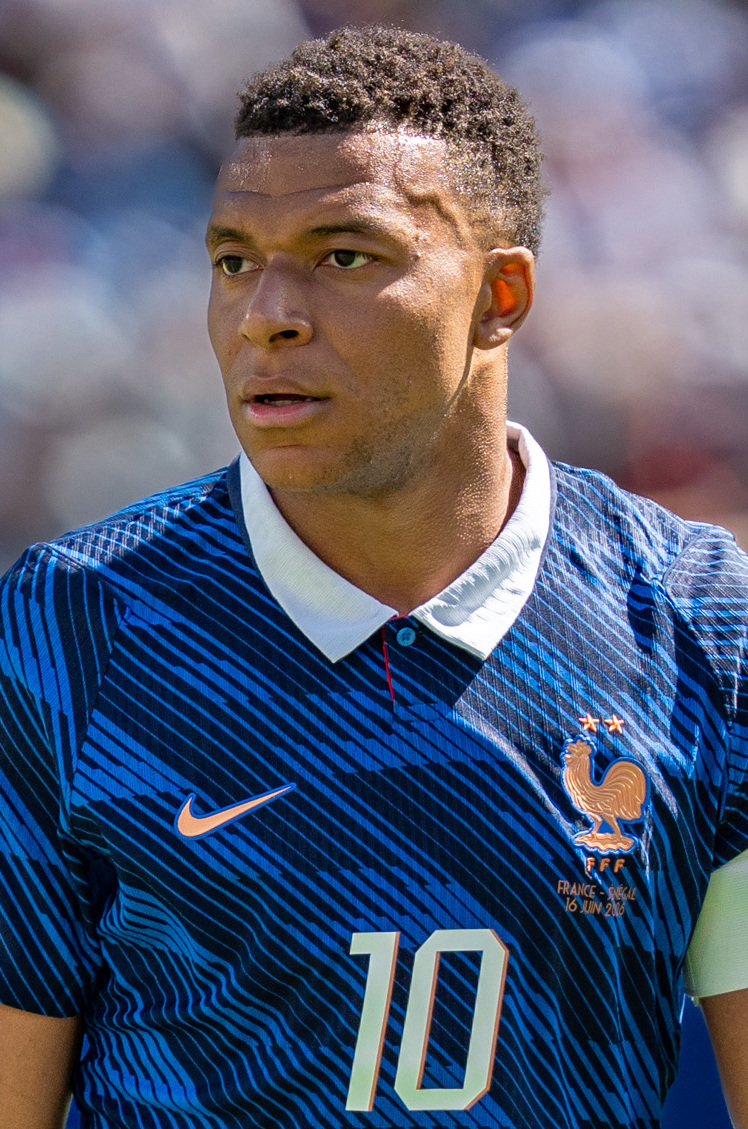
Mbappé with France at the 2026 FIFA World Cup

In France's opening match of the 2026 World Cup, Mbappé scored two goals in a 3–1 win over Senegal, surpassing Olivier Giroud to become France's all-time top scorer. With 14 World Cup goals, Mbappé surpassed Just Fontaine's record for the most career World Cup goals scored by a French player. On 22 June, Mbappé made his 100th international appearance for France, scoring two goals in a 3–0 win over Iraq. He became the first player to score two or more goals in six different World Cup matches. He then scored twice in a 3–0 victory against Sweden in the first knockout round, becoming the all-time leading goalscorer in World Cup knockout stages with ten goals, which broke the previous record held by Leônidas and Ronaldo. He also surpassed Miroslav Klose to become the second-highest all-time World Cup goalscorer, with 18 goals, behind Lionel Messi.

On 4 July, Mbappé scored from a penalty kick in a 1–0 win against Paraguay in the round of 16, which was his seventh goal of the tournament. After the match, Paraguayan senator Celeste Amarilla made comments about Mbappé on social media which were widely condemned as racist. Mbappé called Amarilla "despicable", and the French Football Federation announced that it would file a criminal complaint with the French Public Prosecutor's Office. French prosecutors subsequently opened an investigation into the alleged racist abuse.

In France's 2–0 quarter-final win over Morocco, Mbappé scored once and provided an assist for Ousmane Dembélé's goal, making him the first player to record ten goal contributions at each of two separate World Cups. France's 2–0 loss to Spain in the semi-final was Mbappé's 21st career World Cup match, which saw him surpass Hugo Lloris to become the France player with the most World Cup appearances. He scored two goals and provided an assist in a 6–4 loss to England in the third-place match, bringing his tallies to 10 goals in the tournament and 22 in his World Cup career, which saw him overtake Messi as the all-time World Cup top goalscorer. He was awarded the Golden Boot as the top scorer at the World Cup for the second consecutive time, becoming the first player to win the award twice, and won the Bronze Ball as the third-best player of the tournament. He also became the third-highest scorer in a single World Cup, behind Sándor Kocsis and Just Fontaine, while his 10 goals and four assists set a new record for the most goal contributions in a single World Cup since record-keeping began in 1966.

== Player profile ==
=== Style of play ===
A versatile forward, Mbappé often plays as a winger. He is capable of playing on either flank, due to his skill with both feet; he can cut into the centre onto his stronger right foot from the left wing, or create chances and provide assists for teammates from the right thanks to his vision. (Note: Attributed to multiple references:) He is also able to play in the centre as a main striker due to his composure, clinical finishing, and eye for goal. (Note: Attributed to multiple references:)

Mbappé is known for his dribbling ability, as well as his acceleration, agility, quick feet, first touch, and link-up play. He is also known for his creativity when in possession of the ball. He is known to make elaborate feints, such as step overs or sudden changes of pace or direction, to beat opponents in one-on-one situations. (Note: Attributed to multiple references:) He is also highly regarded for his pace and close ball control when dribbling at speed. This, along with his movement and tactical intelligence, allows him to beat the defensive line by making attacking runs into space both on and off the ball. His ability to time his runs enables him to stretch opposing defences, making him a dangerous offensive threat on counter-attacks. (Note: Attributed to multiple references:)

Since the early years of his career, Mbappé has been compared to great players in the history of football. Arsène Wenger said Mbappé had similar qualities to Thierry Henry. Mbappé's talent and performances for France at the 2018 World Cup led him to be compared to Pelé in the media. Former France international player Nicolas Anelka said that Mbappé's ability to run at defences reminded him of Ronaldo's performances at the 1996 Olympics.

=== Reception ===
Mbappé is widely regarded as one of the best players of his generation (Note: Attributed to multiple references:) and currently one of the best players in the world. Jean-Pierre Papin described him as the greatest striker in the history of the France national team. Writing for the official Olympics website in 2026, Courtney Hill said that Mbappé "comfortably slots into debates about France’s greatest-ever players." Following Mbappé's performance at the 2026 World Cup, former England player Peter Crouch described him as "potentially the greatest ever World Cup player", while The Athletic called him "unstoppable, a formidable blend of speed, strength and skill", who appeared to score "at will". The Dutch player Stefan de Vrij described Mbappé as his toughest opponent.

In 2018, Mbappé was considered the world's most expensive player from a transfer value perspective by the CIES. In 2020, he was named the fastest player in the world by the French newspaper Le Figaro. His performances at the club and international level saw him shortlisted for the Laureus World Sportsman of the Year award in 2019 and 2023. In 2023, Mbappé was included on the Time list of the 100 most influential people in the world.

== Sponsorships and wealth ==
Mbappé signed a sponsorship deal with Nike when he was 9 years old. In 2017, Nike began producing his signature football boots, the Kylian Mbappé Nike Hypervenom 3. In 2018, Mbappé unveiled the Nike Mercurial Superfly VI boots, which were inspired by the R9 Mercurial boots of former Brazilian striker Ronaldo. The same year, the Swiss watchmaker Hublot signed Mbappé as a brand ambassador. In 2021, Mbappé became a brand ambassador for Dior, a partnership that was initially announced for a two-year period but is still ongoing as of 2025. In 2022, Mbappé signed a multi-year sponsorship agreement with the sunglasses and sporting goods manufacturer Oakley. In 2026, he terminated his sponsorship deal with Nike and signed a deal with the sportswear company On.

In 2023, Mbappé was ranked third on the Forbes list of the world's highest-paid athletes. Forbes ranked him sixth on the list in 2024 and 16th in 2025. Sportico listed him as the fifth highest-paid athlete of 2023 and the ninth highest-paid athlete of 2024. (Note: Attributed to multiple references:)

== In popular culture ==
=== Depictions in art ===
Mbappé has been the subject of street art and wax sculpture. A large mural depicting him was painted in 2018 in his hometown of Bondy, and a second, Nike-commissioned mural by artist Akiko Stehrenberger from GlobalStreetArt was unveiled there in late 2019 to mark Mbappé's 21st birthday. Mbappé has been rendered as a wax figure at the Musée Grévin in Paris, and at Madame Tussauds Berlin and London. The London figure is displayed with items Mbappé donated, including his France jersey and his captain's armband.

=== Media and internet culture ===
In 2023, Mbappé was part of Netflix's docuseries Captains of the World, which followed national team captains during the 2022 FIFA World Cup. Ahead of the UEFA Euro 2024, BBC Sport produced the documentary Mbappé, tracing his rise from the Paris suburbs to World Cup glory. In 2021, he published the novel Je m'appelle Kylian with the French cartoonist Faro, which is aimed at young readers. In 2024, Mbappé and his production company Zebra Valley were reportedly working on a behind-the-scenes documentary featuring his transfer to Real Madrid.

Mbappé has generated sustained attention in internet meme culture. Early in his career, he was frequently depicted as a ninja turtle because of a perceived resemblance to the characters from Teenage Mutant Ninja Turtles. Particularly from 2026 onward, memes portraying him as a "dictator" emerged following rumours of his influence over decisions at both the club and national team levels.

=== Video games ===
Mbappé has been featured in EA Sports' FIFA and FC video game series. His trademark goal celebration – posing with his arms folded and hands tucked under his armpits – was inspired by his younger brother Ethan, who would celebrate in this manner when beating Kylian at FIFA video games. (Note: Attributed to multiple references:) Mbappé appeared on the cover of FIFA 21, FIFA 22, FIFA 23 and EA Sports FC 27.

== Personal life ==
In a 2018 interview with Time, Mbappé spoke about the sacrifices he made as a teenager to focus on his football development: "I did not have the moments of so-called normal people during adolescence, like going out with friends, enjoying good times." He said his life was "totally turned upside down" after he became famous. Just over four years after making his professional debut, Mbappé had over 50 million followers on Instagram, and by 2023 he had over 100 million followers.

Mbappé is a Christian and is fluent in French, English, and Spanish. At a press conference during UEFA Euro 2024, he encouraged French young people to vote against what he called "extreme views" in the 2024 French legislative election.

As of 2026, Mbappé is in a relationship with the Spanish actress and model Ester Expósito. (Note: Attributed to multiple references:)

=== Business ventures ===
Beyond his playing career, Mbappé has built a diversified investment and media portfolio. In 2022, he founded the Los Angeles-based production company Zebra Valley, which entered into a multi-year content partnership with the National Basketball Association later that year. Through his holding company Interconnected Ventures and its investment subsidiary Coalition Capital, he has acquired stakes in several companies, including the fantasy-sports platform Sorare, the German electronics company Loewe, and the French health technology company Alan.

On 30 July 2024, Coalition Capital acquired Oaktree Capital Management's 80% stake in the Ligue 2 football club SM Caen for a reported €15 million, making Mbappé the youngest majority owner of a professional football club in Europe at the time of the deal.

=== Philanthropy ===
On 22 February 2018, Mbappé and the former African strikers George Weah and Didier Drogba met with French president Emmanuel Macron and FIFA president Gianni Infantino about a sports development project in Africa. Mbappé stated that the development of African sport is important to him due to his parents' African origins.

Following France's victory at the 2018 World Cup, Mbappé donated his prize money to a French charity that helps handicapped people, saying he refused to be paid to represent the French team. He added: "I earn enough money, a lot of money. So I think it's important to help those in need. Many people are suffering, have illnesses. For people like us, lending a hand isn't much. It doesn't change my life, but it changes theirs."

On 28 January 2019, Mbappé donated $34,000 (roughly £26,000) to a crowdfunding campaign to finance a private search mission to find football player Emiliano Sala, whose light aircraft had gone missing over the English Channel a week earlier. Sala's body was eventually recovered in the wreckage of the aircraft. On 10 February, Mbappé donated an additional £27,000 to fund a search for the plane's pilot, David Ibbotson, who was later found to have also died in the crash.

On 19 November 2021, Mbappé and the Chinese diver Zhang Jiaqi became godfather and godmother, respectively, to two baby pandas at Beauval Zoo, as part of a campaign to raise awareness about the species.

=== Legal ===
In 2026, Mbappé provided testimony to French investigators regarding a rape accusation on his friend and former Paris Saint-Germain teammate Achraf Hakimi.

== Controversies ==
=== "Chinese dictator" comment ===
On 26 October 2026, during a French talk show The Bridge, Mbappé said that a meme "that makes me laugh the most...the one where there's a video of a guy, I think it's a Chinese dictator", which refers to Mao Zedong, the founder and first leader of the People's Republic of China. Mao's portrait superimposed with Mbappé's face appeared as he spoke. Several Chinese brands, including Eastroc Beverage, Mengniu Dairy and Milkground have terminated the deals with Mbappé. Chinese state broadcaster China Central Television also suspended La Liga matches. The Chinese foreign ministry spokesperson Guo Jiakun also stated that "words and deeds that hurt the feelings of the Chinese people will naturally be met with opposition from all sectors of Chinese society". Mbappe issued an apology the following day saying he "...[has] deep respect for the Chinese people and their history and [he is] sincerely sorry". Both Real Madrid and LaLiga have also issued statements distancing themselves from the comments.

== Career statistics ==
=== Club ===
As of match played 21 November 2026

Appearances and goals by club, season and competition
Club	Season	League			National cup (Note: Includes Coupe de France, Copa del Rey)		League cup (Note: Includes Coupe de la Ligue)		Europe		Other		Total	
Club	Season	Division	Apps	Goals	Apps	Goals	Apps	Goals	Apps	Goals	Apps	Goals	Apps	Goals
Monaco II	2015–16	CFA	10	2	—		—		—		—		10	2
Monaco II	2016–17	CFA	2	2	—		—		—		—		2	2
Monaco II	Total		12	4	—		—		—		—		12	4
Monaco	2015–16	Ligue 1	11	1	1	0	1	0	1 (Note: Appearance in UEFA Europa League)	0	—		14	1
Monaco	2016–17	Ligue 1	29	15	3	2	3	3	9 (Note: Appearances in UEFA Champions League)	6	—		44	26
Monaco	2017–18	Ligue 1	1	0	—		—		—		1 (Note: Appearance in Trophée des Champions)	0	2	0
Monaco	Total		41	16	4	2	4	3	10	6	1	0	60	27
Paris Saint-Germain (loan)	2017–18	Ligue 1	27	13	5	4	4	0	8	4	—		44	21
Paris Saint-Germain	2018–19	Ligue 1	29	33	4	2	2	0	8	4	0	0	43	39
Paris Saint-Germain	2019–20	Ligue 1	20	18	3	4	3	2	10	5	1	1	37	30
Paris Saint-Germain	2020–21	Ligue 1	31	27	5	7	—		10	8	1	0	47	42
Paris Saint-Germain	2021–22	Ligue 1	35	28	3	5	—		8	6	0	0	46	39
Paris Saint-Germain	2022–23	Ligue 1	34	29	1	5	—		8	7	0	0	43	41
Paris Saint-Germain	2023–24	Ligue 1	29	27	6	8	—		12	8	1	1	48	44
Paris Saint-Germain	Total		205	175	27	35	5	2	64	42	3	2	308	256
Real Madrid	2024–25	La Liga	34	31	4	2	—		14	7	7 (Note: One appearance and one goal in UEFA Super Cup, one appearance and one goal in FIFA Intercontinental Cup, two appearances and one goal in Supercopa de España, three appearances and one goal in FIFA Club World Cup)	4	59	44
Real Madrid	2025–26	La Liga	31	25	1	2	—		11	15	1 (Note: Appearance in Supercopa de España)	0	44	42
Real Madrid	2026–27	La Liga	13	13	0	0	—		4	4	0	0	17	17
Real Madrid	Total		78	69	5	4	—		29	26	8	4	120	103
Career total			336	264	36	41	13	5	103	74	12	6	500	390

=== International ===
As of match played 15 November 2026

Appearances and goals by national team and year
National team	Year	Apps	Goals
France	2017	10	1
France	2018	18	9
France	2019	6	3
France	2020	5	3
France	2021	14	8
France	2022	13	12
France	2023	9	10
France	2024	11	2
France	2025	8	7
France	2026	14	12
Total		108	67

== Honours ==
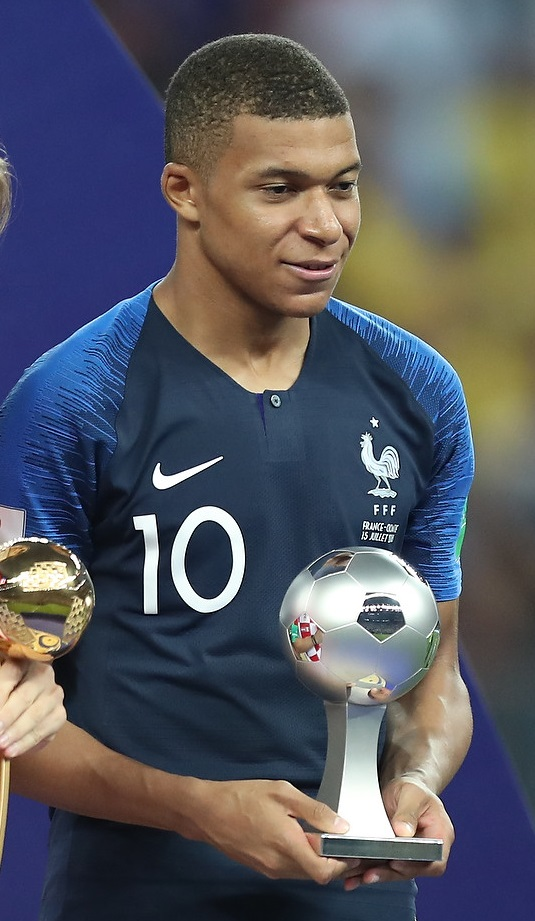
Mbappé holding his award for the 2018 FIFA World Cup Best Young Player

Monaco

- Ligue 1: 2016–17
- Coupe de la Ligue runner-up: 2016–17

Paris Saint-Germain

- Ligue 1: 2017–18, 2018–19, 2019–20, 2021–22, 2022–23, 2023–24
- Coupe de France: 2017–18, 2019–20, 2020–21, 2023–24; runner-up: 2018–19
- Coupe de la Ligue: 2017–18, 2019–20
- Trophée des Champions: 2019, 2020, 2023
- UEFA Champions League runner-up: 2019–20

Real Madrid

- UEFA Super Cup: 2024
- FIFA Intercontinental Cup: 2024
- Copa del Rey runner-up: 2024–25
- Supercopa de España runner-up: 2025, 2026

France U19

- UEFA European Under-19 Championship: 2016

France

- FIFA World Cup: 2018; runner-up: 2022
- UEFA Nations League: 2020–21; third place: 2024–25

Individual

- Ballon d'Or runner-up: 2026
- The Best FIFA Men's Player runner-up: 2022
- European Golden Shoe: 2024–25
- UEFA Champions League top scorer: 2023–24, 2025–26
- Pichichi Trophy: 2024–25, 2025–26
- FIFA World Cup Golden Boot: 2022, 2026
- Ligue 1 Player of the Year: 2018–19, 2020–21, 2021–22, 2022–23, 2023–24
- Ligue 1 top goalscorer: 2018–19, 2019–20, 2020–21, 2021–22, 2022–23, 2023–24
- FIFA World Cup Silver Ball: 2022
- FIFA World Cup Bronze Ball: 2026
- FIFA World Cup Young Player Award: 2018
- Kopa Trophy: 2018
- Golden Boy: 2017
- UEFA European Under-19 Championship Team of the Tournament: 2016
- Ligue 1 Young Player of the Year: 2016–17, 2017–18, 2018–19
- French Player of the Year: 2018, 2019, 2022–23, 2023–24
- FIFPRO World 11: 2018, 2019, 2022, 2023, 2024, 2025, 2026
- IFFHS Men's World Team: 2018, 2021, 2022, 2023, 2025
- IFFHS World's Best Top Goal Scorer: 2022, 2025
- Ligue 1 top assist provider: 2021–22
- WhoScored European Player of the Season (performance data by Opta): 2021–22
- UNFP Ligue 1 Team of the Year: 2016–17, 2017–18, 2018–19, 2020–21, 2021–22, 2022–23, 2023–24
- UEFA Champions League Team of the Season: 2016–17, 2019–20, 2020–21, 2021–22
- FIFA World Cup Dream Team: 2018, 2026
- UEFA Team of the Year: 2018
- Onze de Bronze: 2019
- Globe Soccer Best Player of the Year: 2021, 2024
- UEFA Nations League Finals Golden Boot: 2021, 2025 (shared)
- IFFHS World's Best Top Division Goal Scorer: 2025
- ESM Team of the Year: 2022–23, 2023–24
- The Athletic European Men's Team of the Season: 2023–24
- The Athletic Ligue 1 Team of the Season: 2023–24
- The Athletic Ligue 1 Player of the Season: 2023–24
- Gerd Müller Trophy: 2024 (shared)
- UNFP Best French Player Playing Abroad: 2024–25
- La Liga Team of the Season: 2024–25
- Real Madrid Player of the Season: 2024–25, 2025–26
- UNFP Ligue 1 Player of the Month: April 2017, March 2018, August 2018, February 2019, February 2021, August 2021, February 2022, November/December 2022, February 2023, October 2023, November 2023
- La Liga Player of the Month: January 2025, September 2025, October 2025, October 2026

Orders

- Knight of the Legion of Honour: 2018

== See also ==
- List of association football families
- List of Paris Saint-Germain FC records and statistics
- France national football team records and statistics
- List of men's footballers with 50 or more international goals
- List of top international men's football goalscorers by country
- List of men's footballers with 100 or more international caps
- List of FIFA World Cup top goalscorers
