= 2014 CAF Confederation Cup qualifying rounds =

- Dates: 7 February – 27 April 2014

The qualifying rounds of the 2014 CAF Confederation Cup were played from 7 February to 27 April 2014, to decide the eight football teams that advanced to the group stage.

== Draw ==
The draw for the preliminary, first and second qualifying rounds was held on 16 December 2013 in Marrakesh, Morocco. The entry round of each team was determined by their ranking points calculated based on performances in continental club championships for the period 2009–2013.

Byes to first round	Entrants to preliminary round
(Mali) Djoliba (14 pts); (Morocco) MAS Fez (12 pts); (Tunisia) CA Bizertin (10 pts); (Tunisia) Étoile du Sahel (7 pts); (Egypt) Ismaily (4 pts); (Ivory Coast) ASEC Mimosas (3 pts); (Nigeria) Bayelsa United (2 pts); (Sudan) Al-Ahly Shendi (2 pts); (Zambia) ZESCO United (2 pts); (Egypt) Wadi Degla; (Nigeria) Warri Wolves	(Sudan) Al-Ahli Atbara; (Morocco) Difaâ El Jadidi; (Democratic Republic of the Congo) CS Don Bosco; (Democratic Republic of the Congo) MK Etanchéité; (Algeria) CS Constantine; (Mali) Club Olympique de Bamako; (Republic of the Congo) AS Kondzo; (Republic of the Congo) CARA Brazzaville; (Angola) Petro de Luanda; (Angola) Desportivo da Huíla; (Cameroon) Union Douala; (Cameroon) Yong Sports Academy; (Ghana) Ebusua Dwarfs; (Ghana) Medeama; (Zimbabwe) How Mine; (Libya) Al-Ahli Tripoli; (Niger) ASN Nigelec; (Botswana) Gaborone United; (Burkina Faso) AS SONABEL; (Burundi) Académie Tchité; (Chad) ASLAD; (Equatorial Guinea) The Panthers; (Ethiopia) Defence Force; (Gabon) CF Mounana; (The Gambia) Gamtel; (Guinea) CI Kamsar; (Guinea-Bissau) Estrela de Cantanhez; (Kenya) AFC Leopards; (Liberia) Red Lions; (Madagascar) ASSM Elgeco Plus; (Mozambique) Ferroviário da Beira; (Namibia) African Stars; (Rwanda) AS Kigali; (Senegal) ASC Diaraf; (Seychelles) St Michel United; (Sierra Leone) RSLAF; (South Africa) SuperSport United; (South Sudan) Al-Malakia; (Tanzania) Azam; (Togo) AS Douanes Lomé; (Uganda) Victoria University; (Zanzibar) Chuoni

== Format ==
Qualification ties were played on a home-and-away two-legged basis. If the sides were level on aggregate after the second leg, the away goals rule was applied, and if still level, the tie proceeded directly to a penalty shoot-out (no extra time was played).

== Schedule ==
The schedule of each round was as follows.

Round	First leg	Second leg
Preliminary round	7–9 February 2014	14–16 February 2014
First round	28 February – 2 March 2014	7–9 March 2014
Second round	21–23 March 2014	28–30 March 2014
Play-off round	18–20 April 2014	25–27 April 2014

== Preliminary round ==
The preliminary round included the 42 teams that did not receive byes to the first round.

Team 1	Agg.	Team 2	1st leg	2nd leg
Al-Malakia (South Sudan)	1–5	(Republic of the Congo) CARA Brazzaville	0–1	1–4
AFC Leopards (Kenya)	4–1	(Ethiopia) Defence Force	2–0	2–1
SuperSport United (South Africa)	3–0	(Botswana) Gaborone United	2–0	1–0
AS Kigali (Rwanda)	2–1	(Burundi) Académie Tchité	1–0	1–1
Difaâ El Jadidi (Morocco)	1–0	(Burkina Faso) AS SONABEL	1–0	0–0
RSLAF (Sierra Leone)	0–3	(The Gambia) Gamtel	0–1	0–2
The Panthers (Equatorial Guinea)	1–4	(Ghana) Medeama	1–2	0–2
Azam (Tanzania)	1–2	(Mozambique) Ferroviário da Beira	1–0	0–2
St Michel United (Seychelles)	3–3 (7–6 p)	(Madagascar) ASSM Elgeco Plus	2–1	1–2
How Mine (Zimbabwe)	6–1	(Zanzibar) Chuoni	4–0	2–1
AS Kondzo (Republic of the Congo)	3–3 (a)	(Cameroon) Yong Sports Academy	2–0	1–3
ASN Nigelec (Niger)	3–4	(Algeria) CS Constantine	2–0	1–4
Red Lions (Liberia)	w/o	(Guinea-Bissau) Estrela de Cantanhez	—	—
Al-Ahli Tripoli (Libya)	1–2	(Mali) Club Olympique de Bamako	1–1	0–1
Al-Ahli Atbara (Sudan)	1–1 (a)	(Democratic Republic of the Congo) MK Etanchéité	1–1	0–0
African Stars (Namibia)	2–3	(Angola) Petro de Luanda	2–0	0–3
Ebusua Dwarfs (Ghana)	1–0	(Senegal) ASC Diaraf	1–0	0–0
AS Douanes Lomé (Togo)	3–1	(Guinea) CI Kamsar	2–0	1–1
CS Don Bosco (Democratic Republic of the Congo)	3–1	(Uganda) Victoria University	3–0	0–1
Union Douala (Cameroon)	4–2	(Chad) ASLAD	3–0	1–2
CF Mounana (Gabon)	3–4	(Angola) Desportivo da Huíla	3–1	0–3

7 February 2014
15:00 UTC+3

Al-Malakia (South Sudan)	0–1	(Republic of the Congo) CARA Brazzaville
	Report	Libaya 70'

Khartoum Stadium, Khartoum (Sudan)
Referee: Bazezew Belete (Ethiopia)
16 February 2014
15:30 UTC+1

CARA Brazzaville (Republic of the Congo)	4–1	(South Sudan) Al-Malakia
Mbon 9'; Baleckita 39'; Nguimbi 84'; Mukedi 90+2'	Report	Ackuech 12'

Stade Municipal, Pointe-Noire
Referee: Pacifique Ndabihawenimana (Burundi)

Note: The first leg was played outside of South Sudan due to security concerns.
CARA Brazzaville won 5–1 on aggregate and advanced to the first round.

9 February 2014
16:00 UTC+3

AFC Leopards (Kenya)	2–0	(Ethiopia) Defence Force
Imbalambala 18'; Keli 44'	Report

Nyayo National Stadium, Nairobi
Referee: Gervais Munyanziza (Rwanda)
16 February 2014
16:00 UTC+3

Defence Force (Ethiopia)	1–2	(Kenya) AFC Leopards
Tilahun 38'	Report	Wanga 46', 89'

Addis Ababa Stadium, Addis Ababa
Referee: Jean Claude Kinamvuidi Fuengi (Congo DR)

AFC Leopards won 4–1 on aggregate and advanced to the first round.

8 February 2014
20:15 UTC+2

SuperSport United (South Africa)	2–0	(Botswana) Gaborone United
Niang 13', 20'	Report

Lucas Masterpieces Moripe Stadium, Pretoria
Referee: Jones Andy Makhuwira (Malawi)
15 February 2014
16:00 UTC+2

Gaborone United (Botswana)	0–1	(South Africa) SuperSport United
	Report	Niang 40'

Botswana National Stadium, Gaborone
Referee: Ganesh Chutooree (Mauritius)

SuperSport United won 3–0 on aggregate and advanced to the first round.

8 February 2014
15:30 UTC+2

AS Kigali (Rwanda)	1–0	(Burundi) Académie Tchité
Ndikumana 58'	Report

Amahoro Stadium, Kigali
Referee: Sebit Rassas Librato (South Sudan)
16 February 2014
15:30 UTC+2

Académie Tchité (Burundi)	1–1	(Rwanda) AS Kigali
Nduwimana 55'	Report	Mbaraga 71'

Prince Louis Rwagasore Stadium, Bujumbura
Referee: Anthony Ogwayo (Kenya)

AS Kigali won 2–1 on aggregate and advanced to the first round.

8 February 2014
15:00 UTC±0

Difaâ El Jadidi (Morocco)	1–0	(Burkina Faso) AS SONABEL
Soumah 90+3'	Report

Stade El Abdi, El Jadida
Referee: Farouk Houasnia (Algeria)
16 February 2014
15:30 UTC±0

AS SONABEL (Burkina Faso)	0–0	(Morocco) Difaâ El Jadidi
	Report

Stade du 4-Août, Ouagadougou
Referee: Akintoye Koole (Benin)

Difaâ El Jadidi won 1–0 on aggregate and advanced to the first round.

8 February 2014
16:30 UTC±0

RSLAF (Sierra Leone)	0–1	(The Gambia) Gamtel
	Report	Ceesay 90'

National Stadium, Freetown
Referee: Mohamed Hamada (Mauritania)
15 February 2014
16:30 UTC±0

Gamtel (The Gambia)	2–0	(Sierra Leone) RSLAF
Gibba 3'; Jarjusey 86'	Report

Box Bar Stadium, Brikama
Referee: António Rodrigues (Cape Verde)

Gamtel won 3–0 on aggregate and advanced to the first round.

9 February 2014
15:00 UTC+1

The Panthers (Equatorial Guinea)	1–2	(Ghana) Medeama
Corrales 80'	Report	Helegbe 65'; Nzemaba 90'

Estadio de Malabo, Malabo
Referee: Messie Jessie Nkounkou (Congo)
16 February 2014
15:00 UTC±0

Medeama (Ghana)	2–0	(Equatorial Guinea) The Panthers
Boahene 20'; Asamoah 85'	Report

Sekondi-Takoradi Stadium, Sekondi-Takoradi
Referee: Abdul Karim Kabia (Sierra Leone)

Medeama won 4–1 on aggregate and advanced to the first round.

9 February 2014
16:00 UTC+3

Azam (Tanzania)	1–0	(Mozambique) Ferroviário da Beira
Tchetche 41'	Report

Chamazi Stadium, Dar es Salaam
Referee: Mutaz Khairalla (Sudan)
16 February 2014
15:00 UTC+2

Ferroviário da Beira (Mozambique)	2–0	(Tanzania) Azam
Simamunda 5', 70'	Report

Estádio do Ferroviário, Beira
Referee: Wisdom Chewe (Zambia)

Ferroviário da Beira won 2–1 on aggregate and advanced to the first round.

8 February 2014
16:30 UTC+4

St Michel United (Seychelles)	2–1	(Madagascar) ASSM Elgeco Plus
Fenosoa 24', 82'	Report	Fenomezana 69'

Stade Linité, Victoria
Referee: Dharamveer Hurbungs (Mauritius)
15 February 2014
14:30 UTC+3

ASSM Elgeco Plus (Madagascar)	2–1	(Seychelles) St Michel United
Gladyson 53', 63'	Report	Manoo 80'
Penalties
	6–7

Mahamasina Municipal Stadium, Antananarivo
Referee: Simanga Nhleko (Swaziland)

3–3 on aggregate. St Michel United won the penalty shoot-out and advanced to the first round.

8 February 2014
15:00 UTC+2

How Mine (Zimbabwe)	4–0	(Zanzibar) Chuoni
Musharu 41', 52'; Mupera 48' (pen.); Dube 80'	Report

Barbourfields Stadium, Bulawayo
Referee: Romualdo Do Rosario Baltazar (Angola)
15 February 2014
16:30 UTC+3

Chuoni (Zanzibar)	1–2	(Zimbabwe) How Mine
Moka 12'	Report	Masuku 25'; Musharu 81'

Amaan Stadium, Zanzibar City
Referee: Bashir Olad Arab (Somalia)

How Mine won 6–1 on aggregate and advanced to the first round.

7 February 2014
15:00 UTC+1

AS Kondzo (Republic of the Congo)	2–0	(Cameroon) Yong Sports Academy
Ngatsé 35'; Bakaki 66'	Report

Stade Alphonse Massemba-Débat, Brazzaville
Referee: Christian Mouity (Gabon)
16 February 2014
15:00 UTC+1

Yong Sports Academy (Cameroon)	3–1	(Republic of the Congo) AS Kondzo
Ajong 55'; Kongnyuy 76'; Talla 90+3'	Report	Sissoko 26'

Stade de la Réunification, Douala
Referee: Raul Aguiar dos Santos (São Tomé and Príncipe)

3–3 on aggregate. AS Kondzo won on the away goals rule and advanced to the first round.

8 February 2014
16:00 UTC+1

ASN Nigelec (Niger)	2–0	(Algeria) CS Constantine
Katakoré 63'; Nomao 85'	Report

Stade Général Seyni Kountché, Niamey
Referee: Moudo Jallow (Gambia)
15 February 2014
18:00 UTC+1

CS Constantine (Algeria)	4–1	(Niger) ASN Nigelec
Issoufou 36' (o.g.); Henaini 44'; Sameur 54'; Bezzaz 90+7' (pen.)	Report	Talatou 90+4'

Stade Mohamed Hamlaoui, Constantine
Referee: Mounir Mabrouk (Morocco)

CS Constantine won 4–3 on aggregate and advanced to the first round.

9 February 2014

Red Lions (Liberia)	Cancelled	(Guinea-Bissau) Estrela de Cantanhez
	Report

Antoinette Tubman Stadium, Monrovia
Referee: Raymond Coker (Sierra Leone)
16 February 2014

Estrela de Cantanhez (Guinea-Bissau)	Cancelled	(Liberia) Red Lions
	Report

Estádio 24 de Setembro, Bissau
Referee: Kossi Azaleko (Togo)

Red Lions advanced to the first round after Estrela de Cantanhez withdrew.

9 February 2014
14:00 UTC+1

Al-Ahli Tripoli (Libya)	1–1	(Mali) Club Olympique de Bamako
Al Ghanodi 73' (pen.)	Report	A. Diarra 90+3' (pen.)

Stade El Menzah, Tunis (Tunisia)
Referee: Mahmoud Ashour (Egypt)
14 February 2014
16:30 UTC±0

Club Olympique de Bamako (Mali)	1–0	(Libya) Al-Ahli Tripoli
Doumbia 53'	Report

Stade Modibo Kéïta, Bamako
Referee: Yakhouba Keita (Guinea)

Note: The first leg was played outside of Libya due to security concerns.
Club Olympique de Bamako won 2–1 on aggregate and advanced to the first round.

9 February 2014
19:30 UTC+3

Al-Ahli Atbara (Sudan)	1–1	(Democratic Republic of the Congo) MK Etanchéité
Zakaria 84'	Report	Kabangu 79'

Stade Al-Amal Atbara, Atbarah
Referee: Djamal Aden (Djibouti)
16 February 2014
15:30 UTC+1

MK Etanchéité (Democratic Republic of the Congo)	0–0	(Sudan) Al-Ahli Atbara
	Report

Stade Tata Raphaël, Kinshasa
Referee: Sheha Waziri (Tanzania)

1–1 on aggregate. MK Etanchéité won on the away goals rule and advanced to the first round.

7 February 2014
20:00 UTC+2

African Stars (Namibia)	2–0	(Angola) Petro de Luanda
Seibeb 79', 86'	Report

Sam Nujoma Stadium, Windhoek
Referee: Lwandile Mfiki (South Africa)
16 February 2014
16:00 UTC+1

Petro de Luanda (Angola)	3–0	(Namibia) African Stars
Toromba 2' (o.g.); Keita 43', 88'	Report

Estádio 11 de Novembro, Luanda
Referee: Wellington Kaoma (Zambia)

Petro de Luanda won 3–2 on aggregate and advanced to the first round.

9 February 2014
15:00 UTC±0

Ebusua Dwarfs (Ghana)	1–0	(Senegal) ASC Diaraf
Gadze 77'	Report

Cape Coast Sports Stadium, Cape Coast
Referee: Ousmane Sidibe (Mali)
15 February 2014
16:30 UTC±0

ASC Diaraf (Senegal)	0–0	(Ghana) Ebusua Dwarfs
	Report

Stade Demba Diop, Dakar
Referee: Gilberto dos Santos (Guinea-Bissau)

Ebusua Dwarfs won 1–0 on aggregate and advanced to the first round.

9 February 2014
15:00 UTC±0

AS Douanes Lomé (Togo)	2–0	(Guinea) CI Kamsar
Arimiyaou 6'; Badarou 80'	Report

Stade Municipal, Lomé
Referee: Abou Coulibaly (Ivory Coast)
14 February 2014
16:30 UTC±0

CI Kamsar (Guinea)	1–1	(Togo) AS Douanes Lomé
Sylla 85'	Report	Tawali 51'

Stade du 28 Septembre, Conakry
Referee: Reginald Lathbridge (Ghana)

AS Douanes Lomé won 3–1 on aggregate and advanced to the first round.

8 February 2014
15:30 UTC+2

CS Don Bosco (Democratic Republic of the Congo)	3–0	(Uganda) Victoria University
Lungu 7'; Pembele 42'; Sitali 63'	Report

Stade TP Mazembe, Lubumbashi
Referee: Davies Omweno (Kenya)
16 February 2014
16:00 UTC+3

Victoria University (Uganda)	1–0	(Democratic Republic of the Congo) CS Don Bosco
Odong 79'	Report

National Stadium, Kampala
Referee: Louis Hakizimana (Rwanda)

CS Don Bosco won 3–1 on aggregate and advanced to the first round.

8 February 2014
15:30 UTC+1

Union Douala (Cameroon)	3–0	(Chad) ASLAD
Ngoula 42'; Tambe 46'; Nandjou 49'	Report

Stade de la Réunification, Douala
Referee: Daniel Laryea (Ghana)
15 February 2014
15:30 UTC+1

ASLAD (Chad)	2–1	(Cameroon) Union Douala
Moita 44'; Ezaie 70'	Report	Tambe 32'

Stade Omnisports Idriss Mahamat Ouya, N'Djamena
Referee: Joaquin Esono (Equatorial Guinea)

Union Douala won 4–2 on aggregate and advanced to the first round.

8 February 2014
16:00 UTC+1

CF Mounana (Gabon)	3–1	(Angola) Desportivo da Huíla
Ibrahim 45'; Atchabao 61'; Barthélémy 90'	Report	Kumaka 49'

Stade Augustin Monédan de Sibang, Libreville
Referee: Gilberto dos Santos (Guinea-Bissau)
16 February 2014
15:30 UTC+1

Desportivo da Huíla (Angola)	3–0	(Gabon) CF Mounana
Ali 38'; Lito 65'; Pataca 80'	Report

Tundavala National Stadium, Lubango
Referee: Rainhold Shikongo (Namibia)

Desportivo da Huíla won 4–3 on aggregate and advanced to the first round.

== First round ==
The first round included 32 teams: the 21 winners of the preliminary round, and the 11 teams that received byes to this round.

Team 1	Agg.	Team 2	1st leg	2nd leg
CARA Brazzaville (Republic of the Congo)	1–3	(Tunisia) Étoile du Sahel	1–0	0–3
SuperSport United (South Africa)	4–2	(Kenya) AFC Leopards	2–0	2–2
AS Kigali (Rwanda)	1–1 (5–4 p)	(Sudan) Al-Ahly Shendi	1–0	0–1
Gamtel (The Gambia)	0–6	(Morocco) Difaâ El Jadidi	0–2	0–4
Medeama (Ghana)	4–2	(Morocco) MAS Fez	3–0	1–2
Ferroviário da Beira (Mozambique)	0–1	(Zambia) ZESCO United	0–0	0–1
How Mine (Zimbabwe)	6–4	(Seychelles) St Michel United	5–1	1–3
AS Kondzo (Republic of the Congo)	0–2	(Nigeria) Bayelsa United	0–0	0–2
Red Lions (Liberia)	0–3	(Algeria) CS Constantine	0–1	0–2
Club Olympique de Bamako (Mali)	1–3	(Ivory Coast) ASEC Mimosas	0–2	1–1
MK Etanchéité (Democratic Republic of the Congo)	0–0 (3–4 p)	(Egypt) Ismaily	0–0	0–0
Ebusua Dwarfs (Ghana)	2–4	(Angola) Petro de Luanda	2–0	0–4
AS Douanes Lomé (Togo)	1–3	(Egypt) Wadi Degla	1–1	0–2
CS Don Bosco (Democratic Republic of the Congo)	2–2 (a)	(Mali) Djoliba	2–1	0–1
Union Douala (Cameroon)	3–4	(Nigeria) Warri Wolves	2–3	1–1
Desportivo da Huíla (Angola)	0–3	(Tunisia) CA Bizertin	0–1	0–2

1 March 2014
15:30 UTC+1

CARA Brazzaville (Republic of the Congo)	1–0	(Tunisia) Étoile du Sahel
Itoua 43'	Report

Stade Municipal, Pointe-Noire
Referee: Alex Nsulumbi (Uganda)
7 March 2014
16:00 UTC+1

Étoile du Sahel (Tunisia)	3–0	(Republic of the Congo) CARA Brazzaville
Ghezal 25'; Slama 37'; Lahmar 48' (pen.)	Report

Stade Olympique de Sousse, Sousse
Referee: Hagi Wiish (Somalia)

Étoile du Sahel won 3–1 on aggregate and advanced to the second round.

1 March 2014
20:15 UTC+2

SuperSport United (South Africa)	2–0	(Kenya) AFC Leopards
Mathebula 43'; Chenene 90+1'	Report

Lucas Masterpieces Moripe Stadium, Pretoria
Referee: José Rachide (Mozambique)
9 March 2014
16:00 UTC+3

AFC Leopards (Kenya)	2–2	(South Africa) SuperSport United
Situma 50'; Wanga 90+1'	Report	Phala 54'; Doutie 80'

Nyayo National Stadium, Nairobi
Referee: Israel Mujuni (Tanzania)

SuperSport United won 4–2 on aggregate and advanced to the second round.

1 March 2014
15:30 UTC+2

AS Kigali (Rwanda)	1–0	(Sudan) Al-Ahly Shendi
Murengezi 78'	Report

Stade Régional Nyamirambo, Kigali
Referee: Tessema Bamlak (Ethiopia)
7 March 2014
20:00 UTC+3

Al-Ahly Shendi (Sudan)	1–0	(Rwanda) AS Kigali
Adel 90'	Report
Penalties
	4–5

Khartoum Stadium, Khartoum
Referee: Mensur Maeruf Kherseed (Eritrea)

1–1 on aggregate. AS Kigali won the penalty shoot-out and advanced to the second round.

1 March 2014
16:30 UTC±0

Gamtel (The Gambia)	0–2	(Morocco) Difaâ El Jadidi
	Report	Nanah 60', 89'

Box Bar Stadium, Brikama
Referee: Amadou Thiam (Mauritania)
9 March 2014
15:00 UTC±0

Difaâ El Jadidi (Morocco)	4–0	(The Gambia) Gamtel
Hadraf 16'; Nanah 22', 23', 86'	Report

Stade El Abdi, El Jadida
Referee: Christian Mouity (Gabon)

Difaâ El Jadidi won 6–0 on aggregate and advanced to the second round.

2 March 2014
15:00 UTC±0

Medeama (Ghana)	3–0	(Morocco) MAS Fez
Akowuah 28'; Moro 46'; Boahene 74'	Report

Sekondi-Takoradi Stadium, Sekondi-Takoradi
Referee: Gomno Daouda (Niger)
8 March 2014
20:00 UTC±0

MAS Fez (Morocco)	2–1	(Ghana) Medeama
Kanu 44'; Tigana 81'	Report	Bamaamar 48' (o.g.)

Fez Stadium, Fes
Referee: Kouamé N'Dri (Ivory Coast)

Medeama won 4–2 on aggregate and advanced to the second round.

2 March 2014
15:00 UTC+2

Ferroviário da Beira (Mozambique)	0–0	(Zambia) ZESCO United
	Report

Estádio do Ferroviário, Beira
Referee: Antonio Muachihuissa Caxala (Angola)
8 March 2014
15:00 UTC+2

ZESCO United (Zambia)	1–0	(Mozambique) Ferroviário da Beira
Kalengo 32'	Report

Levy Mwanawasa Stadium, Ndola
Referee: Norman Matemera (Zimbabwe)

ZESCO United won 1–0 on aggregate and advanced to the second round.

1 March 2014
15:00 UTC+2

How Mine (Zimbabwe)	5–1	(Seychelles) St Michel United
Musharu 20', 90'; Masuku 60'; Sithole 73'; Mupera 84' (pen.)	Report	Fenosoa 36' (pen.)

Barbourfields Stadium, Bulawayo
Referee: Joshua Bondo (Botswana)
8 March 2014
16:30 UTC+4

St Michel United (Seychelles)	3–1	(Zimbabwe) How Mine
Fenosoa 7', 17'; Nibourette 43'	Report	Musharu 57'

Stade Linité, Victoria
Referee: Victor Gomes (South Africa)

How Mine won 6–4 on aggregate and advanced to the second round.

28 February 2014
15:30 UTC+1

AS Kondzo (Republic of the Congo)	0–0	(Nigeria) Bayelsa United
	Report

Stade Alphonse Massemba-Débat, Brazzaville
Referee: Samuel Chirindza (Mozambique)
8 March 2014
16:00 UTC+1

Bayelsa United (Nigeria)	2–0	(Republic of the Congo) AS Kondzo
Ebimobowei 23'; Buhari 59'	Report

Sapele Stadium, Sapele
Referee: Fidel Gomes (Guinea-Bissau)

Bayelsa United won 2–0 on aggregate and advanced to the second round.

28 February 2014
16:00 UTC±0

Red Lions (Liberia)	0–1	(Algeria) CS Constantine
	Report	Zerdab 57'

Antoinette Tubman Stadium, Monrovia
Referee: Louis Sanou (Burkina Faso)
9 March 2014
18:00 UTC+1

CS Constantine (Algeria)	2–0	(Liberia) Red Lions
Yahia 10' (pen.); Zerdab 58'	Report

Stade Mohamed Hamlaoui, Constantine
Referee: Mohamed Said Kordi (Tunisia)

CS Constantine won 3–0 on aggregate and advanced to the second round.

2 March 2014
17:00 UTC±0

Club Olympique de Bamako (Mali)	0–2	(Ivory Coast) ASEC Mimosas
	Report	Boua 11' (pen.); Foba 90'

Stade Modibo Kéïta, Bamako
Referee: Rédouane Jiyed (Morocco)
8 March 2014
15:30 UTC±0

ASEC Mimosas (Ivory Coast)	1–1	(Mali) Club Olympique de Bamako
Foba 41'	Report	I. Diarra 16'

Stade Félix Houphouët-Boigny, Abidjan
Referee: Brice Igue (Benin)

ASEC Mimosas won 3–1 on aggregate and advanced to the second round.

2 March 2014
15:30 UTC+1

MK Etanchéité (Democratic Republic of the Congo)	0–0	(Egypt) Ismaily
	Report

Stade Tata Raphaël, Kinshasa
Referee: Mokhtar Amalou (Algeria)
9 March 2014
17:00 UTC+2

Ismaily (Egypt)	0–0	(Democratic Republic of the Congo) MK Etanchéité
	Report
Penalties
	4–3

Ismailia Stadium, Ismaïlia
Referee: Simanga Nhleko (Swaziland)

0–0 on aggregate. Ismaily won the penalty shoot-out and advanced to the second round.

2 March 2014
15:00 UTC±0

Ebusua Dwarfs (Ghana)	2–0	(Angola) Petro de Luanda
Ismael 85'; Adjei-Mensah 89'	Report

Cape Coast Sports Stadium, Cape Coast
Referee: Emmanuel Neewon (Liberia)
9 March 2014
16:00 UTC+1

Petro de Luanda (Angola)	4–0	(Ghana) Ebusua Dwarfs
Flavio 33', 81'; Gilberto 73'; Keita 85'	Report

Estádio 11 de Novembro, Luanda
Referee: Joaquin Esono (Equatorial Guinea)

Petro de Luanda won 4–2 on aggregate and advanced to the second round.

2 March 2014
15:30 UTC±0

AS Douanes Lomé (Togo)	1–1	(Egypt) Wadi Degla
Badarou 69' (pen.)	Report	Said 21'

Stade Municipal, Lomé
Referee: Joshua Amao (Nigeria)
9 March 2014
19:00 UTC+2

Wadi Degla (Egypt)	2–0	(Togo) AS Douanes Lomé
Adel 23'; Al Agha 51'	Report

30 June Stadium, Cairo
Referee: Mal Mohamadou (Cameroon)

Wadi Degla won 3–1 on aggregate and advanced to the second round.

1 March 2014
15:30 UTC+2

CS Don Bosco (Democratic Republic of the Congo)	2–1	(Mali) Djoliba
Ushindi 67' (pen.); Kabulo 76'	Report	Sinayoko 5'

Stade TP Mazembe, Lubumbashi
Referee: Serge Soumou (Congo)
9 March 2014
16:00 UTC±0

Djoliba (Mali)	1–0	(Democratic Republic of the Congo) CS Don Bosco
Mallé 40'	Report

Stade Modibo Kéïta, Bamako
Referee: Maguette N'Diaye (Senegal)

2–2 on aggregate. Djoliba won on the away goals rule and advanced to the second round.

1 March 2014
15:30 UTC+1

Union Douala (Cameroon)	2–3	(Nigeria) Warri Wolves
Ngoula 15'; Ngansop 80'	Report	Najare 12'; Oghenekaro 36'; Ibenegbu 83'

Stade de la Réunification, Douala
Referee: Gehad Grisha (Egypt)
9 March 2014
16:00 UTC+1

Warri Wolves (Nigeria)	1–1	(Cameroon) Union Douala
Najare 55' (pen.)	Report	Tchani 89' (pen.)

Warri Township Stadium, Warri
Referee: Osiase Koto (Lesotho)

Warri Wolves won 4–3 on aggregate and advanced to the second round.

2 March 2014
15:30 UTC+1

Desportivo da Huíla (Angola)	0–1	(Tunisia) CA Bizertin
	Report	Rjaïbi 51'

Tundavala National Stadium, Lubango
Referee: Cecil Fleischer (Ghana)
9 March 2014
14:30 UTC+1

CA Bizertin (Tunisia)	2–0	(Angola) Desportivo da Huíla
Machani 11'; Mbengue 88'	Report

Stade 15 Octobre, Bizerte
Referee: Mehdi Abid Charef (Algeria)

CA Bizertin won 3–0 on aggregate and advanced to the second round.

== Second round ==
The second round included the 16 winners of the first round.

Team 1	Agg.	Team 2	1st leg	2nd leg
Étoile du Sahel (Tunisia)	5–1	(South Africa) SuperSport United	1–0	4–1
AS Kigali (Rwanda)	1–3	(Morocco) Difaâ El Jadidi	1–0	0–3
Medeama (Ghana)	2–1	(Zambia) ZESCO United	2–0	0–1
How Mine (Zimbabwe)	2–3	(Nigeria) Bayelsa United	2–1	0–2
CS Constantine (Algeria)	1–6	(Ivory Coast) ASEC Mimosas	1–0	0–6
Ismaily (Egypt)	0–1	(Angola) Petro de Luanda	0–0	0–1
Wadi Degla (Egypt)	2–2 (2–3 p)	(Mali) Djoliba	2–0	0–2
Warri Wolves (Nigeria)	1–2	(Tunisia) CA Bizertin	0–0	1–2

22 March 2014
16:00 UTC+1

Étoile du Sahel (Tunisia)	1–0	(South Africa) SuperSport United
Brigui 8'	Report

Stade Olympique de Sousse, Sousse
Referee: Aboubacar Mario Bangoura (Guinea)
29 March 2014
20:30 UTC+2

SuperSport United (South Africa)	1–4	(Tunisia) Étoile du Sahel
Manyama 45' (pen.)	Report	Dramé 36', 63'; Mouihbi 74'; Troudi 90+1'

Lucas Masterpieces Moripe Stadium, Pretoria
Referee: Bakary Gassama (Gambia)

Étoile du Sahel won 5–1 on aggregate and advanced to the play-off round.

22 March 2014
15:30 UTC+2

AS Kigali (Rwanda)	1–0	(Morocco) Difaâ El Jadidi
Niyonzima 72'	Report

Stade Régional Nyamirambo, Kigali
Referee: Bernard Camille (Seychelles)
29 March 2014
15:00 UTC±0

Difaâ El Jadidi (Morocco)	3–0	(Rwanda) AS Kigali
Hadraf 49'; Soumah 70'; Chagou 73' (pen.)	Report

Stade El Abdi, El Jadida
Referee: Juste Ephrem Zio (Burkina Faso)

Difaâ El Jadidi won 3–1 on aggregate and advanced to the play-off round.

23 March 2014
15:00 UTC±0

Medeama (Ghana)	2–0	(Zambia) ZESCO United
Asamoah 10'; Helegbe 83' (pen.)	Report

Sekondi-Takoradi Stadium, Sekondi-Takoradi
Referee: Mohamed Ragab Omar (Libya)
30 March 2014
15:00 UTC+2

ZESCO United (Zambia)	1–0	(Ghana) Medeama
Mwanza 49'	Report

Levy Mwanawasa Stadium, Ndola
Referee: Joshua Amao (Nigeria)

Medeama won 2–1 on aggregate and advanced to the play-off round.

22 March 2014
15:00 UTC+2

How Mine (Zimbabwe)	2–1	(Nigeria) Bayelsa United
Kadzola 60'; Mupera 90+3' (pen.)	Report	Okorowanta 47'

Barbourfields Stadium, Bulawayo
Referee: Mensur Maeruf Kherseed (Eritrea)
29 March 2014
15:00 UTC+1

Bayelsa United (Nigeria)	2–0	(Zimbabwe) How Mine
Buhari 55'; Okechukwu 81'	Report

Sapele Stadium, Sapele
Referee: Youssef Essrayri (Tunisia)

Bayelsa United won 3–2 on aggregate and advanced to the play-off round.

23 March 2014
17:15 UTC+1

CS Constantine (Algeria)	1–0	(Ivory Coast) ASEC Mimosas
Sameur 82' (pen.)	Report

Stade Mohamed Hamlaoui, Constantine
Referee: Eric Otogo-Castane (Gabon)
30 March 2014
15:30 UTC±0

ASEC Mimosas (Ivory Coast)	6–0	(Algeria) CS Constantine
Fofana 26', 62'; Kangouté 48'; Foba 73', 89'; Loua 90+1'	Report

Stade Félix Houphouët-Boigny, Abidjan
Referee: Janny Sikazwe (Zambia)

ASEC Mimosas won 6–1 on aggregate and advanced to the play-off round.

23 March 2014
17:00 UTC+2

Ismaily (Egypt)	0–0	(Angola) Petro de Luanda
	Report

Ismailia Stadium, Ismaïlia
Referee: Ali Lemghaifry (Mauritania)
30 March 2014
16:00 UTC+1

Petro de Luanda (Angola)	1–0	(Egypt) Ismaily
Abdul 54'	Report

Estádio 11 de Novembro, Luanda
Referee: Victor Gomes (South Africa)

Petro de Luanda won 1–0 on aggregate and advanced to the play-off round.

22 March 2014
19:00 UTC+2

Wadi Degla (Egypt)	2–0	(Mali) Djoliba
Talaat 57'; Abd. Traoré 90+1' (o.g.)	Report

Cairo Military Academy Stadium, Cairo
Referee: Hamada Nampiandraza (Madagascar)
30 March 2014
16:30 UTC±0

Djoliba (Mali)	2–0	(Egypt) Wadi Degla
Mallé 58'; Sinayoko 70'	Report
Penalties
	3–2

Stade Modibo Kéïta, Bamako
Referee: Denis Batte (Uganda)

2–2 on aggregate. Djoliba won the penalty shoot-out and advanced to the play-off round.

23 March 2014
16:00 UTC+1

Warri Wolves (Nigeria)	0–0	(Tunisia) CA Bizertin
	Report

Warri Township Stadium, Warri
Referee: Noureddine El Jaafari (Morocco)
30 March 2014
14:30 UTC+1

CA Bizertin (Tunisia)	2–1	(Nigeria) Warri Wolves
Rjaïbi 6', 45+3'	Report	Anubi 26'

Stade 15 Octobre, Bizerte
Referee: Mutaz Khairalla (Sudan)

CA Bizertin won 2–1 on aggregate and advanced to the play-off round.

== Play-off round ==
The play-off round included 16 teams: the eight winners of the Confederation Cup second round and the eight losers of the Champions League second round.

The draw for the play-off round was held on 1 April 2014, 11:00 UTC+2, at the CAF Headquarters in Cairo, Egypt. The winners of the Confederation Cup second round were drawn against the losers of the Champions League second round, with the former hosting the second leg. Four ties contained a seeded loser of the Champions League second round (Pot A) and an unseeded winner of the Confederation Cup second round (Pot B), and the other four ties contained a seeded winner of the Confederation Cup second round (Pot C) and an unseeded loser of the Champions League second round (Pot D). The seeding of each team was determined by their ranking points calculated based on performances in continental club championships for the period 2009–2013.

The following 16 teams were entered into the draw:

Pot A	Pot B	Pot C	Pot D
(Egypt) Al-Ahly (57 pts); (Cameroon) Coton Sport (21 pts); (Republic of the Congo) AC Léopards (21 pts); (Ivory Coast) Séwé Sport (10 pts)	(Nigeria) Bayelsa United (2 pts); (Morocco) Difaâ El Jadidi (0 pts); (Ghana) Medeama (0 pts); (Angola) Petro de Luanda (0 pts)	(Mali) Djoliba (14 pts); (Tunisia) CA Bizertin (10 pts); (Tunisia) Étoile du Sahel (7 pts); (Ivory Coast) ASEC Mimosas (3 pts)	(Mali) AS Real Bamako (0 pts); (South Africa) Kaizer Chiefs (0 pts); (Zambia) Nkana (0 pts); (Guinea) Horoya (0 pts)

The winners of each tie advanced to the group stage.

Team 1	Agg.	Team 2	1st leg	2nd leg
Al-Ahly (Egypt)	2–2 (a)	(Morocco) Difaâ El Jadidi	1–0	1–2
AS Real Bamako (Mali)	2–1	(Mali) Djoliba	2–1	0–0
AC Léopards (Republic of the Congo)	2–2 (5–4 p)	(Ghana) Medeama	2–0	0–2
Kaizer Chiefs (South Africa)	1–3	(Ivory Coast) ASEC Mimosas	1–2	0–1
Coton Sport (Cameroon)	4–3	(Angola) Petro de Luanda	2–1	2–2
Horoya (Guinea)	0–1	(Tunisia) Étoile du Sahel	0–0	0–1
Séwé Sport (Ivory Coast)	3–0	(Nigeria) Bayelsa United	2–0	1–0
Nkana (Zambia)	1–1 (a)	(Tunisia) CA Bizertin	0–0	1–1

20 April 2014
19:00 UTC+2

Al-Ahly (Egypt)	1–0	(Morocco) Difaâ El Jadidi
Said 20'	Report

30 June Stadium, Cairo
Referee: Eric Otogo-Castane (Gabon)
26 April 2014
16:00 UTC+1

Difaâ El Jadidi (Morocco)	2–1	(Egypt) Al-Ahly
Chagou 62' (pen.); Lengoualama 78'	Report	Raouf 90+4'

Stade El Abdi, El Jadida
Referee: Mohamed Said Kordi (Tunisia)

2–2 on aggregate. Al-Ahly won on the away goals rule and advanced to the group stage.

20 April 2014
17:00 UTC±0

AS Real Bamako (Mali)	2–1	(Mali) Djoliba
Doumbia 27'; Koné 73'	Report	Sinayoko 35'

Stade Modibo Kéïta, Bamako
Referee: Yakhouba Keita (Guinea)
27 April 2014
17:00 UTC±0

Djoliba (Mali)	0–0	(Mali) AS Real Bamako
	Report

Stade Modibo Kéïta, Bamako
Referee: Ali Lemghaifry (Mauritania)

AS Real Bamako won 2–1 on aggregate and advanced to the group stage.

20 April 2014
15:30 UTC+1

AC Léopards (Republic of the Congo)	2–0	(Ghana) Medeama
Kalema 25' (pen.), 70' (pen.)	Report

Stade Denis Sassou Nguesso, Dolisie
Referee: Aurélien Juenkou (Cameroon)
27 April 2014
15:00 UTC±0

Medeama (Ghana)	2–0	(Republic of the Congo) AC Léopards
Tagoe 80' (pen.); Kwofie 85'	Report
Penalties
	4–5

Sekondi-Takoradi Stadium, Sekondi-Takoradi
Referee: Denis Dembélé (Ivory Coast)

2–2 on aggregate. AC Léopards won the penalty shoot-out and advanced to the group stage.

20 April 2014
15:00 UTC+2

Kaizer Chiefs (South Africa)	1–2	(Ivory Coast) ASEC Mimosas
Rusike 86'	Report	Zagbayou 35'; Boua 90+2'

Dobsonville Stadium, Johannesburg
Referee: Sylvester Kirwa (Kenya)
27 April 2014
15:30 UTC±0

ASEC Mimosas (Ivory Coast)	1–0	(South Africa) Kaizer Chiefs
Foba 76'	Report

Stade Félix Houphouët-Boigny, Abidjan
Referee: Malang Diedhiou (Senegal)

ASEC Mimosas won 3–1 on aggregate and advanced to the group stage.

20 April 2014
15:00 UTC+1

Coton Sport (Cameroon)	2–1	(Angola) Petro de Luanda
Zimbori-Auzingoni 22' (pen.); Mbah 75'	Report	Job 50'

Roumdé Adjia Stadium, Garoua
Referee: Rédouane Jiyed (Morocco)
27 April 2014
16:00 UTC+1

Petro de Luanda (Angola)	2–2	(Cameroon) Coton Sport
Abdul 10'; Keita 51'	Report	Daouda 15'; Djeugoué 86'

Estádio 11 de Novembro, Luanda
Referee: Bernard Camille (Seychelles)

Coton Sport won 4–3 on aggregate and advanced to the group stage.

20 April 2014
16:30 UTC±0

Horoya (Guinea)	0–0	(Tunisia) Étoile du Sahel
	Report

Stade du 28 Septembre, Conakry
Referee: William Agbovi (Ghana)
27 April 2014
16:00 UTC+1

Étoile du Sahel (Tunisia)	1–0	(Guinea) Horoya
Lahmar 84'	Report

Stade Olympique de Sousse, Sousse
Referee: El Fadil Mohamed (Sudan)

Étoile du Sahel won 1–0 on aggregate and advanced to the group stage.

20 April 2014
15:30 UTC±0

Séwé Sport (Ivory Coast)	2–0	(Nigeria) Bayelsa United
Assalé 45', 90+2'	Report

Stade Robert Champroux, Abidjan
Referee: Thierry Nkurunziza (Burundi)
26 April 2014
16:00 UTC+1

Bayelsa United (Nigeria)	0–1	(Ivory Coast) Séwé Sport
	Report	Kouamé 89' (pen.)

Sapele Stadium, Sapele
Referee: Mahmoud Ashour (Egypt)

Séwé Sport won 3–0 on aggregate and advanced to the group stage.

19 April 2014
15:00 UTC+2

Nkana (Zambia)	0–0	(Tunisia) CA Bizertin
	Report

Nkana Stadium, Kitwe
Referee: Ali Adelaïd (Comoros)
27 April 2014
15:00 UTC+1

CA Bizertin (Tunisia)	1–1	(Zambia) Nkana
Mwanza 20' (o.g.)	Report	Mwansa 80' (pen.)

Stade 15 Octobre, Bizerte
Referee: Mohamed Benouza (Algeria)

1–1 on aggregate. Nkana won on the away goals rule and advanced to the group stage.
