= 2013–14 CS Constantine season =

CS Constantine
2013–14 season
- Owner: Tassili Airlines
- Chairman: Mohamed Boulhabib
- Head coach: Diego Garzitto (from 30 June 2013) (until 5 December 2013); Lounès Gaouaoui (interim) (from 6 December 2013) (until 4 January 2014); Bernard Simondi (from 5 January 2014)
- Stadium: Stade Mohamed Hamlaoui, Constantine
- Ligue 1: 10th
- Algerian Cup: Quarter-final
- CAF Confederation Cup: Second round
- Top goalscorer: League: Hamza Boulemdaïs (12); All: Hamza Boulemdaïs (14)
Home colours	Away colours

In the 2013–14 season, CS Constantine competed in the Ligue 1 for the 18th season, as well as the Algerian Cup.

== Squad list ==
Players and squad numbers last updated on 24 August 2013.
Note: Flags indicate national team as has been defined under FIFA eligibility rules. Players may hold more than one non-FIFA nationality.

No.	Nat.	Position	Name	Date of birth (age)	Signed from
Goalkeepers
16	(Algeria)	GK	Abderaouf Natèche	16 October 1982 (aged 30)	(Algeria) NA Hussein Dey
71	(Algeria)	GK	Cédric Si Mohamed	9 January 1985 (aged 28)	(Algeria) JSM Béjaïa
Defenders
28	(Algeria)	LB	Amer Belakhdar	20 January 1980 (aged 33)	(Algeria) JSM Béjaïa
23	(Algeria)	CB	Adel Maïza	18 March 1983 (aged 30)	(Algeria) JS Kabylie
4	(Mali)	CB	Ousmane Berthé	5 February 1987 (aged 26)	(South Africa) Jomo Cosmos
2	(Algeria)	RB	Amine Boulahia	3 February 1987 (aged 26)	(Algeria) JSM Béjaïa
67	(Algeria)	CB	Zine El-Abidine Sebbah	22 March 1987 (aged 26)	(Algeria) MC Oran
	(Algeria)	CB	Rachid Bouhenna	29 June 1991 (aged 22)	(France) AFC Compiègne
Midfielders
77	(Algeria)	LM / LW / RW	Yacine Bezzaz	10 July 1981 (aged 32)	(Algeria) USM Alger
10	(Algeria)	AM	Samy Houri	9 August 1985 (aged 28)	(Belgium) FC Brussels
20	(Algeria)	DM	Fouad Allag	17 April 1985 (aged 28)	(Algeria) NA Hussein Dey
6	(Cameroon)	DM / CM	Gilles Ngomo	23 August 1987 (aged 26)	(Algeria) AS Khroub
82	(Algeria)	AM	Zahir Zerdab	9 January 1982 (aged 31)	(France) FC Rouen
21	(Algeria)	DM	Hamza Ziad	29 February 1988 (aged 25)	(Algeria) CA Batna
8	(Algeria)	RM	Karim Naït Yahia	19 December 1980 (aged 32)	(Algeria) AS Khroub
31	(Algeria)	DM	Abdelmadjid Benatia	12 December 1984 (aged 28)	(Algeria) USM Bel Abbès
18	(Algeria)	DM	Abdelhak Sameur	12 November 1990 (aged 22)	(Algeria) WA Tlemcen
86	(Algeria)	LM	Bilal Behloul	28 March 1986 (aged 27)	(Algeria) JSM Béjaïa
	(Algeria)	DM	Antar Boucherit	18 December 1983 (aged 29)	(Algeria) JSM Béjaïa
Forwards
24	(Algeria)		Eyemen Henaini	4 May 1984 (aged 29)	(France) ÉFC Fréjus
19	(Algeria)	ST	Abdenour Hadiouche	30 December 1984 (aged 28)	(Algeria) JS Kabylie
11	(Algeria)	ST	Mohamed Derrag	3 April 1985 (aged 28)	(Algeria) JSM Béjaïa
15	(Algeria)	ST	Hamza Boulemdaïs	22 November 1982 (aged 30)	(Algeria) JS Kabylie
	(Algeria)	LW	Réda Sayah	19 June 1989 (aged 24)	(Algeria) MC Alger

== Pre-season and friendlies ==
30 July 2013 Friendly	CS Constantine (Algeria)	2–2	(Spain) Espanyol	Constantine
22:40 UTC+1	Boucherit 48' (pen.); Behloul 90+3'	Report	Stuani 3'; Lanzarote 78'	Stadium: Stade Mohamed Hamlaoui
Note: Lineup for CS Constantine

== Competitions ==
=== Overview ===
Competition	Record								Started round	Final position / round	First match	Last match
Competition	G	W	D	L	GF	GA	GD	Win %	Started round	Final position / round	First match	Last match
Ligue 1	30	10	11	9	30	31	−1	33.33	—N/a	13th	24 August 2013	24 May 2014
Algerian Cup	4	2	1	1	5	3	+2	50.00	Round of 64	Quarter-final	6 December 2013	18 February 2014
Confederation Cup	6	4	0	2	8	9	−1	66.67	Preliminary round	Second round	8 February 2014	30 March 2014
Total	40	16	12	12	43	43	+0	40.00				

Updated to match played 9 May 2017
Source: Competitions

== League table ==
Pos	Team	Pld	W	D	L	GF	GA	GD	Pts	Qualification or relegation
8	ASO Chlef	30	11	10	9	29	19	+10	43	Qualification for the Confederation Cup preliminary round
9	JS Saoura	30	12	7	11	38	36	+2	43	
10	CS Constantine	30	10	11	9	30	31	−1	41	
11	MO Béjaïa	30	10	6	14	29	35	−6	36	
12	MC Oran	30	9	8	13	33	40	−7	35	

Updated to match(es) played on 22 May 2014. Source: DZFoot
Rules for classification: 1) points; 2) head-to-head points; 3) head-to-head goal difference; 4) goal difference; 5) total goals; 6) fairplay ranking; 7) playoff.

=== Results summary ===
Overall								Home						Away					
Pld	W	D	L	GF	GA	GD	Pts	W	D	L	GF	GA	GD	W	D	L	GF	GA	GD
30	10	11	9	29	32	−3	41	5	8	2	15	12	+3	5	3	7	14	20	−6

Last updated: 29 December 2014.
Source: Competitive matches

=== Results by round ===
Round	1	2	3	4	5	6	7	8	9	10	11	12	13	14	15	16	17	18	19	20	21	22	23	24	25	26	27	28	29	30
Ground	H	A	H	A	A	H	A	H	A	H	A	H	A	H	A	A	H	A	H	H	A	H	A	H	A	H	A	H	A	H
Result	D	W	W	W	D	D	D	W	D	W	L	D	L	L	W	W	D	L	D	W	L	L	W	W	L	D	L	D	L	D
Position	8	5	4	2	2	3	3	2	2	1	3	4	5	7	6	6	3	6	6	5	6	8	6	6	8	8	8	9	10	10

Updated to match(es) played on 29 December 2014. Source: Competitive matches
A = Away; H = Home; W = Win; D = Draw; L = Loss

=== Matches ===
24 August 2013 Round 1	CS Constantine	0–0	CA Bordj Bou Arréridj	Constantine
18:00		Report		Stadium: Stade Mohamed Hamlaoui; Referee: Mokhtar Amalou

31 August 2013 Round 2	USM El Harrach	1–2	CS Constantine	Algiers
17:00	Younès 19'	Report	63' (pen.) Boucherit; 77' Boulemdaïs	Stadium: Stade 1er Novembre 1954; Referee: Mohamed Bachir

3 September 2013 Round 3	CS Constantine	2–1	MO Béjaïa	Constantine
18:00	Boucherit 63' (pen.); Boulemdaïs 77'	Report	55' S. Chebana	Stadium: Stade Mohamed Hamlaoui; Referee: Said Aouina

14 September 2013 Round 4	JS Saoura	0–3	CS Constantine	Béchar
16:00		Report	1', 35' Boulemdaïs; 85' Henaini	Stadium: Stade 20 Août 1955; Referee: Mohamed Bichari

21 September 2013 Round 5	MC Oran	0–0	CS Constantine	Oran
18:00		Report		Stadium: Stade Ahmed Zabana; Referee: Sofiane Bousseter

28 September 2013 Round 6	CS Constantine	0–0	MC El Eulma	Constantine
18:00		Report		Stadium: Stade Mohamed Hamlaoui; Referee: Mohamed Benouza (Algeria)

4 October 2013 Round 7	USM Alger	1–1	CS Constantine	Algiers
17:45	Chatal 1'	Report	45' Boulemdaïs	Stadium: Stade Omar Hamadi; Referee: Djamel Haimoudi

19 October 2013 Round 8	CS Constantine	2–1	CRB Aïn Fakroun	Constantine
18:00	Sameur 84' (pen.), 89'	Report	90+3' A. Kara	Stadium: Stade Mohamed Hamlaoui; Referee: Abderrezzak Arab

26 October 2013 Round 9	ES Sétif	1–1	CS Constantine	Sétif
17:45	Djahnit 25'	Report	39' Naït Yahia	Stadium: Stade 8 Mai 1945; Referee: Redouane Necib

2 November 2013 Round 10	CS Constantine	1–0	CR Belouizdad	Constantine
15:00	Bezzaz 39' (pen.)	Report		Stadium: Stade Mohamed Hamlaoui; Referee: Said Aouina

9 November 2013 Round 11	RC Arbaâ	1–0	CS Constantine	Blida
15:00	A. Amiri 89'	Report		Stadium: Stade Frères Brakni; Referee: Mohamed Ghorbal

23 November 2013 Round 12	CS Constantine	1–1	JSM Béjaïa	Constantine
16:00	Maïza 62'	Report	85' A. Belgherbi	Stadium: Stade Mohamed Hamlaoui; Referee: Mohamed Saïdi

30 November 2013 Round 13	ASO Chlef	3–0	CS Constantine	Chlef
17:45	Tedjar 4'; Daham 29', 73'	Report		Stadium: Stade Mohamed Boumezrag; Referee: Mohamed Bichari

14 December 2013 Round 14	CS Constantine	0–1	MC Alger	Constantine
16:00		Report	74' Bouguèche	Stadium: Stade Mohamed Hamlaoui; Referee: Farouk Mial

27 December 2013 Round 15	JS Kabylie	1–2	CS Constantine	Tizi Ouzou
16:45	Beziouen 79'	Report	85' Maïza; 90+6' (pen.) Boulemdaïs	Stadium: Stade du 1er Novembre 1954; Referee: Mohamed Benouza

18 January 2014 Round 16	CA Bordj Bou Arréridj	0–1	CS Constantine	Bordj Bou Arréridj
16:00		Report	39' Zerdab	Stadium: Stade 20 Août 1955; Referee: Merzak Halalchi

1 February 2014 Round 17	CS Constantine	1–1	USM El Harrach	Constantine
16:00	Benatia 83'	Report	90' Boumechra	Stadium: Stade Mohamed Hamlaoui; Referee: Youssef Zerrouki

8 February 2014 Round 18	MO Béjaïa	2–0	CS Constantine	Béjaïa
17:45	Yettou 33', 38'	Report		Stadium: Stade de l'Unité Maghrébine; Referee: Mohamed Bichari

14 February 2014 Round 19	CS Constantine	1–1	JS Saoura	Constantine
15:00	Houri 63'	Report	74' Aoudou	Stadium: Stade Mohamed Hamlaoui; Referee: Farouk Mial

22 February 2014 Round 20	CS Constantine	2–1	MC Oran	Constantine
15:00	Bezzaz 50' (pen.); Boulemdaïs 80'	Report	9' I. Korbiaa	Stadium: Stade Mohamed Hamlaoui; Referee: Said Aouina

28 February 2014 Round 21	MC El Eulma	4–0	CS Constantine	El Eulma
16:00	Hamiti 14', 44' (pen.); Berchiche 34'; Hammami 90+3'	Report		Stadium: Stade Messaoud Zougar; Referee: Mohamed Saïdi

7 March 2014 Round 22	CS Constantine	1–2	USM Alger	Constantine
16:00	Boulemdaïs 38'	Report	84' Chafaï; 90+3' Andria	Stadium: Stade Mohamed Hamlaoui; Referee: Mohamed Benouza

15 March 2014 Round 23	CRB Aïn Fakroun	0–2	CS Constantine	Aïn M'lila
15:00		Report	4' Hadiouche; 55' Boulemdaïs	Stadium: Stade des Frères Demane Debbih; Referee: Merzak Halalchi

18 March 2014 Round 24	CS Constantine	2–1	ES Sétif	Constantine
17:30	Zerdab 24'; E. Henaini 90'	Report	78' (pen.) Gourmi	Stadium: Stade Mohamed Hamlaoui; Referee: Mohamed Amine Bachir

26 April 2014 Round 25	CR Belouizdad	2–1	CS Constantine	Algiers
15:00	Bencherifa 30'; Bourakba 67'	Report	85' Boulemdaïs	Stadium: Stade 20 Août 1955; Referee: Djamel Haimoudi

3 May 2014 Round 26	CS Constantine	1–1	RC Arbaâ	Constantine
16:00	Boulemdaïs 38'	Report	5' Bougueroua	Stadium: Stade Mohamed Hamlaoui; Referee: Mohamed Saïdi

10 May 2014 Round 27	JSM Béjaïa	3–1	CS Constantine	Béjaïa
17:00	F. Benmansour 24'; T. Bouabta 58'; I. Tatem 88'	Report	29' Boulemdaïs	Stadium: Stade de l'Unité Maghrébine; Referee: Mustapha Bessiri

13 May 2014 Round 28	CS Constantine	1–1	ASO Chlef	Constantine
17:00	Berthé 41'	Report	55' Daham	Stadium: Stade Mohamed Hamlaoui; Referee: Farouk Mial

17 May 2014 Round 29	MC Alger	1–0	CS Constantine	Algiers
17:00	Hachoud 90+1'	Report		Stadium: Stade Omar Hamadi; Attendance: 0 (close doors); Referee: Mohamed Boukhalfa

24 May 2014 Round 30	CS Constantine	0–0	JS Kabylie	Constantine
17:00		Report		Stadium: Stade Mohamed Hamlaoui; Referee: Djamel Haimoudi

== Algerian Cup ==
6 December 2013 Round of 64	CS Constantine	1–0	JS Saoura	Constantine
17:00	Boulemdaïs 33'	Repport		Stadium: Stade Mohamed Hamlaoui

21 December 2013 Round of 32	CS Constantine	2–0	MO Béjaïa	Constantine
16:00	Sameur 78'; Boulemdaïs 80'	Report		Stadium: Stade Mohamed Hamlaoui; Referee: Sahraoui, Hadj Said, Abid

24 January 2014 Round of 16	ES Sétif	1–1 (0–3 p)	CS Constantine	Sétif
16:30	Demmou 76'	Report	42' Boulemdaïs	Stadium: Stade 8 Mai 1945; Referee: Haïmoudi, Etchiali, Omari

18 February 2014 Quarter-final	JSM Chéraga	2–1	CS Constantine	Algiers
17:30	Abdou 67' (pen.); Kolli 70'	Report	68' Allag	Stadium: Stade Omar Hamadi; Attendance: 10.000; Referee: Ghorbal, Serradj, Rezkane

== CAF Confederation Cup ==
=== Preliminary round ===
8 February 2014	ASN Nigelec (Niger)	2–0	(Algeria) CS Constantine	Niamey
16:00 UTC+1	Katakoré 63'; Nomao 85'	Report		Stadium: Stade Général Seyni Kountché; Referee: Moudo Jallow (Gambia)

15 February 2014	CS Constantine (Algeria)	4–1	(Niger) ASN Nigelec	Constantine
18:00 UTC+1	Issoufou 36' (o.g.); Henaini 44'; Sameur 54'; Bezzaz 90+7' (pen.)	Report	Talatou 90+4'	Stadium: Stade Mohamed Hamlaoui; Referee: Mounir Mabrouk (Morocco)

=== First round ===
28 February 2014	Red Lions (Liberia)	0–1	(Algeria) CS Constantine	Monrovia
16:00 UTC±0		Report	Zerdab 57'	Stadium: Antoinette Tubman Stadium; Referee: Louis Sanou (Burkina Faso)

9 March 2014	CS Constantine (Algeria)	2–0	(Liberia) Red Lions	Constantine
18:00 UTC+1	Yahia 10' (pen.); Zerdab 58'	Report		Stadium: Stade Mohamed Hamlaoui; Referee: Mohamed Said Kordi (Tunisia)

=== Second round ===
23 March 2014	CS Constantine (Algeria)	1–0	(Ivory Coast) ASEC Mimosas	Constantine
17:15 UTC+1	Sameur 82' (pen.)	Report		Stadium: Stade Mohamed Hamlaoui; Referee: Eric Otogo-Castane (Gabon)

30 March 2014	ASEC Mimosas (Ivory Coast)	6–0	(Algeria) CS Constantine	Abidjan
15:30 UTC±0	Fofana 26', 62'; Kangouté 48'; Foba 73', 89'; Loua 90+1'	Report		Stadium: Stade Félix Houphouët-Boigny; Referee: Janny Sikazwe (Zambia)

== Squad information ==
=== Playing statistics ===
No.	Pos	Nat	Player	Total		Ligue 1		Algerian Cup		Confederation Cup	
No.	Pos	Nat	Player	Apps	Goals	Apps	Goals	Apps	Goals	Apps	Goals
Goalkeepers
16	GK	(Algeria) ALG	Abderaouf Natèche	6	0	6	0	0	0	0	0
71	GK	(Algeria) ALG	Cédric Si Mohamed	24	0	24	0	0	0	0	0
Defenders
28	DF	(Algeria) ALG	Amer Belakhdar	13	0	13	0	0	0	0	0
23	DF	(Algeria) ALG	Adel Maïza	24	2	24	2	0	0	0	0
4	DF	(Mali) MLI	Ousmane Berthé	20	1	20	1	0	0	0	0
2	DF	(Algeria) ALG	Amine Boulahia	17	0	17	0	0	0	0	0
67	DF	(Algeria) ALG	Zine El-Abidine Sebbah	16	0	16	0	0	0	0	0
	DF	(Algeria) ALG	Rachid Bouhenna	10	0	10	0	0	0	0	0
	DF	(Algeria) ALG	Walid Dif	1	0	1	0	0	0	0	0
	DF	(Algeria) ALG	Sife Eddine Bounaâs	1	0	1	0	0	0	0	0
	DF	(Algeria) ALG	Hakem Ouzerdine	1	0	1	0	0	0	0	0
	DF	(Algeria) ALG	Oussama Achour	1	0	1	0	0	0	0	0
	DF	(Algeria) ALG	Monked Nini	2	0	2	0	0	0	0	0
	DF	(Algeria) ALG	Medjidi Zouaoui	1	0	1	0	0	0	0	0
Midfielders
77	MF	(Algeria) ALG	Yacine Bezzaz	16	2	16	2	0	0	0	0
10	MF	(Algeria) ALG	Samy Houri	8	1	8	1	0	0	0	0
20	MF	(Algeria) ALG	Fouad Allag	25	0	25	0	0	0	0	0
6	MF	(Cameroon) CMR	Gilles Ngomo	21	0	21	0	0	0	0	0
82	MF	(Algeria) ALG	Zahir Zerdab	22	2	22	2	0	0	0	0
21	MF	(Algeria) ALG	Hamza Ziad	9	0	9	0	0	0	0	0
8	MF	(Algeria) ALG	Karim Naït Yahia	15	1	15	1	0	0	0	0
31	MF	(Algeria) ALG	Abdelmadjid Benatia	7	1	7	1	0	0	0	0
18	MF	(Algeria) ALG	Abdelhak Sameur	25	2	25	2	0	0	0	0
	MF	(Algeria) ALG	Bilal Behloul	18	0	18	0	0	0	0	0
	MF	(Algeria) ALG	Brahim Bouhanèche	1	0	1	0	0	0	0	0
	MF	(Algeria) ALG	Naâmoune	2	0	2	0	0	0		
	MF	(Algeria) ALG	Youssef Laouafi	1	0	1	0	0	0	0	0
	MF	(Algeria) ALG	Kribaâ	1	0	1	0	0	0		
	MF	(Algeria) ALG	Cherif Kebaili	1	0	1	0	0	0	0	0
Forwards
24	FW	(Algeria) ALG	Eyemen Henaini	13	2	13	2	0	0	0	0
19	FW	(Algeria) ALG	Abdenour Hadiouche	19	1	19	1	0	0	0	0
11	FW	(Algeria) ALG	Mohamed Derrag	19	0	19	0	0	0	0	0
15	FW	(Algeria) ALG	Hamza Boulemdaïs	28	12	28	12	0	0	0	0
	FW	(Algeria) ALG	Réda Sayah	11	0	11	0	0	0	0	0
Players transferred out during the season
	MF	(Algeria) ALG	Antar Boucherit	12	2	12	2	0	0	0	0

Last updated: 10 October 2017
Source: fr.soccerway.com

== Transfers ==
=== In ===
Date	Pos	Player	From club	Transfer fee	Source
24 May 2013	GK	(Algeria) Cédric Si Mohamed	JSM Béjaïa	Undisclosed	
20 June 2013	FW	(Algeria) Mohamed Derrag	JSM Béjaïa	Undisclosed	
27 June 2013	DF	(Mali) Ousmane Berthé	(South Africa) Jomo Cosmos	Undisclosed	
27 June 2013	MF	(Algeria) Abdelmadjid Benatia	USM Bel-Abbès	Undisclosed	
29 June 2013	DF	(Algeria) Adel Maïza	JS Kabylie	Undisclosed	
1 July 2013	MF	(France) (Algeria) Samy Houri	(France) Fréjus Saint-Raphaël	Free transfer	
2 July 2013	FW	(Algeria) Eyemen Henaini	(France) Fréjus Saint-Raphaël	Free transfer	
3 July 2013	MF	(Algeria) Abdelhak Sameur	WA Tlemcen	Free transfer	
3 July 2013	DF	(Algeria) Zine El-Abidine Sebbah	MC Oran	Undisclosed	
29 July 2013	MF	(Algeria) Zahir Zerdab	(France) Rouen	Free transfer	
10 January 2014	MF	(Algeria) Réda Sayah	MC Alger	Loan one year	
13 January 2014	MF	(Algeria) Hamza Ziad	CA Batna	Undisclosed	
15 January 2014	DF	(France) (Algeria) Rachid Bouhenna	(France) Compiègne	Undisclosed	

=== Out ===
Date	Pos	Player	To club	Transfer fee	Source
6 December 2013	FW	(Algeria) Mohamed Dahmane	CR Belouizdad	Free transfer	
12 January 2014	MF	(Algeria) Antar Boucherit	MC Alger	Undisclosed	
