= CS Constantine in African football =

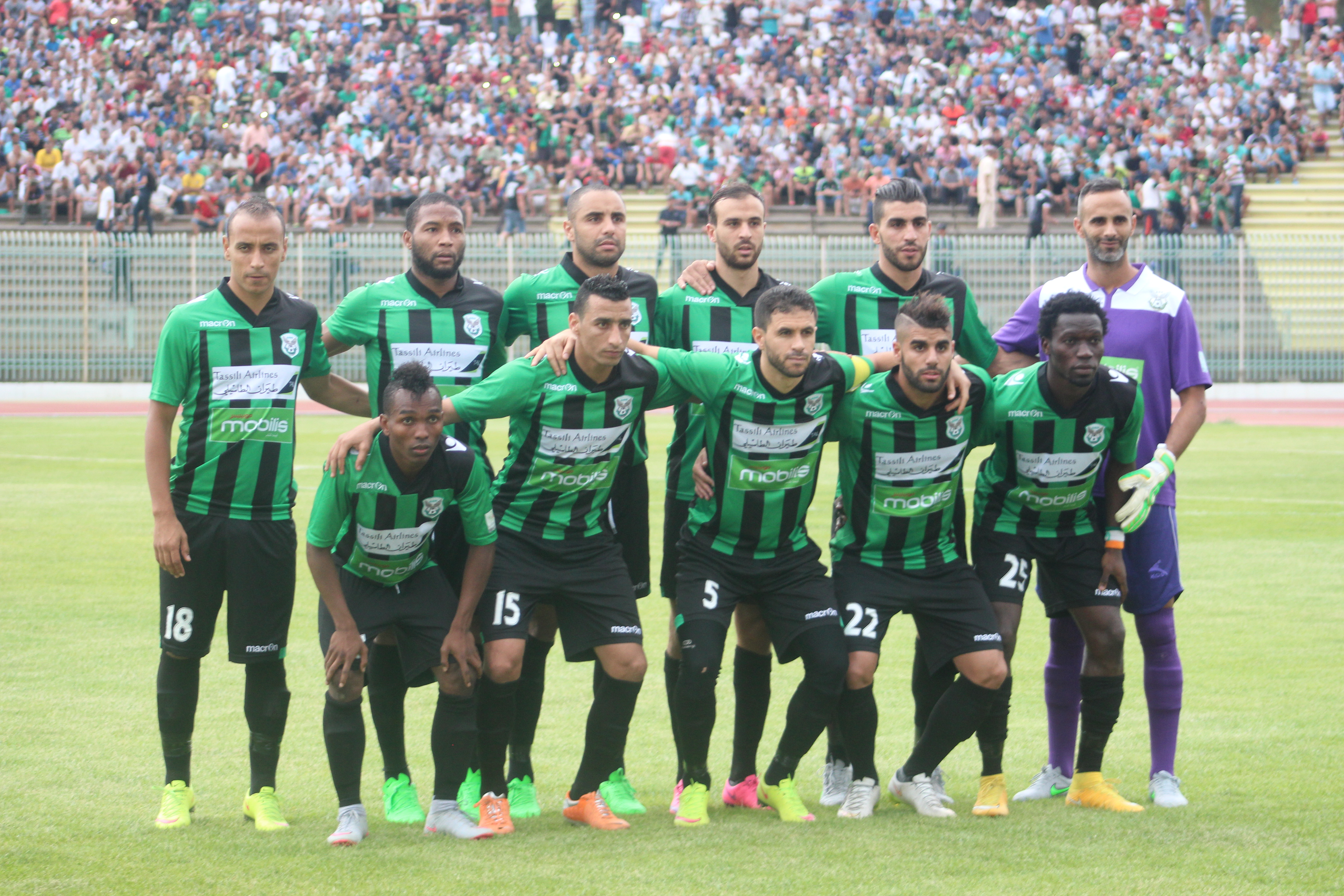
- CS Constantine 2015–16 with From Left to Right: Stand Up : Remache - Djeghbala - Aksas - Bencherifa - Boulemdaïs - Si Mohamed. Sitting Voavy - Boucherit - Bezzaz (C) - Djellilahine - Koné.
- Club: CS Constantine
- Most appearances: Nasreddine Zaâlani 12
- Top scorer: Zakaria Benchaâ 6
- First entry: 1998 CAF Champions League
- Latest entry: 2024–25 CAF Confederation Cup

CS Constantine, an Algerian professional association football club, has gained entry to Confederation of African Football (CAF) competitions on several occasions. They have represented Algeria in the Champions League on two occasions, and the Confederation Cup on two occasions.

== History ==
CS Constantine whose team has regularly taken part in Confederation of African Football (CAF) competitions. Qualification for Algerian clubs is determined by a team's performance in its domestic league and cup competitions, CS Constantine have regularly qualified for the primary African competition, the African Cup, by winning the Ligue Professionnelle 1. CS Constantine have also achieved African qualification via the Algerian Cup and have played in the CAF Confederation Cup. The first continental participation was in 1998 in the CAF Champions League, and the first match was against AS Douanes and ended with a loss 2–1, As for the biggest defeat result was firstly in 2014 against ASN Nigelec, and the secondly in 2016 against Nasarawa United 4–1, and biggest loss in 2014 against ASEC Mimosas 6–0. so that CS Constantine was absent from the African competitions until 2014 Where did it participate in the CAF Confederation Cup.

On 8 February 2014 witnessed a historic event when CS Constantine played two matches on the same day, the first in the Ligue Professionnelle 1 against MO Béjaïa and the second against ASN Nigelec in Niger and in both of them they were defeated by the same score 2–0. the Algerian Football Federation refused to postpone the matches of the championship for the Algerian clubs participating in African competitions because the FAF does not intend to end up with late matches that would disrupt the progress of a calendar allegedly tight because of the 2014 FIFA World Cup, it is for this reason that it strongly encouraged the Algerian clubs engaged in African competitions 2014 to withdraw.

After winning the Ligue Professionnelle 1 title CS Constantine returned to the CAF Champions League after 20 years of absence, Qualifying for the group stage was a bit easy after winning against GAMTEL and Vipers putting him in group C with Club Africain, TP Mazembe and Ismaily. where CS Constantine ranked second to face in the quarter-finals the defending champions Espérance de Tunis to defeat 3–6 on aggregate.

== CAF competitions ==
CS Constantine results in CAF competition
Season	Competition	Round	Opposition	Home	Away	Aggregate	Ref.
1998	Champions League	First round	(Senegal) AS Douanes	0–0	1–2	1–2	
2014	Confederation Cup	Preliminary round	(Niger) ASN Nigelec	4–1	0–2	4–3	
2014	Confederation Cup	First round	(Liberia) Red Lions	2–0	1–0	3–0	
2014	Confederation Cup	Second round	(Ivory Coast) ASEC Mimosas	1–0	0–6	1–6	
2016	Confederation Cup	First round	(Nigeria) Nasarawa United	4–1	0–1	4–2	
2016	Confederation Cup	Second round	(Egypt) Misr Lel Makkasa	1–0	1–3	2–3	
2018–19	Champions League						
2018–19	Champions League	Preliminary round	(The Gambia) GAMTEL	0–0	1–0	1–0	
2018–19	Champions League	First round	(Uganda) Vipers	1–0	2–0	3–0	
2018–19	Champions League	Group stage	(Tunisia) Club Africain	0–1	1–0	2nd place	
2018–19	Champions League	Group stage	(Democratic Republic of the Congo) TP Mazembe	3–0	0–2	2nd place	
2018–19	Champions League	Group stage	(Egypt) Ismaily	3–2	1–1	2nd place	
2018–19	Champions League	Quarter-finals	(Tunisia) Espérance de Tunis	2–3	1–3	3–6	
2023–24	Champions League	First round	(Tunisia) ES Sahel	0–2	0–1	0–3	
2024–25	Confederation Cup	First round	(Rwanda) Police FC	2–0	2–1	4–1	
2024–25	Confederation Cup	Second round	(Ghana) Nsoatreman	1–0	2–0	3–0	
2024–25	Confederation Cup	Group stage	(Tunisia) CS Sfaxien	3–0	2–1	2nd place	
2024–25	Confederation Cup	Group stage	(Tanzania) Simba	2–1	0–2	2nd place	
2024–25	Confederation Cup	Group stage	(Angola) Bravos do Maquis	4–0	2–3	2nd place	
2024–25	Confederation Cup	Quarter-finals	(Algeria) USM Alger	1–1	1–1	2–2 (4-3 p)	
2024–25	Confederation Cup	Semi-finals	(Morocco) RS Berkane	1–0	0–4	1–4	

== Non-CAF competitions ==
CS Constantine results in Non-CAF competition
Season	Competition	Round	Opposition	Home	Away	Aggregate
2019–20	Arab Club Champions Cup	First round	(Bahrain) Al-Muharraq	3–1	0–2	3–3 (a)

== Statistics ==
=== By season ===
Information correct as of 27 April 2025.
Key

- Pld = Played
- W = Games won
- D = Games drawn
- L = Games lost
- F = Goals for
- A = Goals against
- Grp = Group stage
- PR = Preliminary round
- R1 = First round
- R2 = Second round
- SR16 = Second Round of 16
- R16 = Round of 16
- QF = Quarter-final
- SF = Semi-final

Key to colours and symbols:

W	Winners
RU	Runners-up

CS Constantine record in African football by season
Season	Competition	Pld	W	D	L	GF	GA	GD	Round
1998	CAF Champions League	2	0	1	1	1	2	−1	R1
2014	CAF Confederation Cup	6	4	0	2	8	9	−1	R2
2016	CAF Confederation Cup	4	2	0	2	6	5	+1	R2
2018–19	CAF Champions League	12	6	2	4	15	12	+3	QF
2023–24	CAF Champions League	2	0	0	2	0	3	−3	R1
2024–25	CAF Confederation Cup	14	9	2	3	22	13	+9	SF
Total		40	21	5	14	52	44	+8	

=== By competition ===
==== In Africa ====
As of 27 April 2025:

CAF competitions
Competition	Seasons	Played	Won	Drawn	Lost	Goals For	Goals Against	Last season played
Champions League	3	16	6	3	7	16	17	2023–24
CAF Confederation Cup	3	24	15	2	7	36	27	2024–25
Total	6	40	21	5	14	52	44	

==== Non-CAF competitions ====
As of 17 September 2019:

Non-CAF competitions
Competition	Seasons	Played	Won	Drawn	Lost	Goals For	Goals Against	Last season played
Arab Champions League	1	2	1	0	1	3	3	2019–20
Total	1	2	1	0	1	3	3	

== Statistics by country ==
Statistics correct as of game against RS Berkane on April 27, 2025

=== CAF competitions ===
Country	Club	P	W	D	L	GF	GA	GD
Algeria	CS Constantine	2	0	2	0	2	2	+0
Subtotal		2	0	2	0	2	2	+0
Angola	Bravos do Maquis	2	1	0	1	6	3	+3
Subtotal		2	1	0	1	6	3	+3
Ivory Coast	ASEC Mimosas	2	1	0	1	1	6	−5
Subtotal		2	1	0	1	1	6	−5
Liberia	Red Lions	2	2	0	0	3	0	+3
Subtotal		2	2	0	0	3	0	+3
Niger	ASN Nigelec	2	1	0	1	4	3	+1
Subtotal		2	1	0	1	4	3	+1
Nigeria	Nasarawa United	2	1	0	1	4	2	+2
Subtotal		2	1	0	1	4	2	+2
Uganda	Vipers	2	2	0	0	3	0	+3
Subtotal		2	2	0	0	3	0	+3
(Democratic Republic of the Congo) DR Congo	TP Mazembe	2	1	0	1	3	2	+1
Subtotal		2	1	0	1	3	2	+1
Egypt	Ismaily	2	1	1	0	4	3	+1
Egypt	Misr Lel Makkasa	2	1	0	1	2	3	−1
Subtotal		4	2	1	1	6	6	0
(The Gambia) Gambia	GAMTEL	2	1	1	0	1	0	+1
Subtotal		2	1	1	0	1	0	+1
Ghana	Nsoatreman	2	2	0	0	3	0	+3
Subtotal		2	2	0	0	3	0	+3
Morocco	RS Berkane	2	1	0	1	1	4	−3
Subtotal		2	1	0	1	1	4	−3
Rwanda	Police FC	2	2	0	0	4	1	+3
Subtotal		2	2	0	0	4	1	+3
Senegal	AS Douanes	2	0	1	1	1	2	−1
Subtotal		2	0	1	1	1	2	−1
Tanzania	Simba	2	1	0	1	2	3	+0
Subtotal		2	1	0	1	2	3	−1
Tunisia	Club Africain	2	1	0	1	1	1	0
Tunisia	Espérance de Tunis	2	0	0	2	3	6	−3
Tunisia	ES Sahel	2	0	0	2	0	3	−3
Tunisia	CS Sfaxien	2	2	0	0	4	0	+4
Subtotal		8	3	0	5	8	10	−2
Total		40	21	5	14	52	44	+8

=== Non-CAF competitions ===
Result summary by country
Country	Pld	W	D	L	GF	GA	GD
Bahrain	2	1	0	1	3	3	+0
Total	2	1	0	1	3	3	+0

== African competitions goals ==
Statistics correct as of game against RS Berkane on April 27, 2025

List of CS Constantine players with 2 or more goals
Position	Player	TOTAL	CCL	CCC
1	(Algeria) Zakaria Benchaâ	6	–	6
2	(Algeria) Brahim Dib	3	–	3
=	(Algeria) Mounder Temine	3	–	3
=	(Algeria) Abdennour Belhocini	3	–	3
5	(Algeria) Ismaïl Belkacemi	2	2	–
=	(Nigeria) Tosin Omoyele	2	–	2
=	(Algeria) Dadi El Hocine Mouaki	2	–	2
=	(Algeria) Adil Djabout	2	2	–
=	(Algeria) Nassim Yettou	2	2	–
=	(Republic of the Congo) Dylan Bahamboula	2	2	–
=	(Algeria) Nasreddine Zaâlani	2	2	–
=	(Algeria) Yacine Bezzaz	2	–	2
=	(Algeria) Mourad Meghni	2	–	2
=	(Madagascar) Paulin Voavy	2	–	2
=	(Algeria) Zahir Zerdab	2	–	2
=	(Algeria) Abdelhakim Sameur	2	–	2
Totals		52	16	36

=== Two goals one match ===
N	Date	Player	Match	Score
1	13 Sep 2024	Zakaria Benchaâ	Nsoatreman – CS Constantine	0–2
2	12 Jan 2025	Zakaria Benchaâ	CS Constantine – CS Sfaxien	3–0

== Non-CAF competitions goals ==
P	Player	Goals
1	(Algeria) Ismaïl Belkacemi	1

P	Player	Goals
=	(Algeria) Abdelhakim Amokrane	1

P	Player	Goals
=	(Algeria) Adil Djabout	1

== List of All-time appearances ==
This List of All-time appearances for CS Constantine in African competitions contains football players who have played for CS Constantine in African football competitions and have managed to accrue 10 or more appearances.

Gold Still playing competitive football in CS Constantine. (Note: Statistics correct as of game against RS Berkane on April 27, 2025.)

#	Name	Position	CL1	CCC	SC	TOTAL	Date of first cap	Debut against	Date of last cap	Final match against
1	(Algeria) Houari Baouche	LB	14	–	–	14	17 Aug 2024	Police FC	—	—
=	(Algeria) Oussama Meddahi	RB	14	–	–	14	17 Aug 2024	Police FC	—	—
=	(Algeria) Mohamed Benchaira	DM	14	–	–	14	17 Aug 2024	Police FC	—	—
=	(Algeria) Zakaria Benchaâ	ST	14	–	–	14	17 Aug 2024	Police FC	—	—
=	(Algeria) Brahim Dib	AM	14	–	–	14	17 Aug 2024	Police FC	—	—
6	(Algeria) Messala Merbah	DM	13	–	–	13	17 Aug 2024	Police FC	—	—
7	(Algeria) Walid Bencherifa	LB / AM	8	4	–	12	13 Mar 2016	Nasarawa United	13 Apr 2019	Espérance de Tunis
=	(Algeria) Nasreddine Zaâlani	CB	12	–	–	12	27 Nov 2018	GAMTEL	13 Apr 2019	Espérance de Tunis
9	(Algeria) Chamseddine Rahmani	GK	11	–	–	11	27 Nov 2018	GAMTEL	6 Apr 2019	Espérance de Tunis
=	(Algeria) Houcine Benayada	RB / CB / RM	11	–	–	11	27 Nov 2018	GAMTEL	13 Apr 2019	Espérance de Tunis
=	(Algeria) Islam Chahrour	CB / RB / LB	11	–	–	11	27 Nov 2018	GAMTEL	13 Apr 2019	Espérance de Tunis
12	(Algeria) Yassine Salhi	LB	10	–	–	10	27 Nov 2018	GAMTEL	13 Apr 2019	Espérance de Tunis
=	(Algeria) Fouad Haddad	DM	10	–	–	10	5 Dec 2018	GAMTEL	13 Apr 2019	Espérance de Tunis
=	(Algeria) Achraf Boudrama	CB	11	–	–	11	13 Sep 2024	Nsoatreman	—	—
=	(Algeria) Kaddour Beldjilali	AM	10	–	–	10	27 Nov 2018	GAMTEL	13 Apr 2019	Espérance de Tunis
=	(Algeria) Dadi El Hocine Mouaki	LW	10	–	–	10	17 Aug 2024	Police FC	—	—
=	(Algeria) Sid Ali Lamri	CM	10	–	–	10	5 Dec 2018	GAMTEL	16 Mar 2019	TP Mazembe
=	(Algeria) Ismail Belkacemi	ST	10	–	–	10	27 Nov 2018	GAMTEL	16 Mar 2019	TP Mazembe
