= List of football clubs in Sudan =

The following is an incomplete list of association football clubs based in Sudan. For a complete list see Category:Football clubs in Sudan

== A ==
- Al Khartoum SC
- Al Mirghani ESC
- Al Nile SC (Al-Hasahesa)
- Al Rabta
- Al-Ahli (Atbara)
- Al-Ahli Khartoum
- Al-Ahli SC (Wad Madani)
- Al-Ahly Shendi
- Al-Hilal Club (Omdurman)
- Al-Hilal SC (Port Sudan)
- Al-Hilal SC Kadougli
- Al-Ittihad SC (Wad Madani)
- Al-Merreikh (Al-Fasher)
- Al-Merreikh Al-Thagher
- Al-Nsoor
- Al-Shamali AC
- Alamal SC Atbara

== B ==
- Burri Khartoum

== H ==
- Hay el-Arab SC

== J ==
- Jazeerat Al-Feel SC

== M ==
- Merrikh
- Mourada

== T ==
- Taka Kassala
