= 2014 CAF Confederation Cup =

International football competition in Africa

2014 Orange CAF Confederation Cup

Tournament details
- Dates: 7 February – 6 December 2014
- Teams: 53+8 (from 42 associations)

Final positions
- Champions: (Egypt) Al-Ahly (1st title)
- Runners-up: (Ivory Coast) Séwé Sport

Tournament statistics
- Matches played: 134
- Goals scored: 285 (2.13 per match)
- Top scorer(s): (Republic of the Congo) Kader Bidimbou (Zimbabwe) Kudakwashe Musharu (Ivory Coast) Koffi Foba (6 goals each)

The 2014 CAF Confederation Cup (also known as the 2014 Orange CAF Confederation Cup for sponsorship reasons) was the 11th edition of the CAF Confederation Cup, Africa's secondary club football competition organized by the Confederation of African Football (CAF). The defending champions CS Sfaxien did not enter the tournament as they qualified for the 2014 CAF Champions League and reached the group stage.

In the final, Al-Ahly of Egypt defeated Séwé Sport of Côte d'Ivoire on the away goals rule after drawing 2–2 on aggregate, to win their first title, and a record-extending 19th overall African title (having already won eight African Champions Cup/CAF Champions League titles, six CAF Super Cup titles and four African Cup Winners' Cup titles). They earned the right to play in the 2015 CAF Super Cup.

== Association team allocation ==
All 56 CAF member associations may enter the CAF Confederation Cup, with the 12 highest ranked associations according to their CAF 5-year ranking eligible to enter two teams in the competition. The title holders could also enter if they had not already qualified for the CAF Champions League or CAF Confederation Cup. As a result, theoretically a maximum of 69 teams could enter the tournament (plus eight teams eliminated from the CAF Champions League which enter the play-off round) – although this level has never been reached.

For the 2014 CAF Confederation Cup, the CAF used the 2008–2012 CAF 5-year ranking, which calculated points for each entrant association based on their clubs’ performance over those 5 years in the CAF Champions League and CAF Confederation Cup. The criteria for points were the following:

	CAF Champions League	CAF Confederation Cup
Winner	5 points	4 points
Runner-up	4 points	3 points
Losing semi-finalists	3 points	2 points
3rd place in groups	2 points	1 point
4th place in groups	1 point	1 point

The points were multiplied by a coefficient according to the year as follows:

- 2012 – 5
- 2011 – 4
- 2010 – 3
- 2009 – 2
- 2008 – 1

== Teams ==
The following teams entered the competition. Teams in bold received a bye to the first round. The other teams entered the preliminary round.

Associations are shown according to their 2008–2012 CAF 5-year ranking – those with a ranking score have their rank and score indicated.

Association	Team	Qualifying method
Associations eligible to enter two teams (Ranked 1–12)
Tunisia (1st – 85 pts)	**Étoile du Sahel**	2012–13 Tunisian Ligue Professionnelle 1 third place
Tunisia (1st – 85 pts)	**CA Bizertin**	2013 Tunisian Cup winner
Egypt (2nd – 70 pts)	**Ismaily**	2010–11 Egyptian Premier League third place
Egypt (2nd – 70 pts)	**Wadi Degla**	2013 Egypt Cup runner-up
Nigeria (3rd – 63 pts)	**Bayelsa United**	2013 Nigeria Premier League third place
Nigeria (3rd – 63 pts)	**Warri Wolves**	2013 Nigerian FA Cup runner-up
Sudan (4th – 54 pts)	**Al-Ahly Shendi**	2013 Sudan Premier League third place
Sudan (4th – 54 pts)	Al-Ahli Atbara	2013 Sudan Premier League fourth place
Morocco (5th – 53 pts)	**MAS Fez**	2012–13 Botola third place
Morocco (5th – 53 pts)	Difaâ El Jadidi	2013 Coupe du Trône winner
(Democratic Republic of the Congo) Congo DR (6th – 48 pts)	CS Don Bosco	2013 Linafoot third place
(Democratic Republic of the Congo) Congo DR (6th – 48 pts)	MK Etanchéité	2013 Coupe du Congo winner
Algeria (7th – 40 pts)	CS Constantine (one entrant only)	2012–13 Algerian Ligue Professionnelle 1 third place
Mali (8th – 31 pts)	**Djoliba**	2012–13 Malian Première Division third place
Mali (8th – 31 pts)	Club Olympique de Bamako	2012–13 Malian Première Division fourth place
(Republic of the Congo) Congo (9th – 20 pts)	AS Kondzo	2013 Congo Premier League third place
(Republic of the Congo) Congo (9th – 20 pts)	CARA Brazzaville	2013 Congo Premier League fourth place
Angola (10th – 18 pts)	Petro de Luanda	2013 Taça de Angola winner
Angola (10th – 18 pts)	Desportivo da Huíla	2013 Taça de Angola runner-up
Cameroon (11th – 12 pts)	Union Douala	2013 Elite One third place
Cameroon (11th – 12 pts)	Yong Sports Academy	2013 Cameroonian Cup winner
Ghana (12th – 11 pts)	Ebusua Dwarfs	2012–13 Ghanaian Premier League third place
Ghana (12th – 11 pts)	Medeama	2012–13 Ghanaian FA Cup winner
Associations eligible to enter one team
Zimbabwe (13th – 8 pts)	How Mine	2013 Cup of Zimbabwe runner-up
Zambia (14th – 7 pts)	**ZESCO United**	2013 Zambian Premier League runner-up
Ivory Coast (T-15th – 6 pts)	**ASEC Mimosas**	2013 Coupe de Côte d'Ivoire de football winner
Libya (T-15th – 6 pts)	Al-Ahli Tripoli	2013–14 Libyan Premier League group A leader after round 7
Niger (17th – 3 pts)	ASN Nigelec	2013 Niger Cup winner
Botswana	Gaborone United	2013 Mascom Top 8 Cup winner
Burkina Faso	AS SONABEL	2013 Coupe du Faso runner-up
Burundi	Académie Tchité	2013 Burundian Cup winner
Chad	ASLAD	2013 Chad Cup winner
Equatorial Guinea	The Panthers	2013 Equatoguinean Cup winner
Ethiopia	Defence Force	2013 Ethiopian Cup winner
Gabon	CF Mounana	2013 Coupe du Gabon Interclubs winner
(The Gambia) Gambia	Gamtel	2013 Gambian Cup winner
Guinea	CI Kamsar	2013 Guinée Coupe Nationale runner-up
Guinea-Bissau	Estrela de Cantanhez	2013 Taça Nacional da Guiné Bissau winner
Kenya	AFC Leopards	2013 FKF President's Cup winner
Liberia	Red Lions	2013 Liberian Cup runner-up
Madagascar	ASSM Elgeco Plus	2013 Coupe de Madagascar winner
Mozambique	Ferroviário da Beira	2013 Taça de Moçambique winner
Namibia	African Stars	2013 NFA Cup winner
Rwanda	AS Kigali	2013 Rwandan Cup winner
Senegal	ASC Diaraf	2013 Senegal FA Cup winner
Seychelles	St Michel United	2013 Seychelles FA Cup winner
Sierra Leone	RSLAF	2013 Sierra Leone National Premier League runner-up
South Africa	SuperSport United	2012–13 Nedbank Cup runner-up
South Sudan	Al-Malakia	2013 South Sudan National Cup winner
Tanzania	Azam	2012–13 Tanzanian Premier League runner-up
Togo	AS Douanes Lomé	2013 Togolese Championnat National runner-up
Uganda	Victoria University	2013 Ugandan Cup winner
Zanzibar	Chuoni	2012–13 Zanzibar Premier League runner-up

Notes

1. Egypt (EGY): The 2012–13 Egyptian Premier League third place would originally represent Egypt in this tournament, but due to its cancellation, the 2010–11 Egyptian Premier League third place (last completed season) was selected to represent Egypt.

In addition to the teams above, the following eight teams entered the play-off round.

Team	Qualifying method
(Egypt) Al-Ahly	Losers of the 2014 CAF Champions League second round
(Mali) AS Real Bamako	Losers of the 2014 CAF Champions League second round
(Ivory Coast) Séwé Sport	Losers of the 2014 CAF Champions League second round
(Guinea) Horoya	Losers of the 2014 CAF Champions League second round
(Cameroon) Coton Sport	Losers of the 2014 CAF Champions League second round
(Republic of the Congo) AC Léopards	Losers of the 2014 CAF Champions League second round
(South Africa) Kaizer Chiefs	Losers of the 2014 CAF Champions League second round
(Zambia) Nkana	Losers of the 2014 CAF Champions League second round

The following associations did not enter a team:

- Benin
- Cape Verde
- Central African Republic
- Comoros
- Djibouti
- Eritrea
- Lesotho
- Malawi
- Mauritania
- Mauritius
- Réunion
- São Tomé and Príncipe
- Somalia
- (Eswatini) Swaziland

== Schedule ==
The schedule of the competition was as follows (all draws held at CAF headquarters in Cairo, Egypt unless otherwise stated).

Phase	Round	Draw date	First leg	Second leg
Qualifying	Preliminary round	16 December 2013 (Marrakesh, Morocco)	7–9 February 2014	14–16 February 2014
Qualifying	First round	16 December 2013 (Marrakesh, Morocco)	28 February–2 March 2014	7–9 March 2014
Qualifying	Second round	16 December 2013 (Marrakesh, Morocco)	21–23 March 2014	28–30 March 2014
Qualifying	Play-off round	1 April 2014	18–20 April 2014	25–27 April 2014
Group stage	Matchday 1	29 April 2014	16–18 May 2014	
Group stage	Matchday 2	29 April 2014	23–25 May 2014	
Group stage	Matchday 3	29 April 2014	6–8 June 2014	
Group stage	Matchday 4	29 April 2014	25–27 July 2014	
Group stage	Matchday 5	29 April 2014	8–10 August 2014	
Group stage	Matchday 6	29 April 2014	22–24 August 2014	
Knock-out stage	Semi-finals	29 April 2014	19–21 September 2014	26–28 September 2014
Knock-out stage	Final	29 April 2014	28–30 November 2014	5–7 December 2014

== Qualifying rounds ==
The draw for the preliminary, first and second qualifying rounds was held on 16 December 2013.

Qualification ties were played on a home-and-away two-legged basis. If the sides were level on aggregate after the second leg, the away goals rule was applied, and if still level, the tie proceeded directly to a penalty shoot-out (no extra time was played).

=== Preliminary round ===
Team 1	Agg.	Team 2	1st leg	2nd leg
Al-Malakia (South Sudan)	1–5	(Republic of the Congo) CARA Brazzaville	0–1	1–4
AFC Leopards (Kenya)	4–1	(Ethiopia) Defence Force	2–0	2–1
SuperSport United (South Africa)	3–0	(Botswana) Gaborone United	2–0	1–0
AS Kigali (Rwanda)	2–1	(Burundi) Académie Tchité	1–0	1–1
Difaâ El Jadidi (Morocco)	1–0	(Burkina Faso) AS SONABEL	1–0	0–0
RSLAF (Sierra Leone)	0–3	(The Gambia) Gamtel	0–1	0–2
The Panthers (Equatorial Guinea)	1–4	(Ghana) Medeama	1–2	0–2
Azam (Tanzania)	1–2	(Mozambique) Ferroviário da Beira	1–0	0–2
St Michel United (Seychelles)	3–3 (7–6 p)	(Madagascar) ASSM Elgeco Plus	2–1	1–2
How Mine (Zimbabwe)	6–1	(Zanzibar) Chuoni	4–0	2–1
AS Kondzo (Republic of the Congo)	3–3 (a)	(Cameroon) Yong Sports Academy	2–0	1–3
ASN Nigelec (Niger)	3–4	(Algeria) CS Constantine	2–0	1–4
Red Lions (Liberia)	w/o	(Guinea-Bissau) Estrela de Cantanhez	—	—
Al-Ahli Tripoli (Libya)	1–2	(Mali) Club Olympique de Bamako	1–1	0–1
Al-Ahli Atbara (Sudan)	1–1 (a)	(Democratic Republic of the Congo) MK Etanchéité	1–1	0–0
African Stars (Namibia)	2–3	(Angola) Petro de Luanda	2–0	0–3
Ebusua Dwarfs (Ghana)	1–0	(Senegal) ASC Diaraf	1–0	0–0
AS Douanes Lomé (Togo)	3–1	(Guinea) CI Kamsar	2–0	1–1
CS Don Bosco (Democratic Republic of the Congo)	3–1	(Uganda) Victoria University	3–0	0–1
Union Douala (Cameroon)	4–2	(Chad) ASLAD	3–0	1–2
CF Mounana (Gabon)	3–4	(Angola) Desportivo da Huíla	3–1	0–3

Notes

1. Red Lions advanced to the first round after Estrela de Cantanhez withdrew.

=== First round ===
Team 1	Agg.	Team 2	1st leg	2nd leg
CARA Brazzaville (Republic of the Congo)	1–3	(Tunisia) Étoile du Sahel	1–0	0–3
SuperSport United (South Africa)	4–2	(Kenya) AFC Leopards	2–0	2–2
AS Kigali (Rwanda)	1–1 (5–4 p)	(Sudan) Al-Ahly Shendi	1–0	0–1
Gamtel (The Gambia)	0–6	(Morocco) Difaâ El Jadidi	0–2	0–4
Medeama (Ghana)	4–2	(Morocco) MAS Fez	3–0	1–2
Ferroviário da Beira (Mozambique)	0–1	(Zambia) ZESCO United	0–0	0–1
How Mine (Zimbabwe)	6–4	(Seychelles) St Michel United	5–1	1–3
AS Kondzo (Republic of the Congo)	0–2	(Nigeria) Bayelsa United	0–0	0–2
Red Lions (Liberia)	0–3	(Algeria) CS Constantine	0–1	0–2
Club Olympique de Bamako (Mali)	1–3	(Ivory Coast) ASEC Mimosas	0–2	1–1
MK Etanchéité (Democratic Republic of the Congo)	0–0 (3–4 p)	(Egypt) Ismaily	0–0	0–0
Ebusua Dwarfs (Ghana)	2–4	(Angola) Petro de Luanda	2–0	0–4
AS Douanes Lomé (Togo)	1–3	(Egypt) Wadi Degla	1–1	0–2
CS Don Bosco (Democratic Republic of the Congo)	2–2 (a)	(Mali) Djoliba	2–1	0–1
Union Douala (Cameroon)	3–4	(Nigeria) Warri Wolves	2–3	1–1
Desportivo da Huíla (Angola)	0–3	(Tunisia) CA Bizertin	0–1	0–2

=== Second round ===
Team 1	Agg.	Team 2	1st leg	2nd leg
Étoile du Sahel (Tunisia)	5–1	(South Africa) SuperSport United	1–0	4–1
AS Kigali (Rwanda)	1–3	(Morocco) Difaâ El Jadidi	1–0	0–3
Medeama (Ghana)	2–1	(Zambia) ZESCO United	2–0	0–1
How Mine (Zimbabwe)	2–3	(Nigeria) Bayelsa United	2–1	0–2
CS Constantine (Algeria)	1–6	(Ivory Coast) ASEC Mimosas	1–0	0–6
Ismaily (Egypt)	0–1	(Angola) Petro de Luanda	0–0	0–1
Wadi Degla (Egypt)	2–2 (2–3 p)	(Mali) Djoliba	2–0	0–2
Warri Wolves (Nigeria)	1–2	(Tunisia) CA Bizertin	0–0	1–2

=== Play-off round ===
The draw for the play-off round was held on 1 April 2014. The winners of the Confederation Cup second round were drawn against the losers of the Champions League second round, with the former hosting the second leg.

Team 1	Agg.	Team 2	1st leg	2nd leg
Al-Ahly (Egypt)	2–2 (a)	(Morocco) Difaâ El Jadidi	1–0	1–2
AS Real Bamako (Mali)	2–1	(Mali) Djoliba	2–1	0–0
AC Léopards (Republic of the Congo)	2–2 (5–4 p)	(Ghana) Medeama	2–0	0–2
Kaizer Chiefs (South Africa)	1–3	(Ivory Coast) ASEC Mimosas	1–2	0–1
Coton Sport (Cameroon)	4–3	(Angola) Petro de Luanda	2–1	2–2
Horoya (Guinea)	0–1	(Tunisia) Étoile du Sahel	0–0	0–1
Séwé Sport (Ivory Coast)	3–0	(Nigeria) Bayelsa United	2–0	1–0
Nkana (Zambia)	1–1 (a)	(Tunisia) CA Bizertin	0–0	1–1

== Group stage ==
Location of teams of the 2014 CAF Confederation Cup group stage.
Group A
Group B

The draw for the group stage was held on 29 April 2014. The eight teams were drawn into two groups of four. Each group was played on a home-and-away round-robin basis. The winners and runners-up of each group advanced to the semi-finals.

Tiebreakers

The teams are ranked according to points (3 points for a win, 1 point for a draw, 0 points for a loss). If tied on points, tiebreakers are applied in the following order:

1. Number of points obtained in games between the teams concerned
2. Goal difference in games between the teams concerned
3. Away goals scored in games between the teams concerned
4. Goal difference in all games
5. Goals scored in all games

=== Group A ===
Team	Pld	W	D	L	GF	GA	GD	Pts	LEO	COT	RBA	MIM
(Republic of the Congo) AC Léopards	6	3	2	1	11	4	+7	11 (Note: Tiebreakers: AC Léopards and Coton Sport are ranked on head-to-head record.)		0–0	1–2	4–1
(Cameroon) Coton Sport	6	3	2	1	8	9	−1	11	0–4		2–1	2–1
(Mali) AS Real Bamako	6	1	3	2	6	7	−1	6	1–2	1–1		1–1
(Ivory Coast) ASEC Mimosas	6	0	3	3	5	10	−5	3	0–0	2–3	0–0	

Legend: Blue = home team win; Yellow = draw; Red = away team win.

=== Group B ===
Team	Pld	W	D	L	GF	GA	GD	Pts	AHL	SEW	NKA	ESS
(Egypt) Al-Ahly	6	2	3	1	5	3	+2	9 (Note: Tiebreakers: Al-Ahly and Séwé Sport are ranked on head-to-head record.)		1–0	2–0	0–0
(Ivory Coast) Séwé Sport	6	2	3	1	7	4	+3	9	1–1		3–0	1–1
(Zambia) Nkana	6	2	1	3	9	13	−4	7	1–0	1–1		4–3
(Tunisia) Étoile du Sahel	6	1	3	2	9	10	−1	6	1–1	0–1	4–3	

Legend: Blue = home team win; Yellow = draw; Red = away team win.

== Knock-out stage ==
Knock-out ties were played on a home-and-away two-legged basis. If the sides were level on aggregate after the second leg, the away goals rule was applied, and if still level, the tie proceeded directly to a penalty shoot-out (no extra time was played).

=== Bracket ===
Semi-Finals
1	(Ivory Coast) Séwé Sport	1	0	1
4	(Republic of the Congo) AC Léopards	0	0	0
3	(Cameroon) Coton Sport	0	1	1
2	(Egypt) Al-Ahly	1	2	3

Final
(Ivory Coast) Séwé Sport	2	0	2
(Egypt) Al-Ahly (a)	1	1	2

=== Semi-finals ===
In the semi-finals, the group A winners played the group B runners-up, and the group B winners played the group A runners-up, with the group winners hosting the second leg.

Team 1	Agg.	Team 2	1st leg	2nd leg
Séwé Sport (Ivory Coast)	1–0	(Republic of the Congo) AC Léopards	1–0	0–0
Coton Sport (Cameroon)	1–3	(Egypt) Al-Ahly	0–1	1–2

=== Final ===
In the final, the order of legs was decided by a draw, held after the group stage draw.

29 November 2014
15:00 UTC±0

Séwé (Ivory Coast)	2–1	(Egypt) Al-Ahly
C.Koffi 25' (pen.); Gboze 82'	Report	Trezeguet 59'

Stade Robert Champroux, Abidjan
Attendance: 5,000
Referee: Eric Otogo-Castane (Gabon)
6 December 2014
18:00 UTC+2

Al-Ahly (Egypt)	1-0	(Ivory Coast) Séwé
Emad Moteab 90+6'	Report

Cairo International Stadium, Cairo
Attendance: 50,000
Referee: Rajindraparsad Seechurn (Mauritius)

2–2 on aggregate. Al-Ahly won on the away goals rule.

== Top scorers ==
Rank	Player	Team	Goals
1	(Republic of the Congo) Kader Bidimbou	(Republic of the Congo) AC Léopards	6
1	(Ivory Coast) Koffi Foba	(Ivory Coast) ASEC Mimosas	6
1	(Zimbabwe) Kudakwashe Musharu	(Zimbabwe) How Mine	6
4	(Ivory Coast) Roger Assalé	(Ivory Coast) Séwé Sport	5
4	(Niger) Kamilou Daouda	(Cameroon) Coton Sport	5
4	(Seychelles) Jocelyn Fenosoa	(Seychelles) St Michel United	5
4	(Morocco) Ayoub Nanah	(Morocco) Difaâ El Jadidi	5
8	(Republic of the Congo) Césaire Gandzé	(Republic of the Congo) AC Léopards	4
8	(Senegal) Ladji Keita	(Angola) Petro de Luanda	4
8	(Mali) Ali Badra Sylla	(Mali) AS Real Bamako	4

== See also ==
- 2014 CAF Champions League
- 2015 CAF Super Cup
