= Saah Nyumah =

Liberian footballer

Personal information
- Date of birth: 2 June 1997 (age 29)
- Place of birth: Vonjama, Liberia
- Position: Midfielder

Team information
- Current team: LISCR

Senior career*
Years	Team	Apps	(Gls)
2013–2014	Red Lions		
2015	Wassaman United		
2016–	LISCR		

International career^{‡}
2016–	Liberia	3	(0)
- * Club domestic league appearances and goals as of 11:43, 19 September 2018 (UTC) ‡ National team caps and goals as of 11:43, 19 September 2018 (UTC)

Saah Nyumah (born 2 July 1997) is a Liberian footballer who plays for LISCR as a midfielder.

== Career ==
Born in Vonjama, Nyumah has played for Red Lions, Wassaman United and LISCR.

He made his international debut for Liberia in 2015.
