= 2009–10 Stade Malherbe Caen season =

Stade Malherbe Caen
2009–10 season
- Chairman: Jean-François Fortin
- Head coach: Franck Dumas
- Stadium: Stade Michel d'Ornano
- Ligue 2: 1st (promoted)
- Coupe de France: Round of 64
- Coupe de la Ligue: First round
- Top goalscorer: League: Youssef El-Arabi (11); All: Youssef El-Arabi (11)
Home colours	Away colours	Third colours

The 2009–10 season was the 96th season in the existence of Stade Malherbe Caen and the club's first season back in the second division of French football. In addition to the domestic league, Caen participated in this season's editions of the Coupe de France and Coupe de la Ligue.

== Pre-season and friendlies ==
Win Draw Loss

11 July 2009 Friendly	Meyrin (France)	1–5	(France) Caen	France
CEST (UTC+2)

14 July 2009 Friendly	Le Havre (France)	1–1 (7–8 p)	(France) Caen	France
CEST (UTC+2)

22 July 2009 Friendly	Rennes (France)	1–3	(France) Caen	France
19:00 CEST (UTC+2)

25 July 2009 Friendly	Caen (France)	2–0	(France) Tours	France
CEST (UTC+2)

== Competitions ==
=== Overall record ===
Competition	First match	Last match	Starting round	Final position	Record							
Competition	First match	Last match	Starting round	Final position	Pld	W	D	L	GF	GA	GD	Win %
Ligue 2	10 August 2009	14 May 2010	Matchday 1	Winners	38	18	15	5	52	30	+22	47.37
Coupe de France	21 November 2009	9 January 2010	Seventh round	Round of 64	3	2	0	1	2	2	+0	66.67
Coupe de la Ligue	1 August 2009		First round	First round	1	0	0	1	0	2	−2	0.00
Total					42	20	15	7	54	34	+20	47.62

Last updated: 14 May 2010
Source: Soccerway

=== Ligue 2 ===
==== League table ====
Pos	Team	Pld	W	D	L	GF	GA	GD	Pts	Promotion or Relegation
1	Caen (C, P)	38	18	15	5	52	30	+22	69	Promotion to Ligue 1
2	Brest (P)	38	20	7	11	53	34	+19	67	Promotion to Ligue 1
3	Arles-Avignon (P)	38	16	12	10	43	39	+4	60	Promotion to Ligue 1
4	Metz	38	14	14	10	43	39	+4	56	
5	Angers	38	15	10	13	46	43	+3	55	

Source: Ligue 2
Rules for classification: 1) points; 2) goal difference; 3) number of goals scored.
(C) Champions; (P) Promoted

==== Results summary ====
Overall								Home						Away					
Pld	W	D	L	GF	GA	GD	Pts	W	D	L	GF	GA	GD	W	D	L	GF	GA	GD
38	18	15	5	52	30	+22	69	12	6	1	24	10	+14	6	9	4	28	20	+8

Last updated: 14 May 2010.
Source: Ligue 2

==== Results by round ====
Round	1	2	3	4	5	6	7	8	9	10	11	12	13	14	15	16	17	18	19	20	21	22	23	24	25	26	27	28	29	30	31	32	33	34	35	36	37	38
Ground	H	A	H	A	H	A	H	A	H	A	H	H	A	H	A	H	A	H	A	H	A	H	A	H	A	H	A	H	A	A	H	A	H	A	H	A	H	A
Result	W	W	W	D	W	D	W	D	W	W	W	W	L	D	W	W	L	D	W	W	D	D	D	W	L	D	D	W	D	W	W	D	D	D	D	L	L	W
Position	6	3	2	3	1	1	1	1	1	1	1	1	1	1	1	1	1	1	1	1	1	1	1	1	1	1	1	1	1	1	1	1	1	1	1	1	1	1

Source: Ligue 2
A = Away; H = Home; W = Win; D = Draw; L = Loss

==== Matches ====
The league fixtures were announced on 5 June 2009.

10 August 2009 1	Caen	1–0	Nantes	Caen
17:00 CET (UTC+1)		Report		Stadium: Stade Michel d'Ornano

14 August 2009 2	Bastia	1–2	Caen	[[]]
17:00 CET (UTC+1)		Report		Stadium: [[]]

18 August 2009 3	Caen	1–0	Dijon	Caen
17:00 CET (UTC+1)		Report		Stadium: Stade Michel d'Ornano

21 August 2009 4	Châteauroux	1–1	Caen	[[]]
17:00 CET (UTC+1)		Report		Stadium: [[]]

28 August 2009 5	Caen	1–0	Arles-Avignon	Caen
17:00 CET (UTC+1)		Report		Stadium: Stade Michel d'Ornano

11 September 2009 6	Guingamp	0–0	Caen	[[]]
17:00 CET (UTC+1)		Report		Stadium: [[]]

21 September 2009 7	Caen	1–0	Ajaccio	Caen
17:00 CET (UTC+1)		Report		Stadium: Stade Michel d'Ornano

28 September 2009 8	Strasbourg	2–2	Caen	[[]]
17:00 CET (UTC+1)		Report		Stadium: [[]]

2 October 2009 9	Caen	3–1	Sedan	Caen
17:00 CET (UTC+1)		Report		Stadium: Stade Michel d'Ornano

16 October 2009 10	Clermont	1–3	Caen	[[]]
17:00 CET (UTC+1)		Report		Stadium: [[]]

23 October 2009 11	Caen	2–1	Angers	Caen
17:00 CET (UTC+1)		Report		Stadium: Stade Michel d'Ornano

27 October 2009 12	Caen	4–2	Vannes	Caen
17:00 CET (UTC+1)		Report		Stadium: Stade Michel d'Ornano

30 October 2009 13	Brest	2–0	Caen	[[]]
17:00 CET (UTC+1)		Report		Stadium: [[]]

6 November 2009 14	Caen	0–0	Tours	Caen
17:00 CET (UTC+1)		Report		Stadium: Stade Michel d'Ornano

27 November 2009 15	Nîmes	0–4	Caen	[[]]
17:00 CET (UTC+1)		Report		Stadium: [[]]

30 November 2009 16	Caen	2–0	Le Havre	Caen
17:00 CET (UTC+1)		Report		Stadium: Stade Michel d'Ornano

4 December 2009 17	Istres	2–1	Caen	[[]]
17:00 CET (UTC+1)		Report		Stadium: [[]]

18 December 2009 18	Caen	1–1	Laval	Caen
17:00 CET (UTC+1)		Report		Stadium: Stade Michel d'Ornano

15 January 2010 20	Caen	1–0	Bastia	Caen
17:00 CET (UTC+1)		Report		Stadium: Stade Michel d'Ornano

19 January 2010 21	Dijon	1–1	Caen	[[]]
17:00 CET (UTC+1)		Report		Stadium: [[]]

25 January 2010 19	Metz	1–3	Caen	[[]]
17:00 CET (UTC+1)		Report		Stadium: [[]]

29 January 2010 22	Caen	1–1	Châteauroux	Caen
17:00 CET (UTC+1)		Report		Stadium: Stade Michel d'Ornano

8 February 2010 23	Arles-Avignon	0–0	Caen	[[]]
17:00 CET (UTC+1)		Report		Stadium: [[]]

12 February 2010 24	Caen	2–0	Guingamp	Caen
17:00 CET (UTC+1)		Report		Stadium: Stade Michel d'Ornano

19 February 2010 25	Ajaccio	2–0	Caen	[[]]
17:00 CET (UTC+1)		Report		Stadium: [[]]

26 February 2010 26	Caen	0–0	Strasbourg	Caen
17:00 CET (UTC+1)		Report		Stadium: Stade Michel d'Ornano

5 March 2010 27	Sedan	0–0	Caen	[[]]
17:00 CET (UTC+1)		Report		Stadium: [[]]

12 March 2010 28	Caen	2–1	Clermont	Caen
17:00 CET (UTC+1)		Report		Stadium: Stade Michel d'Ornano

22 March 2010 29	Angers	2–2	Caen	[[]]
17:00 CET (UTC+1)		Report		Stadium: [[]]

26 March 2010 30	Vannes	0–3	Caen	[[]]
17:00 CET (UTC+1)		Report		Stadium: [[]]

2 April 2010 31	Caen	1–0	Brest	Caen
17:00 CET (UTC+1)		Report		Stadium: Stade Michel d'Ornano

9 April 2010 32	Tours	1–1	Caen	[[]]
17:00 CET (UTC+1)		Report		Stadium: [[]]

19 April 2010 33	Caen	0–0	Nîmes	Caen
17:00 CET (UTC+1)		Report		Stadium: Stade Michel d'Ornano

26 April 2010 34	Le Havre	1–1	Caen	[[]]
17:00 CET (UTC+1)		Report		Stadium: [[]]

30 April 2010 35	Caen	1–1	Istres	Caen
17:00 CET (UTC+1)		Report		Stadium: Stade Michel d'Ornano

4 May 2010 36	Laval	2–1	Caen	[[]]
17:00 CET (UTC+1)		Report		Stadium: [[]]

7 May 2010 37	Caen	0–2	Metz	Caen
17:00 CET (UTC+1)		Report		Stadium: Stade Michel d'Ornano

14 May 2010 38	Nantes	1–3	Caen	[[]]
17:00 CET (UTC+1)		Report		Stadium: [[]]

=== Coupe de France ===
21 November 2009 Seventh round	Caen	1–0	Dunkerque	Caen
CET (UTC+1)				Stadium: Stade Michel d'Ornano

12 December 2009 Eighth round	Les Lilas	0–1	Caen	Les Lilas
CET (UTC+1)				Stadium: Parc Municipal des Sports

9 January 2010 Round of 64	Rennes	2–0	Caen	Rennes
CET (UTC+1)				Stadium: [[]]

=== Coupe de la Ligue ===
1 August 2009 First round	Sedan	2–0 (a.e.t.)	Caen	Sedan
20:45 CEST (UTC+2)	Henaini 92'; Lasimant 106'			Stadium: Stade Louis Dugauguez; Attendance: 3,972; Referee: Saïd Ennjimi
