= Kudakwashe =

Kudakwashe is a Zimbabwean given or middle name that may refer to

- Kudakwashe Basopo (born 1990), Zimbabwean association football player
- Kudakwashe Mahachi (born 1993), Zimbabwean association football player
- Prince Kudakwashe Musarurwa (born 1988), Zimbabwean African jazz singer, songwriter and producer
- Kudakwashe Musharu (born 1987), Zimbabwean association football player
- David Kudakwashe Mnangagwa (born 1989), a Zimbabwean politician

Leeroy Kudakwashe Chitambira. Agronomist born 22 May 1989. Studied crop production and horticulture at Midlands State University, Zimbabwe.
