= Bernard Donovan =

Zimbabwean footballer (born 1995)

Personal information
- Date of birth: 12 July 1995 (age 31)
- Position: Goalkeeper

Team information
- Current team: How Mine

Senior career*
Years	Team	Apps	(Gls)
2013	Motor Action		
2014–	How Mine		

International career^{‡}
2014–	Zimbabwe	9	(0)
- * Club domestic league appearances and goals as of 12:55, 21 January 2017 (UTC) ‡ National team caps and goals as of 12:55, 21 January 2017 (UTC)

Bernard Donovan (born 12 July 1995) is a Zimbabwean international footballer who plays for How Mine as a goalkeeper.

== Career ==
Donovan has played for Motor Action and How Mine.

He made his international debut in 2014, and was named in the squad for the 2017 Africa Cup of Nations.
