= Al-Shamali AC =

Sudanese football club

- Full name: Al-Shamali Athletic Club
- Ground: Atbara Stadium, Atbara, River Nile State Sudan
- Capacity: 13,000
- League: Sudan Premier League
- 2009: last 12

Al-Shamali Athletic Club is a Sudanese football club based in Atbara. They played in the second division in Sudanese football, Sudan Premier League. Their home stadium is Atbara Stadium.The last time they played in the Sudan Premier League was in 2009
