= Union Douala =

Cameroonian association football club

Union de Douala
- Full name: Union Sportive de Douala
- Nickname: Kpa kum
- Founded: 1958; 68 years ago
- Ground: Stade de la Réunification; Douala, Cameroon
- Capacity: 39,000
- Chairman: Franck Happi
- Manager: Oumarou Sokba
- League: MTN Elite one
- 2023–24: 9th
Home colours	Away colours

Union Sportive de Douala is a Cameroonian professional football club based in Douala, that competes in the Elite One.

== History ==
It was founded in 1958 and played its home matches in the Stade de la Réunification.

== Achievements ==
=== National ===
- Cameroon Premiere Division: (5)
  - 1969, 1976, 1978, 1990, 2012
- Cameroon Cup: (7)

(Before independence)

1954 (as Jeunesse Bamiléké)

(After independence)

1961, 1969, 1980, 1985, 1997, 2006

=== Africa ===
- African Cup of Champions Clubs: (1)

1979

- African Cup Winners' Cup: (1)

1981

- African Super Cup: (finalist)

1982

== Performance in CAF competitions ==
As of 10 March 2014

Competition	Matches	W	D	L	GF	GA
African Cup of Champions Clubs / CAF Champions League	34	18	5	11	41	37
CAF Confederation Cup	18	8	3	7	27	25
CAF Cup Winners' Cup	18	10	2	6	38	19
Total	70	36	10	24	106	81

Season	Competition	Round	Country	Club	Home	Away	Aggregate
1970	African Cup of Champions Clubs	R1	(Niger)	Secteur 6	2–0	1–2	3–2
1970	African Cup of Champions Clubs	R2	(Togo)	Modèle Lomé	0–0	1–1	1–1
1977	African Cup of Champions Clubs	R1	(Republic of Upper Volta)	Silures	2–0	1–0	3–0
1977	African Cup of Champions Clubs	R2	(Togo)	Lomé I	1–1	1–1	2–2(p)
1979	African Cup of Champions Clubs	R2	(Algeria)	MP Alger	0–2	2–0	(p)2–2
1979	African Cup of Champions Clubs	QF	(Lesotho)	Matlama FC	3–1	2–0	5–1
1979	African Cup of Champions Clubs	SF	(Zaire)	CS Imana	2–1	1–0	3–1
1979	African Cup of Champions Clubs	Final	(Ghana)	Hearts of Oak	0–1	1–0	(p)1–1
1980	African Cup of Champions Clubs	R2	(Tanzania)	Simba	4–2	1–0	5–2
1980	African Cup of Champions Clubs	QF	(Senegal)	ASF Police	3–0	2–3	5–3
1980	African Cup of Champions Clubs	SF	(Zaire)	AS Bilima	1–0	1–5	2–5
1981	CAF Cup Winners' Cup	R1	(Angola)	Nacional Benguela	7–1	6–0	13–1
1981	CAF Cup Winners' Cup	R2	(Gabon)	FC 105 Libreville	3–1	1–0	4–1
1981	CAF Cup Winners' Cup	QF	(Algeria)	EP Sétif	5–0	1–1	6–1
1981	CAF Cup Winners' Cup	SF	(Ghana)	Sekondi Hasaacas	2–1	2–3	4–4
1981	CAF Cup Winners' Cup	Final	(Nigeria)	Stationery Stores	0–0	2–1	2–1
1982	CAF Cup Winners' Cup	R1	(Equatorial Guinea)	CD Elá Nguema	2–0	6–1	8–1
1982	CAF Cup Winners' Cup	R2	(Mali)	Djoliba AC	0–1	0–3	0–4
1986	CAF Cup Winners' Cup	R1	(Liberia)	Mighty Barrolle	0–0	1–2	1–2
1998	CAF Cup Winners' Cup	R1	Bye^{[1]}				
1998	CAF Cup Winners' Cup	R2	(Morocco)	Wydad Casablanca	1–0	0–4	1–4
1991	African Cup of Champions Clubs	R2	(Burundi)	Vital'O	2–0	0–0	2–0
1991	African Cup of Champions Clubs	QF	(Zambia)	Nkana Red Devils	2–1	0–1	2–2
2005	CAF Confederation Cup	R1	(Democratic Republic of the Congo)	SC Cilu	1–2	1–0	2–2
2005	CAF Confederation Cup	1R16	(Nigeria)	Enugu Rangers	1–3	1–0	2–3
2007	CAF Confederation Cup	R1	(Mozambique)	Têxtil do Punguè	3–0	3–0	6–0
2007	CAF Confederation Cup	1R16	(Nigeria)	Kwara United	1–1	2–3	3–4
2008	CAF Champions League	PR	(Togo)	ASKO Kara	0–1	1–3	1–4
2009	CAF Confederation Cup	R1	(Chad)	Tourbillon FC	2–1	3–2	5–3
2009	CAF Confederation Cup	1R16	(Angola)	Santos de Angola	1–1	0–4	1–5
2010	CAF Champions League	PR	(São Tomé and Príncipe)		w/o		
2010	CAF Champions League	R1	(Algeria)	ES Sétif	0–2	0–5	0–7
2012	CAF Confederation Cup	PR	(Sierra Leone)	FC Kallon	1–0	0–2	1–2
2013	CAF Champions League	PR	(Liberia)	LISCR	2–1	1–0	3–1
2013	CAF Champions League	R1	(Morocco)	FUS Rabat	1–0	0–3	1–3
2014	CAF Confederation Cup	PR	(Chad)	ASLAD de Moundou	3–0	1–2	4–2
2014	CAF Confederation Cup	R1	(Nigeria)	Warri Wolves	2–3	1–1	3–4

Notes:
^{^[1]} Union Douala were due to play the winner of the preliminary round tie between TP UCSA de Bangui and AS Vita Club, but following the disqualification of TP UCSA de Bangui due to their federation's debt with CAF and AS Vita Club's withdrawal, they received a bye into the second round.

== Crest ==
Former logo

Present logo

== Current squad ==
As of June 2019

Note: Flags indicate national team as defined under FIFA eligibility rules; some limited exceptions apply. Players may hold more than one non-FIFA nationality.

No.	Pos.	Nation	Player
1	GK	CAF	Prince-Junior Samolah
2	DF	CMR	Martin Patrick Loa
3	MF	CMR	Joseph Eock II
6	DF	CMR	Ngansop Mangaptche
7	MF	CMR	Alain Nandjou
8	FW	GHA	Zakari Awudu
9	FW	CMR	Mbianda Mbatkam Rodrique
10	FW	CMR	Jeannot Wang Bara
11	DF	CMR	Clévis Ashu Tambe
12	DF	CMR	Nankep Kouamedjo
15	DF	CMR	Aaron Mbimbe II
16	GK	CMR	Bleck Casimir Youmou

No.	Pos.	Nation	Player
18	MF	CMR	François Enoumba
19	FW	CMR	Didier Bassamagne
20	MF	CMR	Marvin Etongo
21	FW	TOG	Kabir Olufade
22	GK	CMR	Anye Fru
24	MF	CMR	Serge Alain Ané
25	MF	CMR	Christian Djumo Tchani
26	MF	CMR	Boris Atcham Emah
27	MF	CMR	Samuel Nkoua
28	FW	CMR	Jean Colbert Matike

== Staff ==
=== Management ===
Chairman

- Franck Happi

=== Sports ===
Head coach

- Oumarou Sokba

Assistant coach

Goalkeeper coach

=== Medical ===
Team doctor

- Dr. Nébil

Physio

- Dr. Armand Nebo

Masseur

- Dr. Ngamen Tondja

Physical therapist

- Épée Moume

== Former coaches ==
- (Cameroon) Maurice Mpondo (2007–09)
- (Cameroon) Jules Nyongha (2011)
- (Cameroon) Bonaventure Djonkep (2011–13)
- (Cameroon) Théophile Feunku (2013)
- (Cyprus) Vladan Tomić (2013–14)
- (France) Sébastien Roques (2014)
- (Cameroon) Joseph Diallo Siewé (2014–17)
- (Cameroon) Ernest Agbor (2017–18)
- (Cameroon) Daniel Walinjom (2018–19)
- (Cameroon) Richard Towa (2019–21)
- (Cameroon) Oumarou Sokba (2021–present)
