= Benatia =

Benatia is a surname. Notable people with the surname include:

- Abdelmadjid Benatia (born 1984), Algerian footballer
- Medhi Benatia (born 1987), French-born Moroccan footballer
