= Jules Nyongha =

Cameroonian footballer

Personal information
- Full name: Jules-Fredric Nyongha
- Date of birth: 3 October 1945 (age 81)
- Place of birth: Bafang, French Cameroon

Managerial career
- Years: Team
- 1992–1993: Cameroon
- 1994–1996: Cameroon
- 2007: Cameroon
- 2011: Union Douala
- 2013–2014: DAC
- 2017: Bamboutos FC
- 2019: Unisport FC de Bafang

Jules-Fredric Nyongha (born 3 October 1945) is a Cameroonian association football manager who most recently coached Unisport FC de Bafang.

== Career ==
Nyongha has had three spells in charge of the Cameroon national team, including at the 1996 Africa Cup of Nations.

Nyongha was appointed manager of Union Douala in May 2011. He left the club in September 2011.

In February 2013 he joined Douala Athletic Club.

In June 2017 he joined Bamboutos FC as manager. He was sacked in August 2017 due to poor results.

In 2019 he was brought in as manager to try to save Unisport FC de Bafang from relegation in the 2019 Elite One, but lost three of his four games in charge of the club resulting in the club getting relegated.
