= Estrela de Cantanhez FC =

- Full name: Estrela de Cantanhez Futebol Clube
- Ground: Estádio da Estrela; Cubucaré, Guinea-Bissau
- Capacity: 1,200
- Chairman: Helio Veira

Estrela de Cantanhez Futebol Clube is a football (soccer) club from Guinea-Bissau.

== Achievements ==
- Taça Nacional da Guiné Bissau: 1

2013.

== Performance in CAF competitions ==
- CAF Confederation Cup: 1 appearance

2014 –
