= Samy Houri =

French footballer (born 1985)

Personal information
- Date of birth: 9 August 1985 (age 41)
- Place of birth: Asnières-sur-Seine, France
- Height: 1.66 m (5 ft 5 in)
- Position: Midfielder

Team information
- Current team: Belfort

Youth career
- –2002: L'Entente SSG
- 2002–2005: AS Saint-Étienne

Senior career*
Years	Team	Apps	(Gls)
2005–2009	Saint-Étienne	9	(0)
2006–2007	→ Raon-l'Étape (loan)	32	(0)
2007–2008	→ Paris FC (loan)	29	(5)
2008–2009	→ Arles-Avignon (loan)	2	(0)
2009–2011	KV Oostende	38	(6)
2011–2013	FC Brussels	31	(15)
2013–2014	CS Constantine	8	(1)
2014–2015	Fréjus Saint-Raphaël	13	(4)
2015–2017	Limoges	39	(12)
2017–	Belfort	0	(0)
- * Club domestic league appearances and goals as of 12 July 2012

Samy Houri (born 9 August 1985 in Asnières-sur-Seine) is a French footballer.

== Career ==
- -1999 : Entente Sannois Saint-Gratien
- 2001–2002 : AS Saint-Étienne (L2)
- 2002–2003 : AS Saint-Étienne (CFA)
- 2003–2004 : AS Saint-Étienne (L2)
- 2004–2005 : AS Saint-Étienne (L1)
- 2005–2006 : AS Saint-Étienne (L1)
- 2006–2007 : AS Saint-Étienne (Championnat National) (loan)
- 2007–2008 : Paris FC (Championnat National) (loan)
- 2008–2009 : AS Saint-Étienne (L1)

== Titles ==
- Champion in Ligue 2 in 2004 AS Saint-Étienne
- Premier match in Ligue 1 : 11 January 2006, FC Metz – AS Saint-Étienne (0–1)
- June 2001 : 3^{e} du Tournoi de Salerne
- February 2002 : 2^{e} du Tournoi de l'Atlantique
- May 2002 : Vice-Champion d'Europe des Months de 17 ans

== Statistics ==
- 3 matches in L1
- 6 matches in L2
- 65 matches (12 buts) in National
- 79 matches (10 buts) in CFA
