= Al Ahli Club (Atbara) =

Sudanese football club

Al Ahli Atbara الأهلي عطبرة
- Full name: Al Ahli Club of Atbara النادي الأهلي عطبرة
- Founded: 1951; 74 years ago
- Ground: Atbara Stadium; Atbara, River Nile State, Sudan
- Capacity: 13,000
- League: Sudan Premier League

Al Ahli Club of Atbara (Arabic: النادي الأهلي عطبرة) is a Sudanese football club from Atbara, Sudan.

== Performance in CAF competitions ==
- CAF Confederation Cup: 1 appearance

2014 – Preliminary Round
