= Chuoni F.C. =

Chuoni FC
- Full name: Chuoni Football Club
- Founded: 1984
- Ground: Kianga Mento Ground
- Capacity: 1,000
- Chairman: Makame Hussein Mussa
- Manager: Bakar Hussein Mussa
- League: Zanzibar Premier League

Chuoni Football Club abbreviated as Chuoni FC is a Premier League football club in Zanzibar based in Unguja Island.

== History ==
The club was founded on 10 October 1984 by Maalim Hamad Bakar who was head of the Madrasat Qadiriya together with Students. The club initially was dominated by Madras Qadiriya students but subsequently expanded to cover all over Nyerere & Magogoni and Zanzibar at all.

In 1984 joined the Central Youth League in West District and in 1998 promoted to Zanzibar premier League under the guidance of Maalim Diwani (Head Coach) and Maalim Juma Hamad (President) and Ali Shaibu (Manager) the club soon progressed.2004 After finishing in second place in Zanzibar Premier League under guidance of Ali BAkar Ali "Mngazija" (Head Coach).

== Performance in CAF competitions ==
- CAF Confederation Cup: 1 appearance

2014
