= Sapele Stadium =

Multi-use stadium in Sapele, Nigeria

Coordinates: 5°53′58″N 5°40′59.7″E

Sapele Township Stadium is a multi-use stadium in Sapele, Nigeria. It is used mostly for football matches and athletics. It is the temporary home stadium of Bayelsa United F.C. The stadium has a capacity of 10,000 people. It was finally finished in 2013 after years of delays.

== Location ==
Sapele Stadium is located at Market Road, Sapele
