= Kudakwashe Musharu =

Zimbabwean footballer (born 1987)

Personal information
- Full name: Kudakwashe Musharu
- Date of birth: 8 January 1987 (age 39)
- Place of birth: Gweru, Zimbabwe
- Position: Forward

Team information
- Current team: Harare City

Senior career*
Years	Team	Apps	(Gls)
2004–2006	Zim Cast		
2007	Zim-Alloys		
2008–2009	Underhill		
2010	Monomotapa United		
2011	Motor Action		
2012	Monomotapa United		
2013	Motor Action		
2014–2017	How Mine		
2018–	Harare City		

International career^{‡}
2013–2014	Zimbabwe	3	(1)
- * Club domestic league appearances and goals as of 14 November 2020 ‡ National team caps and goals as of 14 November 2020

Kudakwashe Musharu (born 8 January 1987) is a Zimbabwean professional footballer who plays as a forward for Zimbabwe Premier Soccer League club Harare City and the Zimbabwe national team.

== Club career ==
Musharu began his senior career with Underhill before transferring to Monomotapa United in 2010. After just one season, he joined Motor Action, where he played from 2011 to 2014.

In April 2014, Musharu underwent a trial with South African club AmaZulu, but did not secure a contract. A year later, in January 2015, he had another unsuccessful trial with Mpumalanga Black Aces.

Later in 2014, Musharu signed with How Mine, where he remained until the club withdrew from the Premier Soccer League at the end of 2017.

In March 2018, he joined Harare City ahead of the new season.

== International career ==
Musharu has made three appearances for the Zimbabwe national team. He scored his only international goal in a 2013 friendly match against Malawi.

In 2014, he featured in both legs of Zimbabwe's 2015 Africa Cup of Nations qualifiers against Tanzania.

== Career statistics ==
=== International ===
As of 15 May 2018.

National team	Year	Apps	Goals
Zimbabwe	2013	1	1
Zimbabwe	2014	2	0
Total		3	1

=== International goals ===
As of 15 May 2018. Scores and results list Zimbabwe's goal tally first.

Goal	Date	Venue	Opponent	Score	Result	Competition
1	25 May 2013	Kamuzu Stadium, Blantyre, Malawi	Malawi	1–1	1–1	Friendly
