= ASLAD de Moundou =

Chadian football club

ASLAD
- Full name: Association Sportive du Lycée Adoum Dallah
- League: Chad Premier League

Association Sportive du Lycée Adoum Dallah or simply AS Lycée Adoum Dallah, known also as ASLAD for a short is a football (soccer) club from Chad based in Moundou.

== Achievements ==
- Chad Cup: 1

2013.

== Performance in CAF competitions ==
- CAF Confederation Cup: 1 appearance

2014 –

- CAF Cup: 1 appearance

2000 – withdrew in First Round
