= Hamza Boulemdaïs =

Algerian footballer (born 1982)

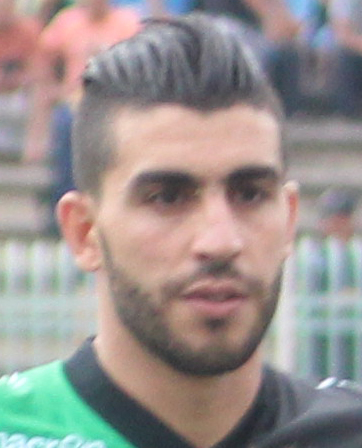

Personal information
- Full name: Hamza Boulemdaïs
- Date of birth: 22 November 1982 (age 43)
- Place of birth: Constantine, Algeria
- Position: Forward

Team information
- Current team: CS Constantine

Youth career
- 1999–2002: MO Constantine

Senior career*
Years	Team	Apps	(Gls)
2002–2007	MO Constantine	-	(-)
2007–2008	MSP Batna	28	(10)
2008–2010	JSM Béjaïa	55	(14)
2010–2011	MC El Eulma	29	(11)
2011–2012	JS Kabylie	25	(6)
2012–	CS Constantine	85	(36)

International career^{‡}
2012–2017	Algeria	1	(0)
- * Club domestic league appearances and goals as of 21:00, 16 August 2014 (EST) ‡ National team caps and goals as of 00:00, 3 December 2012 (UTC)

Hamza Boulemdaïs (born 22 November 1982) is an Algerian football player who is currently playing for CS Constantine in the Algerian Ligue Professionnelle 1.

== Club career ==
On 6 July 2011 Boulemdaïs announced that he would be joining JS Kabylie at the end of the season.
