= Republic of Sierra Leone Armed Forces F.C. =

RSLAF FC
- Full name: Republic of Sierra Leone Armed Forces FC
- Ground: Wusum Sports Stadium; Makeni, Sierra Leone
- Capacity: 2,000
- Chairman: Col. Alhassan Sulayman Conteh
- Manager: Sgt. Ibrahim Momodu Bangura
- League: Sierra Leone National Premier League
- 2013: 2nd place

Republic of Sierra Leone Armed Forces FC or simply RSLAF FC is a Sierra Leonean professional football club based in Makeni. They play in the Sierra Leone National Premier League, the top football league in Sierra Leone.

== Honours ==
- Sierra Leone National Premier League

Runners-up (1 time): 2013

== Stadium ==
Republic of Sierra Leone Armed Forces FC play their home games at the 2000 capacity Wusum Sports Stadium.
