= Atbara Stadium =

Multi-purpose stadium in Atbara, Sudan

Coordinates: 17.68865°N 33.97422°E

Atbara Stadium (Arabic: ستاد عطبرة) is a Sudanese multi-purpose stadium in Atbara, River Nile State. It is currently used primarily for football matches and is the home stadium of Alamal SC Atbara. The stadium has a capacity of 13,000 people.
