= Eyemen Henaini =

French footballer (born 1984)

Personal information
- Full name: Eyemen Samir Henaini
- Date of birth: 4 May 1984 (age 42)
- Place of birth: Saint-Raphaël, France
- Height: 1.86 m (6 ft 1 in)
- Position: Forward

Team information
- Current team: Cannet Rocheville

Youth career
- Fréjus

Senior career*
Years	Team	Apps	(Gls)
2002–2006	ES Frejus	53	(12)
2006–2011	Sedan	40	(4)
2007–2008	→ Paris FC (loan)	24	(3)
2008–2009	→ Arles (loan)	37	(21)
2010–2011	→ Fréjus (loan)	37	(11)
2011–2013	Fréjus	88	(26)
2013–2014	CS Constantine	9	(2)
2014–2015	Colmar	12	(1)
2015	Colmar B	3	(2)
2015–2016	Amiens	30	(1)
2016–2017	Toulon	11	(0)
2017–	Cannet Rocheville	2	(0)
- * Club domestic league appearances and goals as of 08:50, 28 October 2016 (UTC)

Eyemen Samir Henaini (born 4 May 1984) is a French footballer who plays for Cannet Rocheville.

== Personal ==
Henaini was born in Saint-Raphaël in the south of France. His family is originally from the city of Chlef in Algeria. He holds both French and Algerian nationalities.

== Club career ==
On 24 January 2007 he made his Sedan Ligue 1 debut against Sochaux

On 6 July 2010 Henaini was loaned out to Championnat National side ES Frejus for the 2010–2011 season.

On 15 July 2011 Henaini joined Dubai Club in the UAE Pro-League.
