= How Mine F.C. =

Football club in Zimbabwe

How Mine FC
- Full name: How Mine Football Club
- Nickname: Chikurupati
- Dissolved: 2018
- Ground: Luveve and White City Stadium, Bulawayo; Zimbabwe
- Capacity: 20,000
- Chairman: Paul MacAndrews
- Manager: Kelvin Kaindu
- League: Zimbabwe Premier Soccer League
- 2015: 11th
Home colours	Away colours

How Mine Football Club was a football club based in Bulawayo, Zimbabwe. The club played in the Zimbabwe Premier Soccer League before surrendering their license before the 2018 season. The team was sponsored by the How gold mine.

How Mine appeared in the 2017 Chibuku Cup final, losing 3–1 to Harare City.

== Stadium ==
The team played in the 20,000-seat Luveve and White City Stadium in Bulawayo, Zimbabwe.

== League participations ==
- Zimbabwe Premier Soccer League: 2013–2017
- Zimbabwean Second Division: ?–2013

== Sponsors ==
- How Mine holdings

League sponsor

- Delta Beverages
- matches viewable on Supersport
