= Red Lions FC (Liberia) =

Liberian football club

- Full name: Red Lions Football Club
- Founded: 2004
- Ground: Nancy B. Doe Stadium; Kakata, Liberia
- Capacity: 8.000
- Chairman: Ansu Dulleh
- League: Liberian Premier League
- 2013–14: 11th (Relegated)

Red Lions Football Club, formerly Fatu Football Club until 2013, is a football club based in Paynesville, Monrovia Liberia. The team was established in August, 2004 in the City of Paynesville as a Fourth Division team. The team spent two seasons in the Fourth and Third Division before entering the Second Division. The team finished as runner up in the second division and entered the First Division in 2008–09 football season.

Fatu FC were acquired by Ghana's Red Lions FC on November 5, 2013.

== Achievements ==
- Liberian Premier League: 0
- Liberian Cup: 0

Runner-up: 2012–13

- Liberian Super Cup: 0
