= Judson =

Judson may refer to:

== Places ==
=== Canada ===
- Judson, Alberta
- Mount Judson, Vancouver Island, British Columbia

=== United States ===
- Judson, Indiana, Howard County
- Judson, Parke County, Indiana
- North Judson, Indiana, Starke County
- Judson, Minnesota, an unincorporated community
- Judson Township, Blue Earth County, Minnesota
- Judson, North Carolina (disambiguation), multiple locations
- Judson, South Carolina, Greenville County
- Judson, Texas, Gregg County
- Judson, West Virginia, Summers County

== People ==
- Judson (name), a list of people with the surname or given name
- Judson (footballer, born 1992), Brazilian-Equatoguinean footballer Judson Augusto do Bonfim Santos
- Judson (footballer, born 1993), Brazilian footballer Judson Silva Tavares

== Education ==
- Judson College (disambiguation), multiple schools
- Judson High School, a public secondary school in Converse, Texas
- Judson Independent School District, San Antonio, Texas
- Judson School, former boarding school in Paradise Valley, Arizona
- Judson University, Christian college in Elgin, Illinois; named after Adoniram Judson

== Other uses ==
- Judson Dance Theater, a group of postmodern dancers who performed at the church in New York City
- Judson Health Center, New York City
- Judson Memorial Church, New York City
- Judson Studios, Los Angeles
- Judson Technologies, a company manufacturing infrared detectors
- 17844 Judson, an asteroid
- The Judson, a building Illinois
- Judson-Rives Building, also known as The Judson, a building in Los Angeles, California
