= São Tomé and Príncipe national football team results =

National football team results

This page details the match results and statistics of the São Tomé and Príncipe national football team.

== Key ==
Key to matches

- Att.=Match attendance
- (H)=Home ground
- (A)=Away ground
- (N)=Neutral ground

Key to record by opponent

- Pld=Games played
- W=Games won
- D=Games drawn
- L=Games lost
- GF=Goals for
- GA=Goals against

== Results ==
São Tomé and Príncipe's score is shown first in each case.

No.	Date	Venue	Opponents	Score	Competition	São Tomé and Príncipe scorers	Att.	Ref.
1	2 May 1976	(A)	Gabon	1–6	Friendly	Minho	—	
2	2 July 1976	Libreville (N)	Congo	0–11	1976 Central African Games		—	
3	4 July 1976	Libreville (N)	Central African Republic	1–2	1976 Central African Games	Unknown	—	
4	6 July 1976	Libreville (N)	Chad	0–5	1976 Central African Games		—	
5	June 1977	(H)	Rwanda	1–0	Friendly	Unknown	—	
6	June 1977	(H)	Rwanda	0–0	Friendly		—	
7	10 July 1978	(H)	Angola	3–3	Friendly	Unknown	—	
8	12 July 1979	(H)	Angola	1–2	Friendly	Unknown	—	
9	1 June 1981	(A)	Equatorial Guinea	1–1	Friendly	Unknown	—	
10	30 June 1985	Estádio da Várzea, Praia (N)	Angola	2–3	Torneio dos Cinco	Unknown	—	
11	5 April 1987	(A)	Angola	0–4	Friendly		—	
12	11 July 1987	(H)	Guinea-Bissau	0–1	Torneio dos Cinco		—	
13	2 August 1998	Stade Omar Bongo, Libreville (H)	Togo	0–4	2000 African Cup of Nations qualification		3,000	
14	18 August 1998	Stade Municipal, Lomé (A)	Togo	0–2	2000 African Cup of Nations qualification		4,000	
15	10 November 1999	Stade Omar Bongo, Libreville (N)	Chad	0–5	UNIFAC Cup		—	
16	11 November 1999	Stade Omar Bongo, Libreville (N)	Gabon	0–1	UNIFAC Cup		—	
17	12 November 1999	Stade Omar Bongo, Libreville (N)	Congo	0–1	UNIFAC Cup		—	
18	13 November 1999	Stade Omar Bongo, Libreville (N)	Central African Republic	0–3	UNIFAC Cup		—	
19	14 November 1999	Stade Omar Bongo, Libreville (N)	Equatorial Guinea	2–0	UNIFAC Cup	Aguiar, Jordao	—	
20	8 April 2000	Estádio Nacional 12 de Julho, São Tomé (H)	Sierra Leone	2–0	2002 FIFA World Cup qualification	Ramos, Pontes	6,500	
21	22 April 2000	National Stadium, Freetown (A)	Sierra Leone	0–4	2002 FIFA World Cup qualification		65,000	
22	1 July 2000	Estádio Nacional 12 de Julho, São Tomé (H)	Gabon	1–1	2002 African Cup of Nations qualification	Tonga	—	
23	15 July 2000	Stade Omar Bongo, Libreville (A)	Gabon	1–4	2002 African Cup of Nations qualification	Ramos	15,000	
24	11 October 2003	Estádio Nacional 12 de Julho, São Tomé (H)	Libya	0–1	2006 FIFA World Cup qualification		4,000	
25	12 November 2003	Estadio La Libertad, Bata (A)	Equatorial Guinea	1–3	Friendly	Unknown	—	
26	16 November 2003	28 March Stadium, Benghazi (A)	Libya	0–8	2006 FIFA World Cup qualification		20,000	
	18 October 2006	Chungshan Soccer Stadium, Taipei (A)	Chinese Taipei	2–2	Friendly	Baia, Ceita	—	
27	11 November 2011	Estádio Nacional 12 de Julho, São Tomé (H)	Congo	0–5	2014 FIFA World Cup qualification		3,000	
28	15 November 2011	Stade Municipal, Pointe-Noire (A)	Congo	1–1	2014 FIFA World Cup qualification	Gando	12,000	
29	15 January 2012	Estádio Nacional 12 de Julho, São Tomé (H)	Lesotho	1–0	2013 Africa Cup of Nations qualification	Jair	—	
30	22 January 2012	Setsoto Stadium, Maseru (A)	Lesotho	0–0	2013 Africa Cup of Nations qualification		—	
31	29 February 2012	Estádio Nacional 12 de Julho, São Tomé (H)	Sierra Leone	2–1	2013 Africa Cup of Nations qualification	Jair, Lasset	—	
32	16 June 2012	National Stadium, Freetown (A)	Sierra Leone	2–4	2013 Africa Cup of Nations qualification	Jair, Zé	—	
33	17 May 2014	Estádio Nacional 12 de Julho, São Tomé (H)	Benin	0–2	2015 Africa Cup of Nations qualification		—	
34	1 June 2014	Stade Charles de Gaulle, Porto-Novo (A)	Benin	0–2	2015 Africa Cup of Nations qualification		—	
35	13 June 2015	Estádio Nacional de Cabo Verde, Praia (A)	Cape Verde	1–7	2017 Africa Cup of Nations qualification	Leal	—	
36	5 September 2015	Estádio Nacional 12 de Julho, São Tomé (H)	Morocco	0–3	2017 Africa Cup of Nations qualification		—	
37	8 October 2015	Estádio Nacional 12 de Julho, São Tomé (H)	Ethiopia	1–0	2018 FIFA World Cup qualification	Leal	4,550	
38	11 October 2015	Addis Ababa Stadium, Addis Ababa (A)	Ethiopia	0–3	2018 FIFA World Cup qualification		23,840	
39	23 March 2016	Estádio Nacional 12 de Julho, São Tomé (H)	Libya	2–1	2017 Africa Cup of Nations qualification	El Trbi (o.g.), Leal	—	
40	28 March 2016	Petro Sport Stadium, Cairo (A)	Libya	0–4	2017 Africa Cup of Nations qualification		—	
41	4 June 2016	Estádio Nacional 12 de Julho, São Tomé (H)	Cape Verde	1–2	2017 Africa Cup of Nations qualification	Faduley	—	
42	4 September 2016	Prince Moulay Abdellah Stadium, Rabat (A)	Morocco	0–2	2017 Africa Cup of Nations qualification		—	
43	22 March 2017	Estádio Nacional 12 de Julho, São Tomé (H)	Madagascar	0–1	2019 Africa Cup of Nations qualification		—	
44	26 March 2017	Mahamasina Municipal Stadium, Antananarivo (A)	Madagascar	2–3	2019 Africa Cup of Nations qualification	Harramiz, Zé	—	
45	24 March 2018	Mandela National Stadium, Kampala (A)	Uganda	1–3	Friendly	Zé	—	
46	4 September 2019	Estádio Nacional 12 de Julho, São Tomé (H)	Guinea-Bissau	0–1	2022 FIFA World Cup qualification		4,000	
47	10 September 2019	Estádio 24 de Setembro, Bissau (A)	Guinea-Bissau	1–2	2022 FIFA World Cup qualification	Iniesta	14,500	
48	9 October 2019	Anjalay Stadium, Belle Vue Harel (A)	Mauritius	3–1	2021 Africa Cup of Nations qualification	Leal (2), Silva	—	
49	13 October 2019	Estádio Nacional 12 de Julho, São Tomé (H)	Mauritius	2–1	2021 Africa Cup of Nations qualification	Barbeiro, Leal	—	
50	13 November 2019	Al-Hilal Stadium, Omdurman (A)	Sudan	0–4	2021 Africa Cup of Nations qualification		—	
51	18 November 2019	Estádio Nacional 12 de Julho, São Tomé (H)	Ghana	0–1	2021 Africa Cup of Nations qualification		—	
52	13 November 2020	Soccer City, Johannesburg (A)	South Africa	0–2	2021 Africa Cup of Nations qualification		—	
53	16 November 2020	Nelson Mandela Bay Stadium, Port Elizabeth (H)	South Africa	2–4	2021 Africa Cup of Nations qualification	Joazhifel, Harramiz	—	
54	24 March 2021	Estádio Nacional 12 de Julho, São Tomé (H)	Sudan	0–2	2021 Africa Cup of Nations qualification		—	
55	28 March 2021	Accra Sports Stadium, Accra (A)	Ghana	1–3	2021 Africa Cup of Nations qualification	Iniesta	—	
56	24 March 2022	Complexe Sportif de Côte d'Or, Saint Pierre (H)	Mauritius	1–0	2023 Africa Cup of Nations qualification	Leal	—	
57	27 March 2022	Complexe Sportif de Côte d'Or, Saint Pierre (A)	Mauritius	3–3	2023 Africa Cup of Nations qualification	Cardoso (2), Leal	—	
58	9 June 2022	Adrar Stadium, Agadir (A)	Guinea-Bissau	1–5	2023 Africa Cup of Nations qualification	Viegas	—	
59	13 June 2022	Adrar Stadium, Agadir (H)	Nigeria	0–10	2023 Africa Cup of Nations qualification		—	
60	22 March 2023	Adrar Stadium, Agadir (A)	Sierra Leone	2–2	2023 Africa Cup of Nations qualification	Leal (2)	—	
61	26 March 2023	Adrar Stadium, Agadir (H)	Sierra Leone	0–2	2023 Africa Cup of Nations qualification		—	
62	14 June 2023	Estádio 24 de Setembro, Bissau (H)	Guinea-Bissau	0–1	2023 Africa Cup of Nations qualification		—	
63	10 September 2023	Godswill Akpabio International Stadium, Uyo (A)	Nigeria	0–6	2023 Africa Cup of Nations qualification		—	
64	17 November 2023	Hammadi Agrebi Stadium, Radès (A)	Tunisia	0–4	2026 FIFA World Cup qualification		10,000	
65	21 November 2023	Adrar Stadium, Agadir (H)	Namibia	0–2	2026 FIFA World Cup qualification		—	
66	22 March 2024	Berkane Municipal Stadium, Berkane (H)	South Sudan	1–1	2025 Africa Cup of Nations qualification	Leal	—	
67	26 March 2024	Berkane Municipal Stadium, Berkane (A)	South Sudan	0–0	2025 Africa Cup of Nations qualification		—	
68	6 June 2024	Bingu National Stadium, Lilongwe (A)	Malawi	1–3	2026 FIFA World Cup qualification	Silva	14,000	
69	9 June 2024	Honor Stadium, Oujda (H)	Liberia	0–1	2026 FIFA World Cup qualification		13,025	
70	21 March 2025	Estadio de Malabo, Malabo (A)	Equatorial Guinea	0–2	2026 FIFA World Cup qualification		—	
71	24 March 2025	Samuel Kanyon Doe Sports Complex, Paynesville (A)	Liberia	1–2	2026 FIFA World Cup qualification	Dola	—	
72	4 September 2025	Honor Stadium, Oujda (H)	Equatorial Guinea	2–3	2026 FIFA World Cup qualification	Afonso (2)	—	
73	9 September 2025	Obed Itani Chilume Stadium, Francistown (A)	Namibia	0–3	2026 FIFA World Cup qualification		—	
74	10 October 2025	Hammadi Agrebi Stadium, Radès (H)	Tunisia	0–6	2026 FIFA World Cup qualification		—	
75	13 October 2025	Sousse Olympic Stadium, Sousse (H)	Malawi	1–0	2026 FIFA World Cup qualification	Afonso	—	
76	27 March 2026	Ben M'Hamed El Abdi Stadium, El Jadida (N)	Ethiopia	0–3	2027 AFCON qualification		—	
77	31 March 2026	Dire Dawa Stadium, Dire Dawa (A)	Ethiopia	0–1	2027 AFCON qualification		—	
78	23 September 2026	Europa Point Stadium, Europa Point (A)	Gibraltar	0–0	Friendly		—	

Notes

1. A: São Tomé and Príncipe played their home match in qualifying for the 2000 African Cup of Nations in Libreville, Gabon.
2. B: Due to security concerns, Libya played their home matches in qualifying for the 2017 Africa Cup of Nations in Cairo, Egypt and Radés, Tunisia.
3. C: Due to the COVID-19 pandemic in Africa, São Tomé and Príncipe played their home match against South Africa in qualifying for the 2021 Africa Cup of Nations in Port Elizabeth, South Africa.
4. D: São Tomé and Príncipe played their home matches in qualifying for the 2023 Africa Cup of Nations in Saint Pierre, Mauritius; Agadir, Morocco and Bissau, Guinea-Bissau.
5. E: Guinea-Bissau played their home match against São Tomé and Príncipe in qualifying for the 2023 Africa Cup of Nations in Agadir, Morocco.
6. F: Sierra Leone played their home match against São Tomé and Príncipe in qualifying for the 2023 Africa Cup of Nations in Agadir, Morocco.
7. G: São Tomé and Príncipe played their home match against Namibia in qualifying for the 2026 FIFA World Cup in Agadir, Morocco.

== Record by opponent ==
Team	Pld	W	D	L	GF	GA	GD	WPCT
Angola	4	0	1	3	6	12	−6	0.00
Benin	2	0	0	2	0	4	−4	0.00
Cape Verde	2	0	0	2	2	9	−7	0.00
Central African Republic	2	0	0	2	1	5	−4	0.00
Chad	2	0	0	2	0	10	−10	0.00
Congo	4	0	1	3	1	18	−17	0.00
Equatorial Guinea	5	1	1	3	6	9	−3	20.00
Ethiopia	4	1	0	3	1	7	−6	25.00
Gabon	4	0	1	3	3	12	−9	0.00
Ghana	2	0	0	2	1	4	−3	0.00
Gibraltar	1	0	1	0	0	0	0	0.00
Guinea-Bissau	5	0	0	5	2	10	−8	0.00
Lesotho	2	1	1	0	1	0	+1	50.00
Liberia	2	0	0	2	1	3	−2	0.00
Libya	4	1	0	3	2	14	−12	25.00
Madagascar	2	0	0	2	2	4	−2	0.00
Malawi	2	1	0	1	2	3	−1	50.00
Mauritius	4	3	1	0	9	5	+4	75.00
Morocco	2	0	0	2	0	5	−5	0.00
Namibia	1	0	0	1	0	2	−2	0.00
Nigeria	2	0	0	2	0	16	−16	0.00
Rwanda	2	1	1	0	1	0	+1	50.00
Sierra Leone	6	2	1	3	7	12	−5	33.33
South Africa	2	0	0	2	2	6	−4	0.00
South Sudan	2	0	2	0	1	1	0	0.00
Sudan	2	0	0	2	0	6	−6	0.00
Togo	2	0	0	2	0	6	−6	0.00
Tunisia	2	0	0	2	0	10	−10	0.00
Uganda	1	0	0	1	1	3	−2	0.00
Total	77	11	11	55	52	196	−144	14.29

Source: Results
