= Abana =

Abana or ABANA may refer to:

== Places ==
- Abana District, Kastamonu Province, Turkey
- Abana, Kastamonu, a town and district seat
- Barada River, a river near Damascus identified as Abana in the Bible

== People ==
- Hisseine Abana (born 1983), Chadian footballer
- Steve Abana (born 1969), Solomon Islands politician

== Other uses ==
- Abana (barque), a ship wrecked at Blackpool in 1894
- Abana (leafhopper), a genus of sharpshooter (insect)
- Artist-Blacksmith's Association of North America, a trade association
- Abana (film), a 1958 Indian Sindhi-language film
