= 2013 Africa Cup of Nations qualification =

Football matches

The 2013 Africa Cup of Nations qualification was the qualification process for the 2013 Africa Cup of Nations, the 29th edition of the Africa Cup of Nations tournament. South Africa automatically qualified as the host country.

== Qualified nations ==
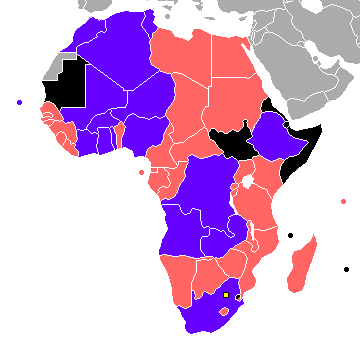
Qualified Failed to qualify Did not enter Not part of CAF

Country	Qualified by winning against	Qualification date	Previous appearances in tournament^{†}
South Africa	Hosts	28 September 2011	7 (**1996**, 1998, 2000, 2002, 2004, 2006, 2008)
Ghana	Malawi	13 October 2012	18 (**1963**, **1965**, 1968, 1970, **1978**, 1980, **1982**, 1984, 1992, 1994, 1996, 1998, 2000, 2002, 2006, 2008, 2010, 2012)
Mali	Botswana	13 October 2012	7 (1972, 1994, 2002, 2004, 2008, 2010, 2012)
Zambia	Uganda	13 October 2012	15 (1974, 1978, 1982, 1986, 1990, 1992, 1994, 1996, 1998, 2000, 2002, 2006, 2008, 2010, **2012**)
Nigeria	Liberia	13 October 2012	16 (1963, 1976, 1978, **1980**, 1982, 1984, 1988, 1990, 1992, **1994**, 2000, 2002, 2004, 2006, 2008, 2010)
Tunisia	Sierra Leone	13 October 2012	15 (1962, 1963, 1965, 1978, 1982, 1994, 1996, 1998, 2000, 2002, **2004**, 2006, 2008, 2010, 2012)
Ivory Coast	Senegal	13 October 2012	19 (1965, 1968, 1970, 1974, 1980, 1984, 1986, 1988, 1990, **1992**, 1994, 1996, 1998, 2000, 2002, 2006, 2008, 2010, 2012)
Morocco	Mozambique	13 October 2012	14 (1972, **1976**, 1978, 1980, 1986, 1988, 1992, 1998, 2000, 2002, 2004, 2006, 2008, 2012)
Ethiopia	Sudan	14 October 2012	9 (1957, 1959, **1962**, 1963, 1965, 1968, 1970, 1976, 1982)
Cape Verde	Cameroon	14 October 2012	0 (debut)
Angola	Zimbabwe	14 October 2012	6 (1996, 1998, 2006, 2008, 2010, 2012)
Niger	Guinea	14 October 2012	1 (2012)
Togo	Gabon	14 October 2012	6 (1972, 1984, 1998, 2000, 2002, 2006)
DR Congo	Equatorial Guinea	14 October 2012	15 (1965, **1968**, 1970, 1972, **1974**, 1976, 1988, 1992, 1994, 1996, 1998, 2000, 2002, 2004, 2006)
Burkina Faso	Central African Rep.	14 October 2012	8 (1978, 1996, 1998, 2000, 2002, 2004, 2010, 2012)
Algeria	Libya	14 October 2012	14 (1968, 1980, 1982, 1984, 1986, 1988, **1990**, 1992, 1996, 1998, 2000, 2002, 2004, 2010)

^{†} Bold indicates champion for that year
^{†} Italic indicates host

== Format ==
A total of 47 countries entered the competition, including South Africa, which automatically qualified.

The remaining 46 teams competed in the qualifiers. In each of the three rounds, teams were drawn into two-legged home-and-away knock-out ties. Aggregate goals were used to determine the winner. If the sides were level on aggregate after the second leg, the away goals rule was applied, and if still level, the tie proceeded directly to a penalty shootout instead of any extra time being played.

- Preliminary round: The lowest-ranked four teams started from the preliminary round.
- First round: The two winners of the preliminary round joined the other 26 teams which did not qualify for the 2012 Africa Cup of Nations.
- Second round: The 14 winners of the first round joined the 16 teams which qualified for the 2012 Africa Cup of Nations.

The 15 winners of the second round qualified for the finals.

The draw for the preliminary round and the first round was made on 28 October 2011 in Malabo, Equatorial Guinea. The draw for the second round was made on 5 July 2012 in Johannesburg, South Africa, after the first round was completed.

Below is the list of entrants:

Bye to second round (2012 ACN qualifiers)	Bye to first round (2012 ACN non-qualifiers except lowest-ranked teams)		Competing in preliminary round (lowest-ranked teams)
Angola; Botswana; Burkina Faso; Ivory Coast; Equatorial Guinea; Gabon; Ghana; Guinea; Libya; Mali; Morocco; Niger; Senegal; Sudan; Tunisia; Zambia	Algeria; Benin; Burundi; Cameroon; Cape Verde; Central African Republic; Chad; Congo; DR Congo; Egypt; Ethiopia; Gambia; Guinea-Bissau	Kenya; Liberia; Madagascar; Malawi; Mozambique; Namibia; Nigeria; Rwanda; Sierra Leone; Tanzania; Togo; Uganda; Zimbabwe	Lesotho; São Tomé and Príncipe; Seychelles; Swaziland

Notes

- Togo were banned from the 2012 and 2013 Africa Cup of Nations tournaments by CAF after they withdrew from the 2010 tournament following a deadly attack on their team bus. Togo appealed to the Court of Arbitration for Sport, with FIFA president Sepp Blatter stepping in to mediate. The ban was subsequently lifted with immediate effect on 14 May 2010, after a meeting of the CAF Executive Committee.
- Did not enter: Comoros, Djibouti, Eritrea, Mauritania, Mauritius and Somalia. South Sudan was not able to enter as qualifying was already in progress when they became a CAF member.

== Preliminary round ==
- Originally scheduled 6–8 and 20–22 January 2012. However, the São Tomé and Príncipe v Lesotho match was postponed from 8 January to 15 January at the request of the Lesotho Football Association due to the unavailability of flights to São Tomé via Libreville.

Team 1	Agg.	Team 2	1st leg	2nd leg
Seychelles	w/o^{1}	Swaziland	—	—
São Tomé and Príncipe	1–0	Lesotho	1–0	0–0

Notes

- Note 1: Swaziland withdrew due to financial reasons. Seychelles advanced to the First round against Congo DR.

15 January 2012
15:30 UTC±0

São Tomé and Príncipe	1–0	Lesotho
Jair 3' (pen.)	Report

Estádio Nacional 12 de Julho, São Tomé
Referee: Serge Soumou (Congo)
22 January 2012
15:00 UTC+2

Lesotho	0–0	São Tomé and Príncipe
	Report

Setsoto Stadium, Maseru
Referee: Bernard Camille (Seychelles)

São Tomé and Príncipe won 1–0 on aggregate and advanced to the First round against Sierra Leone.

== First round ==
- Scheduled 29 February and 15–17 June 2012. The Central African Republic v Egypt match was postponed from 29 February to 30 June at the request of the Egyptian Football Association due to the Port Said Stadium disaster.

Team 1	Agg.	Team 2	1st leg	2nd leg
Ethiopia	1–1 (a)	Benin	0–0	1–1
Rwanda	0–2	Nigeria	0–0	0–2
Congo	3–5	Uganda	3–1	0–4
Burundi	2–2 (a)	Zimbabwe	2–1	0–1
Gambia	2–6	Algeria	1–2	1–4
Kenya	2–2 (a)	Togo	2–1	0–1
São Tomé and Príncipe	4–5	Sierra Leone	2–1	2–4
Guinea-Bissau	0–2	Cameroon	0–1	0–1
Chad	3–4	Malawi	3–2	0–2
Seychelles	0–7	DR Congo	0–4	0–3
Tanzania	2–2 (6–7 p)	Mozambique	1–1	1–1
Egypt	3–4^{2}	Central African Republic	2–3	1–1
Madagascar	1–7	Cape Verde	0–4	1–3
Liberia	1–0	Namibia	1–0	0–0

Notes

- Note 2: Order of legs reversed after original draw.

29 February 2012
16:00 UTC+3

Ethiopia	0–0	Benin
	Report

Addis Ababa Stadium, Addis Ababa
Referee: Sylvester Kirwa (Kenya)
17 June 2012
16:00 UTC+1

Benin	1–1	Ethiopia
Poté 19'	Report	Girma 44'

Stade de l'Amitié, Cotonou
Referee: Bakary Gassama (Gambia)

1–1 on aggregate. Ethiopia won on the away goals rule and advanced to the Second round.

29 February 2012
15:30 UTC+2

Rwanda	0–0	Nigeria
	Report

Stade Régional Nyamirambo, Kigali
Referee: Daniel Bennett (South Africa)
16 June 2012
16:00 UTC+1

Nigeria	2–0	Rwanda
I. Uche 9'; Musa 56'	Report

U. J. Esuene Stadium, Calabar
Referee: Noumandiez Doué (Ivory Coast)

Nigeria won 2–0 on aggregate and advanced to the Second round.

29 February 2012
15:30 UTC+1

Congo	3–1	Uganda
N'Guessi 1'; Lépicier 77' (pen.); Moussilou 85'	Report	Sserumaga 29'

Stade Municipal, Pointe-Noire
Referee: Néant Alioum (Cameroon)
16 June 2012
16:00 UTC+3

Uganda	4–0	Congo
Mwesigwa 33'; Walusimbi 51' (pen.); Massa 63'; Okwi 86'	Report

National Stadium, Kampala
Referee: Bouchaïb El Ahrach (Morocco)

Uganda won 5–3 on aggregate and advanced to the Second round.

29 February 2012
15:30 UTC+2

Burundi	2–1	Zimbabwe
Mavugo 46'; Nahayo 90+5'	Report	Musona 60'

Prince Louis Rwagasore Stadium, Bujumbura
Referee: Khalid Abdel Rahman (Sudan)
17 June 2012
15:00 UTC+2

Zimbabwe	1–0	Burundi
Musona 36'	Report

National Sports Stadium, Harare
Referee: Eric Otogo-Castane (Gabon)

2–2 on aggregate. Zimbabwe won on the away goals rule and advanced to the Second round.

29 February 2012
16:30 UTC±0

Gambia	1–2	Algeria
M. Ceesay 27'	Report	Yahia 56'; Feghouli 58'

Independence Stadium, Bakau
Referee: Koman Coulibaly (Mali)
15 June 2012
20:30 UTC+1

Algeria	4–1	Gambia
Kadir 1'; Slimani 6', 52'; Soudani 65'	Report	Gassama 15'

Stade Mustapha Tchaker, Blida
Referee: Slim Jedidi (Tunisia)

Algeria won 6–2 on aggregate and advanced to the Second round.

29 February 2012
17:00 UTC+3

Kenya	2–1	Togo
Situma 24'; Wanga 66'	Report	Boukari 42'

Nyayo National Stadium, Nairobi
Referee: Rajindraparsad Seechurn (Mauritius)
17 June 2012
15:30 UTC±0

Togo	1–0	Kenya
Gakpé 59'	Report

Stade de Kégué, Lomé
Referee: Néant Alioum (Cameroon)

2–2 on aggregate. Togo won on the away goals rule and advanced to the Second round.

29 February 2012
15:00 UTC±0

São Tomé and Príncipe	2–1	Sierra Leone
Jair 69' (pen.); Lasset 86'	Report	A. Kamara 55'

Estádio Nacional 12 de Julho, São Tomé
Referee: Anthony Raphael (Malawi)
16 June 2012
16:30 UTC±0

Sierra Leone	4–2	São Tomé and Príncipe
K. Kamara 17', 33'; T. Bangura 21', 40'	Report	Jair 2'; José 47'

National Stadium, Freetown
Referee: Ali Lemghaifry (Mauritania)

Sierra Leone won 5–4 on aggregate and advanced to the Second round.

29 February 2012
16:30 UTC±0

Guinea-Bissau	0–1	Cameroon
	Report	Choupo-Moting 90+1'

Estádio 24 de Setembro, Bissau
Referee: Bakary Gassama (Gambia)
16 June 2012
15:30 UTC+1

Cameroon	1–0	Guinea-Bissau
Moukandjo 81'	Report

Ahmadou Ahidjo Stadium, Yaoundé
Referee: Aboubacar Bangoura (Guinea)

Cameroon won 2–0 on aggregate and advanced to the Second round.

29 February 2012
15:00 UTC+1

Chad	3–2	Malawi
Labbo 38'; Djime 45+3', 53'	Report	Nyondo 42', 67'

Stade Omnisports Idriss Mahamat Ouya, N'Djamena
Referee: Noumandiez Doué (Ivory Coast)
16 June 2012
14:30 UTC+2

Malawi	2–0	Chad
J. Banda 31'; Kamwendo 73'	Report

Kamuzu Stadium, Blantyre
Referee: Hamada Nampiandraza (Madagascar)

Malawi won 4–3 on aggregate and advanced to the Second round.

29 February 2012
17:30 UTC+4

Seychelles	0–4	DR Congo
	Report	Kaluyituka 11', 47'; Mputu 28'; Basilua 90'

Stade Linité, Victoria
Referee: Aboubacar Bangoura (Guinea)
17 June 2012
15:30 UTC+1

DR Congo	3–0	Seychelles
Mbokani 38'; Issama 45'; Kanda 84'	Report

Stade des Martyrs, Kinshasa
Referee: Fredrick Kayindi-Ngobi (Uganda)

Congo DR won 7–0 on aggregate and advanced to the Second round.

29 February 2012
16:00 UTC+3

Tanzania	1–1	Mozambique
Kazimoto 42'	Report	Clésio 23'

Benjamin Mkapa National Stadium, Dar es Salaam
Referee: Mohamed Farouk Mahmoud (Egypt)
17 June 2012
15:00 UTC+2

Mozambique	1–1	Tanzania
Sitoe 8'	Report	Morris 89'
Penalties
Carlitos (penalty missed); Mexer (penalty missed); Miro (penalty scored); Whiskey (penalty scored); Paíto (penalty scored); Clésio (penalty scored); Zainadine (penalty scored); Telinho (penalty scored); Domingues (penalty scored)	7–6	(penalty missed) Morris; (penalty scored) Maftah; (penalty scored) Nditi; (penalty missed) Yondani; (penalty scored) Kapombe; (penalty scored) Bocco; (penalty scored) Domayo; (penalty scored) Ngassa; (penalty missed) Samatta

Estádio do Zimpeto, Maputo
Referee: Daniel Bennett (South Africa)

2–2 on aggregate. Mozambique won the penalty shootout and advanced to the Second round.

15 June 2012
20:00 UTC+2

Egypt	2–3	Central African Republic
Zidan 10'; Salah 47'	Report	Momi 25', 62'; Manga 69'

Borg El Arab Stadium, Alexandria
Referee: Djamel Haimoudi (Algeria)
30 June 2012
15:00 UTC+1

Central African Republic	1–1	Egypt
Kéthévoama 23'	Report	Moteab 72'

Barthelemy Boganda Stadium, Bangui
Referee: Badara Diatta (Senegal)

Central African Republic won 4–3 on aggregate and advanced to the Second round.

29 February 2012
14:30 UTC+3

Madagascar	0–4	Cape Verde
	Report	Ryan 11'; Dady 38'; F. Varela 77'; T. Varela 82'

Mahamasina Municipal Stadium, Antananarivo
Referee: Janny Sikazwe (Zambia)
16 June 2012
16:30 UTC−1

Cape Verde	3–1	Madagascar
Ryan 9', 81'; Djaniny 55'	Report	Voavy 83'

Estádio da Várzea, Praia
Referee: Boureima Attama (Niger)

Cape Verde won 7–1 on aggregate and advanced to the Second round.

29 February 2012
16:00 UTC±0

Liberia	1–0	Namibia
Williams 67'	Report

Antoinette Tubman Stadium, Monrovia
Referee: Eric Otogo-Castane (Gabon)
16 June 2012
18:00 UTC+1

Namibia	0–0	Liberia
	Report

Independence Stadium, Windhoek
Referee: Janny Sikazwe (Zambia)

Liberia won 1–0 on aggregate and advanced to the Second round.

== Second round ==
=== Seeding ===
The 30 teams which qualified for the second round were ranked based on their performances during the last three Africa Cup of Nations, i.e. the 2008, 2010, and 2012 editions. For each of the last three African Cup of Nations final tournaments, the following system of points was adopted for the qualified countries:

Classification	Points awarded
Winner	7
Runner-up	5
Losing semi-finalists	3
Losing quarter-finalists	2
Eliminated in 1st round	1

Moreover, a weighted coefficient on points was given to each of the last three editions of the Africa Cup of Nations as follows:

- 2012 edition: points to be multiplied by 3
- 2010 edition: points to be multiplied by 2
- 2008 edition: points to be multiplied by 1

If two countries were equal in the number of points in the above classification, the number of points that they accumulated throughout all their matches played in the last three final tournaments of the CAN determined their ranking (on the basis of 3 points for a win, 1 point for a draw and 0 for a match lost).

The teams were divided into two pots based on the ranking. Each tie contained one team from each pot. The order of legs for each tie was determined by draw.

Pot 1	Pot 2
1. Zambia (26 pts); 2. Ghana (22 pts); 3. Ivory Coast (22 pts); 4. Mali (12 pts); 5. Tunisia (10 pts); 6. Cameroon (9 pts); 7. Angola (9 pts); 8. Gabon (8 pts); 9. Nigeria (8 pts); 10. Sudan (7 pts); 11. Equatorial Guinea (6 pts); 12. Algeria (6 pts); 13. Guinea (5 pts); 14. Burkina Faso (5 pts); 15. Morocco (4 pts)	16. Senegal (4 pts); 17. Libya (3 pts); 18. Niger (3 pts); 19. Botswana (3 pts); 20. Malawi (2 pts); 21. Mozambique (2 pts); 22. Togo (2 pts); 23. Cape Verde (0 pts); 24. Central African Republic (0 pts); 25. DR Congo (0 pts); 26. Ethiopia (0 pts); 27. Liberia (0 pts); 28. Sierra Leone (0 pts); 29. Uganda (0 pts); 30. Zimbabwe (0 pts)

=== Matches ===
- Scheduled 7–9 September and 12–14 October 2012.

Team 1	Agg.	Team 2	1st leg	2nd leg
Mali	7–1	Botswana	3–0	4–1
Zimbabwe	3–3 (a)	Angola	3–1	0–2
Ghana	3–0	Malawi	2–0	1–0
Liberia	3–8	Nigeria	2–2	1–6
Zambia	1–1 (9–8 p)	Uganda	1–0	0–1
Cape Verde	3–2	Cameroon	2–0	1–2
Mozambique	2–4	Morocco	2–0	0–4
Sierra Leone	2–2 (a)	Tunisia	2–2	0–0
Guinea	1–2	Niger	1–0	0–2
Sudan	5–5 (a)	Ethiopia	5–3	0–2
Libya	0–3	Algeria	0–1^{3}	0–2
Ivory Coast	6–2	Senegal	4–2	2–0^{4}
DR Congo	5–2	Equatorial Guinea	4–0	1–2
Gabon	2–3	Togo	1–1	1–2
Central African Republic	2–3	Burkina Faso	1–0	1–3

Notes

- Note 3: Libya v Algeria played in neutral venue of Morocco due to the political situation in Libya.
- Note 4: Senegal v Ivory Coast was abandoned with 15 minutes to go, after the crowd started to riot. The result was confirmed as 2–0 in favor of Ivory Coast by the CAF.

8 September 2012
17:00 UTC±0

Mali	3–0	Botswana
Diabaté 27' (pen.); N'Diaye 59'; Maïga 77'	Report

Stade 26 Mars, Bamako
Referee: Slim Jedidi (Tunisia)
13 October 2012
15:00 UTC+2

Botswana	1–4	Mali
Ohilwe 90'	Report	Diabaté 29'; Maïga 60'; Samassa 77'; M. K. Traore 85'

Lobatse Stadium, Lobatse
Referee: Hamada Nampiandraza (Madagascar)

Mali won 7–1 on aggregate and qualified for the 2013 Africa Cup of Nations.

9 September 2012
15:00 UTC+2

Zimbabwe	3–1	Angola
Mateus 4' (o.g.); Billiat 21'; Gutu 35'	Report	Djalma 56'

Rufaro Stadium, Harare
Referee: Hamada Nampiandraza (Madagascar)
14 October 2012
16:00 UTC+1

Angola	2–0	Zimbabwe
Manucho 5', 7'	Report

Estádio 11 de Novembro, Luanda
Referee: Sylvester Kirwa (Kenya)

3–3 on aggregate. Angola won on the away goals rule and qualified for the 2013 Africa Cup of Nations.

8 September 2012
15:30 UTC±0

Ghana	2–0	Malawi
Atsu 8'; Annan 53'	Report

Accra Sports Stadium, Accra
Referee: Mohamed Benouza (Algeria)
13 October 2012
14:30 UTC+2

Malawi	0–1	Ghana
	Report	Acquah 4'

Civo Stadium, Lilongwe
Referee: Khalid Abdel Rahman (Sudan)

Ghana won 3–0 on aggregate and qualified for the 2013 Africa Cup of Nations.

8 September 2012
18:00 UTC±0

Liberia	2–2	Nigeria
O. Roberts 5'; Oliseh 66'	Report	Igiebor 22'; I. Uche 26' (pen.)

National Complex, Paynesville
Referee: Koman Coulibaly (Mali)
13 October 2012
16:00 UTC+1

Nigeria	6–1	Liberia
Ambrose 1'; Musa 38'; Moses 48', 88'; Mikel 50' (pen.); I. Uche 72'	Report	Wleh 80'

U. J. Esuene Stadium, Calabar
Referee: Daniel Bennett (South Africa)

Nigeria won 8–3 on aggregate and qualified for the 2013 Africa Cup of Nations.

8 September 2012
15:00 UTC+2

Zambia	1–0	Uganda
C. Katongo 18'	Report

Levy Mwanawasa Stadium, Ndola
Referee: Noumandiez Doué (Ivory Coast)
13 October 2012
16:00 UTC+3

Uganda	1–0	Zambia
Massa 25'	Report
Penalties
Walusimbi (penalty scored); Mwesigwa (penalty missed); Masaba (penalty scored); Onyango (penalty scored); Okwi (penalty scored); Kizza (penalty scored); Mawejje (penalty scored); Oloya (penalty scored); Kizito (penalty scored); Ochan (penalty missed)	8–9	(penalty missed) C. Katongo; (penalty scored) Mayuka; (penalty scored) Chansa; (penalty scored) Sinkala; (penalty scored) Mweene; (penalty scored) F. Katongo; (penalty scored) Sakuwaha; (penalty scored) Kampamba; (penalty scored) Nkausu; (penalty scored) Sunzu

National Stadium, Kampala
Referee: Djamel Haimoudi (Algeria)

1–1 on aggregate. Zambia won the penalty shootout and qualified for the 2013 Africa Cup of Nations.

8 September 2012
16:00 UTC−1

Cape Verde	2–0	Cameroon
Ricardo 15'; Djaniny 61'	Report

Estádio da Várzea, Praia
Attendance: 10,000
Referee: Eric Otogo-Castane (Gabon)
14 October 2012
15:00 UTC+1

Cameroon	2–1	Cape Verde
Emana 22'; Olinga 90+4'	Report	Nhuck 12'

Ahmadou Ahidjo Stadium, Yaoundé
Referee: Gehad Grisha (Egypt)

Cape Verde won 3–2 on aggregate and qualified for the 2013 Africa Cup of Nations.

9 September 2012
15:00 UTC+2

Mozambique	2–0	Morocco
Miro 75'; Domingues 90+3'	Report

Estádio da Machava, Maputo
Referee: Sylvester Kirwa (Kenya)
13 October 2012
20:00 UTC±0

Morocco	4–0	Mozambique
Barrada 39'; Kharja 64' (pen.); El-Arabi 85'; Amrabat 90+4'	Report

Stade de Marrakech, Marrakesh
Referee: Néant Alioum (Cameroon)

Morocco won 4–2 on aggregate and qualified for the 2013 Africa Cup of Nations.

8 September 2012
16:30 UTC±0

Sierra Leone	2–2	Tunisia
Suma 8'; A. Kamara 85'	Report	Gharbi 65'; Msakni 87'

National Stadium, Freetown
Referee: Khalid Abdelrahman (Sudan)
13 October 2012
19:15 UTC+1

Tunisia	0–0	Sierra Leone
	Report

Stade Mustapha Ben Jannet, Monastir
Referee: Ali Lemghaifry (Mauritania)

2–2 on aggregate. Tunisia won on the away goals rule and qualified for the 2013 Africa Cup of Nations.

9 September 2012
17:00 UTC±0

Guinea	1–0	Niger
Yattara 51'	Report

Nongo Stadium, Conakry
Referee: Daniel Bennett (South Africa)
14 October 2012
16:00 UTC+1

Niger	2–0	Guinea
Chikoto 74'; Garba 85'	Report

Stade Général Seyni Kountché, Niamey
Referee: Bakary Gassama (Gambia)

Niger won 2–1 on aggregate and qualified for the 2013 Africa Cup of Nations.

8 September 2012
20:00 UTC+3

Sudan	5–3	Ethiopia
Mudather Karika 7'; Bashir 15'; Mosaab 35'; Muhannad El Tahir 83' (pen.), 90'	Report	Getaneh 14'; Adane 50'; Siyoum 69'

Khartoum Stadium, Khartoum
Referee: Néant Alioum (Cameroon)
14 October 2012
16:00 UTC+3

Ethiopia	2–0	Sudan
Adane 61'; Saladin 64'	Report

Addis Ababa Stadium, Addis Ababa
Referee: Badara Diatta (Senegal)

5–5 on aggregate. Ethiopia won on the away goals rule and qualified for the 2013 Africa Cup of Nations.

9 September 2012
18:00 UTC+1

Libya	0–1	Algeria
	Report	Soudani 88'

Stade Mohammed V, Casablanca (Morocco)^{3}
Referee: Badara Diatta (Senegal)
14 October 2012
20:30 UTC+1

Algeria	2–0	Libya
Soudani 6'; Slimani 7'	Report

Stade Mustapha Tchaker, Blida
Referee: Aboubacar Bangoura (Guinea)

Algeria won 3–0 on aggregate and qualified for the 2013 Africa Cup of Nations.

8 September 2012
17:00 UTC±0

Ivory Coast	4–2	Senegal
Kalou 43'; Gervinho 65'; Drogba 80' (pen.); Gradel 85'	Report	N'Doye 33'; Cissé 60'

Stade Félix Houphouët-Boigny, Abidjan
Referee: Bouchaïb El Ahrach (Morocco)
13 October 2012
18:30 UTC±0

Senegal	0–2 Abandoned^{4}	Ivory Coast
	Report	Drogba 52', 71' (pen.)

Stade Leopold Senghor, Dakar
Referee: Slim Jedidi (Tunisia)

Ivory Coast won 6–2 on aggregate and qualified for the 2013 Africa Cup of Nations.

9 September 2012
15:30 UTC+1

DR Congo	4–0	Equatorial Guinea
Mbokani 56', 80'; Kanda 61'; Ronan 73' (o.g.)	Report

Stade des Martyrs, Kinshasa
Referee: Rajindraparsad Seechurn (Mauritius)
14 October 2012
18:00 UTC+1

Equatorial Guinea	2–1	DR Congo
Judson 23'; Ricardinho 35'	Report	Mulumbu 43'

Estadio de Malabo, Malabo
Referee: Ousmane Fall (Senegal)

Congo DR won 5–2 on aggregate and qualified for the 2013 Africa Cup of Nations.

8 September 2012
15:30 UTC+1

Gabon	1–1	Togo
Cousin 69'	Report	Adebayor 74'

Stade d'Angondjé, Libreville
Referee: Janny Sikazwe (Zambia)
14 October 2012
15:30 UTC±0

Togo	2–1	Gabon
Wome 36'; Adebayor 57'	Report	Aubameyang 80'

Stade de Kégué, Lomé
Referee: Rajindraparsad Seechurn (Mauritius)

Togo won 3–2 on aggregate and qualified for the 2013 Africa Cup of Nations.

8 September 2012
15:00 UTC+1

Central African Republic	1–0	Burkina Faso
Mabidé 21'	Report

Barthelemy Boganda Stadium, Bangui
Referee: Bakary Gassama (Gambia)
14 October 2012
18:00 UTC±0

Burkina Faso	3–1	Central African Republic
A. Traoré 18', 90+6'; Dagano 40' (pen.)	Report	Manga 7'

Stade du 4 Août, Ouagadougou
Referee: Bouchaïb El Ahrach (Morocco)

Burkina Faso won 3–2 on aggregate and qualified for the 2013 Africa Cup of Nations.

== Goalscorers ==
3 goals

- (Algeria) Islam Slimani
- (Algeria) Hillal Soudani
- (Cape Verde) Ryan Mendes
- (Ivory Coast) Didier Drogba
- (Democratic Republic of the Congo) Dieumerci Mbokani
- (Ethiopia) Adane Girma
- (Nigeria) Ikechukwu Uche
- (São Tomé and Príncipe) Jair Nunes

2 goals

- (Angola) Manucho
- (Burkina Faso) Alain Traoré
- (Cape Verde) Djaniny
- (Central African Republic) David Manga
- (Central African Republic) Hilaire Momi
- (Chad) Leger Djime
- (Democratic Republic of the Congo) Dioko Kaluyituka
- (Democratic Republic of the Congo) Déo Kanda
- (Malawi) Atusaye Nyondo
- (Mali) Cheick Diabaté
- (Mali) Modibo Maïga
- (Nigeria) Ahmed Musa
- (Nigeria) Victor Moses
- (Sierra Leone) Teteh Bangura
- (Sierra Leone) Kei Kamara
- (Sudan) Muhannad Tahir
- (Togo) Emmanuel Adebayor
- (Uganda) Geoffrey Massa
- (Zimbabwe) Knowledge Musona

1 goal

- (Algeria) Sofiane Feghouli
- (Algeria) Foued Kadir
- (Algeria) Antar Yahia
- (Angola) Djalma Campos
- (Benin) Mickaël Poté
- (Burkina Faso) Moumouni Dagano
- (Burundi) Laudy Mavugo
- (Burundi) Valery Nahayo
- (Botswana) Mmusa Ohilwe
- (Cameroon) Eric Maxim Choupo-Moting
- (Cameroon) Achille Emaná
- (Cameroon) Benjamin Moukandjo
- (Cameroon) Fabrice Olinga
- (Cape Verde) Dady
- (Cape Verde) Nhuck
- (Cape Verde) Ricardo
- (Cape Verde) Fernando Varela
- (Cape Verde) Toni Varela
- (Central African Republic) Foxi Kéthévoama
- (Central African Republic) Vianney Mabidé
- (Central African Republic) David Manga
- (Chad) Mahamat Labbo
- (Democratic Republic of the Congo) Jérémie Basilua
- (Democratic Republic of the Congo) Mpeko Issama
- (Democratic Republic of the Congo) Trésor Mputu
- (Democratic Republic of the Congo) Youssouf Mulumbu
- (Republic of the Congo) Matt Moussilou
- (Republic of the Congo) Fabrice N'Guessi
- (Ivory Coast) Gervinho
- (Ivory Coast) Max Gradel
- (Ivory Coast) Salomon Kalou
- (Egypt) Emad Moteab
- (Egypt) Mohamed Salah
- (Egypt) Mohamed Zidan
- (Equatorial Guinea) Judson
- (Equatorial Guinea) Ricardinho
- (Ethiopia) Getaneh Kebede
- (Ethiopia) Saladin Said
- (Ethiopia) Seyoum Tesfaye
- (Gabon) Pierre-Emerick Aubameyang
- (Gabon) Daniel Cousin
- (The Gambia) Momodou Ceesay
- (The Gambia) Saihou Gassama
- (Ghana) Afriyie Acquah
- (Ghana) Anthony Annan
- (Ghana) Christian Atsu
- (Guinea) Mohamed Yattara
- (Kenya) James Situma
- (Kenya) Allan Wanga
- (Liberia) Sekou Oliseh
- (Liberia) Omega Roberts
- (Liberia) Dioh Williams
- (Liberia) Patrick Wleh
- (Madagascar) Paulin Voavy
- (Malawi) John Banda
- (Malawi) Joseph Kamwendo
- (Mali) Mahamadou N'Diaye
- (Mali) Mamadou Samassa
- (Mali) Mohamed Kalilou Traoré
- (Mozambique) Clésio Baúque
- (Mozambique) Domingues
- (Mozambique) Miro
- (Mozambique) Jerry Sitoe
- (Morocco) Nordin Amrabat
- (Morocco) Abdelaziz Barrada
- (Morocco) Youssef El-Arabi
- (Morocco) Houssine Kharja
- (Niger) Mohamed Chikoto
- (Niger) Issoufou Boubacar Garba
- (Nigeria) Efe Ambrose
- (Nigeria) Nosa Igiebor
- (Nigeria) John Obi Mikel
- (São Tomé and Príncipe) José
- (São Tomé and Príncipe) Lasset
- (Senegal) Papiss Cissé
- (Senegal) Dame N'Doye
- (Sierra Leone) Alhaji Kamara
- (Sierra Leone) Alhassan Kamara
- (Sierra Leone) Medo Kamara
- (Sierra Leone) Sheriff Suma
- (Sudan) Mohamed Ahmed Bashir
- (Sudan) Mudathir El Tahir
- (Sudan) Mosaab Omer
- (Tanzania) Mwinyi Kazimoto
- (Tanzania) Aggrey Morris
- (Togo) Razak Boukari
- (Togo) Serge Gakpé
- (Togo) Dové Wome
- (Tunisia) Fateh Gharbi
- (Tunisia) Youssef Msakni
- (Uganda) Andrew Mwesigwa
- (Uganda) Emmanuel Okwi
- (Uganda) Mike Sserumaga
- (Uganda) Godfrey Walusimbi
- (Zambia) Christopher Katongo
- (Zimbabwe) Khama Billiat
- (Zimbabwe) Archieford Gutu

1 own goal

- (Angola) Mateus Galiano da Costa (playing against Zimbabwe)
- (Equatorial Guinea) Ronan Carolino Falcão (playing against DR Congo)
