= Peter D. Gerakaris =

American interdisciplinary artist

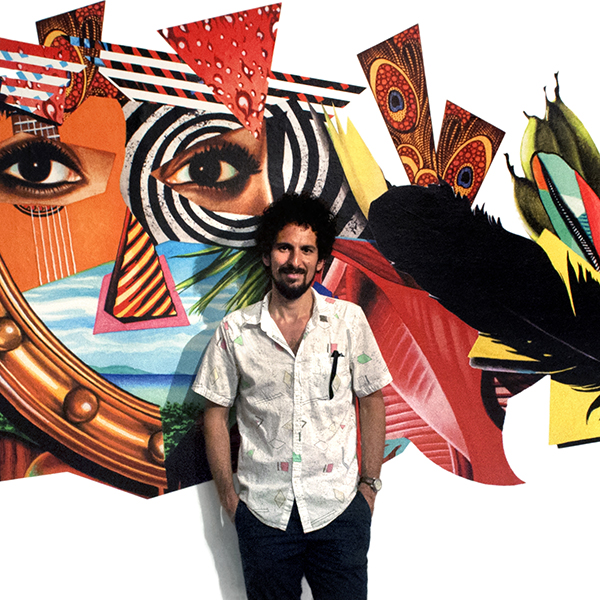
Peter D. Gerakaris in front of Tropicália Installation

Peter D. Gerakaris (born 1981) is an American interdisciplinary artist. His work often addresses nature-culture themes through installations, paintings, works on paper, and origami accordion sculptures.

== Biography ==
He was born in Lebanon, New Hampshire, to Mary and Dimitri Gerakaris. Dimitri is an artist-blacksmith who co-founded ABANA and has created many public art commissions. Peter Gerakaris received a BFA from Cornell University's College of Architecture, Art, & Planning in 2003 and an MFA from Hunter College of the City University of New York in 2009.

== Career ==
Peter D. Gerakaris' artwork has been exhibited in both solo and group shows around the globe at the Mykonos Biennale, Wave Hill, the Bronx Museum of the Arts, the iSolAIR Program in collaboration with the U.S. Embassy Praia (Cape Verde), and the National Academy Museum and School, in addition to galleries such as the Loretta Howard Gallery (NYC), the Daniel Weinberg Gallery (Los Angeles), and Gallery Nine5 (NYC). His artwork is included in notable permanent collections such as the National Museum of Wildlife Art, the U.S. Department of State Art in Embassies Program (Libreville, Gabon), the Schomburg Center, the Warwick Hotel Paradise Island (Bahamas), the Waskowmium and Citibank, in addition to many private collections.

== Commissions ==
Gerakaris has created large-scale, site-specific installations for Cornell Tech to commemorate the campus groundbreaking on Roosevelt Island, the Warwick Hotel Paradise Island Permanent Collection (Bahamas), the Surrey Hotel's private rooftop garden (the Denihan Hospitality Group) for Frieze Week New York (2016), and Bergdorf Goodman Building windows on Fifth Avenue in NYC curated by Linda Fargo and Kyle DeWoody. He has also been awarded a large-scale public art commission to be permanently installed at PS101 (Brooklyn) in 2018 through the NYC Department of Cultural Affairs Percent for Art Program.
