= Fateh Gharbi =

Tunisian footballer

Fateh Gharbi, commonly called Fatah Ghari (Arabic: فاتح الغربي; born 12 March 1983) is a Tunisian former professional footballer who played as a left-back for CS Sfaxien in the Tunisian Ligue Professionnelle 1. He made nine appearances for the Tunisia national team, also appearing at the 2013 Africa Cup of Nations.

== Career statistics ==
Scores and results list Tunisia's goal tally first, score column indicates score after each Gharbi goal.

List of international goals scored by Fateh Gharbi
No.	Date	Venue	Opponent	Score	Result	Competition
1	8 September 2012	National Stadium, Freetown, Sierra Leone	Sierra Leone	1–1	2–2	2013 Africa Cup of Nations qualification

== Honours ==
CS Sfaxien

- CAF Confederation Cup: 2007, 2008

Tunisia

- African Nations Championship: 2011
