= Yakabaşı =

Yakabaşı can refer to:

- Yakabaşı, Abana
- Yakabaşı, Gümüşova
