= Akçam =

Akçam may refer to:

== People ==
- Alper Akçam, Turkish footballer
- Berke Akçam (born 2002), Turkish hurdler
- Taner Akçam, Turkish historian

== Places ==
- Akçam, Abana, a village in Turkey
- Akçam, Köprüköy
