= Altıkulaç =

Altıkulaç can refer to:

- Altıkulaç, Abana, a village in Turkey
- Altıkulaç, Çan
- Altıkulaç Sarcophagus, a 4th-century sarcophagus
