= Ricardo Pereira =

Ricardo Pereira may refer to:

- Ricardo Pereira (actor) (born 1979), Portuguese actor, model and television presenter
- Ricardo (footballer, born 1976) (Ricardo Alexandre Martins Soares Pereira), retired Portuguese footballer
- Ricardo Pereira (footballer, born 1993) (Ricardo Domingos Barbosa Pereira), Portuguese footballer also known as Ricardo
- Joca (footballer, born 1981) (Ricardo Jorge da Silva Pinto Pereira), retired Portuguese footballer
- Ricardo Martins Pereira (born 1986), commonly known as Ricardinho, Brazilian footballer
