= Denizbükü, Abana =

Village in Turkey

Denizbükü
- Village
- Location in Turkey
- Coordinates: 41.967°N 34.102°E
- Country: Turkey
- Province: Kastamonu
- District: Abana
- Population (2021): 79
- Time zone: UTC+3 (TRT)

Denizbükü is a village in the Abana District of Kastamonu Province in Turkey. Its population is 79 (2021).
