= Çampınar, Abana =

Çampınar
- Village
- Location in Turkey
- Coordinates: 41.971°N 34.059°E
- Country: Turkey
- Province: Kastamonu
- District: Abana
- Population (2021): 53
- Time zone: UTC+3 (TRT)

Çampınar is a village in the Abana District of Kastamonu Province in Turkey. Its population is 53 (2021).
