= Pelayo Eribo =

Equatoguinean footballer and politician

Personal information
- Full name: Pelayo Eribo Cubacuba (Note: He has been referred to as Pelayo Eribo Kubakuba.)
- Date of birth: 21 December 1975 (age 50)
- Place of birth: Malabo, Equatorial Guinea
- Position: Striker

International career
Years	Team	Apps	(Gls)
1999–2000	Equatorial Guinea	7	(2)

Pelayo Eribo Cubacuba (born 21 December 1975) is an Equatorial Guinean politician and retired footballer who played as a striker for the Equatorial Guinea national team.

== Football career ==
=== International career ===
Eribo played for his national team in the 1999 UNIFAC Cup and the 2002 FIFA World Cup qualification.

==== International goals ====
#	Date	Venue	Opponent	Score	Result	Competition
1	11 November 1999	Stade Omnisports, Libreville, Gabon	Central African Republic	2 – 1	4 – 2	1999 UNIFAC Cup
2	11 November 1999	Stade Omnisports, Libreville, Gabon	Central African Republic	4 – 2	4 – 2	1999 UNIFAC Cup

== Political career ==
Later, Eribo entered to the Equatoguinean political and was appointed Private Secretary to the Prime Minister and Head of Government.
