= Yemeni, Abana =

Village in Turkey

Yemeni
- Village
- Location in Turkey
- Coordinates: 41°56′54″N 34°04′46″E
- Country: Turkey
- Province: Kastamonu
- District: Abana
- Population (2021): 95
- Time zone: UTC+3 (TRT)

Yemeni is a village in the Abana District of Kastamonu Province in Turkey. Its population is 95 (2021).
