= Judson (name) =

Judson is both a surname and a masculine given name. It is a patronymic derived from the first name "Judd" or "Jutt", a hypocorism for "Jordan".

Notable people with the name include:

== Surname ==
- Adoniram Judson (1788–1850), the first American missionary abroad
- Alice Judson (1876–1948), American painter
- Andrew T. Judson (1784–1853), Connecticut politician
- Ann Hasseltine Judson (1789–1826), America's first female Baptist foreign missionary
- Arthur Judson (1881–1975), American orchestra manager, artists' manager
- Edward Judson (theologian) (1844–1914), American Baptist clergyman
- Edward Zane Carroll Judson, Sr. a.k.a. Ned Buntline (1821–1886), American publisher, journalist, writer and publicist
- Harry Pratt Judson (1849–1927)
- Horace Freeland Judson (1931–2011), historian of molecular biology
- Howie Judson (1925–2020), American baseball player
- Joseph Judson (1619–1690), Connecticut settler, local official and militia officer
- Margaret Judson (born 1987), American actress
- Margaret Atwood Judson (1899–1991), American historian
- Olivia Judson (born 1970), evolutionary biologist and science writer
- Pieter Judson (born 1956), American historian
- Pothuraju Judson, Indian entomologist
- Thomas Judson (1857–1908), Wales international rugby player
- Whitcomb L. Judson (1846–1909), invented the zip fastener

== Given name ==
- Judson Birza (born 1989), television personality and contestant on Survivor: Nicaragua
- Judson Canfield (1759–1840), American politician and judge
- Judson Leroy Day (1877-1944), American dentist and politician
- Judson Augusto do Bonfim Santos, also known as Judson (footballer, born 1992), Brazilian-Equatoguinean footballer
- Judson Flint (1957–2018), American football player
- Judson Hall (1855–1938), American politician
- Judson G. Hart, American politician
- Judson Hill (born 1959), American politician
- Judson Laipply (born 1976), motivational speaker and comedian best known through YouTube
- Judson LaMoure, (1839–1918), American politician
- Judson Pratt (1916–2002), American film, television and theatre actor
- Judson Prentice (1810–1886), American politician
- Judson Procyk (1931-2001), third Metropolitan Archbishop of the Byzantine Catholic Metropolitan Church of Pittsburgh
- Judson Silva Tavares, also known as Judson (footballer, born 1993), Brazilian footballer
