= Elmaçukuru, Abana =

Village in Turkey

Elmaçukuru
- Village
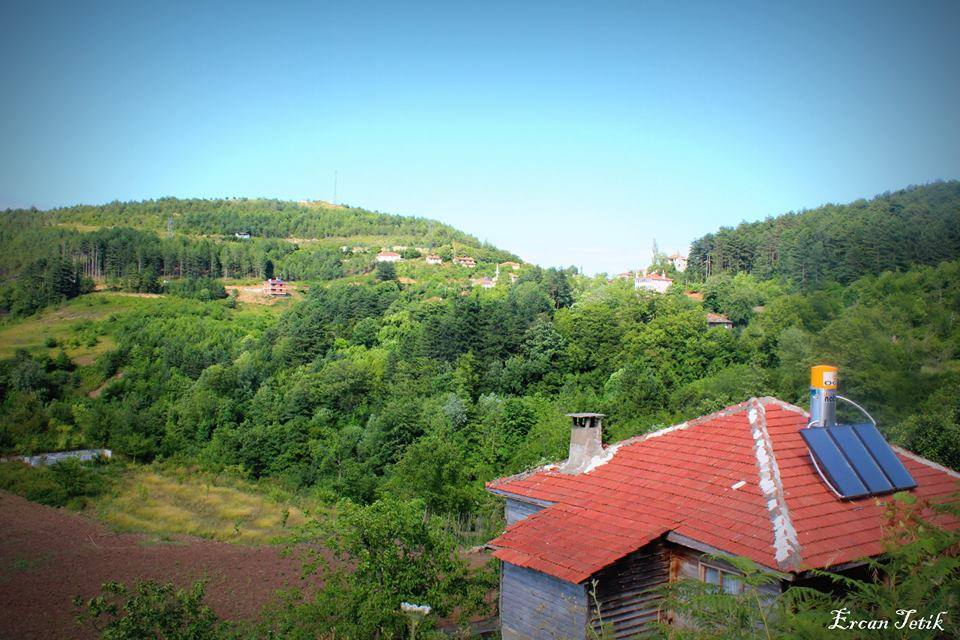

- Location within Turkey
- Coordinates: 41.941°N 34.069°E
- Country: Turkey
- Province: Kastamonu
- District: Abana
- Population (2021): 49
- Time zone: UTC+3 (TRT)

Elmaçukuru is a village in the Abana District of Kastamonu Province in Turkey. Its population is 49 (2021).
