= Henri Antchouet =

Gabonese footballer (born 1979)

Personal information
- Full name: Henri Arnaud Antchouet Rebienot
- Date of birth: 2 August 1979 (age 47)
- Place of birth: Libreville, Gabon
- Height: 1.73 m (5 ft 8 in)
- Position: Striker

Youth career
- 1994–1998: FC 105 Libreville

Senior career*
| Years | Team | Apps | (Gls) |
| 1998–1999 | FC 105 Libreville | | |
| 1999–2000 | Canon Yaoundé | | |
| 2000–2002 | Leixões | 67 | (25) |
| 2002–2005 | Belenenses | 78 | (31) |
| 2005–2007 | Alavés | 3 | (0) |
| 2006 | → Vitória Guimarães (loan) | 12 | (2) |
| 2006–2007 | → Al Shabab (loan) | 0 | (0) |
| 2007 | → AEL (loan) | 8 | (2) |
| 2009–2010 | Estoril | 19 | (5) |
| 2010–2011 | Moreirense | 30 | (12) |
| 2011–2013 | Churchill Brothers | 47 | (27) |
| 2014 | Bongoville | | |
| 2015 | Gobelins | | |

International career
| 1999–2012 | Gabon | 24 | (3) |
Medal record
Churchill Brothers
| Winner | I-League | 2013 |
- * Club domestic league appearances and goals

Henri Arnaud Antchouet Rebienot (born 2 August 1979), known as Antchouet, is a Gabonese former professional footballer who played as a striker.

Nicknamed "The Arrow" due to his agility, he spent most of his professional career in Portugal and played in five other countries abroad. From 2007 to 2009 he served a ban due to doping.

== Club career ==
Born in Libreville, Antchouet started his career at the age of 15 in local club FC 105 Libreville. After a quick spell in Cameroon he moved to Portugal, first with Leixões (then in the third division), and remained there for the vast majority of the following six years. He have had advanced positions among the top scorers in 2002–03 Primeira Liga with 9 goals, 2003–04 season with 10 goals and 2004–05 season with 12 goals.

Consistent performances for Primeira Liga's Belenenses attracted the attention of Alavés in July 2005, but Antchouet left Spain after only a few months, returning to Portugal with Vitória de Guimarães, on loan.

After a loan in Saudi Arabia, Antchouet joined AEL in Greece, in January 2007, still owned by Alavés, and helped the team win the 2006–07 Greek Cup, netting the winner against Panathinaikos just eight minutes from time, as a substitute. On 15 June 2007, however, he was given a two-year ban by the Hellenic Football Federation, after testing positive for cocaine.

In August 2009 Antchouet returned to active and Portugal, signing with second division side Estoril. After one season, he was due to change clubs – and countries – again, joining FC U Craiova from Romania in June 2010; however, the deal eventually fell through and he returned to the country he had left, moving to Moreirense in division two.

In June 2011 Antchouet signed for Indian club Churchill Brothers, scoring on his debut against Shillong Lajong and finding the net against the same rival on 18 December in a 6–0 routing. He finished the season as joint-sixth top scorer, helping his team to the third position in the I-League.

== International career ==
Antchouet made his senior international debut for Gabon national team on 27 February 1999 against South African in 2000 African Cup of Nations qualification match, which ended as a 4–1 defeat. He scored his first goal against Equatorial Guinea in an international friendly match in 1999.

He has also represented Gabon in competitions like 2000 ACN, 2004 ACN and 2013 African Cup of Nations main stages alongside 2002, 2006 and 2014 FIFA World Cup qualifiers.

Between 1999 and 2012, he appeared in 24 international matches for his country, scoring 3 goals.

== Career statistics ==
=== Club ===
As of 22 November 2013

Appearances and goals by club, season and competition
| Club | Season | League | | | Cup (Note: Includes Copa del Rey, Taça da Liga and Taça de Portugal.) | | Continental (Note: Includes AFC Cup.) | | Total | |
| Club | Season | Division | Apps | Goals | Apps | Goals | Apps | Goals | Apps | Goals |
|---|---|---|---|---|---|---|---|---|---|---|
| Leixões | 2000–01 | Portuguese Second Division | 30 | 13 | 3 | 1 | 0 | 0 | 33 | 14 |
| Leixões | 2001–02 | Portuguese Second Division | 36 | 13 | 8 | 5 | 0 | 0 | 44 | 18 |
| Leixões | 2002–03 | Portuguese Second Division | 0 | 0 | 0 | 0 | 1 | 1 | 1 | 1 |
| Leixões | Total | | 66 | 26 | 11 | 6 | 1 | 1 | 78 | 33 |
| Belenenses | 2002–03 | Primeira Liga | 22 | 9 | 0 | 0 | 0 | 0 | 22 | 9 |
| Belenenses | 2003–04 | Primeira Liga | 31 | 10 | 4 | 0 | 0 | 0 | 35 | 10 |
| Belenenses | 2004–05 | Primeira Liga | 26 | 12 | 0 | 0 | 0 | 0 | 26 | 12 |
| Belenenses | Total | | 79 | 31 | 4 | 0 | 0 | 0 | 83 | 31 |
| Alavés | 2005–06 | La Liga | 3 | 0 | 1 | 0 | 0 | 0 | 4 | 0 |
| Vitória Guimarães (loan) | 2005–06 | Primeira Liga | 12 | 2 | 3 | 1 | 0 | 0 | 15 | 3 |
| Al Shabab (loan) | 2006–07 | Saudi Professional League | 0 | 0 | 0 | 0 | 0 | 0 | 0 | 0 |
| AEL (loan) | 2006–07 | Super League Greece | 8 | 2 | 0 | 0 | 0 | 0 | 8 | 2 |
| Estoril | 2009–10 | Liga de Honra | 19 | 5 | 4 | 1 | 0 | 0 | 23 | 6 |
| Moreirense | 2010–11 | Liga de Honra | 30 | 12 | 5 | 1 | 0 | 0 | 35 | 13 |
| Churchill Brothers | 2011–12 | I-League | 19 | 13 | 0 | 0 | 0 | 0 | 19 | 13 |
| Churchill Brothers | 2012–13 | I-League | 24 | 14 | 0 | 0 | 3 | 0 | 27 | 14 |
| Churchill Brothers | 2013–14 | I-League | 4 | 0 | 0 | 0 | 0 | 0 | 4 | 0 |
| Churchill Brothers | Total | | 47 | 27 | 0 | 0 | 3 | 0 | 50 | 27 |
| Career total | | | 264 | 105 | 28 | 9 | 4 | 1 | 296 | 115 |

=== International ===
Scores and results list Gabon's goal tally first, score column indicates score after each Antchouet goal.

List of international goals scored by Henri Antchouet
| No. | Date | Venue | Opponent | Score | Result | Competition |
|---|---|---|---|---|---|---|
| 1 | 7 November 1999 | Stade Omar Bongo, Libreville, Gabon | Equatorial Guinea | 1–0 | 4–0 | UNIFAC Cup |
| 2 | 14 November 1999 | Stade Omar Bongo, Libreville, Gabon | Chad | 1–0 | 2–0 | UNIFAC Cup |
| 3 | 2 September 2006 | Stade Omar Bongo, Libreville, Gabon | Madagascar | 1–0 | 4–0 | 2008 Africa Cup of Nations qualification |

== Honours ==
Leixões

- Taça de Portugal: runner-up 2001–02
- Supertaça Cândido de Oliveira: runner-up 2002

AEL

- Greek Football Cup: 2006–07

Churchill Brothers

- I-League: 2012–13
- Federation Cup: 2013–14
