= Zé (footballer, born 1991) =

São Tomé and Príncipe footballer

Personal information
- Full name: José da Silva Varela
- Date of birth: 22 December 1991 (age 34)
- Place of birth: São Tomé, São Tomé and Príncipe
- Position: Striker

Team information
- Current team: Sporting Praia Cruz

Youth career
- Escola de Futebol de São Tomé
- Atlético de Alagoinhas

Senior career*
| Years | Team | Apps | (Gls) |
| 2011–2014 | UDRA | | |
| 2015– | Sporting Praia Cruz | | |

International career^{‡}
| 2011– | São Tomé and Príncipe | 14 | (3) |
- * Club domestic league appearances and goals ‡ National team caps and goals as of 26 March 2018

José da Silva Varela (born 22 December 1991), known as Zé, is a São Toméan footballer who plays for Sporting Praia Cruz, which is playing in the São Tomé and Príncipe Championship, as a striker. He is a member of the São Tomé and Príncipe national football team.

== International career ==
=== International goals ===
Scores and results list São Tomé and Príncipe's goal tally first.

| No | Date | Venue | Opponent | Score | Result | Competition |
|---|---|---|---|---|---|---|
| 1. | 16 June 2012 | National Stadium, Freetown, Sierra Leone | Sierra Leone | 2–4 | 2–4 | 2013 Africa Cup of Nations qualification |
| 2. | 26 March 2017 | Mahamasina Municipal Stadium, Antananarivo, Madagascar | Madagascar | 2–3 | 2–3 | 2019 Africa Cup of Nations qualification |
| 3. | 24 March 2018 | Mandela National Stadium, Kampala, Uganda | Uganda | 1–3 | 1–3 | Friendly |
