= Judson College =

Judson College may refer to one of several tertiary institutions:

- Judson College (Alabama), originally named Judson Female Institute
- Judson College at Southeastern, formerly "The College at Southeastern", associated with Southeastern Baptist Theological Seminary.
- Judson College (Mount Palatine, Illinois) (1846–1860)
- Judson University, Elgin, Illinois, called Judson College until 2007
- Judson College, forerunner of University of Yangon, Myanmar

== See also ==
- Judson (disambiguation)
