= Yeşilyuva, Abana =

Village in Turkey

Yeşilyuva
- Village
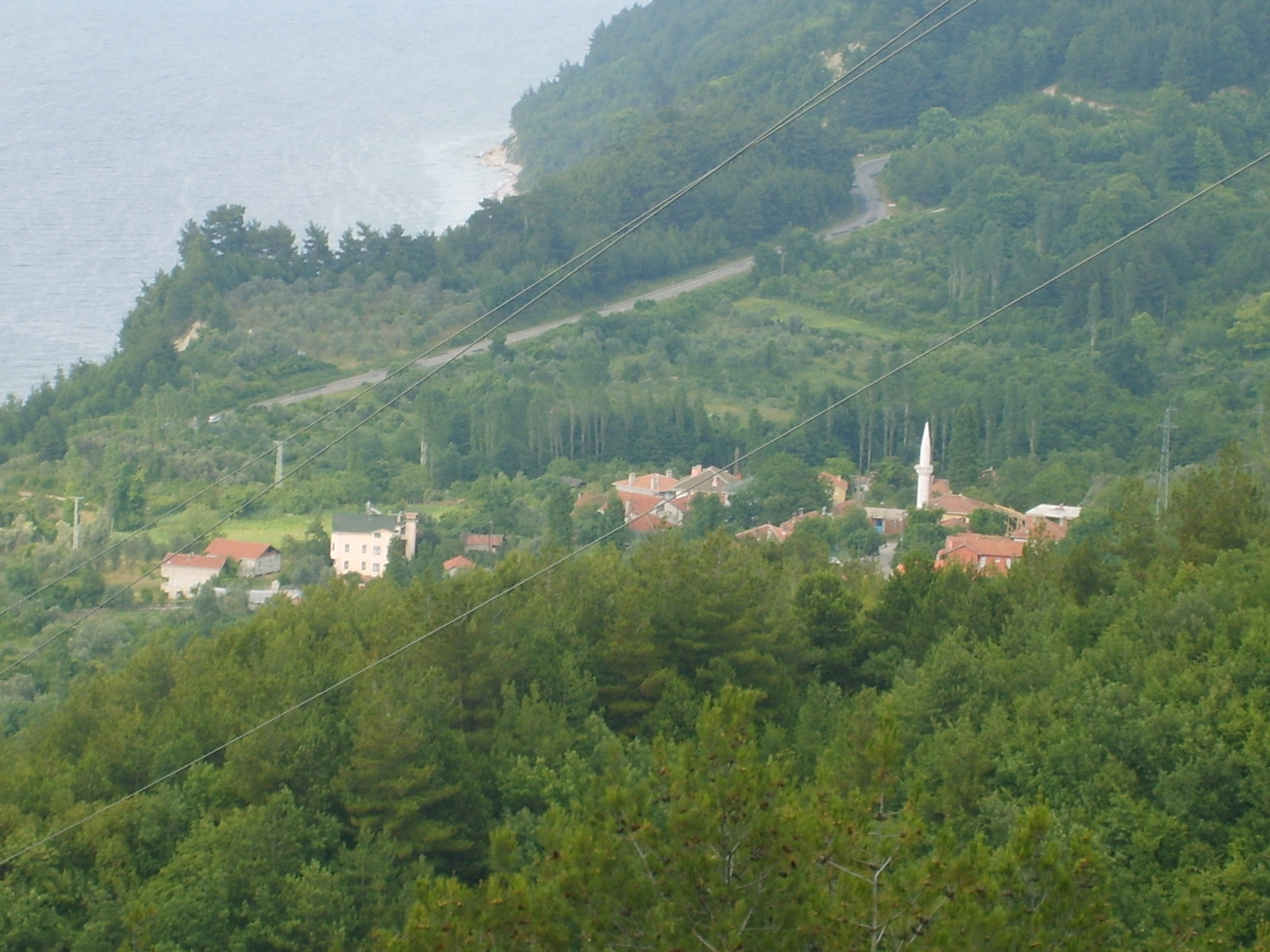

- Location within Turkey
- Coordinates: 41°58′32″N 34°04′17″E
- Country: Turkey
- Province: Kastamonu
- District: Abana
- Population (2021): 46
- Time zone: UTC+3 (TRT)

Yeşilyuva is a village in the Abana District of Kastamonu Province in Turkey. Its population is 46 (2021).
