= Göynükler, Abana =

Village in Turkey

Göynükler
- Village
- Location in Turkey
- Coordinates: 41°57′36″N 34°04′08″E
- Country: Turkey
- Province: Kastamonu
- District: Abana
- Population (2021): 72
- Time zone: UTC+3 (TRT)

Göynükler is a village in the Abana District of Kastamonu Province in Turkey. Its population is 72 (2021).
