= Jair Nunes =

São Tomé and Príncipe footballer

Jair
Personal information
- Full name: Jair Nunes do Espírito Santo
- Date of birth: 15 September 1994 (age 32)
- Place of birth: São Tomé, São Tomé and Príncipe
- Height: 1.76 m (5 ft 9 in)
- Position: Midfielder

Team information
- Current team: Sporting Praia Cruz

Youth career
- Escola de Futebol de São Tomé
- Atlético de Alagoinhas

Senior career*
| Years | Team | Apps | (Gls) |
| 2011–2013 | CD Cruz | 49 | (57) |
| 2013– | Sporting Praia Cruz | | |

International career^{‡}
| 2011– | São Tomé and Príncipe | 6 | (3) |
- * Club domestic league appearances and goals as of 29 February 2012 ‡ National team caps and goals as of 29 February 2012

Jair Nunes do Espírito Santo (born 15 September 1994), also known simply as Jair, is a Santomean international footballer who plays for CD Cruz as a midfielder.

== Career ==
He made his international debut for São Tomé and Príncipe in 2011 against Congo at the first leg of 2014 FIFA World Cup qualification (CAF). He scored his first international goal against Lesotho at 2013 Africa Cup of Nations qualification, netting a penalty kick. He scored his second international goal - also from the penalty spot - against Sierra Leone at the same qualifying.

== International goals ==
| # | Date | Venue | Opponent | Score | Result | Competition |
|---|---|---|---|---|---|---|
| 1 | 15 January 2012 | Estádio Nacional 12 de Julho, São Tomé | Lesotho | 1–0 | 1–0 | 2013 Africa Cup of Nations qualifier |
| 2 | 29 February 2012 | Estádio Nacional 12 de Julho, São Tomé | Sierra Leone | 1–1 | 2–1 | 2013 Africa Cup of Nations qualifier |
| 3 | 16 June 2012 | National Stadium, Freetown | Sierra Leone | 1–0 | 2–4 | 2013 Africa Cup of Nations qualifier |
