= Kadıyusuf, Abana =

Village in Turkey

Kadıyusuf
- Village
- Location in Turkey
- Coordinates: 41°56′54″N 34°03′40″E
- Country: Turkey
- Province: Kastamonu
- District: Abana
- Population (2021): 61
- Time zone: UTC+3 (TRT)

Kadıyusuf is a village in the Abana District of Kastamonu Province in Turkey. Its population is 61 (2021).
