= UNIFAC Cup =

The UNIFAC Cup was a football tournament played in Gabon in 1999. The trophy was named after the then Gabonese president Omar Bongo.

== The matches ==
Originally there were 8 teams, divided into two groups, with the top 2 of each group advancing to the semifinals. However, after Cameroon and DR Congo pulled out, a league format was introduced.

Team	Pld	W	D	L	GF	GA	GD	Pts
Gabon	5	4	1	0	8	0	+8	13
Central African Republic	5	3	0	2	13	8	+5	9
Chad	5	3	0	2	9	6	+3	9
Congo	5	2	2	2	5	7	–2	7
Equatorial Guinea	5	1	0	4	5	11	–6	3
São Tomé and Príncipe	5	1	0	4	2	10	–8	3

- All matches were played in Stade Omar Bongo, Libreville, Gabon.
Nov 7, 1999

Gabon	4–0	Equatorial Guinea
Henri Antchouet 41'; Bruno Mbanangoyé Zita 60'; Alain Souta 78'; Théodore Nzue Nguema 87'

Nov 8, 1999

Chad	1–4	Central African Republic
Oumar Abakar 21'		Francis Gbango 53'; Tati Djimadoum 58'; Armel Oroko 85', 89'

Nov 10, 1999

Congo	2–1	Equatorial Guinea
Rufin Bitsiku 30'; Armel Eouasse 77'		Edesio Ezomo Benda 47'

Nov 10, 1999

Chad	5–0	São Tomé and Príncipe
Robert Lokossimbaye 4', 56', 90'; Mbangningar Krabé 60'; Hisseine Abana 83'

Nov 10, 1999

Gabon	1–0	Central African Republic
Bruno Zita Mbanangoyé 82'

Nov 11, 1999

Congo	0–2	Chad

Nov 11, 1999

Gabon	1–0	São Tomé and Príncipe

Nov 11, 1999

Equatorial Guinea	4–2	Central African Republic
Marcial Owono 2'; Pelayo Eribo 50', 70'; Tomas Nfa 66'		Parfait Kognongué 7'; Nazaire Malo 60'

Nov 12, 1999

Congo	1–0	São Tomé and Príncipe

Nov 13, 1999

Gabon	0–0	Congo

Nov 13, 1999

Chad	1–0	Equatorial Guinea
Robert Lokossimbaye 77'

Nov 13, 1999

São Tomé and Príncipe	0–3	Central African Republic
		Tati Djimadoum 46', 53'; Kévin Tcheka 82' (pen.)

Nov 14, 1999

Central African Republic	4–2	Congo

Nov 14, 1999

São Tomé and Príncipe	2–0	Equatorial Guinea

Nov 14, 1999

Gabon	2–0	Chad
Henri Antchouet 59'; Bruno Mbanangoyé Zita 80'

UNIFAC Cup winners

Gabon
