= Hisseine Abana =

Chadian footballer (born 1983)

Personal information
- Full name: Hisseine Mahamat Abana
- Date of birth: 25 June 1983 (age 43)
- Place of birth: N'Djamena, Chad
- Positions: Forward; midfielder

Senior career*
Years	Team	Apps	(Gls)
-2002	Renaissance		
- Petit Bard

International career^{‡}
1997–2002	Chad	15	(3)
- * Club domestic league appearances and goals ‡ National team caps and goals as of 9 November 2020

Hisseine Abana (born 25 June 1983) is a Chadian former professional football player. He made 15 appearances for the Chad national football team.

== Career ==
Abana started his career in Chadian club Renaissance. He later moved to France, and played for FC Petit Bard in Montpellier.

Abana made his first appearance for the Chad on 25 September 1997, in a match against Bahrain, in a friendly international football tournament held in Tripoli, Libya. He scored his first goal for the national team against Congo on 2 August 1998. He scored his other 2 goals on UNIFAC Cup in 1999 in Gabon. He played 15 matches total for the national team.

== See also ==
- List of Chad international footballers
