= Mosaab Omer =

Sudanese footballer

Personal information
- Full name: Musab Omer Muaaz Musa
- Date of birth: 4 June 1984 (age 42)
- Place of birth: Wad Medani, Sudan
- Height: 1.74 m (5 ft 9 in)
- Positions: Defender; midfielder

Team information
- Current team: Al-Ittihad SC (Wad Madani)
- Number: 6

Senior career*
Years	Team	Apps	(Gls)
2004	Jazeerat Al-Feel SC		
2005-2006	Awooda SC (Wad Madani)		
2007–2008	Al-Ahli SC (Wad Madani)		
2009–2016	Al-Merrikh SC		
2014	Al Ahli SC (Khartoum) (loan)		
2017-2020	Hay Al-Wadi SC		
2020-2021	Arkaweet SC		
2021-2025	Al-Nahda SC (Atbara)		
2025	Al-Hilal SC (Al-Managel)		
2025-	Al-Ittihad SC (Wad Madani)		

International career
2009–2015	Sudan	25	(1)
Medal record
Men's football
Representing Sudan
African Nations Championship
Third place	2011 Sudan
CECAFA Cup
Third place	2011 Tanzania
- * Club domestic league appearances and goals

Musaab Omer Maaz Mussa (born 4 June 1984 in Wad Medani, Sudan) is a Sudanese footballer, who plays for home club Al-Merreikh in Sudanese Premier League and Sudan national football team, as a defender and midfielder. He was called to 2012 Africa Cup of Nations.

== Honours ==
Sudan

- African Nations Championship: 3rd place, 2011
- CECAFA Cup: 3rd place, 2011
