= Yakabaşı, Abana =

Village in Turkey

Yakabaşı
- Village
- Location in Turkey
- Coordinates: 41.968°N 34.092°E
- Country: Turkey
- Province: Kastamonu
- District: Abana
- Population (2021): 72
- Time zone: UTC+3 (TRT)

Yakabaşı is a village in the Abana District of Kastamonu Province in Turkey. Its population is 72 (2021).
