= Abana District =

District of Kastamonu Province, Turkey

- District
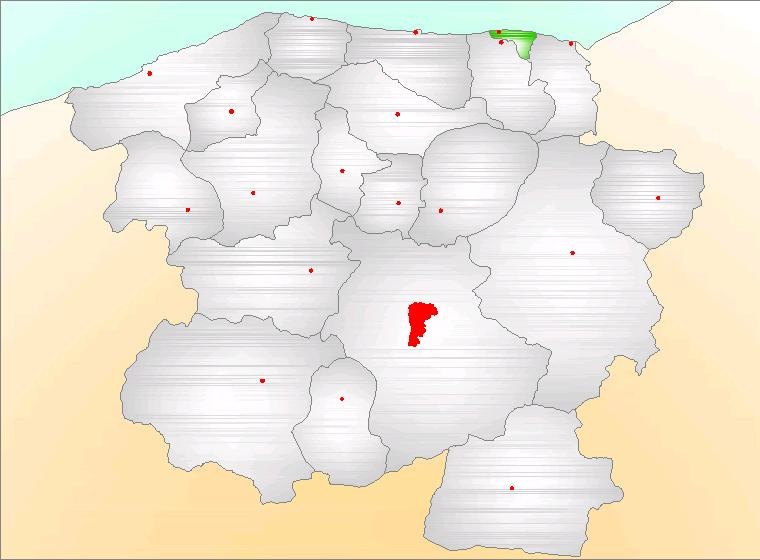
- Map showing Abana District (green) in Kastamonu Province

- Location in Turkey
- Coordinates: 41°58′N 34°01′E
- Country: Turkey
- Province: Kastamonu
- Seat: Abana

Government
  - Kaymakam: Salih Ağar
- Area: 28 km^{2} (11 sq mi)
- Population (2021): 4,027
  - Density: 140/km^{2} (370/sq mi)
- Time zone: UTC+3 (TRT)
- Website: www.abana.gov.tr

Abana District is a district of the Kastamonu Province of Turkey. Its seat is the town of Abana. Its area is 28 km^{2}, and its population is 4,027 (2021). Abana's coastline is 11 km long, of which 7 km is a natural sand beach, making the district a popular summer resort for the region.

== Composition ==
There is one municipality in Abana District:

- Abana

There are 10 villages in Abana District:

- Akçam
- Altıkulaç
- Çampınar
- Denizbükü
- Elmaçukuru
- Göynükler
- Kadıyusuf
- Yakabaşı
- Yemeni
- Yeşilyuva
