= Robert Lokossimbayé =

Chadian footballer (1975–2011)

Personal information
- Full name: Robert Lokossimbayé
- Date of birth: 15 September 1975
- Place of birth: N'Djamena
- Date of death: 12 April 2011 (aged 35)
- Place of death: Moissac
- Positions: Midfielder; striker

Youth career
- AS-LAD

Senior career*
| Years | Team | Apps | (Gls) |
- Postel 2000
| 2002–2003 | Cahors FC | | |
| 2003 | FC 105 Libreville | | |
| 2004–2008 | EF Castel - Moissac | | |

International career^{‡}
| 1999–2000 | Chad | 9 | (9) |
- * Club domestic league appearances and goals ‡ National team caps and goals as of 3 July 2014

Robert Lokossimbayé (15 September 1975 – 12 April 2011) was a Chadian professional football player. He made nine appearances for the Chad national football team and scored 9 goals.

== Career statistics ==
=== International ===
Appearances and goals by national team and year
| National team | Year | Apps | Goals |
|---|---|---|---|
| Chad | 1999 | 5 | 5 |
| Chad | 2000 | 4 | 4 |
| Total | | 9 | 9 |

Scores and results list Chad's goal tally first, score column indicates score after each Lokossimbayé goal.

List of international goals scored by Robert Lokossimbayé
| No. | Date | Venue | Opponent | Score | Result | Competition | Ref. |
|---|---|---|---|---|---|---|---|
| 1 | 10 November 1999 | Stade Omar Bongo, Libreville, Gabon | São Tomé and Príncipe | 1–0 | 5–0 | Friendly | |
| 2 | 10 November 1999 | Stade Omar Bongo, Libreville, Gabon | São Tomé and Príncipe | 2–0 | 5–0 | Friendly | |
| 3 | 10 November 1999 | Stade Omar Bongo, Libreville, Gabon | São Tomé and Príncipe | 5–0 | 5–0 | Friendly | |
| 4 | 11 November 1999 | Stade Omar Bongo, Libreville, Gabon | Congo | 1–0 | 2–0 | Friendly | |
| 5 | 13 November 1999 | Stade Omar Bongo, Libreville, Gabon | Equatorial Guinea | 1–0 | 1–0 | Friendly | |
| 6 | 30 June 2000 | Stade Omnisports Idriss Mahamat Ouya, N'Djamena, Chad | Libya | – | 3–1 | 2002 African Cup of Nations qualification | |
| 7 | 30 June 2000 | Stade Omnisports Idriss Mahamat Ouya, N'Djamena, Chad | Libya | – | 3–1 | 2002 African Cup of Nations qualification | |
| 8 | 30 June 2000 | Stade Omnisports Idriss Mahamat Ouya, N'Djamena, Chad | Libya | – | 3–1 | 2002 African Cup of Nations qualification | |
| 9 | 14 July 2000 | Tripoli Stadium, Tripoli, Libya | Libya | – | 1–3 | 2002 African Cup of Nations qualification | |

== See also ==
- List of Chad international footballers
