= Ricardinho (footballer, born May 1986) =

Equatoguinean footballer

Personal information
- Full name: Ricardo Martins Pereira
- Date of birth: 21 May 1986 (age 40)
- Place of birth: São Paulo, Brazil
- Height: 1.82 m (6 ft 0 in)
- Position: Striker

Team information
- Current team: Icasa

Senior career*
Years	Team	Apps	(Gls)
2008	Bragantino	5	(0)
2012	Clube de Regatas Brasil	33	(3)
- São Bernardo
2014	Mirassol		
2014–	Icasa		

International career^{‡}
2012–2013	Equatorial Guinea	4	(1)
- * Club domestic league appearances and goals ‡ National team caps and goals as of 8 June 2013

Ricardo Martins Pereira commonly known as Ricardinho is a football player who currently plays for Icasa. Ricardinho has been referred to in the Equatorial Guinean press as Ricardo Texeira Ondo.

Born in Brazil, Ricardinho represented Equatorial Guinea in a 2013 Africa Cup of Nations qualification game versus Democratic Republic of the Congo in October 2012. He scored on his international debut in a 2-1 victory over the Congolese side.

== Career statistics ==
=== International ===
Appearances and goals by national team and year
National team	Year	Apps	Goals
Equatorial Guinea	2012	1	1
Equatorial Guinea	2013	3	0
Total		4	1

Scores and results list Equatorial Guinea's goal tally first, score column indicates score after each Ricardinho goal.

List of international goals scored by Ricardinho
No.	Date	Venue	Opponent	Score	Result	Competition	Ref.
1	14 October 2012	Estadio de Malabo, Malabo, Equatorial Guinea	DR Congo	1–0	2–1	2013 Africa Cup of Nations qualification	
