= Waskowmium =

Art collection

The Waskowmium is a collection of artworks in northern Vermont, USA, and "housed at two residences and four other spaces that are exclusively devoted to storing and displaying the collection".

It was founded by Mark S. Waskow. As of 2007, it was reportedly "one of the largest private collections of artworks in [Vermont], [with] a total of 8,000 pieces, much of it produced by Vermonters". It notably includes paintings by Marc Awodey and drawings by Ed Koren.

Media heavily represented in this collection are works on paper, artists' books and other printed materials, collage, assemblage, constructions and works by Vermont-based artists. An archive of materials relating to the contemporary art scene in Vermont and its chronology is also maintained.
