= The Judson =

- U.S. National Register of Historic Places
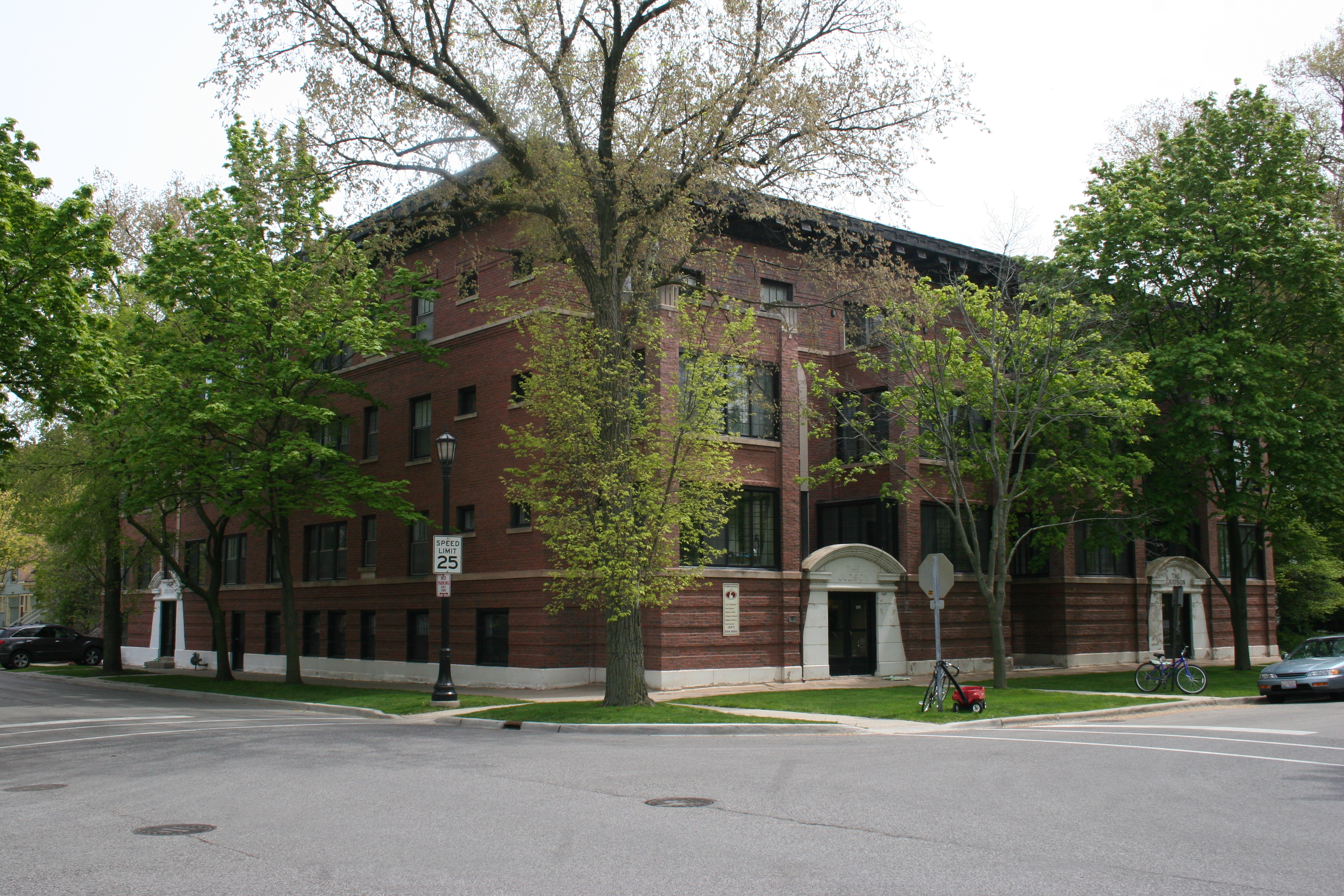
- The Judson in 2012

- Location within Chicago metropolitan area Location within Illinois Location within the United States
- Location: 1243-1249 Judson Ave., Evanston, Illinois
- Coordinates: 42°02′27″N 87°40′35″W
- Area: 0.3 acres (0.12 ha)
- Built: 1911
- Architect: Francis M. Barton
- MPS: Suburban Apartment Buildings in Evanston TR
- NRHP reference No.: 84000998
- Added to NRHP: March 15, 1984

The Judson is a historic apartment building at 1243-1249 Judson Avenue in Evanston, Illinois, US. Built in 1911, the three-story brick building has eighteen units. Architect Francis M. Barton designed the building in a style inspired by the Prairie School. The building's design features segmental arched entrances, egg-and-dart decoration, patterned brickwork with horizontal themes, and overhanging bracketed eaves. The design was initially controversial for leaving no space between the building and the sidewalk, breaking from the Prairie School principle of including green space in front of a recessed building to blend in with nearby single-family homes. Prominent architect and Evanston resident Thomas Tallmadge described the building as "equally oblivious to the rights of neighbors and to the principles of good design" in a 1919 issue of the journal The American Architecture.

The building was added to the National Register of Historic Places on March 15, 1984.
