= Akçam, Abana =

Village in Turkey

Akçam
- Village
- Location in Turkey
- Coordinates: 41.937°N 34.089°E
- Country: Turkey
- Province: Kastamonu
- District: Abana
- Population (2021): 94
- Time zone: UTC+3 (TRT)

Akçam is a village in the Abana District of Kastamonu Province in Turkey. Its population is 94 (2021).
