= Aboubacar Bangoura (referee) =

Guinean football referee

Aboubacar Mario Bangoura (born 21 December 1977) is a Guinean football referee. He referees at the 2014 FIFA World Cup qualifiers.
