= Abana, Kastamonu =

Abana
- Municipality
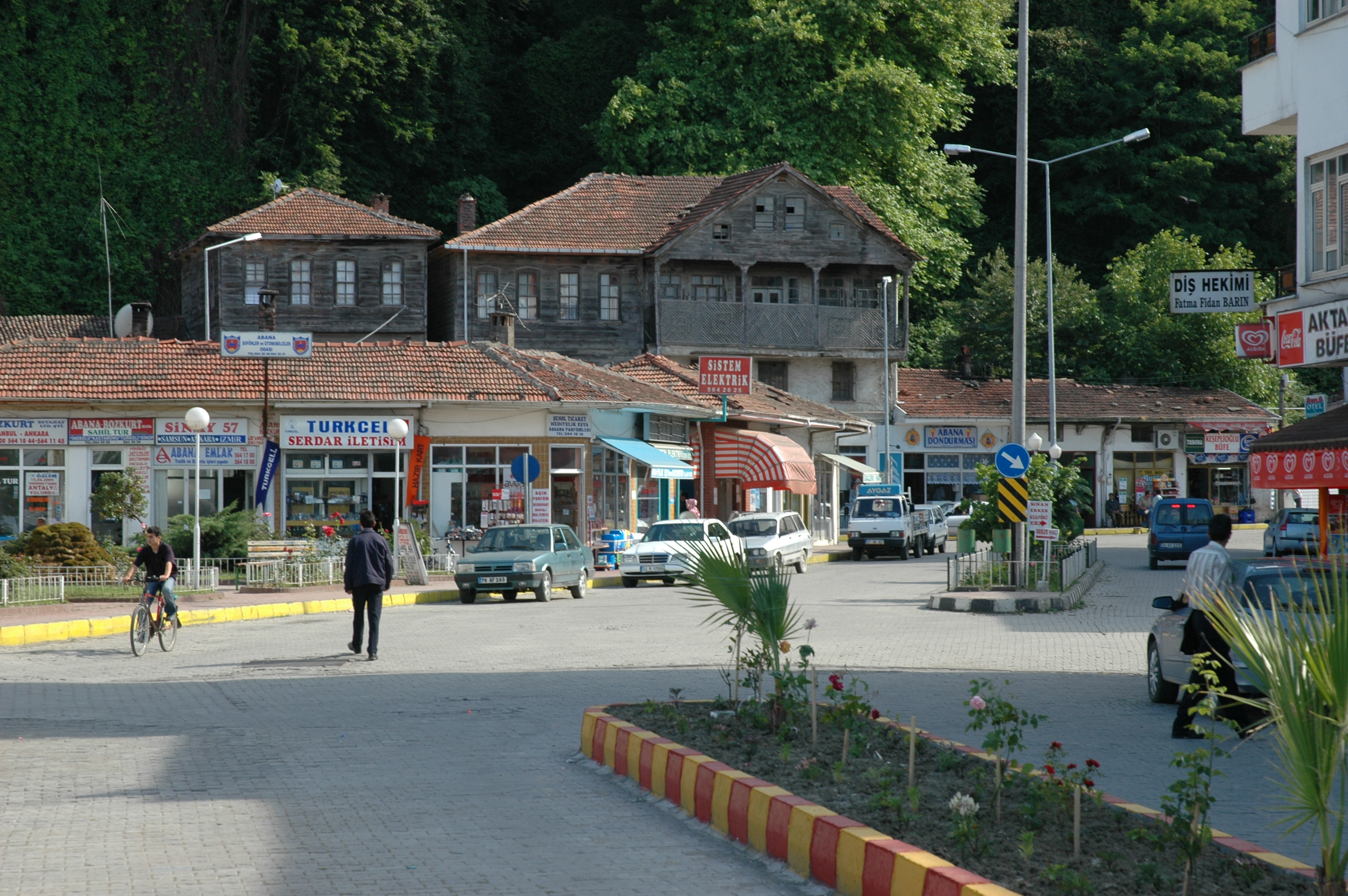

- Location within Turkey
- Coordinates: 41°58′33″N 34°00′41″E
- Country: Turkey
- Province: Kastamonu
- District: Abana

Government
  - Mayor: Seda OYAR (AKP)
- Elevation: 10 m (33 ft)
- Population (2021): 3,317
- Time zone: UTC+3 (TRT)
- Area code: 0366
- Climate: Cfa
- Website: www.abana.bel.tr

Abana is a town in the Kastamonu Province in the Black Sea region of Turkey. It is in the north-eastern part of the province, on the shore of the Black Sea. It is the seat of Abana District. Its population is 3,317 (2021).

== History ==
Abana is the oldest town of Kastamonu, once a part of Paphlagonia, the town was ruled by the Danishmends, the Seljuk Turks, the Jandarid dynasty, and finally Ottomans. It was made a district of the Kastamonu province in 1945. The name might be connected to “Άβώνου τείχος”, Avonou Teichos, in greek.

== Transportation ==
Abana can be easily reached from Kastamonu via Devrakani and Bozkurt.

== Gallery ==
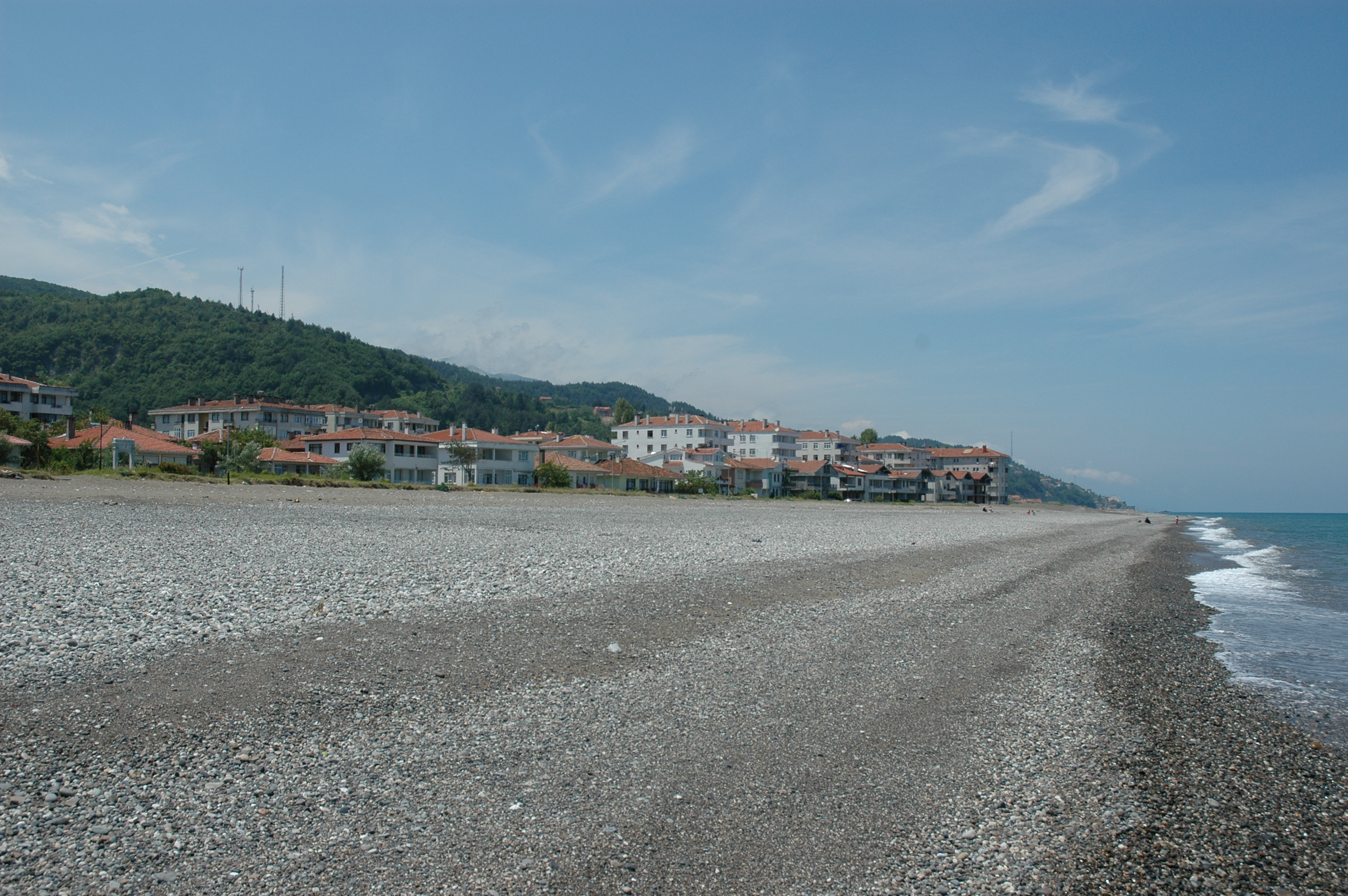
Abana in 2005

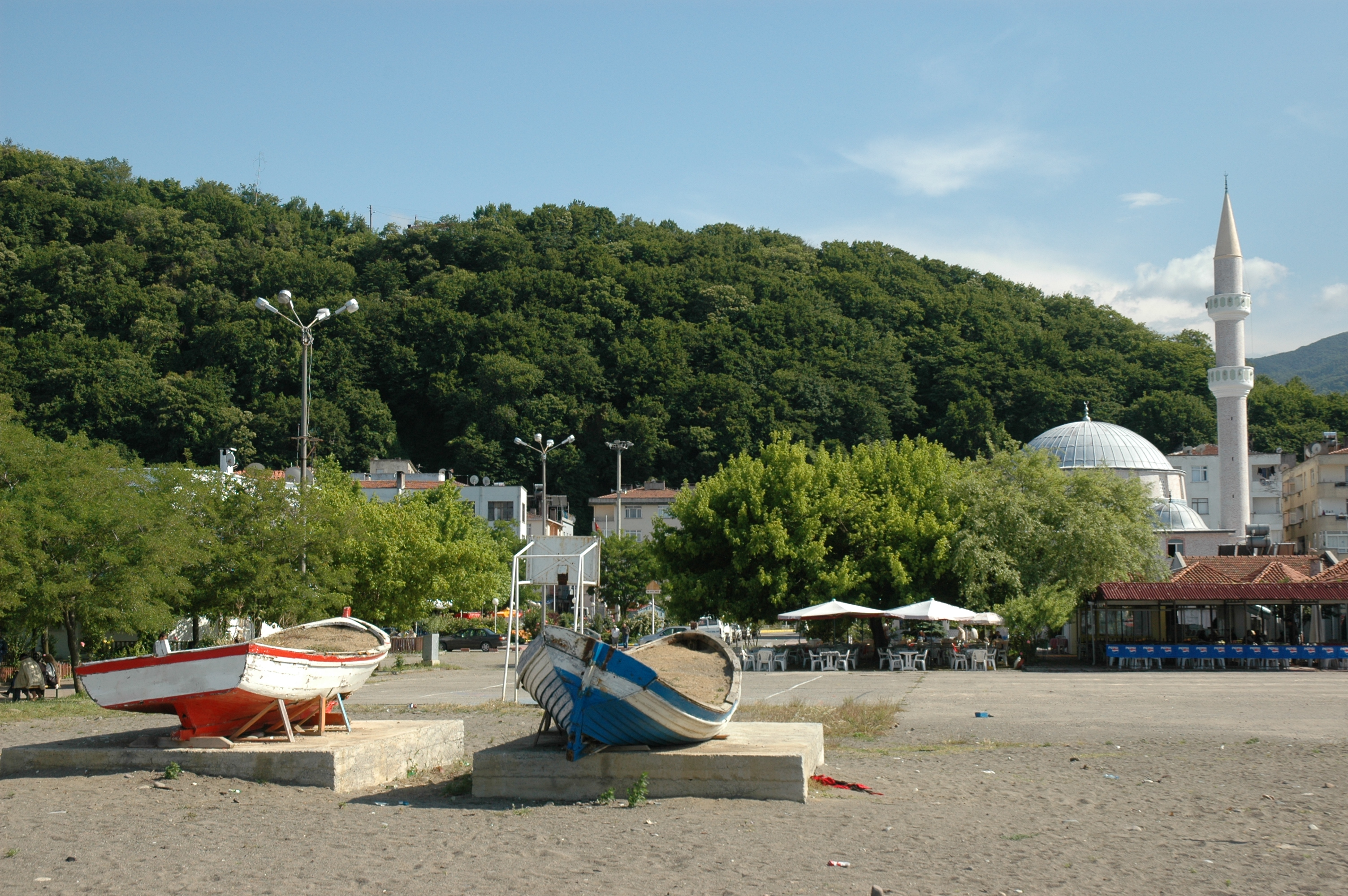
Abana in 2005

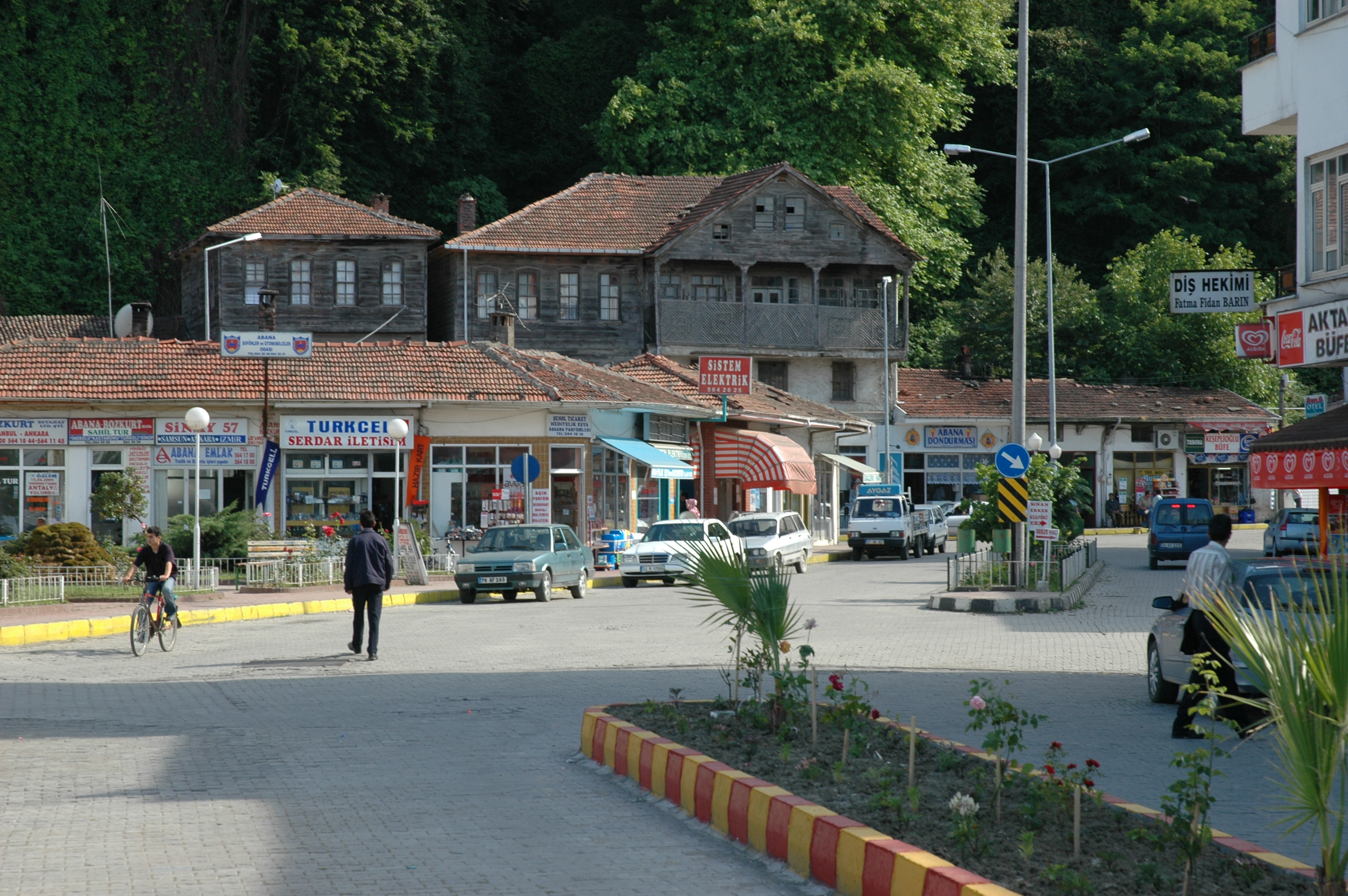
Abana in 2005

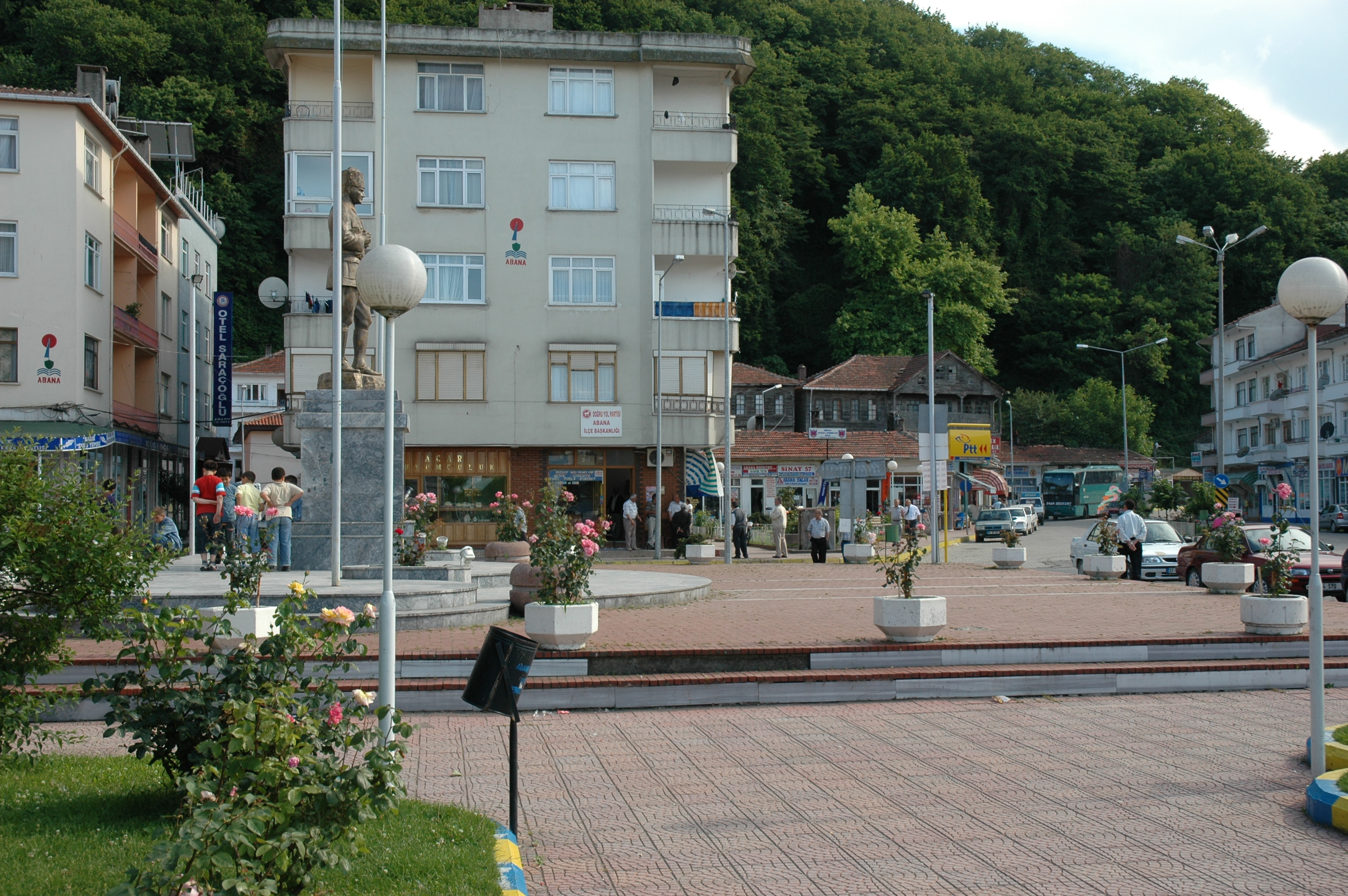
Abana in 2005

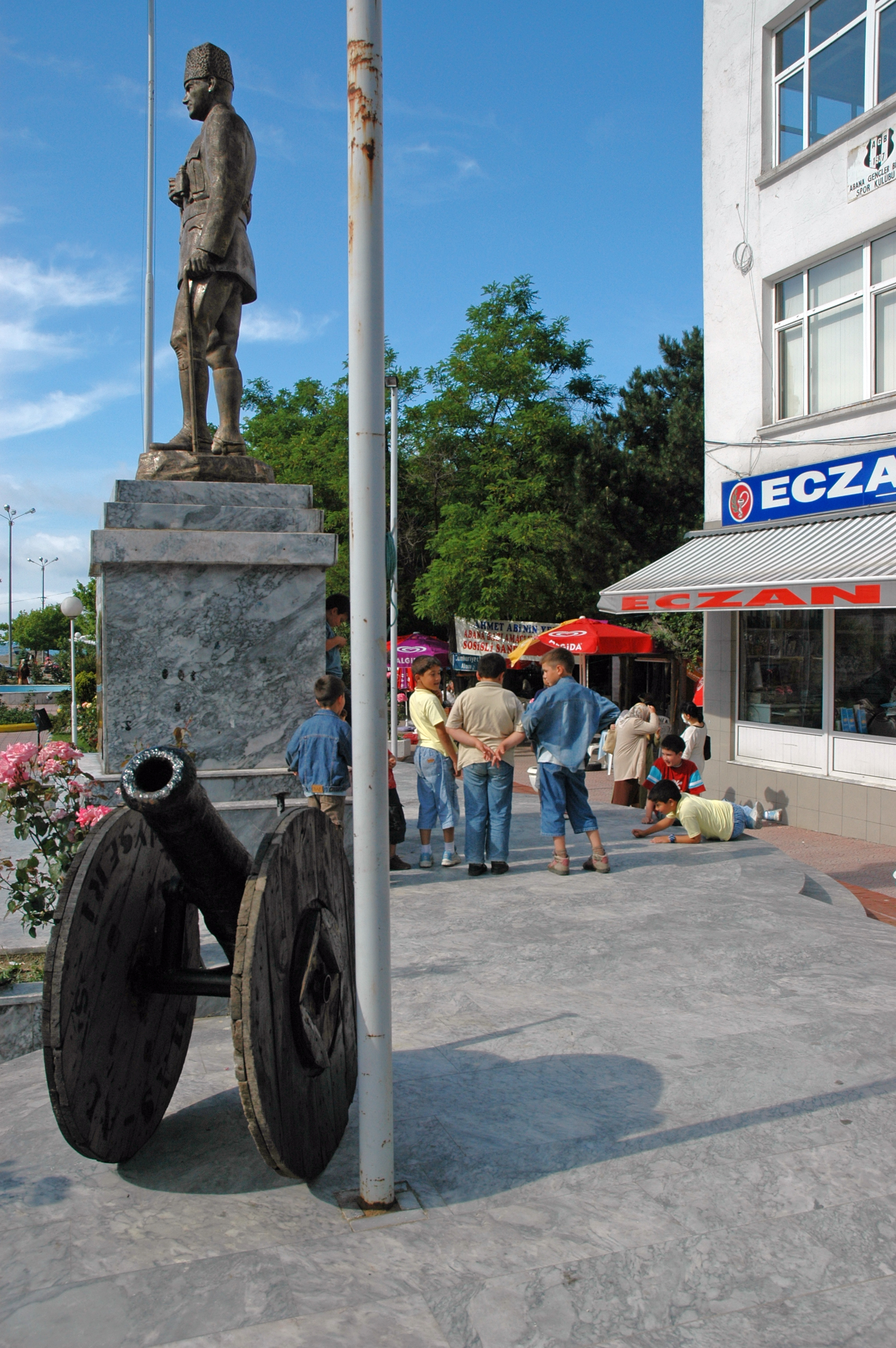
Abana in 2005

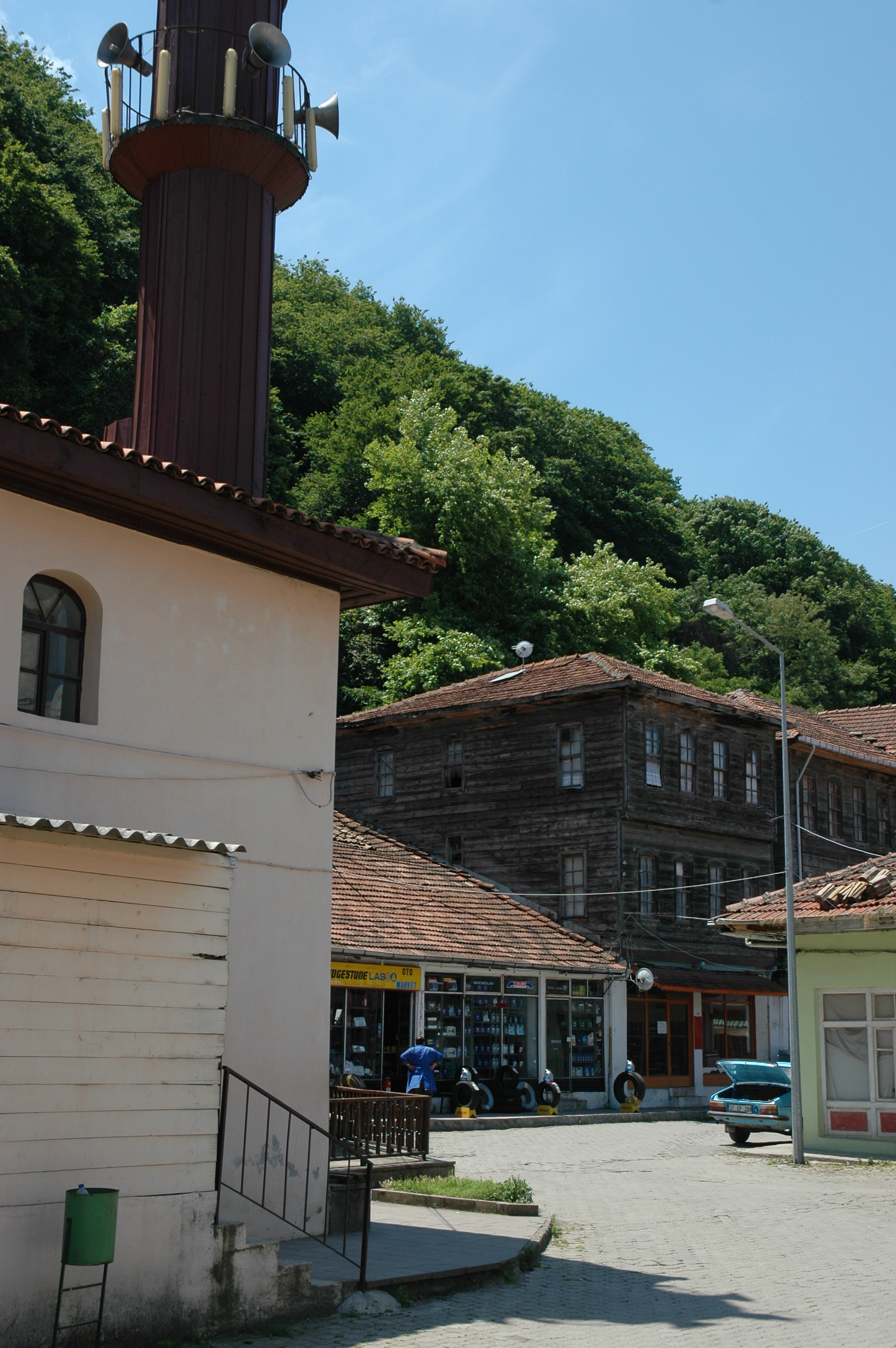
Abana in 2005

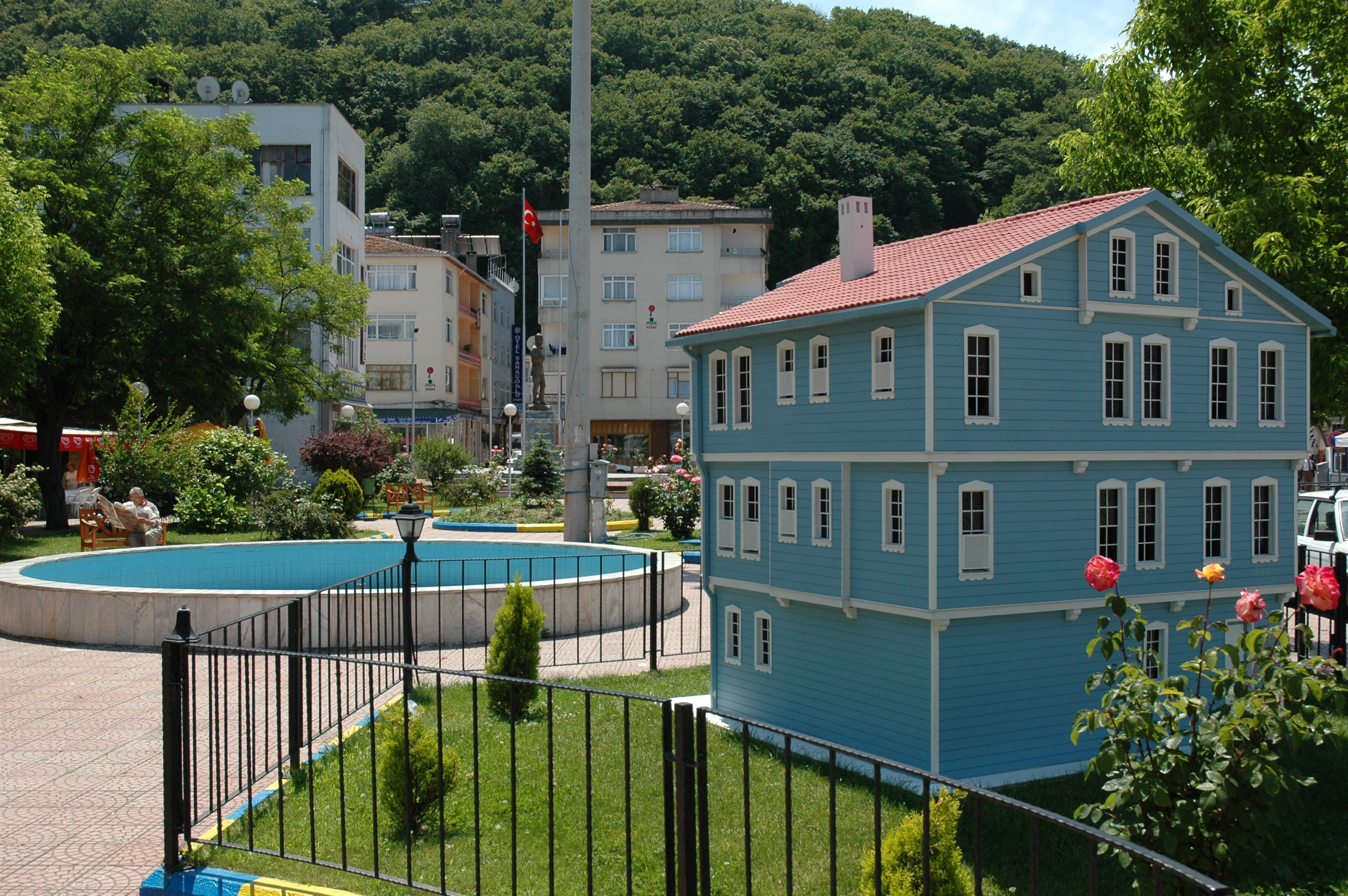
Abana in 2005

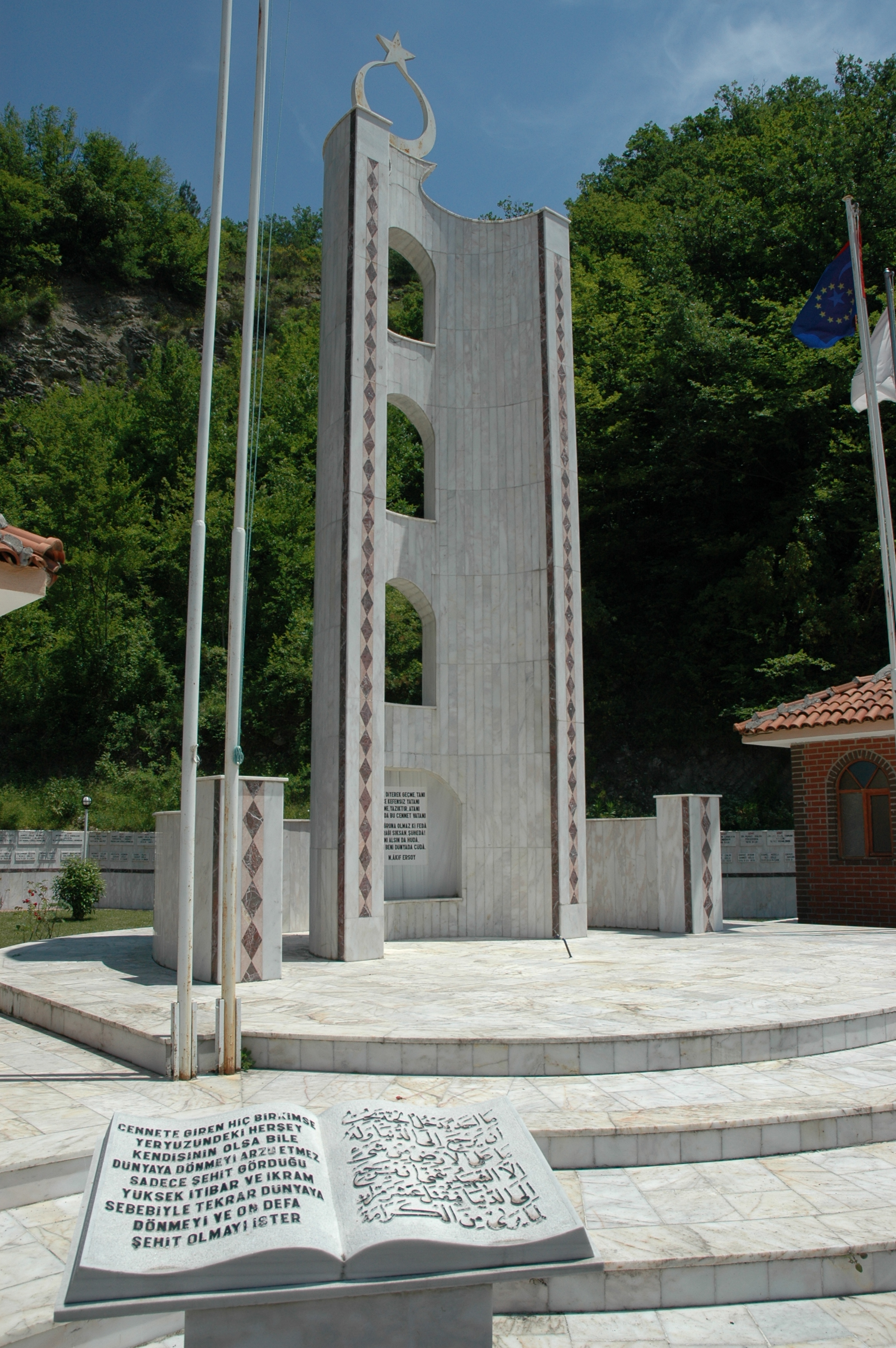
Abana in 2005

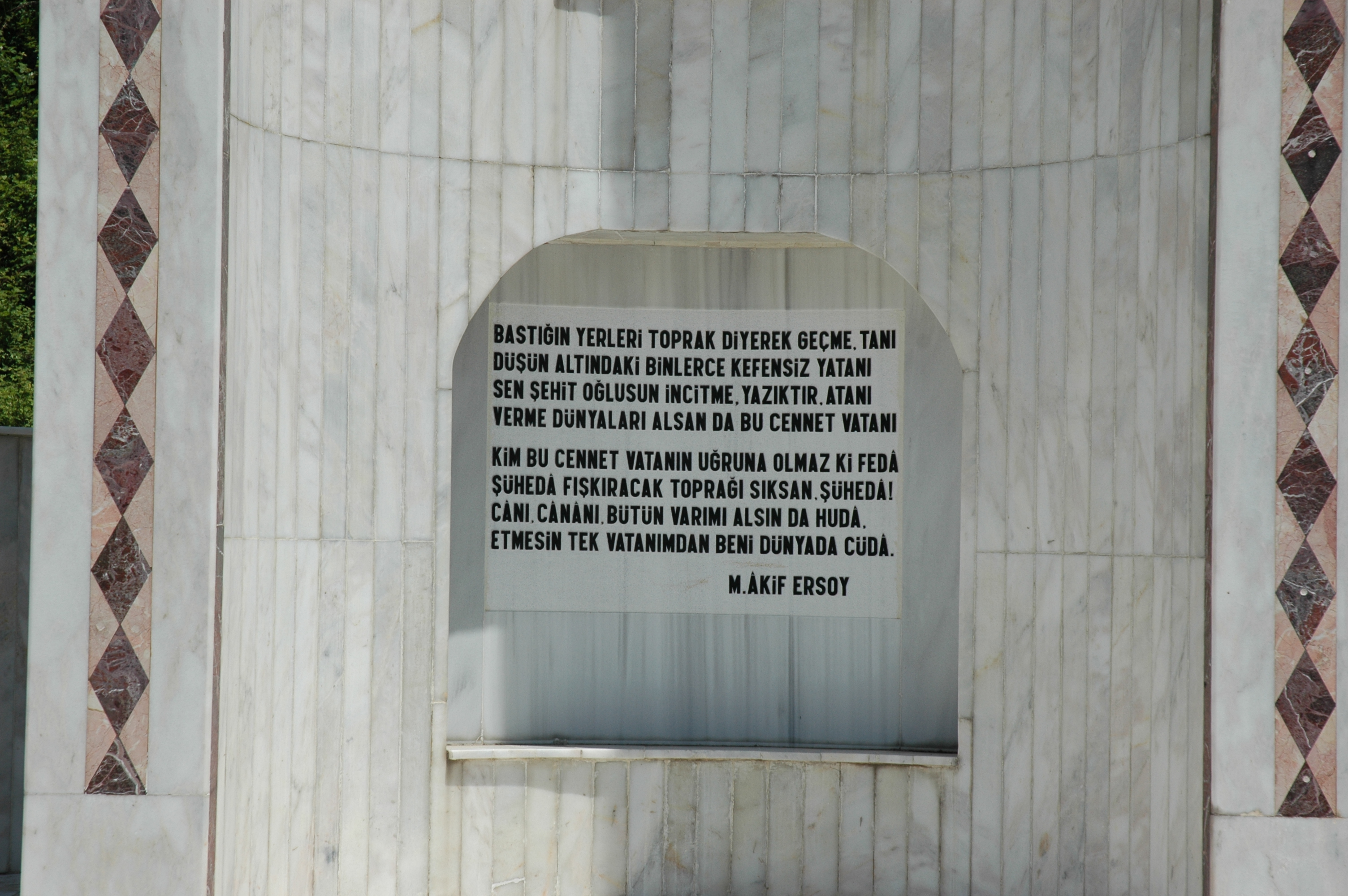
Abana in 2005
