= Judson, North Carolina =

Judson, North Carolina may refer to:

- Judson, Cumberland County, North Carolina
- Judson, Swain County, North Carolina
