= Judson, Minnesota =

Unincorporated community in Minnesota, US

Judson
- Unincorporated community
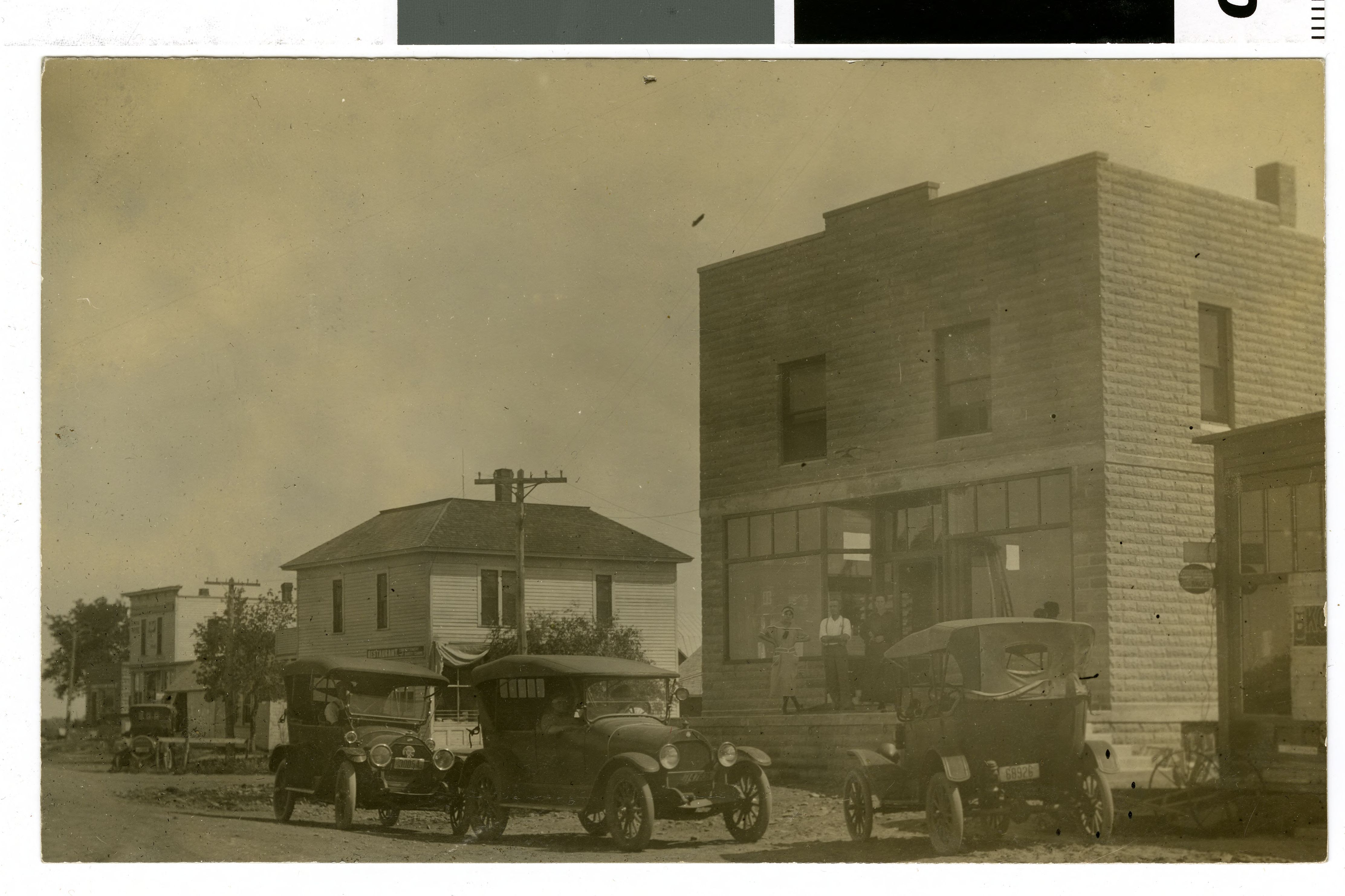
- Judson in 1920

- Location within Minnesota Location within the United States
- Coordinates: 44°11′47″N 94°11′43″W
- Country: United States
- State: Minnesota
- County: Blue Earth
- Elevation: 801 ft (244 m)
- Time zone: UTC-6 (Central (CST))
  - Summer (DST): UTC-5 (CDT)
- Area code: 507
- GNIS feature ID: 654772

Judson is an unincorporated community in Blue Earth County, in the U.S. state of Minnesota.

== History ==
A post office was established at Judson in 1857, and remained in operation until it was discontinued in 1973. Judson was named for a pioneer settler.
