= Altıkulaç, Abana =

Village in Turkey

Altıkulaç
- Village
- Location in Turkey
- Coordinates: 41.961°N 34.086°E
- Country: Turkey
- Province: Kastamonu
- District: Abana
- Population (2021): 89
- Time zone: UTC+3 (TRT)

Altıkulaç is a village in the Abana District of Kastamonu Province in Turkey. Its population is 89 (2021).
