= Lasset Costa =

São Tomé and Príncipe footballer

Jorge Lasset dos Santos Costa (born 27 August 1986 in São Tomé), known as Lasset Costa, is São Toméan footballer who plays for Sporting Praia Cruz in São Tomé and Príncipe Championship as a defender. He was called to São Tomé and Príncipe national football team at the 2013 Africa Cup of Nations.
