= Judson (footballer, born 1992) =

Equatoguinean footballer

Personal information
- Full name: Judson Augusto do Bonfim Santos
- Date of birth: 6 May 1992 (age 34)
- Place of birth: Salvador, Bahia, Brazil
- Height: 1.70 m (5 ft 7 in)
- Position: Attacking midfielder

Team information
- Current team: São Bernardo

Senior career*
Years	Team	Apps	(Gls)
2011–	São Bernardo	18	(3)
2012	→ Mauaense (loan)	14	(2)
2015	→ Cuiabá (loan)		

International career^{‡}
2012–2013	Equatorial Guinea	5	(1)
- * Club domestic league appearances and goals ‡ National team caps and goals as of 16 June 2013

Judson Augusto do Bonfim Santos, known as just Judson, is a professional football player. Born in Brazil, he plays for the Equatorial Guinea national team.

In October 2012, he represented Equatorial Guinea in a 2013 Africa Cup of Nations qualification game versus Democratic Republic of the Congo. He scored on his international debut in a 2–1 victory over the Congolese side.

== International career ==
=== International goals ===
Scores and results list Equatorial Guinea's goal tally first.

No	Date	Venue	Opponent	Score	Result	Competition
1.	14 October 2012	Estadio de Malabo, Malabo, Equatorial Guinea	DR Congo	2–0	2–1	2013 Africa Cup of Nations qualification
