= Artist-Blacksmith's Association of North America =

Organization to promote blacksmithing

- Founded: 1973
- Type: 501c3 Non Profit
- Purpose: Blacksmithing
- Location: Johnstown, Pennsylvania, United States of America
- Region served: North America
- Method: teaching
- Website: abana.org

The Artist-Blacksmith's Association of North America (ABANA) was formed in 1973 to preserve and promote blacksmithing as an art and a craft.

== History ==
The Artist-Blacksmith's Association of North America was formed in 1973 with twenty-seven members. There are now 4000 members.

== Publications ==
ABANA publishes two magazines on a quarterly basis: The Hammer's Blow and The Anvil's Ring.

== Conferences ==
ABANA holds a biennial conference to educate successive generations of blacksmiths and showcase modern and traditional blacksmithing to the general public. ABANA conferences typically have a gallery space to showcase the work of their members, educational spaces to provide hands-on demonstrations to all levels of smiths (novice to advanced), and demos by local and international demonstrators including artist-blacksmiths, farriers, bladesmiths, and toolsmiths. Each conference is held at a new location with the assistance of local ABANA affiliate blacksmith groups.

Starting in 2021, ABANA held the first Iron to Art Festival which, in part, celebrated their new home office and museum space in Johnstown, Pennsylvania.

In June 2024, ABANA will celebrate its 50th Anniversary by holding a conference in Johnstown. Also scheduled is a blacksmith competition to be held in Johnstown's Central Park.

The past locations by year are as follows:

1973: Lumpkin, Georgia

1974: Lumpkin, Georgia

1975: Greenville, South Carolina

1976: Carbondale, Illinois

1978: Purchase, New York

1980: Santa Cruz, California

1982: Ripley, West Virginia

1984: De Pere, Wisconsin

1986: Flagstaff, Arizona

1988: Birmingham, Alabama

1990: Alfred, New York

1992: San Luis Obispo, California

1994: St. Louis, Missouri

1996: Alfred, New York

1998: Asheville, North Carolina

2000: Flagstaff, Arizona

2002: La Crosse, Wisconsin

2004: Richmond, Kentucky

2006: Seattle, Washington

2008: Canceled (was scheduled for New Paltz, New York)

2010: Memphis, Tennessee

2012: Rapid City, South Dakota

2014: Harrington, Delaware

2016: Salt Lake City, Utah

2018: Richmond, Virginia

2020: Canceled (was scheduled for Saratoga, New York)

2021: Iron to Art Festival, Johnstown, Pennsylvania

2022: Canceled (was scheduled for Denton, Texas)

2024: 50th Anniversary Celebration, Johnstown, Pennsylvania
