= National Stadium (Sierra Leone) =

Stadium in Freetown, Sierra Leone

Coordinates: 8°28′46.4″N 13°14′56.6″W

Siaka Stevens National Stadium
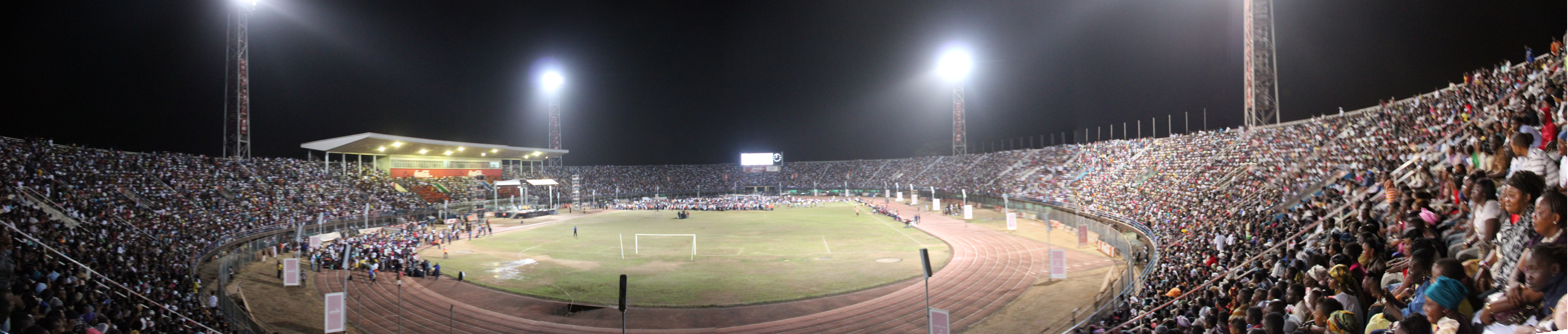
- Interactive map of Siaka Stevens National Stadium
- Location: Freetown, Sierra Leone
- Owner: Government of Sierra Leone
- Operator: Sierra Leone Ministry of Sport
- Capacity: 45,000
- Surface: Grass

Construction
- Built: 1979
- Opened: 1980
- Renovated: 2022–present

Tenant
- Sierra Leone national football team

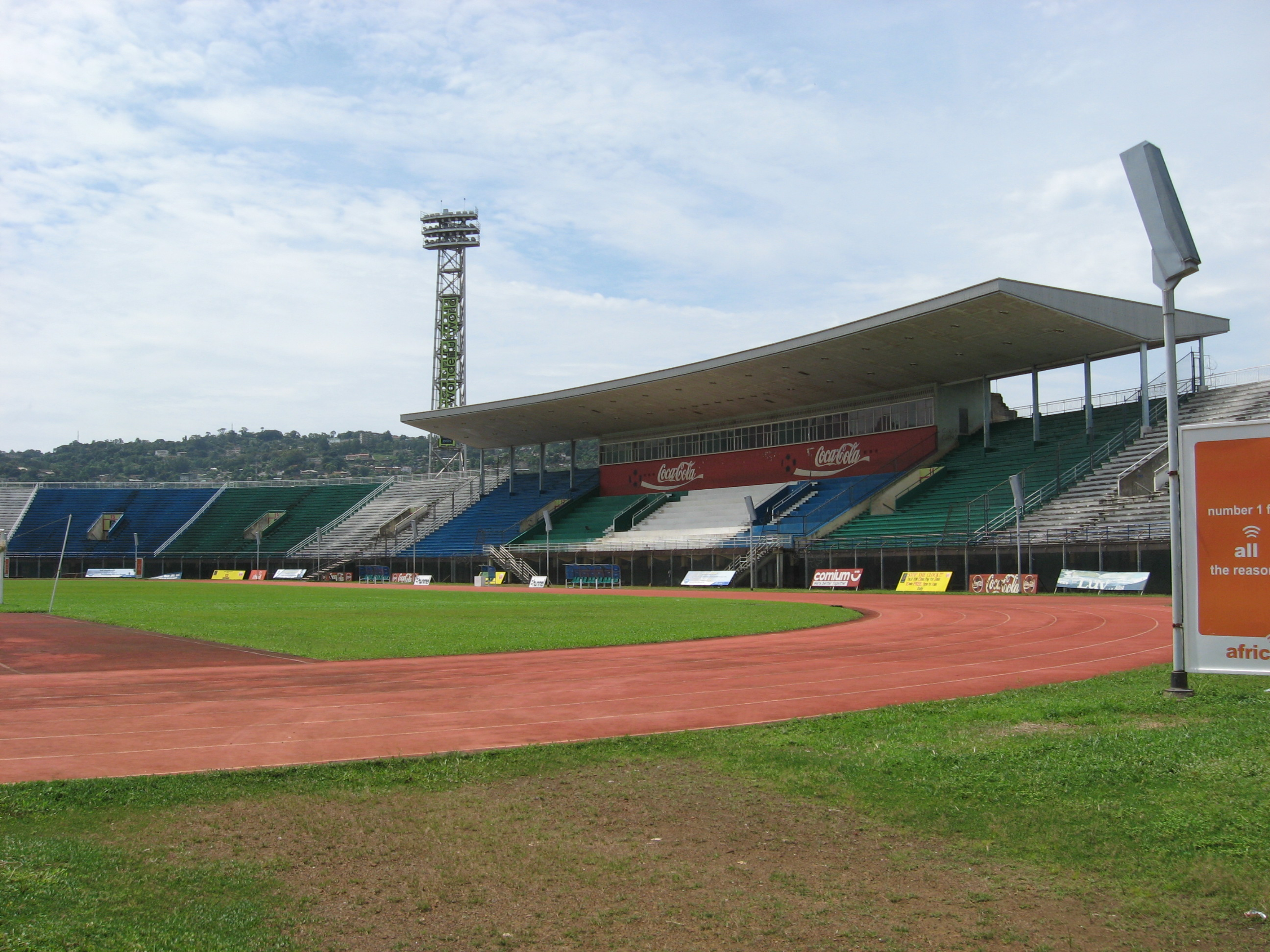
Sierra Leone National Stadium.jpg

The Siaka Stevens National Stadium, commonly known informally as the National Stadium, is the national stadium of Sierra Leone, located in the capital city of Freetown. It is used mostly for football matches and it also has athletics facilities. It is the largest and main stadium in Sierra Leone and has a capacity of 45,000. The stadium serves as the exclusive home of the Sierra Leone national football team, known as the Leone Stars.

Several professional Sierra Leonean football clubs in the Sierra Leone National Premier League play their home games at the stadium. The stadium is also occasionally used as a venue for social, cultural, religious, political, and musical entertainment. the inauguration of a newly elected President of Sierra Leone is usually held at the stadium.

The Siaka Stevens Stadium is owned by the Government of Sierra Leone, and is operated, run and managed by the Sierra Leone Ministry of Sports, which is technically a part of the Sierra Leone Government.

The stadium is named after Sierra Leone's first president Siaka Stevens, who signed and approved the budget for the construction of the stadium in 1979.

== History ==
Completed on 18 April 1979 by the Chinese as the Siaka Stevens Stadium (named after President Siaka Stevens), the stadium's name was changed in 1992 when a coup was launched by a group of young military officers which established themselves as the National Provisional Ruling Council (NPRC). In 2008, fans called for the change of the name back to Siaka Stevens Stadium, citing a lack of sporting success since the change.

The previous stadium that was there was called Reckrie Stadium. It was completely demolished in the late 70s to make way for the present stadium..
