= 2014 CEMAC Cup squads =

Football tournament squads

2014 CEMAC Cup was the ninth edition of the CEMAC Cup - the football championship of Central African nations. The tournament was held in Equatorial Guinea from December 1–14.

== Group A ==
=== Cameroon ===
Coach: François Heya

No.	Pos.	Player	Date of birth (age)	Caps	Club
	GK	Pierre Abogo			(Cameroon) Tonnerre Yaoundé
	GK	Eyilli Ngosso			(Cameroon) Fovu Club
	GK	Georges Bokwe	14 July 1989 (aged 25)		(Cameroon) Coton Sport
	DF	Jean Matike			(Cameroon) Union Douala
	DF	Carlain Manga Mbah	13 January 1993 (aged 21)		(Cameroon) Coton Sport
	DF	Tabi Manga	17 November 1984 (aged 30)		(Cameroon) APEJES Academy
	DF	Denis Dassi			(Cameroon) NQSA
	DF	Fernanado Bongnyang	27 October 1988 (aged 26)		(Cameroon) Coton Sport
	DF	Kombi Mandjang	1 June 1992 (aged 22)		(Cameroon) Union Douala
	DF	Fabrice Ngah	16 October 1997 (aged 17)		(Cameroon) Astres FC
	MF	Guy Zock à Bep	6 May 1994 (aged 20)		(Cameroon) Cosmos de Bafia
	MF	Abanda Nkoa			(Cameroon) Tonnerre Yaoundé
	MF	Nego Tembeng	13 September 1991 (aged 23)		(Cameroon) Astres FC
	MF	Yazid Atouba	2 January 1993 (aged 21)		(Cameroon) Canon Yaoundé
	MF	Arnaud Monkam	22 February 1986 (aged 28)		(Republic of the Congo) AC Léopards
	FW	Grégoire Nkama	25 December 1991 (aged 22)		(Cameroon) Panthère du Ndé
	FW	Marcelin Ngando	27 February 1989 (aged 25)		(Cameroon) New Star de Douala
	FW	Marius Noubissi	28 November 1996 (aged 18)		(Cameroon) Astres FC
	FW	Moussa Souleymanou	12 October 1994 (aged 20)		(Cameroon) Coton Sport
	FW	Joseph Yanki	27 November 1993 (aged 21)		(Cameroon) Coton Sport
	FW	Christian Heumi			(Cameroon) Astres FC

=== Central African Republic ===
Coach: Etienne Momokoamas

No.	Pos.	Player	Date of birth (age)	Caps	Club
	GK	Elvis Samolah	13 June 1994 (aged 20)		(Central African Republic) Espérance
	GK	Evrard Gondje			(Central African Republic) DFC8
	GK	Levant Gbavito			(Central African Republic) Olympic Real
	DF	Acquis Mangou	5 October 1981 (aged 33)		(Central African Republic) DFC8
	DF	Parfait Tamboulas	29 April 1995 (aged 19)		(Central African Republic) Olympic Real
	DF	Thérence Kéthe	23 November 1989 (aged 25)		(Central African Republic) SCAF Tocages
	DF	Kévin Bédot	28 September 1992 (aged 22)		(Central African Republic) SCAF Tocages
	DF	Audin Boutou	23 December 1988 (aged 25)		(Central African Republic) DFC8
	DF	Brice Azou	16 November 1989 (aged 25)		(Central African Republic) DFC8
	MF	Saint-Fort Dimokoyen	7 August 1992 (aged 22)		(Central African Republic) Anges de Fatima
	MF	Steve Bekaïn			(Central African Republic) Comboni
	MF	Jeffersson Gbafio Semboy			(Central African Republic) Tempête Mocaf
	MF	Norman Bokanda	20 July 1987 (aged 27)		(Central African Republic) Tempête Mocaf
	MF	Ulrich Guenzé	4 December 1990 (aged 23)		(Central African Republic) Olympic Real
	MF	Trésor Toropité	31 July 1994 (aged 20)		(Central African Republic) DFC8
	MF	Doualan Gofité			(Central African Republic) Comboni
	MF	Christian Ngaïdangare	25 May 1987 (aged 27)		(Central African Republic) FCFDS
	MF	Wilson Sanféï			(Central African Republic)
	FW	David Bida	28 March 1994 (aged 20)		(Central African Republic) DFC8
	FW	Boris Sandjo	22 May 1987 (aged 27)		(Central African Republic) DFC8
	FW	Cyrus Grengou	25 October 1993 (aged 21)		(Central African Republic) SCAF Tocages
	FW	Gael Guétoua			(Central African Republic) Espérance

=== Equatorial Guinea ===
Coach: Aniceto Okenve

No.	Pos.	Player	Date of birth (age)	Caps	Goals	Club
13	GK	Felipe Ovono	26 July 1993 (aged 21)			(Equatoguinean Football Federation) Deportivo Mongomo
3	DF	Franklin Bama	9 September 1996 (aged 18)			(Equatoguinean Football Federation) Akonangui
4	DF	Diosdado Mbele	8 April 1997 (aged 17)			(Equatoguinean Football Federation) Leones Vegetarianos
5	DF	Adriano Garça	30 March 1986 (aged 28)			(Brazilian Football Confederation) EC Juventude
	DF	Sebastián Bonifacio Nguema				
6	MF	Juvenal Edjogo Owono (captain)	3 April 1979 (aged 35)			(Andorran Football Federation) FC Santa Coloma
10	MF	Dio	26 September 1986 (aged 28)			(Royal Moroccan Football Federation) Maghreb Fez
19	MF	Viera Ellong	14 August 1987 (aged 27)			(Equatoguinean Football Federation) The Panthers
7	FW	César Rivas	28 June 1979 (aged 35)			Unattached
11	FW	Roben Obama	21 June 1993 (aged 21)			(Equatoguinean Football Federation) Leones Vegetarianos
	FW	Wenceslao Afugu	16 September 1992 (aged 22)			(Equatoguinean Football Federation) Leones Vegetarianos

== Group B ==
=== Chad ===
Coach: Emmanuel Trégoat

No.	Pos.	Player	Date of birth (age)	Caps	Club
1	GK	Mbairamadji Dillah	18 September 1985 (aged 29)		(Chad) Foullah Edifice
	GK	Adoum Defallah	31 January 1990 (aged 24)		(Chad) Elect-Sport FC
	GK	Mathieu Adoassou	9 May 1995 (aged 19)		(Chad) Foullah Edifice
14	DF	Constant Madtoingué	23 September 1994 (aged 20)		(Chad) AS CotonTchad
15	DF	Natar Aldongar	16 October 1992 (aged 22)		(Chad) Foullah Edifice
18	DF	Beadoum Mondé	1 January 1988 (aged 26)		(Chad) Gazelle FC
22	DF	Cesar Abaya	12 October 1984 (aged 30)		(Chad) Renaissance FC
	DF	Mondésir Alladjim	10 February 1986 (aged 28)		(Chad) Renaissance FC
	DF	Ninga Ndonane	25 April 1988 (aged 26)		(Chad)
2	MF	Leger Djime (vice-captain)	2 October 1987 (aged 27)		(Morocco) Difaa El Jadida
3	MF	Morgan Betorangal	25 August 1988 (aged 26)		(Luxembourg) Union 05 Kayl-Tétange
7	MF	Hassan Hissein	20 May 1992 (aged 22)		(Nigeria) El-Kanemi Warriors
8	MF	Herman Doumnan	25 September 1984 (aged 30)		(Chad) Gazelle FC
10	MF	Hilaire Kedigui (captain)	19 September 1985 (aged 29)		(Chad) Gazelle FC
17	MF	Ferdinand Gassina	13 November 1992 (aged 22)		(Chad) Foullah Edifice
	MF	Nassar Koulelengar	5 October 1995 (aged 19)		(Chad) Renaissance FC
9	FW	Rodrigue Ninga	17 May 1993 (aged 21)		(Chad) Renaissance FC
11	FW	Wola Djong Yang	8 November 1995 (aged 19)		(Chad) Elect-Sport FC
12	FW	Mahamat Labbo	21 July 1988 (aged 26)		(France) ES Bonchamp
	FW	Hassane Brahim	13 November 1989 (aged 25)	1	(Chad) Elect-Sport FC
	FW	Esaie Djikoloum	3 October 1991 (aged 23)		(Chad) AS CotonTchad
	FW	Maitara Maxime	5 February 1996 (aged 18)		(Chad) Renaissance FC

=== Congo ===
Coach: Paolo Berrettini

No.	Pos.	Player	Date of birth (age)	Caps	Club
1	GK	Pavelh Ndzila	12 January 1995 (aged 19)		(Republic of the Congo) Étoile du Congo
2	GK	Joé Ombandza	9 April 1998 (aged 16)		(Republic of the Congo) ACNFF
3	DF	Faria Jobel Ondongo	19 June 1996 (aged 18)		(Republic of the Congo) Étoile du Congo
4	DF	Karl Ekaya	9 April 1995 (aged 19)		(Republic of the Congo) CSMD Diables Noirs
5	DF	Cosme Mavoungou	22 December 1996 (aged 17)		(Republic of the Congo) TP Caïman
6	DF	Grâce Mamic Itoua	12 April 1994 (aged 20)		(Republic of the Congo) AS Kondzo
7	DF	Dorvel Dibékou	17 December 1998 (aged 15)		(Republic of the Congo) Saint-Michel de Loukoléla
8	MF	Hardy Binguila	17 July 1996 (aged 18)		(France) AJ Auxerre
9	MF	Amour Loussoukou	5 December 1996 (aged 17)		(Republic of the Congo) ACNFF
10	MF	Moïse Nkounkou	2 August 1996 (aged 18)		(Republic of the Congo) AC Léopards
11	MF	Charlevy Mabiala	31 March 1996 (aged 18)		(France) AJ Auxerre
12	FW	Kader Georges Bidimbou	20 February 1996 (aged 18)		(Republic of the Congo) AC Léopards
13	MF	Christ Bakaki	21 September 1995 (aged 19)		(Republic of the Congo) CSMD Diables Noirs
14	DF	Baron Kibamba	23 March 1998 (aged 16)		(Republic of the Congo) CARA Brazzaville
15	FW	Deldy Ngoyi	9 April 1997 (aged 17)		(Republic of the Congo) ACNFF
16	MF	Saïra Issambet	14 January 1998 (aged 16)		(Mozambique) Ferroviario de Maputo
17	FW	Arci Biassadila Mouanga	2 February 1995 (aged 19)		(Republic of the Congo) CSMD Diables Noirs
18		Jean Rosis Opimbat			(Republic of the Congo)
19	MF	Juslain Babelé	29 December 1996 (aged 17)		(Republic of the Congo) Tongo FC
20	MF	Fred Ngoma	24 November 1997 (aged 17)		(Republic of the Congo) CSMD Diables Noirs
21		Grâce Ntota			(Republic of the Congo)
22		Yannick Elenga			(Republic of the Congo)

=== Gabon ===
Coach: Stéphane Bouguedza

No.	Pos.	Player	Date of birth (age)	Caps	Club
	GK	Yves Bitséki Moto	23 April 1983 (aged 31)		(Gabon) US Bitam
	GK	Laurhian Kantsouga	3 April 1988 (aged 26)		(Gabon) Mangasport
	GK	Boris Nguéma	7 December 1984 (aged 29)		(Gabon) AC Bongoville
	DF	Edmond Mouélé	18 February 1982 (aged 32)		(Gabon) Mangasport
	DF	Lionel Yakouya	12 July 1990 (aged 24)		(Gabon) US Bitam
	DF	Emmanuel Ndong Mba	4 May 1992 (aged 22)		(Gabon) US Bitam
	DF	Muller Dinda	22 September 1995 (aged 19)		(Gabon) Missile FC
	DF	Yann José Gnassa	13 January 1993 (aged 21)		(Gabon) Sapins FC
	DF	Martin Ndong	28 June 1988 (aged 26)		(Gabon) Mangasport
	MF	Erwin Nguéma	7 March 1989 (aged 25)		(Gabon) US Bitam
	MF	Serge Mbavu			(Gabon)
	MF	Duval Nzembi	13 October 1988 (aged 26)		(Gabon) Missile FC
	MF	Georges Ambourouet	1 May 1986 (aged 28)		(Gabon) CF Mounana
	MF	Knox Yonga	27 April 1994 (aged 20)		(Gabon) CF Mounana
	MF	Bonaventure Sokambi	29 January 1991 (aged 23)		(Algeria) ASO Chlef
	MF	Cédric Ondo	17 August 1994 (aged 20)		(Gabon) Cercle Mbéri Sportif
	FW	Serge Mbanu			(Gabon)
	FW	Auriol Pongui	1 March 1993 (aged 21)		(Gabon) Missile FC
	FW	Tchen Kabi	27 April 1986 (aged 28)		(Gabon) Missile FC
	FW	Christ Obama	17 April 1993 (aged 21)		(Gabon) AC Bongoville
	FW	John Sombhy			(Gabon)
	FW	Cédric Nko’o	10 October 1983 (aged 31)		(Gabon) US O'Mbila Nziami
	FW	Davy Mayoungou	27 October 1993 (aged 21)		(Gabon) CF Mounana
