= List of Gazelle FC players =

This is a list of Gazelle FC players. Gazelle FC is a football club from Chad based in N'Djamena and plays at Stade Omnisports Idriss Mahamat Ouya. The club was formed on 16 May 1972.

== List of players ==
List of Gazelle FC players
Name	Nationality	Position	Gazelle FC career	Ref				
Name	Nationality	Position	Gazelle FC career	Ref	Mbairamadji Dillah	Chad	GK	to 2014, 2019-
Hilaire Kédigui	Chad	MF	2011-2014					
Madawa Macrada (Note: Also as Madawa Makrada)	Chad	DF	to 2014					
Privat Mbororo	Chad	DF	to 2014					
Halidou Douva Abdou	Cameroon	FW	to 2014					
Felix Mbaihore	Chad	DF	2014–present					
Militoh Bemadji	Chad	DF	to 2014					
Moumine Ekiang	Chad	GK	to 2014					
Doumnan Herman	Chad	MF	to 2016					
Alyo Kilmbaye	Chad	DF	to 2014					
Serge Diguel	Chad	GK	to 2014					
Nodjiram Ngambert	Chad	MF	to 2014					
Esaie Allahfi	Chad	DF	to 2014					
Mahamat Ali	Chad	FW	to 2014					
Oumarou Souaibou	Chad	FW	to 2014					
Ali Issa	Chad	FW	to 2014					
Dogo Mahamat	Chad	FW	to 2014					
Ali Kabir	Chad	MF	to 2014					
Beadoum Mondé	Chad	FW	2014-2017, 2018					
Hervé	Chad		to 2014					
Boumsong	Chad		to 2014					
Cyril	Chad		to 2014					
Malik	Chad		to 2014					
Oumar Yangoussou	Chad	GK	2015–present					
Celestin Edouard Djembayel	Chad	FW	2015–present					
Fabrice Djimhoue	Chad	DF	2015–present					
Ahmed Evariste	Chad	FW	2014–2018					
Claude Ngueysara	Chad	FW	2014–2015					
Kayber Deindje	Chad	MF	2015–present					
Abdoulaye Mahamat	Chad	MF	2015–present					
Mahamat Djibrine	Chad	DF	2015–present					
Maigue Abbas	Chad	DF	2009-2010, 2013–2018					
Joel Madour	Chad	DF	2015–present					
Philemon Ghislain Mendouga	Cameroon	GK	2015–present					
Aaron Daidansou	Chad	MF	2015–present					
Ninga Ndonane	Chad	DF	2015–2018					
César Abaya	Chad	DF	2014					
Baina Issaka	Chad	DF	2015–present					
Abbo	Chad	DF	2014–2015					
Abdel Aziz Makine	Chad	DF	2015–present					
Abou Deco, Mahamat Adda	Chad	MF	2015–2017					
Frederick Abboh	Chad	MF	2015–present					
Djamal Mahamat Saleh	Chad	FW	2016–present					
Marius Mouandilmadji	Chad	FW	2016–2017					
Ahmat Hassan	Chad	FW	2016–present					
Amadou Djimet	Chad	MF	2016–present					
Emmanuel Banadji	Chad	MF	2016–present					
Evariste Fignal N'Dibi	Chad	DF	2016–present					
Loubandem Guiguiban Aimé	Chad	MF	2016–present					
Ninga Ndonane	Chad	DF	2016–present					
Hubert Toroum	Chad	MF	2016–present					
Hassan Mahamat Chadara	Chad		2016–present					
Amine Hiver	Chad	FW	2016–2018					
Amadou Mahamat	Cameroon		2016–present					
Livadj Dj. Duralex	Chad	FW	2016–2018					
Emmanuel N'Dadje	Chad	DF	2016–present					
Deounda Masra Yannick	Chad		to 2018					
Hassane Boudina	Chad	FW	2019-					
