= Mahamat (surname) =

Mahamat is a Chadian surname. Notable people with the surname include:

- Azrack Mahamat (born 1988), French-born Chadian footballer
- Bachir Mahamat (born 1996), Chadian sprinter
- Brahim Mahamat (born 1995), Chadian footballer
- Dadji Rahamata Ahmat Mahamat, Chadian feminist activist
- Djamal Mahamat (born 1983), Libyan footballer
- Ngouloure Mahamat (born 1990), Cameroonian footballer
- Nouh Doungous Mahamat (born 1982), former Chadian football player
