= Abakar =

Family name

Abakar is a surname. Notable people with the surname include:

- Abanga Abakar (born 1994), Chadian football player
- Khamis Abakar (1964-2023), Sudanese politician, activist and former army commander
- Mahamat Issa Abakar (born 1984), Chadian football player
- M'Bairo Abakar (born 1961), Chadian judoka
- Oumar Abakar (born 1979), Chadian football player
