= 2023 Africa Cup of Nations qualification preliminary round =

Tournament details
- Dates: 23–29 March 2022
- Teams: 12 (from 1 confederation)

Tournament statistics
- Matches played: 10
- Goals scored: 29 (2.9 per match)
- Top scorer(s): Six players (2 goals each)

The preliminary round of the 2023 Africa Cup of Nations qualification tournament decided the six teams which advanced to the group stage of the qualification tournament. The preliminary round consisted of the twelve lowest-ranked teams among the 54 entrants, and was held from 23 to 29 March 2022.

The twelve teams were split into six ties which were played in home-and-away two-legged format. The six winners (Botswana (awarded), Eswatini, Gambia, Lesotho, São Tomé and Príncipe and South Sudan) advanced to the group stage to join the 42 teams which entered directly.

== Draw ==
The draw for the preliminary round was held on 21 January 2022 at 16:00 WAT (UTC+1) in Douala, Cameroon. The twelve involved national teams were previously seeded into two pots of six based on the FIFA World Rankings from 23 December 2021 (shown in parentheses).

The teams in bold qualified for the qualifying group stage.

Pot 1	Pot 2
**Lesotho** (145); **Eswatini** (146); **Botswana** (148); **Gambia** (150); **South Sudan** (167); Mauritius (172)	Chad (180); **São Tomé and Príncipe** (189); Djibouti (192); Somalia (194); Seychelles (197); Eritrea (202)

Former Cameroon captain Rigobert Song and Nigerian former player Emmanuel Amunike were the draw assistants during the ceremony. The draw resulted in six ties.

== Matches ==
On 2 March 2022, Eritrea withdrew from the preliminary round.

The first legs were played on 23 and 24 March, and the second legs were played on 27 and 29 March.

In May, Mauritius were awarded a 3–0 win in their first leg against São Tomé and Príncipe, allowing them to reach the group stage with a 6–3 aggregate score, after the goalscorer for the latter Luís Leal was found to have breached the COVID-19 regulations. However, in June, São Tomé and Príncipe had their appeal honoured and the result of the first leg was allowed to stand, enabling them to qualify for the next stage 4–3 on aggregate.

Team 1	Agg.	Team 2	1st leg	2nd leg
Eritrea	awd.	**Botswana**	Canc.	Canc.
**São Tomé and Príncipe**	4–3	Mauritius	1–0	3–3
Djibouti	2–5	**South Sudan**	2–4	0–1
Seychelles	1–3	**Lesotho**	0–0	1–3
Somalia	1–5	**Eswatini**	0–3	1–2
Chad	2–3	**Gambia**	0–1	2–2

24 March 2022
12:00 UTC+0

São Tomé and Príncipe	1–0	Mauritius
Leal 36'	Report

Complexe Sportif de Côte d'Or, Saint Pierre (Mauritius)
27 March 2022
16:00 UTC+4

Mauritius	3–3	São Tomé and Príncipe
Bru 21' (pen.); Collard 57'; Nazira 90+1'	Report	Cardoso 27', 60'; Leal 34'

Complexe Sportif de Côte d'Or, Saint Pierre

São Tomé and Príncipe won 4–3 on aggregate.

23 March 2022
16:00 UTC+3

Djibouti	2–4	South Sudan
Akinbinu 64'; Warsama 90+3'	Report	Okello 54' (pen.), 75'; Toha 68'; Gama 89'

Borg El Arab Stadium, Borg El Arab (Egypt)
27 March 2022
15:00 UTC+2

South Sudan	1–0	Djibouti
Chol 55'	Report

St. Mary's Stadium-Kitende, Entebbe (Uganda)

South Sudan won 5–2 on aggregate.

23 March 2022
16:00 UTC+4

Seychelles	0–0	Lesotho
	Report

Complexe Sportif de Côte d'Or, Saint Pierre (Mauritius)
27 March 2022
16:00 UTC+2

Lesotho	3–1	Seychelles
Makateng 5', 78'; Motebang 9'	Report	Ernesta 25' (pen.)

Dobsonville Stadium, Johannesburg (South Africa)

Lesotho won 3–1 on aggregate.

23 March 2022
--:--

Somalia	0–3	Eswatini
	Report	Dlamini 23'; Mamba 64'; Gamedze 87'

National Stadium, Dar es Salaam (Tanzania)
27 March 2022
15:00 UTC+2

Eswatini	2–1	Somalia
Ndzinisa 46'; Mamba 56'	Report	Hassan 90'

Mbombela Stadium, Mbombela (South Africa)

Eswatini won 5–1 on aggregate.

23 March 2022
17:00 UTC+1

Chad	0–1	Gambia
	Report	Trawally 89' (pen.)

Ahmadou Ahidjo Stadium, Yaoundé (Cameroon)
29 March 2022
18:00 UTC+1

Gambia	2–2	Chad
Ceesay 30', 90+2' (pen.)	Report	Abderamane 28'; Mouandilmadji 48' (pen.)

Stade Adrar, Agadir (Morocco)

Gambia won 3–2 on aggregate.

== Goalscorers ==
There were 29 goals scored in 10 matches, for an average of 2.9 goals per match.

2 goals

- (Eswatini) Fanelo Mamba
- (The Gambia) Assan Ceesay
- (Lesotho) Katleho Makateng
- (São Tomé and Príncipe) Ricardo Cardoso
- (São Tomé and Príncipe) Luís Leal
- (South Sudan) Tito Okello

1 goal

- (Chad) Ahmat Abderamane
- (Chad) Ezechiel N'Douassel
- (Djibouti) Samuel Akinbinu
- (Djibouti) Ibrahim Aden Warsama
- (Eswatini) Bonginkosi Dlamini
- (Eswatini) Sandile Gamedze
- (Eswatini) Sabelo Ndzinisa
- (The Gambia) Bubacarr Trawally
- (Lesotho) Sera Motebang
- (Mauritius) Kévin Bru
- (Mauritius) Dylan Collard
- (Mauritius) Ashley Nazira
- (Seychelles) Jean-Yves Perry Ernesta
- (Somalia) Sak Hassan
- (South Sudan) Peter Chol
- (South Sudan) William Gama
- (South Sudan) Rashid Toha
