= 2021 Africa Cup of Nations qualification Group A =

Football tournament qualifying stage

Group A of the 2021 Africa Cup of Nations qualification tournament was one of the twelve groups that decided the teams which qualified for the 2021 Africa Cup of Nations finals tournament. The group consisted of four teams: Mali, Guinea, Namibia, and Chad (winners of the preliminary round).

The teams played against each other in home-and-away round-robin format, originally scheduled between November 2019 and September 2020.

Due to the COVID-19 pandemic, all matches of matchdays 3 and 4 scheduled for March 2020 were postponed until further notice. FIFA recommended that all June 2020 international matches (matchday 5) be postponed, and also postponed the September 2020 window (matchday 6) for CAF.

On 30 June 2020, the CAF announced the 2021 Africa Cup of Nations final tournament had been postponed from January 2021 to January 2022, without announcing the new dates of the remaining qualifiers. On 19 August 2020, the CAF announced the new dates of the remaining qualifiers, with matchdays 3 and 4 rescheduled to be played between 9–17 November 2020, and matchdays 5 and 6 rescheduled to be played between 22 and 30 March 2021.

Mali and Guinea, the group winners and runners-up respectively, qualified for the 2021 Africa Cup of Nations.

== Standings ==
Pos	Team	Pld	W	D	L	GF	GA	GD	Pts	Qualification	Mali	Guinea	Namibia	Chad
1	Mali	6	4	1	1	10	4	+6	13	Final tournament	—	2–2	1–0	3–0 (Note: On 22 March 2021, CAF disqualified Chad due to government interference. As a result, the two final matches involving Chad were cancelled and awarded as 3–0 wins for their opponents.)
2	Guinea	6	3	2	1	8	5	+3	11	Final tournament	1–0	—	2–0	1–0
3	Namibia	6	3	0	3	8	7	+1	9		1–2	2–1	—	2–1
4	Chad	6	0	1	5	2	12	−10	1		0–2	1–1	0–3	—

Source: CAF
Rules for classification: Tiebreakers

== Matches ==
13 November 2019
18:00 UTC+2

Namibia	2–1	Chad
Adoassou 66' (o.g.); Katjiukua 77'	Report	N'Douassel 68'

Sam Nujoma Stadium, Windhoek
Referee: Mohamed Diraneh Guedi (Djibouti)
14 November 2019
19:00 UTC+0

Mali	2–2	Guinea
A. Traoré I 56'; Sylla 71' (o.g.)	Report	N. Keïta 66'; Condé 75'

Stade du 26 Mars, Bamako
Referee: Noureddine El Jaafari (Morocco)

17 November 2019
14:00 UTC+1

Chad	0–2	Mali
	Report	Djenepo 14'; Camara 45+4'

Stade Omnisports Idriss Mahamat Ouya, N'Djamena
Referee: Dahane Beida (Mauritania)
17 November 2019
16:00 UTC+0

Guinea	2–0	Namibia
Sylla 42'; Kanté 70'	Report

Stade du 28 Septembre, Conakry
Referee: Kouassi Attisso Attiogbe (Togo)

11 November 2020
16:00 UTC+0

Guinea	1–0	Chad
Camara 45'	Report

Stade du 28 Septembre, Conakry
Referee: Mohamed Maarouf Eid (Egypt)
13 November 2020
19:00 UTC+0

Mali	1–0	Namibia
Touré 33' (pen.)	Report

Stade du 26 Mars, Bamako
Referee: Mohamed Ali Moussa (Niger)

15 November 2020
17:00 UTC+1

Chad	1–1	Guinea
Abderamane 45'	Report	N. Keïta 24'

Stade Omnisports Idriss Mahamat Ouya, N'Djamena
Referee: Boureima Sanogo (Burkina Faso)
17 November 2020
21:00 UTC+2

Namibia	1–2	Mali
Kambindu 39'	Report	Koïta 12'; Doumbia 37'

Sam Nujoma Stadium, Windhoek
Referee: Ali Mohamed Adelaid (Comoros)

24 March 2021

Chad	0–3 Awarded (Note: On 22 March 2021, CAF decided that the match scheduled for 24 March 2021 would be awarded as a 3–0 win for Namibia due to the disqualification of Chad.)	Namibia

24 March 2021
16:00 UTC+0

Guinea	1–0	Mali
Soumah 76'	Report

General Lansana Conté Stadium, Conakry
Referee: Youssef Essrayri (Tunisia)

28 March 2021
15:00 UTC+2

Namibia	2–1	Guinea
Shalulile 45+2', 77'	Report	Kane 17'

Sam Nujoma Stadium, Windhoek
Referee: Norman Matemera (Zimbabwe)
28 March 2021

Mali	3–0 Awarded (Note: On 22 March 2021, CAF decided that the match scheduled for 28 March 2021 would be awarded as a 3–0 win for Mali due to the disqualification of Chad.)	Chad

== Goalscorers ==
There were 28 goals scored in 12 matches, for an average of 2.33 goals per match.

4 goals

- (Namibia) Peter Shalulile

2 goals

- (Guinea) Mamadou Kane
- (Guinea) Naby Keïta

1 goal

- (Chad) Ahmat Abdaraman
- (Chad) Ezechiel N'Douassel
- (Guinea) Mady Camara
- (Guinea) Sékou Condé
- (Guinea) José Kanté
- (Guinea) Seydouba Soumah
- (Guinea) Issiaga Sylla
- (Mali) Mohamed Camara
- (Mali) Moussa Djenepo
- (Mali) Moussa Doumbia
- (Mali) Sékou Koïta
- (Mali) Adama Traoré
- (Mali) El Bilal Touré
- (Namibia) Elmo Kambindu
- (Namibia) Chris Katjiukua

1 own goal

- (Chad) Mathieu Adoassou (against Namibia)
- (Guinea) Issiaga Sylla (against Mali)
