= Djimalde Dossengar =

Chadian footballer (born 1984)

Personal information
- Full name: Djimalde Dossengar
- Date of birth: 31 December 1984 (age 41)

International career^{‡}
Years	Team	Apps	(Gls)
2005–2008	Chad	9	(0)
- ‡ National team caps and goals as of 2 July 2014

Djimalde Dossengar (born 31 December 1984) is a Chadian former footballer who played as a midfielder. He was a member of the Chad national team. He has nine caps for national team, and he was a part of qualifying campaign for 2010 World Cup. Now he plays for Elect-Sport FC.

== See also ==
- List of Chad international footballers
