= Chris Katjiukua =

Namibian footballer (born 1986)

Personal information
- Full name: Chris Uarianga Katjiukua
- Date of birth: 25 October 1986 (age 40)
- Place of birth: Okakarara, South West Africa
- Height: 1.85 m (6 ft 1 in)
- Position: Defender

Senior career*
Years	Team	Apps	(Gls)
2006–2011	Eleven Arrows		
2011–2014	African Stars		
2014–2017	Golden Arrows	46	(2)
2017–2018	Highlands Park	28	(3)
2018–2020	Black Leopards	27	(2)
2020	Cape Town Spurs	0	(0)

International career^{‡}
2007–2019	Namibia	36	(2)
- * Club domestic league appearances and goals as of 12 November 2022 ‡ National team caps and goals as of 12 November 2022

Chris Katjiukua (born 25 October 1986) is a Namibian professional footballer who played as a defender for several South African clubs and the Namibia national football team. He has played for Eleven Arrows and African Stars in Namibia, and Lamontville Golden Arrows, Highlands Park and Black Leopards in South Africa—before finishing with a gameless stint at Cape Town Spurs.

== Club career ==
=== Early career ===
Born in Okakarara, Katjiukua started his career with Eleven Arrows where he won the Namibia FA Cup in 2011, before joining African Stars in 2011. He won the Namibia FA Cup again in 2013 with African Stars.

=== Lamontville Golden Arrows ===
Katjiakua joined Lamontville Golden Arrows in January 2014, and made his debut for the club on 8 February 2014, starting in a 3–2 win at home to Polokwane City. He made 2 further South African Premier Division appearances in the 2014–15 season as Golden Arrows were relegated to the National First Division.

He scored his first goal for Golden Arrows on 23 August 2014 in a 1–0 win over Black Leopards, their first game of the season. Over the course of the 2014–15 season, Katjiukua made 26 appearances, scoring twice, as Golden Arrows were promoted back to the South African Premier Division.

He made 16 appearances during the 2015–16 season and one during the 2016–17 season, though did not score during either season. In January 2017, he was released by Lamontville Golden Arrows following three years at the club.

=== Highlands Park ===
Following his release by Golden Arrows, he joined Premier Division club Highlands Park in February 2017, signing a two-and-a-half-year contract with the club. He made his debut for the club on 7 February 2017, before going on to make 10 further appearances as Highlands Park during the 2016–17 season as they were relegated to the National First Division.

He scored his first goal for Highlands Park on 7 January 2018 in a 3–0 win away at Super Eagles, and would go on to make 17 appearances, scoring 3, in a season where they would be promoted back to the Premier Division.

=== Black Leopards ===
Despite having a year remaining on his contract at Highlands Park, he joined Black Leopards in October 2018, with him having not made a Premier Division appearance at Highlands Park following their promotion. He made 12 appearances without scoring for Black Leopards during the 2018–19 season, and 15 league appearances, scoring twice, during the 2019–20 season.

== International career ==
In 2007, Katjiukua was called up to the Namibia national football team for the first time ahead of an international friendly against Malawi. He made his debut for Namibia in that match on 6 July 2007 as they defeated Malawi 2–1. He would go on to make two further appearances for Namibia in 2007 against Botswana and Lesotho, both in the 2007 COSAFA Cup as Namibia were knocked out in the group stage. His next appearance for Namibia on 26 March 2008, again against Malawi in a friendly, but did not appear for the national team again until 2011, when he played in a 1–1 draw against Botswana.

Katjiukua was part of the Namibia squad during the 2014 FIFA World Cup qualification and appeared in a 1–1 draw against Nigeria on 12 June 2013, where Namibia were praised for their performance despite conceding a late equaliser. He was also part of the Namibia teams for the 2013 COSAFA Cup, where they were knocked out in the quarter-finals, before being knocked out of the plate competition (a tournament for the teams knocked out in the quarter-finals) by Mozambique, a match in which he appeared. and also in the 2014 African Nations Championship qualification, where they were again knocked out by Mozambique, this time on penalties, with Katjiukua having missed his penalty during the shoot-out.

Katjiukua was part of Namibia's 2015 COSAFA Cup winning squad, and featured in every game of what is Namibia's first and only international tournament victory to date. On 21 May 2015, he scored his first goal for Namibia in a 4–1 win over Zimbabwe. The final saw Namibia beat Mozambique 2–0 with Katjiukua being praised for his defensive performances across the entire tournament. Following Namibia's success at the COSAFA Cup, Katjiukua remained a regular player for the Namibia, and appeared in every match of their 2017 Africa Cup of Nations and 2018 FIFA World Cup qualification campaigns.

As part of Namibia's successful 2019 Africa Cup of Nations qualification campaign, Katjiukua appeared in a 1–0 defeat away to Guinea-Bissau on 10 June 2017 and later a 0–0 draw at home to Guinea-Bissau. He was part of Namibia's provisional 28 man squad for the 2019 Africa Cup of Nations, but was not part of their final squad for the tournament.

On 15 November 2019, he scored his second goal for Namibia; a 76th minute headed winner in a 2–1 home victory over Chad.

== Career statistics ==
=== International ===
As of 6 June 2020

Appearances and goals by national team and year
National team	Year	Apps	Goals
Namibia
Namibia	2007	3	0
Namibia	2008	1	0
Namibia	2011	2	0
Namibia	2013	6	0
Namibia	2014	2	0
Namibia	2015	12	1
Namibia	2016	3	0
Namibia	2017	2	0
Namibia	2018	1	0
Namibia	2019	4	1
Total		36	2

=== International goals ===
As of 6 June 2020. Namibia score listed first, score column indicates score after each Katjiukua goal.

International goals by date, venue, cap, opponent, score, result and competition
No.	Date	Venue	Opponent	Score	Result	Competition	Ref.
1	21 May 2015	Moruleng Stadium, Moruleng, South Africa	Zimbabwe	1–0	4–1	2015 COSAFA Cup	
2	13 November 2019	Sam Nujoma Stadium, Windhoek, Namibia	Chad	2–1	2–1	2021 Africa Cup of Nations qualification	

== Honours ==
Eleven Arrows

- Namibia FA Cup: 2011

African Stars

- Namibia FA Cup: 2013

Lamontville Golden Arrows

- National First Division: 2014–15

Highlands Park

- National First Division: 2017–18

Namibia

- COSAFA Cup: 2015
