= Massama Asselmo =

Chadian footballer (born 1990)

Personal information
- Full name: Massama Asselmo Kiliouto
- Date of birth: 1 June 1990 (age 36)
- Place of birth: Bongor, Chad
- Height: 1.85 m (6 ft 1 in)
- Position: Centre back

Senior career*
Years	Team	Apps	(Gls)
2007–2012	Foullah Edifice	95	(9)
2012–2014	US Bitam		
2015–2016	O'Mbila Nziami		
2017	Colombe Sportive		
2017-2018	Wolaitta Dicha		

International career^{‡}
2010–2015	Chad	13	(0)
- * Club domestic league appearances and goals as of 31 October 2021 ‡ National team caps and goals as of 31 October 2021

Massama Asselmo (born 1 June 1990) is a Chadian football player and a member of the Chad national football team.

== Club career ==
He played club football in Foullah Edifice in Chad where he won national championship in 2011, and Coupe de Ligue de N'Djaména in 2010. He wore number 15, and captained the team. In 2012, he was transferred to US Bitam, in Gabon. In 2015 he moved to O'Mbila Nziami, and in 2017 to Colombe Sportive Sangmélima in Cameroon. In the season 2017/18 he played for Ethiopian club Wolaitta Dicha.

== International career ==
Asselmo played in 2012 Africa Cup of Nations qualification matches against Togo home and away, Botswana home and away, Tunisia home and away, Malawi away. In a match against Botswana on 26 March 2011 he was the captain of the team. So far, he has 13 FIFA official and 5 unofficial caps and 1 unofficial goal for Chad.

== See also ==
- List of Chad international footballers
