= Hamidou =

Hamidou is both a surname and a given name. Notable people with the name include:

Surname:

- Jules Hamidou (born 1987), Chadian footballer
- Nassuir Hamidou (born 2000), Comorian footballer
- Souleymanou Hamidou (born 1973), Cameroonian footballer

Given name:

- Raïs Hamidou (1773–1815), Algerian corsair (Raïs here is used as a title. It comes from the arabic رَئِيس (raʾīs,) which means “leader, chief, head”.
- Hamidou Djibo (born 1985), Nigerien footballer
- Hamidou Diallo (born 1998), American basketball player
- Hamidou Benmessaoud (1935–2013), Moroccan actor
