= Mabaya =

Mabaya is a surname. Notable people with the surname include:

- Brice Mabaya (born 1986), Chadian footballer
- Jean-Philibert Mabaya (born 1949), Congolese businessman, engineer, and politician
