= Pierre Daldoumbe Lama =

Chadian footballer (born 1979)

Personal information
- Full name: Pierre Daldoumbe Lama
- Date of birth: 18 October 1979 (age 47)
- Place of birth: N'Djamena, Chad
- Position: Centre-back

International career
Years	Team	Apps	(Gls)
1997–2003	Chad	19	(0)

Pierre Daldoumbe Lama (born 18 October 1979) is a former Chadian professional football player. He made 19 appearances for the Chad national football team.

== See also ==
- List of Chad international footballers
