= Didier Timothée Mbai =

Chadian footballer (born 1985)

Personal information
- Full name: Didier Timothée Mbai
- Date of birth: 11 August 1985 (age 41)

International career^{‡}
Years	Team	Apps	(Gls)
2003	Chad	2	(0)
- ‡ National team caps and goals as of 5 July 2014

Didier Timothée Mbai (born 11 August 1985) is a former Chadian professional football player. He made two appearances for the Chad national football team.

== See also ==
- List of Chad international footballers
