= Hassan Diallo =

Chadian footballer (born 1989)

Personal information
- Full name: Syriakata Hassan Diallo
- Date of birth: 17 April 1989 (age 37)
- Place of birth: Bol, Chad
- Position: Centre-back

Team information
- Current team: Foullah Edifice

Senior career*
Years	Team	Apps	(Gls)
1999–2013	Renaissance		
2014–2016	Foullah Edifice		
2017	Renaissance		
2018–	Foullah Edifice		

International career
2006–2011	Chad	22	(2)
- * Club domestic league appearances and goals

Syriakata Hassan Diallo (born 17 April 1989) is a Chadian footballer who plays as a centre-back for Chadian club Foullah Edifice. He has represented the Chad national team between 2006 and 2011.

== Career statistics ==
=== International ===
Scores and results list Chad's goal tally first.

Goal	Date	Venue	Opponent	Score	Result	Competition
1.	14 June 2008	Stade Omnisports Idriss Mahamat Ouya, N'Djamena, Chad	Congo	2–1	2–1	2010 FIFA World Cup qualification
2.	6 September 2008	Cairo Military Academy Stadium, Cairo, Egypt	Sudan	2–1	2–1	2010 FIFA World Cup qualification

== See also ==
- List of Chad international footballers
