= Noun (department) =

- Department
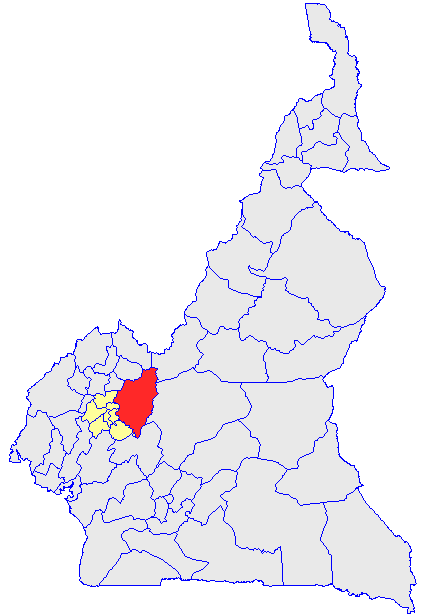
- Department location in Cameroon
- Country: Cameroon
- Province: West Region
- Capital: Foumban

Area
  - Total: 3,000 sq mi (7,700 km^{2})

Population (2019)
  - Total: 1,540,000
- Time zone: UTC+1 (WAT)

Noun is a department of West Region in Cameroon. The department covers an area of 7700 km^{2} and as of 2005 had a total population of 1,540,000. The capital of the department lies at Foumban.

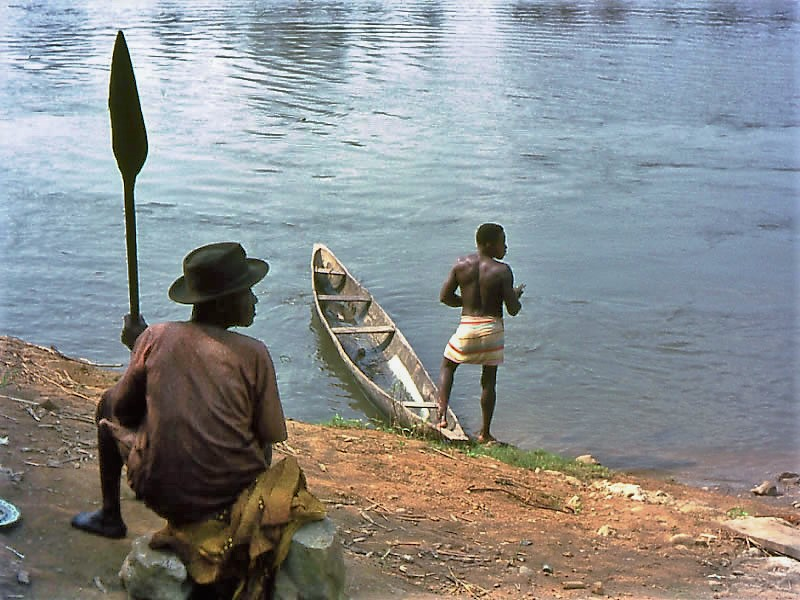
Pirogue on Noun River.

== Subdivisions ==
The division is divided administratively into nine communes and in turn into villages.

=== Communes ===
1. Foumban (urban)
2. Foumbot (urban)
3. Kouoptamo
4. Koutaba
5. Malentouen
6. Massangam
7. Njimom
