= Evariste Djimasdé =

Chadian footballer

Personal information
- Full name: Evariste Djimasdé

International career^{‡}
Years	Team	Apps	(Gls)
1999	Chad	4	(0)
- ‡ National team caps and goals as of 2 July 2014

Evariste Djimasdé is a former Chadian professional football player. He made four appearances for the Chad national football team.

== See also ==
- List of Chad international footballers
