= Allamadji Mbaiguesse =

Chadian footballer

Personal information
- Full name: Allamadji Mbaiguesse

International career^{‡}
Years	Team	Apps	(Gls)
2000	Chad	1	(0)
- ‡ National team caps and goals as of 5 July 2014

Allamadji Mbaiguesse is a former Chadian professional football player. He made one appearance for the Chad national football team.

== See also ==
- List of Chad international footballers
