= Adoum =

Adoum is both a surname and a given name. Notable people with the name include:

- Jorge Enrique Adoum (1926–2009), Ecuadorian writer
- Mahamat Ali Adoum (born 1947), Chadian politician
- Adoum Younousmi (born 1962), Chadian politician
- Abakar Adoum (born 1984), Chadian football player

== See also ==
- Miamete Adoum, village in Central African Republic
- Adouma, ethnic group in Gabon
