= Ricardo Cardoso =

Ricardo Cardoso may refer to:

- Ricardo Cardoso (judoka) (1963–1991), Brazilian judoka
- Ricardo Cardoso (footballer) (born 2001), Santomean footballer
