= Mamadou Bouba =

Chadian footballer (born 1988)

Personal information
- Full name: Mamadou Bouba
- Date of birth: 17 February 1988 (age 38)
- Place of birth: N'Djamena, Chad
- Height: 1.83 m (6 ft 0 in)
- Position: Goalkeeper

Senior career*
Years	Team	Apps	(Gls)
2001–2003	Sahel FC		
2004–2007	Ascot		
2008–2010	Panthère du Ndé		
2011–2012	Ascot		
2013–	Watachim Sinnar		

International career^{‡}
2005–2009	Chad	4	(0)
- * Club domestic league appearances and goals ‡ National team caps and goals as of 5 May 2013

Mamadou Bouba (born 17 February 1988 in N'Djamena, Chad) is a footballer from Chad, who plays as a goalkeeper for Sudanese club Watachim Sinnar.

== Career ==
He started his career with Sahel FC. He moved to Ascot in 2003, where he stayed until 2008, when he moved to Cameroon, where his next club was Panthère du Ndé. Now he plays for Sudanese club Watachim Sinnar.

== International career ==
Bouba debuted for Chad on 27 May 2005 in a friendly match against Sudan (1:1). He also played in the 2008 Africa Cup of Nations qualification matches against South Africa, both home and away. He played on 2006, 2008 and 2009 CEMAC Cup. He was voted the best goalkeeper of the 2008 Cemac Cup in Cameroon. However, most of the CEMAC matches were not counted as FIFA official.

== See also ==
- List of Chad international footballers
