= Mbanguingar Krabe =

Chadian footballer (born 1971)

Personal information
- Full name: Mbanguingar Krabe
- Date of birth: 25 January 1971 (age 55)

International career^{‡}
Years	Team	Apps	(Gls)
1998–2003	Chad	8	(1)
- ‡ National team caps and goals as of 3 July 2014

Mbanguingar Krabe (25 January 1971) is a former Chadian professional football player. He made eight appearances for the Chad national football team.

== See also ==
- List of Chad international footballers
