= Faris Haroun =

Belgian footballer (born 1985)

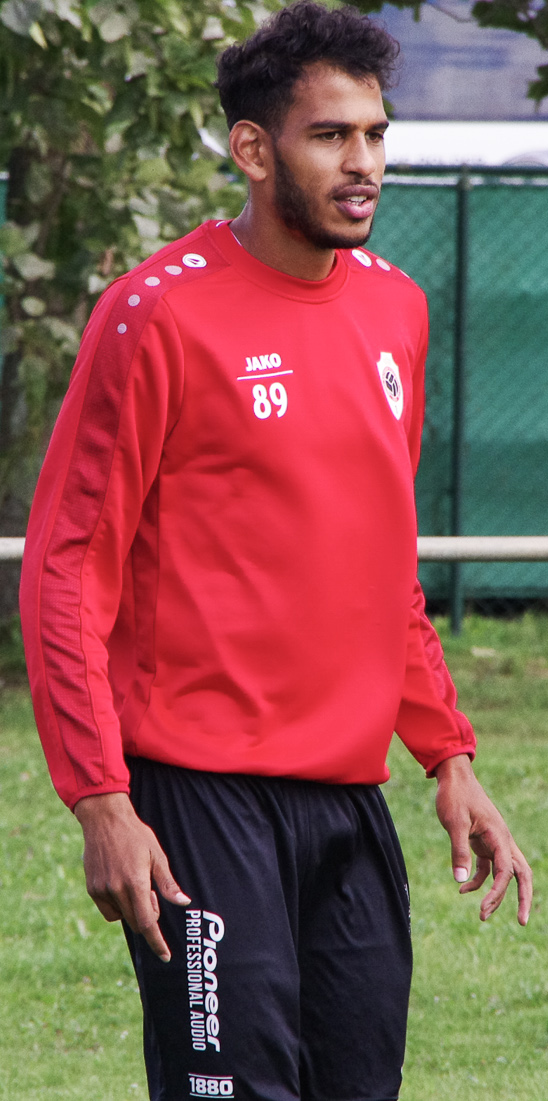
- Haroun with Royal Antwerp in 2017

Personal information
- Full name: Faris Dominguere Jenny Haroun
- Date of birth: 22 September 1985 (age 41)
- Place of birth: Brussels, Belgium
- Height: 1.88 m (6 ft 2 in)
- Position: Defensive midfielder

Youth career
- 1993–1995: Scup Jette
- 1995–2002: R.W.D. Molenbeek
- 2002–2003: RSD Jette

Senior career*
Years	Team	Apps	(Gls)
2003–2008	Genk	104	(16)
2008–2011	Germinal Beerschot	91	(23)
2011–2014	Middlesbrough	50	(6)
2014	Blackpool	9	(0)
2014–2017	Cercle Brugge	59	(8)
2017–2023	Royal Antwerp	142	(9)
Total		455	(62)

International career
2003	Belgium U18	7	(1)
2003–2004	Belgium U19	14	(1)
2004–2008	Belgium U21	24	(4)
2007–2009	Belgium	6	(0)

Managerial career
- 2025: Royal Antwerp (interim)
- * Club domestic league appearances and goals

Faris Dominguere Jenny Haroun (born 22 September 1985) is a Belgian former professional footballer who played as a defensive midfielder. He has also played for the Belgium national team.

== Club career ==
=== K.R.C. Genk ===
Born in Brussels, Belgium, Haroun began playing football at his local club Scup Jette. He then moved to play for R.W.D. Molenbeek and RSD Jette before moving to Genk, where he started his professional career.

Haroun scored on his professional debut for Genk when Kevin Vandenbergh "gave the decisive assist to Haroun who placed the ball past a hopeless Kris Van De Putte", in a 1–0 win against R.A.E.C. Mons on 20 February 2004. He later scored two more goals later in the 2003–04 season, coming against Sint-Truidense and K. Beringen-Heusden-Zolder. Having become a first team regular, Haroun made twelve appearances and scoring three times in all competitions.

At the start of the 2004–05 season, Haroun made his UEFA Intertoto Cup debut, coming on as a 67th-minute substitute, in a 2–0 win against Borussia Dortmund to progress to the next round through away goal. However, he found his playing time, mostly coming from the substitute bench since the start of the season. Despite this, Haroun scored his first goal of the season, in a 3–1 win against K.V. Oostende on 27 November 2004. A month later on 18 December 2004, he scored his second goal of the season, in a 2–1 win against Cercle Brugge. Haroun then scored his third goal of the season, in a 3–1 win against Lokeren on 31 January 2005. By the second half of the season, he continued to find himself in and out of the starting eleven, which saw him placed him placed on the substitute bench. Haroun then scored his fourth goal of the season, in a 3–1 win against Cercle Brugge in the last game of the season. At the end of the 2004–05 season, he went on to make twenty–nine appearances and scoring four times in all competitions.

At the start of the 2005–06 season, Haroun made his UEFA Cup debut, coming on as a 69th-minute substitute, in a 3–0 win against Liepājas Metalurgs to progress through to the next round. He made another UEFA Cup appearance in a 2–2 draw against Litex Lovech, but Genk were eliminated in a return leg after losing 1–0. However, Haroun spent the first three months placed on the substitute bench, having played four matches around this time. By October, he found his playing time, mostly coming on from the substitute bench in a number of matches. Haroun signed a contract extension with the club. At the end of the 2005–06 season, he made twenty–two appearances in all competitions.

Ahead of the 2006–07 season, Haroun was linked a move away from Genk, as they were trying to sell him in the summer transfer window but stayed at the club. After not playing for the first four league matches of the season, he made his appearance of the season, coming on as an 80th-minute substitute, in a 3–1 win against Gent on 10 September 2006. Haroun then featured in the first team in a number of matches despite suffering from injuries along the way. Having spent the first half of the season not scoring a goal, on 27 January 2007 he scored his first goal in a 3–0 win against Lierse. This was followed up by scoring the next three matches against Standard Liège, Cercle Brugge and Gent. Two weeks later on 3 March 2007, Haroun scored his fifth goal of the season, in a 5–0 win against K.S.K. Beveren. Following an impressive display for the side, the club's chairman Jos Vaessen said that if Haroun's departed earlier in the summer, it would have been "catastrophe" within the club's midfield system. However, he suffered a meniscal injury and was substituted in the 20th minute during a 1–1 draw against Anderlecht on 11 March 2007. After the match, Haroun was sidelined for five weeks. On 22 April 2007 he returned to the starting line–up in a 1–0 win against Club Brugge. At the end of the 2006–07 season, he went on to make twenty–three appearances and scoring five times in all competitions.

In the 2007–08 season, Haroun made his UEFA Champions League debut, where he started the whole game, in a 2–1 loss against FK Sarajevo in the first leg of the UEFA Champions League Second Qualifying Round. However, he was demoted to the substitute bench for the next two matches for the side, due to strong competition in the midfield and attacking positions. Haroun made his return to the starting line–up against Germinal Beerschot on 25 August 2007, and set up the club's second goal of the game, in a 2–1. Since returning to the starting line–up, he regained his first team place for the next six matches before missing out with a thigh injury. On 10 November 2007 Haroun made his return to the starting line–up, in a 1–0 win against Charleroi. However, he announced his intention to leave Genk, due to being unhappy being placed on the substitute bench. Amid the transfer speculation, Haroun scored his first goal of the season, in a 5–1 loss against Cercle Brugge on 20 January 2008. Eventually, he stayed and later regained his first team place for the side for the rest of the season. He then scored two goals in two matches on 21 March 2008 and 30 March 2008 against Royal Excel Mouscron and Club Brugge. Haroun then scored his fifth goal of the season, in a 2–2 draw against Zulte Waregem on 2 May 2008. At the end of the 2007–08 season, he went on to make thirty appearances and scoring four times in all competitions.

=== Germinal Beerschot ===
It was announced on 16 July 2008 that Haroun joined Germinal Beerschot on a four–year contract. Upon joining the club, he cited lack of first team opportunities at Genk was a factor of his departure.

After spending weeks due to his international commitment with Belgium U23, Haroun made his Germinal Beerschot debut, where he started the whole game, in a 1–0 loss against K.V.C. Westerlo on 30 August 2008. In a follow–up match, Haroun scored twice, in a 3–0 win against K.S.V. Roeselare. Since making his debut, he quickly became a first team regular, playing in the midfield position. Haroun also stated that he's enjoying football more at Germinal Beerschot than Genk. On 9 November 2008 he scored his second goal of the season in a 3–1 loss against Standard Liège. Haroun then scored two goals in two matches between 18 January 2009 and 24 January 2009 against Genk and FCV Dender EH. After missing one match due to injury, he scored twice on his return from the starting line–up, in a 3–0 win against K.V. Kortrijk. Haroun then scored his eighth goal of the season, in a 3–1 win against K.V. Mechelen on 8 May 2009. At the end of the 2008–09 season, he went on to make thirty–two appearances and scoring eight times in all competitions. For his performance, Haroun was placed second behind Silvio Proto.

In the 2009–10 season, Haroun continued to regain his first team place, playing in the midfield position. Haroun started the season well when he set up an equalising goal for Daniel Cruz in a 1–1 draw against K.S.V. Roeselare in the opening game of the season. Haroun scored his first goal of the season, in a 1–1 draw against Genk on 30 August 2009. This was followed up by scoring in the next two matches against Lokeren and Cercle Brugge. His goal scoring spree continued for the rest of the year, including scoring a brace against K.S.V. Roeselare on 28 November 2009. However, he suffered an injury and was substituted in the 39th minute, as they drew 2–2 against Standard Liège on 5 December 2009. After being sidelined for a month, Haroun made his return to the starting line–up, in a 3–0 loss against K.V. Kortrijk. On 7 March 2010 he scored his ninth goal of the season in a 1–1 draw against Zulte Waregem. Haroun later scored two more goals later in the 2009–10 season. Despite previously stating Haroun would not become a top–scorer earlier in the 2009–10 season, he finished as the club's top scorer with eleven goals in thirty–two appearances in all competitions.

Haroun scored his first goal of the season, in a 2–1 loss against Genk in the opening game of the season. Since the start of the 2010–11 season, he continued to regain his first team place, playing in the midfield position. On 18 September 2010 Haroun scored his second goal of the season in a 1–0 win against K.A.S. Eupen. A weeks later on 26 September 2010, he scored his third goal of the season, in a 2–1 win against Club Brugge. Haroun added two more goals by the end of the year. He appeared in every match since the start of the season until he missed one match in late–January. Haroun then scored his sixth goal of the season, in a 2–2 draw against Lierse on 12 February 2011. At the end of the 2010–11 season, he went on to make thirty–six appearances and scoring six times in all competitions. It was announced that Haroun would be leaving the club when the season has been concluded.

=== Middlesbrough ===
On 18 August 2011, Middlesbrough completed the signing of Haroun, on a three-year contract, following a successful trial. Middlesbrough manager Tony Mowbray said "It's good to get the deal completed. Faris has looked good in training", "He's fit and athletic, has a love of the game and is full of enthusiasm."

Haroun made a dream start to his Middlesbrough career, scoring on his debut in a 3–1 win over Birmingham City on 21 August 2011. His first team start came three days later on 24 August 2011 when he helped Middlesbrough to a 2–0 victory over Peterborough United in the League Cup second round. Since making his debut, Haroun has been involved in a number of matches in the first team. Haroun scored his second goal for Middlesbrough in a 3–2 victory against Cardiff City on 17 December 2011. Despite being plagued with injuries throughout the 2011–12 season, he went on to make thirty–five appearances and scoring two times in all competitions.

At the start of the 2012–13 season, Haroun made three league starts before being fringe from the first team for a month. He then started six league matches between 6 October 2012 and 6 November 2012. Haroun scored his first goal for Middlesbrough in the 2012–13 season against Hull City, in which he dribbled around the keeper in a 2–0 victory. However, during a 1–0 loss against Cardiff City on 17 November 2012, Haroun suffered a calf injury and was substituted in the 30th minute. After the match, it was announced that he was sidelined for two weeks. On 8 December 2012 Haroun returned to the starting line–up against Peterborough United and scored his second and third goals of the season in a 3–2 win. However, during the match, he suffered a hamstring injury and was substituted as a result; which saw him sidelined for a month. On 12 January 2013 Haroun returned to the starting line–up in a 2–1 loss against Watford. A month later on 16 February 2013, he scored his fourth goal of the season, in a 4–1 loss against Crystal Palace. Later in the 2012–13 season, Haroun later found himself in and out of the starting line–up, which saw him placed on the substitute bench. He finished the season, making twenty–nine appearances and scoring four times in all competitions.

Haroun made his only appearance for the club in the 2013–14 season came in the opening game of the season, where he played 29 minutes, in a 2–1 loss against Leicester City. However, he found his first team opportunities limited for the rest of his Middlesbrough's career. As a result, Haroun was linked a move away from the club, with Romanian club Astra Giurgiu. On 30 January 2014, Haroun's contract at Middlesbrough was cancelled by mutual consent.

=== Blackpool ===
On 31 January 2014, Haroun completed a move to Blackpool until the end of the 2013–14 season.

Haroun made his Blackpool debut, starting the whole game, in a 2–0 loss against Blackburn Rovers on 1 February 2014. Since making his debut for the club, he started the next four matches before being demoted to the substitute bench for the rest of the season. At the end of the 2013–14 season, making nine appearances in all competitions, Haroun was released by the club after they decided not to offer a new contract.

=== Cercle Brugge ===
After spending six months as a free agent player, Haroun signed for Cercle Brugge on 12 November 2014.

Haroun made his Cercle Brugge debut, playing in the midfield position, in a 4–0 loss against Gent on 22 November 2014. Since making his debut for the club, he quickly established himself in the starting line–up, playing in the midfield position. However, Haroun suffered ankle injury during a 2–0 win against RSC Charleroi on 17 January 2015 and missed two matches as a result. On 8 February 2015 he returned from injury against Anderlecht but suffered an ankle injury and was substituted in the 24th minute, as the side lost 2–0. As a result, Haroun was sidelined for a month and didn't make his return on 15 March 2015, in a 3–2 loss against KV Mechelen. He played four more matches, as Cercle Brugge lost Play-Off III to SK Lierse and relegate to second division. At the end of the 2014–15 season, Haroun made thirteen appearances in all competitions.

Ahead of the 2015–16 season, Haroun stayed at Cercle Brugge despite being relegated last season. At the start of the season, he continued to regain his first team place, playing in the midfield position. On 12 September 2015 Haroun scored his first goal for the club in a 3–3 draw against ASV Geel. This was followed up by scoring his second goal for the club, in a 1–0 win against Patro Eisden. He started in every match until he missed one match, due to suspension. After serving a one match suspension, Haroun returned to the starting line–up, in a 1–1 draw against R.W.S. Bruxelles on 14 November 2015. During the 2015–16 season, he captained the side in a number of matches for the side. On 17 January 2016 Haroun scored his third goal for the club in a 4–0 defeat of R.F.C. Seraing. He later added two more goals later in the season, scoring against K.S.K. Heist and K.V.V. Coxyde. Despite being suspended for second time later in the 2015–16 season, Haroun made thirty appearances and scoring five times in all competitions.

Ahead of the 2016–17 season, Haroun was linked with a move to Sint-Truidense, but eventually stayed at Cercle Brugge. In the opening game of the season against Royal Antwerp, he was sent–off for a second bookable offence, in a 1–1 draw. After serving a one match suspension, Haroun returned to the starting line–up against A.F.C. Tubize and set up the club's third goal of the game, in a 4–1 win on 21 August 2016. Three weeks later on 10 September 2016, he set two goals, in a 2–1 win against Royale Union Saint-Gilloise. This was followed up by scoring his first goal of the season, in a 2–1 loss against KSV Roeselare. Since the start of the 2016–17 season, he continued to establish himself in the starting eleven, as well as, captain. However, Haroun was sent–off for the second time this season for a second bookable offence, in a 2–1 loss against Royal Antwerp. After serving a one match suspension, he scored on his return, in a 3–2 loss against Royale Union Saint-Gilloise on 9 October 2016. Haroun then scored his third goal of the season, in a 1–0 win against Royale Union Saint-Gilloise on 3 December 2016. By the time he departed from the club, Haroun made eighteen appearances and scoring three times in all competitions.

=== Royal Antwerp ===
Haroun signed for Royal Antwerp on 26 December 2016, signing a two–year contract. Upon joining the club, he said: "I was certainly not tired of Cercle, but when Antwerp called, it started to itch. It is also important that I know the trainer and that he supports my arrival. The main thing is that I want to give myself completely for Antwerp. I am someone who always wets my chest and gives everything for the team. I want to wear the Antwerp logo in a dignified way."

Haroun made his Royal Antwerp debut against KSV Roeselare, starting the whole game, in a 1–0 win on 6 January 2017. Since making his debut for the club, he quickly established himself in the starting eleven, playing in the midfield position. However, during a match against KSV Roeselare on 18 February 2017, Haroun suffered a hamstring injury and had to be substituted in the 36th minute, as they won 2–1. After being sidelined for one match, he made his return to the starting line–up against KSV Roeselare in the first leg play–offs final and set up the club's first goal of the game, in a 3–1 win. In the second leg play–offs final, Haroun started the match and helped the side win 2–1 to gain promotion to the Belgian First Division A next season. At the end of the 2016–17 season, he went on to make nine appearances for the club in all competitions.

At the start of the 2017–18 season, Haroun continued to establish himself in the starting eleven, playing in the midfield position, as well as, captain. On 19 August 2017 he scored his first goal of the season in a 2–1 win against KV Mechelen. Haroun started in every match since the start of the season until he was suspended for one match. After serving a one match suspension, Haroun returned to the starting line–up, in a 1–0 win against K.A.S. Eupen on 18 November 2017. He then scored his second goal of the season, in a 1–0 win against Royal Excel Mouscron on 9 December 2017. Haroun then started for the next four matches for the side before suffering a calf injury that saw him miss one match. He then made his return to the starting line–up, starting the whole game, in a 1–1 draw against Charleroi on 27 January 2018. Haroun scored his third goal of the season, in a 2–0 win against K.A.S. Eupen on 3 May 2018. He appeared in six matches in the Europa League play-offs, as the club failed to earn a UEFA Europa League spot. At the end of the 2017–18 season, Haroun made thirty–three appearances and scoring three times in all competitions.

In the 2018–19 season, Haroun continued to establish himself in the starting eleven, playing in the midfield position, as well as, captain. On 19 August 2018 he scored his first goal of the season in a 1–1 draw against Club Brugge. A month later, Haroun signed a contract extension with the club, keeping him until 2020. Two days later on 16 September 2018, he scored his second goal of the season, in a 5–1 win against Zulte Waregem. Haroun scored his third goal of the season, in a 2–2 draw against Gent. He later added two more goals throughout October, scoring against Lokeren and Waasland-Beveren. Since the start of the 2018–19 season, Haroun started in every match until he was suspended for one match. After serving a one match suspension, Haroun returned to starting line–up, in a 3–1 loss against Sint-Truidense on 2 December 2018. However, his return was short–lived when he suffered a quadriceps injury. But Haroun made his return to the starting line–up, in a 2–0 loss against Waasland-Beveren on 15 December 2018. However, he suffered a hamstring injury that saw him miss two matches. On 2 February 2019 Haroun returned to the starting line–up in a 2–0 win against Oostende. Despite being sidelined on three more occasions later in the 2018–19 season, he helped the side finish fourth place in the league. Haroun finished the season, making thirty–four appearances and scoring five times in all competitions.

Ahead of the 2019–20 season, Haroun was linked a move away from the club, as Gent was interested in signing him. He ended the transfer speculation by signing a two–year contract, keeping him until 2021. At the start of the 2019–20 season, Haroun continued to establish himself in the starting eleven, playing in the midfield position, as well as, captain. He set up the club's first goal of the season, in a 4–1 win against Waasland-Beveren on 4 August 2019. Haroun started in every match until he fractured his arm that kept him out for a month. On 19 January 2020 Haroun started in a 2–1 win against Cercle Brugge. However, his return was short–lived when he was suspended for one match. But Haroun made his return to the starting line–up, starting the whole game, in a 1–0 loss against Club Brugge on 2 February 2020. He then played in both legs of the Belgian Cup semi–finals against K.V. Kortrijk and beat them 2–1 on aggregate to reach the final. However, the season was cancelled because of the COVID-19 pandemic, resulting in the club finishing in fourth place in the league. By the end of the 2019–20 season, Haroun had made 33 appearances in all competitions.

== International career ==
Haroun is eligible to play for Belgium and Chad.

=== Youth career ===
Having played for Belgium U18 and Belgium U19, Haroun was called up for the U19 side for the UEFA European Under-19 Championship in Switzerland. He played all three matches in the tournament, as Belgium U19 were eliminated in the Group Stage.

A month later, Haroun was called up to the Belgium U21 squad and made three appearances for the U21 side by the end of 2004. He then scored his first Belgium U21 goal, in a 2–1 win against Bosnia and Herzegovina U21 on 25 March 2005. Haroun later scored his second Belgium U21 goal, in another 2–1 win, this time against Lithuania U21 on 11 October 2005. A year later on 6 September 2006, he scored a brace, in a 2–1 win against Greece U21. It was announced on 12 May 2007 that Haroun was called up to the U21 squad for the UEFA European Under-21 Championship in Netherlands. He appeared four times in the tournament, as Belgium U21 reached the semi–finals.

In July 2008, Haroun was called up to the squad for the 2008 Summer Olympics. He made his tournament debut, starting the whole game, in a 2–0 win against China. In a follow–up match against New Zealand, Haroun scored his first goal of the tournament, in a 1–0 win. He helped the side reach the semi–finals, where they finished in fourth place. Despite this, Haroun played five times in the tournament.

=== Senior career ===
It was announced on 16 May 2007 that Haroun was called up to the Belgium squad for the first time in his career. He made his Belgium debut on 6 June 2007, coming on as a 55th-minute substitute, in a 2–0 loss against Finland. Haroun later made three more appearances by the end of the year, as the national side unsuccessfully for the UEFA Euro 2008 tournament.

Two years later in May, Haroun was called up to Belgium once again. He started in both matches against Chile and Japan.

== Managerial career ==
In November 2025, Haroun was appointed as caretaker coach of Royal Antwerp along with Robert Molenaar following the dismissal of Stef Wils. On his debut on 30 November, he led his team to a 1–0 away win over Club Brugge.

== Personal life ==
At one point, Haroun was engaged to Marina, but since broken up. Haroun resided with his Australian wife, Katie Sinclair and became a first time father when his wife gave birth to a baby boy.

Faris is the elder brother of Nadjim Haroun and the cousin of Kévin Nicaise, both of whom are members of the Chad national football team.

== Career statistics ==
=== Club ===
Appearances and goals by club, season and competition
Club	Season	League			National cup (Note: Includes Belgian Cup, FA Cup)		League cup (Note: Includes Football League Cup)		Continental		Total	
Club	Season	Division	Apps	Goals	Apps	Goals	Apps	Goals	Apps	Goals	Apps	Goals
Genk	2003–04	Belgian Pro League	12	3			–		–		12	3
Genk	2004–05	Belgian Pro League	23	4			–				23	4
Genk	2005–06	Belgian Pro League	20	0			–				20	0
Genk	2006–07	Belgian Pro League	21	5			–		–		21	5
Genk	2007–08	Belgian Pro League	28	4			–				28	4
Genk	Total		104	16	0	0	0	0	0	0	104	16
Beerschot	2008–09	Belgian Pro League	31	8			–				31	8
Beerschot	2009–10	Belgian Pro League	31 (Note: Includes Europa League Playoff)	10			–		–		31	10
Beerschot	2010–11	Belgian Pro League	29 (Note: Includes Europa League Playoff)	5			–		–		29	5
Beerschot	Total		91	23	0	0	0	0	0	0	91	23
Middlesbrough	2011–12	Championship	32	2	1	0	2	0	–		35	2
Middlesbrough	2012–13	Championship	23	4	2	0	4	0	–		29	4
Middlesbrough	Total		55	6	3	0	6	0	0	0	64	6
Career total			250	45	3	0	6	0	0	0	259	45

== Honours ==
Genk

- Jupiler League runner-up: 2006–07

Antwerp

- Belgian Pro League: 2022–23
- Belgian Cup: 2019–20, 2022–23
