= Maigue (disambiguation) =

Maigue may refer to:

- River Maigue, in counties Cork and Limerick, Ireland
- Another name for Monasteranenagh Abbey, a derelict medieval friary in County Limerick, Ireland
- Maigue Poets, 18th century group of poets based in Croom, County Limerick, Ireland
- Maigué Abbas (born 1989), Chadian footballer
- Lara Maigue (born 1991), Filipino singer-songwriter
