= Kévin Nicaise =

Chadian footballer (born 1985)

Personal information
- Full name: Kévin Nicaise Tatila
- Date of birth: 17 April 1985 (age 41)
- Place of birth: Brussels, Belgium
- Height: 1.92 m (6 ft 4 in)
- Position: Centre-back

Team information
- Current team: Young Reds (manager)

Senior career*
Years	Team	Apps	(Gls)
2005–2009	Saint Gilloise	97	(5)
2009–2011	URS Centre	46	(2)
2011–2012	URS Centre	29	(1)
2012–2014	FC Brussels	48	(0)
2014–2018	FCV Dender EH	109	(7)
2018–2020	Léopold		

International career
2012–2016	Chad	12	(0)

Managerial career
- 2019: Léopold (player-manager)
- 2020: Léopold (player-manager)
- 2020: Chad (assistant)
- 2022–2023: Rupel Boom
- 2023–2025: Chad
- 2025–: Young Reds
- * Club domestic league appearances and goals

Kévin Nicaise Tatila (Arabic: كيفين نيكايسي; born 17 April 1985) is a former footballer who played as a centre back and current manager of Young Reds, the reserve team of Royal Antwerp. Born in Belgium, he represented Chad internationally.

== International career ==
Nicaise debuted for Chad on 29 February 2012 in a match against Malawi.

== Coaching career ==
=== Beginning of coaching career ===
Nicaise joined Léopold FC in the summer 2018. Ahead of the 2019–20 season, he was appointed player-manager of the club after the departure of Thierry Blindenbergh. In October 2019, Vincent Kohl was hired to help Kevin out with the team. On 1 December 2019, Nicaise was replaced by Olivier Suray and continued as a player. Suray was fired on 9 February 2020 and Nicaise was again appointed manager, but this time, he preferred to stay on the bench to focus on coaching. Nicaise left Léopold at the end of the season, as the club was relegated.

In July 2020, he started a job as a physical coach at K.S.K. Heist and in August 2020, he was also hired as a scout at R.S.C. Anderlecht. Beside that, he was also supporting youngsters at Foot-Elite-Etude in Woluwe-Saint-Lambert.

In October 2020 it was confirmed, Nicaise assisted Chad's national coach, Emmanuel Trégoat, on an internship in Tourcoing.

=== Rupel Boom ===
In May 2022 it was confirmed, that Nicaise had left his position at K.S.K. Heist together with the club's manager, Stéphane Demets, to join Rupel Boom. The club further stated that Nicaise would act as a physical trainer at the club under manager Demets.

In early November 2022, Demets was sacked as manager and his replacement, Pascal Pilotte, was sacked on 17 December 2022. In conjunction with Pilotte's sacking, Nicaise was appointed as the new interim coach alongside Yassine Salmi. On 12 April 2023, it was confirmed that Sam Vermeylen would take over for Nicoise from the upcoming season, meaning Nicoise would continue until the end of the season, after which he would leave Rupel Boom.

=== Chad ===
On 12 October 2023, it was confirmed that 38-year-old Nicoise had been hired as head coach of the Chad national team. He took over the position from Djimtan Yatamadji. He left this role at the end of his contract in February 2025.

=== Young Reds ===
He was appointed as manager of Young Reds, the reserve team of Royal Antwerp, in June 2025.

== Personal life ==
Kevin is the cousin of Faris Haroun who represents the Belgium national football team, and Faris' younger brother Nadjim Haroun who represents the Chad national football team.

== Managerial statistics ==
As of match played 25 March 2025

Managerial record by team and tenure
Team	Nat	From	To	Record					Ref.
Team	Nat	From	To	G	W	D	L	Win %	Ref.
Chad		October 2023	present	18	2	5	11	11.11	
Career Total				18	2	5	11	11.11	—
