= Nadjim Haroun =

Chadian footballer (born 1988)

Personal information
- Full name: Nadjim Haroun
- Date of birth: 10 June 1988 (age 38)
- Place of birth: Jette, Belgium
- Height: 1.86 m (6 ft 1 in)
- Positions: Centre midfielder; attacking midfielder; left-back

Team information
- Current team: Bierbeek HO

Senior career*
Years	Team	Apps	(Gls)
2009–2010	Beerschot AC	3	(1)
2010–2011	FCV Dender EH	0	(0)
2011–2012	AGOVV Apeldoorn	4	(1)
2012	K.V.K. Tienen	7	(1)
2012–2013	Saint-Gilloise	21	(1)
2013–2014	KSV Bornem	16	(2)
2014–2018	KVK Tienen		
2018-	Bierbeek HO		

International career^{‡}
2012–	Chad	7	(1)
- * Club domestic league appearances and goals as of 24 September 2019 ‡ National team caps and goals as of 24 September 2019

Nadjim Haroun (born 10 June 1988) is a Chadian footballer who plays for Bierbeek HO in Belgium and the Chad national team. He is the younger brother of Faris Haroun, a Belgian footballer playing in Royal Antwerp.

== Personal life ==
Nadjim was born in Jette, Belgium, and is a brother of Faris Haroun who represented the Belgium national team, and the cousin of Kévin Nicaise who represents the Chad national team.

== See also ==
- List of Chad international footballers
