= Ngouloure Mahamat =

Cameroonian footballer

Personal information
- Date of birth: 1 September 1990 (age 36)
- Place of birth: Foumban, Cameroon
- Height: 1.78 m (5 ft 10 in)
- Position: Centre back

Youth career
- Bolívar
- Unión Maestranza

Senior career*
Years	Team	Apps	(Gls)
2008–2010	Unión Maestranza		
2010	ABB		
2011–2012	Cobreloa		
2012	→ Naval (loan)		
2012	→ Barnechea (loan)		
2015–2016	Municipal Mejillones	6	(0)
2017	Unión Maestranza		

International career
- Cameroon U17
- * Club domestic league appearances and goals

Ngouloure Mahamat (born 1 September 1990) is a Cameroonian footballer who last played for Bolivian side Unión Maestranza as a centre back.

== Club career ==
Mahamat came to Bolívar Youth Team from his birth country. After playing for some clubs in Bolivia and taking a test in Deportes Iquique, he signed with Cobreloa in the Chilean Primera División. In 2015, he signed with Municipal Mejillones in the Chilean Segunda División, making six appearances. In 2017, he returned to Bolivia to play for Unión Maestranza.

== International career ==
Mahamat represented Cameroon U17.

== Personal life ==
Born in Foumban, has seven brothers and speaks four languages, which are French, Spanish, English and Njimom. He declared during an interview with Chilean newspaper Lun that his idol was Marc Vivien Foe and in his death time he wept inconsolably and was motivation for him to be future footballer.

In 2013, he worked as a miner at the Codelco's Radomiro Tomic mine after being released by Cobreloa.
