= Hassane Brahim =

Chadian footballer (born 1994)

Hassan Brahim
Personal information
- Full name: Hassan Brahim Djibrine
- Date of birth: 16 November 1994 (age 31)
- Place of birth: N'Djamena, Chad
- Height: 1.86 m (6 ft 1 in)
- Position: Striker

Team information
- Current team: Etincelles

Senior career*
Years	Team	Apps	(Gls)
2010–2015	Elect-Sport		(19)
2016	Ascot		
2016–2018	Mangasport		(16)
2019–2020	Elect-Sport		
2020–2021	Etincelles		
2021-2022	FC Gasogi United		
2022-2023	FC Nouadhibou		
2023-	AS Vita Club	0	(0)

International career^{‡}
2014–2015	Chad	3	(0)
- * Club domestic league appearances and goals as of 31 October 2021 ‡ National team caps and goals as of 31 October 2021

Hassane Brahim (Arabic: حسن إبراهيم; 16 November 1994) is a Chadian football player. He has made three appearances for the Chad national football team.

== Career ==
Hassane won Coupe de Ligue de N'Djaména with Elect in 2012 and 2014, and played with his club in CAF Confederation Cup 2 times: in 2013 and 2015. He was the club captain. He currently plays for Mangasport in Gabon. He was best goalscorer of the season 2014 in Chad, with 19 goals, and best goalscorer of the Gabonese D1 league in season 2016/17, with 16 goals.

== International career ==
Hassane debuted for Chad on 15 April 2014 in Doha, in a friendly match against Yemen.

== See also ==
- List of Chad international footballers
