= Mondésir Alladjim =

Chadian footballer (born 1986)

Personal information
- Full name: Mondésir Alladjim
- Date of birth: 10 February 1986 (age 40)
- Place of birth: N'Djamena, Chad
- Position: Centre-back

Team information
- Current team: Renaissance

Senior career*
Years	Team	Apps	(Gls)
2006–2008	Renaissance		
2008–2009	Delta Téléstar		
2009	Renaissance		
2009–2011	En Avant Estuaire		
2011–2014	Renaissance		
2015	Foullah Edifice		
2016–	Renaissance		

International career^{‡}
2008–	Chad	12	(0)
- * Club domestic league appearances and goals as of 4 July 2017 ‡ National team caps and goals as of 4 July 2017

Mondesir Alladjim (born 10 February 1986) is a Chadian football defender who currently plays for Renaissance. He is also a member of Chad national football team where he plays centre-back position. He has 12 caps for national team and was a part of qualifying campaign for 2010 World Cup, as well as 2012 Africa Cup of Nations.
