= Oumar Abakar =

Chadian footballer (born 1979)

Personal information
- Full name: Oumar Abakar
- Date of birth: 1 September 1979 (age 47)
- Place of birth: N'Djamena, Chad
- Height: 1.83 m (6 ft 0 in)
- Positions: Sweeper; centre-back

Senior career*
Years	Team	Apps	(Gls)
1998–2000	Renaissance		
2000–2006	Arras		
2006–2011	CS Avion		
2011–2013	Arras		

International career
1999–2006	Chad	14	(1)
- * Club domestic league appearances and goals

Oumar Abakar (born 1 September 1979) is a Chadian professional football player. He made 14 appearances for the Chad national football team.

== See also ==
- List of Chad international footballers
