= Léger Djimrangar =

Chadian footballer (born 1987)

Personal information
- Full name: Leger Djimrangar
- Date of birth: 2 October 1987 (age 39)
- Place of birth: N'Djamena, Chad
- Height: 1.83 m (6 ft 0 in)
- Positions: Left wing; attacking midfielder

Team information
- Current team: AS CotonTchad

Youth career
- Tourbillon

Senior career*
Years	Team	Apps	(Gls)
2006–2010	Tourbillon		
2010–2012	Al Nasr		
2012–2014	Difaa El Jadida	43	(5)
2015	Foullah Edifice		
2015-2017	Missile FC		
2018-2019	Elect-Sport		
2020–	ASCot		

International career^{‡}
2007–	Chad	27	(10)
- * Club domestic league appearances and goals as of 31 October 2021 ‡ National team caps and goals as of 21 February 2022

Léger Djimrangar (Arabic: ليقر جمرانقار; born 2 October 1987) is a Chadian footballer who plays as a midfielder for AS CotonTchad and the Chad national football team.

== Career ==
He played for Egyptian club Al Nasr, where he came from FC Tourbillon N'Djamena. He won Chadian Cup and Super Cup in 2008. From 2012 to 2015 he was the member of Difaa El Jadida from Morocco. He moved to Foullah Edifice in 2014. After two seasons in Missile FC in Gabon, he moved to Elect-Sport in 2018.

== International career ==
Djimrangar is a member of Chad national football team, where he plays on left wing position. He has 28 caps for national team and seven goals, and was a part of qualifying campaign for 2010 World Cup, 2012 Africa Cup of Nations, 2013 Africa Cup of Nations and 2017 Africa Cup of Nations. He also scored three unofficial goals for the national team.

== International goals ==
#	Date	Venue	Opponent	Score	Result	Competition
1	9 September 2007	Stade Omnisports Idriss Mahamat Ouya, N'Djamena, Chad	Congo	1–1	1–1	2008 Africa Cup of Nations qualification
2	10 September 2008	Cairo Military Academy Stadium, Cairo, Egypt	Sudan	1–1	1–3	2010 FIFA World Cup qualification
3	1 July 2010	Stade Omnisports Idriss Mahamat Ouya, N'Djamena, Chad	Togo	1–0	2–2	2012 Africa Cup of Nations qualification
4	29 February 2012	Stade Omnisports Idriss Mahamat Ouya, N'Djamena, Chad	Malawi	2–1	3–2	2013 Africa Cup of Nations qualification
5	29 February 2012	Stade Omnisports Idriss Mahamat Ouya, N'Djamena, Chad	Malawi	3–1	3–2	2013 Africa Cup of Nations qualification
6	9 December 2014	Estadio de Bata, Bata, Guinea-Bissau	Equatorial Guinea	1–0	2–0	Friendly
7	14 December 2014	Estadio de Bata, Bata, Guinea-Bissau	Congo	1–0	3–2	Friendly
8	14 December 2014	Estadio de Bata, Bata, Guinea-Bissau	Congo	2–0	3–2	Friendly
9	10 October 2015	Stade Omnisports Idriss Mahamat Ouya, N'Djamena, Chad	Sierra Leone	1–0	1–0	2018 FIFA World Cup qualification
10	13 October 2015	Adokiye Amiesimaka Stadium, Port Harcourt, Nigeria	Sierra Leone	1–0	1–2	2018 FIFA World Cup qualification

== See also ==
- List of Chad international footballers
