= Hassan Hissein =

Chadian footballer (born 1992)

Personal information
- Full name: Hassan Hissein
- Date of birth: 20 May 1992 (age 34)
- Place of birth: Wadi Fira, Chad
- Height: 1.82 m (6 ft 0 in)
- Positions: Right back; midfielder; striker

Team information
- Current team: El-Kanemi Warriors
- Number: 8

Youth career
- 2004––2006: Foullah Edifice

Senior career*
Years	Team	Apps	(Gls)
2006–2013	Foullah Edifice		
2013–	El-Kanemi Warriors		

International career^{‡}
2010–	Chad	10	(0)
- * Club domestic league appearances and goals ‡ National team caps and goals as of 1 September 2015

Hassan Hissein (born 20 May 1992) is a Chadian footballer who plays as striker for El-Kanemi Warriors and the Chad national football team.

== Career ==
He played for Foullah Edifice in Chadian Premier Ligue. Now he plays for El-Kanemi Warriors in Nigeria.

On 8 May 2012, Hissein's agent announced that 3 Premier League clubs were looking at the youngster. These clubs turned out to be Sunderland, Liverpool and Newcastle.

== International ==
Hissein debuted for Chad on 17 November 2010, in a match against Togo in Lomé. So far, he has earned 10 FIFA official and 8 unofficial caps for Chad.

== See also ==
- List of Chad international footballers
