= Abakar Adoum =

Chadian footballer (born 1984)

Personal information
- Full name: Abakar Adoum
- Date of birth: 18 August 1984 (age 42)
- Place of birth: N'Djamena, Chad

International career^{‡}
Years	Team	Apps	(Gls)
2007–2012	Chad	3	(0)
- ‡ National team caps and goals as of 18 June 2014

Abakar Adoum (born 18 August 1984) is a retired Chadian football player. He has made three appearances for the Chad national football team.

== See also ==
- List of Chad international footballers
