= Mbairamadji Dillah =

Chadian footballer (born 1985)

Personal information
- Date of birth: 18 September 1985 (age 41)
- Place of birth: N'Djamena, Chad
- Position: Goalkeeper

Team information
- Current team: Gazelle

Senior career*
Years	Team	Apps	(Gls)
2010	Foullah Edifice		
2011–2012	Gazelle		
2013	Tourbillon FC		
2014-2015	Foullah Edifice		
2015–2018	O'Mbilia Nzami		
2019–	Gazelle		

International career^{‡}
2013–	Chad	7	(0)
- * Club domestic league appearances and goals as of 31 October 2021 ‡ National team caps and goals as of 31 October 2021

Mbairamadji Dillah (born 18 September 1985) is a Chadian professional football player. He has made eight appearances for the Chad national football team.

== Club career ==
Dillah won the Chadian championship in 2014 with club Foullah Edifice. After several Chadian clubs, Dillah joined Gabonese club O'Mbilia Nzami in 2014. He is right-footed.

== International career ==
Although Dillah debuted for Chad in CEMAC 2013 tournament, as CEMAC matches are not considered FIFA official, his first official match for national team was against Malawi on 17 May 2014, which Chad lost 2–0. He was part of the team that won CEMAC 2014.

== See also ==
- List of Chad international footballers
