= Dylan Collard =

Footballer (born 2000)

Personal information
- Full name: Dylan João Raymond Collard Jr.
- Date of birth: 16 April 2000 (age 26)
- Place of birth: Sydney, New South Wales, Australia
- Height: 2.01 m (6 ft 7 in)
- Position: Centre-back

Team information
- Current team: Lusitânia
- Number: 4

Youth career
- Quakers Hill Tigers
- 2011–2014: Benfica
- 2014–2015: Casa Pia
- 2015: CF Esperança de Lagos
- 2015–2017: Nacional
- 2017: Belenenses
- 2017–2018: Nacional
- 2018–2019: Tondela

Senior career*
Years	Team	Apps	(Gls)
2019–2020	Lusitano	11	(0)
2020	Stal Rzeszów	1	(0)
2020–2024	Marítimo B	64	(9)
2023–2024	Marítimo	18	(0)
2024–	Lusitânia	54	(9)

International career^{‡}
2022–	Mauritius	16	(1)
- * Club domestic league appearances and goals as of 20 June 2026 ‡ National team caps and goals as of 13 June 2025

Dylan João Raymond Collard Jr. (born 16 April 2000) is a professional footballer who plays as a centre-back for Liga Portugal 2 club Lusitânia. Born in Australia, he plays for the Mauritius national team.

Collard played youth football with Quakers Hill Tigers in Australia before moving to Portugal to join Benfica's academy. After playing for various youth teams in Portugal, Collard made his senior debut for Lusitano in the Campeonato de Portugal in 2019. After a short time at Polish II Liga side Stal Rzeszów, Collard returned to Portugal to sign for Marítimo, where he played for the reserve team and made his Liga Portugal debut in 2023.

Collard made his debut for the Mauritian national team in 2022.

== Early life ==
Collard was born in the Sydney suburb of Randwick, New South Wales, and moved to Parklea at a young age. He began playing football at age four, and his first football club was Quakers Hill Tigers.

After attracting interest from scouts from Portuguese side Benfica while on a family trip to Portugal, Collard subsequently joined the club's academy, where he remained for several seasons.

== Club career ==
In June 2019, Collard signed for Campeonato de Portugal side Lusitano, his first senior deal. Collard was a frequent starter in his time at the club.

Collard joined Polish II Liga side Stal Rzeszów in February 2020. He made only one competitive appearance for the club.

In October 2020, Collard returned to Portugal to sign with Marítimo.

Collard signed for Lusitânia for the 2024–25 season and played a pivotal role in winning the Liga 3 Championship and getting promoted to Liga Portugal 2.

== International career ==
In March 2022, Collard was called up to the Mauritius national team, eligible through his Mauritian father.

Collard made his international debut for Mauritius on 24 March 2022, playing as a forward in a 1–0 loss to São Tomé and Príncipe in 2023 Africa Cup of Nations qualification. He scored his first international goal in the second leg, three days later, which finished 3–3.

Collard played in all three matches in the 2025 COSAFA Cup against South Africa, Mozambique, and Zimbabwe. He earned the Man of the Match Award against South Africa.

== Career statistics ==
=== International ===
As of match played 27 April 2025
Mauritius score listed first, score column indicates score after each Collard goal

List of international goals scored by Dylan Collard
No.	Date	Venue	Cap	Opponent	Score	Result	Competition	Ref.
1	27 March 2022	Complexe Sportif de Côte d'Or, Saint Pierre, Mauritius	2	São Tomé and Príncipe	2–2	3–3	2023 Africa Cup of Nations qualification	

== Honours ==
Lusitânia

- Liga 3: 2024–25

== See also ==
- List of foreign Primeira Liga players
