= Djimtan Yatamadji =

Chadian football manager

Personal information
- Date of birth: 16 February 1968 (age 58)
- Place of birth: Chad
- Height: 5 ft 9 in (1.75 m)

Managerial career
- Years: Team
- Foullah Edifice
- 2019: Chad
- 2020–2023: Chad

Djimtan Yatamadji (born 16 February 1968) is a Chadian football manager, currently managing Chad.

== Managerial career ==
In 2019, Yatamadji managed Chad during the country's 2020 African Nations Championship qualification campaign. In October 2020, whilst managing LINAFOOT club Foullah Edifice, Yatamadji was re-appointed manager of Chad.
