= Natoltiga Okalah =

Chadian professional football manager

Personal information
- Place of birth: Chad

Managerial career
- Years: Team
- 2006–2007: Chad
- 2008: Chad

Natoltiga Okalah is a Chadian professional football manager.

== Career ==
Since 2006 until 2007 and 2008 he coached the Chad national football team.
