= Dominique Teinkor =

Chadian footballer (born 1984)

Personal information
- Date of birth: May 15, 1984 (age 42)
- Place of birth: N'Djamena, Chad
- Height: 1.90 m (6 ft 3 in)
- Position: Goalkeeper

Senior career*
Years	Team	Apps	(Gls)
1997-2004	Union Douala		(-)
2005-2013	AS DGSSIE		(-)

International career
1998-2012	Chad national football team	7	(-)
- * Club domestic league appearances and goals

Dominique Teinkor (born May 15, 1984) is a retired Chadian football goalkeeper.

== International career ==
He was goalkeeper of Chad national football team. He was a part of qualifying campaign for 2002 World Cup, as well as 2012 Africa Cup of Nations. He collected 7 caps for national team.

== Club career ==
He finished his career in AS DGSSIE.
