= Brice Mabaya =

Chadian footballer (born 1986)

Personal information
- Full name: Brice Mabaya
- Date of birth: 19 April 1986 (age 40)

International career^{‡}
Years	Team	Apps	(Gls)
2011–2014	Chad	6	(0)
- ‡ National team caps and goals as of 3 July 2014

Brice Mabaya (born 19 April 1986) is a Chadian professional football player. He has made six appearances for the Chad national football team.

== See also ==
- List of Chad international footballers
