= Ahmat Brahim =

Chadian footballer (born 1982)

Personal information
- Date of birth: 8 December 1982 (age 43)
- Place of birth: Chad
- Height: 1.81 m (5 ft 11 in)
- Position: Midfielder

Senior career*
Years	Team	Apps	(Gls)
1997–2013	Renaissance FC		
2013–2014	Elect-Sport FC		

International career^{‡}
1999–2008	Chad	22	(2)
- * Club domestic league appearances and goals as of 29 October 2020 ‡ National team caps and goals as of 29 October 2020

Ahmat Brahim (born 8 December 1982) was a Chadian football midfielder. He last played for Elect-Sport FC.

== Career ==
He played most of his career for Chadian club Renaissance FC. He finished his career in Elect-Sport FC.

=== International goals ===
Scores and results list Chad's goal tally first.

Goal	Date	Venue	Opponent	Score	Result	Competition
1.	22 February 2007	Stade de l'Amitié, Cotonou, Benin	Benin	1–0	1–0	Friendly
2.	6 March 2007	Stade Omnisports Idriss Mahamat Ouya, N'Djamena, Chad	Central African Republic	3–2	3–2	Friendly

== See also ==
- List of Chad international footballers
