= Moumine Kassouré Ekiang =

Chadian footballer (born 1989)

Personal information
- Full name: Moumine Kassouré Ekiang
- Date of birth: 23 March 1989 (age 37)
- Place of birth: Massenya, Chad
- Position: Goalkeeper

International career^{‡}
Years	Team	Apps	(Gls)
2012	Chad	1	(0)
- ‡ National team caps and goals as of 2 July 2014

Moumine Kassouré Ekiang (born 23 March 1989) is a Chadian professional football goalkeeper. He has made one appearance for the Chad national football team.

== See also ==
- List of Chad international footballers
