= César Abaya =

Chadian footballer (born 1984)

Personal information
- Date of birth: 12 October 1984 (age 42)
- Place of birth: N'Djamena, Chad
- Height: 1.80 m (5 ft 11 in)
- Positions: Full-back; centre-back

Team information
- Current team: AS SONIDEP

Senior career*
Years	Team	Apps	(Gls)
2002–2013	Renaissance		
2014	Gazelle		
2015-2016	Foullah		
2016-2018	Mangasport		
2018–	AS SONIDEP		

International career^{‡}
2011–2019	Chad	14	(0)
- * Club domestic league appearances and goals as of 24 September 2019 ‡ National team caps and goals as of 18 November 2019

César Abaya (born 12 October 1984) is a Chadian professional football player who plays for a club AS SONIDEP and the Chad national team.

== Career ==
Abaya plays the right-back position. He can, however, play left-back and centre-back positions. Before joining AS SONIDEP in 2018, he played for Renaissance, Gazelle, Foullah and Mangasport.

== International career ==
Abaya has 14 FIFA official matches, and 9 unofficial matches for Chad.

== See also ==
- List of Chad international footballers
