= Yann Djim Ngarlendana =

Chadian professional football manager

Yann Djim
Personal information
- Full name: Yann Djim Ngarlendana
- Place of birth: Chad

Managerial career
- Years: Team
- 2003: Chad
- 2005: Chad
- 2006: Chad

Yann Djim Ngarlendana is a Chadian professional football manager.

== Career ==
In 2003, 2005 and 2006 he coached the Chad national football team.
