= Jules Hamidou =

Chadian footballer (born 1987)

Personal information
- Date of birth: 28 August 1987 (age 39)
- Place of birth: Delémont, Switzerland
- Height: 1.90 m (6 ft 3 in)
- Position: Centre-back

Team information
- Current team: Delémont
- Number: 12

Senior career*
Years	Team	Apps	(Gls)
2007–2008	Laufen	12	(2)
2008–2012	Delémont	82	(4)
2012–2013	Biel-Bienne	5	(0)
2013–	Delémont	25	(1)

International career^{‡}
2008–	Chad	4	(0)
- * Club domestic league appearances and goals as of 1 September 2015 ‡ National team caps and goals as of 1 September 2015

Jules Hamidou (born 8 August 1987) is a professional footballer who currently plays as a defender for Delémont. Born in Switzerland, he represented Chad at international level.

== Career ==
Hamidou plays for Delémont in Switzerland. He played for Laufen and Biel-Bienne, too.

== International career ==
He is a member of the Chad national football team, where he plays the centre-position. He made a national team debut in 2008 when he came in as a substitute in World Cup qualifying match against Mali, on 11 October 2008. He was called in 2010 too, but the injury prevented him from playing. In 2011, he made his second appearance against Malawi. The match ended 2-2 and disabled Malawi to qualify to 2012 African Cup of Nations. His third match was against Malawi again, he played in a 2–0 defeat in 2013 African Nations Cup qualifiers.

== See also ==
- List of Chad international footballers
