= Nouh Doungous Mahamat =

Chadian footballer (born 1982)

Personal information
- Full name: Nouh Doungous Mahamat
- Date of birth: 20 March 1982 (age 44)

International career^{‡}
| Years | Team | Apps | (Gls) |
| 2007 | Chad | 1 | (0) |
- ‡ National team caps and goals as of 5 July 2014

Nouh Doungous Mahamat (born 20 March 1982) is a former Chadian professional football player. He made one appearance for the Chad national football team.

== See also ==
- List of Chad international footballers
