= Mahamat Adoum =

Chadian footballer (died 2021)

Mahmat Adoum
Personal information
- Date of birth: 1957 or 1958
- Date of death: 18 December 2021 (aged 63)
- Place of death: N'Djamena, Chad
- Position: Right winger

Senior career*
Years	Team	Apps	(Gls)
- Gazelle FC

International career
1999	Chad	1	(0)
- * Club domestic league appearances and goals

Mahmat Adoum (1957/1958–18 December 2021) was a Chadian professional footballer who played as a right winger for Gazelle FC. He made one appearance for the Chad national team in 1999.

Later in his life, Adoum became the director of his former club Gazelle FC. He also worked as a member of the N'Djamena football league and the Chadian Football Federation. Adoum, nicknamed "Vava", died on 18 December 2021, at the age of 63 in N'Djamena. In January 2023, a ceremony was held in his honour.

== See also ==
- List of Chad international footballers
