= List of Chad international footballers =

Footballers of Chad

This is the list of players that have played for the Chad national football team.

Player
Abanga Abakar
Mahamat Issa Abakar
Oumar Abakar
Hisseine Abana
César Abaya
Maigué Abbas
Aboubakar Abdel-Aziz
Djidéo Abdoulaye
Hassan Abdoulaye
Sidick Aboubakar
Abakar Adoum
Mahmat Adoum
Adji Ahmat
Mahamat Alhadj
Mondésir Alladjim
Sitamadji Allarassem
Massama Asselmo
Karl Max Barthélémy
Francis Oumar Belonga
Misdongarde Betolngar
Morgan Betorangal
Mamadou Bouba
Ahmat Brahim
Hassane Brahim
Kossadehil Danaye
Syriakata Hassan Diallo
Mbairamadji Dillah
Anatole Djekruassem
Hamtouin Djenet
Armand Djérabé
Hisseine Djiddo
Esaïe Djikoloum
Henri Djikoloum
Noumasseri Djimadoum
Evariste Djimasdé
Léger Djimrangar
Appolinaire Djingabeye
Djimalde Dossengar
Gaius Doumde
Herman Doumnan
Jacques Dourwe
Moumine Kassouré Ekiang
Ferdinand Gassina
Jules Hamidou
Nadjim Haroun
Hassan Hissein
Mahamat Hissein
Ali Hisseine
Sylvain Idangar
Olivier Kalwaye
Hilaire Kédigui
Yaya Kerim
Outhman Khatir
Armel Koulara
Mbanguingar Krabe
Mahamat Ahmat Labbo
Pierre Daldoumbe Lama
Robert Lokossimbayé
Brice Mabaya
Madawa Macrada
César Madalngué
Yves Madjilom
Constant Madtoingué
Azrack Mahamat
Nouh Doungous Mahamat
Tigaye Masrabaye
Didier Timothée Mbai
Marius Mbaiam
Allamadji Mbaiguesse
David Mbaihouloum
Robert Mbainayal
Diondja Jules Mbairemadji
Ahmed Evariste Medego
Gaston Mobati
Marius Mouandilmadji
Ndakom Valéry Ndeidoum
Galoum Ndilagar
Laolindeumaye N'Dolak
Blaise Ndolar
Kalwaye Ndoninga
Ezechiel Ndouassel
Sylvain Ndoubam
Ndilgar Ngalloum
Religues Ngueadi
Cyprien Nguembaye
Kévin Nicaise
Rodrigue Ninga
Djangtoloum Ottobaye
Habib Mahamat Saleh
Mahamut Idriss Seid
Yallo Tahou
Dominique Teinkor
Acyl Abdraman Ousman
Rufin Yambe
