= Njimom =

Coordinates: 5°51′N 10°57′E

- Commune and town
- Interactive map of Njimom
- Country: Cameroon
- Time zone: UTC+1 (WAT)

Njimom is a town and commune in Cameroon.

== See also ==
- Communes of Cameroon
- Noun (department)
