= Dadji Rahamata Ahmat Mahamat =

Chadian feminist activist

Dadji Rahamata Ahmat Mahamat is a Chadian feminist activist. She is the office manager of CAMOJET, the Collectif des Associations et Mouvements de Jeunes du Tchad (Collective of Young People's Movements and Associations in Chad).

== Early life ==
She is the daughter of Ahmat Dadji, the former CEO of the Chadian Industrial Sugar Company (SONASUT), and the leader of the Hadjeraï people.

She has not seen her father since was two-years-old. On 28 May 1987, her father and her two older brothers, aged 20 and 17, were arrested, by men allegedly sent by the President of Chad, Hissène Habré.

Ever since, she and her family have campaigned to find out what happened to her father, and this has drawn her into activism more generally.

== Career ==
She has worked for various organisations and associations in Chad, and joined CAMOJET in 2010.

She is the conseillère du bureau (office manager) for the Collectif des Associations et Mouvements de Jeunes du Tchad (Collective of Young People's Movements and Associations in Chad), CAMOJET, a " youth association working for human rights", based in the country's capital city, N'Djamena.

On 6 February 2015, Dadji was arrested, but released later that day on the condition that she does not speak to the press about her arrest. She immediately spoke out, and was arrested again, and released with 22 other protesters without charge on 8 February, and ordered not to speak again to the media, unless she wanted to "ruin her life".

Dadji has said, "I have been harassed, intimidated and threatened but I will stand firm."

== Personal life ==
Dadji lives in the capital city of Chad, N'Djamena.
