= Herman Doumnan =

Chadian footballer (born 1982)

Personal information
- Full name: Herman Doumnan
- Date of birth: 25 September 1982 (age 44)
- Position: Defensive midfielder

Team information
- Current team: Soudan fc

Senior career*
Years	Team	Apps	(Gls)
- Gazelle

International career^{‡}
2010–	Chad	9	(0)
- * Club domestic league appearances and goals ‡ National team caps and goals as of 7 September 2015

Herman Doumnan (born 25 September 1982) is a Chadian professional football player. He has made nine appearances for the Chad national football team.

== See also ==
- List of Chad international footballers
