= Constant Madtoingué =

Chadian footballer (born 1994)

Personal information
- Full name: Constant Madtoingué
- Date of birth: 23 September 1987 (age 39)
- Place of birth: Sarh, Chad
- Height: 1.80 m (5 ft 11 in)
- Position: Right back

Team information
- Current team: AS CotonTchad

Senior career*
Years	Team	Apps	(Gls)
2010–2016	AS CotonTchad		
2017–2018	Union Douala		
2018–	AS CotonTchad		

International career^{‡}
2011–	Chad	26	(0)
- * Club domestic league appearances and goals as of 8 October 2020 ‡ National team caps and goals as of 8 October 2020

Constant Madtoingué (born 23 September 1994) is a Chadian football defender and the member of Chad national football team. He has 17 FIFA official caps for national team, and he took part to the qualifying campaign for 2021 Africa Cup of Nations.

== International career ==
Constant debuted in a friendly match against Equatorial Guinea in February 2011. Soon after that, he played a 2012 Africa Cup of Nations qualification match against Botswana, which Chad lost 0-1 in N'Djamena. He was part of the team that won CEMAC 2014. He has 9 unofficial caps for Chad as well.

== See also ==
- List of Chad international footballers
