= Mathieu Adoassou =

Chadian footballer (born 1993)

Personal information
- Full name: Eli Mathieu Tchaoussou Adoassou
- Date of birth: 11 November 1993 (age 32)
- Place of birth: N'Djamena, Chad
- Position: Goalkeeper

Team information
- Current team: Renaissance FC

Senior career*
| Years | Team | Apps | (Gls) |
| 2015 | Foullah Edifice | | |
| 2016–2018 | Renaissance FC | | |
| 2019 | AS CotonTchad | | |
| 2020– | Renaissance FC | | |

International career^{‡}
| 2016– | Chad | 10 | (0) |
- * Club domestic league appearances and goals ‡ National team caps and goals as of 00:16, 20 January 2025 (UTC)

Eli Mathieu Tchaoussou Adoassou (Arabic: ماثيو أدواسو; born 11 November 1993), known as Mathieu Adoassou, is a Chadian professional footballer who plays as a goalkeeper for Chad Premier League club Renaissance FC and the Chad national team.
