= Maigué Abbas =

Chadian footballer (born 1989)

Personal information
- Full name: Maigué Abbas
- Date of birth: 24 July 1989 (age 37)
- Place of birth: N'Djamena, Chad
- Height: 1.82 m (6 ft 0 in)
- Position: Centre-back

Team information
- Current team: Gazelle

Senior career*
Years	Team	Apps	(Gls)
2006–2007	Renaissance		
2007–2009	Elect-Sport		
2009–2011	Gazelle		
2011–2012	Elect-Sport		
2013–	Gazelle		

International career^{‡}
2010–	Chad	4	(0)
- * Club domestic league appearances and goals ‡ National team caps and goals as of 1 September 2015

Maigué Abbas (born 24 July 1989) is a Chadian football defender, who plays for Chadian side Gazelle.

== Career ==
Maigué Abbas started his career in Renaissance. After RFC, he played for Elect-Sport. Maigue played for Elect in two occasions: first time from 2007 to 2009 and the second time in 2011 and 2012. After Elect, he played for Gazelle.

== International career ==
Maigue is a member of Chad national football team where he plays centre-back position. He has 4 caps for national team so far and was a part of qualifying campaign for 2012 Africa Cup of Nations. He made a debut in a match against Tunisia on 11 August 2010.

== See also ==
- List of Chad international footballers
