= Baron Kibamba =

Congolese footballer

Personal information
- Full name: Francoeur Baron De Sylvain Kibamba
- Date of birth: 23 March 1998 (age 28)
- Place of birth: Dolisie, Congo
- Height: 1.84 m (6 ft 0 in)
- Position: Defender

Team information
- Current team: Manchester 62
- Number: 4

Senior career*
Years	Team	Apps	(Gls)
2016–2017	CARA Brazzaville		
2018	AS Otôho		
2018–2019	Linense	23	(1)
2019–2022	Sevilla B	52	(2)
2022–2023	Othellos Athienou	21	(2)
2024–	Manchester 62	20	(1)

International career^{‡}
2017–2021	Congo	13	(0)
- * Club domestic league appearances and goals as of 26 April 2025 ‡ National team caps and goals as of 7 September 2021

Francoeur Baron De Sylvain Kibamba (born 23 March 1998) is a Congolese professional footballer who plays for Gibraltar Football League club Manchester 62 as a defender.

== Club career ==
Born in Dolisie, he has played club football for CARA Brazzaville, AS Otôho and Linense.

On 25 June 2019, Kibamba signed for Sevilla FC and was assigned to the reserves.

He signed for Othellos Athienou for the 2022–23 season. In July 2024, he moved to Gibraltar to sign for Manchester 62, just over the border from his former club Linense.

== International career ==
Kibamba made his international debut for Congo against Senegal in 2017.
