= Malentouen =

Coordinates: 5.8000°N 11.0000°E

- Commune and town
- Interactive map of Malentouen
- Country: Cameroon
- Time zone: UTC+1 (WAT)

Malentouen is a town and commune in Cameroon.

== See also ==
- Communes of Cameroon
