= Ricardo Cardoso (footballer) =

Santomean footballer

Personal information
- Full name: Ricardo Gué Rosa Cardoso
- Date of birth: 23 September 2001 (age 25)
- Place of birth: Barreiro, Setúbal, Portugal
- Height: 1.71 m (5 ft 7 in)
- Position: Winger

Team information
- Current team: Affrico

Youth career
- 2009–2011: Amora
- 2011–2015: Sporting CP
- 2015–2019: Belenenses
- 2018: → Benfica (loan)
- 2019–2020: Tondela

Senior career*
Years	Team	Apps	(Gls)
2021	Belenenses II	12	(1)
2021	KajHa	8	(12)
2022–2023	Klubi 04	23	(5)
2023	Skellefteå	20	(13)
2024–2025	KPV	48	(24)
2025–2026	Terranuova Traiana	5	(1)
2026–	Affrico		

International career^{‡}
2021–	São Tomé and Príncipe	11	(2)
- * Club domestic league appearances and goals as of 18 January 2026 ‡ National team caps and goals as of 13 October 2025

Ricardo Gué Rosa Cardoso (born 23 September 2001) is a footballer who plays as a winger for Italian Eccellenza club Affrico. Born in Portugal, he plays for the São Tomé and Príncipe national team.

== International career ==
Cardoso made his professional debut with the São Tomé and Príncipe national team in a 2–0 2021 Africa Cup of Nations qualification loss to Sudan on 24 March 2021.

=== International goals ===
updated 23 August 2023

Scores and results list Sao Tome and Principe's goal tally first.

No.	Date	Venue	Opponent	Score	Result	Competition
1.	27 March 2022	Stade de Cote d'Or, Saint Pierre, Mauritius	Mauritius	1–1	3–3	2023 Africa Cup of Nations qualification
2.	27 March 2022	Stade de Cote d'Or, Saint Pierre, Mauritius	Mauritius	2–2	3–3	2023 Africa Cup of Nations qualification

== Honours ==
KPV

- Ykkönen runner-up: 2024

Individual

- Ykkönen Player of the Year: 2024
- Ykkönen Forward of the Year: 2024
