= Hilaire Kédigui =

Chadian footballer (born 1982)

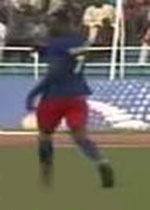

Personal information
- Full name: Hilaire Kédigui
- Date of birth: 19 September 1982 (age 44)
- Place of birth: N'Djamena, Chad
- Height: 1.80 m (5 ft 11 in)
- Positions: Central midfielder; left midfielder; centre-forward

Youth career
- Tourbillon FC

Senior career*
Years	Team	Apps	(Gls)
2003–2008	Tourbillon FC	37	(22)
2009–2010	AS Mangasport	13	(2)
2010–2011	US Bitam		
2011–2014	Gazelle FC		
2015–2016	Foullah Edifice FC		

International career^{‡}
2006–2015	Chad	23	(4)
- * Club domestic league appearances and goals as of 7 July 2017 ‡ National team caps and goals as of 7 July 2017

Hilaire Kédigui (born 19 September 1982 ) is a retired Chadian football player. His last club was Chadian Foullah Edifice FC.

== Career ==
Kédigui began his career with Tourbillon FC before signing in summer 2009 for AS Mangasport. From 2011 until 2014 he played for Gazelle FC. He finished his career in Foullah Edifice FC. He could play all the positions in midfield and attack, but usually played left midfield position or left central/defensive midfielder. He is left-footed.

== International career ==
He played for the Chad national football team in 2010 World Cup qualifiers and was part of the team that played African Nations Cup 2012 and 2017 qualifiers.

== International goals ==
#	Date	Venue	Opponent	Score	Final score	Competition
1	11 March 2007	N'Djamena	Gabon	1-2	1-2	2007 CEMAC Cup
2	16 June 2007	Chililabombwe	Zambia	1-0	1-1	2008 Africa Cup of Nations qualification
3	7 June 2008	N'Djamena	Mali	1-2	1-2	2010 World Cup qualification
4	14 June 2008	N'Djamena	Congo	1-1	2-1	2010 World Cup qualification

== See also ==
- List of Chad international footballers
