= Emmanuel Trégoat =

French professional football manager (born 1962)

Personal information
- Date of birth: 26 September 1962 (age 64)
- Place of birth: France

Managerial career
- Years: Team
- 2005–2007: SU Dives B
- 2007–2011: AS Trouville-Deauville (sporting director)
- 2011–2012: Red Star (assistant)
- 2012–2013: Racing Colombes (youth)
- 2013–2014: Paris FC II
- 2014–2015: Chad
- 2016–2017: AS Saint-Ouen-l'Aumône
- 2017: Wasquehal
- 2019: Racing Colombes
- 2019–2020: Chad

Emmanuel Trégoat (born 26 September 1962) is a French professional football manager.

From July 2013 to June 2014 he was a coach of the Paris FC II. He coached the Chad national football team from 2014 to 2015, and then again from 2019 to 2020.
