= Ahmat Abderamane =

Chadian footballer (born 1993)

Personal information
- Date of birth: 1 January 1993 (age 33)
- Place of birth: Moundou, Chad
- Position: Centre-back

Team information
- Current team: Renaissance FC

Senior career*
Years	Team	Apps	(Gls)
2012–2013	ASLAD		
2014–2017	Renaissance FC		
2018–2019	AS CotonTchad		
2019–	Renaissance FC		

International career^{‡}
2019–	Chad	9	(2)
- * Club domestic league appearances and goals ‡ National team caps and goals as of 00:51, 23 April 2022 (UTC)

Ahmat Abderamane (Arabic: أحمد عبد الرحمن; born 1 January 1993) is a Chadian professional footballer who plays as a centre-back for Chad Premier League club Renaissance FC and the Chad national team.

== International career ==
Abderamane is a Chad international. He made his debut for the Chad national team in a 3–3 draw against Equatorial Guinea on 28 July 2019. His first goal came in a 1–1 draw against Guinea on 15 November 2020. On 29 March 2022, Abderamane scored in a 2–2 draw against the Gambia.
