= Foullah Edifice FC =

Chadian football club

- Full name: Foullah Edifice Football Club
- Founded: 2007; 19 years ago
- Ground: Stade Omnisports Idriss Mahamat Ouya; N'Djamena, Chad
- Capacity: 20,000
- Chairman: Djibril Abba Ngamdé
- Manager: Oumar Bakari Mbang
- League: Chad Premier League
- 2025–26: Champions
Home colours	Away colours

Foullah Edifice Football Club is a football club based in N'Djamena, Chad. They had a few Chadian national team players, like Mbaya Brice, Massama Asselmo, Ferdinand Gassina and Hassan Hissein.

The club's colours are sky blue and white.

== History ==
Foullah Edifice won the national championship in 2011, 2013 and 2014. In 2011, they played in a Cup and Supercup final, which they lost to RFC. They also have one cup title from 2014 and one Cup de Ligue title from 2010. In 2015 the club finished in 4th position in first division. At the end of 2016, the club transferred its player Esaie Mayakamon Allafi to Cameroonian side Coton Sport Garoua.

== Crest ==
Old logo

== Stadium ==
Stade Omnisports Idriss Mahamat Ouya, also named Stade Nacional, is a multi-purpose stadium located in N'Djamena, Chad. It is currently used mostly for football matches. The stadium holds 20,000 people. It is currently the home ground of the Chad national football team. It is named after former Chadian highjumper Mahamat Idriss (1942–1987).

== Achievements ==
Chad Premier League:

- Champions (4): 2011, 2013, 2014, 2026

Chad Cup: 1

- Winners: 2014.

Coupe de Ligue de N'Djaména: 1

- Winners: 2010.

Chad Super Cup: 0

== Performance in CAF competitions ==
- CAF Champions League: 1 appearance

2012 – Preliminary Round

- CAF Confederation Cup: 1 appearance

2011 – First Round

== Current squad ==
Note: Flags indicate national team as defined under FIFA eligibility rules; some limited exceptions apply. Players may hold more than one non-FIFA nationality.

No.	Pos.	Nation	Player
1	GK	CHA	Ado Tchaoussou Mathieu
16	GK	CTA	Alladoum Kolimba
2	DF	CHA	Issa Abakar
4	DF	CHA	Mahamat Lossou
23	DF	CHA	Djibrine Bokit
24	DF	CHA	Oumar Droye
3	MF	CHA	Malloum Bousseina
6	MF	CHA	Natar Aldongar
8	MF	CHA	Hassan Diallo
12	MF	CHA	Ndjedouboum Nadjibang
13	MF	CHA	Alexandre Ngetobaye

No.	Pos.	Nation	Player
15	MF	CHA	Djembayel Edouard
17	MF	CMR	Stephane Tchoumi
18	MF	CHA	Matibeye Ngarbe Francklin
19	MF	CHA	Mahamat Abakar
26	MF	CHA	Ahmat Abiat
27	MF	CHA	Arthur Koro Dingamnai
30	MF	CHA	Ndiganbeye Appolinaire
7	FW	CHA	Hassane Minandi
28	FW	CHA	Mahamat Ekian
29	FW	CMR	Nkondje Jaspar Ekamba

== Managers ==
- 2010, 2011 – (Chad) Emmanuel Boukar
- 2015 – (Chad) Djindo Manadji Samuel
