= Chad national football team =

Men's association football team

Chad
- Nickname: Les Sao
- Association: Fédération Tchadienne de Football Association (FTFA)
- Confederation: CAF (Africa)
- Sub-confederation: UNIFFAC (Central Africa)
- Head coach: Raoul Savoy
- Captain: Casimir Ninga
- Most caps: Ezechiel N'Douassel (51)
- Top scorer: Ezechiel N'Douassel (14)
- Home stadium: Stade Olympique Maréchal Idriss Déby Itno
- FIFA code: CHA
| First colours | Second colours |

FIFA ranking
- Current: 181 ▲2 (7 October 2026)
- Highest: 97 (April 2016)
- Lowest: 190 (June–September 1997)

First international
- Chad 2–2 Niger (Abidjan, Ivory Coast; 25 December 1961)

Biggest win
- Chad 5–0 São Tomé and Príncipe (Libreville, Gabon; June 29, 1976); Chad 5–0 São Tomé and Príncipe (Libreville, Gabon; 10 November 1999)

Biggest defeat
- Congo 11–0 Chad (Congo; 28 March 1964)

The Chad national football team (Arabic: منتخب تشاد لكرة القدم, French: Équipe du Tchad de football), nicknamed Les Sao (Arabic: ساو), represents Chad in international football and is controlled by the Chadian Football Federation, the governing body for football in the country. The team has never qualified for the World Cup finals or Africa Cup of Nations. Home matches are played at the Maréchal Idriss Déby Itno Olympic Stadium. In April 2021, FIFA banned the Chad national football team from participating in global football over the Chadian government's interference with the Chadian Football Federation. However, the ban has since been rescinded.

== History ==
The Chadian Football Federation was founded in 1962 and became affiliated to FIFA and CAF in 1988.

Chad's national football team did not play a big role in world football until the 1990s. They did not enter any qualifiers for Continental or World Cups until the early 1990s when they played their first qualifying matches for the 1992 Africa Cup of Nations, hosted by Senegal. Until then, they played mostly friendly matches and minor cups, mostly with African teams.

The national team had a difficult start − the first match they ever played was in the L'Amitié Tournament, which took place in Senegal in 1963, and it was a 2–1 defeat to Liberia. Soon after, they suffered a 6–2 loss to Dahomey (now Benin).

The Chad national football team never qualified for either the Africa Cup of Nations or the World Cup. Their first participation in the World Cup qualifiers was in 2000 when they were eliminated in the first round by Liberia, losing 0–1 at home, and playing 0–0 away. They were coached by Marcel Mao. Their next attempt was in 2003, under Yann Djim, but they were eliminated by Angola. They won their first home game when Francis Oumar Belonga scored a hat trick, 3–1. They lost their away match 2–0, and went no further. The qualifiers for the 2010 World Cup brought more matches because they played in a group phase together with Mali, Sudan and Congo. They finished at the bottom of the group, with six points (two wins and four losses).

In the qualifying competition for the 2014 World Cup, Chad faced Tanzania in a first-round playoff. Tanzania advanced despite shockingly losing 1–0 at home at Dar es Salaam's National Stadium. The Taifa Stars were tipped for an emphatic victory over the visitors, having won the first-leg 2–1 in N'Djamena. Chad stunned the home side three minutes after the break when Mahamat Ahmat Labo struck to silence the home crowd. But Tanzania managed to progress to the next round thanks to the away goals rule as they were tied 2–2 on aggregate.

Chad played against Malawi in the qualifiers for the 2013 Africa Cup of Nations. Chad won the first leg match 3–2, but lost 2–0 in Blantyre to be eliminated with an aggregate score of 4–3.

In the qualifiers for the 2015 Africa Cup of Nations, Malawi was the opponent once again. Chad lost 2–0 in the first leg at Kamuzu Stadium in Blantyre, but they won 3–1 in at Idriss Mahamat Ouya Stadium in N'Djamena, losing on the away goals rule. Forward Robin Ngalande turned into a savior for Malawi when he came off the bench to score a crucial late goal.

The biggest achievement for Chad so far is a CEMAC Cup (Economic and Monetary Community of Central Africa) title in 2014, after beating Congo 3–2 in the final on December 14 in Bata, Equatorial Guinea. French-born Emmanuel Trégoat managed the team. Their previous best was a second place in the 2005 edition, when they lost to Cameroon in the final.

Les Sao had a disappointing start into their qualifying campaign for the 2017 Africa Cup of Nations, losing 2–0 to Nigeria and slumping to a 5–1 defeat at home against Egypt. But it was then that things took a turn for the better, as coach Moudou Kouta, who was in charge of the side on an interim basis, took the team to an unexpected victory against Sierra Leone in the first round of the qualifiers for the 2018 World Cup. Les Sao won 1–0 at home and even though they were beaten 2–1 in the return leg, they advanced to the second round of the qualifiers on away goals. Chad sensationally defeated Egypt 1–0 at home in the second round before falling to a 4–0 defeat in Alexandria three days later.

In March 2016, the Chadian Football Federation announced they were withdrawing from the 2017 Africa Cup of Nations qualification due to financial problems. The team was subsequently banned from entering the following edition, meaning they would play no official games for over three years until September 2019, when Chad lost 1–3 at home to Sudan in 2022 FIFA World Cup qualification. A month later Les Sao defeated Liberia on penalties to reach the Group Stage of 2021 Africa Cup of Nations qualification.

In March 2021, the Chadian government dissolved the Chadian Football Federation, leaving Chad facing a likely ban under FIFA regulations that prevent governments from interfering in the running of a country's football team. In April 2021, FIFA announced an indefinite ban from global football, citing the Chadian government's interference. Due to this decision, CAF disqualified Chad from its participation in the 2021 AFCON qualifiers.

== Kits ==
| Kit provider | Period |
|---|---|
| (Chad) Salamant | 1974–1979 |
| (England) Mitre | 1980–1992 |
| (Italy) Fila | 1993–2000 |
| (Germany) Adidas | 2001–2020 |
| (France) Kipsta | 2020–2021 |
| (China) Anta | 2021–2022 |
| (Italy) Macron | 2022–2024 |
| (Germany) Puma | 2024 |
| (Switzerland) 14Fourteen | 2025 |
| (Chad) YouyaPro | 2025 |

During the independence of Chad, the team competed in international matches and played in a blue shirt, blue shorts, and red socks. These are the national colours of the French flag. In the 1970s, Chad's home colors changed to blue-yellow-red. Their first away kit in 1960 was white shirt, red shorts, and white socks. In 1980, the away kit color changed into red shirt, blue shorts, and yellow socks.

== Results and fixtures ==
The following is a list of match results in the last 12 months, as well as any future matches that have been scheduled.

Win Draw Loss Fixture

=== 2025 ===
| 14 November Friendly | Uganda | 2–1 | Chad | Berrechid, Morocco |
| | Mubiru 20' (pen.); Lorenzen 46' | Report | H. Tchaouna 64' (pen.) | Stadium: Stade Municipal De Berrechid |

| 17 November Friendly | Chad | 2–2 | Mozambique | Berrechid, Morocco |
| 16:00 UTC+1 | Mouandilmadji 45+2'; M. Thiam 90+1' (pen.) | Report | Catamo 79' (pen.); Gildo 90+6' | Stadium: Stade Municipal De Berrechid |

=== 2026 ===
| 27 March 2027 AFCON qualification | Chad | 0–4 | Burundi | N'Djamena, Chad |
| 14:00 UTC+1 | | Report | Liongola 6'; Kanakimana 32'; Mpawenimana 63'; Girumugisha 74' | Stadium: Stade Olympique Maréchal Idriss Déby Itno; Referee: Ailton Carmelino (Angola) |

| 31 March 2027 AFCON qualification | Burundi | 4–0 | Chad | Bujumbura, Burundi |
| 15:00 UTC+2 | Kanakimana 14', 22'; Girumugisha 71'; Mpawenimana 80' | Report | | Stadium: Intwari Stadium; Referee: Jalal Jayed (Morocco) |

== Current staff ==
| Position | Name |
|---|---|
| Head coach | (Switzerland) Raoul Savoy |
| Assistant coaches | (Chad) Djaïd Soubirou (Chad) Mahamat Tchamade |
| Goalkeeping coach | (Chad) Idriss Ngaroua |
| Match analyst | (Chad) Souleyman Djaffar |
| Fitness coach | (Chad) Ahmadou Nagoum |
| Doctor | (Chad) Dr. Abakar Djiourou |
| Physiotherapists | (Chad) Boubakar Hassane (Chad) Yaya Tchadé (Chad) Bakari Akou (Chad) Issa Ngari |
| Team coordinator | (Chad) Kader Sougou |
| Technical director | (Chad) Moudou Kouta |

=== Coaching history ===
- (Soviet Union) Vasily Sokolov (1967–1971)
- (Soviet Union) Anzor Kavazashvili (1976–1977)
- (Chad) Yakia Aoudou (1985)
- (Chad) Moussarou Ngongolo (1998)
- (Chad) Yann Djim Ngarlendana (1998)
- (Chad) Douba Djibrine (1999)
- (France) Marcel Mao (2000)
- (Cameroon) Jean Paul Akono (2002–2003)
- (Chad) Yann Djim Ngarlendana (2003)
- (Chad) Yann Djim Ngarlendana (2005–2006)
- (Chad) Moudou Kouta (2006)
- (Chad) Natoltiga Okalah (2006–2007)
- (Chad) Mahamat Adoum (2007)
- (Chad) Natoltiga Okalah (2008)
- (Egypt) Sherif El-Khashab (2009–2011)
- (Chad) Moudou Kouta (2011–2013)
- (France) Emmanuel Trégoat (2014–2015)
- (Cameroon) Rigobert Song (2015)
- (Chad) Moudou Kouta (2015–2016)
- (Chad) Djimtan Yatamadji (2019)
- (France) Emmanuel Trégoat (2019–2020)
- (Chad) Djimtan Yatamadji (2020–2023)
- (Chad) Kévin Nicaise (2023–2025)
- (Chad) Tahir Gardia (2025–present)

== Players ==
=== Current squad ===
The following players have been called up for the 2026 FIFA World Cup qualification – CAF Group I matches against Mali and Central African Republic on 8 and 12 October 2025; respectively.

Caps and goals current as of 8 October 2025, after the match against Mali.

| No. | Pos. | Player | Date of birth (age) | Caps | Goals | Club |
|---|---|---|---|---|---|---|
| 1 | GK | Mathieu Adoassou | 11 November 1993 (age 33) | 0 | 0 | (Chadian Football Federation) Renaissance |
| 16 | GK | Mbaiossoum Samba Diallo | 12 April 2002 (age 24) | 0 | 0 | (Equatoguinean Football Federation) 15 de Agosto |
| 22 | GK | Jourdain Mbaynaïssem | 15 February 1994 (age 32) | 7 | 0 | (South African Football Association) Venda |
| 3 | DF | Dia Wah Michael | 7 February 2000 (age 26) | 3 | 0 | (Sudan Football Association) Al Merrikh |
| 4 | DF | Félix Noubara | 11 December 2005 (age 20) | 4 | 0 | (Chadian Football Federation) AS PSI N'Djamena |
| 8 | DF | Charles Tchouplaou | 30 January 2001 (age 25) | 13 | 1 | (South African Football Association) Casric Stars |
| 13 | DF | Natoyoum Osee | 18 December 1995 (age 30) | 6 | 0 | (Chadian Football Federation) AS Coton |
| 15 | DF | Wanre Daikreo | 3 July 2000 (age 26) | 4 | 0 | (Cameroonian Football Federation) Gazelle FA de Garoua |
| 21 | DF | Gabkala Daba | 1 February 2004 (age 22) | 3 | 0 | (Chadian Football Federation) AS PSI N'Djamena |
| 5 | MF | Djawal Kaiba | 8 February 2003 (age 23) | 0 | 0 | (Swiss Football Association) Wil |
| 6 | MF | Mahamat Thiam | 15 September 2001 (age 25) | 16 | 1 | (Tunisian Football Federation) Stade Tunisien |
| 12 | MF | Lassine Kouma | 19 May 2004 (age 22) | 1 | 0 | (Tanzania Football Federation) Young Africans |
| 17 | MF | Yves Allarabaye | 7 September 2003 (age 23) | 18 | 1 | (Chadian Football Federation) Foullah Edifice |
| 18 | MF | William Damba | 20 October 2003 (age 23) | 10 | 0 | (Burkinabé Football Federation) RC Kadiogo |
| 20 | MF | Benjamin Merba | 18 November 2005 (age 20) | 5 | 0 | (Chadian Football Federation) Foullah Edifice |
| 23 | MF | Franck Tchaouna | 19 September 2005 (age 21) | 3 | 0 | (Italian Football Federation) Catanzaro |
| 2 | FW | Abdoul Aziz | 5 June 2005 (age 21) | 2 | 0 | (Egyptian Football Association) Qanah |
| 7 | FW | Haroun Tchaouna | 14 April 2000 (age 26) | 9 | 0 | (Malta Football Association) Żabbar St. Patrick |
| 9 | FW | Djedanoum Fabien | 22 March 2006 (age 20) | 2 | 0 | (Chadian Football Federation) Aiglons |
| 10 | FW | Marius Mouandilmadji | 22 January 1998 (age 28) | 21 | 2 | (Hellenic Football Federation) Olympiacos |
| 11 | FW | Célestin Ecua | 1 January 2002 (age 24) | 2 | 1 | (Tanzania Football Federation) Young Africans |
| 14 | FW | Bertrand Mani | 25 May 1997 (age 29) | 0 | 0 | (Football Federation of Armenia) Gandzasar Kapan |
| 19 | FW | Ahmat Mahamat Abakar | 8 October 2000 (age 26) | 0 | 0 | (Chadian Football Federation) AS PSI N'Djamena |

== Player records ==
As of 12 October 2025
Players in bold are still active with Chad.

=== Most appearances ===
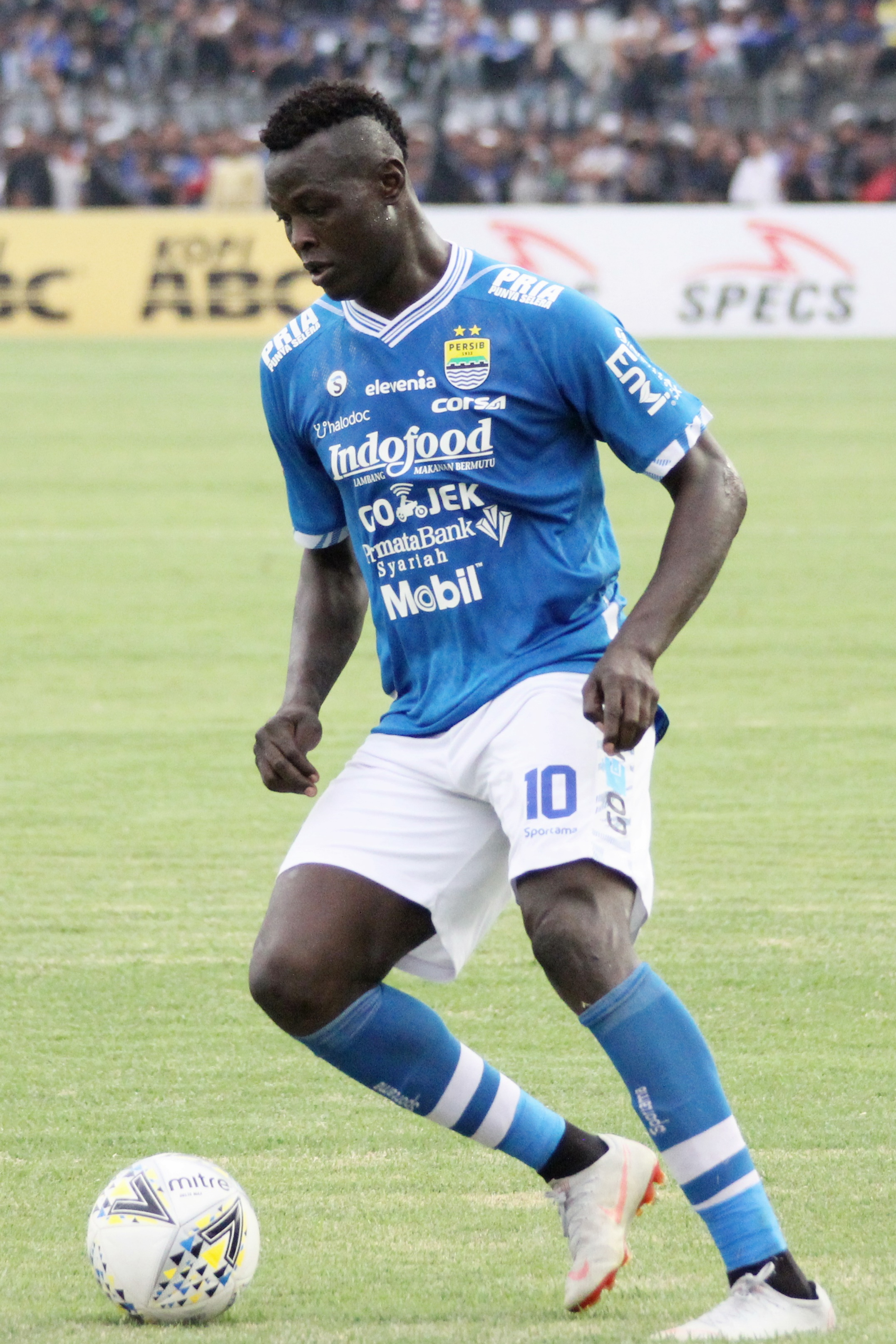
Ezechiel N'Douassel is the national team's most capped player and top scorer in history.

| Rank | Name | Caps | Goals | Career |
|---|---|---|---|---|
| 1 | **Ezechiel N'Douassel** | 51 | 14 | 2005–present |
| 2 | Léger Djimrangar | 38 | 10 | 2007–2020 |
| 3 | Japhet N'Doram | 36 | 13 | 1989–1997 |
| 3 | **Casimir Ninga** | 36 | 5 | 2011–present |
| 5 | Armand Djerabé | 34 | 0 | 2002–2011 |
| 5 | Hilaire Kédigui | 34 | 5 | 2006–2015 |
| 7 | Karl Max Barthélémy | 30 | 3 | 2007–2020 |
| 8 | Marius Mbaiam | 28 | 3 | 2003–2015 |
| 9 | Constant Madtoingué | 26 | 0 | 2011–2020 |
| 10 | **Ahmat Abderamane** | 25 | 4 | 2019–present |

=== Top goalscorers ===
| Rank | Name | Goals | Caps | Ratio | Career |
|---|---|---|---|---|---|
| 1 | **Ezechiel N'Douassel** | 14 | 51 | 0.27 | 2005–present |
| 2 | Japhet N'Doram | 13 | 36 | 0.36 | 1989–1997 |
| 3 | Léger Djimrangar | 10 | 38 | 0.26 | 2007–2020 |
| 4 | Robert Lokossimbayé | 9 | 9 | 1 | 1999–2000 |
| 5 | Hilaire Kédigui | 6 | 34 | 0.18 | 2006–2015 |
| 6 | **Casimir Ninga** | 5 | 36 | 0.14 | 2011–present |
| 7 | Mahamat Labbo | 4 | 17 | 0.24 | 2011–2022 |
| 7 | Ahmed Medego | 4 | 24 | 0.17 | 2006–2015 |
| 7 | **Ahmat Abderamane** | 4 | 25 | 0.16 | 2019–present |
| 10 | Gaius Doumde | 3 | 4 | 0.75 | 2005–2006 |
| 10 | Mahamat Hissein | 3 | 5 | 0.6 | 2003–2006 |
| 10 | Francis Oumar Belonga | 3 | 12 | 0.25 | 1998–2007 |
| 10 | Misdongarde Betolngar | 3 | 12 | 0.25 | 2006–2012 |
| 10 | Marius Mbaiam | 3 | 28 | 0.11 | 2003–2015 |
| 10 | Hisseine Abana | 3 | 15 | 0.2 | 1997–2002 |
| 10 | Ahmat Brahim | 3 | 22 | 0.14 | 1999–2008 |
| 10 | **Marius Mouandilmadji** | 3 | 23 | 0.13 | 2019–present |
| 10 | Karl Max Barthélémy | 3 | 30 | 0.1 | 2007–2020 |

== Competitive record ==
=== FIFA World Cup ===
| FIFA World Cup record | | | | | | | | | Qualification record | | | | | |
| Year | Round | Position | Pld | W | D* | L | GF | GA | Pld | W | D | L | GF | GA |
|---|---|---|---|---|---|---|---|---|---|---|---|---|---|---|
| 1930 to 1958 | Part of France | | | | | | | | Part of France | | | | | |
| (Chile) 1962 | Not a FIFA member | | | | | | | | Not a FIFA member | | | | | |
| 1966 to 1978 | Did not enter | | | | | | | | Did not enter | | | | | |
| (Spain) 1982 | Withdrew | | | | | | | | Withdrew | | | | | |
| 1986 to 1998 | Did not enter | | | | | | | | Did not enter | | | | | |
| (South Korea) (Japan) 2002 | Did not qualify | | | | | | | | 2 | 0 | 1 | 1 | 0 | 1 |
| (Germany) 2006 | Did not qualify | | | | | | | | 2 | 1 | 0 | 1 | 3 | 3 |
| (South Africa) 2010 | Did not qualify | | | | | | | | 6 | 2 | 0 | 4 | 7 | 11 |
| (Brazil) 2014 | Did not qualify | | | | | | | | 2 | 1 | 0 | 1 | 2 | 2 |
| (Russia) 2018 | Did not qualify | | | | | | | | 4 | 2 | 0 | 2 | 3 | 6 |
| (Qatar) 2022 | Did not qualify | | | | | | | | 2 | 0 | 1 | 1 | 1 | 3 |
| (Canada) (Mexico) (United States) 2026 | Did not qualify | | | | | | | | 10 | 0 | 1 | 9 | 5 | 24 |
| (Morocco) (Portugal) (Spain) 2030 | To be determined | | | | | | | | To be determined | | | | | |
| (Saudi Arabia) 2034 | To be determined | | | | | | | | To be determined | | | | | |
| Total | − | 0/15 | − | − | − | − | − | − | 28 | 6 | 3 | 19 | 21 | 50 |

=== Africa Cup of Nations ===
| Africa Cup of Nations record | | | | | | | | | Qualification record | | | | | |
| Year | Round | Position | Pld | W | D | L | GF | GA | Pld | W | D | L | GF | GA |
|---|---|---|---|---|---|---|---|---|---|---|---|---|---|---|
| (Sudan) 1957 | Part of France | | | | | | | | Part of France | | | | | |
| (United Arab Republic) 1959 | Part of France | | | | | | | | Part of France | | | | | |
| (Ethiopia) 1962 | Not affiliated to CAF | | | | | | | | Not affiliated to CAF | | | | | |
| (Ghana) 1963 | Not affiliated to CAF | | | | | | | | Not affiliated to CAF | | | | | |
| (Tunisia) 1965 | Did not enter | | | | | | | | Did not enter | | | | | |
| (Ethiopia) 1968 | Did not enter | | | | | | | | Did not enter | | | | | |
| (Sudan) 1970 | Did not enter | | | | | | | | Did not enter | | | | | |
| (Cameroon) 1972 | Did not enter | | | | | | | | Did not enter | | | | | |
| (Egypt) 1974 | Did not enter | | | | | | | | Did not enter | | | | | |
| (Ethiopia) 1976 | Did not enter | | | | | | | | Did not enter | | | | | |
| (Ghana) 1978 | Did not enter | | | | | | | | Did not enter | | | | | |
| (Nigeria) 1980 | Did not enter | | | | | | | | Did not enter | | | | | |
| (Libya) 1982 | Did not enter | | | | | | | | Did not enter | | | | | |
| (Ivory Coast) 1984 | Did not enter | | | | | | | | Did not enter | | | | | |
| (Egypt) 1986 | Did not enter | | | | | | | | Did not enter | | | | | |
| (Morocco) 1988 | Did not enter | | | | | | | | Did not enter | | | | | |
| (Algeria) 1990 | Did not enter | | | | | | | | Did not enter | | | | | |
| (Senegal) 1992 | Did not qualify | | | | | | | | 6 | 2 | 2 | 2 | 6 | 7 |
| (Tunisia) 1994 | Withdrew during qualifying | | | | | | | | 2 | 0 | 0 | 2 | 0 | 5 |
| (South Africa) 1996 | Did not enter | | | | | | | | Did not enter | | | | | |
| (Burkina Faso) 1998 | Did not enter | | | | | | | | Did not enter | | | | | |
| (Ghana) (Nigeria) 2000 | Did not qualify | | | | | | | | 2 | 0 | 2 | 0 | 1 | 1 |
| (Mali) 2002 | Did not qualify | | | | | | | | 2 | 1 | 0 | 1 | 4 | 4 |
| (Tunisia) 2004 | Did not qualify | | | | | | | | 4 | 1 | 1 | 2 | 4 | 6 |
| (Egypt) 2006 | Did not qualify | | | | | | | | 2 | 1 | 0 | 1 | 3 | 3 |
| (Ghana) 2008 | Did not qualify | | | | | | | | 6 | 0 | 2 | 4 | 3 | 14 |
| (Angola) 2010 | Did not qualify | | | | | | | | 6 | 2 | 0 | 4 | 7 | 11 |
| (Equatorial Guinea) (Gabon) 2012 | Did not qualify | | | | | | | | 8 | 0 | 3 | 5 | 7 | 20 |
| (South Africa) 2013 | Did not qualify | | | | | | | | 2 | 1 | 0 | 1 | 3 | 4 |
| (Equatorial Guinea) 2015 | Did not qualify | | | | | | | | 2 | 1 | 0 | 1 | 3 | 3 |
| (Gabon) 2017 | Withdrew during qualifying | | | | | | | | 3 | 0 | 0 | 3 | 1 | 8 |
| (Egypt) 2019 | Banned | | | | | | | | Banned for withdrawing in 2017 | | | | | |
| (Cameroon) 2021 | Disqualified | | | | | | | | 6 | 0 | 1 | 5 | 2 | 12 |
| (Ivory Coast) 2023 | Did not qualify | | | | | | | | 2 | 0 | 1 | 1 | 2 | 3 |
| (Morocco) 2025 | Did not qualify | | | | | | | | 8 | 2 | 3 | 3 | 4 | 9 |
| (Kenya) (Tanzania) (Uganda) 2027 | To be determined | | | | | | | | To be determined | | | | | |
| 2029 | To be determined | | | | | | | | To be determined | | | | | |
| Total | − | 0/35 | − | − | − | − | − | − | 61 | 11 | 15 | 35 | 50 | 110 |

== Head-to-head records against other countries ==
As of 31 March 2026

| Opponent | Games | Wins | Draws | Losses | Goals For | Goals Against | Goal Differential |
|---|---|---|---|---|---|---|---|
| Algeria | 2 | 0 | 1 | 1 | 1 | 4 | −3 |
| Angola | 2 | 1 | 0 | 1 | 3 | 3 | 0 |
| Bahrain | 1 | 0 | 1 | 0 | 1 | 1 | 0 |
| Benin | 1 | 1 | 0 | 0 | 1 | 0 | +1 |
| Botswana | 2 | 0 | 0 | 2 | 0 | 2 | −2 |
| Burundi | 2 | 0 | 0 | 2 | 0 | 8 | −8 |
| Cameroon | 3 | 0 | 2 | 1 | 0 | 2 | −2 |
| Central African Republic | 10 | 3 | 1 | 6 | 12 | 19 | −7 |
| Comoros | 2 | 0 | 0 | 2 | 0 | 3 | −3 |
| Congo | 13 | 3 | 4 | 6 | 11 | 20 | −9 |
| DR Congo | 2 | 0 | 0 | 2 | 1 | 7 | −6 |
| Egypt | 6 | 1 | 1 | 4 | 3 | 18 | −15 |
| Equatorial Guinea | 10 | 4 | 4 | 2 | 14 | 10 | +4 |
| Ethiopia | 2 | 1 | 0 | 1 | 3 | 3 | 0 |
| Gabon | 14 | 2 | 4 | 8 | 10 | 23 | −13 |
| Gambia | 2 | 0 | 1 | 1 | 2 | 3 | −1 |
| Ghana | 2 | 0 | 1 | 1 | 1 | 6 | −5 |
| Guinea | 3 | 0 | 1 | 2 | 1 | 5 | −4 |
| Ivory Coast | 2 | 0 | 0 | 2 | 0 | 6 | –6 |
| Jordan | 1 | 0 | 0 | 1 | 0 | 1 | −1 |
| Kenya | 2 | 0 | 1 | 1 | 1 | 2 | –1 |
| Mozambique | 1 | 0 | 1 | 0 | 2 | 2 | 0 |
| Niger | 2 | 0 | 1 | 1 | 1 | 3 | –2 |
| Nigeria | 1 | 0 | 0 | 1 | 0 | 2 | –2 |
| Liberia | 5 | 1 | 1 | 3 | 2 | 4 | −2 |
| Libya | 4 | 1 | 0 | 3 | 5 | 10 | −5 |
| Madagascar | 3 | 0 | 0 | 3 | 2 | 8 | −6 |
| Malawi | 6 | 2 | 1 | 3 | 10 | 15 | −5 |
| Mali | 5 | 0 | 0 | 6 | 3 | 14 | −11 |
| Mauritius | 2 | 2 | 0 | 0 | 3 | 1 | +2 |
| Namibia | 4 | 1 | 0 | 3 | 4 | 7 | –3 |
| São Tomé and Príncipe | 1 | 1 | 0 | 0 | 5 | 0 | +5 |
| South Africa | 2 | 0 | 0 | 2 | 0 | 7 | −7 |
| Sierra Leone | 3 | 1 | 2 | 0 | 2 | 1 | +1 |
| Sudan | 8 | 1 | 2 | 5 | 6 | 15 | −9 |
| Tanzania | 1 | 0 | 0 | 1 | 0 | 1 | −1 |
| Tunisia | 4 | 0 | 1 | 3 | 2 | 10 | −8 |
| Uganda | 1 | 0 | 0 | 1 | 0 | 2 | −2 |
| Tanzania | 2 | 1 | 0 | 1 | 2 | 2 | 0 |
| Togo | 2 | 0 | 2 | 0 | 2 | 2 | 0 |
| Yemen | 1 | 0 | 1 | 0 | 0 | 0 | 0 |
| Zambia | 4 | 0 | 2 | 2 | 1 | 4 | −3 |
| 42 Countries | 165 | 27 | 37 | 101 | 117 | 249 | −132 |

== Honours ==
=== Regional ===
- CEMAC Cup
  - (gold) Champions (1): 2014
  - (silver) Runners-up (1): 2015
- UDEAC Championship
  - (silver) Runners-up (2): 1986, 1987

== See also ==
- List of Chad international footballers
- Football in Chad
