= Samuel Itondo =

Cameroonian footballer

Personal information
- Full name: Samuel Bertrand Itondo Eyoum
- Date of birth: 28 July 1987 (age 39)
- Place of birth: Douala, Cameroon
- Position: Midfielder

Senior career*
Years	Team	Apps	(Gls)
20??–2011	Deportivo Mongomo		
2011–2014	Bosher		
2015–20??	Racing de Micomeseng		

International career
2007	Equatorial Guinea U23	1	(0)
2008–2011	Equatorial Guinea B	7	(0)
2011	Equatorial Guinea	4	(2)
- * Club domestic league appearances and goals

Samuel Bertrand Itondo Eyoum (born 28 July 1987) is a footballer who plays as a midfielder. Born and raised in Cameroon, he has represented Equatorial Guinea internationally.

== Career ==
Itondo was a member of the Deportivo Mongomo's squad in the 2011 CAF Champions League.

=== International career ===
Itondo made his senior debut with the Equatoguinean national team on 8 February 2011, when he played a friendly match against Chad.

Also, Itondo had B matches at the 2008 and 2009 CEMAC Cup, against the French side RSC Montreuil in 2011, Brittany, France U-20 and OGC Nice.
