= Hilaire Momi =

Central African Republic footballer

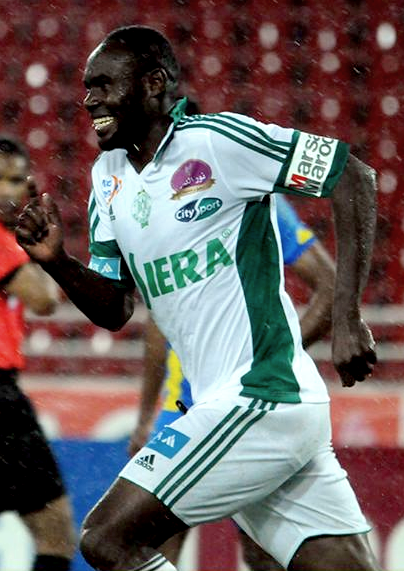

Personal information
- Full name: Hilaire Roméo Verdi Momi
- Date of birth: 16 March 1990 (age 36)
- Place of birth: Bangui, Central African Republic
- Height: 1.87 m (6 ft 2 in)
- Position: Forward

Team information
- Current team: SC Mouloudia Dakhla

Senior career*
Years	Team	Apps	(Gls)
2007–2008	Derbaki Football Center 8		
2008–2011	Coton Sport		
2011–2013	Le Mans	28	(2)
2014–2016	Sint-Truiden	37	(12)
2016	→ RFC Seraing (loan)	12	(1)
2017–2018	Raja Casablanca	19	(4)
2019–	SC Mouloudia Dakhla		

International career^{‡}
2007–2018	Central African Republic	31	(10)
- * Club domestic league appearances and goals as of 18 October 2012 ‡ National team caps and goals as of 9 September 2018

Hilaire Roméo Verdi Momi (born 16 March 1990) is a Central African footballer who plays as a forward for SC Mouloudia Dakhla in Morocco.

He made his international debut in Central African Republic's opening game at the 2007 CEMAC Cup, scoring a goal in their 3–2 defeat to Chad.

== International goals ==
Scores and results list Central African Republic's goal tally first.

No.	Date	Venue	Opponent	Score	Result	Competition
1.	6 March 2007	Stade Omnisports Idriss Mahamat Ouya, N'Djamena, Chad	Chad	1–0	2–3	2007 CEMAC Cup
2.	29 September 2010	Stade Alphonse Massemba-Débat, Brazzaville, Republic of Congo	Cameroon	1–0	1–1	2010 CEMAC Cup
3.	3 October 2010	Stade Alphonse Massemba-Débat, Brazzaville, Republic of Congo	Chad	1–0	3–2	2010 CEMAC Cup
4.	3 October 2010	Stade Alphonse Massemba-Débat, Brazzaville, Republic of Congo	Chad	3–1	3–2	2010 CEMAC Cup
5.	10 October 2010	Barthelemy Boganda Stadium, Bangui, Central African Republic	Algeria	2–0	2–0	2012 Africa Cup of Nations qualification
6.	5 June 2011	Barthelemy Boganda Stadium, Bangui, Central African Republic	Tanzania	1–0	2–1	2012 Africa Cup of Nations qualification
7.	10 August 2011	Ta' Qali National Stadium, Ta' Qali, Malta	Malta	1–1	1–2	Friendly
8.	15 June 2012	Borg El Arab Stadium, Alexandria, Egypt	Egypt	1–1	3–2	2013 Africa Cup of Nations qualification
9.	15 June 2012	Borg El Arab Stadium, Alexandria, Egypt	Egypt	2–2	3–2	2013 Africa Cup of Nations qualification
10.	28 March 2018	Stade de Marrakech, Marrakesh, Morocco	Kenya	3–1	3–2	Friendly

== Honours ==
=== Club ===
Coton Sport FC de Garoua

- Elite One: 2010–11

=== National team ===
- CEMAC Cup: 2009
