= 2010 CEMAC Cup =

Tournament details
- Host country: Republic of the Congo
- Dates: September 24 – October 3
- Teams: 6 (from 1 confederation)
- Venue: 1 (in 1 host city)

Final positions
- Champions: Congo (2nd title)
- Runners-up: Cameroon
- Third place: Central African Republic

Tournament statistics
- Matches played: 10
- Goals scored: 19 (1.9 per match)
- Top scorer(s): (Central African Republic) Hilaire Momi (Chad) Ezechiel Ndouassel
- Best player: (Republic of the Congo) Chancel Massa
- All statistics correct as of September 23.

The 2010 CEMAC Cup was the seventh edition of the CEMAC Cup, the football championship of Central African nations.

The tournament was held in capital city Brazzaville of Republic of the Congo from September 24 to October 3. All matches were played in Stade Alphonse Massemba-Débat.

It was played by 6 teams composed just by players based on local clubs. However, Equatorial Guinea included in their squad to four players who were active in Spanish clubs – Spanish-born Cape Verdean Deivis de Jesus Soares and Equatoguineans Bonifacio Ondo Andeme, Benjamín Sima Obiang and Jaime Chochi Rieba.

== Group stage ==
=== Group A ===
Team	Pts	Pld	W	D	L	GF	GA
Congo	6	2	2	0	0	3	1
Chad	3	2	1	0	1	4	2
Equatorial Guinea	0	2	0	0	2	0	4

September 24

Congo	1 – 0	Equatorial Guinea
Osséré 33'	report (in French)

Stade Alphonse Massemba-Débat
September 26

Chad	3 – 0	Equatorial Guinea
Ndouasel 1', 25'; Medego 23'	report (in French)

Stade Alphonse Massemba-Débat
September 28

Congo	2 – 1	Chad
Tchilimbou 57'; Boukama-Kaya 62'	report (in French)	Karl Max Dany 22'

Stade Alphonse Massemba-Débat

=== Group B ===
Team	Pts	Pld	W	D	L	GF	GA
Cameroon	4	2	1	1	0	2	1
Central African Republic	2	2	0	2	0	1	1
Gabon	1	2	0	1	1	0	1

September 25

Gabon	0 – 0	Central African Republic
	report (in French)

Stade Alphonse Massemba-Débat
September 27

Cameroon	1 – 0	Gabon
Ebonde Ebongue 20'	report (in French)

Stade Alphonse Massemba-Débat
September 29

Cameroon	1 – 1	Central African Republic
Sagong 69'	report (in French)	Momi 54'

Stade Alphonse Massemba-Débat

== Knockout stage ==
=== Semi-final ===
September 30

Congo	1 – 0	Central African Republic
Nkolo 38'	Report (in French)

Stade Alphonse Massemba-Débat
September 30

Cameroon	1 – 0	Chad
Ebonde Ebongue 36'	Report (in French)

Stade Alphonse Massemba-Débat

=== Third-place match ===
October 3

Central African Republic	3 – 2	Chad
Momi 30', 47'; Dertin 37'	Report (in French)	Medego 34'; Ndouassel 81'

Stade Alphonse Massemba-Débat

=== Final ===
October 3

Congo	1 – 1	Cameroon
Boukama-Kaya 22'	Report (in French)	Nkolo 66' (o.g.)
Penalties
	9 – 8

Stade Alphonse Massemba-Débat

== Individual scorers ==
3 goals

- (Central African Republic) Hilaire Momi
- (Chad) Ezechiel Ndouassel

2 goals

- (Cameroon) Philippe Ebonde Ebongue
- (Chad) Ahmed Evariste Medego

1 goal

- (Cameroon) Geremi Sagong
- (Central African Republic) Amorese Dertin
- (Chad) Karl Max Dany
- (Republic of the Congo) Jusly Gitel Boukama-Kaya
- (Republic of the Congo) Freddy De Buisson
- (Republic of the Congo) Loris Nkolo
- (Republic of the Congo) Rochel Osséré
- (Republic of the Congo) Harris Tchilimbou

Own goals

- (Republic of the Congo) Loris Nkolo (for Cameroon)
