= 2014 CEMAC Cup =

Tournament details
- Host country: Equatorial Guinea
- Dates: 1–14 December 2014
- Teams: 6
- Venue: 2 (in 2 host cities)

Final positions
- Champions: Chad (1st title)
- Runners-up: Congo
- Third place: Cameroon
- Fourth place: Equatorial Guinea

Tournament statistics
- Matches played: 10
- Goals scored: 20 (2 per match)
- Top scorer: (Chad) Rodrigue Ninga (4)
- Best player: (Equatorial Guinea) Dio
- Best goalkeeper: (Chad) Mbairamadji Dillah

The 2014 CEMAC Cup is the ninth edition of the CEMAC Cup – the football championship of Central African nations.

The draw was made on 4 October 2014 in Malabo.

Each national team had its own training facility allocated for the duration of the tournament.

- Equatorial Guinea in Mbini
- Cameroon in Alep
- Central African Republic in the Bata Stadium Annex
- Gabon in the La Paz stadium
- Republic of Congo in the Malabo Stadium Annex
- Chad in the Luba Stadium.

== Group stage ==
=== Group A ===
Pos	Team	Pld	W	D	L	GF	GA	GD	Pts	Qualification
1	Equatorial Guinea	2	1	1	0	4	0	+4	4	Knockout stage
2	Cameroon	2	1	1	0	1	0	+1	4	Knockout stage
3	Central African Republic	2	0	0	2	0	5	−5	0	

Updated to match(es) played on 8 December 2014. Source: guineaecuatorialpress.com
1 December 2014

Equatorial Guinea	4–0	Central African Republic
Ellong 5'; Juvenal 35' (pen.); Bama 43'; Rubén Darío 65'	report

Estadio de Bata, Bata
Referee: Alhadi Allaou Mahamat (Chad)

3 December 2014

Cameroon	1–0	Central African Republic
Manga Mbah 22'	report

Estadio de Bata, Bata
Referee: Béranger Woungui Antsagara (Gabon)

6 December 2014

Equatorial Guinea	0–0	Cameroon
	report

Estadio de Bata, Bata
Referee: Messie Nkounkou Mvoutou (Congo)

=== Group B ===
Pos	Team	Pld	W	D	L	GF	GA	GD	Pts	Qualification
1	Congo	2	1	1	0	3	2	+1	4	Knockout stage
2	Chad	2	1	1	0	2	1	+1	4	Knockout stage
3	Gabon	2	0	0	2	1	3	−2	0	

Updated to match(es) played on 8 December 2014. Source: guineaecuatorialpress.com
1 December 2014

Gabon	1–2	Congo
Ambourouet 13'	report	Bidimbou 31'; Itoua 35'

Estadio de Malabo, Malabo
Referee: Joaquin Ela Esono Eyang (Equatorial Guinea)

4 December 2014

Congo	1–1	Chad
Mouanga Biassadila 45+1'	report	Ninga 33'

Estadio de Malabo, Malabo
Referee: Jean-Marc Ganamandji (Central African Republic)

7 December 2014

Gabon	0–1	Chad
	report	Ninga 73' (pen.)

Estadio de Malabo, Malabo
Referee: Antoine Effa (Cameroon)

== Knockout stage ==
=== Semi-finals ===
9 December 2014

Equatorial Guinea	0–2	Chad
	report	Leger 48'; Ninga 86'

Estadio de Bata, Bata
Referee: Béranger Woungui Antsagara (Gabon)

9 December 2014

Congo	2–0	Cameroon
Bidimbou; Binguila

Referee: Joaquin Ela Esono Eyang (Equatorial Guinea)

=== Third-place playoff ===
12 December 2014

Equatorial Guinea	0–0	Cameroon
	report
Penalties
	6–7

Estadio de Malabo, Malabo

=== Final ===
14 December 2014

Chad	3–2	Congo
Leger 10'; Leger 25'; Ninga 59' (pen.)	report	Binguila 34' (pen.); Issambet 61'

Estadio de Bata, Bata
Referee: Antoine Effa (Cameroon)

== Statistics ==
=== Goalscorers ===
4 goals

- (Chad) Rodrigue Ninga

3 goals

- (Chad) Léger Djimrangar

2 goals

- (Republic of the Congo) Kader Bidimbou
- (Republic of the Congo) Hardy Binguila

1 goal

- (Cameroon) Manga Bah
- (Republic of the Congo) Saïra Issambet
- (Republic of the Congo) Grâce Mamic Itoua
- (Republic of the Congo) Arci Mouanga Biassadila
- (Equatorial Guinea) Franklin Bama
- (Equatorial Guinea) Juvenal Edjogo Owono
- (Equatorial Guinea) Rubén Darío
- (Equatorial Guinea) Viera Ellong
- (Gabon) Georges Ambourouet

=== Awards ===
Player of the tournament

- (Equatorial Guinea) Dio

Top goalscorer

- (Chad) Rodrigue Ninga (4)

Best goalkeeper

- (Chad) Mbairamadji Dillah
