= 2009 CEMAC Cup =

Tournament details
- Host country: Central African Republic
- Dates: December 1–December 13
- Teams: 6 (from 1 confederation)
- Venue: 1 (in 1 host city)

Final positions
- Champions: Central African Republic (1st title)
- Runners-up: Equatorial Guinea
- Third place: Chad

Tournament statistics
- Matches played: 10
- Goals scored: 26 (2.6 per match)
- Top scorer(s): (Central African Republic) Hilaire Momi (5 goals)

The 2009 CEMAC Cup was the sixth edition of the CEMAC Cup, the football championship of Central African nations.

The tournament was held from December 1 to December 13 in the Central African Republic. The tournament was played by 6 teams composed just by players based on local clubs. All matches were played in the Barthelemy Boganda Stadium. Central African Republic managed to beat Equatorial Guinea in the final by 3-0, and won their first title in this tournament.

== First round ==
=== Group A ===
| Team | Pts | Pld | W | D | L | GF | GA |
|---|---|---|---|---|---|---|---|
| Central African Republic | 6 | 2 | 2 | 0 | 0 | 3 | 0 |
| Equatorial Guinea | 1 | 2 | 0 | 1 | 1 | 2 | 3 |
| Congo | 1 | 2 | 0 | 1 | 1 | 2 | 4 |

Dec 1, 2009

| Central African Republic | 1 – 0 | Equatorial Guinea |
|---|---|---|
| Amores Dertin 47' |

Dec 3, 2009

| Congo | 2 – 2 | Equatorial Guinea |
|---|---|---|
| José-Princelin Kouyou 28'; Durel Akoli 90' (pen.) | | Daniel Ekedo 41' (pen.); Emmanuel Essono 83' |

Dec 5， 2009

| Central African Republic | 2 – 0 | Congo |
|---|---|---|
| Ferdinand Kémo 7'; Hilaire Momi 87' (pen.) |

=== Group B ===
| Team | Pts | Pld | W | D | L | GF | GA |
|---|---|---|---|---|---|---|---|
| Chad | 3 | 2 | 1 | 0 | 1 | 4 | 4 |
| Gabon | 3 | 2 | 1 | 0 | 1 | 4 | 4 |
| Cameroon | 3 | 2 | 1 | 0 | 1 | 1 | 1 |

Dec 2， 2009

| Cameroon | 1 – 0 | Chad |
|---|---|---|
| Kelvin Agbor 38' |

Dec 4， 2009

| Chad | 4 – 3 | Gabon |
|---|---|---|
| Ahmed-Evariste Medego 40'; Karl Max Dany 57'; Yaya Kerim 69'; Leger Djime 90+1' | | Geoffroy Ngame Essono 28', 33'; Johan Lengoualama 76' |

Dec 6， 2009

| Gabon | 1 – 0 | Cameroon |
|---|---|---|
| Geoffroy Ngame Essono 53' |

== Knockout round ==
=== Semi-finals ===
Dec 9， 2009

| Central African Republic | 2 – 1 | Gabon |
|---|---|---|
| Hilaire Momi 3', 39' | | Johan Lengoualama 13' |

Dec 10， 2009

| Chad | 0 – 1 | Equatorial Guinea |
|---|---|---|
| | | Landry Mpondo 62' |

=== 3rd place playoff ===
Dec 12， 2009

| Chad | 2 – 1 | Gabon |
|---|---|---|
| Yaya Kerim 32'; Karl Max Dany 79' | | Geoffroy Ngame Essono 23' (pen.) |

=== Final ===
2009-12-13

| Central African Republic | 3 – 0 | Equatorial Guinea |
|---|---|---|
| Salif Keita 2'; Hilaire Momi 13', 86' | Report |

Stade Barthélemy Boganda
Attendance: 20,000
Referee: Neguel Damgwa (Cameroon)

== Individual scorers ==
5 goals

- (Central African Republic) Hilaire Momi

4 goals

- (Gabon) Geoffroy Ngame Essono

2 goals

- (Chad) Yaya Kerim
- (Chad) Karl Max Dany
- (Gabon) Johan Lengoualama

1 goal

- (Cameroon) Kelvin Agbor
- (Central African Republic) Amorese Dertin
- (Central African Republic) Ferdinand Kémo
- (Central African Republic) Salif Keita
- (Chad) Ahmed-Evariste Medego
- (Chad) Leger Djime
- (Republic of the Congo) Durel Akoli
- (Republic of the Congo) José-Princelin Kouyou
- (Equatorial Guinea) Daniel Ekedo
- (Equatorial Guinea) Manuel 'Ricky' Esono
- (Equatorial Guinea) Landry Mpondo
