= Adib Barakat =

Syrian footballer (born 1982)

Personal information
- Full name: Adib Barakat
- Date of birth: 6 June 1982 (age 44)
- Place of birth: Syria
- Height: 1.84 m (6 ft 0 in)
- Position: Defender

Team information
- Current team: Bowsher

Senior career*
Years	Team	Apps	(Gls)
–2006	Tishreen SC		
2006–2007	Qardaha SC		
2007–2008	Taliya SC		
2008–2010	Tishreen SC		
2010–2012	Al-Wathba SC		
2012	Najaf		
2013	Al-Karkh		
2014	Bowsher		

International career^{‡}
2005–2010	Syria	13	(0)
- * Club domestic league appearances and goals ‡ National team caps and goals as of 24 October 2012

Adib Barakat (Arabic: أديب بركات, born 6 June 1982 in Syria) is a Syrian footballer who plays as a defender for Bowsher, which competes in the Omani First Division and is a former member of the Syria national football team.
