= 2007 CEMAC Cup =

Tournament details
- Host country: Chad
- Teams: 6 (from 1 confederation)

Final positions
- Champions: Congo (1st title)
- Runners-up: Gabon
- Third place: Chad

Tournament statistics
- Matches played: 10
- Goals scored: 27 (2.7 per match)
- Top scorer: (Gabon) Georges Akieremy (4)

The 2007 CEMAC Cup was the fourth edition of the CEMAC Cup, the football championship of Central African nations.

The tournament was held in from 4 March to 16 March in Ndjamena, Chad.

== Group round ==
=== Group A ===
Team	Pld	W	D	L	GF	GA	Pts
Chad	2	2	0	0	5	3	6
Central African Republic	2	0	1	1	2	3	1
Cameroon (amateur team)	2	0	1	1	1	2	1

March 4, 2007	Chad	2–1	Cameroon (amateur team)
March 6, 2007	Chad	3–2	Central African Republic
March 8, 2007	(amateur team) Cameroon	0–0	Central African Republic

=== Group B ===
Team	Pld	W	D	L	GF	GA	Pts
Congo	2	1	1	0	4	3	4
Gabon	2	0	2	0	3	3	2
Equatorial Guinea	2	0	1	1	2	3	1

March 5, 2007	Congo	2–1	Equatorial Guinea
March 7, 2007	Congo	2–2	Gabon
March 9, 2007	Equatorial Guinea	1–1	Gabon

== Knockout round ==
=== Semi-finals ===
March 11, 2007	Chad	1–2	Gabon
March 12, 2007	Congo	4–1	Central African Republic

=== 3rd place playoff ===
March 15, 2007	Chad	1–0 (aet)	Central African Republic

=== Final ===
Congo	1–0	Gabon
Destin Makita 59' (pen.)

Ndjamena, Chad

2007 CEMAC Cup

Congo
First title
