= 2003 CEMAC Cup =

Tournament details
- Host country: Republic of the Congo
- Teams: 4 (from 1 confederation)

Final positions
- Champions: Cameroon (1st title)
- Runners-up: Central African Republic
- Third place: Congo

Tournament statistics
- Matches played: 8
- Goals scored: 24 (3 per match)

The 2003 CEMAC Cup was the first edition of the CEMAC Cup, the football championship of Central African nations. It is the successor of the UDEAC Cup from 1984 to 1990. Originally the first edition was planned to take place in Bangui, Central African Republic in 2002, but it was canceled.

The tournament was held in the Congo. All matches were played in Stade Alphonse Massemba-Débat, Brazzaville.

== First round ==
=== Group A ===
Team	Pts	Pld	W	D	L	GF	GA
Congo	4	2	1	1	0	4	3
Gabon	1	2	0	1	1	3	4
Chad	withdrew						

Dec 5, 2003	Congo	3–2	Gabon
Dec 9, 2003	Gabon	1–1	Congo

=== Group B ===
Team	Pts	Pld	W	D	L	GF	GA
Central African Republic	4	2	1	1	0	3	2
Cameroon (Amateur team)	1	2	0	1	1	2	3
Equatorial Guinea	withdrew						

Dec 7, 2003	(Amateur team) Cameroon	2–2	Central African Republic
Dec 9, 2003	Central African Republic	1–0	Cameroon (Amateur team)

== Semi-finals ==
Dec 11, 2003	Congo	0–2	Cameroon (Amateur team)
Dec 11, 2003	Central African Republic	2–0	Gabon

== 3rd Place Playoff ==
Dec 13, 2003	Congo	1–0	Gabon

== Final ==
Dec 13, 2003	(Amateur team) Cameroon	3–2	Central African Republic

2003 CEMAC Cup

Cameroon
First title
