= Casimir Ninga =

Chadian footballer (born 1993)

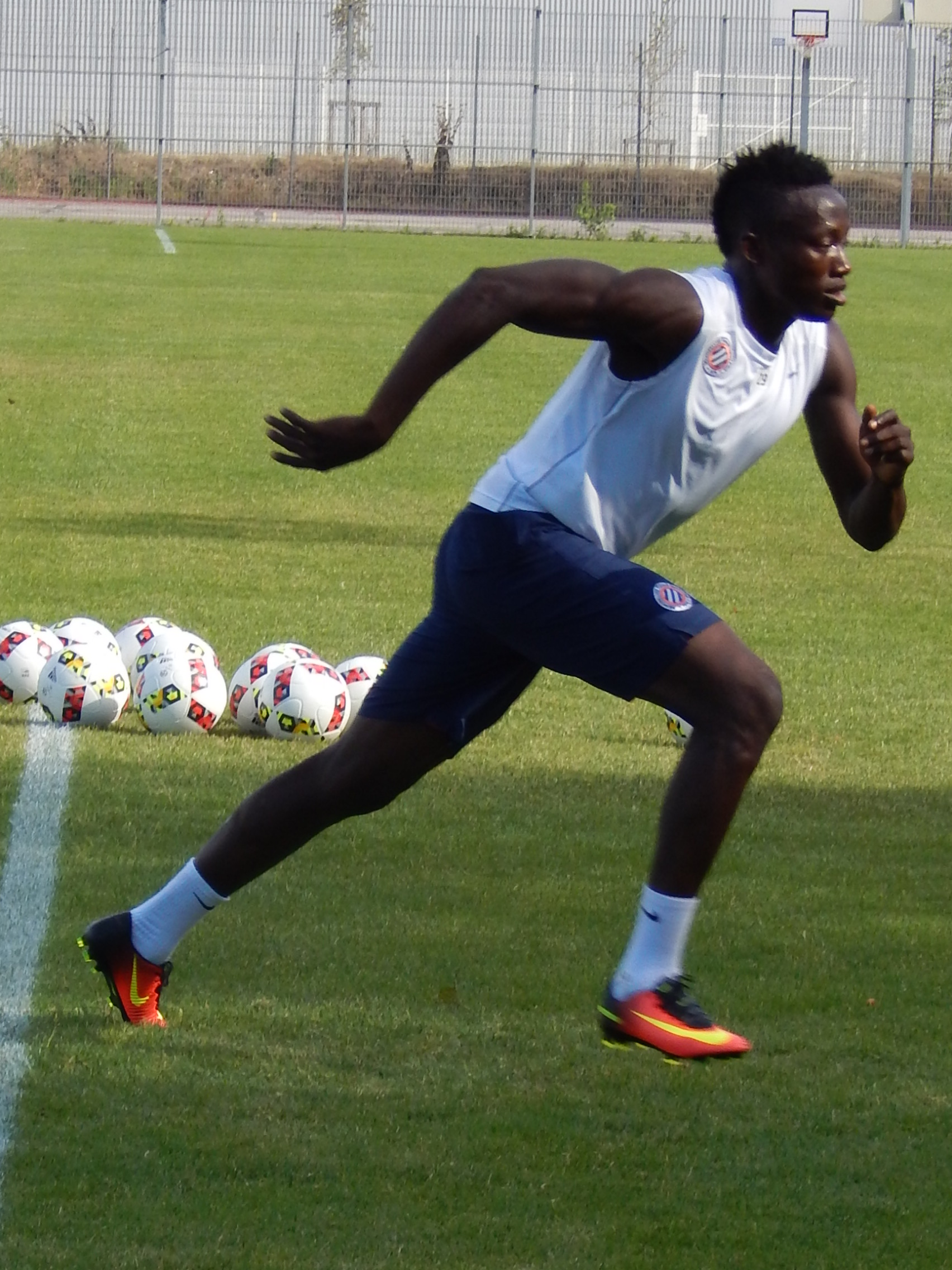
- Ninga with Montpellier in 2016

Personal information
- Full name: Rodrigue Casimir Ninga
- Date of birth: 17 May 1993 (age 33)
- Place of birth: Mandoul, Chad
- Height: 1.86 m (6 ft 1 in)
- Position: Forward

Team information
- Current team: Al-Tadamon
- Number: 11

Senior career*
Years	Team	Apps	(Gls)
2011–2013	Renaissance		(12)
2013–2015	Mangasport		
2015–2018	Montpellier	64	(13)
2018–2019	Caen	34	(6)
2019–2022	Angers	33	(3)
2020–2021	→ Sivasspor (loan)	16	(0)
2022–2023	Anorthosis	27	(5)
2023–	Sumgayit	28	(7)

International career^{‡}
2011–	Chad	29	(5)
- * Club domestic league appearances and goals as of 26 May 2024 ‡ National team caps and goals as of 18 November 2019

Rodrigue Casimir Ninga (Arabic: كازيمير نينقا; born 17 May 1993) is a Chadian professional footballer who plays as a forward for Kuwaiti Premier League club Al-Tadamon and the Chad national team.

== Club career ==
Ninga was born in Mandoul, a region located in the southern part of Chad. Ninga was the top goalscorer of the Gabon Championnat National D1 in the 2013–14 season. He also won two consecutive Gabon Championnat National D1 titles with Mangasport in the 2013–14 and 2014–15 seasons.

In the summer of 2015, Ninga signed for Ligue 1 club Montpellier HSC, where he registered 7 goals and 4 assists in 26 Ligue 1 matches in his first season. On 1 October 2016, Ninga scored a hat-trick for Montpellier against Dijon in the 3–3 Ligue 1 away draw.

On 8 August 2019, Ninga joined Ligue 1 club Angers SCO by signing a three-year contract. On 22 September 2019, he came on as a substitute in the 69th minute and scored a hat-trick (and his first Ligue 1 goal for Angers) in the 4–1 Ligue 1 home win over Saint-Étienne to enable Angers to take provisional second place in the Ligue 1 table.

On 27 August 2020, he went to Sivasspor on loan.

=== Anorthosis Famagusta ===
On 12 July 2022, Ninga signed with Cypriot First Division club Anorthosis Famagusta on a two-year contract until 2024. On 4 July 2023, he was announced by the management of Anorthosis that he had left the club.

== Career statistics ==
=== Club ===
As of match played 16 June 2023

Appearances and goals by club, season and competition
Club	Season	League			National cup		League cup		Continental		Other		Total	
Club	Season	Division	Apps	Goals	Apps	Goals	Apps	Goals	Apps	Goals	Apps	Goals	Apps	Goals
Montpellier	2015–16	Ligue 1	26	7	1	0	0	0	—		—		27	7
Montpellier	2016–17	Ligue 1	9	5	—		—		—		—		9	5
Montpellier	2017–18	Ligue 1	29	1	3	2	2	1	—		—		34	4
Montpellier	Total		64	13	4	2	2	1	—		—		70	16
Caen	2018–19	Ligue 1	33	6	2	2	1	0	—		—		36	8
Caen	2019–20	Ligue 2	1	0	—		—		—		—		1	0
Caen	Total		34	6	2	2	1	0	—		—		37	8
Angers	2019–20	Ligue 1	16	3	1	0	0	0	—		—		17	3
Angers	2020–21	Ligue 1	1	0	—		—		—		—		1	0
Angers	2021–22	Ligue 1	16	0	1	0	0	0	—		—		17	0
Angers	Total		33	3	2	0	0	0	—		—		35	3
Sivasspor (loan)	2020–21	Süper Lig	16	0	2	0	—		4	0	—		22	0
Anorthosis	2022–23	Cyta Championship	27	5	2	0	—		—		—		29	5
Career total			174	27	12	4	3	1	4	0	0	0	193	32

=== International ===
Scores and results list Chad's goal tally first.

Goal	Date	Venue	Opponent	Score	Result	Competition
1.	31 May 2014	Stade Omnisports Idriss Mahamat Ouya, N'Djamena, Chad	Malawi	2–0	3–1	2015 Africa Cup of Nations qualification
2.	4 December 2014	Estadio de Malabo, Malabo, Equatorial Guinea	Congo	1–0	1–1	2014 CEMAC Cup
3.	7 December 2014	Estadio de Malabo, Malabo, Equatorial Guinea	Gabon	1–0	1–0	2014 CEMAC Cup
4.	9 December 2014	Estadio de Bata, Bata, Equatorial Guinea	Equatorial Guinea	1–0	1–0	2014 CEMAC Cup
5.	14 December 2014	Estadio de Bata, Bata, Equatorial Guinea	Congo	3–1	3–2	2014 CEMAC Cup

- Note: Matches of the 2014 CEMAC Cup were not FIFA official matches, thus the goals from these matches are not counted as official.

== Honours ==
Chad

- CEMAC Cup: 2014
