= 2020–21 Sivasspor season =

Sivasspor
2020–21 season
- Chairman: Mecnun Otyakmaz
- Manager: Rıza Çalımbay
- Stadium: Sivas Stadium
- Süper Lig: 5th (UEFA Europa Conference League)
- Turkish Cup: Quarter-finals
- UEFA Europa League: Group stage
- Top goalscorer: League: Max Gradel; Mustapha Yatabaré (10 each); All: Mustapha Yatabaré (12 goals)
Home colours	Away colours	Third colours

The 2020–21 season was the 54th season in existence of Sivasspor and the club's fourth consecutive season in the top flight of Turkish football. In addition to the domestic league, Sivasspor participate in this season's editions of the Turkish Cup and the UEFA Europa League. The season covers the period from July 2020 to 30 June 2021.

== Players ==
=== Current squad ===
As of 9 July 2020.

Note: Flags indicate national team as defined under FIFA eligibility rules; some limited exceptions apply. Players may hold more than one non-FIFA nationality.

No.	Pos.	Nation	Player
2	FW	CIV	Arouna Koné
3	DF	TUR	Uğur Çiftçi
4	DF	GAB	Aaron Appindangoyé
5	MF	GHA	Isaac Cofie
6	MF	BRA	Claudemir
7	FW	CIV	Max Gradel
8	MF	GER	Robin Yalçın
9	FW	MLI	Mustapha Yatabaré
10	MF	TUR	Yasin Öztekin
11	FW	ESP	Jorge Félix
14	DF	FRA	Samba Camara
17	MF	GER	Erdoğan Yeşilyurt
19	DF	TUR	Eren Şahin
20	MF	TUR	Kerem Atakan Kesgin

No.	Pos.	Nation	Player
22	MF	SRB	Armin Đerlek
23	MF	UKR	Serhiy Rybalka
25	GK	TUR	Muammer Yıldırım
26	DF	TUR	Barış Yardımcı
29	FW	CHA	Casimir Ninga (on loan from Angers)
30	GK	MLI	Mamadou Samassa
35	GK	TUR	Ali Şaşal Vural
37	MF	TUR	Hakan Arslan
52	DF	TUR	Volkan Eğri
58	DF	TUR	Ziya Erdal
76	MF	MAR	Fayçal Fajr
80	FW	NGR	Olarenwaju Kayode (on loan from Shakhtar Donetsk)
87	DF	BRA	Marcelo Goiano
88	DF	TUR	Caner Osmanpaşa

=== Out on loan ===
Note: Flags indicate national team as defined under FIFA eligibility rules; some limited exceptions apply. Players may hold more than one non-FIFA nationality.

No.	Pos.	Nation	Player
—	MF	TUR	Furkan Sağman (at Sivas Belediyespor)

== Transfers ==
=== In ===
Date from	Position	Nationality	Name	From	Fee	Ref.
4 August 2020	FW	(Spain)	Jorge Félix	(Poland) Piast Gliwice	Free	
28 August 2020	MF	(Germany)	Robin Yalçın	(Turkey) Yeni Malatyaspor	Free	
14 September 2020	MF	(Morocco)	Fayçal Fajr	(Spain) Getafe CF	Free	

=== Loans in ===
Date from	Position	Nationality	Name	From	Date to	Ref.
27 August 2020	FW	(Chad)	Casimir Ninga	(France) Angers	End of season	
17 September 2020	FW	(Mali)	Olarenwaju Kayode	(Ukraine) Shakhtar Donetsk	End of season	
1 February 2021	FW	(United States)	Tyler Boyd	(Turkey) Beşiktaş	End of season	

== Pre-season and friendlies ==
Win Draw Loss

== Competitions ==
=== Overview ===
Competition	First match	Last match	Starting round	Final position	Record							
Competition	First match	Last match	Starting round	Final position	Pld	W	D	L	GF	GA	GD	Win %
Süper Lig	12 September 2020	May 2021	Matchday 1		39	15	17	7	52	42	+10	38.46
Turkish Cup	17 December 2020	11 February 2021	Fifth round	Quarter-finals	3	2	0	1	3	2	+1	66.67
UEFA Europa League	22 October 2020	10 December 2020	Group stage	Group stage	6	2	0	4	9	11	−2	33.33
Total					48	19	17	12	64	55	+9	39.58

Last updated: 11 May 2021
Source: Competitions

=== Süper Lig ===
==== League table ====
Pos	Team	Pld	W	D	L	GF	GA	GD	Pts	Qualification or relegation
3	Fenerbahçe	40	25	7	8	72	41	+31	82	Qualification for the Europa League play-off round
4	Trabzonspor	40	19	14	7	50	37	+13	71	Qualification for the Europa Conference League third qualifying round
5	Sivasspor	40	16	17	7	54	43	+11	65	Qualification for the Europa Conference League second qualifying round
6	Hatayspor	40	17	10	13	62	53	+9	61	
7	Alanyaspor	40	17	9	14	58	45	+13	60	

Source: Süper Lig, Soccerway
Rules for classification: 1) Points; 2) Head-to-head points; 3) Head-to-head goal difference; 4) Head-to-head goals scored; 5) Goal difference; 6) Goals scored; 7) Play-off.

==== Results summary ====
Overall								Home						Away					
Pld	W	D	L	GF	GA	GD	Pts	W	D	L	GF	GA	GD	W	D	L	GF	GA	GD
39	15	17	7	52	42	+10	62	6	9	4	17	14	+3	9	8	3	35	28	+7

Last updated: 11 May 2021.
Source: FBref

==== Results by round ====
Round	1	2	3	4	5	6	7	8	9	10	11	12	13	14	15	16	17	18	19	20	21	22	23	24	25	26	27	28	29	30	31	32	33	34	35	36	37	38	39	40	41	42
Ground	H	A	H	B	A	H	A	H	A	H	A	H	A	H	A	H	A	H	A	H	A	A	H	A	B	H	A	H	A	H	A	H	A	H	A	H	A	H	A	H	A	H
Result	L	W	D	B	W	L	D	L	D	L	D	D	W	W	L	D	D	W	D	D	L	L	D	W	B	W	D	D	D	W	W	D	W	W	W	D	D	W	W	D	W	
Position	19	11	12	13	7	14	12	15	14	16	16	16	16	14	14	14	14	11	11	12	14	14	14	11	12	11	11	11	11	10	9	9	9	9	8	8	7	7	5	6	5	

Updated to match(es) played on 11 May 2021. Source: TFF.org
A = Away; H = Home; B = Bye; W = Win; D = Draw; L = Loss

==== Matches ====
12 September 2020 1	Sivasspor	0–2	Alanyaspor	Sivas
18:00 TRT (UTC+3)	Arslan (yellow card) 36'; Osmanpaşa (yellow card) 50'; Yeşilyurt (yellow card) 74'; Çiftçi (yellow card) 75'	Report	Moubandje (yellow card) 4'; Davidson 21' (yellow card) 74'; Caulker 90'	Stadium: New Sivas 4 Eylül Stadium; Attendance: 0 Referee: Ali Palabıyık

20 September 2020 2	BB Erzurumspor	1–2	Sivasspor	Erzurum
13:30 TRT (UTC+3)	Novikovas 70'	Report	Koné 82'; Gradel 86'	Stadium: Kazım Karabekir Stadium; Attendance: 0 Referee: Serkan Tokat

27 September 2020 3	Sivasspor	0–0	Ankaragücü	Sivas
16:00 TRT (UTC+3)	Yeşilyurt (yellow card) 53'	Report	Adžić (yellow card) 59'; Pazdan (yellow card) 90+3'	Stadium: New Sivas 4 Eylül Stadium; Attendance: 0 Referee: Arda Kardeşler

4	BYE

17 October 2020 5	Kayserispor	1–3	Sivasspor	Kayseri
16:00 TRT (UTC+3)	Kanga 52'; Săpunaru (red card) 75'	Report	Erdal 28'; Yatabaré 60'; Fajr 83'	Stadium: Kadir Has Stadium; Attendance: 0 Referee: Halil Umut Meler

26 October 2020 6	Sivasspor	0–2	Çaykur Rizespor	Sivas
20:00 TRT (UTC+3)		Report	Baiano 3'; Rémy 90+1'	Stadium: New Sivas 4 Eylül Stadium; Attendance: 0 Referee: Yaşar Kemal Uğurlu

2 November 2020 7	Hatayspor	1–1	Sivasspor	Hatay
20:00 TRT (UTC+3)	David 8'; Ribeiro (yellow card) 65' (yellow-red card) 82'	Report	Gradel 6'	Stadium: Hatay New Stadium; Attendance: 0 Referee: Yasin Kol

8 November 2020 8	Sivasspor	1–2	Galatasaray	Sivas
19:00 TRT (UTC+3)	Fajr (penalty missed); Caner 76'	Report	Belhanda 19'; Arda 48'; Taylan (yellow card) 45+5'; Babel (yellow card) 52'; Okan (yellow card) 90+7'	Stadium: 4 Eylül Stadium; Attendance: 0 Referee: Abdulkadir Bitigen

21 November 2020 9	Fatih Karagümrük	1–1	Sivasspor	Istanbul
13:30 TRT (UTC+3)	Biglia (yellow card) 32'; Ndao (yellow card) 78'; Sabo 86' (yellow card) 90+6'; Lichaj (yellow card) 90+3'	Report	Lichaj 44' (o.g.); Camara (yellow card) 45+2'; Cofie (yellow card) 83'; Samassa (yellow card) 85'	Stadium: Atatürk Olympic Stadium; Attendance: 0 Referee: Hüseyin Göçek

30 November 2020 10	Sivasspor	0–1	Göztepe	Sivas
19:30 TRT (UTC+3)	Cofie (yellow card) 59'	Report	Akbunar (yellow card) 46' (goal) 80'; Kayan (yellow card) 57'; Ndiaye (yellow card) 88'	Stadium: 4 Eylül Stadium; Attendance: 0 Referee: Serkan Tokat

7 December 2020 11	Trabzonspor	1–1	Sivasspor	Trabzon
19:30 TRT (UTC+3)	Caleb Ekuban 45'	Report	Hakan Arslan 76'; Faycal Fajr (yellow card) 83'	Stadium: Şenol Güneş Stadium; Referee: Suat Arslanboğa

14 December 2020 12	Sivasspor	0–0	Antalyaspor	Sivas
19:00 TRT (UTC+3)		Report		Stadium: 4 Eylül Stadium; Attendance: 0 Referee: Halis Özkahya

21 December 2020 13	Konyaspor	0–1	Sivasspor	Konya
19:00 TRT (UTC+3)		Report	Fajr 60'	Stadium: Konya Büyükşehir Stadium; Attendance: 0 Referee: Fırat Aydınus

24 December 2020 14	Sivasspor	3–1	Gençlerbirliği	Sivas
16:00 TRT (UTC+3)	Gradel 45+2'; Arslan 71'; Yatabaré 86'	Report	Kızıldağ 90+2'	Stadium: 4 Eylül Stadium; Attendance: 0 Referee: Tugay Kaan Numanoğlu

28 December 2020 15	Beşiktaş	3–0	Sivasspor	Istanbul
19:00 TRT (UTC+3)	Yalçın 18'; Nkoudou (yellow card) 42'; Larin 84'; Özyakup 90+2'	Report	Arslan (yellow card) 45+5' (yellow-red card) 45+5'; Cofie (yellow card) 90'	Stadium: Vodafone Park; Attendance: 0 Referee: Arda Kardeşler
Note: Match was played behind closed doors due to the COVID-19 pandemic in Turkey.

2 January 2021 16	Sivasspor	2–2	Denizlispor	Sivas
13:30 TRT (UTC+3)	Gradel 26' (pen.); Fajr 45+1'	Report	Rodallega 17'; Mešanović 90+3'	Stadium: 4 Eylül Stadium; Attendance: 0 Referee: Erkan Özdamar

5 January 2021 17	Yeni Malatyaspor	2–2	Sivasspor	Malatya
16:00 TRT (UTC+3)	Fofana 25'; Tetteh 66'	Report	Yeşilyurt 18'; Gradel 32'	Stadium: Malatya Arena; Attendance: 0 Referee: Sarper Barış Saka

9 January 2021 18	Sivasspor	2–1	Gaziantep	Sivas
13:30 TRT (UTC+3)	Arslan 41', 47' (yellow card) 43'; Yalçın (yellow card) 74'; Çiftçi (yellow card) 85'	Report	Maxim 4'; Vural (yellow card) 31'; Güvenç (yellow card) 37'; Aktaş (yellow card) 63'; Jefferson (red card) 79'	Stadium: 4 Eylül Stadium; Attendance: 0 Referee: Mustafa Öğretmenoğlu

16 January 2021 19	İstanbul Başakşehir	1–1	Sivasspor	Istanbul
16:00 TRT (UTC+3)	Epureanu (yellow card) 20'; Aleksić 38'; Tekdemir (yellow card) 90+6'	Report	Yalçın (yellow card) 34'; Arslan 42'; Appindangoyé (yellow card) 90+5'	Stadium: Başakşehir Fatih Terim Stadium; Attendance: 0 Referee: Alper Ulusoy

21 January 2021 20	Sivasspor	1–1	Fenerbahçe	Sivas
19:00 TRT (UTC+3)	Yatabaré 18' (yellow card) 79'; Appindangoyé (yellow card) 45'	Report	Sangaré (yellow card) 27'; Valencia 45' (pen.)	Stadium: 4 Eylül Stadium; Attendance: 0 Referee: Yaşar Kemal Uğurlu

25 January 2021 21	Kasımpaşa	2–0	Sivasspor	Istanbul
16:00 TRT (UTC+3)	Hajradinović 6'; Kara 17'	Report		Stadium: Recep Tayyip Erdoğan Stadium; Attendance: 0 Referee: Mert Güzenge

31 January 2021 22	Alanyaspor	3–1	Sivasspor	Alanya
16:00 TRT (UTC+3)	Aksoy 14'; Davidson 45+3'; Babacar 60'	Report	Gradel 90' (pen.)	Stadium: Bahçeşehir Okulları Stadium; Attendance: 0 Referee: Zorbay Küçük

3 February 2021 23	Sivasspor	0–0	BB Erzurumspor	Sivas
13:30 TRT (UTC+3)	Erdal (yellow card) 57'	Report	Uçar (yellow card) 65'	Stadium: 4 Eylül Stadium; Attendance: 0 Referee: Fırat Aydınus

7 February 2021 24	Ankaragücü	1–4	Sivasspor	Ankara
16:00 TRT (UTC+3)	Akdağ (yellow card) 20'; Kitsiou (yellow card) 55'; Badji (yellow card) 60'; Oğuz 66' (o.g.); Cetin (yellow card) 71'	Report	Gradel 9' (pen.); Kayode 48'; Yeşilyurt (yellow card) 58' (goal) 69'; Yatabaré 86'	Stadium: Eryaman Stadium; Attendance: 0 Referee: Burak Şeker

25	BYE

21 February 2021 26	Sivasspor	2–0	Kayserispor	Sivas
16:00 TRT (UTC+3)	Camara (yellow card) 8'; Gradel 18'; Çiftçi (yellow card) 84'; Yıldırım (yellow card) 87'; Yeşilyurt 90+2' (pen.)	Report	Kvržić (yellow card) 12'; Muhar (yellow card) 45+2'; Campanharo (yellow card) 67'; Demirok (yellow card) 73'; Behich (yellow card) 84'	Stadium: 4 Eylül Stadium; Attendance: 0 Referee: Ali Şansalan

27 February 2021 27	Çaykur Rizespor	0–0	Sivasspor	Rize
16:00 TRT (UTC+3)	Sabo (yellow card) 7'; Pehlivan (yellow card) 40'; Meriah (yellow card) 55'	Report	Yeşilyurt (red card) 32'; Erdal (yellow card) 73'; Kayode (yellow card) 90+3'	Stadium: Yeni Rize Şehir Stadium; Attendance: 0 Referee: Özgür Yankaya

3 March 2021 28	Sivasspor	1–1	Hatayspor	Sivas
16:00 TRT (UTC+3)	Oğuz (yellow card) 48'; Yatabaré 54'; Katranis (yellow card) 68'	Report	Sackey (yellow card) 34'; David (yellow card) 57'; Diouf 59'	Stadium: 4 Eylül Stadium; Attendance: 0 Referee: Mustafa Öğretmenoğlu

7 March 2021 29	Galatasaray	2–2	Sivasspor	Istanbul
19:00 TRT	Falcao 14' 68' (pen.); Belhanda (yellow card) 58'; Muslera (yellow card) 63'; Marcão (yellow card) 63'	Report	Gradel 9' (yellow card) 32' (yellow-red card) 90+6'; Boyd 38'; Yatabaré (yellow card) 43'; Ali (yellow card) 81'; Kayode (yellow card) 90+5'	Stadium: Türk Telekom Stadium; Attendance: 0 Referee: Ali Şansalan; Assistant referees: İbrahim Çağlar Uyarcan, Özgür Ertem; Fourth official: Sarper Barış Saka

13 March 2021 30	Sivasspor	v	Fatih Karagümrük	Sivas
13:30 TRT (UTC+3)		Report		Stadium: Sivas Stadium; Attendance: 0

3 April 2021 32	Sivasspor	0–0	Trabzonspor	Sivas
16:00	Mustapha Yatabaré (yellow card) 34'; Isaac Cofie (yellow card) 46'; Fayçal Fajr (yellow card) 90+5'	Report	Edgar Ié (yellow card) 75'; Abdülkadir Parmak (yellow card) 90+5'	Stadium: Sivas Stadium; Attendance: 0 Referee: Mete Kalkavan; Assistant referees: Ceyhun Sesigüzel, Candaş Elbil; Fourth official: Abdullah Buğra Taşkınsoy

20 April 2021 36	Sivasspor	0–0	Beşiktaş	Sivas
19:00 TRT (UTC+3)	Claudemir (yellow card) 73'	Report	Welinton (yellow card) 49'; Vida (yellow card) 89'; De Souza (yellow card) 90+8'	Stadium: Sivas Stadium; Attendance: 0 Referee: Fırat Aydınus

8 May 2021 40	Sivasspor	0–0	İstanbul Başakşehir	Sivas
20:30 TRT (UTC+3)		Report	Aleksić (yellow card) 45'; Ciğerci (yellow card) 69'	Stadium: Sivas Stadium; Attendance: 0 Referee: Ali Palabıyık

11 May 2021 41	Fenerbahçe	1–2	Sivasspor	Istanbul
20:30	Gönül (yellow card) 90'; Cissé 90+2'	Report	Ninga (yellow card) 37'; Kayode 45+1'; Çiftçi (yellow card) 45+1'; Arslan 48'; Yalçın (yellow card) 59'	Stadium: Şükrü Saracoğlu Stadium; Attendance: 0 Referee: Halis Özkahya; Assistant referees: Volkan Ahmet Narinç, Hakan Yemişken; Fourth official: Mert Güzenge

=== Turkish Cup ===
17 December 2020 Fifth round	Sivasspor	1–0	Giresunspor	Sivas
17:00 TRT (UTC+3)	Kayode 90+2'			Stadium: New Sivas 4 Eylül Stadium

12 January 2021 Round of 16	Sivasspor	2–1 (a.e.t.)	Adana Demirspor	Sivas
18:45 TRT (UTC+3)	Öztekin 37'; Yatabare 116'		Akgün 44'	Stadium: New Sivas 4 Eylül Stadium

11 February 2021 Quarter-finals	Sivasspor	0–1	Antalyaspor	Sivas
17:45 TRT (UTC+3)		Report	Fredy 62' (pen.)	Stadium: New Sivas 4 Eylül Stadium

=== UEFA Europa League ===
==== Group stage ====
The group stage draw was held on 2 October 2020.

Pos	Team	Pld	W	D	L	GF	GA	GD	Pts	Qualification	VIL	MTA	SIV	QRB
1	(Spain) Villarreal	6	5	1	0	17	5	+12	16	Advance to knockout phase	—	4–0	5–3	3–0 (Note: The Villarreal v Qarabağ match was awarded as a 3–0 win to Villarreal after being cancelled as several players of the Qarabağ squad tested positive for the SARS-CoV-2.)
2	(Israel) Maccabi Tel Aviv	6	3	2	1	6	7	−1	11	Advance to knockout phase	1–1	—	1–0	1–0
3	(Turkey) Sivasspor	6	2	0	4	9	11	−2	6		0–1	1–2	—	2–0
4	(Azerbaijan) Qarabağ	6	0	1	5	4	13	−9	1		1–3	1–1	2–3	—

Source: UEFA
Rules for classification: Group stage tiebreakers
Notes:

22 October 2020 1	Villarreal (Spain)	5–3	(Turkey) Sivasspor	Villarreal, Spain
21:00 CEST (UTC+2)	Kubo 13'; Bacca 20'; Foyth 57', (yellow card) 63'; Coquelin (yellow card) 61'; Alcácer 74', 78'; Pedraza (yellow card) 87'	Report	Kayode 33'; Yalçın (yellow card) 34'; Yatabaré 43'; Gradel 64', (yellow card) 75'; Cofie (yellow card) 69'	Stadium: Estadio de la Cerámica; Referee: Serhiy Boyko (Ukraine)

29 October 2020 2	Sivasspor (Turkey)	1–2	(Israel) Maccabi Tel Aviv	Sivas, Turkey
18:55 CET (UTC+1)	Kayode 55'	Report	Biton 69' (pen.); Peretz 74'	Stadium: New Sivas 4 Eylül Stadium; Referee: Irfan Peljto (Bosnia and Herzegovina)

5 November 2020 3	Sivasspor (Turkey)	2–0	(Azerbaijan) Qarabağ	Sivas, Turkey
18:55 CET (UTC+1)	Osmanpaşa 11'; Fajr (yellow card) 63'; Kayode 88'	Report	Ozobić (yellow card) 53'; Kwabena (yellow card) 90+1'	Stadium: New Sivas 4 Eylül Stadium; Referee: Sandro Schärer (Switzerland)

26 November 2020 4	Qarabağ (Azerbaijan)	2–3	(Turkey) Sivasspor	Istanbul, Turkey
18:55 CET (UTC+1)	Zoubir 8'; Garayev (yellow card) 40'; Matić 51'; Owusu (yellow card) 58'	Report	Samassa (yellow card) 9'; Koné 40' (pen.), 79'; Kayode 58'; Goiano (yellow card) 62'; Öztekin (yellow card) 90+2'	Stadium: Başakşehir Fatih Terim Stadium; Referee: Jakob Kehlet (Denmark)

3 December 2020 5	Sivasspor (Turkey)	0–1	(Spain) Villarreal	Sivas, Turkey
18:55 CET (UTC+1)	Fajr (yellow card) 60'; Appindangoyé (yellow card) 79'	Report	Peña (yellow card) 61'; Chukwueze 75'	Stadium: New Sivas 4 Eylül Stadium; Referee: Duje Strukan (Croatia)

10 December 2020 6	Maccabi Tel Aviv (Israel)	1–0	(Turkey) Sivasspor	Tel Aviv, Israel
21:00 CET (UTC+1)	Tibi (yellow card) 53'; Saborit 67'; Rikan (yellow card) 77'; Daniel (yellow card) 90+4'	Report	Fajr (yellow card) 77'; Appindangoyé (yellow card) 78'; Koné (yellow card) 79'; Gradel (yellow card) 86'; Yatabaré (yellow card) 90+1'	Stadium: Bloomfield Stadium; Referee: Andris Treimanis (Latvia)

== Statistics ==
=== Goalscorers ===
Rank	No.	Pos	Nat	Name	Süper Lig	Turkish Cup	Europa League	Total
1	9	FW	(Mali)	Mustapha Yatabaré	10	1	1	12
2	7	MF	(Ivory Coast)	Max Gradel	10	0	1	11
3	80	FW	(Nigeria)	Olarenwaju Kayode	5	1	4	10
4	37	MF	(Turkey)	Hakan Arslan	7	0	0	7
5	37	MF	(United States)	Tyler Boyd	5	0	0	5
6	76	MF	(Morocco)	Fayçal Fajr	4	0	0	4
7	2	FW	(Ivory Coast)	Arouna Koné	1	0	2	3
7	17	MF	(Germany)	Erdoğan Yeşilyurt	3	0	0	3
9	11	FW	(Spain)	Jorge Félix	2	0	0	2
9	88	DF	(Turkey)	Caner Osmanpaşa	1	0	1	2
11	8	MF	(Germany)	Robin Yalçın	1	0	0	1
11	30	MF	(Turkey)	Yasin Öztekin	0	1	0	1
11	58	DF	(Turkey)	Ziya Erdal	1	0	0	1
Own goals					2	0	0	2
Totals					52	3	9	64

Last updated: 11 May 2021

=== Clean sheets ===
Rank	No.	Pos	Nat	Name	Süper Lig	Turkish Cup	Europa League	Total
1	35	GK	(Turkey)	Ali Şaşal Vural	7	1	0	8
2	30	GK	(Mali)	Mamadou Samassa	3	0	1	4
3	25	GK	(Turkey)	Muammer Yıldırım	2	0	0	2
Totals					12	1	1	14

Last updated: 11 May 2021
