= Georges Akieremy =

Gabonese football striker (born 1983)

Personal information
- Full name: George Akiremy Owondo
- Date of birth: 15 September 1983 (age 43)
- Place of birth: Gabon
- Height: 1.74 m (5 ft 9 in)
- Position: Striker

Senior career*
Years	Team	Apps	(Gls)
2003	Tout Puissant Akwembe		
2004–2005	GD Interclube		
2006–2007	Sogéa FC		
2007–2010	Dinamo Tbilisi	53	(22)
2010–2011	Ironi Ramat HaSharon	25	(6)
2011–2012	Sektzia Nes Tziona	28	(8)
2012–2014	AC Bongoville		

International career
2004–2008	Gabon	12	(8)
- * Club domestic league appearances and goals

Georges Akieremy Owondo (born 15 September 1983 in Gabon) is a retired Gabonese football striker.

== International career ==
Akiremy is a member of the Gabon national football team. He scored a goal against Madagascar in an African Nations Cup qualifier on 17 June 2007.

=== International goals ===
Scores and results list Gabon's goal tally first.

No.	Date	Venue	Opponent	Score	Result	Competition
1.	5 September 2004	May 19, 1956 Stadium, Annaba, Algeria	Algeria	2–0	3–0	2006 FIFA World Cup qualification
2.	14 March 2006	Estadio La Libertad, Bata, Equatorial Guinea	Chad	1–2	2–2 (7–6 p)	2006 CEMAC Cup
3.	14 March 2006	Estadio La Libertad, Bata, Equatorial Guinea	Chad	2–2	2–2 (7–6 p)	2006 CEMAC Cup
4.	7 March 2007	Stade Omnisports Idriss Mahamat Ouya, N'Djamena, Chad	Congo	1–1	2–2	2007 CEMAC Cup
5.	9 March 2007	Stade Omnisports Idriss Mahamat Ouya, N'Djamena, Chad	Equatorial Guinea	1–0	1–1	2007 CEMAC Cup
6.	11 March 2011	Stade Idriss Mahamat Ouya, N'Djamena, Chad	Chad	1–0	2–1	2007 CEMAC Cup
7.	11 March 2011	Stade Idriss Mahamat Ouya, N'Djamena, Chad	Chad	2–0	2–1	2007 CEMAC Cup
8.	17 June 2007	Stade Municipal de Mahamasima, Antananarivo, Madagascar	Madagascar	1–0	2–0	2008 Africa Cup of Nations qualification

== Honours ==
- Georgian League
  - 2007–08
- Georgian Super Cup
  - 2008
- Liga Leumit
  - 2010–11
- Toto Cup Leumit
  - 2010–11
