= Léonard Nseké =

Cameroonian football manager (1939–2017)

Personal information
- Date of birth: 17 July 1939 (age 87)
- Place of birth: Souza, Cameroon
- Date of death: 16 October 2017 (aged 78)
- Place of death: Douala, Cameroon
- Position: Midfielder

Senior career*
Years	Team	Apps	(Gls)
- Diamant Yaoundé

International career
1960–1967	Cameroon		

Managerial career
- 1994: Cameroon
- * Club domestic league appearances and goals

Léonard Nseké (17 July 1939 - 16 October 2017) was a Cameroonian football manager and footballer.

== Life and career ==
He was born on 17 July 1939 in Souza, Cameroon. He operated as a midfielder. He was two-footed. He played for Diamant Yaoundé. He was a Cameroon international. He played for the Cameroon national football team from 1960 to 1967. He captained the team. He attended the National Institute of Youth and Sports. After that, he attended the National Institute of Sports in France. He became the first Cameroonian managers to obtain the FIFA-CAF License.

After that, he was appointed as an assistant manager of the Cameroon national football team. In 1994, he was appointed manager of the Cameroon national football team. He helped the team achieve qualification for the 1994 FIFA World Cup. He died on 26 October 2017 in Douala, Cameroon. He was described as "author of the Nséké Method, a personal strategy for athletic development and football techniques, [which] he felt he had the privilege of putting it into practice without filter".
