= 2005 CEMAC Cup =

Tournament details
- Host country: Gabon
- Teams: 6 (from 1 confederation)

Final positions
- Champions: Cameroon (2nd title)
- Runners-up: Chad
- Third place: Gabon

Tournament statistics
- Matches played: 10
- Goals scored: 20 (2 per match)
- Top scorer: (Gabon) Rene Nsi-Akoue (3)

The 2005 CEMAC Cup was the second edition of the CEMAC Cup, the football championship of Central African nations

The tournament was held in the Libreville, Gabon.

== First round ==
=== Group A ===
Team	Pts	Pld	W	D	L	GF	GA
Gabon	6	2	2	0	0	5	0
Congo	3	2	1	0	1	1	1
Central African Republic	0	2	0	0	2	0	5

Feb 3, 2005	Gabon	4–0	Central African Republic
Feb 6, 2005	Central African Republic	0–1	Congo
Feb 8, 2005	Gabon	1–0	Congo

=== Group B ===
Team	Pts	Pld	W	D	L	GF	GA
Cameroon	4	2	1	1	0	4	1
Chad	2	2	0	2	0	1	1
Equatorial Guinea	1	2	0	1	1	0	3

Feb 3, 2005	(Amateur team) Cameroon	1–1	Chad
Feb 5, 2005	(Amateur team) Cameroon	3–0	Equatorial Guinea
Feb 8, 2005	Equatorial Guinea	0–0	Chad

== Knockout stage ==
Chad reached the final after beating hosts Gabon 3-2. The first goal was scored by Hamtouin Djenet (3'), Gaiüs Doumde added the second (10'), while Cyprien Nguembaye added the third (66'). Scorers for Gabon were René Nsi Akoué (6', pen.) and Serge Mabiala (68'). Cameroon beat Congo 4-3 after penalties shootout. The match had tied 0-0 at the end of full time.

=== Semi-finals ===
Feb 10, 2005	Gabon	2–3	Chad
Feb 10, 2005	(Amateur team) Cameroon	0–0 (aet)	Congo
		(4–3 pen)

== 3rd Place Playoff ==
Feb 12, 2005	Gabon	2–1	Congo

== Final ==
Feb 12, 2005	Chad	0–1	Cameroon (Amateur team)

2005 CEMAC Cup

Cameroon
Second title
