= UDEAC Cup =

- Founded: 1984
- Region: UNIFFAC
- Most championships: Cameroon (4)

The Central African Customs and Economic Union (UDEAC) Cup was an association football tournament contested between countries in Central Africa. The creation of the UDEAC Cup was to mark the 20th anniversary since the formation of the Union but it was considered successful and was played a further six times. The tournament open to the national teams of the Union’s member countries who were affiliated to FIFA.

The technical organisation of the tournament was entrusted to the Organising and Regulations Committee of the Central African Football Federations' Union (UNIFFAC).

After the 1990 edition, the tournament was not played in the next decade. In 2003, the same countries decided to revive the competition under another name, the CEMAC Cup.

== General statistics ==
Year	Host	Final			Third Place Match
Year	Host	Champion	Score	Second Place	Third Place	Score	Fourth Place
1984; Details	Congo	Cameroon	2 - 2 (5-4 pk)	Congo	Central African Republic	2 - 2 (8-7 pk)	Gabon
1985; Details	Gabon	Gabon	3 - 0	Congo	Cameroon	2 - 1	Chad
1986; Details	Equatorial Guinea	Cameroon	4 - 1	Chad	Congo		Gabon
1987; Details	Chad	Cameroon	1 - 0	Chad	Gabon	0 - 0 (4 - 3 pk)	Equatorial Guinea
1988; Details	Cameroon	Gabon	1 - 0	Cameroon	Congo	3 - 0	Central African Republic
1989; Details	Central African Republic	Cameroon	2 - 1	Central African Republic	Gabon	2 - 0	Chad
1990; Details	Congo	Congo	2 - 1	Cameroon	Chad	2 - 1	Gabon

=== Winners by country ===
Wins	Nation	Year(s)
4 times	Cameroon	1984, 1986, 1987, 1989
2 times	Gabon	1985, 1988
1 time	Congo	1990

== 1984 UDEAC Cup ==
Played in Congo.

=== Group A ===
Team	Pts	Pld	W	D	L	GF	GA
Congo	4	2	2	0	0	7	1
Central African Republic	1	2	0	1	1	2	3
Equatorial Guinea	1	2	0	1	1	1	6

Dec 9, 1984	Congo	5–0	Equatorial Guinea
Dec 12, 1984	Congo	2–1	Central African Republic
Dec 14, 1984	Central African Republic	1–1	Equatorial Guinea

=== Group B ===
Team	Pts	Pld	W	D	L	GF	GA
Cameroon	3	2	1	1	0	2	0
Gabon	2	2	0	2	0	3	3
Chad	1	2	0	1	1	3	5

Dec 10, 1984	Cameroon	2–0	Chad
Dec 12, 1984	Chad	3–3	Gabon
Dec 14, 1984	Cameroon	0–0	Gabon

=== Fifth place match ===
Dec 16, 1984

Chad	1–1	Equatorial Guinea
Penalties
	3–2

=== Semi-finals ===
Dec 17, 1984

Congo	3–0	Gabon

Dec 17, 1984

Cameroon	7–1	Central African Republic

=== Third place match ===
Dec 19, 1984

Gabon	2–2	Central African Republic
Penalties
	7–8

=== Final ===
Dec 20, 1984

Cameroon	2–2	Congo
Penalties
	5–4

== 1985 UDEAC Cup ==
Played in Gabon.

=== Group A ===
Team	Pts	Pld	W	D	L	GF	GA
Gabon	4	2	2	0	0	5	0
Congo	2	2	1	0	1	4	2
Central African Republic	0	2	0	0	2	1	8

Dec 7, 1985	Gabon	1–0	Congo
Dec 9, 1985	Congo	4–1	Central African Republic
Dec 11, 1985	Gabon	4–0	Central African Republic

=== Group B ===
Team	Pts	Pld	W	D	L	GF	GA
Cameroon	3	2	1	1	0	4	2
Chad	2	2	1	0	1	3	3
Equatorial Guinea	1	2	0	1	1	1	5

Dec 8, 1985	Cameroon	2–0	Equatorial Guinea
Dec 10, 1985	Chad	1–1	Equatorial Guinea
Dec 12, 1985	Chad	2–2	Cameroon

=== Semi-finals ===
Dec 14, 1985

Gabon	3–0	Chad

Dec 15, 1985

Cameroon	0–1	Congo

=== Third place match ===
Dec 18, 1985

Cameroon	2–1	Chad

=== Final ===
Dec 19, 1985

Gabon	3–0	Congo

== 1986 UDEAC Cup ==
Played in Equatorial Guinea (Bata and Malabo).

=== Group A ===
Team	Pts	Pld	W	D	L	GF	GA
Cameroon	4	2	2	0	0	5	1
Chad	2	2	1	0	1	2	3
Equatorial Guinea	0	2	0	0	2	0	3

Dec 9, 1986	Cameroon	2–0	Equatorial Guinea
Dec 11, 1986	Cameroon	3–1	Chad
Dec 13, 1986	Chad	1–0	Equatorial Guinea

=== Group B ===
Team	Pts	Pld	W	D	L	GF	GA
Gabon	4	2	2	0	0	2	0
Congo	2	2	1	0	1	3	2
Central African Republic	0	2	0	0	2	1	4

Dec 10, 1986	Gabon	1–0	Congo
Dec 12, 1986	Congo	3–1	Central African Republic
Dec 14, 1986	Gabon	1–0	Central African Republic

=== Semi-finals ===
Dec 16, 1986

Cameroon	1–0	Congo

Dec 17, 1986

Chad	0–0	Gabon
Penalties
	4–1

=== Third place match ===
This match between Congo and Gabon was not played as Gabon withdrew.

=== Final ===
Dec 19, 1986

Cameroon	4–1	Chad

== 1987 UDEAC Cup ==
Played in N'Djamena, Chad.

=== Group A ===
Team	Pts	Pld	W	D	L	GF	GA
Chad	3	2	1	1	0	3	2
Gabon	2	2	0	2	0	2	2
Central African Republic	1	2	0	1	1	2	3

Dec 7, 1987	Chad	2–1	Central African Republic
Dec 9, 1987	Central African Republic	1–1	Gabon
Dec 11, 1987	Chad	1–1	Gabon

=== Group B ===
Team	Pts	Pld	W	D	L	GF	GA
Cameroon	3	2	1	1	0	1	0
Equatorial Guinea	1	2	0	1	1	0	1
Congo	withdrew						

Dec 8, 1987	Cameroon	1–0	Equatorial Guinea
Dec 10, 1987	Equatorial Guinea	0–0	Cameroon

=== Semi-finals ===
Dec 15, 1987

Chad	4–0	Equatorial Guinea

Dec 16, 1987

Cameroon	1–0	Gabon
M'Fédé

=== Third place match ===
Dec 18, 1987

Gabon	0–0	Equatorial Guinea
Penalties
	4–3

=== Final ===
Dec 18, 1987

Cameroon	1–0	Chad

== 1988 UDEAC Cup ==
Played in Cameroon.

=== Group A ===
Team	Pts	Pld	W	D	L	GF	GA
Gabon	3	2	1	1	0	3	0
Cameroon	3	2	1	1	0	2	1
Equatorial Guinea	0	2	0	0	2	1	5

Nov 31, 1988	Cameroon	0–0	Gabon
Dec 2, 1988	Cameroon	2–1	Equatorial Guinea
Dec 4, 1988	Gabon	3–0	Equatorial Guinea

=== Group B ===
Team	Pts	Pld	W	D	L	GF	GA
Congo	4	2	2	0	0	3	1
Central African Republic	2	2	1	0	1	2	2
Chad	0	2	0	0	2	2	4

Nov 30, 1988	Congo	2–1	Chad
Dec 2, 1988	Central African Republic	2–1	Chad
Dec 4, 1988	Congo	1–0	Central African Republic

=== Semi-finals ===
Dec 6, 1988

Cameroon	2–0	Congo
M'Fédé

Dec 6, 1988

Gabon	0–0	Central African Republic
Penalties
	4–3

=== Third place match ===
Dec 8, 1988

Congo	3–0	Central African Republic

=== Final ===
Dec 8, 1988

Cameroon	0–1	Gabon

== 1989 UDEAC Cup ==
Played in Bangui, Central African Republic.

=== Group A ===
Team	Pts	Pld	W	D	L	GF	GA
Gabon	2	2	1	0	1	2	1
Congo	2	2	1	0	1	1	2

Dec 3, 1989	Congo	1–0	Gabon
Dec 5, 1988	Gabon	2–0	Congo

=== Group B ===
Team	Pts	Pld	W	D	L	GF	GA
Cameroon	4	2	2	0	0	3	1
Central African Republic	1	2	0	1	1	2	3
Chad	1	2	0	1	1	1	2

Dec 2, 1989	Central African Republic	1–1	Chad
Dec 4, 1989	Central African Republic	1–2	Cameroon
Dec 6, 1989	Cameroon	1–0	Chad

=== Playoff for the semifinal place ===
Dec 8, 1989	Chad	2–1	Congo

=== Semi-finals ===
Dec 10, 1989

Central African Republic	2–0	Gabon

Dec 11, 1989

Cameroon	0–0	Chad
Penalties
	4–3

=== Third place match ===
Dec 12, 1989

Gabon	2–0	Chad

=== Final ===
Dec 13, 1989

Central African Republic	1–2	Cameroon
Goal		Bell

== 1990 UDEAC Cup ==
Played in Congo.

=== Group A ===
Team	Pts	Pld	W	D	L	GF	GA
Congo	4	2	2	0	0	9	0
Chad	2	2	1	0	1	1	3
Equatorial Guinea	0	2	0	0	2	0	7

Dec 8, 1990	Congo	3–0	Chad
Dec 12, 1990	Chad	1–0	Equatorial Guinea
Dec 13, 1990	Congo	6–0	Equatorial Guinea

=== Group B ===
Team	Pts	Pld	W	D	L	GF	GA
Cameroon	4	2	2	0	0	5	1
Gabon	2	2	1	0	1	1	3
Central African Republic	0	2	0	0	2	0	4

Dec 9, 1990	Cameroon	2–1	Gabon
Dec 11, 1990	Gabon	1–0	Central African Republic
Dec 13, 1990	Cameroon	3–0	Central African Republic

=== Semi-finals ===
Dec 15, 1990

Congo	1–0	Gabon

Dec 15, 1990

Cameroon	1–0	Chad

=== Fifth place match ===
Dec 17, 1990

Central African Republic	3–3	Equatorial Guinea
Penalties
	5–4

=== Third place match ===
Dec 17, 1990

Chad	2–1	Gabon

=== Final ===
Dec 18, 1990

Congo	2–1	Cameroon
Anges Ngapy 3'; François Makita 45'		Bertin Ebwellé 54'

== See also ==
- CEMAC Cup
