= Dio (footballer) =

Brazilian footballer (born 1986)

Personal information
- Full name: Diouzer da Cruz dos Santos
- Date of birth: 26 September 1986 (age 40)
- Place of birth: Dom Pedrito, Brazil
- Height: 1.68 m (5 ft 6 in)
- Position: Midfielder

Senior career*
Years	Team	Apps	(Gls)
2004–2007	Cambriú		
2007	Guarani		
2007	Atibaia		
2008	Itapirense		
2009	Coruripe		
2009	→ Red Bull Brasil (loan)		
2010	CRB	8	(1)
2010	Coruripe		
2011	Anapolina	11	(0)
2011	CSA		
2012	Campinense		
2012	Mixto	2	(0)
2012	Gabès	4	(0)
2013	Águia Negra	0	(0)
2013	Quindío	4	(0)
2014–2015	MAS Fez	14	(1)
2016	Sete de Dourados	8	(1)
2017	Bahia de Feira	0	(0)
2018	Rio Preto	0	(0)

International career^{‡}
2013–2014	Equatorial Guinea	6	(1)
- * Club domestic league appearances and goals as of 28 August 2014 ‡ National team caps and goals as of 26 January 2014

Diouzer da Cruz dos Santos (born 26 September 1986), simply known as Dio, is a former professional footballer who played as a midfielder.
