= Saïra Issambet =

Congo Republic footballer

Personal information
- Full name: Saïra Issambet
- Date of birth: 20 January 1998 (age 28)
- Place of birth: Brazzaville, Congo
- Height: 1.75 m (5 ft 9 in)
- Position: Midfielder

Team information
- Current team: Étoile du Congo

Senior career*
Years	Team	Apps	(Gls)
2014	ACNFF		
2014	Ferroviário		
2015–2016	Étoile du Congo		
2016–2017	FUS Rabat	0	(0)
2017–2018	USM Blida	1	(0)
2018	Al-Rustaq		
2019–	Étoile du Congo		

International career^{‡}
2014	Congo	1	(0)
- * Club domestic league appearances and goals as of 1 August 2020 ‡ National team caps and goals as of 1 August 2020

Saïra Issambet (born 20 January 1998) is a Congolese professional footballer who plays as a defensive midfielder.
