= 2008 CEMAC Cup =

Tournament details
- Host country: Cameroon
- Dates: 14 - 24 June
- Teams: 6 (from 1 confederation)

Final positions
- Champions: Cameroon (3rd title)
- Runners-up: Congo
- Third place: Central African Republic

Tournament statistics
- Matches played: 10
- Goals scored: 25 (2.5 per match)

The 2008 CEMAC Cup was the fifth edition of the CEMAC Cup, the football championship of Central African nations.

The tournament was held from 14 June to 26 June in Yaoundé, Cameroon. The tournament was played by 6 teams composed just by players based on local clubs. The first team players active in the 2010 World Cup qualification at the same time were not involved.

== First round ==
=== Group A ===
Team	Pts	Pld	W	D	L	GF	GA
Chad	4	2	1	1	0	4	3
Cameroon	3	2	1	0	1	2	2
Equatorial Guinea	1	2	0	1	1	2	3

June 14, 2008	Cameroon	1–2	Chad
June 16, 2008	Chad	2–2	Equatorial Guinea
June 18, 2008	Cameroon	1–0	Equatorial Guinea

=== Group B ===
Team	Pts	Pld	W	D	L	GF	GA
Central African Republic	4	2	1	1	0	5	3
Congo	3	2	1	0	1	2	3
Gabon	1	2	0	1	1	4	5

June 14, 2008	Congo	2–1	Gabon
June 16, 2008	Gabon	3–3	Central African Republic
June 18, 2008	Central African Republic	2–0	Congo

== Knockout round ==
=== Semi-finals ===
June 20, 2008	Chad	0–1	Congo
June 20, 2008	Central African Republic	0–1	Cameroon

=== 3rd place playoff ===
June 23, 2008	Chad	0–2	Central African Republic

== Final ==
June 24, 2008

Cameroon	3 - 0	Congo
Hervé Boumsong 29'; Eric Yopa 42'; Frédéric Nguimbous 77'

Yaoundé, Cameroon

2008 CEMAC Cup

Cameroon
Third title
