= Ahmed Evariste Medego =

Chadian footballer (born 1982)

Ahmat Evariste Medego
Personal information
- Date of birth: 7 April 1982 (age 44)
- Place of birth: N'Djamena, Chad
- Height: 1.82 m (6 ft 0 in)
- Positions: Striker; midfielder

Senior career*
Years	Team	Apps	(Gls)
2004	Bandja FC		
2005	Sable FC		
2008–2011	AS Mangasport		
2011–2012	Missile FC		
2012–2014	US Oyem		
2015–2018	Gazelle FC		

International career^{‡}
2000–2010	Chad	21	(2)
- * Club domestic league appearances and goals as of 19 June 2018 ‡ National team caps and goals as of 19 June 2018

Ahmed Evariste Medego (born 7 April 1982) is a retired football striker who played for the Chadian national team.

== Career ==
While playing football in Cameroon, Medego was banned for one-year by the Cameroonian Football Federation for registering with two clubs simultaneously (Sable FC and Bandja FC). He moved to Gabon where he played for AS Mangasport. He scored a goal in Mangasport's 2009 CAF Champions League preliminary round upset of DC Motema Pembe. He finished his career in Gazelle FC in the Chad Premier League.

== International career ==
Medego has made 21 appearances for the Chad national football team, and he was a part of qualifying campaign for 2006 and 2010 FIFA World Cup. He played for the side that finished runners-up at the 2005 CEMAC Cup.
