= Destin Makita =

Republic of the Congo footballer

Personal information
- Full name: Fabry Destin Makita-Passy
- Date of birth: October 23, 1984 (age 42)
- Place of birth: Brazzaville, People's Republic of the Congo
- Height: 1.80 m (5 ft 11 in)
- Position: Defender

Youth career
- 1997–2000: Vita Club Makanda

Senior career*
Years	Team	Apps	(Gls)
2001–2003	Vita Club Makanda	54	(7)
2004–2007	Delta Téléstar	82	(9)
2007–2008	Orlando Pirates	20	(1)
2009–2012	AC Léopards	6	(1)
2012	Missile FC		

International career^{‡}
2001–2013	Republic of the Congo	55	(1)
- * Club domestic league appearances and goals as of September 23, 2008 ‡ National team caps and goals as of September 23, 2008

Fabry Destin Makita-Passy (born October 23, 1984) is a football defender who played for the Republic of the Congo national football team and AC Léopards.

== Career ==
Makita played in Republic of the Congo with AC Léopards and Vita Club Makanda.

He previously played for Delta Téléstar in Gabon and Orlando Pirates in the South African Premier Soccer League.

== International career ==
Makita has made several appearances for the Republic of the Congo national football team.
