= Lorry Nkolo =

Congolese footballer

Personal information
- Date of birth: 22 June 1993 (age 33)
- Place of birth: Congo
- Position: Forward

Team information
- Current team: DRB Tadjenanet

Senior career*
Years	Team	Apps	(Gls)
2013–2015	Diables Noirs	-	(-)
2015–	DRB Tadjenanet	1	(1)

International career^{‡}
2013–	Congo	4	(0)
- * Club domestic league appearances and goals as of 00:00, August 16, 2015 (EST) ‡ National team caps and goals as of 00:00, August 16, 2015 (EST)

Lorry Nkolo (born June 22, 1993) is a Congolese professional footballer who plays as a forward for DRB Tadjenanet in the Algerian Ligue Professionnelle 1.

== Club career ==
In the summer of 2015, Nkolo signed a two-year contract with Algerian club DRB Tadjenanet, becoming the club's first ever foreign player.

Captain of his club team, CSM Diables Noirs, Nkolo was a leading goalscorer during the 2021 Congo Premier League season with 10 goals.

== International career ==
In January 2014, coach Claude Leroy, invited him to be a part of the Congo squad for the 2014 African Nations Championship. The team was eliminated in the group stages after losing to Ghana, drawing with Libya and defeating Ethiopia.
