= CEMAC Cup =

Football tournament in Africa

- Organiser(s): UNIFFAC
- Founded: 2003
- Abolished: 2014
- Region: Central Africa
- Teams: 6
- Last champions: Chad (1st time)
- Most championships: Cameroon (3 times)

The CEMAC Cup was a non-commercialised football tournament that included only local league players from the Republic of Congo, Chad, Equatorial Guinea, Cameroon, Gabon and the Central African Republic. As the local leagues in these six countries are amateur leagues, it was a non-professional competition. However, it is a good competition for recruiters who want to sign new talent in European clubs.

These countries have also played seven tournaments before, the UDEAC Cup, from 1984 until 1990. After more than a decade, the same countries decided to revive the competition under another name, the CEMAC Cup.

The tournament is organised by the Central African Football Federations' Union.

== Results ==
Year	Host	Final			Third Place Match		
Year	Host	Champion	Score	Second Place	Third Place	Score	Fourth Place
2003; Details	Congo	Cameroon	3 - 2	Central African Republic	Congo	1 - 0	Gabon
2005; Details	Gabon	Cameroon	1 - 0	Chad	Gabon	2 - 1	Congo
2006; Details	Equatorial Guinea	Equatorial Guinea	1 - 1 (4 - 2 pk)	Cameroon	Gabon	2 - 2 (7 - 6 pk)	Chad
2007; Details	Chad	Congo	1 - 0	Gabon	Chad	1 - 0	Central African Republic
2008; Details	Cameroon	Cameroon	3 - 0	Congo	Central African Republic	2 - 0	Chad
2009; Details	Central African Republic	Central African Republic	3 – 0	Equatorial Guinea	Chad	2 – 1	Gabon
2010; Details	Congo	Congo	1 - 1 (9 - 8 pk)	Cameroon	Central African Republic	3 – 2	Chad
2011	Gabon	Delayed and then Canceled					
2013; Details	Gabon	Gabon	2 - 0	Central African Republic	Congo	2 – 1	Cameroon
2014; Details	Equatorial Guinea	Chad	3 – 2	Congo	Cameroon	0 - 0 (7 - 6 pk)	Equatorial Guinea

== Most CEMAC Cup wins ==
Wins	Nation	Year(s)
3 times	Cameroon	2003, 2005, 2008
2 times	Congo	2007, 2010
1 time	Equatorial Guinea	2006
1 time	Central African Republic	2009
1 time	Chad	2014
1 time	Gabon	2013
