= Amorese Dertin =

Central African Republic footballer

Personal information
- Full name: Amorese Ralph Dertin
- Date of birth: 29 January 1991 (age 35)
- Place of birth: Bangui, Central African Republic
- Height: 1.68 m (5 ft 6 in)
- Position: Midfielder

Team information
- Current team: AS Pélican

Senior career*
Years	Team	Apps	(Gls)
2009–2015	AS Pélican		
2015–2016	Missile FC		
2016–2017	Bamboutos		
2017–2020	SCAF Tocages		
2020–	AS Pélican		

International career^{‡}
2010–	Central African Republic	14	(1)
- * Club domestic league appearances and goals as of 22:37, 1 September 2021 (UTC) ‡ National team caps and goals as of 22:37, 1 September 2021 (UTC)

Amorese Ralph Dertin (born 29 January 1991) is a Central African footballer who plays as a midfielder for AS Pélican and the Central African Republic national team.

== Club career ==
Dertin debuted with the Central African Republic national team in a 3–2 Central African Games win over Chad on 3 October 2010.
