= Bowsher =

Bowsher is a surname. Notable people with the surname include:

- Charles Arthur Bowsher (1931–2022), American businessman and politician
- Dennis Bowsher (born 1983), American modern pentathlete
- Jack Bowsher (1930–2006), American race car driver and car owner
- Stan Bowsher (1899–1968), Welsh professional footballer

== See also ==
- Bosher Club
