= Cameroon national football team =

Men's association football team

Cameroon
- Nickname(s): Les Lions Indomptables (The Indomitable Lions)
- Association: Fédération Camerounaise de Football (FECAFOOT)
- Confederation: CAF (Africa)
- Sub-confederation: UNIFFAC (Central Africa)
- Head coach: David Pagou
- Captain: Christian Bassogog
- Most caps: Rigobert Song (137)
- Top scorer: Samuel Eto'o (56)
- Home stadium: Ahmadou Ahidjo Stadium
- FIFA code: CMR
First colours	Second colours	Third colours

FIFA ranking
- Current: 42 ▲1 (7 October 2026)
- Highest: 11 (November 2006 – January 2007, November – December 2009)
- Lowest: 79 (February – March 2013)

First international
- Belgian Congo 3–2 French Cameroon (Belgian Congo; September 1956)

Biggest win
- Cameroon 9–0 Chad (Kinshasa, DR Congo; 7 April 1965)

Biggest defeat
- South Korea 5–0 Cameroon (Seoul, South Korea; 4 October 1984); Norway 6–1 Cameroon (Oslo, Norway; 31 October 1990); Russia 6–1 Cameroon (Palo Alto, United States; 28 June 1994); Costa Rica 5–0 Cameroon (San José, Costa Rica; 9 March 1997)

World Cup
- Appearances: 8 (first in 1982)
- Best result: Quarter-finals (1990)

Africa Cup of Nations
- Appearances: 22 (first in 1970)
- Best result: Champions (1984, 1988, 2000, 2002, 2017)

African Nations Championship
- Appearances: 4 (first in 2011)
- Best result: Fourth place (2020)

Confederations Cup
- Appearances: 3 (first in 2001)
- Best result: Runners-up (2003)

The Cameroon national football team (French: Équipe du Cameroun de football), also known as the Indomitable Lions (French: les lions indomptables), (Note: Most of the national sporting teams in Cameroon go by this name, including the Cameroon national rugby league team.) represents Cameroon in men's international football. It is controlled by the Fédération Camerounaise de Football, a member of FIFA and its African confederation CAF.

The team has qualified for the FIFA World Cup eight times, more than any other African team, and four times in a row between 1990 and 2002. However, the team has only made it out of the group stage once. They were the first African team to reach the quarter-final of the World Cup in 1990, losing to England in extra time. They have also won five Africa Cup of Nations.

Cameroon is the first and, as of 2022, only African country to win against Brazil in tournament play, defeating them in the 2003 Confederations Cup and 2022 FIFA World Cup by identical 1–0 scores.

== History ==
=== 1956–2000: early years ===
Cameroon played its first match against Belgian Congo in 1956, losing 3–2. They first qualified for the Africa Cup of Nations in 1970, but were knocked out in the first round. Two years later, as hosts, the Indomitable Lions finished third after being knocked out by their neighbors and future champions Congo in the 1972 Africa Cup of Nations. They would not qualify for the competition for another ten years.

Cameroon qualified for its first FIFA World Cup in 1982. With the increase from 16 teams to 24, Cameroon qualified along with Algeria to represent Africa at the tournament in Spain. Cameroon was drawn into Group 1 with Italy, Poland, and Peru. In their first game, Cameroon faced Peru and drew 0–0. They then held Poland goalless before a surprise 1–1 draw with eventual winners Italy. Despite being unbeaten, they failed to qualify for the second round, having scored fewer goals than Italy.

Two years later, Cameroon qualified for the 1984 Africa Cup of Nations, held in Ivory Coast. They finished second in their first-round group before beating Algeria on penalties in the semi-final. In the final, Cameroon beat Nigeria 3–1 with goals from René N'Djeya, Théophile Abega, and Ernest Ebongué to become champions of Africa for the first time.

Cameroon qualified for the 1990 World Cup by surpassing Nigeria and beating Tunisia in the final round playoff. In the final tournament, Cameroon were drawn into Group B with Argentina, Romania and the Soviet Union. Cameroon defeated defending champions Argentina in the opening game 1–0 with a goal scored by François Omam-Biyik. Cameroon later defeated Romania 2–1 and lost to the Soviet Union 0–4, becoming the first side to top a World Cup Finals group with a negative goal difference. In the second round, Cameroon defeated Colombia 2–1 with the 38-year-old Roger Milla scoring two goals in extra-time.

In the quarter-finals, Cameroon faced England. After 25 minutes, England's David Platt scored for England, while in the second-half, Cameroon came back with a 61st-minute penalty from Emmanuel Kundé and took the lead with Eugène Ekéké on 65 minutes. England, however, equalized in the 83rd minute with a penalty from Gary Lineker, while Lineker again found the net via a 105th-minute penalty to make the eventual scoreline 3–2 for England. The team was coached by Russian manager and former player Valeri Nepomniachi.

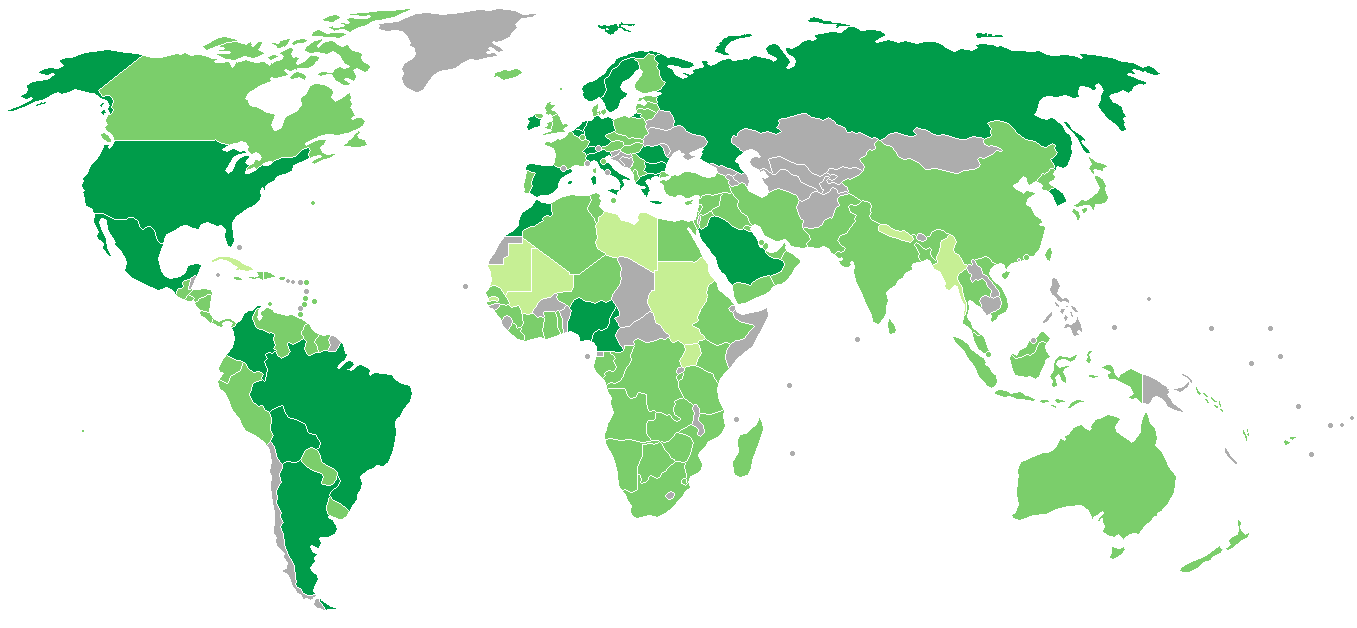
Countries qualified for the 1994 FIFA World Cup are shown in dark green

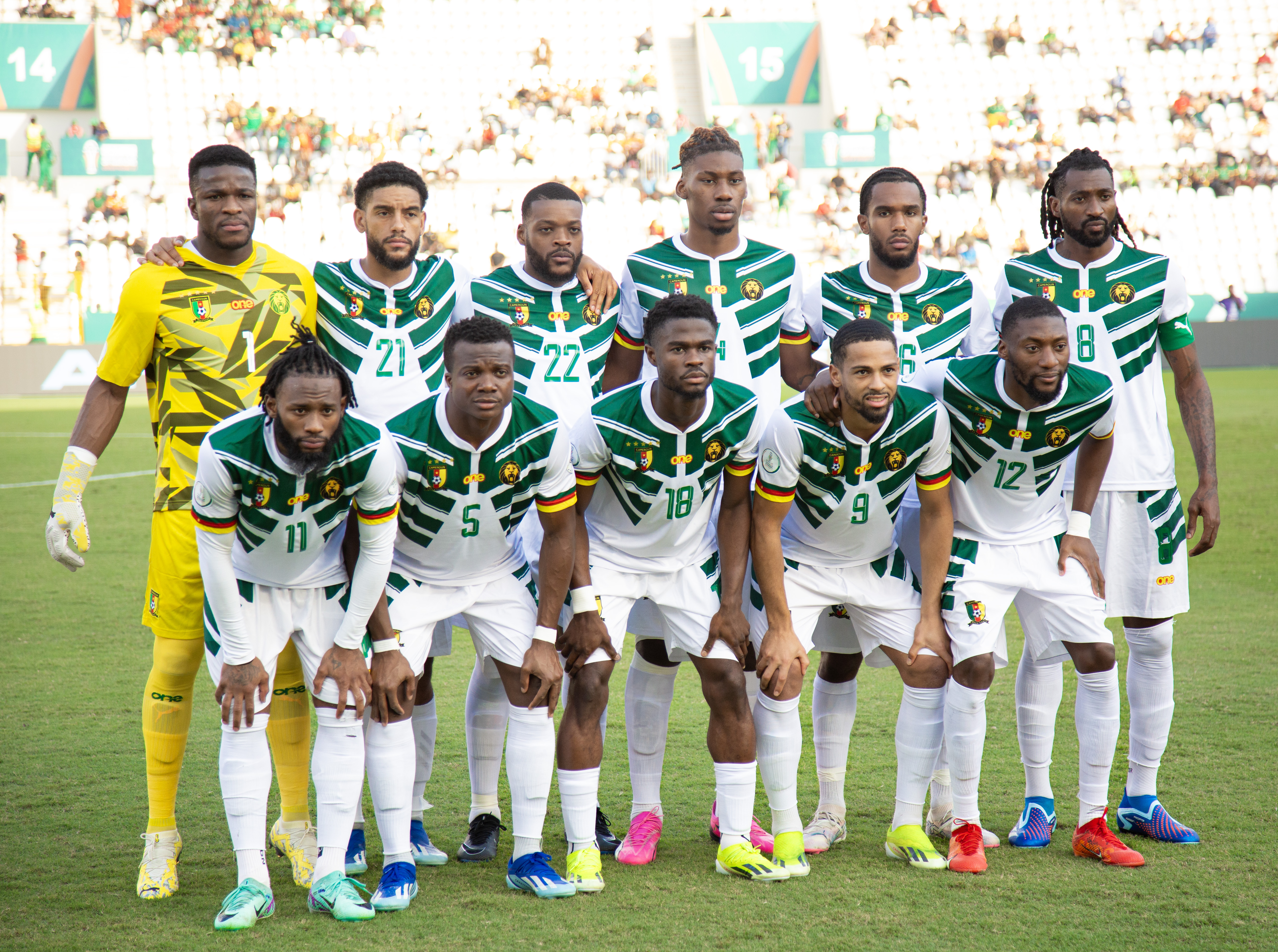
The national football team of Cameroon

The 1994 World Cup in the United States saw the adjustment of representation for African teams qualifying, from two to three. Cameroon qualified along with Nigeria and Morocco. In the final tournament, Cameroon were drawn into Group B with Sweden, Brazil and Russia. After a 2–2 draw against Sweden, Cameroon lost to Brazil and Russia sealed their elimination. In their last game against Russia, the then 42-year-old Roger Milla became the oldest player to play and score in a World Cup finals match. The team was coached by French-born Henri Michel. The 1998 World Cup in France saw an increase of 24 to 32 teams, with Cameroon one of the five countries representing Africa. Cameroon were drawn into Group B with Italy, Chile and Austria. Despite drawing with Chile and Austria (after leading 1–0 against them until the 90th minute), a 3–0 defeat to Italy saw Cameroon finish bottom of the group. Cameroon had three players sent off in the course of the tournament, more than any other team. They also had the highest card count per game of any team, collecting an average of four bookings in each match they played. It was also during this tournament that a certain Samuel Eto'o was exposed to Cameroonians. He was the youngest player of the tournament alongside Michael Owen of England. The team was coached by French-born Claude Le Roy.

=== Post-2000 ===
Cameroon qualified for the 2002 World Cup in Korea-Japan, clinching first place in their group which included Angola, Zambia and Togo. Cameroon were drawn into Group E alongside Germany, the Republic of Ireland and Saudi Arabia. Cameroon started with a 1–1 draw with Ireland after giving up the lead and later defeated Saudi Arabia 1–0. In their last game, Cameroon were defeated 2–0 by Germany and were narrowly eliminated by the Irish, who had not lost a game.

Cameroon started the 2002 African Cup of Nations competition with a 1–0 win over DR Congo. That was followed by another 1–0 win against Ivory Coast, and a comfortable 3–0 win against Togo. These results led Cameroon to qualify from the group stage to the quarter-finals as their group's winner. In the knockout stage, M'Boma's goal in the 62nd minute lifted Cameroon over Egypt 1–0. Cameroon would defeat hosts Mali 3–0 in the semi-final on 7 February on route to repeating as champions by edging Senegal 3–2 on penalties following a scoreless 120 minutes on 13 February, and thereby qualifying for the 2003 Confederations Cup in France.

There, the Indomitable Lions became the first African country to defeat Brazil, courtesy of Samuel Eto'o's tally in the 83rd minute of their opening match on 13 June. Cameroon subsequently defeated Turkey and drew the USA before dispatching Colombia in the semi-final. However, the latter was overshadowed by the sudden on-field collapse of Cameroon midfielder Marc-Vivien Foé in the 71st minute. Medics spent 45 minutes attempting to restart his heart, and although he was still alive upon arrival at the stadium's medical centre, he died shortly afterwards. An autopsy determined the cause of death to have been hypertrophic cardiomyopathy, a hereditary condition known to increase the risk of sudden death during physical exercise. The Final on June 29 against France, consequently, became not about the game but rather an occasion for both teams and fans to honor Foé. France prevailed 1–0 following Thierry Henry's golden goal in the 7th minute of extra time, but abstained from traditional post-match celebrations. Instead, the tournament closed with one last tribute to Foé as Cameroon took a lap around the stadium holding a large photo of their fallen teammate.

In the 2006 World Cup qualifying round, Cameroon were drawn into Group 3 with the Ivory Coast, Egypt, Libya, Sudan and Benin. Cameroon led the group until their final game, when Pierre Womé failed to convert a late penalty. On 8 October 2005, Cameroon drew with Egypt 1–1 while eventual World Cup debutants Ivory Coast defeated Sudan 3–1, preventing Cameroon from travelling to Germany.

In Cameroon's 2010 World Cup qualifying campaign, the team was grouped with Gabon, Togo and Morocco. After a slow start in their campaign with a loss to Togo, the coach of Cameroon, Otto Pfister, resigned. Frenchman Paul Le Guen was appointed as the new coach after a draw against Morocco. Le Guen's appointment caused an uprise in Cameroon's spirits as they earned a win against Gabon in Libreville, followed by another win against the Panthers four days later in Yaoundé. One month later, they defeated Togo in Yaoundé by three goals. On 14 November 2009, Cameroon defeated the Atlas Lions of Morocco 2–0 in Fez in their last match of their campaign. Gabon was also defeated by Togo 1–0 in Lomé. Both results caused Cameroon to qualify for the 2010 World Cup finals, held in South Africa.

The Indomitable Lions were the first team to be mathematically eliminated in the 2010 World Cup, going out in their second group match to Denmark after losing 1–2, preceded by a 0–1 defeat to Japan.

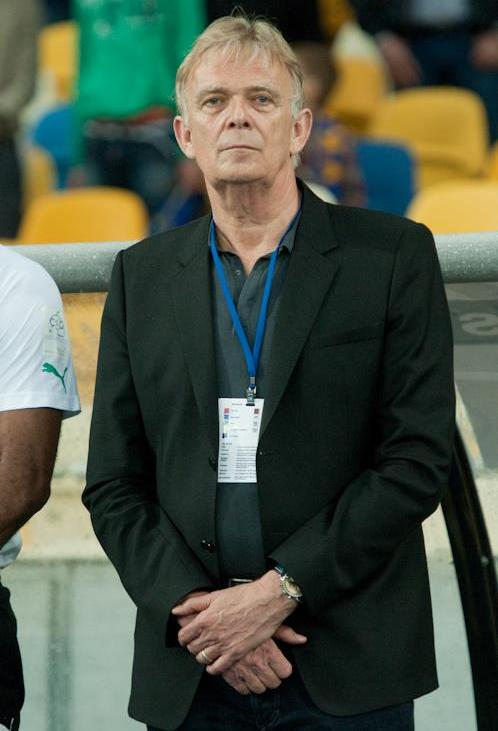
Between 2013 and 2015, Volker Finke was the manager of the national football team of Cameroon.

Cameroon started the 2017 Africa Cup of Nations competition with a 1–1 draw to Burkina Faso, followed by a 2–1 win against Guinea-Bissau, and an unconvincing goalless draw against the hosts Gabon. These results were enough for Cameroon to qualify from the group stage to the quarter-finals, where they met Senegal in a close match that Cameroon won 5–4 in a penalty shootout after it had ended goalless in extra time. In the semi-finals, Cameroon met Ghana and won the match 2–0 to qualify to the final.

On 5 February 2017, and after a close match, Cameroon won the African Cup of Nations for the fifth time after defeating seven-time champions Egypt 2–1 in the final, by Vincent Aboubakar's late goal in the 89th minute of the match. As champions, Cameroon qualified for the 2017 FIFA Confederations Cup in Russia, where they were eliminated in the group stage.

Cameroon qualified for the 2022 World Cup in Qatar via the away goals rule after defeating hosts Algeria 2–1 on 29 March 2022 thanks to Karl Toko Ekambi's winner in the 124th minute of the second leg of their CAF third round home-and-away tie with The Fennec Foxes. On 2 December 2022, in the final match of Group G, The Indomitable Lions made history by becoming the first African country to defeat Brazil at the World Cup. Vincent Aboubakar netted the contest's lone goal in the 2nd minute of stoppage time, and subsequently received his second booking and dismissal for removing his shirt during his celebration. It was the Seleção's first group stage loss since a 2–1 defeat to Norway in 1998 and Cameroon's first ever World Cup win since 2002. Cameroon failed to advance from their group, however, as they finished third behind Brazil and Switzerland, respectively.

After the dramatic qualification process for the previous World Cup, the Indomitable Lions of Cameroon had to wait until the last day to secure their ticket for the AFCON 2023 (scheduled to be played in January 2024) in Ivory Coast. Despite a relatively favorable draw for the qualifiers, which included Namibia, Burundi, and Kenya (the latter eliminated due to administrative interference), the Cameroonian team faced significant challenges. They struggled against the modest Namibian team, managing a 1–1 draw in Yaoundé and then suffering a 2–1 loss in South Africa. After securing a 1–0 victory over Burundi in the first leg, they needed to confirm their qualification in the second leg to avoid missing out on the continent's most prestigious competition, which would have meant watching it at home. In a packed Roumde Adja stadium on Tuesday, September 12, the Indomitable Lions secured their spot in the AFCON 2024 thanks to goals from Bryan Mbeumo (46'), Christopher Wooh (59'), and Vincent Aboubakar (90+3').

Cameroon ended up failing to qualify for the 2026 FIFA World Cup after a last-minute goal from Chancel Mbemba of the DR Congo in the 2026 FIFA World Cup qualification – CAF second round, meaning the Indomitable Lions would miss their fourth World Cup since 1982.

== Kits and crests ==
The Cameroon national football team's tradition color is green shirts, red shorts and yellow socks, colors of the national flag.

=== Kit controversies ===
Cameroon used sleeveless Puma shirts at the 2002 African Cup of Nations in Mali, which they won for the fourth time. FIFA, however, did not allow Cameroon to use the same kits as at the 2002 World Cup, and black sleeves were added to the shirts. The 2004 African Cup of Nations witnessed Cameroon again run into controversy regarding their kits. Puma had designed a one-piece kit for the Cameroon team which FIFA declared illegal, stating that the kits must have separate shirts and shorts. FIFA then imposed fines on Cameroon and deducted six points from their qualifying campaign. Puma argued that a two-piece kit is not stated as a requirement in the FIFA laws of the game. Puma, however, lost the case in court, and Cameroon were forced to wear two-piece kits, but FIFA subsequently restored the six qualifying points to Cameroon.

=== Kit suppliers ===
Kit supplier	Period	Notes
(France) Le Coq Sportif	1982–1987	
(Germany) Adidas	1988–1993	
(United Kingdom) Mitre	1993–1995	
(Italy) Lotto	1995–1996	
(Germany) Adidas	1996–1997	
(Germany) Puma	1998–2018	
(France) Le Coq Sportif	2019–2022	
(United States) One All Sports	2022–2024	
(Switzerland) Fourteen	2025–present	

== Results and fixtures ==
The following is a list of match results in the last 12 months, as well as any future matches that have been scheduled.

Win Draw Loss Fixture

=== 2025 ===
13 November 2026 World Cup qualification	Cameroon	0–1	DR Congo	Rabat, Morocco
20:00 UTC+1		Report	Mbemba 90+1'	Stadium: Al Barid Stadium; Referee: Mahmood Ismail (Sudan)

24 December 2025 AFCON GS	Cameroon	1–0	Gabon	Agadir, Morocco
21:00 UTC+1	Etta Eyong 6'	Report		Stadium: Adrar Stadium; Attendance: 35,200; Referee: Amin Mohamed Omar (Egypt)

28 December 2025 AFCON GS	Ivory Coast	1–1	Cameroon	Marrakesh, Morocco
21:00 UTC+1	Amad 51'	Report	Konan 56' (o.g.)	Stadium: Marrakesh Stadium; Attendance: 35,165; Referee: Mustapha Ghorbal (Algeria)

31 December 2025 AFCON GS	Mozambique	1–2	Cameroon	Agadir, Morocco
20:00 UTC+1	Catamo 23'	Report	Nené 28' (o.g.); Kofane 55'	Stadium: Adrar Stadium; Attendance: 13,093; Referee: Jalal Jayed (Morocco)

=== 2026 ===
4 January 2025 AFCON Round of 16	South Africa	1–2	Cameroon	Rabat, Morocco
20:00 UTC+1	Makgopa 88'	Report	Tchamadeu 34'; Kofane 47'	Stadium: Al Medina Stadium; Attendance: 14,127; Referee: Peter Waweru (Kenya)

9 January 2025 AFCON QF	Cameroon	0–2	Morocco	Rabat, Morocco
20:00 UTC+1		Report	Brahim 26'; Saibari 74'	Stadium: Prince Moulay Abdellah Stadium; Attendance: 64,178; Referee: Dahane Beida (Mauritania)

27 March 2026 FIFA Series	Australia	1–0	Cameroon	Sydney, Australia
20:10 UTC+11	Bos 85'	Report		Stadium: Accor Stadium; Attendance: 23,798; Referee: Robert Jones (England)

31 March 2026 FIFA Series	Cameroon	2–0	China	Melbourne, Australia
17:00 UTC+11	Etta Eyong 3'; Alioum 9'; Keller (yellow card) 70' (yellow-red card) 90+1'	Report		Stadium: AAMI Park; Referee: Alireza Faghani (Australia)

23 September 2027 AFCON qualification	Cameroon	3–1	Comoros	Garoua, Cameroon
20:00 UTC+1	Nyengue 39'; Mbeumo 48'; Namaso 81'	Report	Omari 51'	Stadium: Roumdé Adjia Stadium; Attendance: 30,000; Referee: Abdulsalam Abiola Kasim (Nigeria)

27 September 2027 AFCON qualification	Congo	1–1	Cameroon	Brazzaville, Congo
20:00 UTC+1				Stadium: Stade Alphonse Massemba-Débat

3 October Friendly	Ivory Coast	0–1	Cameroon	Abidjan, Ivory Coast
19:00 UTC+0			Nsongo 46'	Stadium: Alassane Ouattara Stadium; Attendance: 60,000

12 November 2027 AFCON qualification	Cameroon	2–0	Namibia	Douala, Cameroon
20:00 UTC+1	Alioum 16'; Nsongo 29'	Report		Stadium: Japoma Stadium; Attendance: 50,000; Referee: Mahmood Ismail Chantir (Sudan)

16 November 2027 AFCON qualification	Namibia	0–3	Cameroon	Gaborone, Botswana
15:00 SAST		Report	Nagida 12'; Fosso 58'; Alioum 71'	Stadium: Botswana National Stadium; Referee: Tsegay Mogos Teklu (Eritrea)

=== 2027 ===
24 March 2027 AFCON qualification	Comoros	v	Cameroon	TBD, Comoros
TBD				Stadium: TBD

28 March 2027 AFCON qualification	Cameroon	v	Congo	TBD, Cameroon
TBD				Stadium: TBD

== Coaching staff ==
Position	Name
Head coach	(Cameroon) David Pagou
Assistant coach	(Cameroon) Martin Ndtoungou Mpile
Goalkeeping coach	(Cameroon) Idriss Carlos Kameni
Video analyst	(Cameroon) Régis Alain Bissengué Nandji
Fitness coach	(Cameroon) Bryan Meyeke
Doctor	(Cameroon) Dr. Fotso Gwabap Patrick Joel
Physiotherapist	(Cameroon) Daniel Che Awah
Physiotherapist	(Cameroon) Elias Kaleguem Fomekong
General Coordinator of National teams	(Cameroon) Benoit Christian Angbwa
Assistant coordinator 1	(Cameroon) Serge Reinold Pensy
Assistant coordinator 2	(Cameroon) Sarah Ntui
Team manager	(Cameroon) Nicolas Alnoudji
Team Media officer	(Cameroon) Elie Thierry Ndoh
Liaison officer	(Cameroon) Arnold Ebolo Abada
Technical director	(Cameroon) Engelbert Janvier Mbarga Ondoa

=== Coaching history ===
- Technical Committee (1960–1965)
- (France) Dominique Colonna (1965–1970)
- (Cameroon) Raymond Fobete (1970)
- (West Germany) Peter Schnittger (1970–1973)
- (Socialist Federal Republic of Yugoslavia) Vladimir Beara (1973–1975)
- (Socialist Federal Republic of Yugoslavia) Ivan Ridanović (1976–1979)
- (Socialist Federal Republic of Yugoslavia) Branko Žutić (1980–1982)
- (France) Jean Vincent (1982)
- (Socialist Federal Republic of Yugoslavia) Radivoje Ognjanović (1982–1984)
- (France) Claude Le Roy (1985–1988, 1998)
- (Soviet Union) Valery Nepomnyashchy (1988–1990)
- (France) Philippe Redon (1990–1993)
- (Cameroon) Jean Manga-Onguéné (1993–1994, 1997–1998)
- (Cameroon) Léonard Nseké (1994)
- (France) Henri Michel (1994)
- (Cameroon) Jules Nyongha (1994–1996, 2007)
- (Belgium) Henri Depireux (1996–1997)
- (France) Pierre Lechantre (1998–2001)
- (France) Robert Corfou (2001)
- (Cameroon) Jean-Paul Akono (2001, 2012–2013)
- (Germany) Winfried Schäfer (2001–2004)
- (Portugal) Artur Jorge (2004–2006)
- (Netherlands) Arie Haan (2006–2007)
- (Germany) Otto Pfister (2007–2009)
- (Cameroon) Thomas N'Kono (2009)
- (France) Paul Le Guen (2009–2010)
- (Spain) Javier Clemente (2010–2011)
- (France) Denis Lavagne (2011–2012)
- (Germany) Volker Finke (2013–2015)
- (Cameroon) Alexandre Belinga (2015–2016)
- (Belgium) Hugo Broos (2016–2017)
- (Cameroon) Rigobert Song (2017–2018, 2022–2024)
- (Netherlands) Clarence Seedorf (2018–2019)
- (Portugal) Toni Conceição (2019–2022)
- (Belgium) Marc Brys (2024–2025)
- (Cameroon) David Pagou (2025–present)

== Players ==
=== Current squad ===
The following players were selected for the 2027 Africa Cup of Nations qualification matches against Namibia on November 2026.
Caps and goals correct as of 16 November 2026, after the second match against Namibia.

No.	Pos.	Player	Date of birth (age)	Caps	Goals	Club
	GK	Simon Ngapandouetnbu	12 April 2003 (age 23)	4	0	(French Football Federation) Montpellier
	GK	Blondy Nna Noukeu	17 November 2001 (age 25)	2	0	(French Football Federation) Boulogne
	GK	Emile Lako	7 July 1999 (age 27)	0	0	(South African Football Association) Marumo Gallants
	GK	Edouard Sombang	29 May 1998 (age 28)	0	0	(Cameroonian Football Federation) Colombe Sportive
	DF	Aboubakar Nagida	28 June 2005 (age 21)	14	1	(French Football Federation) Rennes
	DF	Darlin Yongwa	21 September 2000 (age 26)	13	1	(The Football Association) Norwich City
	DF	Junior Tchamadeu	22 December 2003 (age 22)	12	1	(The Football Association) Stoke City
	DF	Samuel Kotto	3 September 2003 (age 23)	10	0	(French Football Federation) Reims
	DF	Che Malone	23 May 1999 (age 27)	9	0	(Algerian Football Federation) USM Alger
	DF	Kévin Keben	26 January 2004 (age 22)	5	0	(The Football Association) Watford
	DF	Enzo Ebosse	11 March 1999 (age 27)	3	0	(Italian Football Federation) Udinese
	DF	Lilian Njoh	21 November 2001 (age 24)	3	0	(Swiss Football Association) Servette
	DF	Oliver Kamdem	15 October 2002 (age 24)	2	0	(Bulgarian Football Union) Levski Sofia
	DF	Patrick Nkoa	11 July 1999 (age 27)	0	0	(Royal Belgian Football Association) RAAL La Louvière
	MF	Arthur Avom	15 December 2004 (age 21)	19	1	(French Football Federation) Lorient
	MF	Ryan Fosso	17 June 2002 (age 24)	7	1	(Royal Belgian Football Association) Standard Liège
	MF	David Nyengue	5 January 2002 (age 24)	5	1	(Tunisian Football Federation) ES Zarzis
	MF	Jean Hughes Eyango	12 May 2004 (age 22)	1	0	(Cameroonian Football Federation) Colombe Sportive
	MF	Ivan Jordan Nana	17 February 2007 (age 19)	1	0	(Rwanda Football Federation) Al-Hilal
	MF	Karl Gameni Wassom	21 July 2004 (age 22)	1	0	(Latvian Football Federation) Riga FC
	FW	Bryan Mbeumo	7 August 1999 (age 27)	37	8	(The Football Association) Manchester United
	FW	Danny Namaso	28 August 2000 (age 26)	15	1	(French Football Federation) Auxerre
	FW	Saidou Alioum	25 July 2003 (age 23)	7	3	(Football Association of the Czech Republic) Jablonec
	FW	Bil Nsongo	21 September 2004 (age 22)	5	2	(Royal Spanish Football Federation) Deportivo A Coruña
	FW	Angel Yondjo	10 February 2007 (age 19)	4	0	(French Football Federation) Lille
	FW	Iván Cédric	11 December 2001 (age 24)	3	0	(Turkish Football Federation) Alanyaspor
	FW	Harouna Djibirin	5 November 2006 (age 20)	2	0	(French Football Federation) Angers
	FW	Geovanni Ndjee	25 September 2007 (age 19)	1	0	(Danish Football Association) Copenhagen

=== Recent call-ups ===
The following players have also been called up for the team in the last twelve months and are still available for selection.

Pos.	Player	Date of birth (age)	Caps	Goals	Club	Latest call-up
GK	Devis Epassy	2 February 1993 (age 33)	16	0	(Romania) Dinamo București	v. China, 31 March 2026
GK	Housseini Ousmanou	28 December 2002 (age 23)	0	0	(Cameroon) Gazelle	v. China, 31 March 2026
GK	Simon Omossola	5 May 1998 (age 28)	3	0	(Democratic Republic of the Congo) Saint-Éloi Lupopo	2025 Africa Cup of Nations
DF	Jackson Tchatchoua	14 September 2001 (age 25)	17	0	(England) Wolverhampton Wanderers	v. Ivory Coast, 3 October 2026
DF	Duplexe Tchamba	10 July 1998 (age 28)	5	0	(Brazil) Remo	v. Ivory Coast, 3 October 2026
DF	Stephane Keller	20 August 2001 (age 25)	3	0	(Belgium) Beveren	v. Ivory Coast, 3 October 2026
DF	Emmanuel Moungam	26 April 2006 (age 20)	1	0	(Sweden) Landskrona	v. Ivory Coast, 3 October 2026
DF	Serge Valery Eloundou Ndzomo	10 April 2008 (age 18)	0	0	(Cameroon) AS Fortuna	v. China, 31 March 2026
DF	Nouhou Tolo (vice-captain)	23 June 1997 (age 29)	49	1	(United States) Seattle Sounders	2025 Africa Cup of Nations
DF	Christopher Wooh	18 September 2001 (age 25)	25	2	(Russia) Spartak Moscow	2025 Africa Cup of Nations
DF	Flavien Enzo Boyomo	7 October 2001 (age 25)	9	1	(Spain) Osasuna	2025 Africa Cup of Nations
DF	Gerzino Nyamsi	22 January 1997 (age 29)	2	0	(Russia) Lokomotiv Moscow	2025 Africa Cup of Nations
DF	Jean-Charles Castelletto	26 January 1995 (age 31)	36	2	(Qatar) Al-Duhail	2025 Africa Cup of Nations ^{PRE}
MF	Carlos Baleba	3 January 2004 (age 22)	16	0	(England) Manchester United	v. Namibia, 12 November 2026 ^{PRE}
MF	Arnold Maël Kamdem	18 January 2000 (age 26)	3	0	(Libya) Al-Sadaqa	v. China, 31 March 2026
MF	Brice Ambina	17 November 2001 (age 25)	1	0	(Norway) Vålerenga	v. China, 31 March 2026
MF	Hamadou Moubarak	10 December 2006 (age 19)	1	0	(Spain) Torrellano	v. China, 31 March 2026
MF	Konrad Sinyam	26 January 2005 (age 21)	1	0	(Portugal) Penafiel	v. China, 31 March 2026
MF	Jean Onana	8 January 2000 (age 26)	14	0	Unattached	2025 Africa Cup of Nations
MF	Olivier Kemen	20 July 1996 (age 30)	10	1	(Turkey) İstanbul Başakşehir	2025 Africa Cup of Nations
MF	Junior Dina Ebimbe	21 November 2000 (age 25)	3	0	(Germany) Schalke 04	2025 Africa Cup of Nations
MF	Martin Ndzie	16 January 2003 (age 23)	3	0	(Austria) Rapid Wien	2025 Africa Cup of Nations
FW	Christian Kofane	27 July 2006 (age 20)	7	2	(Germany) Bayer Leverkusen	v. Ivory Coast, 3 October 2026
FW	Maël Fernandez	5 January 2007 (age 19)	4	0	(Tunisia) Espérance de Tunis	v. Ivory Coast, 3 October 2026
FW	Karl Etta Eyong	14 October 2003 (age 23)	8	2	(Spain) Levante	v. Comoros, 23 September 2026 ^{PRE}
FW	Christian Bassogog (captain)	18 October 1995 (age 31)	59	8	(Saudi Arabia) Al-Faisaly	2025 Africa Cup of Nations
FW	Georges-Kévin Nkoudou	14 February 1995 (age 31)	20	3	(Saudi Arabia) Abha	2025 Africa Cup of Nations
FW	Frank Magri	4 September 1999 (age 27)	20	2	(Qatar) Al-Gharafa	2025 Africa Cup of Nations
FW	Patrick Soko	31 October 1997 (age 29)	5	1	(Spain) Leganés	2025 Africa Cup of Nations
^{INJ} = Withdrew from the squad due to injury^{SUS} = Serving suspension^{PRE} = Preliminary squad / standby^{WD} = Withdrew from the squad

== Player records ==
As of 13 November 2025
Players in bold are still active with Cameroon.

=== Most appearances ===
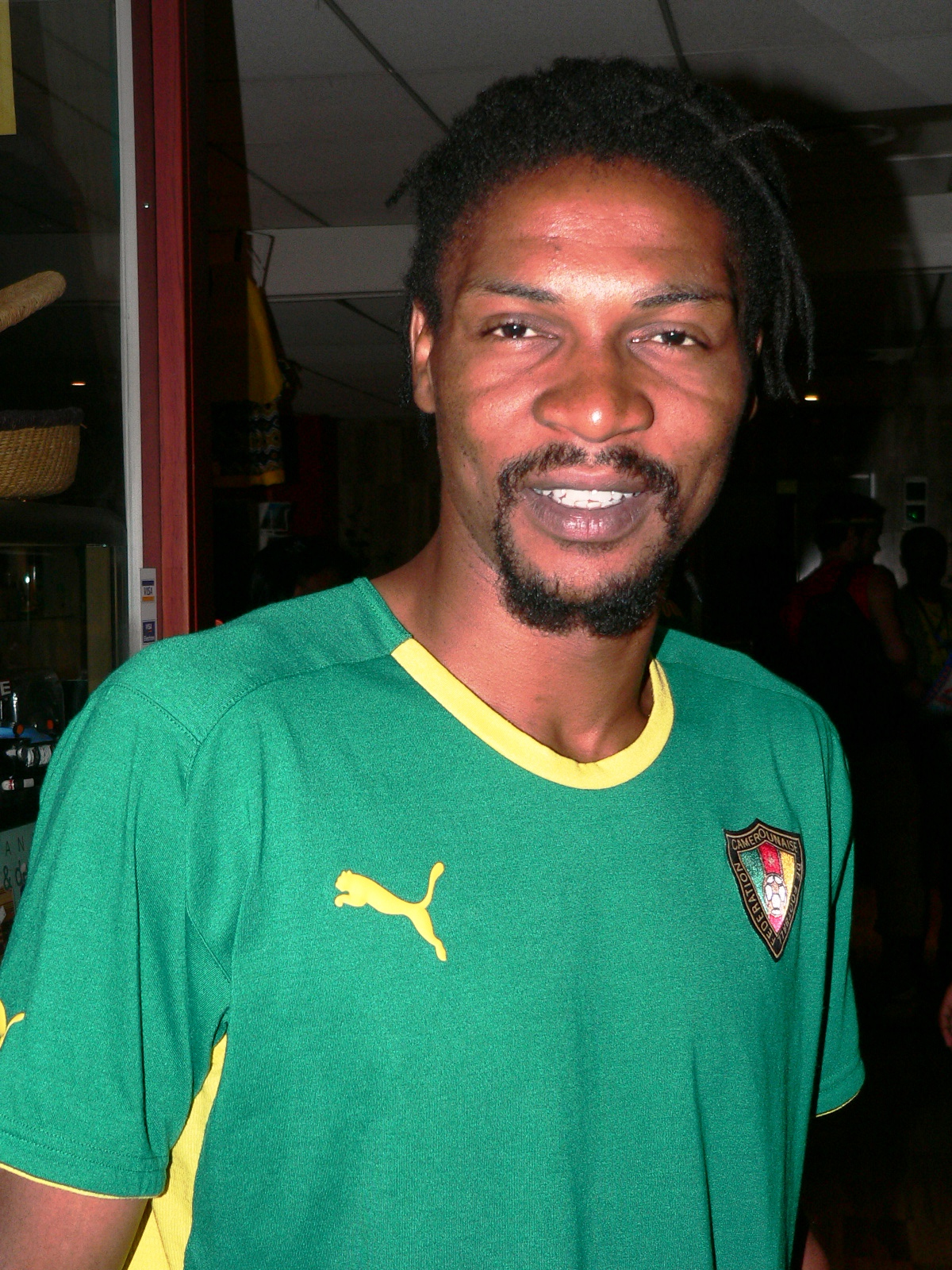
Rigobert Song is Cameroon's most capped player with 137 appearances.

Rank	Player	Caps	Goals	Career
1	Rigobert Song	137	5	1993–2010
2	Samuel Eto'o	118	56	1997–2014
2	Geremi Njitap	118	13	1996–2010
4	**Vincent Aboubakar**	117	45	2010–present
5	Emmanuel Kundé	96	16	1979–1992
6	Nicolas Nkoulou	83	2	2008–2023
7	Jacques Songo'o	80	0	1983–2002
8	Roger Milla	77	43	1973–1994
9	**Eric Maxim Choupo-Moting**	76	20	2010–present
10	Carlos Kameni	73	0	2001–2019
10	François Omam-Biyik	73	26	1985–1998

=== Top goalscorers ===
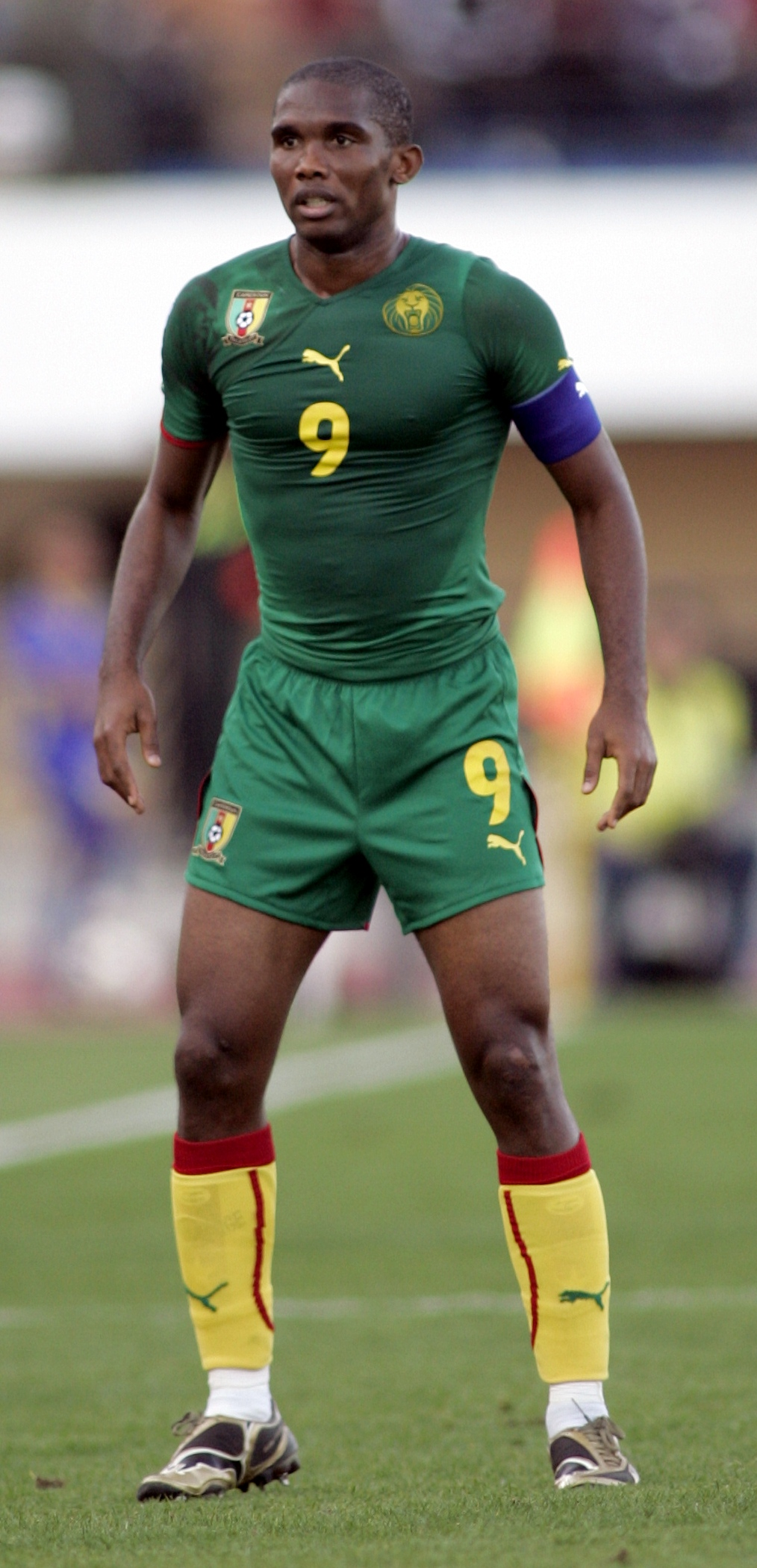
Samuel Eto'o is Cameroon's all-time top goalscorer with 56 goals.

Rank	Player	Goals	Caps	Ratio	Career
1	Samuel Eto'o (list)	56	118	0.47	1997–2014
2	**Vincent Aboubakar**	45	117	0.38	2010–present
3	Roger Milla	43	77	0.56	1973–1994
4	Patrick Mboma	33	55	0.6	1995–2004
5	François Omam-Biyik	26	73	0.36	1985–1998
6	Alphonse Tchami	21	57	0.37	1988–1998
7	**Eric Maxim Choupo-Moting**	20	76	0.26	2010–present
8	Pierre Webó	19	59	0.32	2003–2014
9	Emmanuel Kundé	16	96	0.17	1979–1992
10	André Kana-Biyik	15	59	0.25	1985–1994

== Competitive record ==
=== FIFA World Cup ===
FIFA World Cup record										Qualification record					
Year	Round	Position	Pld	W	D	L	GF	GA	Squad	Pld	W	D	L	GF	GA
1930 to 1962	Not a FIFA member									Not a FIFA member					
(England) 1966	Withdrew									Withdrew					
(Mexico) 1970	Did not qualify									2	0	1	1	3	4
(West Germany) 1974	Did not qualify									3	1	0	2	1	3
(Argentina) 1978	Did not qualify									2	0	1	1	2	4
(Spain) 1982	First group stage	17th	3	0	3	0	1	1	Squad	8	5	1	2	16	5
(Mexico) 1986	Did not qualify									2	0	1	1	2	5
(Italy) 1990	Quarter-finals	7th	5	3	0	2	7	9	Squad	8	6	1	1	12	6
(United States) 1994	Group stage	22nd	3	0	1	2	3	11	Squad	8	5	2	1	14	4
(France) 1998	Group stage	25th	3	0	2	1	2	5	Squad	6	4	2	0	10	4
(South Korea) (Japan) 2002	Group stage	20th	3	1	1	1	2	3	Squad	10	8	1	1	20	4
(Germany) 2006	Did not qualify									10	6	3	1	18	10
(South Africa) 2010	Group stage	31st	3	0	0	3	2	5	Squad	12	9	2	1	23	4
(Brazil) 2014	Group stage	32nd	3	0	0	3	1	9	Squad	8	5	2	1	12	4
(Russia) 2018	Did not qualify									8	2	5	1	10	9
(Qatar) 2022	Group stage	19th	3	1	1	1	4	4	Squad	8	6	0	2	14	5
(Canada) (Mexico) (United States) 2026	Did not qualify									11	5	4	2	17	6
(Morocco) (Portugal) (Spain) 2030	To be determined									To be determined					
(Saudi Arabia) 2034	To be determined									To be determined					
Total	Quarter-finals	8/15	26	5	8	13	22	47	—	106	62	26	18	174	77

Cameroon's World Cup record
First match	Cameroon 0–0 Peru (15 June 1982; A Coruña, Spain)
Biggest win	Argentina 0–1 Cameroon (8 June 1990; Milan, Italy)
Biggest defeat	Russia 6–1 Cameroon (28 June 1994; Stanford, United States)
Best result	Quarter-finals in 1990
Worst result	Group stage in 1982, 1994, 1998, 2002, 2010, 2014, 2022

=== FIFA Confederations Cup ===
FIFA Confederations Cup record
Year	Round	Position	Pld	W	D*	L	GF	GA	Squad
(Saudi Arabia) 1992	Did not qualify								
(Saudi Arabia) 1995	Did not qualify								
(Saudi Arabia) 1997	Did not qualify								
(Mexico) 1999	Did not qualify								
(South Korea) (Japan) 2001	Group stage	6th	3	1	0	2	2	4	Squad
(France) 2003	Runners-up	2nd	5	3	1	1	3	1	Squad
(Germany) 2005	Did not qualify								
(South Africa) 2009	Did not qualify								
(Brazil) 2013	Did not qualify								
(Russia) 2017	Group stage	7th	3	0	1	2	2	6	Squad
Total	Runners-up	3/10	11	4	2	5	7	11	—

=== Africa Cup of Nations ===
Africa Cup of Nations record									Qualification record					
Year	Round	Position	Pld	W	D*	L	GF	GA	Pld	W	D*	L	GF	GA
(Sudan) 1957	Part of France								Part of France					
(United Arab Republic) 1959	Part of France								Part of France					
(Ethiopia) 1962	Not affiliated to CAF								Not affiliated to CAF					
(Ghana) 1963	Not affiliated to CAF								Not affiliated to CAF					
(Tunisia) 1965	Did not enter								Did not enter					
(Ethiopia) 1968	Did not qualify								4	1	1	2	4	7
(Sudan) 1970	Group stage	5th	3	2	0	1	7	6	4	3	1	0	7	6
(Cameroon) 1972	Third place	3rd	5	3	1	1	10	5	Qualified as hosts					
(Egypt) 1974	Did not qualify								2	1	0	1	2	3
(Ethiopia) 1976	Did not qualify								2	1	0	1	3	4
(Ghana) 1978	Did not qualify								2	1	0	1	2	4
(Nigeria) 1980	Did not qualify								2	1	0	1	3	3
(Libya) 1982	Group stage	5th	3	0	3	0	1	1	4	2	1	1	12	5
(Ivory Coast) 1984	Champions	1st	5	3	1	1	9	3	4	2	0	2	9	5
(Egypt) 1986	Runners-up	2nd	5	3	2	0	8	5	Qualified as defending champions					
(Morocco) 1988	Champions	1st	5	3	2	0	4	1	4	2	0	2	8	5
(Algeria) 1990	Group stage	5th	3	1	0	2	2	3	Qualified as defending champions					
(Senegal) 1992	Fourth place	4th	5	2	2	1	4	3	6	3	3	0	5	1
(Tunisia) 1994	Did not qualify								6	3	3	0	7	0
(South Africa) 1996	Group stage	9th	3	1	1	1	5	7	6	3	1	2	7	7
(Burkina Faso) 1998	Quarter-finals	8th	4	2	1	1	5	4	6	2	4	0	8	3
(Ghana) (Nigeria) 2000	Champions	1st	6	3	2	1	11	5	Qualified as defending champions					
(Mali) 2002	Champions	1st	6	5	1	0	9	0	Qualified as defending champions					
(Tunisia) 2004	Quarter-finals	6th	4	1	2	1	7	6	Qualified as defending champions					
(Egypt) 2006	Quarter-finals	5th	4	3	1	0	8	2	10	6	3	1	13	4
(Ghana) 2008	Runners-up	2nd	6	4	0	2	14	8	6	5	0	1	13	4
(Angola) 2010	Quarter-finals	7th	4	1	1	2	6	8	10	9	2	2	24	4
(Equatorial Guinea) (Gabon) 2012	Did not qualify								6	3	2	1	12	5
(South Africa) 2013	Did not qualify								4	2	0	2	3	4
(Equatorial Guinea) 2015	Group stage	13th	3	0	2	1	2	3	6	4	2	0	9	1
(Gabon) 2017	Champions	1st	6	3	3	0	7	3	6	4	2	0	7	2
(Egypt) 2019	Round of 16	13th	4	1	2	1	4	3	6	3	2	1	6	3
(Cameroon) 2021	Third place	3rd	7	4	3	0	14	7	6	3	2	1	8	4
(Ivory Coast) 2023	Round of 16	14th	4	1	1	2	5	8	4	2	1	1	6	3
(Morocco) 2025	Quarter-finals	7th	5	3	1	1	6	5	6	4	2	0	8	2
(Kenya) (Tanzania) (Uganda) 2027	To be determined								To be determined					
Total	5 Titles	22/35	100	49	32	19	148	96	122	70	32	22	186	89

*Denotes draws including knockout matches decided via penalty shoot-out.
**Red border colour indicates tournament was held on home soil.

Cameroon's Africa Cup of Nations record
First match	Cameroon 3–2 Ivory Coast (6 February 1970; Khartoum, Sudan)
Biggest win	Cameroon 5–1 Zambia (26 January 2008; Kumasi, Ghana)
Biggest defeat	South Africa 3–0 Cameroon (13 January 1996; Johannesburg, South Africa)
Best result	Champions in 1984, 1988, 2000, 2002, 2017
Worst result	Group stage in 1970, 1982, 1990, 1996, 2015

=== African Nations Championship ===
African Nations Championship record
Appearances: 4
Year	Round	Position	Pld	W	D*	L	GF	GA
(Ivory Coast) 2009	Did not qualify							
(Sudan) 2011	Quarter-finals	5th	4	3	1	0	5	0
(South Africa) 2014	Did not qualify							
(Rwanda) 2016	Quarter-finals	5th	4	2	1	1	4	4
(Morocco) 2018	Group stage	12th	3	0	1	2	1	3
(Cameroon) 2020	Fourth place	4th	6	2	2	2	4	8
(Algeria) 2022	Group stage	8th	2	1	0	1	1	3
(Kenya) 2024	Did not qualify							
Total	Fourth place	4/9	17	7	5	5	14	15

=== Summer Olympics ===
Olympic Games record
Year	Result	Position	Pld	W	D*	L	GF	GA
(France) 1900 to (Italy) 1960	Did not enter							
(Japan) 1964 to (West Germany) 1972	Did not qualify							
(Canada) 1976	Did not enter							
(Soviet Union) 1980	Did not qualify							
(United States) 1984	Round 1	11th	3	1	0	2	3	5
(South Korea) 1988	Did not qualify							
1992–present	See Cameroon national under-23 football team							
Total	Round 1	1/19	3	1	0	2	3	5

Football at the Summer Olympics has been an under-23 tournament since 1992.

=== African Games ===
African Games record
Year	Result	Pld	W	D	L	GF	GA
(Algeria) 1978	5th	3	0	2	1	2	3
(Kenya) 1987	4th	5	2	2	1	11	8
Total	2/4	8	2	4	2	13	11

== Honours ==
=== Global ===
- FIFA Confederations Cup
  - (silver) Runners-up (1): 2003

=== Intercontinental ===
- Afro-Asian Cup of Nations
  - (gold) Champions (1): 1985

=== Continental ===
- CAF African Cup of Nations
  - Champions (5): 1984, 1988, 2000, 2002, 2017
  - Runners-up (2): 1986, 2008
  - Third place (2): 1972, 2021

=== Subregional ===
- UDEAC Cup
  - (gold) Champions (4): 1984, 1986, 1987, 1989
  - (silver) Runners-up (2): 1988, 1990
  - (bronze) Third place (1): 1985
- CEMAC Cup
  - (gold) Champions (3): 2003, 2005, 2008
  - (silver) Runners-up (2): 2006, 2010
  - (bronze) Third place (1): 2014
- Central African Games
  - (gold) Gold medal (2): 1976, 1987

=== Friendly ===
- Jeux de la Coupe des Tropiques (1): 1964
- LG Cup (1): 2011
- Greece Tournament (1): 1994

=== Awards ===
- African National Team of the Year (7): 1984, 1987, 1988, 1989, 1990, 2000, 2003

=== Summary ===
Competition	1st place, gold medalist(s)	2nd place, silver medalist(s)	3rd place, bronze medalist(s)	Total
FIFA Confederations Cup	0	1	0	1
CAF African Cup of Nations	5	2	2	9
Afro-Asian Cup of Nations	1	0	0	1
Total	6	3	2	11

== See also ==
- Cameroon women's national football team
- Cultural significance of the lion in Cameroon
