= List of football clubs in Chad =

For a complete list see Category:Football clubs in Chad

== A ==
- AS CotonTchad
- AS DGSSIE
- AS Douth
- AS Mairie

== E ==
- Elect Sport d'Abéché
- Elect-Sport FC
- Espérance de Walia

== F ==
- Foullah Edifice FC

== G ==
- Garde Républicaine
- Gazelle FC
- Geyser FC

== P ==
- Postel 2000 FC

== R ==
- Renaissance FC

== T ==
- Toumaï FC
- Tourbillon FC

== See also ==
- Chad Premier League
- Chad Cup
