= 2011 Première Division (Ligue de N'Djaména) =

Chad Premier League
- Season: 2011
- Champions: Foullah Edifice; 1st title
- Relegated: Geyser
- Champions League: Foullah Edifice
- Confederation Cup: Renaissance
- Matches: 90
- Goals: 229 (2.54 per match)
- Biggest home win: Foullah Edifice 6–0 Geyser (15 March 2011)
- Biggest away win: Geyser 1–7 Gazelle (21 May 2011)
- Highest scoring: Geyser 2–7 Foullah Edifice (2 June 2011)
- Longest winning run: 9 games Foullah Edifice
- Longest unbeaten run: 9 games Foullah Edifice
- Longest winless run: 13 games Geyser
- Longest losing run: 8 games Geyser
- All statistics correct as of 29 August 2015.

The 2011 Première Division (Ligue de N'Djaména) was the 24th season of the Chad Premier League, the top Chadian league for association football clubs, since its establishment in 1988. The season started on 16 January 2011 and concluded in June 2011.

It was the second time that Ligue de N'Djaména, championship where only clubs from N'Djamena participated, was considered a National Championship.

Tourbillon came into the season as defending champions of the 2010 season.

Foullah Edifice won the title with 43 points, and +23 goal-difference.

== Teams ==
Location of clubs for the 2011 season

The participating teams were:

- AS CotonTchad (N'Djamena)
- AS DGSSIE (N'Djamena)
- Elect-Sport FC (N'Djamena)
- Foullah Edifice FC (N'Djamena)
- Gazelle FC (N'Djamena)
- Geyser (N'Djamena)
- Postel 2000 (N'Djamena)
- Renaissance FC (N'Djamena)
- Toumai FC (N'Djamena)
- Tourbillon FC (N'Djamena)

=== Personnel and kits ===
Note: Flags indicate national team as has been defined under FIFA eligibility rules. Players may hold more than one non-FIFA nationality.

Team	Manager^{1}	Captain	Kit manufacturer	Shirt sponsor
ASCOT	(Chad) Oumar Francis	(Chad) Esaie Djikoloum	Adidas	No sponsor
DGSSIE				
Elect	(Chad) Mahamat Abakar		Errea	No sponsor
Foullah	(Chad) Emmanuel Boukar	(Chad) Massama Asselmo		No sponsor
Gazelle	(Chad) Julien Toukam	(Chad) Hilaire Kedigui	Adidas	Vinci
Geyser				
Postel				
RFC	(Chad) Djimiang Mbailemdana	(Chad) Hassan Diallo	Unknown	No sponsor
Toumai			Adidas	No sponsor
Tourbillon	(Chad) Mahamat Adoum	(Chad) Sitamadji Allarassem		C.N.T.

== Results ==
=== League table ===
Pos	Team	Pld	W	D	L	GF	GA	GD	Pts	Qualification or relegation
1	Foullah (C)	18	14	1	3	34	11	+23	43	Qualification to Champions League preliminary round
2	Tourbillon	18	11	2	5	33	15	+18	35	Qualification to Confederation Cup preliminary round
3	Renaissance	18	9	5	4	26	15	+11	32	
4	DGSSIE	18	9	5	4	23	16	+7	32	
5	Gazelle	18	7	5	6	18	26	−8	26	
6	CotonTchad	18	8	2	8	24	23	+1	26	
7	Elect-Sport	18	6	6	6	27	26	+1	24	
8	Postel 2000	18	3	5	10	18	30	−12	14	
9	Toumai FC	18	3	4	11	13	24	−11	13	Relegation play-off
10	Geyser (R)	18	1	3	14	13	53	−40	6	Relegation to D2

Source: Première Division (Ligue de N'Djamena)
(C) Champions; (R) Relegated
