= 2017 LINAFOOT (Chad) =

LINAFOOT
- Season: 2017
- Dates: 7 May 2017 - interrupted
- Relegated: Elect-Sport; Tourbillon
- Matches: 30
- Goals: 80 (2.67 per match)
- All statistics correct as of 21 June 2017.

The 2017 LINAFOOT was supposed to be the 2nd season of the LINAFOOT, the top Chadian league for association football clubs since its establishment in 2015. Gazelle as 2015 season winners, were the defending champions, since 2016 season was interrupted due financial difficulties. The season started on 7 May 2017.

== Events ==
Following financial difficulties and the lack of sponsors, FTFA decided to implement the new format of the national championship, which would lower the costs. In 2017 FIFA proposed to FTFA a new championship format, which FTFA accepted. The new formula of the national football championship took place in two phases. The first phase, called a zonal phase, consistsed of three zones. Zone 1 consisted of six clubs from N'Djamena (RFC, Gazelle, Tourbillon, Elect-Sport, Foullah Ediffice and Ascot), Zone 2 consisted of the clubs from Sarh, Koumra, Doba, Moundou, Pala and Bongor, Zone 3 included the clubs of Moussoro, Ati, Biltine, Mongo, Salamat and Abéché. At the end of the zonal confrontations, three clubs in Zone 2 and Zone 3 have joined the 4 qualifiers in Zone 1 for the second phase of the championship. The 5th and 6th of the final ranking should have been officially relegated to lower division. Matches were usually being played at 4 p.m. local time. Zone 1 playoff matches were being played on 3 stadiums: Stade d'Académie de Farcha, Stade Omnisports Idriss Mahamat Ouya and Stade de Paris-Congo.

== League playoff ==
=== Zone 1 playoff ===
Pos	Team	Pld	W	D	L	GF	GA	GD	Pts	Qualification or relegation
1	Gazelle FC (Q)	10	7	3	0	21	9	+12	24	2017 LINAFOOT
2	Foullah Edifice FC (Q)	10	4	2	4	16	12	+4	14	2017 LINAFOOT
3	AS CotonTchad (Q)	10	4	2	4	12	15	−3	14	2017 LINAFOOT
4	Renaissance FC (Q)	10	4	0	6	10	14	−4	12	2017 LINAFOOT
5	Elect-Sport FC	10	2	4	4	10	10	0	10	Relegation to D2
6	Tourbillon FC	10	3	1	6	11	14	−3	10	Relegation to D2

Updated to match(es) played on 15 June 2017. Source: FTFA
Rules for classification: 1) points; 2) head-to-head points; 3) head-to-head goal difference; 4) head-to-head goals scored; 5) head-to-head goals allowed; 6) playoff
(Q) Qualified for the phase indicated

=== Zone 2 playoff ===
The following 6 teams competed in Zone 2 playoff for the national championship:

- ASCOT Moundou (Moundou) - champions of Moundou
- AS Lycod Doba (Doba) - champions of Doba
- FC Kebbi (Bongor) - champions of Bongor
- Abeilles FC Mandoul - champions of Koumra
- Champions of Sarh
- Sonacim FC (Pala) - champions of Pala

=== Zone 3 playoff ===
The following 6 teams competed in Zone 3 playoff for the national championship:

- AS Mirim Mongo (Mongo) - champions of Mongo
- AS Wadi Fira (Biltine) - champions of Biltine
- Eléphant de Zakouma (Am Timan) - champions of Salamat
- Ouaddaï FC (Abéché) - champions of Abéché
- Champions of Moussoro
- Champions of Ati

== Second phase ==
The teams that qualified for the Second Phase of championship were:

- AS CotonTchad (N'Djamena) - from Zone 1
- Foullah Edifice FC (N'Djamena) - from Zone 1
- Gazelle FC (N'Djamena) - from Zone 1*
- Renaissance FC (N'Djamena) - from Zone 1
- Elect-Sport FC (N'Djamena) - from Zone 1*
- Tourbillon FC (N'Djamena) - from Zone 1*
- ASCOT Moundou (Moundou) - from Zone 2
- AS Lycod Doba (Doba) - from Zone 2
- Abeilles FC Mandoul - from Zone 2
- AS Mirim Mongo (Mongo) - from Zone 3
- AS Wadi Fira (Biltine) - from Zone 3
- Eléphant de Zakouma (Am Timan) - from Zone 3

Note: Gazelle FC excluded; Elect-Sport FC and Tourbillon FC admitted

The second phase began in October 2017, but was suspended in November 2017.

== Managers ==
Nat.	Name	Club	Appointed	Time as manager
(Chad)		AS Lycod Doba		
(Chad)	Moussa Kodbe	AS Mirim Mongo		
(Chad)		AS Wadi Fira		
(Chad)		ASCOT Moundou		
(Chad)		AS CotonTchad		
(Chad)	Amane Adoum	Elect-Sport FC	2016	
(Chad)	Nodjidoumde Espoir	FC Kebbi		
(Chad)	Djindo Manadji Samuel	Foullah Edifice FC	2015	
(Chad)	Mahamat Allamine Abakar	Gazelle FC	2016	
(Chad)	Oumar Francis	Renaissance FC		
(Chad)		Ouaddai FC (Abéché)		
(Chad)	Cesare	AS Kokaga		
