= 2010 Première Division (Ligue de N'Djaména) =

Chad Premier League
- Season: 2010
- Champions: Tourbillon; 5th title 6th Chadian title
- Relegated: USM
- Champions League: Tourbillon
- Confederation Cup: Foullah Edifice
- Matches: 90
- Top goalscorer: Mahamat Adda
- All statistics correct as of 15 October 2019.

The 2010 Première Division (Ligue de N'Djaména) was the 23rd season of the Chad Premier League, the top Chadian league for association football clubs, since its establishment in 1988. National championship system was changed for this season, and it was decided that Ligue de N'Djaména will be considered national championship, unlike seasons before, where the championship consisted out of regional champions only. The season began in January 2010, and concluded on 12 October 2010.

It was the first time (out of 5) that Ligue de N'Djaména was considered national championship, meaning only clubs from N'Djamena participated. The matches were usually played at 16:00, 19:30 and 20:00 local time.

Gazelle came into the season as defending champions of the 2009 season.

Tourbillon won the title with 38 points, and +17 goal-difference.

== Summary ==
Tourbillon claimed the league title on the final day of the season with a 3–1 win over Elect-Sport, finishing on 38 points. The clubs faced many problems during the season, including breaching of the contract obligations by sponsors, which was one of the subjects on the press conference organised by vice-president of the league and the leaders of the clubs on April 22, 2010. Among the other problems was the inability to play the night games. The championship was also interrupted for almost 4 months after 12 fixtures, and resumed on August 28, 2010. At the end of the August, FTFA responded to the grievances of the teams and gave each club 1 million FCFA, 10 millions total, with an announcement that a second installment will be paid soon after. The clubs' budgets were stopped for 6 months and during this period, they only continued to bear the expenses. Also, it was decided that the championship will accelerate. Thus, to be able to finish the 2010 sports season before October 2010, each club played, after the league playoffs (which began after the fourteenth day), two league games per week.

== Teams ==
Location of clubs for the 2010 season

The participating teams were:

- AS CotonTchad (N'Djamena)
- AS DGSSIE (N'Djamena)
- Elect-Sport FC (N'Djamena)
- Foullah Edifice FC (N'Djamena)
- Gazelle FC (N'Djamena)
- Postel 2000 (N'Djamena)
- Renaissance FC (N'Djamena)
- Toumai FC (N'Djamena)
- Tourbillon FC (N'Djamena)
- USM (N'Djamena)

== Scoring ==
=== Top scorers ===
Rank	Player	Club	Goals
1	(Chad) Mahamat Adda	AS CotonTchad	
