= 2016 LINAFOOT (Chad) =

LINAFOOT
- Season: 2016
- Dates: 28 July 2016 - October 2016 (interrupted)
- Champions: No winner (championship interrupted)
- Champions League: No representative
- Confederation Cup: No representative
- Matches played: 15
- Goals scored: 46 (3.07 per match)
- All statistics correct as of 8 July 2017.

The 2016 LINAFOOT was supposed to be the second season of the LINAFOOT, the top Chadian league for association football clubs since its establishment in 2015. Gazelle were the defending champions. The season started on 28 July 2016. However, the championship was interrupted due financial difficulties, at the end of October.

== Events ==
In January 2016 the FTFA decided not to organise playoff for the ligue relegation and promotion from lower division, due to lack of time and finances. Instead, new rules were applied: a) the club from N'Djamena which finished fifth in the previous championship will be relegated to lower division, and the champion of Ligue de Football de N’Djamena will replace it; b) the champions of the regional leagues (Abéché – Mongo – Sarh – Moundou – Doba – Bongor – Biltine – Amtiman – Koumra and Pala) will be promoted to the first division, meaning that the first division was supposed to have 16 clubs. However, due financial difficulties, championship was interrupted after only five rounds, and no Chadian clubs represented the country in continental competitions.

== Teams ==
The following 6 clubs were competing in the 2016 LINAFOOT season (Zone de N'Djaména):

- AS CotonTchad (N'Djamena)
- Elect-Sport FC (N'Djamena)
- Foullah Edifice FC (N'Djamena)
- Gazelle FC (N'Djamena)
- Renaissance FC (N'Djamena)
- Tourbillon FC (N'Djamena)

== Final standings ==
| Pos | Team | Pld | W | D | L | GF | GA | GD | Pts |
|---|---|---|---|---|---|---|---|---|---|
| 1 | Gazelle FC (C) | 5 | 3 | 2 | 0 | 15 | 8 | +7 | 11 |
| 2 | Foullah Édifice | 5 | 2 | 3 | 0 | 9 | 5 | +4 | 9 |
| 3 | Elect-Sport | 5 | 2 | 2 | 1 | 4 | 4 | 0 | 8 |
| 4 | AS CotonTchad | 5 | 1 | 2 | 2 | 8 | 8 | 0 | 5 |
| 5 | Tourbillon FC | 5 | 1 | 1 | 3 | 4 | 11 | −7 | 4 |
| 6 | Renaissance FC | 5 | 0 | 2 | 3 | 6 | 10 | −4 | 2 |

(C) Champions
