= 2018 LINAFOOT (Chad) =

LINAFOOT
- Season: 2018
- Dates: 15 September 2018 - 7 October 2018
- Champions: Elect-Sport FC; 1st LINAFOOT title 5th Chadian title
- Champions League: Elect-Sport FC
- Confederation Cup: AS CotonTchad
- Matches: 33
- Goals: 101 (3.06 per match)
- Top goalscorer: Abou Deco (14)

The 2018 LINAFOOT was the 2nd season of the LINAFOOT, the top Chadian league for association football clubs since its establishment in 2015.

Unlike the 1st LINAFOOT edition (in 2015) organised as a full national championship and won by Gazelle FC, this edition was organized under the play-off formula.

The season started on 15 September 2018 and concluded on 7 October 2018. The twelve teams were divided into two groups of six teams. The matches were played at three stadiums: Stade d'Académie de Farcha, Stade Omnisports Idriss Mahamat Ouya and Stade de Paris-Congo. All matches were being played at 03:30 p.m. local time. Elect-Sport FC won their fifth Chadian title. Abou Deco (AS CotonTchad) was the league topscorer with 14 goals; Mbangousoum Éric was voted the best player; Francis Oumar Belonga (Elect-Sport FC) was voted the best coach.

== Group stage ==
=== Group A ===
Pos	Team	Pld	W	D	L	GF	GA	GD	Pts	Qualification or relegation
1	Renaissance FC	5	4	1	0	17	3	+14	13	Qualification to play-offs
2	Tourbillon FC	5	3	1	1	8	3	+5	10	Qualification to play-offs
3	AS Eléphant de Zakouma d'Am-Timan	5	2	1	2	4	5	−1	7	
4	AS Wadi-Fira Biltine	5	2	0	3	3	6	−3	6	
5	Les Abeilles du Mandoul	5	1	2	2	3	10	−7	5	
6	AS CotonTchad Moundou	5	0	1	4	3	11	−8	1	

Updated to match(es) played on 5 January 2019. Source:

=== Group B ===
Pos	Team	Pld	W	D	L	GF	GA	GD	Pts	Qualification or relegation
1	AS CotonTchad	5	3	2	0	14	5	+9	11	Qualification to play-offs
2	Elect-Sport FC	5	3	1	1	11	6	+5	10	Qualification to play-offs
3	Foullah Edifice FC	5	2	1	2	10	6	+4	7	
4	Gazelle FC	5	2	1	2	10	11	−1	7	
5	AS Mirim Mongo	5	1	1	3	5	9	−4	4	
6	AS Lycod de Doba	5	1	0	4	5	18	−13	3	

Updated to match(es) played on 5 January 2019. Source:

== Knockout stage ==
=== Semi-finals ===
[Oct 2]

Renaissance (N'Djaména) 0-0 Elect Sport [3-4 pen]

Coton Tchad (N'Djaména) 3-0 Tourbillon

=== Third place match ===
[Oct 6] Renaissance (N'Djaména) 1-2 Tourbillon

=== Final ===
[Oct 7, stade Idriss Mohamat Ouya, N'Djaména]

Coton Tchad (N'Djaména) 1-1 Elect Sport [3-4 pen]

- Elect-Sport FC qualified for the 2018–19 CAF Champions League.
- AS CotonTchad qualified for the 2018–19 CAF Confederation Cup.
