= 2009 Première Division (Chad) =

Top Chadian association football league

Chad Premier League
- Season: 2009
- Champions: Gazelle; 1st title
- Champions League: Gazelle
- Confederation Cup: AS CotonTchad
- All statistics correct as of 15 October 2019.

The 2009 Première Division was the Chad Premier League season, the top Chadian league for association football clubs, for 2008/09. Elect-Sport came into the season as defending champions of the 2008 season. Gazelle won the National Championship title after beating Renaissance (Abéché) 3–1 in the final. AS CotonTchad as the cup winners qualified to Confederation Cup, after beating ASBNF de Koumra 3–0 in the final.

== Summary ==
=== Ligue de N'Djamena ===
Ligue de N'Djamena for this season was expanded from 10 to 12 clubs. League run from March to October with each team playing 22 matches (playing all 11 other teams both home and away). The league was contested by the 10 teams from the 2008 season as well as Postel 2000 and Toumai who joined as the promoted clubs from the Ligue de N'Djamena D2. The season started in March 2009, and concluded on 4 October 2009. Petro Sport FC was renamed to NBK. Gazelle won the title, Tourbillon finished runners-up, Renaissance finished third. NBK, Faucon Sporting and AS Douth were relegated to Ligue de N'Djamena D2. Gazelle as the winners of the Ligue de N'Djamena qualified to National Championship.

=== National Championship ===
Gazelle as the winners of the Ligue de N'Djamena qualified to National Championship, the final stage, which gathers winners of regional leagues. On 3 January 2010 Gazelle beat Renaissance (Abéché) 3–1 in the final, and became champions of Chad.

== Teams ==
The participating teams in Ligue de N'Djamena were:

- AS CotonTchad (N'Djamena)
- AS DGSSIE (N'Djamena)
- AS Douth
- Elect-Sport FC (N'Djamena)
- Faucon Sporting
- Foullah Edifice FC (N'Djamena)
- Gazelle (N'Djamena)
- NBK
- Postel 2000 (N'Djamena)
- Renaissance (N'Djamena)
- Toumai (N'Djamena)
- Tourbillon (N'Djamena)
