= 2019 LINAFOOT (Chad) =

LINAFOOT
- Season: 2019
- Dates: 9 June 2019 – 25 June 2019
- Champions: Elect-Sport FC; 2nd LINAFOOT title 6th Chadian title
- Champions League: Elect-Sport FC
- Confederation Cup: AS CotonTchad
- Matches: 31
- Goals: 150 (4.84 per match)
- Top goalscorer: Goyam César (10)
- Best goalkeeper: Adoum Deffallah (Elect-Sport)

The 2019 LINAFOOT was the 3rd season of the LINAFOOT, the top Chadian league for association football clubs since its establishment in 2015.

Unlike the 1st LINAFOOT edition (in 2015) organised as a full national championship and won by Gazelle FC, this edition was organized under the play-off formula.

Elect-Sport FC won their sixth Chadian title. Goyam César (Avenir Sarh) was the league topscorer with 10 goals; Brahim Ngaroudal was voted the best player; Adoum Deffallah (Elect-Sport FC) was voted best goalkeeper; Francis Oumar Belonga (Elect-Sport FC) was voted the best coach.

== Teams ==
A total of 12 teams competed in the tournament. Four teams qualified from N’Djamena:

- Elect-Sport FC
- AS CotonTchad
- Gazelle FC
- Renaissance FC

Eight teams qualified from provinces:

- Renaissance de Moussoro
- Scorpion de Bourkou
- Avenir de Sarh
- Educa de Moundou
- Boule d’Or de Pala
- AS Commune de Kélo
- AS Eléphant de Zakouma d'Am-Timan
- Renaissance d’Abèche

== Group stage ==
The 12 teams were divided into two groups of six teams. The top team of each group qualified for the final. The group stage matches were played from 9 to 22 June 2019.

=== Group A ===
| Pos | Team | Pld | W | D | L | GF | GA | GD | Pts | Qualification or relegation |
|---|---|---|---|---|---|---|---|---|---|---|
| 1 | Elect-Sport FC (Q) | 5 | 4 | 1 | 0 | 25 | 0 | +25 | 13 | Qualification for Final |
| 2 | Renaissance FC | 5 | 4 | 1 | 0 | 20 | 2 | +18 | 13 | |
| 3 | Avenir de Sarh | 5 | 3 | 0 | 2 | 10 | 11 | −1 | 9 | |
| 4 | AS Eléphant de Zakouma d'Am-Timan | 5 | 2 | 0 | 3 | 11 | 14 | −3 | 6 | |
| 5 | AS Commune de Kélo | 5 | 1 | 0 | 4 | 5 | 16 | −11 | 3 | |
| 6 | Renaissance de Moussoro | 5 | 0 | 0 | 5 | 2 | 30 | −28 | 0 | |

Source: RSSSF
(Q) Qualified for the phase indicated

=== Group B ===
| Pos | Team | Pld | W | D | L | GF | GA | GD | Pts | Qualification or relegation |
|---|---|---|---|---|---|---|---|---|---|---|
| 1 | AS CotonTchad (Q) | 5 | 5 | 0 | 0 | 24 | 5 | +19 | 15 | Qualification for Final |
| 2 | Gazelle FC | 5 | 3 | 0 | 2 | 16 | 8 | +8 | 9 | |
| 3 | Educa de Moundou | 5 | 3 | 0 | 2 | 10 | 10 | 0 | 9 | |
| 4 | Renaissance d’Abèche | 5 | 2 | 0 | 3 | 11 | 15 | −4 | 6 | |
| 5 | Boule d'Or de Pala | 5 | 1 | 0 | 4 | 7 | 16 | −9 | 3 | |
| 6 | Scorpion de Bourkou | 5 | 1 | 0 | 4 | 5 | 19 | −14 | 3 | |

Source: RSSSF
(Q) Qualified for the phase indicated

== Final ==
25 June 2019

| Elect-Sport FC | 4–0 | AS CotonTchad |

Stade Omnisports Idriss Mahamat Ouya
- Elect-Sport FC qualified for the 2019–20 CAF Champions League.
- AS CotonTchad qualified for the 2019–20 CAF Confederation Cup.
