= 2015 LINAFOOT (Chad) =

LINAFOOT
- Season: 2015
- Dates: 7 February 2015 - 24 December 2015
- Champions: Gazelle; 3rd title
- Champions League: ASCOT
- Confederation Cup: Renaissance FC
- Matches played: 132
- Top goalscorer: Beadoum Monde (28)
- Biggest home win: Gazelle 9–2 ASCOT Moundou (19 February 2015); Ascot N'Djamena 7–0 Lycod Doba (15 August 2015)
- Biggest away win: Lycod Doba 0-4 Gazelle (22 March 2015)
- Highest scoring: Gazelle 9–2 ASCOT Moundou (19 February 2015)
- Longest winning run: 14 games Gazelle
- Longest unbeaten run: 15 games Gazelle
- All statistics correct as of 21 June 2017.

The 2015 LINAFOOT was the inaugural season of the LINAFOOT, the top Chadian league for association football clubs. The season was supposed to run from February to August, with teams playing 22 matches each (playing each team in the league twice, home and away) totalling 132 matches in the season. However, due financial difficulties, championship was interrupted after 15 rounds and later resumed, finishing on 24 December 2015.

Gazelle won their third title. The defending champions were Foullah Edifice who finished in 4th position.

== Events ==
From season 2015, national league system went through many changes. LINAFOOT started operating the league. The new system of 12 clubs from all over the country was introduced as well. Clubs that played in the first division were: AS Lycod Doba, AS Mirim Mongo, AS Wadi Fira, ASCOT Moundou, AS CotonTchad, Elect-Sport FC, FC Kebbi, Foullah Edifice FC, Gazelle FC, Renaissance FC, Renaissance FC (Abéché), AS Kokaga. The matches were usually being played at 15:30h or 16:00h local time. Gazelle FC won the championship. This edition of LINAFOOT was marked by many controversies, which led to proclaiming AS CotonTchad league champion, and then later giving Gazelle FC champion title back. Following a controversy over a Gazelle player with contracts with two clubs, the Chadian Football Federation after their championship win decided to inscribe ASCOT and Renaissance FC into the African club competition, thus Gazelle did not appear in the 2016 CAF Champions League.

== Teams ==
Location of clubs for the 2015 season

The participating teams were:

- AS Lycod Doba
- AS Mirim Mongo
- AS Wadi Fira
- ASCOT Moundou
- AS CotonTchad
- Elect-Sport FC
- FC Kebbi
- Foullah Edifice FC
- Gazelle FC
- Renaissance FC
- Renaissance FC (Abéché)
- AS Kokaga

== Managers ==
Nat.	Name	Club	Appointed	Time as manager
(Chad)		AS Lycod Doba		
(Chad)		AS Mirim Mongo		
(Chad)		AS Wadi Fira		
(Chad)		ASCOT Moundou		
(Chad)		AS CotonTchad		
(Chad)	Toukam Julien	Elect-Sport FC		
(Chad)	Nodjidoumde Espoir	FC Kebbi		
(Chad)	Djindo Manadji Samuel	Foullah Edifice FC		
(Chad)	Mamadou Bodjim	Gazelle FC		
(Chad)	Francis Oumar Belonga	Renaissance FC		
(Chad)		Renaissance FC (Abéché)		
(Chad)	Cesare	AS Kokaga		

== League table ==
Pos	Team	Pld	W	D	L	GF	GA	GD	Pts	Qualification
1	Gazelle (C)	22	17	3	2	67	22	+45	54	
2	Ascot N'Djamena (Q)	22	17	2	3	62	18	+44	53	2016 CAF Champions League
3	Renaissance FC (Q)	25	17	3	5	49	21	+28	54	2016 CAF Confederation Cup
4	Foullah Edifice	22	13	3	6	39	17	+22	42	
5	ASCOT Moundou	22	7	5	10	29	36	−7	26	
6	Elect-Sport	21	8	4	9	28	37	−9	28	
7	Lycod Doba	22	8	4	10	21	44	−23	28	
8	Renaissance FC (Abéché)	21	5	7	9	13	26	−13	22	
9	Mirim Mongo	27	5	7	15	19	36	−17	22	
10	FC Kebbi	27	5	7	15	19	36	−17	22	
11	AS Kokaga	22	3	6	13	24	42	−18	15	
12	Wadi Fira	19	3	4	12	6	27	−21	13	

Updated to match(es) played on 15 June 2017. Source: FTFA
Rules for classification: 1) points; 2) head-to-head points; 3) head-to-head goal difference; 4) head-to-head goals scored; 5) head-to-head goals allowed; 6) playoff
(C) Champions; (Q) Qualified for the phase indicated
