= 2013–14 CA Bordj Bou Arréridj season =

CA Bordj Bou Arréridj
2013–14 season
- Chairman: Djamel Messaoudene
- Head coach: Rachid Belhout (until 4 November 2013); Nabil Kouki (from 5 November 2013} (until 16 December 2013} Mustapha Biskri (from 17 December 2013} (until 14 March 2014}
- Stadium: Stade 20 Août 1955
- Ligue 1: 15th
- Algerian Cup: Round of 64
- Top goalscorer: League: Yaya Kerim (3); Mohamed Tiaiba (3); All: Yaya Kerim (3); Mohamed Tiaiba (3); Lounés Bendahmane (3)

In the 2013–14 season, CA Bordj Bou Arréridj is competing in the Ligue 1 for the 13th season, as well as the Algerian Cup. It is their 13th consecutive season in the top flight of Algerian football. They will be competing in Ligue 1, and the Algerian Cup.

== Squad list ==
Players and squad numbers last updated on 24 August 2013.
Note: Flags indicate national team as has been defined under FIFA eligibility rules. Players may hold more than one non-FIFA nationality.

No.	Nat.	Position	Name	Date of Birth (Age)	Signed from
Goalkeepers
Defenders
Midfielders
Forwards

== Competitions ==
=== Overview ===
Competition	Record								Started round	Final position / round	First match	Last match
Competition	G	W	D	L	GF	GA	GD	Win %	Started round	Final position / round	First match	Last match
Ligue 1	30	4	9	17	23	47	−24	13.33	—N/a	13th	24 August 2013	22 May 2014
Algerian Cup	1	0	0	1	1	2	−1	0.00	Round of 64		7 December 2013	
Total	31	4	9	18	24	49	−25	12.90				

Updated to match played 9 May 2017
Source: Competitions

== League table ==
Pos	Team	Pld	W	D	L	GF	GA	GD	Pts	Qualification or relegation
12	MC Oran	30	9	8	13	33	40	−7	35	
13	CR Belouizdad	30	9	5	16	26	33	−7	32	
14	JSM Béjaïa (R)	30	7	7	16	24	44	−20	28	Relegation to Ligue Professionnelle 2
15	CA Bordj Bou Arréridj (R)	30	4	9	17	23	47	−24	21	Relegation to Ligue Professionnelle 2
16	CRB Aïn Fakroun (R)	30	5	5	20	16	39	−23	20	Relegation to Ligue Professionnelle 2

Updated to match(es) played on 22 May 2014. Source: DZFoot
Rules for classification: 1) points; 2) head-to-head points; 3) head-to-head goal difference; 4) goal difference; 5) total goals; 6) fairplay ranking; 7) playoff.
(R) Relegated

=== Results summary ===
Overall								Home						Away					
Pld	W	D	L	GF	GA	GD	Pts	W	D	L	GF	GA	GD	W	D	L	GF	GA	GD
30	4	9	17	23	47	−24	21	3	6	6	12	18	−6	1	3	11	11	29	−18

Last updated: 29 December 2014.
Source: Competitive matches

=== Results by round ===
Round	1	2	3	4	5	6	7	8	9	10	11	12	13	14	15	16	17	18	19	20	21	22	23	24	25	26	27	28	29	30
Ground	A	H	A	H	A	H	A	H	A	H	A	H	H	A	H	H	A	H	A	H	A	H	A	H	A	H	A	A	H	A
Result	D	D	W	D	D	D	L	L	L	W	L	D	D	L	L	L	L	D	L	W	L	L	L	W	L	L	L	D	L	L
Position																														15

Updated to match(es) played on 29 December 2014. Source: Competitive matches
A = Away; H = Home; W = Win; D = Draw; L = Loss

=== Matches ===
24 August 2013 Round 1	CS Constantine	0–0	CA Bordj Bou Arréridj	Constantine
18:00		Report		Stadium: Stade Mohamed Hamlaoui; Referee: Mokhtar Amalou

31 August 2013 Round 2	CA Bordj Bou Arréridj	0–0	MC El Eulma	Bordj Bou Arréridj
17:45		Report		Stadium: Stade 20 Août 1955; Referee: Redouane Necib

3 September 2013 Round 3	USM Alger	1–3	CA Bordj Bou Arréridj	Algiers
18:00	Khoualed 68'	Report	9' (pen.), 76' Tiaiba; 90+2' Mesfar	Stadium: Stade Omar Hamadi; Referee: Mohamed Bachir

14 September 2013 Round 4	CA Bordj Bou Arréridj	0–0	CRB Aïn Fakroun	Bordj Bou Arréridj
18:00		Report		Stadium: Stade 20 Août 1955; Referee: Rafik Achouri

21 September 2013 Round 5	JSM Béjaïa	1–1	CA Bordj Bou Arréridj	Béjaïa
18:00	Coulibaly 32' (pen.)	Report	86' H. Hamiche	Stadium: Stade de l'Unité Maghrébine; Referee: Djamel Haimoudi

28 September 2013 Round 6	CA Bordj Bou Arréridj	1–1	CR Belouizdad	Bordj Bou Arréridj
18:00	Bendahmane	Report	68' Hanifi	Stadium: Stade 20 Août 1955; Referee: Mohamed Saïdi

5 October 2013 Round 7	RC Arbaâ	2–0	CA Bordj Bou Arréridj	Blida
16:00	Zeddam 39'; Abbes 67'	Report		Stadium: Stade Frères Brakni; Referee: Mohamed Bichari

19 October 2013 Round 8	CA Bordj Bou Arréridj	1–3	ASO Chlef	Bordj Bou Arréridj
18:00	Bendahmane 62'	Report	51' Zaouche; 68' Messaoud; 75' Boussaid	Stadium: Stade 20 Août 1955; Referee: Redouane Necib

26 October 2013 Round 9	MC Oran	3–2	CA Bordj Bou Arréridj	Oran
18:00	Naït Slimani 13', 23'; Nessakh 46'	Report	15' H. Hamdadou; 45+2' (pen.) Tiaïba	Stadium: Ahmed Zabana Stadium; Referee: Merzak Halalchi

2 November 2013 Round 10	CA Bordj Bou Arréridj	1–0	MC Alger	Bordj Bou Arréridj
17:00	Bachiri 8' (o.g.)	Report		Stadium: Stade 20 Août 1955; Referee: Abderrezzak Arab

9 November 2013 Round 11	JS Kabylie	2–0	CA Bordj Bou Arréridj	Tizi Ouzou
16:00	Ebossé Bodjongo 71', 80'	Report		Stadium: Stade du 1er Novembre 1954; Referee: Mohamed Sahraoui

23 November 2013 Round 12	CA Bordj Bou Arréridj	1–1	ES Sétif	Bordj Bou Arréridj
16:45	H. Hamdadou 25'	Report	70' (pen.) Gourmi	Stadium: Stade 20 Août 1955; Referee: Djamel Haimoudi

30 November 2013 Round 13	CA Bordj Bou Arréridj	0–0	USM El Harrach	Bordj Bou Arréridj
18:00		Report		Stadium: Stade 20 Août 1955; Referee: Youssef Zerrouki

14 December 2013 Round 14	MO Béjaïa	3–0	CA Bordj Bou Arréridj	Béjaïa
18:00	Yattou 12', 38'; Bouamria 27'	Report		Stadium: Stade de l'Unité Maghrébine; Referee: Mohamed Saïdi

28 December 2013 Round 15	CA Bordj Bou Arréridj	0–3	JS Saoura	Bordj Bou Arréridj
15:00		Report	58', 80' Aoudou; 84' Beldjilali	Stadium: Stade 20 Août 1955; Referee: Mohamed Bichari

18 January 2014 Round 16	CA Bordj Bou Arréridj	0–1	CS Constantine	Bordj Bou Arréridj
16:00		Report	39' Zerdab	Stadium: Stade 20 Août 1955; Referee: Merzak Halalchi

31 January 2014 Round 17	MC El Eulma	1–0	CA Bordj Bou Arréridj	El Eulma
16:00	Zeghidi 5'	Report		Stadium: Stade Messaoud Zougar; Referee: Mohamed Bichari

8 February 2014 Round 18	CA Bordj Bou Arréridj	0–0	USM Alger	Bordj Bou Arreridj
15:00		Report		Stadium: Stade 20 Août 1955; Referee: Mohamed Saïdi

14 February 2014 Round 19	CRB Aïn Fakroun	2–0	CA Bordj Bou Arréridj	Aïn M'lila
15:00	Maanser 75'; Belaâlem 90+2'	Report		Stadium: Stade des Frères Demane Debbih; Referee: Farouk Houasnia

22 February 2014 Round 20	CA Bordj Bou Arréridj	3–1	JSM Béjaïa	Bordj Bou Arréridj
15:00	Kerim 13', 48', 73'	Report	75' (pen.) O. Meddahi	Stadium: Stade 20 Août 1955; Referee: Mohamed Ghorbal

1 March 2014 Round 21	CR Belouizdad	2–0	CA Bordj Bou Arréridj	Algiers
15:00	Dahmane 47'; Khoudi 58'	Report		Stadium: Stade 20 Août 1955; Referee: Sofiane Bousseter

8 March 2014 Round 22	CA Bordj Bou Arréridj	1–3	RC Arbaâ	Bordj Bou Arréridj
15:00	Chebira 87'	Report	35' Bougueroua; 45+1' Abdelkadous; 83' (pen.) Dramé	Stadium: Stade 20 Août 1955; Referee: Mohamed Ghorbal

15 March 2014 Round 23	ASO Chlef	1–0	CA Bordj Bou Arréridj	Chlef
18:00	Boussaid 31'	Report		Stadium: Stade Mohamed Boumezrag; Referee: Lyés Bekouassa

22 March 2014 Round 24	CA Bordj Bou Arréridj	3–1	MC Oran	Bordj Bou Arréridj
15:00	N. Hamimid 9'; M. Mosrati 62'; Mansour 86'	Report	14' M. Fekih	Stadium: Stade 20 Août 1955; Referee: Lahlou Benbraham

25 April 2014 Round 25	MC Alger	1–0	CA Bordj Bou Arréridj	Algiers
17:00	Hachoud 24'	Report		Stadium: Stade Omar Hamadi; Referee: Mohamed Bachir

6 May 2014 Round 26	CA Bordj Bou Arréridj	0–1	JS Kabylie	Bordj Bou Arréridj
18:00		Report	37' Zubya	Stadium: Stade 20 Août 1955; Referee: Abderrezzak Arab

10 May 2014 Round 27	ES Sétif	4–3	CA Bordj Bou Arréridj	Sétif
18:00	Gourmi 55' (pen.); El Okbi 70'; Nadji 73'; Lamri 85'	Report	6' Bouflih; 21' Mansour; 52' Djerrar	Stadium: Stade 8 Mai 1945; Referee: Mohamed Benouza

13 May 2014 Round 28	USM El Harrach	2–2	CA Bordj Bou Arréridj	Algiers
15:00	I. Sylla 19' (pen.); A. Hattabi 65'	Report	11' Bendrima; 90+1' (pen.) Mosrati	Stadium: Stade 1er Novembre 1954; Referee: Mohamed Boukhalfa

17 May 2014 Round 29	CA Bordj Bou Arréridj	1–3	MO Béjaïa	Bordj Bou Arréridj
17:00	Bendrima 47'	Report	31', 83' Rahal; 37' Akrour	Stadium: Stade 20 Août 1955; Referee: Merzak Halalchi

24 May 2014 Round 30	JS Saoura	4–0	CA Bordj Bou Arréridj	Béchar
17:00	M. Mebarki 41'; K. Toubel 65'; Hamzaoui 83'; Bouguelmouna 86'	Report		Stadium: Stade 20 Août 1955; Referee: Boussaid

== Algerian Cup ==
6 December 2013 Round of 64	US Chaouia	2–1	CA Bordj Bou Arréridj	Oum El Bouaghi
14:30	Khouja 33'; Mhemdati 42'	Repport	Bendahmane 90+4'	Stadium: Stade Hassouna-Zerdani

== Squad information ==
=== Playing statistics ===
No.	Pos	Nat	Player	Total		Ligue 1		Algerian Cup	
No.	Pos	Nat	Player	Apps	Goals	Apps	Goals	Apps	Goals
Goalkeepers
1	GK	(Algeria) ALG	Hassane Toual	3	0	3	0	0	0
85	GK	(Algeria) ALG	Nassim Benkhodja	21	0	21	0	0	0
34	GK	(Algeria) ALG	Abdel Souiche	5	0	5	0	0	0
	GK	(Algeria) ALG	Khalil Djebri	1	0	1	0	0	0
Defenders
13	DF	(Algeria) ALG	Abdelhak Mansour	19	2	19	2	0	0
4	DF	(Algeria) ALG	Abdelkrim Mammeri	21	0	21	0	0	0
27	DF	(Algeria) ALG	Abdellah Chebira	20	1	20	1	0	0
23	DF	(Algeria) ALG	Abdelaziz Ali Guechi	20	0	20	0	0	0
31	DF	(Algeria) ALG	Hamza Hamdadou	17	2	17	2	0	0
2	DF	(Algeria) ALG	Toufik Charef	3	0	3	0	0	0
	DF	(Algeria) ALG	Mebarkia	4	0	4	0	0	0
	DF	(Algeria) ALG	Mebarek Belkacemi	2	0	2	0	0	0
	DF	(Algeria) ALG	Amar Mira	1	0	1	0	0	0
	DF	(Algeria) ALG	Ramzi Madhoui	1	0	1	0	0	0
Midfielders
8	MF	(Algeria) ALG	Lounés Bendahmane	24	2	24	2	0	0
21	MF	(Algeria) ALG	Abdelkrim Oudni	14	0	14	0	0	0
88	MF	(Chad) CHA	Yaya Kerim	20	3	20	3	0	0
14	MF	(Algeria) ALG	Mohamed Saadi	15	0	15	0	0	0
3	MF	(Algeria) ALG	Adel Djerrar	19	1	19	1	0	0
	MF	(Algeria) ALG	Ayoub Ferhat	5	0	5	0	0	0
	MF	(Algeria) ALG	Mehdi Benhaddouche	5	0	5	0	0	0
	MF	(Algeria) ALG	Houari Hamiche	9	1	9	1	0	0
10	MF	(Algeria) ALG	Sofiane Ammour	21	0	21	0	0	0
11	MF	(Algeria) ALG	Nour El Islam Hamimed	16	1	16	1	0	0
	MF	(Algeria) ALG	Tarek Bouflih	9	1	9	1	0	0
92	MF	(Algeria) ALG	Oussama Bouguerra	15	0	15	0	0	0
54	MF	(Algeria) ALG	Ahmed Benhemine	14	0	14	0	0	0
	MF	(Algeria) ALG	Ammar Bendrima	4	2	4	2	0	0
	MF	(Algeria) ALG	Sofiane Bouamrane	1	0	1	0	0	0
	MF	(Algeria) ALG	Oussalah	4	0	4	0	0	0
	MF	(Algeria) ALG	Boubaya	1	0	1	0	0	0
	MF	(Algeria) ALG	Lakhdar Ketfi	1	0	1	0	0	0
Forwards
	FW	(Algeria) ALG	Mohamed Tiaiba	14	3	14	3	0	0
17	FW	(Tunisia) TUN	Mejdi Mosrati	22	2	22	2	0	0
30	FW	(Algeria) ALG	Mohamed Noureddine Bennai	22	0	22	0	0	0
7	FW	(Algeria) ALG	Oussama Mesfar	19	1	19	1	0	0
	FW	(Algeria) ALG	Makhlouf Rechrech	4	0	4	0	0	0
	FW	(Algeria) ALG	Abdelmoumene Hadroug	1	0	1	0	0	0
Players transferred out during the season

Last updated: 14 November 2017
Source: fr.soccerway.com

== Transfers ==
=== In ===
Date	Pos	Player	From club	Transfer fee	Source
1 July 2013	GK	(Algeria) (Russia) Nassim Benkhodja	ES Sétif	Free transfer	
1 July 2013	GK	(Algeria) (France) Abdel Souiche	(France) AS Fresnoy	Undisclosed	
1 July 2013	MF	(Algeria) Nour El Islam Hamimed	Reserve team	First Professional Contract	
1 July 2013	FW	(Algeria) Oussama Bouguerra	Reserve team	First Professional Contract	
9 July 2013	DF	(Algeria) Abdelkrim Mammeri	ES Sétif	Free transfer	
9 July 2013	MF	(Algeria) Ayoub Ferhat	CS Constantine	Undisclosed	
10 July 2013	MF	(Chad) Yaya Kerim	USM El Harrach	Free transfer	
15 July 2013	GK	(Algeria) Hassane Toual	RC Arbaâ	Undisclosed	
27 July 2013	FW	(Algeria) Mohamed Tiaiba	CS Constantine	Undisclosed	
28 July 2013	MF	(Algeria) Mohamed Noureddine Bennai	CS Constantine	Free transfer	
30 July 2013	MF	(Algeria) Houari Hamiche	CS Constantine	Free transfer	
16 December 2013	DF	(Algeria) (France) Ahmed Benhemine	CS&O Blénod PaM	Free transfer	
1 January 2014	MF	(Algeria) Tarek Bouflih	Reserve team	First Professional Contract	
1 January 2014	MF	(Algeria) (France) Makhlouf Rechrech	(France) AC Arles-Avignon B	Free transfer	
1 January 2014	FW	(Algeria) (France) Mehdi Benhaddouche	(Switzerland) Yverdon Sport FC	Free transfer	

=== Out ===
Date	Pos	Player	To club	Transfer fee	Source
15 January 2014	FW	(Algeria) Mohamed Tiaiba	ES Sétif	2,300,000 DA	
