= 2012–13 CA Bordj Bou Arréridj season =

CA Bordj Bou Arréridj
2012–13 season
- Head coach: Toufik Rouabah (from 24 June 2012) (until 1 October 2012); Abdelaziz Abbès (from 2 October 2012) (until 20 January 2013); Abdelkader Amrani (from 20 January 2013)
- Stadium: Stade 20 Août 1955
- Ligue 1: 13th
- Algerian Cup: Round of 32
- Top goalscorer: League: Sofiane Ammour (3); Oussama Mesfar (3); Majdi Mosrati (3); All: Sofiane Ammour (3); Oussama Mesfar (3); Majdi Mosrati (3)

In the 2012–13 season, CA Bordj Bou Arréridj is competing in the Ligue 1 for the 12th season, as well as the Algerian Cup. It is their 13th consecutive season in the top flight of Algerian football. They will be competing in Ligue 1, and the Algerian Cup.

== Squad list ==
Players and squad numbers last updated on 18 November 2010.
Note: Flags indicate national team as has been defined under FIFA eligibility rules. Players may hold more than one non-FIFA nationality.

No.	Nat.	Position	Name	Date of Birth (Age)	Signed from
Goalkeepers
Defenders
Midfielders
Forwards

== Competitions ==
=== Overview ===
Competition	Record								Started round	Final position / round	First match	Last match
Competition	G	W	D	L	GF	GA	GD	Win %	Started round	Final position / round	First match	Last match
Ligue 1	30	7	12	11	20	26	−6	23.33	—N/a	13th	15 September 2012	21 May 2013
Algerian Cup	2	1	0	1	2	3	−1	50.00	Round of 64	Round of 32	14 December 2012	29 December 2012
Total	32	8	12	12	22	29	−7	25.00				

Updated to match played 9 May 2017
Source: Competitions

== League table ==
Pos	Team	Pld	W	D	L	GF	GA	GD	Pts	Qualification or relegation
11	JSM Béjaïa	30	9	11	10	28	32	−4	38	
12	MC Oran	30	8	10	12	33	41	−8	34	
13	CA Bordj Bou Arréridj	30	7	12	11	20	26	−6	33	
14	CA Batna (R)	30	6	8	16	20	46	−26	26	Relegation to Ligue Professionnelle 2
15	WA Tlemcen (R)	30	6	6	18	19	43	−24	24	Relegation to Ligue Professionnelle 2

Updated to match(es) played on 21 May 2013. Source: DZFoot
Rules for classification: 1) points; 2) head-to-head points; 3) head-to-head goal difference; 4) goal difference; 5) total goals; 6) fairplay ranking; 7) playoff.
(R) Relegated

=== Results summary ===
Overall								Home						Away					
Pld	W	D	L	GF	GA	GD	Pts	W	D	L	GF	GA	GD	W	D	L	GF	GA	GD
30	7	12	11	20	26	−6	33	5	7	3	11	7	+4	2	5	8	9	19	−10

Last updated: 29 December 2014.
Source: Competitive matches

=== Results by round ===
Round	1	2	3	4	5	6	7	8	9	10	11	12	13	14	15	16	17	18	19	20	21	22	23	24	25	26	27	28	29	30
Ground	A	H	A	H	A	H	A	H	A	H	A	H	A	A	H	H	A	H	A	H	A	H	A	H	A	H	A	H	H	A
Result	D	L	D	L	W	D	W	W	L	D	L	W	D	L	D	D	L	W	L	D	D	L	D	D	L	W	L	W	D	L
Position	6	11	13	14	11	12	10	7	10	10	11	9	8	11	11	11	11	11	11	11	11	12	12	12	12	12	12	12	12	13

Source: Competitive matches
A = Away; H = Home; W = Win; D = Draw; L = Loss

=== Matches ===
15 September 2012 Round 1	CA Batna	1–1	CA Bordj Bou Arreridj	Batna
18:00	Boulaïnceur 64'	Report	32' Ammour	Stadium: November 1, 1954 Stadium; Referee: Merzak Halalchi

18 September 2012 Round 2	CA Bordj Bou Arréridj	0–1	USM El Harrach	Bordj Bou Arréridj
20:30		Report	39' Kerim	Stadium: Stade 20 Août 1955; Referee: Youssef Zerrouki

22 September 2012 Round 3	WA Tlemcen	0–0	CA Bordj Bou Arreridj	Tlemcen
18:00		Report		Stadium: Stade Akid Lotfi; Referee: Farouk Mial

29 September 2012 Round 4	CA Bordj Bou Arréridj	0–1	JS Saoura	Bordj Bou Arréridj
18:00		Report	3' Beldjilali	Stadium: Stade 20 Août 1955; Referee: Mokhtar Amalou

6 October 2012 Round 5	USM Alger	0–1	CA Bordj Bou Arreridj	Algiers
18:00		Report	Chebira 2'	Stadium: Stade Omar Hamadi; Referee: Mohamed Bachir

16 October 2012 Round 6	CA Bordj Bou Arreridj	1–1	MC Oran	Bordj Bou Arréridj
18:00	Bekhtaoui 35'	Report	21' Sebbah	Stadium: Stade 20 Août 1955; Referee: Sofiane Bousseter

20 October 2012 Round 7	ASO Chlef	0–1	CA Bordj Bou Arreridj	Chlef
18:00		Report	25' (pen.) Mesfar	Stadium: Stade Mohamed Boumezrag; Referee: Redouane Necib

23 October 2012 Round 8	CA Bordj Bou Arreridj	2–0	USM Bel-Abbès	Bordj Bou Arréridj
18:00	Mesfar 2'; Mosrati 83'	Report		Stadium: Stade 20 Août 1955; Referee: Mohamed Bichari

3 November 2012 Round 9	JSM Béjaïa	1–0	CA Bordj Bou Arreridj	Béjaïa
18:00	Mebarki 18'	Report		Stadium: Stade de l'Unité Maghrébine; Referee: Mohamed Ghorbal

10 November 2012 Round 10	CA Bordj Bou Arréridj	1–1	CS Constantine	Bordj Bou Arréridj
18:00	Belkheïr 69'	Report	64' Belakhdar	Stadium: Stade 20 Août 1955; Referee: Merzak Halalchi

17 November 2012 Round 11	CR Belouizdad	2–1	CA Bordj Bou Arréridj	Belouizdad
15:00	Rebih 12', 15'	Report	60' Essifi	Stadium: Stade 20 Août 1955; Referee: Mohamed Bachir

23 November 2012 Round 12	CA Bordj Bou Arreridj	1–0	JS Kabylie	Bordj Bou Arréridj
16:00	Bendahmane 35'	Report		Stadium: Stade 20 Août 1955; Referee: Mohamed Sahraoui

1 December 2012 Round 13	MC Alger	1–1	CA Bordj Bou Arréridj	Algiers
15:00	Bachiri 30'	Report	41' Ammour	Stadium: July 5, 1962 Stadium; Referee: Khaled Saâdi

8 December 2012 Round 14	ES Sétif	3–1	CA Bordj Bou Arréridj	Sétif
17:45	Benabderahmane 27'; Karaoui 35'; Aoudia 76' (pen.)	Report	40' Djarrar	Stadium: Stade 8 Mai 1945; Referee: Mehdi Abid Charef

22 December 2012 Round 15	CA Bordj Bou Arréridj	0–0	MC El Eulma	Bordj Bou Arréridj
18:00		Report		Stadium: Stade 20 Août 1955; Referee: Farouk Mial

15 January 2013 Round 16	CA Bordj Bou Arréridj	0–0	CA Batna	Bordj Bou Arréridj
18:00		Report		Stadium: Stade 20 Août 1955; Referee: Mohamed Saïdi

19 January 2013 Round 17	USM El Harrach	2–1	CA Bordj Bou Arréridj	Algiers
15:00	Younes 26'; Chebira 68' (o.g.)	Report	90' Mesfar	Stadium: Stade 1er Novembre 1954; Referee: Merzak Halalchi

26 January 2013 Round 18	CA Bordj Bou Arréridj	2–1	WA Tlemcen	Bordj Bou Arréridj
15:00	Belkheïr 15'; Mosrati 45'	Report	71' Benai	Stadium: Stade 20 Août 1955; Referee: Abderrezzak Arab

2 February 2013 Round 19	JS Saoura	2–0	CA Bordj Bou Arréridj	Béchar
15:00	Beldjilali 29'; Belkheir 51'	Report		Stadium: Stade 20 Août 1955; Referee: Youssef Zerrouki

8 February 2013 Round 20	CA Bordj Bou Arreridj	1–1	USM Alger	Bordj Bou Arréridj
15:00	Bendahmane 12'	Report	67' Boudebouda	Stadium: Stade 20 Août 1955; Referee: Mohamed Ghorbal

16 February 2013 Round 21	MC Oran	0–0	CA Bordj Bou Arreridj	Oran
15:00		Report		Stadium: Ahmed Zabana Stadium; Referee: Farouk Houasnia

23 February 2013 Round 22	CA Bordj Bou Arreridj	0–1	ASO Chlef	Bordj Bou Arréridj
15:00		Report	71' (pen.) Messaoud	Stadium: Stade 20 Août 1955; Referee: Farouk Mial

9 March 2013 Round 23	USM Bel-Abbès	1–1	CA Bordj Bou Arreridj	Sidi Bel Abbès
15:00	El Bahari 43'	Report	49' Ammour	Stadium: Stade 24 Fevrier 1956; Referee: Mokhtar Amalou

19 March 2013 Round 24	CA Bordj Bou Arreridj	0–0	JSM Béjaïa	Bordj Bou Arréridj
18:00		Report		Stadium: Stade 20 Août 1955; Referee: Mohamed Saïdi

6 April 2013 Round 25	CS Constantine	1–0	CA Bordj Bou Arréridj	Constantine
18:45	Djilali 27'	Report		Stadium: Stade Mohamed Hamlaoui; Referee: Mohamed Bachir

20 April 2013 Round 26	CA Bordj Bou Arréridj	1–0	CR Belouizdad	Bordj Bou Arréridj
16:00	Chebira 33'	Report		Stadium: Stade 20 Août 1955; Referee: Djamel Haimoudi

4 May 2013 Round 27	JS Kabylie	2–0	CA Bordj Bou Arreridj	Tizi Ouzou
16:00	Mokdad 56'; Messadia 70'	Report		Stadium: Stade 1er Novembre 1954; Referee: Youssef Zerrouki

11 May 2013 Round 28	CA Bordj Bou Arréridj	2–0	MC Alger	Bordj Bou Arréridj
17:00	Ali Guechi 59'; Saâdi 76'	Report		Stadium: Stade 20 Août 1955; Referee: Mohamed Bachir

14 May 2013 Round 29	CA Bordj Bou Arréridj	0–0	ES Sétif	Bordj Bou Arréridj
17:00		Report		Stadium: Stade 20 Août 1955; Referee: Djamel Haimoudi

21 May 2013 Round 30	MC El Eulma	3–1	CA Bordj Bou Arréridj	El Eulma
17:00	Hamiti 18'; Derrardja 42'; Chenihi 53'	Report	86' (pen.) Mosrati	Stadium: Stade Messaoud Zougar; Referee: Said Aouina

== Algerian Cup ==
14 December 2012 Round of 64	CA Bordj Bou Arreridj	2–1	WRB M'sila	Bordj Bou Arréridj
15:00	Hamdadou 87'; Benchrgui 90'	Repport	34' Gasmi	Stadium: Stade 20 Août 1955; Attendance: 0 (close doors); Referee: Hakim Bouchama

29 December 2012 Round of 32	USM Blida	2–0	CA Bordj Bou Arreridj	Blida
14:00	Ouznadji 7'; Boudina 90'	Repport		Stadium: Brakni Brothers Stadium; Referee: Farouk Houasnia

== Squad information ==
=== Playing statistics ===
No.	Pos	Nat	Player	Total		Ligue 1		Algerian Cup	
No.	Pos	Nat	Player	Apps	Goals	Apps	Goals	Apps	Goals
Goalkeepers
16	GK	(Algeria) ALG	Ahmed Fellah	14	0	14	0	0	0
22	GK	(Algeria) ALG	Chouaib Kracheni	1	0	1	0	0	0
1	GK	(Algeria) ALG	Nabil Naili	17	0	17	0	0	0
Defenders
5	DF	(Algeria) ALG	Djamel Benchergui	16	0	16	0	0	0
13	DF	(Algeria) ALG	Abdelhak Mansour	20	0	20	0	0	0
27	DF	(Algeria) ALG	Abdellah Chebira	25	2	25	2	0	0
23	DF	(Algeria) ALG	Abdelaziz Ali Guechi	20	1	20	1	0	0
24	DF	(Algeria) ALG	Hamza Hamdadou	14	0	14	0	0	0
4	DF	(Algeria) ALG	Mohamed Bekhtaoui	18	1	18	1	0	0
	DF	(Algeria) ALG	Ismail Chikhaoui	1	0	1	0	0	0
Midfielders
18	MF	(Algeria) ALG	Abdelhak Mohamed Rabah	12	0	12	0	0	0
8	MF	(Algeria) ALG	Lounés Bendahmane	29	2	29	2	0	0
21	MF	(Algeria) ALG	Abdelkrim Oudni	16	0	16	0	0	0
14	MF	(Algeria) ALG	Mohamed Saadi	26	1	26	1	0	0
3	MF	(Algeria) ALG	Adel Djerrar	27	1	27	1	0	0
10	MF	(Algeria) ALG	Sofiane Ammour	28	3	28	3	0	0
	MF	(Algeria) ALG	Nour El Islam Hamimed	3	0	3	0	0	0
	MF	(Algeria) ALG	Tarek Bouflih	2	0	2	0	0	0
	MF	(Algeria) ALG	Oussama Bouguerra	1	0	1	0	0	0
Forwards
34	FW	(Algeria) ALG	Mohamed Amine Belkheïr	26	2	26	2	0	0
6	FW	(Tunisia) TUN	Mejdi Mosrati	28	3	28	3	0	0
9	FW	(Tunisia) TUN	Hichem Essifi	12	1	12	1	0	0
7	FW	(Algeria) ALG	Oussama Mesfar	28	3	28	3	0	0
20	FW	(Algeria) ALG	Sofiane Louz	9	0	9	0	0	0
11	FW	(Algeria) ALG	Walid Belguerfi	10	0	10	0	0	0
13	FW	(Algeria) ALG	Billal Ziani	14	0	14	0	0	0
Players transferred out during the season

Last updated: 2 December 2017
Source: fr.soccerway.com

=== Goalscorers ===
Includes all competitive matches. The list is sorted alphabetically by surname when total goals are equal.

No.	Nat.	Player	Pos.	L 1	AC	TOTAL
6	(Tunisia)	Mejdi Mosrati	FW	3	0	3
7	(Algeria)	Oussama Mesfar	FW	3	0	3
10	(Algeria)	Sofiane Ammour	FW	3	0	3
8	(Algeria)	Lounés Bendahmane	MF	2	0	2
34	(Algeria)	Mohamed Amine Belkheïr	FW	2	0	2
27	(Algeria)	Abdellah Chebira	DF	2	0	2
14	(Algeria)	Mohamed Saadi	MF	1	0	1
3	(Algeria)	Adel Djerrar	MF	1	0	1
9	(Tunisia)	Hichem Essifi	FW	1	0	1
23	(Algeria)	Abdelaziz Ali Guechi	DF	1	0	1
4	(Algeria)	Mohamed Bekhtaoui	DF	1	0	1
24	(Algeria)	Hamza Hamdadou	DF	0	1	1
5	(Algeria)	Djamel Benchergui	DF	0	1	1
Own Goals				0	0	0
Totals				20	2	22

== Transfers ==
=== In ===
Date	Pos	Player	From club	Transfer fee	Source
16 June 2012	FW	(Algeria) Oussama Mesfar	AS Khroub	Free transfer	
23 June 2012	DF	(Algeria) Abdelaziz Ali Guechi	USM Annaba	Free transfer	
23 June 2012	DF	(Algeria) Abdellah Chebira	USM Blida	Free transfer	
11 July 2012	FW	(Tunisia) Hichem Essifi	(Tunisia) Olympique Béja	Free transfer	
15 August 2012	MF	(Tunisia) Mejdi Mosrati	(Tunisia) Stade Tunisien	€50,000	
