= Bechir Seid Djimet =

Chadian footballer (born 1994)

Personal information
- Full name: Bechir Seid Djimet Abdoulaye (Note: Some sources claim his name to be Bechir Dijmet Seid Abdoulaye.)
- Date of birth: 10 January 1994 (age 32) (Note: Some sources claim that he is born on 10 January 1997.)
- Place of birth: N'Djamena, Chad
- Position: Centre-back

Team information
- Current team: Elect-Sport

Senior career*
Years	Team	Apps	(Gls)
2014–2021	Elect-Sport		
2021–	Eding Sport		

International career^{‡}
2019–2020	Chad	9	(2)
- * Club domestic league appearances and goals ‡ National team caps and goals as of 03:04, 24 February 2022 (UTC)

Bechir Seid Djimet Abdoulaye (Arabic: بشير سيد جمعة عبد الله; born 10 January 1994) is a Chadian professional footballer who plays as a centre-back for Elite One club Eding Sport.

== Honours ==
Elect-Sport FC

- Chad Premier League: 2018, 2019
- Coupe de Ligue de N'Djamena: 2014
