= César Madalngué =

Chadian footballer (born 1987)

Personal information
- Date of birth: 9 December 1987 (age 38)
- Place of birth: N'Djaména, Chad
- Height: 1.73 m (5 ft 8 in)
- Positions: Right back; left back

Senior career*
Years	Team	Apps	(Gls)
2006–2009	Renaissance FC		
2009–2013	Gazelle FC		
2013–2015	AS CotonTchad		
2016	Gazelle FC		

International career
2007–2012	Chad	14	(0)
- * Club domestic league appearances and goals

César Madalngué (born 9 December 1987) is a Chadian football defender and the member of Chad national football team. He has 14 caps for national team, and he was a part of qualifying campaign for 2010 World Cup.

== Club career ==
Madalngué started his career in Renaissance FC, after he went to Gazelle FC, where he won two Chad Premier League titles, in 2009 and 2012. From 2013, he played for AS CotonTchad, only to finalize his career with one extra year in Gazelle.

== International career ==
Madalngué debuted in a friendly match against Benin in 2007. Soon after that, he played on 2007 CEMAC Cup, where he played all 4 games (2 games against Central African Republic, Gabon and Cameroon). Also, he played 2 games against South Africa (0-3 and 0-4 losses) and 2 ACN 2008 qualification matches against Zambia and Congo. His next 2 games came in 2010 FIFA World Cup qualification, against Congo and Sudan. In 2010, he played friendly match against Niger, and 2012 Africa Cup of Nations qualification match against Botswana. In 2011, he played against Malawi in N'Djamena, and in 2012 against Malawi in 3-2 win. That is 14 matches in total, as Cameroon match in CEMAC 2007 is not considered official.

== See also ==
- List of Chad international footballers
