= 2020 LINAFOOT (Chad) =

LINAFOOT
- Season: 2020
- Dates: 27 September 2020 – 8 October 2020
- Champions: Gazelle; 2nd LINAFOOT title 4th Chadian title
- Champions League: Gazelle
- Confederation Cup: Renaissance FC
- Matches: 26
- Biggest home win: AS CotonTchad 8-0 As Santos Moussoro (5 October 2020)
- Highest scoring: AS CotonTchad 9-2 As Mine Faya (30 September 2020)
- Longest unbeaten run: 5 games Gazelle; Renaissance FC

The 2020 LINAFOOT was the 4th season of the LINAFOOT, the top Chadian league for association football clubs since its establishment in 2015.

Unlike the 1st LINAFOOT edition (in 2015) organised as a full national championship and won by Gazelle FC, this edition was organized under the play-off formula.

Delayed due to the Covid-19 pandemic, the season started on 27 September 2020 and concluded on 8 October 2020.

Gazelle won their fourth Chadian title.

== Events ==
In zone 1, Mirim Mongo was the representative; Renaissance FC Abéché, as a champion, was zone 2 representative. The zone 3 was represented by its champion As Santos Moussoro. In zone 4, Espoir FC Bongor and AS Mairie Binder were the two representatives. Zone 5 also had two representatives, those were Or Noir FC from Doba and Djarabé FC from Moundou. AS Mine Faya was the winner, and the representative of zone 6.

On September 2, 2020 RFC Abéché obtained its ticket for the final phase of the National Football League in N'Djamena. Placed in zone 2 with the RFC Goz Beida and the Lions Biltine, Renaissance football club of Abéché snatched its qualification by occupying the head of the standings with 4 points. The club secured the qualification by playing 0–0 with RFC Goz Beida, after the victory by forfeit against the Lions Biltine due to lack of licenses from the latter. Lions Biltine won against RFC Goz Beida by 4–1. Thus, Lions Biltine and RFC Goz Beida were eliminated with respectively 3 and 1 points.

Started on August 26 as announced, the zonal championship in zone 5 ended on August 30, at the Municipal Stadium of Moundou, capital of the province of Logone Occidental. After two matches played by each of these three teams representing Mandoul, Logone Oriental and Logone Occidental, it was Or Noir FC Doba and Djarabé FC Moundou who obtained their qualifying tickets with 4 and 3 points respectively, in front of Ared FC Koumra who finished last with 1 point.

On September 26, 2020, the Linafoot proceeded to the drawing of lots for the 12 teams representing 7 zones qualified for the final phase of the national championship.

The playoff started on 27 September 2020 and concluded on 8 October 2020. The twelve teams were divided into two groups of six teams. The matches were played at three stadiums: Stade d'Académie de Farcha, Stade Omnisports Idriss Mahamat Ouya and Stade de Paris-Congo. All matches were being played at 03:30 p.m. local time.

== Teams ==
A total of 12 teams competed in the tournament:

- As Mirim Mongo (Guéra) (zone 1)
- RFC Abéché (Ouaddaï) (zone 2)
- As Lion Moussoro (Barh El Hazel) (zone 3)
- Espoir FC Bongor (Mayo-Kebbi est) (zone 4)
- As Mairie Binder (Mayo-Kebbi ouest) (zone 4)
- Or Noir FC Doba (Logone Oriental) (zone 5)
- Djarabé FC Moundou (Logone Occidental) (zone 5)
- As Mine Faya-Largeau (Borkou) (zone 6)
- Foullah Edifice FC (zone 7)
- AS CotonTchad (zone 7)
- Renaissance FC (zone 7)
- Gazelle FC (zone 7)

== Group stage ==
The 12 teams were divided into two groups of six teams. The top team of each group qualified for the final. The group stage matches started on 27 September 2020. Matches were being played at 3:30 p.m. local time. Considering the decision of the Homologation, Litigation and Disciplinary Committee which withdrew all points from the Foullah Édifice FC club regarding the Bakhit Djibrine case, Gazelle FC was placed 1st in the pool and qualified for the final. The final was played between Gazelle and Renaissance FC on October 8, 2020 at the Idriss Mahamat Ouya stadium. After 1–1 in a 90 minutes of the game, penalty shootout was being played, which Gazelle won 8–7, and became a national champion.

Group A:

- AS CotonTchad
- Foullah Edifice FC
- As Mine Faya-Largeau
- As Santos Moussoro
- As Mirim Mongo
- Gazelle FC

Group B:

- Espoir FC Bongor
- As Mairie Binder
- Renaissance FC
- Or Noir FC Doba
- Djarabé FC Moundou
- RFC Abéché

== Final ==
8 October 2020
3:30 p.m. local time

| Gazelle | 1–1 (8-7 pen.) | Renaissance FC |
|---|---|---|
| Yannick Masra 9' | | Abbo 11' |

Stade Omnisports Idriss Mahamat Ouya
- Gazelle qualified for the 2020–21 CAF Champions League.
- Renaissance FC qualified for the 2020–21 CAF Confederation Cup.

== Final clubs' stadiums ==
| Team | Location | Stadium | Capacity |
|---|---|---|---|
| Gazelle FC | N'Djamena | Stade Omnisports Idriss Mahamat Ouya | 20,000 |
| Renaissance FC | N'Djamena | Stade Omnisports Idriss Mahamat Ouya | 20,000 |

== Controversies ==
=== Case Bakhit ===
Homologation, Litigation and Discipline Commission suspended Foullah Edifice player Bakhit Djibrine due to double license, resulting in Foullah Edifice losing all its matches by forfeit. The player already had a license signed in France in July. Despite this, he signed a second license at the same time in Chad with Foullah and played this championship. As the player cannot have two licenses at the same time, Foullah sees all its points withdrawn from the matches where Bakhit has played, and he played every game.
