= Ndakom Valerie Ndeidoum =

Chadian footballer (born 1981)

Valérie Ndeidoum
Personal information
- Full name: Valérie Ndakom Ndeidoum
- Date of birth: July 14, 1981 (age 45)
- Place of birth: N'Djamena, Chad
- Height: 1.88 m (6 ft 2 in)
- Position: Goalkeeper

Youth career
- 1999–2000: A.S. Kaleta

Senior career*
Years	Team	Apps	(Gls)
2001–2004	Gazelle	55	(0)
2005–2007	Delta Téléstar	44	(0)
2008–2010	Tourbillon	38	(0)
2010–2013	Renaissance FC		

International career
2003–2010	Chad	10	(0)
- * Club domestic league appearances and goals

Valérie Ndakom Ndeidoum (born July 14, 1981 in N'Djamena) is a retired Chadian goalkeeper.

== Career ==
The goalkeeper played for Tourbillon and Gazelle FC in the Chadian Premier League and for Delta Téléstar Gabon Télécom FC in the Gabon Championnat National D1. He finished his career in Renaissance FC.

== International career ==
He has played for the Chad national football team. He was the part of 2006 and 2010 FIFA World Cup qualifiers and 2012 Africa Cup of Nations qualifiers. He played for the side the finished runners-up at the 2005 CEMAC Cup.
