= Armel Koulara =

Chadian footballer (born 1989)

Personal information
- Full name: Armel N'Dinga Koulara Kwanyéllé
- Date of birth: 15 August 1989 (age 37)
- Place of birth: N'Djamena, Chad
- Height: 1.83 m (6 ft 0 in)
- Position: Goalkeeper

Youth career
- 1998–2000: Faucon Sporting
- 2000–2004: Gazelle

Senior career*
Years	Team	Apps	(Gls)
2004–2010	Gazelle	98	(11)
2010–2013	Tourbillon		
2013–2014	AS CotonTchad		

International career^{‡}
2005–2012	Chad	14	(0)
- * Club domestic league appearances and goals ‡ National team caps and goals as of 5 July 2012

Armel N'Dinga Koulara Kwanyéllé (born 15 August 1989; known simply as Armel Koulara and occasionally Armel Kwanyéllé) is a Chadian former footballer who played as a goalkeeper.

== Attributes ==
An agile and sprightly goalkeeper in addition to being a penalty specialist, Armel was Gazelle's first choice penalty taker, following in the footsteps of other goal-scoring 'keepers such as Rogério Ceni, Vincent Enyeama, Hans-Jörg Butt and José Luis Chilavert. Armel has scored 11 goals for Gazelle, all of them penalty kicks; however his penalty taking privileges did not extend to the Chad national football team, for whom he has 14 caps, with Misdongard Betoligar occupying the role for the Sao.

== See also ==
- List of Chad international footballers
