= Esaïe Djikoloum =

Chadian footballer (born 1991)

Personal information
- Date of birth: 3 October 1991 (age 35)
- Place of birth: N'Djamena, Chad
- Height: 1.70 m (5 ft 7 in)
- Position: Striker

Team information
- Current team: CotonTchad
- Number: 9

Youth career
- 2005–2007: CotonTchad

Senior career*
Years	Team	Apps	(Gls)
2007–2009	Renaissance		
2010–	CotonTchad		

International career^{‡}
2007–	Chad	8	(0)
- * Club domestic league appearances and goals as of 1 September 2015 ‡ National team caps and goals as of 1 September 2015

Esaïe Djikoloum (born 3 October 1991) is a Chadian footballer who plays as a striker for CotonTchad.

== Career ==
In 2005-2006 he scored 14 goals in 22 matches. At the age of 14, he was the youngest goalking ever. Djikoloum have won Chadian league with RFC in 2007. In 2009, Esaïe won Chad Cup and Coupe de Ligue de N'Djaména with CotonTchad, and then played in 2010 CAF Confederation Cup preliminary round. He is the captain of CotonTchad.

== International career ==
At the age of 16, Djikoloum represented his home land at African Cup of Nations, in August 2006. In September 2006 he played with the Olympic team in the Zone IV (ACNOA) in Congo (Brazzaville). In 2007, he played his second African Cup of Nations.

He debuted for Chadian senior team in a match against South Africa on 2 June 2007. Until now, he earned 8 FIFA official and two unofficial caps.

== See also ==
- List of Chad international footballers
