= Geyser (disambiguation) =

A geyser is a periodic steam hot spring.

Geyser may also refer to:

- A cold-water geyser, driven by trapped CO_{2} instead of steam
- A blowhole or "marine geyser," a lava tube that funnels wave-driven sea water through a narrow orifice

== People ==
- Albert Geyser (1918–1985), South African theologian
- Albert C. Geyser (fl. 1905), American physician
- Jacqui Geyser (born 1974), South African field hockey player
- Riad Michael, German electronic musician

== Vessels ==
- HMS Geyser (1841), a wooden paddle sloop of the Royal Navy, in service 1841–1866
- Geyser (fireboat, 1886), one of Chicago's first fireboats
- Geyser (fireboat, 1889), a fireboat built for Bay City, Michigan
- MV Geysir, a U.S.-flagged cargo ship

== Other uses ==
- Geyser (Mars), a type of gas and dust eruption in the south polar region of Mars
- The Geysers, a northern California geothermal plant
- Geyser FC, a football club based in N'Djamena, Chad
- Geyser, Montana, United States
- "Geyser", a song by Mitski from Be the Cowboy (2018)
- Geyser, a term used for a domestic storage water heater, particularly in South Africa and India

== See also ==
- Geysir, a hot spring in Iceland
- List of geysers
- Geezer (disambiguation)
