= Hisseine Djiddo =

Chadian footballer (born 1978)

Personal information
- Full name: Djiddo Hissein Yanta
- Date of birth: 3 December 1972 (age 53)
- Place of birth: N'Djamena, Chad
- Position: Defender

Senior career*
Years	Team	Apps	(Gls)
1992–1999	Gazelle FC		
1999–2009	Tourbillon FC		

International career^{‡}
1997–2003	Chad	11	(0)
- * Club domestic league appearances and goals ‡ National team caps and goals as of 12 February 2026

Hisseine Djiddo (born 3 December 1978) is a former Chadian professional football player. He made 11 appearances for the Chad national team between 1997 and 2003.

In 2021, the IFFHS listed Djiddo in their men's all-time Chad dream team.

== See also ==
- List of Chad international footballers
