= US de Moursal =

Chadian football club

USM FC (Chad)
- Full name: US de Moursal
- Ground: Stade Omnisports Idriss Mahamat Ouya; N'Djamena, Chad
- Capacity: 30.000
- Manager: ?
- League: Chad Premier League

US de Moursal is a football club from Chad based in N'Djamena.

In 2013 the team has played in Chad Premier League.

== Stadium ==
The club plays home matches on Stade Omnisports Idriss Mahamat Ouya.
