= Yaya Kerim =

Chadian footballer (born 1991)

Personal information
- Full name: Yaya Kerim
- Date of birth: 10 August 1991 (age 35)
- Place of birth: N'Djamena, Chad
- Height: 1.82 m (6 ft 0 in)
- Positions: Striker; midfielder; defender

Team information
- Current team: Renaissance
- Number: 88

Senior career*
| Years | Team | Apps | (Gls) |
| –2010 | Gazelle | | |
| 2010–2011 | Renaissance | | |
| 2011–2013 | USM El Harrach | 35 | (10) |
| 2013–2015 | CA Bordj Bou Arréridj | 20 | (3) |
| 2015– | Renaissance | | |

International career^{‡}
| 2010– | Chad | 7 | (0) |
- * Club domestic league appearances and goals as of 1 September 2015 ‡ National team caps and goals as of 7 September 2015

Yaya Kerim (born 10 August 1991) is a Chadian football striker and the member of Chad national football team. As of 2024, he plays for Renaissance in the Chad Premier League.

== Career ==
Kerim started his football career in Gazelle. In 2010, he joined Renaissance FC. He helped his team win the Chad Cup and Super Cup, scoring the goal in both finals. In 2011, he was called on a trial by Spanish segunda division club Real Valladolid. He joined USM El Harrach in 2012. As of 2022, he plays for Renaissance in the Chad Premier League.

=== International career ===
Kerim has 7 caps for national team, and he was a part of qualifying campaign for 2012 African Cup of Nations. He debuted in home match against Togo which ended 2–2, in July 2010. For the national team, he usually plays left wing, or left back.

== See also ==
- List of Chad international footballers
