= Elect Sport d'Abéché =

Chadian football club

- Full name: Elect Sport d'Abéché Football Club
- Manager: Djuin Yann
- League: Chad Premier League
- 2013: unknown

Elect Sport FC is a football (soccer) club from Chad based in Ouaddai. They have competed several times in the Chadian Championnat National; firstly in 2008 having qualified from the Ouaddai regional league. Their most recent appearance was in 2013, qualifying after winning the Zone 2 du Nord-Est championship playoff, beating Bafana Bafana de Biltine in the final match.
