= Geyser FC =

Chadian football club

Geyser
- Full name: Geyser FC
- Ground: Stade Omnisports Idriss Mahamat Ouya; N'Djamena, Chad
- Capacity: 20.000
- Manager: ?
- League: Chad Premier League
Away colours

Geyser FC is a football (soccer) club from Chad based in N'Djamena.

In 2011 the team has played in Chad Premier League.

== Stadium ==
The club plays home matches on Stade Omnisports Idriss Mahamat Ouya.

== Kits ==
The team plays in blue and orange kits.

== League participations ==
- Chad Premier League : 2011–2013
- Chad Second Division : 2013–
