= Misdongarde Betolngar =

Chadian footballer (born 1985)

Personal information
- Full name: Misdongarde Betolngar
- Date of birth: 26 November 1985 (age 40)
- Place of birth: N'Djamena, Chad
- Height: 1.90 m (6 ft 3 in)
- Position: Striker

Senior career*
Years	Team	Apps	(Gls)
2003–2006	Renaissance	52	(18)
2007	Union Douala	40	(22)
2007–2008	Red Star Belgrade	15	(4)
2008–2009	Budućnost Podgorica	12	(3)
2009–2012	Metalac Gornji Milanovac	77	(16)
2012–2013	Mladost Lučani	30	(5)
2014	Borac Čačak	1	(0)
2014	Sloga Kraljevo	11	(1)
2015	Renaissance		

International career
2005–2012	Chad	24	(4)
- * Club domestic league appearances and goals

Misdongarde Betolngar (born 26 November 1985) is a Chadian retired footballer. His last club was Renaissance. He played for Chad national team. His given name is sometimes spelled Misdongard and his surname Betoligar or Betonligar. In 2011, Betolngar was the highest paid athlete from Chad, making an annual salary of $21,500 (USD) with FK Metalac Gornji Milanovac.

== Club career ==
Betolngar began his career in Chad by Renaissance FC in his hometown N'Djamena where he became the league's top scorer in 2005. He then played for Union Douala and was the top scorer of the Cameroon Première Division during the season 2007. He first came on trial, but satisfied the club and signed by Red Star Belgrade after signing from Cameroonian club Union Douala for 120,000 euros. Misdongarde played his first game against Olympiacos F.C. and he scored his first goal in a competitive match after five appearances. Betolngar wasn't eligible to play in European matches that season. In December 2008, he left Red Star and moved to FK Budućnost Podgorica.

=== Metalac Gornji Milanovac ===
After only a half year in Podgorica he signed with FK Metalac Gornji Milanovac. In season 2009/10 he was part of the club's lineup 27 times. He was 25 times in the starting team, got substituted in 2 times, and scored 7 goals. In season 2010/11 he played 28 matches and scored 6 goals. In season 2011/12 Misdongard was part of the club's lineup 22 times. He was 12 times in the starting team, got substituted in 10 times, scoring 3 goals in league and 1 in national cup.

=== Mladost Lučani ===
In the summer of 2012 he moved to FK Mladost Lučani.

=== Return to Chad ===
After short spells with Serbian second level sides FK Borac Čačak and Sloga Kraljevo, Betolngar returned to Chad and joined his former club Renaissance in 2015, where he finished his career after playing the whole 2015 season, being the team's captain.

== International career ==
Betolngar was a member of Chad national football team and has played over 20 games during his international career.

He was part of the squad that won the 3rd place at the 2007 CEMAC Cup. He played in 2010 World Cup qualifiers, playing 3 matches and scoring 1 goal. After 4 years of absence, he played a match for Chad again, against Malawi, on 16 June 2012, which was his last match for a national team.

== Personal life ==
Betolngar converted to Serbian Orthodoxy in 2014 and acquired the name Đorđe.

== Honours ==
Renaissance

- Chad Premier League: 2004, 2005, 2006

Individual

- Chad Premier League top scorer: 2005
- Cameroon Première Division top scorer (1): 2007

== See also ==
- List of Chad international footballers
