= Geezer =

Geezer may refer to:

- Geezer Butler, the founding bassist for Black Sabbath
- GZR, one of three different names used by Geezer Butler's heavy metal band
- Kieran McGeeney, manager of the Armagh senior football team
- Geezer (comic strip), a character in the British comic The Beezer
- 3 Geezers!, a 2013 film
- Geezer (film), an American comedy-drama film
- Guizer, a performer in a traditional event such as Up Helly Aa or a Mummers Play.
- Geezer (group), an American musical duo consisting of Kevin Abstract and Dominic Fike

== See also ==
- Guizer
- Geyser
- Wide boy
- Geyser (disambiguation)
