= Sitamadji Allarassem =

Chadian footballer (1988–2014)

Personal information
- Date of birth: 24 December 1988
- Place of birth: N'Djamena, Chad
- Date of death: 4 December 2014 (aged 25)
- Place of death: Sarh, Chad
- Position: Right back

Youth career
- 2001–2003: Garde Républicaine
- 2004–2008: Tourbillon

Senior career*
Years	Team	Apps	(Gls)
2009–2014	Tourbillon	80+	(0+)
Total		80+	(0+)

International career
2006–2010	Chad	18	(0)
- * Club domestic league appearances and goals

Sitamadji Allarassem (24 December 1988 – 4 December 2014) was a Chadian international footballer who played as a defender. He spent his entire senior career at Tourbillon FC and was also a member of the Chad national team. He earned 18 caps and was a part of the qualifying campaign for the 2010 FIFA World Cup and 2012 Africa Cup of Nations.
