= Geyser (fireboat, 1889) =

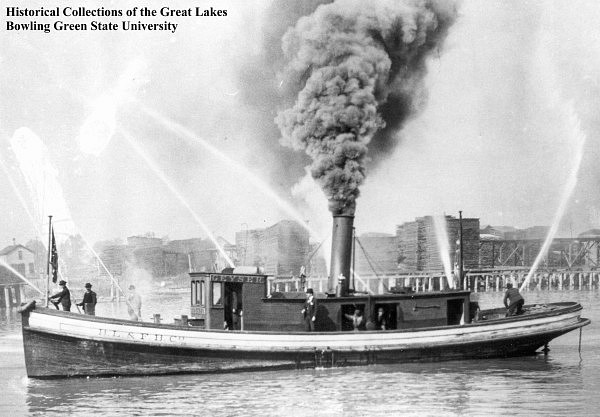
Steam powered fireboat Geyser, of Bay City, Michigan, in 1890.

The Geyser was a steam powered fireboat built for Bay City, Michigan. At the time she was being built, in 1889, it was anticipated that she would be twice as powerful as any other vessel on the Saginaw River.

Specifications
gross tonnage	29 tons
net tonnage	14 tons
builder	James Davidson
length	56 feet (17 m)
beam	16 feet (4.9 m)
draft	7 feet (2.1 m)
