= Modou Kouta =

Chadian football manager

Personal information
- Full name: Oumar Yaya Mahamat
- Place of birth: Chad
- Position: Midfielder

Managerial career
- Years: Team
- Gazelle FC
- 2010–2011: Sony Ela Nguema
- 2011–2013: Chad
- 2015–2016: Chad

Oumar Yaya Mahamat, known as Modou Kouta is a Chadian former international football player and football manager. From September 2011 to December 2013 he coached Chad national football team.

Mahamat, returned as coach of Chad in 2015, taking control of matches against Egypt in November 2015.
