= Majdi Mosrati =

Tunisian footballer

Personal information
- Date of birth: 13 September 1986 (age 40)
- Place of birth: Menzel Ennour, Tunisia
- Height: 1.82 m (6 ft 0 in)
- Position: Midfielder

Senior career*
Years	Team	Apps	(Gls)
2007–2008	US Monastir		
2008–2010	Étoile du Sahel		
2010–2012	Stade Tunisien		
2012–2014	CA Bordj Bou Arreridj		
2014–2015	ES Zarzis		
2017	Stade Tunisien		
2017–2019	US Monastir	27	(2)

International career
2008	Tunisia	2	(0)
- * Club domestic league appearances and goals

Majdi Mosrati (born 13 September 1986) is a retired Tunisian football midfielder.
