= AS DGSSIE =

Chadian football club

- Full name: Association Sportive de la DGSSIE
- Founded: 2001 by CB Hamad Nime
- Ground: Stade Omnisports Idriss Mahamat Ouya; N'Djamena, Chad
- Capacity: 20,000
- League: Chad Premier League
- 2011: 4°
Home colours	Away colours

Association Sportive de la DGSSIE is a football (soccer) club from Chad based in N'Djamena. DGSSIE refers to Direction Générale des Services de Sécurité et des Institutions de l'Etat.

The club was founded in 2001.
