= Lounés Bendahmane =

Algerian footballer (born 1977)

Personal information
- Full name: Lounés Bendahmane
- Date of birth: 3 April 1977 (age 49)
- Place of birth: Baghlia, Algeria
- Height: 1.80 m (5 ft 11 in)
- Position: Midfielder

Senior career*
Years	Team	Apps	(Gls)
1997–2000	JS Bordj Ménaïel		
2000–2006	JS Kabylie	126	(14)
2006	USM Annaba	10	(0)
2006–2007	MC Alger	9	(1)
2007	OMR El Annasser	15	(3)
2007–2008	RC Kouba		
2008-2010	CR Belouizdad	25	(2)
2010-2011	MC Saida		
2011-2014	CABB Arreridj		
2014-2015	O Médéa		

International career^{‡}
2001–2003	Algeria	5	(0)
- * Club domestic league appearances and goals ‡ National team caps and goals as of November 26, 2009

Lounés Bendahmane (born 3 April 1977) is an Algerian former footballer who last played for O Médéa in Algeria. He has been retired since 1 July 2015.

== National team statistics ==
Algeria national team
Year	Apps	Goals
2001	2	0
2002	2	0
2003	1	0
Total	5	0

== Honours ==
- Won the CAF Cup three times with JS Kabylie in 2000, 2001 and 2002
- Won the Algerian League once with JS Kabylie in 2004
- Participated in the 2002 African Cup of Nations in Mali
- Has 5 caps for the Algerian National Team
