= 20 August 1955 Stadium (Bordj Bou Arréridj) =

Sports venue in Algeria

Coordinates: 36.0667°N 4.7667°E

20 August Stadium
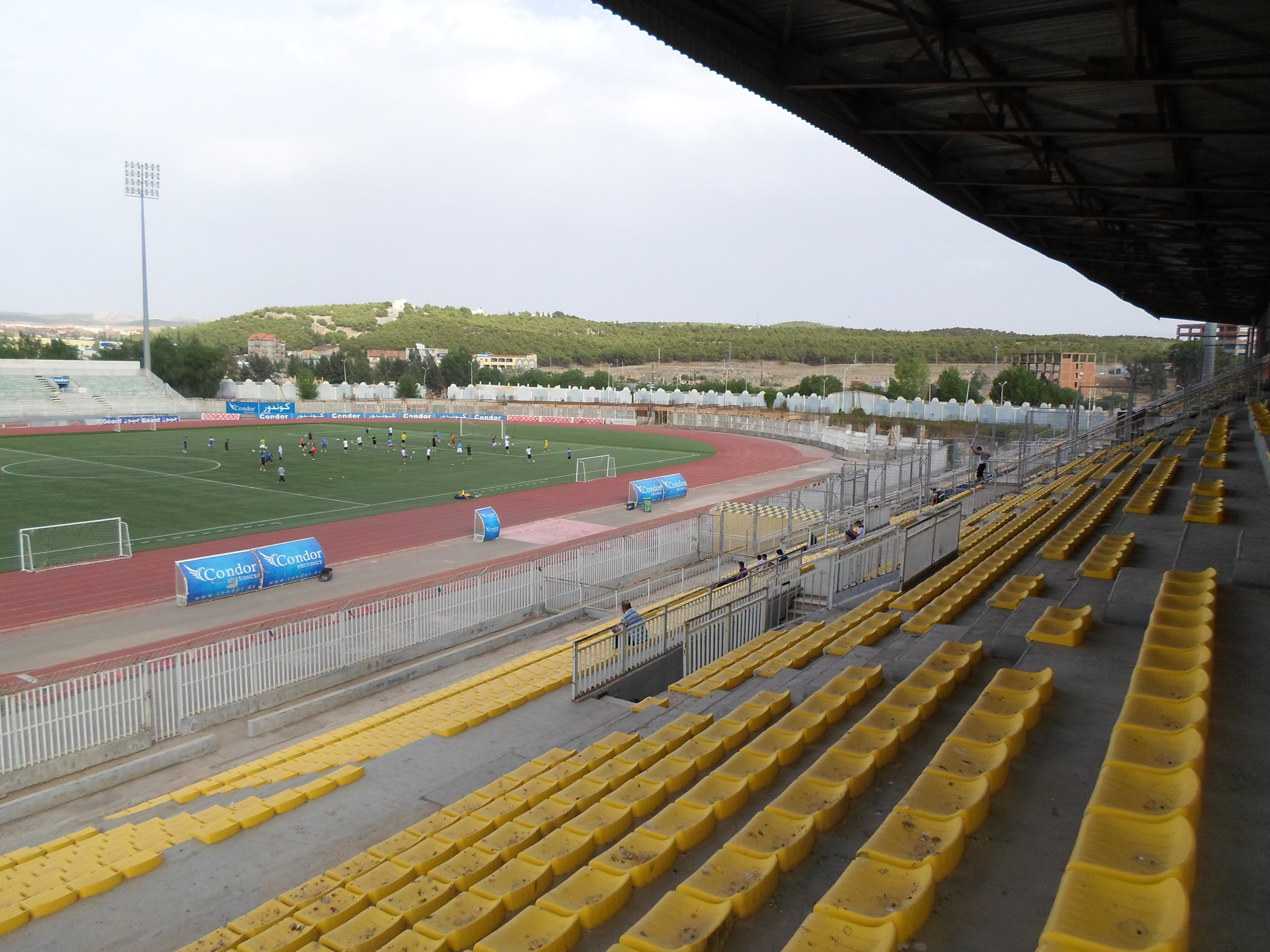
- Interactive map of 20 August Stadium
- Full name: 20 August 1955 Stadium
- Location: Bordj Bou Arréridj, Algeria
- Capacity: 15,000
- Surface: Artificial grass

Construction
- Opened: 20 July 1997

Tenant
- CA Bordj Bou Arréridj

The 20 August 1955 Stadium (Arabic: ملعب 20 أوت 1955, French: Stade du 20 Août 1955) is a multi-purpose stadium located in Bordj Bou Arréridj, Algeria. It is currently used mostly for football matches and is the home ground of Bordj Bou Arréridj. The stadium holds 15,000 people.
