= Francis Oumar Belonga =

Chadian footballer (born 1978)

Francis Belonga
Personal information
- Full name: Francis Oumar Belonga
- Date of birth: 13 March 1978 (age 48)
- Place of birth: N'Djamena, Chad
- Height: 1.87 m (6 ft 2 in)
- Position: Striker

Team information
- Current team: Elect-Sport (Head coach)

Youth career
- 1997–1998: Esperance De Walia

Senior career*
Years	Team	Apps	(Gls)
1998–2002	Esperance De Walia	55	(15)
2002–2004	Canon Yaoundé	37	(5)
2004–2005	Delta Téléstar	16	(4)
2005–2006	Atlético Petróleos Luanda	25	(11)
2006–2008	Bontang PKT	67	(24)
2008–?	Renaissance FC	60	(12)

International career
1998–2007	Chad	12	(3)
- * Club domestic league appearances and goals

Francis Oumar Belonga (born 13 March 1978) is a retired Chadian footballer who is currently a coach of Elect-Sport FC.

== Career ==
He has also played as striker for Bontang PKT in the Indonesia Super League. In his career, he scored 3 goals in his 8 played games.

== International career ==
Oumar made his national team debut on October 4, 1999, in a loss to Gabon (1-0) during the UNIFFAC Cup; he also took part in the biggest victory in Chad's history, a 5-0 win over São Tomé and Príncipe in the same tournament. His three international goals came during the first leg of the 2006 World Cup qualifying preliminary round against Angola, match Chad won 3-1; however, Chad was ultimately eliminated on away goals after losing the return leg (2-0) in Luanda. Alongside eight other players, he is the national team's tenth-highest scorer.

International goals

List of international goals scored by Francis Oumar
Number.	Date	Venue	Opponent	Score	Result	Competition
1	12 Octouber 2003	Stade Omnisports Idriss Mahamat Ouya, N'Djamena, Chad	Angola	1-0	3-1	2006 FIFA World Cup qualification
2	12 Octouber 2003	Stade Omnisports Idriss Mahamat Ouya, N'Djamena, Chad	Angola	2-1	3-1	2006 FIFA World Cup qualification
3	12 Octouber 2003	Stade Omnisports Idriss Mahamat Ouya, N'Djamena, Chad	Angola	3-1	3-1	2006 FIFA World Cup qualification

== See also ==
- List of Chad international footballers
