= Chadian Football Federation =

Governing body of association football in Tchadienne

CAF
- Founded: 1962
- FIFA affiliation: 1964
- CAF affiliation: 1964
- President: Moctar Mahamoud Hamid
- Website: ftfa.td

The Chadian Football Federation (Arabic: الاتحاد التشادي لكرة القدم, French: Fédération Tchadienne de Football Association; FTFA) is the governing body of football in Chad. It was founded in 1962, and affiliated to FIFA and to CAF in 1964. It organizes the national football leagues, including the Chad Premier League, Chad Cup and the national team. Its offices are located in N'Djamena. The FTFA is an apolitical, non-profit and non-denominational association. It has legal personality and financial autonomy. Its current president is Moctar Mahamoud Hamid.

== History ==
La Fédération Tchadienne de Football Association (FTFA) was established by Order No. 27/INT of July 28, 1962 and the legislation in force in the Republic of Chad. It is registered under folio No. 6 Case 44 of the Ministry of the Interior on 23 March 23, 1963 in N'Djamena. On December 11, 2016 FTFA Elective General Assembly was held, and Moctar Mahamoud Hamid was re-elected for a new four-year term. The votes cast were 114 votes out of 115. In November 2021, the football federations of Guinea and Chad become under FIFA supervision until 2022.

== Crest ==
Old logo

Present logo

== Structure ==
The bodies of the FTFA are the General Assembly (legislative and deliberative body), the Executive Committee (executive body), the standing and ad hoc committees, the General Secretariat (administrative body), the Audit Body, (Disciplinary and Appeals Committees) and the Electoral Bodies (Electoral Commission and Appeals Board for Elections).

The Executive Committee is composed of 20 members and is structured as follows:

A president;
A First Vice-President;
A 2nd Vice-President;
Seventeen (17) members

The General Secretariat performs all the administrative tasks of the FTFA under the direction of the Secretary General. Members of the General Secretariat are required to comply with the FTFA By-Laws and fulfill the tasks outlined in the best way possible.

== Competitions ==
It organizes the following competitions:

Men's football

- Championnat National (or LINAFOOT); First league
- Division 2; Second league
- Chad Cup
- Coupe de Ligue de N'Djaména

Youth football

Women's football

== Presidents ==
- 2008-2012 - Adoum Younousmi
- 2012-2016 - Moctar Mahamoud Hamid
- 2016 - Moctar Mahamoud Hamid
