= Postel 2000 FC =

Chadian football club

- Full name: Postel 2000 FC
- Founded: 1985
- Ground: Stade Omnisports Idriss Mahamat Ouya; N'Djamena, Chad
- Capacity: 20,000
- Chairman: Moussa Abakar
- Manager: Abdoulaye Mirzani
- League: Chad Premier League
- 2011: 8°
Home colours

Postel 2000 FC is a football (soccer) club from Chad based in N'Djamena. The club was national ligue champion 2 times, in 1993 and 1995.

== Achievements ==
- Chad Premier League : 2

1993, 1995.

- Chad Cup: 1

1991.

- Coupe de Ligue de N'Djaména: 0

Runners-up: 2009.

- Chad Super Cup: 0

== Performance in CAF competitions ==
- African Cup of Champions Clubs: 2 appearances

1994 – Preliminary Round
1996 – First Round

- CAF Cup Winners' Cup: 1 appearance

1992 – Preliminary Round

== Managers ==
- (Chad) Emmanuel Boukar
