= Chad Cup =

Football tournament in Chad

Chad Cup Coupe de Tchad
- Founded: 1973; 53 years ago
- Region: Chad
- Current champions: Elect-Sport (1st title)
- Most championships: Renaissance FC N'Djamena (8 titles)
- Broadcaster: Chadian TV

The Chad Cup is the top knockout tournament of the Chad football. The winner competes in the CAF Confederation Cup the following season.

== History ==
The first competition began in 1973. The first part of the cup was delayed due to the Chadian Civil War that took place. The later part up to 1988 and from 2002 to 2003 were no held due to financial problems.

Its first club into the continental competition was around the 1990s.

From 2009 to 2012, Coupe de Ligue de N'Djaména was considered the national cup. The winner of that competition enters the CAF Confederation Cup.

== Winners ==
- 1973 : Gazelle FC (N'Djaména)
- 1974 : Gazelle FC (N'Djaména)
- 1975–88: Unknown
- 1989 : Tourbillon FC (N'Djaména)
- 1990 : Renaissance FC (N'Djaména)
- 1991 : Postel 2000 FC (N'Djaména) 1–0 AS CotonTchad (N'Djaména)
- 1992 : Massinya (Massénya) 2-0 Boussa
- 1993 : Renaissance (Abéché) 3–2 Elect-Sport FC
- 1994 : Renaissance FC
- 1995 : AS CotonTchad (N'Djaména)
- 1996 : Renaissance FC (N'Djaména)
- 1997 : Gazelle FC (N'Djamena)
- 1998–99 : AS CotonTchad (N'Djaména)
- 1999–00 : Gazelle FC (N'Djaména)
- 2001 : Gazelle FC (N'Djaména)
- 2002 : Not played
- 2003 : Not played
- 2004 : Renaissance FC (N'Djaména) bt Espérance FC
- 2005 : Renaissance FC (N'Djaména) bt Lion Blessé FC
- 2006 : Renaissance FC (N'Djaména)
- 2007 : Renaissance FC (N'Djaména)
- 2008 : Tourbillon FC 4–1 Renaissance FC
- 2009 : AS CotonTchad (N'Djaména) 3-0 ASBNF (Koumra)
- 2010 : Tourbillon FC
- 2011 : Foullah Edifice FC (N'Djamena)
- 2012 : Gazelle FC (N'Djaména)
- 2013 : Aslad Moundou 1–1 Renaissance FC (N'Djaména) (3–1 pen)
- 2014–22: Not played
- 2023 : Elect-Sport 1–0 Renaissance

== Coupe de Ligue de N'Djaména ==
- 2009 : AS CotonTchad 4–3 (pen) Postel 2000 FC
- 2010 : Foullah Edifice 2–1 (aet) Renaissance FC
- 2011 : Renaissance FC 2–1 (aet) Foullah Edifice
- 2012 : Elect-Sport FC 1–1 (4–3 pen.) Renaissance FC
- 2013 : Renaissance FC 1–0 Foullah Edifice
- 2014 : Elect-Sport FC (Final between Elect-Sport FC and Renaissance FC)
