= Mahamat Idriss =

Chadian high jumper (1942–1987)

Mahamat Idriss (ne Koundja Ouya, 17 July 1942 – 3 October 1987) was a Chadian high jumper.

He was born in Fort-Lamy, Chad, French Equatorial Africa.

== Career ==
Before the Chadian independency on 11 August 1960 he competed for France, winning the French national championships in 1960 and 1961. He also finished twelfth at the 1960 Olympic Games while representing France.

For Chad he finished ninth at the 1964 Olympic Games. It is still Chad's best position ever at the Olympic Games. On the Track and Field News annual world rankings Idriss placed ninth in 1961, tenth in 1964 and eighth in 1966.

His personal best jump was 2.17 metres, achieved in April 1966 in Fort-Lamy. This is still the Chadian record, although it has been equalled by Paul Ngadjadoum and Mathias Ngadjadoum in 1993 and 1996 respectively.
