= Tourbillon FC =

Chadian football club

- Full name: Tourbillon FC
- Founded: 1972
- Ground: Stade Omnisports Idriss Mahamat Ouya; N'Djamena, Chad
- Capacity: 20,000
- Chairman: Mohammad Reza Laghaei ( DJ Tourbillon )
- Manager: Oumar Mbaidou
- League: Chad Premier League
- 2025–26: 14th
Home colours	Away colours

Tourbillon FC is a football (soccer) club from Chad based in N'Djamena. The club has won Chad Premier League title 6 times, they play their home matches at Stade Omnisports Idriss Mahamat Ouya.

The club is owned by Iranian entrepreneur Mohammad Reza Laghaei (DJ Tourbillon), who is also a former footballer.

== History ==
Tourbillon FC was created in 1970. The club has won 6 national league titles - in 1987, 1991, 1997, 2000, 2001 and 2010. In 2010, Tourbillon claimed the league title on the final day of the season with a 3–1 win over Elect-Sport, finishing on 38 points. In 2014, Tourbillon FC was relegated to the lower division before recovering in 2015-2016, with the title of champion of its division.

== Sponsors ==
The club's sponsor in 2010 was Compagnie Sucrière du Tchad (CST; Chadian Sugar Company).

== Finances ==
Recently Tourbillon FC faced big financial problems after they were left out of sponsors.

== Management ==
On November 1, 2019 an elective general meeting of the club was held. Mohammad Reza Laghaei was renewed at the head of the club for a mandate of 4 years (renewable) and was accompanied by 4 vice presidents. He was reappointed to the presidency of the club. Mohammad Reza Laghaei has already run the club for six years.

Position	Name
Chairman	Mohammad Reza Laghaei
Vice-chairmen	Abakar Abdelkerim Adre; Malloum Mahamat; Kostoingue Boguyana; Amssiane Lamana
General secretary	Hissen Kitagoto
General secretary deputies	Djounfoun Golbasia Félix; Mahamat Ousmane
General treasurer	Ahmat Djzouli
General treasurer deputies	Adoum Hamdo de Gaulle; Aldom Symplice
The advisers	Sanda Yerima; Mahamat Abakar Dede; Abakar Mahamat Saleh; Naime Dallou; Mangue Ouda; Djamal Moussa Atim; Mbaigeudim Naldoum Osé; Nichaba Maman; Lalem Sandra; Djimet Issa

== Achievements ==
- Chad Premier League : 5

1987, 1991, 1997, 2000, 2001, 2010.

- Chad Cup: 3

1987, 1989, 2008.

- Coupe de Ligue de N'Djaména: 0
- Chad Super Cup: 1

2008.

== Performance in CAF competitions ==
- CAF Champions League: 5 appearances

1998 – First Round
2001 – Preliminary round
2002 – First Round
2008 – disqualified in preliminary round
2011 – withdrew in preliminary round

- African Cup of Champions Clubs: 1 appearance

1992 – First Round

- CAF Confederation Cup: 2 appearances

2006 – Preliminary round
2009 – First Round

- CAF Cup: 1 appearance

1993 – First Round

- CAF Cup Winners' Cup: 1 appearance

1990 – First Round

== Managers ==
- Mamadou Bodjim (2006)
- Julien Toukam (2007–2008)
- Djibrine Dembele (2009)
- Mahamat Adoum (2010, 2011)
- Nambatingue Toko (2011–Present)

== Notable former players ==
- Japhet N'Doram
- Ezechiel Ndouassel
- Armel Koulara
- Sitamadji Allarassem
- Armand Djerabe
- Leger Djimrangar
- Hilaire Kedigui
- Karl Max Barthelemy
- Ndakom Valerie Ndeidoum
- Ahmed Evariste Medego
