= Elect-Sport FC =

Chadian football club

- Full name: Tout Puissant Elect-Sport de la Société Nationale de l'électricité FC
- Nickname(s): Les Electriciens (The Electricians)
- Founded: 1964; 61 years ago
- Ground: Stade Omnisports Idriss Mahamat Ouya
- Capacity: 20,000
- Chairman: Mahamat Saleh Issa
- Manager: Tokomon Madjiadoum
- League: Chad Premier League
- 2022: Chad Premier League, 1st (champions)
Home colours	Away colours

Elect-Sport FC (Arabic: اليكت سبور) is a football (soccer) club from Chad based in N'Djamena. It plays its home matches on Stade Omnisports Idriss Mahamat Ouya in N'Djamena.

The club's colours are traditionally yellow and black.

== History ==
The club has won national championship 7 times; in 1988, 1990, 1992, 2008, 2018, 2019 and 2022. The club has also won Coupe de Ligue de N'Djaména 2 times, in 2012 and 2014. In 2015 the club was among the entrants to preliminary round of CAF Confederation Cup where they played against Libyan Al-Ittihad Tripoli. In the first match in Libya, Al-Ittihad won 6–1. In the return leg in N'Djamena Al-Ittihad won 1–0 and ruled out Elect from the competition.

== Stadium ==
Stade Omnisports Idriss Mahamat Ouya, also named Stade Nacional, is a multi-purpose stadium located in N'Djamena, Chad. It is currently used mostly for football matches. The stadium holds 20,000 people. It is currently the home ground of the Chad national football team. It is named after former Chadian highjumper Mahamat Idriss (1942–1987).

== Achievements ==
- Chad Premier League : 7

1988, 1990, 1992, 2008, 2018, 2019, 2022

- Chad Cup: 1

2023
Runners-up: 1993.

- Coupe de Ligue de N'Djaména: 2

2012, 2014

- Chad Super Cup: 0

Runners-up: 2008.

== Performance in CAF competitions ==
- CAF Champions League: 3 appearances

2009 – preliminary round
2018 – preliminary round
2020 – first round

- African Cup of Champions Clubs: 2 appearances

1991 – first round
1993 – preliminary round

- CAF Confederation Cup: 3 appearances

2013 – preliminary round
2015 – preliminary round
2020 – play-off round

- CAF Cup: 1 appearance

1994 – withdrew in First Round

== Managers ==
- 2010–2011 – Mahamat Abakar
- 2012 – Amane Tounia
- 2013 – Maslengar Djikoloum
- 2014–2015 – Toukam Julien
- 2016 – Amane Adoum
- 2018–2020 – Francis Oumar Belonga
- 2022 – Toukam Julien
- 2022–present – Tokomon Madjiadoum
