= Gazelle FC =

Football club from Chad

- Full name: Gazelle Football Club
- Founded: 16 May 1972; 54 years ago
- Ground: Stade Omnisports Idriss Mahamat Ouya; N'Djamena, Chad
- Capacity: 20,000
- Chairman: Adoum Younousmi
- Manager: Yaya Mahamat Abdelgani
- League: Chad Premier League
- 2025–26: 7th
- Website: http://oumarkoul.e-monsite.com
Home colours	Away colours

Gazelle FC is a football club from Chad based in N'Djamena. The club currently plays in the Chad Premier League, the top flight of Chadian football.

Gazelle FC was founded on May 16, 1972, in the capital city of N'Djamena. The club has won four national titles and six national cup titles.

The club's colors are traditionally black and white.

== History ==
Founded in 1972, the club played in Chadian second ligue from 1972 to 1973. In 1973–1974 season, the team secured promotion to the First Division. On May 8, 2007, the club has signed their first sponsorship deal ever, with Sogea Satom. On August 29, 2007, Gazelle has signed their second sponsorship deal, with Ecobank Tchad. Gazelle have won 3 league titles (in 2009, 2012 and 2015), 6 national cups, 6 league-cups and 2 super-cups. They were league runners-up 7 times: in 1975, 1976, 1977, 1982, 1984, 2003 and 2010. The club has also represented Chad in African competitions in 1994, 1998, 2000, 2002, 2005, 2010 and 2013.

Their first appearance at the African cup competition was in 1994 where they lost to Sony Elá Nguema of Equatorial Guinea, not a single goal Gazelle had scored. The remaining three had Gazelle qualifying as cup winner, Gazelle scored their first continental goal in 1998 in a match against Dragons Ouémé, they never defeated that club in its two matches, one had a draw. Gazelle came back in 2001 and faced Sporting Praia of Cape Verde, there, they made their first victory over that club 5-2in 2001, they elevated into the First Round after Sporting Praia withdrew and faced Democratic Congo's AS Saint-Luc and didn't won a match, the club scored two goals. Gazelle appeared for the fourth time in 2002 and defeated Akokana 3–0 in the second match as the first one was scoreless, Gazelle challenged USM Alger from Algeria, the first match was a scoreless draw and lost the second one 1–5. Their next appearance at the cup competition would be the CAF Confederation Cup and faced FC 105 from Gabon, the club lost two matches Gazelle only scored a goal there.

After winning their first championship title in 2009, Gazelle entered the continental championships for the first time in 2010, the club defeated the first match against Bayelsa which was Gazelle's last win, the second one had a two-goal draws and Gazelle advanced into the First Round where they challenged against Al Merreikh of the Sudan (now commonly as the Khartoumian Sudan), the club did not won a match and scored 2 goals to three in two of its matches, one had a goal draw and Gazelle was out, Gazelle scored its final goals to date. In their second CAF Champions League appearance and their recent continental competition, the club lost to Egypt's Zamalek in nearly large number of 7 in the first match and Gazelle scored no goal in either to its two matches, the second match was scoreless and was knocked out of the CAF Champions League competition.

Gazelle did not appear in the 2016 CAF Champions League, the Chadian Football Federation after their championship win decided to inscribe Ascot and Renaissance into the African club competition following a controversy over a Gazelle player with contracts with two clubs.

== Stadium ==
Stade Omnisports Idriss Mahamat Ouya, also named Stade Nacional, is a multi-purpose stadium located in N'Djamena, Chad. It is currently used mostly for football matches. The stadium holds 20,000 people. It is currently the home ground of the Chad national football team. It is named after former Chadian highjumper Mahamat Idriss (1942–1987).

== Uniform ==
The uniform for home games is a white shirt with black shorts and socks and the uniform for away games is an orange T-shirt and socks with a black shorts. The uniform's in 2010 were a dark blue T-shirt and socks with yellow shorts for home games and white clothing for away games.

Home uniform in 2000's	Home uniform in 2010	Away uniform in 2010

== Honours ==
- Chad Premier League: 4

2009, 2012, 2015, 2020

- Chad Cup: 6

1973, 1974, 1997, 2000, 2001, 2012.

- Chad League Cup: 6
- Chad Super Cup: 2

=== Secondary Achievements ===
- 1 Banque BTCD Cup title
- 1 STEE Cup title

== Performance in CAF competitions ==
Gazelle's results in CAF competition
Season	Competition	Qualification method	Round	Opposition	Home	Away	Aggregate
1993	CAF Cup Winners' Cup		Preliminary Round	(Equatorial Guinea) CD Elá Nguema	1-1	2-1	2-3
1998	CAF Cup Winners' Cup	Chad Cup winners	Preliminary Round	(Benin) Dragons FC de l'Ouémé	2-2	0-1	3-2
2001	CAF Cup Winners' Cup	Chad Cup winners	Preliminary Round	(Cape Verde) Sporting Clube da Praia	5-2	canc. (Note: Sporting Praia Withdrew)	5-2
2001	CAF Cup Winners' Cup	Chad Cup winners	First round	(Democratic Republic of the Congo) AS Saint-Luc	0-1	2-2	2-3
2002	CAF Cup Winners' Cup	Chad Cup winners	Preliminary Round	(Niger) Akokana FC	0-0	3-0	3-0
2002	CAF Cup Winners' Cup	Chad Cup winners	First round	(Algeria) USM Alger	0-0	1-6	1-6
2005	CAF Confederation Cup	Chad Cup winners	Preliminary Round	(Gabon) FC 105 Libreville	3-1	0-2	3-3 (a)
2010	CAF Champions League	Chadian champions	Preliminary Round	(Nigeria) Bayelsa United	1–0	2–2	3–2
2010	CAF Champions League	Chadian champions	First round	Al Merreikh	1–1	1–2	2–3
2013	CAF Champions League	Chadian League champions	Preliminary Round	(Egypt) Zamalek	7–0	0–0	7–0

== Positions ==
- 2009: 1st
- 2010: 2nd
- 2011: 5th
- 2012: 1st
- 2013: Semi-finals (N'Djamena League Cup)
- 2014-15: 1st
- 2016: 1st (11 points)
- 2017: championship interrupted
- 2018: championship abandoned
- 2019: 4th in Group B
- 2020: 1st

== Statistics ==
- Best position: First Round (CAF Champions League)
- Best position at cup competitions: First Round (continental)
- Appearances at the League Cup: 9
- Total matches played at the CAF Champions League: 6
  - Total matches played at home: 3
  - Total matches played away: 3
- Total number of wins at the CAF Champions League: 1
- Total draws at the CAF Champions League: 3
  - Total home draws: 1
  - Total away draws: 2
- Total losses at the CAF Champions League: 2
- Total number of goals scored at the CAF Champions League: 5
- Total matches played at the continental cup competitions 13
  - Total matches played at home: 7
  - Total matches played away: 6
- Total goals scored at the continental cup competitions: 13
  - CAF Cup Winners' Cup: 10
  - CAF Confederation Cup: 3

== Current squad ==
As of 14 June 2019

Note: Flags indicate national team as defined under FIFA eligibility rules; some limited exceptions apply. Players may hold more than one non-FIFA nationality.

No.	Pos.	Nation	Player
—	GK	CHA	Oumar Yangoussou (Captain)
—	GK	CHA	Mbairamadji Dillah
—	DF	CHA	Fignal N'Dibi Évariste
—	DF	CHA	Emmanuel N'Dadje
—	DF	WAL	Peter Moisan
—	DF	CHA	Abba Haroun
—	DF	CHA	Abbali
—	DF	CHA	Ndilbé
—	MF	CHA	Abdel Aziz Makine
—	MF	CHA	Frederick Abboh
—	MF	CHA	Emmanuel Banadji
—	MF	CHA	Loubandem Guiguiban Aime

No.	Pos.	Nation	Player
—	MF	CHA	Amadou Djimet
—	MF	CHA	Doug
—	MF	CHA	Lass
—	FW	CHA	Hassane Boudina
—	FW	CHA	Celestin Edouard Djembayel
—	FW	CHA	Djamal Mahamat Saleh
—	FW	CHA	Ahmat Hassan Mahamat
—	FW	CHA	Goudja
—		CHA	Abdelmounti
—		CHA	Nesdé
—		CHA	Souleyman
—		CHA	Djimtebaye Bemadjita

== Notable players ==
The club had few national team players like Hilaire Kédigui, Doumnan Herman, Cesar Madalangue and Mbairamadji Dillah.

== Chairmen history ==
- (Chad) Ageb Lamala (in 2013)
- (Chad) Ajib Koulamallah (2016)
- (Chad) Adoum Younousmi (2023)

== Managerial history ==
Name	Nationality	From	To
Sokolov	(Soviet Union)	1972	1973
Aleksander Klimatchov	(Soviet Union)	1973	1974
Haroune Sabah	Chad		
Modou Kouta	Chad		
Toukam Julien	Chad	2010	2012
Joseph Mounte	Cameroon	2012	2015
Mamadou Bodjim	Chad	2015	2016
Mahamat Allamine Abakar 'Boli'	Chad	2016	2018
Issa Moussa	Chad	2018	
Zam Gagso Barkos	Chad	2023	present
