= Stade Omnisports Idriss Mahamat Ouya =

Sports venue in N'Djamena, Chad

- Location within Chad
- Location: Avenue Bokasa; N'Djamena, Chad
- Coordinates: 12.1002°N 15.0544°E
- Capacity: 20,000

Construction
- Opened: 1973
- Renovated: 2010, 2022–2025

Tenants
- Tourbillon; CotonTchad; Gazelle; Renaissance N'Djamena; Postel 2000; Foullah Edifice; DGSSE

Stade National, also named Stade Omnisports Idriss Mahamat Ouya (Arabic: ملعب وطني), is a multi-use stadium in N'Djamena, Chad. It is currently used mostly for football matches. The stadium holds 20,000 people and it has artificial grass. It is currently the home ground of the Chad national football team. It is named after former Chadian highjumper Mahamat Idriss (1942–1987).

The stadium is located on Avenue Bezo, also known as Avenue Bokasa.

It is the home field of several clubs, including Gazelle, Renaissance N'Djamena, CotonTchad (or CotonTchad N'Djamena), Tourbilllon, Postel 2000, DGSSIE and Foullah Edifice.
