= Renaissance FC =

Association football club in Chad

- Full name: Renaissance Football Club
- Nickname(s): Mayaye
- Short name: RFC
- Founded: 1954; 71 years ago
- Ground: Stade Omnisports Idriss Mahamat Ouya; N'Djamena, Chad
- Capacity: 20,000
- Chairman: Aziz Mahamat Saleh
- Manager: Tchadé Yanga
- League: Chad Premier League
- 2020: 2nd
Home colours	Away colours	Third colours

Renaissance FC or RFC is a Chadian professional football club based in N'Djamena. The club won Chad Premier League 7 times, last time in 2007. Recently, it produced a few Chad national football team players, such as Mondésir Alladjim, Yaya Kerim, Esaie Djikoloum and Hassan Diallo.

The club's colours are traditionally green and red.

== History ==
RFC was created in 1954, a period still under colonial domination. Constituted on the basis of the French law of 1901, RFC is a purely associative club, falling under no corporation. The club was national champion 6 times, first time in 1989. In 2011, the club won national cup and supercup, after beating national champions Foullah Edifice in both finals.

== Stadium ==
Stade Omnisports Idriss Mahamat Ouya, also named Stade National, is a multi-purpose stadium located in N'Djamena, Chad. It is currently used mostly for football matches. The stadium holds 20,000 people. It is currently the home ground of the Chad national football team. It is named after former Chadian highjumper Mahamat Idriss (1942–1987).

== Rivalries ==
RFC's arch-rivals are Elect-Sport FC.

== Sponsors ==
The club was sponsored by CGCOC, a Chinese construction company.

== Achievements ==
- Chad Premier League: 7

1989, 2002, 2003, 2004, 2005, 2006, 2007.

- Chad Cup: 2

1990, 1996.

- Coupe de Ligue de N'Djaména: 2

2011, 2013.

- Chad Super Cup: 1

2011.

== Performance in CAF competitions ==
- CAF Champions League: 3 appearances

2005 – Preliminary Round
2006 – Preliminary Round
2007 – Preliminary Round

- African Cup of Champions Clubs: 1 appearance

1990 – Preliminary Round

- CAF Confederation Cup: 1 appearance

2012 – First Round

- CAF Cup Winners' Cup: 4 appearances

1991 – First Round
1994 – withdrew in First Round
1997 – First Round
1999 – First Round

== Current staff ==
As of 10 August 2015.

Name	Role
Mahamat Ngaroua	Chairman
Tchadé Yanga	Manager
Djamal Tchoukou	Sporting director

== List of coaches ==
- Idriss Mahamat Ouya
- (Chad) Mahamat Tounia
- Fromageon
- (Chad) Djimassal Kemobe
- Ousmane Tigabe
- (Chad) Mahamat N’Galbogui
- 1987-1988 Hamit Mahamat Dahalop
- 1997 – (Chad) Mahamat Oumar Yaya (alias Modou Kouta)
- 1998 – Douba Djorio & Moussa Alhadj
- 1999 – Kaguer Beakono
- 2002 – Djibrine Démbélé
- 2003 – Kaguer Beakono
- 2004 Moukhtar Njoya & (Chad) Modou Kouta
- 2005 – (Chad) Modou Kouta
- 2006–2007 – (Chad) Emmanuel Boukar
- 2007 – (Chad) Modou Kouta
- (Chad) Modou Kouta
- 2010 – (Chad) Denis Tokene
- 2011 – (Chad) Djimiang Mbailemdana
- 2012 – Yean Claude Yerima
- 2012 – (Chad) Modou Kouta
- 2015 (Chad) Francis Oumar Belonga
- 2016 (Chad) Ngartessen Ngarhokarial

== Presidents ==
- El Hadj Youssouf
- Abderamane Bechir (2010–)
- Moctar Mahamoud Hamid
- Mahamat Ngaroua
- Aziz Mahamat Saleh (2024-)
