= AS CotonTchad =

Chadian football club

- Full name: Association Sportive CotonTchad
- Nickname: ASCOT
- Ground: Stade Omnisports Idriss Mahamat Ouya; N'Djamena, Chad
- Capacity: 20,000
- Chairman: Bakari Mahamat Ngamou
- Manager: Kader Sougou
- League: Chad Premier League
- 2025–26: 11th
Home colours	Away colours

Association Sportive CotonTchad is a football club from Chad based in N'Djamena.

== History ==
ASCOT won national championship 2 times; in 1996 and 1998. The club also won national cup three times; in 1995, 1999 and 2009.

ASCOT represented Chad in CAF Confederation Cup 2 times; in 2007 and 2010. In 2008, ASCOT should have played Preliminary round of 2008 CAF Confederation Cup but was disqualified for failure to fulfill their financial obligations. In 2010, they were eliminated by Al Ahli (Tripoli) in Preliminary round.

== Stadium ==
Stade Omnisports Idriss Mahamat Ouya, also named Stade Nacional, is a multi-purpose stadium located in N'Djamena, Chad. It is currently used mostly for football matches. The stadium holds 20,000 people. It is currently the home ground of the Chad national football team. It is named after former Chadian highjumper Mahamat Idriss (1942–1987).

== Achievements ==
- Chad Premier League: 2

1996, 1998.

- Chad Cup: 3

1995, 1999, 2009.

- Coupe de Ligue de N'Djaména: 1

2009.

== Performance in CAF competitions ==
- CAF Champions League: 2 appearances

1997 – First Round
1999 – Preliminary round

- CAF Confederation Cup: 3 appearances

2007 – First Round
2008 – disqualified in preliminary round
2010 – Preliminary round

- CAF Cup: 2 appearances

1992 – First Round
1998 – Quarter-Finals

- CAF Cup Winners' Cup: 2 appearances

1996 – First Round
2000 – Preliminary round

== Managers ==
- Modou Kouta
- 2011 –? Oumar Francis
- 2016 - Modou Kouta
- 2018 - Mahamat Allamine 'Boli'

== Presidents ==
- 2012 - Adoum Faki
