= Chad Premier League =

Top-level football league in Chad

- Founded: 1961
- Country: Chad
- Confederation: CAF
- Number of clubs: 12 (since 2022)
- Level on pyramid: 1
- Domestic cup: Chad Cup
- League cup: Coupe de Ligue de N'Djaména
- International cup(s): Champions League; Confederation Cup
- Current champions: Aiglons (1st title) (2025-26)
- Most championships: Renaissance (10 titles
- Broadcaster(s): Télé Tchad
- Current: 2024 LINAFOOT (Chad)

Chad Premier League (French: Ligue Nationale de Football, also known as LINAFOOT) is a Chadian league for men's association football clubs. At the top of the Chadian football league system, it is the country's primary football competition. Contested by 12 clubs, it is organized under the play-off formula.

Unlike the 1st LINAFOOT edition (in 2015) organised as a full national championship and won by Gazelle FC, the last four editions were organized under the play-off formula.

Since the inception of the Chad Premier League in 1988, eight clubs have won the title: Renaissance (7), Elect-Sport (7), Tourbillon (5), Gazelle (4), Foullah Edifice (3), AS CotonTchad (2), Postel 2000 (2), Renaissance (Abéché) (2). The current champions are Elect-Sport, who won the title in 2022.

== History ==
Chadian football has always been followed by the financial difficulties, making it hard to organise the competitions. For years, the main resource was the aid of one million dollars every four years by the FIFA. This aid was completely being engulfed in the organization of national and regional competitions. The national championship was being played in two stages. The first stage was the regional championship with teams from the same prefecture. The second stage was national championship, a sort of tournament between the 14 champions of the 14 prefectures. The format of competition and a number of teams, however, was being changed from time to time. From season 2010 to 2014 the first division consisted of clubs from N'Djamena only. Championship is being played over a short time, usually within a week and held alongside the national cup. The leagues run over a whole year.

=== 2010-2014 ===
The season 2010 was the first one (out of five) to include the teams from N'Djamena only. The league was called Ligue de N'Djamena, too. The participating teams were: ASCOT, DGSSIE, Elect-sport, Foullah, Gazelle, Postel 2000, RFC, Toumai, Tourbillon and USM. Tourbillon FC were the champions with 38 points, 4 more than league runners-up Gazelle FC. The last placed team (USM) was relegated to D2, while the 9th team (Postel 2000) played relegation playoff. Postel 2000 played against D2 runner-up, Saccoger, and won 1–0, so both teams remained at previous level.

Season 2011 was the second one to include teams from N'Djamena only. The participating teams were: ASCOT, DGSSIE, Elect-sport, Foullah, Gazelle, Geyser, Postel 2000, RFC, Toumai and Tourbillon. Foullah Edifice were the champions with 43 points, 8 more than league runners-up Tourbillon. The last placed team (Geyser) was relegated to D2, while the 9th team (Toumai) played relegation playoff. Toumai stayed in the league, however they did not enter the 2012 season, so the next league edition had 9 teams only.

=== LINAFOOT ===
From season 2015, national league system went through many changes. LINAFOOT started operating the league. The new system of 12 clubs from all over the country was introduced as well. Clubs that played in the first division were: AS Lycod Doba, AS Mirim Mongo, AS Wadi Fira, ASCOT Moundou, AS CotonTchad, Elect-Sport FC, FC Kebbi, Foullah Edifice FC, Gazelle FC, Renaissance FC, Renaissance FC (Abéché), AS Kokaga. Gazelle FC won the championship. This edition of LINAFOOT was marked by many controversies, which led to proclaiming AS CotonTchad league champion, and then later giving Gazelle FC champion title back.

In season 2016 championship was interrupted after only 5 rounds, and no Chadian clubs represented the country in continental competitions.

Following financial difficulties and the lack of sponsors, FTFA decided to implement the new format of the national championship, which would lower the costs. In 2017 FIFA proposed to FTFA a new championship format, which FTFA accepted. The new formula of the national football championship took place in two phases. The first phase, called a zonal phase, consistsed of three zones. Zone 1 consisted of six clubs from N'Djamena (RFC, Gazelle, Tourbillon, Elect-Sport, Foullah Ediffice and Ascot), Zone 2 consisted of the clubs from Sarh, Koumra, Doba, Moundou, Pala and Bongor, Zone 3 included the clubs of Moussoro, Ati, Biltine, Mongo, Salamat and Abéché. At the end of the zonal confrontations, three clubs in Zone 2 and Zone 3 have joined the 4 qualifiers in Zone 1 for the second phase of the championship. The 5th and 6th of the final ranking should have been officially relegated to lower division.

The 2018 LINAFOOT was the 2nd season of the LINAFOOT. The season started on 15 September 2018 and concluded on 7 October 2018. The twelve teams were divided into two groups of six teams. The matches were played at three stadiums: Stade d'Académie de Farcha, Stade Omnisports Idriss Mahamat Ouya and Stade de Paris-Congo. All matches were being played at 03:30 p.m. local time. Elect-Sport FC won their fifth Chadian title. Abou Deco (AS CotonTchad) was the league topscorer with 14 goals; Mbangousoum Éric was voted the best player; Francis Oumar Belonga (Elect-Sport FC) was voted the best coach.

The 2019 LINAFOOT was the 3rd season of the LINAFOOT. Elect-Sport FC won their sixth Chadian title. Goyam César (Avenir Sarh) was the league topscorer with 10 goals; Brahim Ngaroudal was voted the best player; Adoum Deffallah (Elect-Sport FC) was voted best goalkeeper; Francis Oumar Belonga (Elect-Sport FC) was voted the best coach.

The 2020 LINAFOOT was the 4th season of the LINAFOOT. Delayed due to the Covid-19 pandemic, the season started on 27 September 2020 and concluded on 8 October 2020. Gazelle won their fourth Chadian title.

The 2022 LINAFOOT, was the 5th edition of the national football league. The tournament was held from July 3 to 17, 2022, and all matches were played in N'Djaména at the Stade de Diguel, Stade de Paris-Congo, and Stade Académie de Farcha. A total of 12 teams participated in the tournament, from seven zones as follows: Espoir FC de Guéra (Zone 1), AS Santé (Abéché) (Zone 2), Olympique de Mao (Mao) (Zone 3), Boule d'Or (Pala) and Expérience FC (Bongor) (Zone 4), Gazelle FC (Sarh) and FC Amboko (Goré) (Zone 5), AS Santé (Amdjarass) (Zone 6), and Foullah Edifice FC (N'Djaména), Tout Puissaint Elect-Sport FC (N'Djaména), AS PSI (N'Djaména), and Renaissance FC (N'Djaména) (Zone 7). The tournament consisted of a group stage and a final. The group stage was divided into two pools, A and B, with six teams each. First team from each pool advanced to the final. The final was held on July 17, 2022, between TP Elect-Sport FC and AS Santé (Abéché). TP Elect-Sport FC won 7-6 by penalties after the match finished 0-0.

== Previous winners ==
Champions were:

Season	Champion
1961–62	Renaissance FC (1)
1962–1964	Unknown
1964–65	Renaissance FC (2)
1965–66	Renaissance FC (3)
1966–1971	Unknown
1971–72	Yal Club (1)
1972–73	Yal Club (2)
1973–1978	Unknown
1978–1986	Not held
1986–87	Unknown
1987–88	Elect-Sport FC (1)
1988–89	Renaissance FC (4)
1989–90	Elect-Sport FC (2)
1990–91	Tourbillon FC (1)
1991–92	Elect-Sport FC (3)
1992–93	Postel 2000 FC (1)
1993–94	Renaissance FC Abeché (1)
1994–95	Postel 2000 FC (2)
1995–96	AS CotonTchad (1)
1996–97	Tourbillon FC (2)
1997–98	AS CotonTchad (2)
1998–99	Renaissance FC Abeché (2)
1999–2000	Tourbillon FC (3)
2000–01	Tourbillon FC (4)
2001–02	Renaissance FC (5)
2002–03	Renaissance FC (6)
2003–04	Renaissance FC (7)
2005	Renaissance FC (8)
2006	Renaissance FC (9)
2007	Renaissance FC (10)
2008	Elect-Sport FC (4)
2009–10	Gazelle FC (1)
2010	Tourbillon FC (5)
2011	Foullah Edifice FC (1)
2012	Gazelle FC (2)
2013	Foullah Edifice FC (2)
2014	Foullah Edifice FC (3)
2014–15	Gazelle FC (3)
2016	Not finished
2017	Not finished
2018	Elect-Sport FC (5)
2019	Elect-Sport FC (6)
2020	Gazelle FC (4)
2021	Not held
2022	Elect-Sport FC (7)
2023	AS PSI (1)
2024	Cancelled
2025	Cancelled
2025-26	Aiglons FC (1)

=== Performance By Club ===
Club	City	Titles	Last title
Renaissance FC	N'Djamena	10	2007
Elect-Sport FC	N'Djamena	7	2022
Tourbillon FC	N'Djamena	5	2010
Gazelle FC	N'Djamena	4	2020
Foullah Edifice FC	N'Djamena	3	2014
AS CotonTchad	N'Djamena	2	1998
Postel 2000 FC	N'Djamena	2	1995
Renaissance FC	Abéché	2	1999
AS PSI	N'Djamena	1	2023
Aiglons FC	N’Djamena	1	2025-26

== Competition format ==
=== Competition ===
Since its formation, the league went through many changes in its system and number of participating clubs. The new formula of the national football championship takes place in two phases. The first phase is called a zonal phase, and consists of zones. At the end of the zonal confrontations, clubs start the second phase of the championship. The tournament consists of a group stage and a final. The group stage is divided into two groups, A and B, with six teams each. First team from each group advances to the final. Winner of the final is crowned champion. Teams receive three points for a win and one point for a draw. No points are awarded for a loss.

=== Qualification for African competitions ===
The national champion enters the Champions League preliminary round, while cup winner enters Confederation Cup Preliminary round.

CAF Champions League is open to the winners of all CAF-affiliated national leagues. From the 2004 competition the runner-up of the league of the 12 highest-ranked countries also entered the tournament creating a 64-team field. The 12 countries would be ranked on the performance of their clubs in the previous 5 years. As Chad is not among the best 12 countries, it has only one spot in this competition.

From the top twelve placed CAF member associations, the winner of the domestic cup and the third placed club in the domestic league of the considered associations, are eligible to participate in the CAF Confederation Cup, while only domestic cup winners from member associations ranked from 13 till 55 are eligible to participate in the competition. As Chad is not among the 12 best placed countries, it has only one spot in this competition.

=== Premier League clubs in international competition ===
Chadian clubs started to participate in African competitions in 1990, with RFC N'Djamena being the first Chadian club to enter the African Cup of Champions Clubs. Chadian clubs have never won either Champions League or Confederations Cup. The best result they have achieved was first round of Champions League (RFC N'Djamena in 1990, Elect-Sport in 1991, POSTEL 2000 in 1996, ASCOT N'Djamena in 1997, Tourbillon in 1992, 1998 and 2002, Gazelle in 2010).

== Sponsorship ==
In July 2014 it was announced that mobile operator Airtel signed a deal with FTFA and became its official sponsor. The goal was improving the football in Chad. Airtel has already signed deals with a lot of African football federations.

== Finances ==
Le Fonds National de Développement du Sport (FNDS) is the fund for the development of sports in Chad. It finances national football league among the others. For the season 2014, the FNDS marked off 300 million FCFA. Chadian league faced many financial problems during the years. The national league was interrupted a few times because of this. Season 2015 was suspended for financial reasons, but it resumed after 2 and a half months, after some amount of money was paid by Federation.

== Clubs ==
Location of 2025–26 Chad Premier League clubs

2025–26 Chad Premier League clubs
Club	City	Stadium
Aiglons FC de N'Djamena	N'Djamena	Stade Paris-Congo
AS PSI	N'Djamena	Stade Omnisports Idriss Mahamat Ouya
TP Elect Sport de N'Djamena	N'Djamena	Stade Omnisports Idriss Mahamat Ouya
AS Santé d'Abéché	Abéché	Stade municipal d'Abéché
UDM FC	Moundou	Stade municipal de Moundou
Espoir FC de Bongor	Bongor	Stade de Bongor
Eland de Derby FC	Pala	—
Aiglons FC de Hadjer Lamis	Massaguet	—
FC Onape de Doba	Doba	—
Eléphant FC d'Am Timan	Am Timan	Stade d'Am-Timan
Foullah Edifice FC	Moussoro	—
Scorpion FC de Borkou	Faya-Largeau	—

== Stadiums ==
Five clubs (ASCOT, Elect, Foullah, Gazelle, RFC) play on the same stadium, Stade Omnisports Idriss Mahamat Ouya, also named Stade Nacional, located in N'Djamena. The stadium holds 20,000 people, and has artificial grass. It is also the home ground of the Chad national football team. It is named after former Chadian highjumper Mahamat Idriss (1942—1987). ASCOT Moundou plays its home games on Stade de Moundou. The stadium holds 10,000 people. RFC Abéché plays its home games on Stade de Abéché (capacity 5,000), while Lycod de Doba plays its home games on Stade Omnisports de Doba (capacity 8,000; built in 2008). Mirim Mongo plays on Stade Idriss Miskine. AS Kokaga Sarh plays on Stade Omnisport de Begou.

== Top goalscorers ==
Year	Best scorers	Club	Goals
2003	(Chad) Cyprien Nguembaye	Gazelle FC	12
2005	(Chad) Misdongarde Betolngar	Renaissance FC	7
2010	(Chad) Mahamat Adda 'Abou Deco'	AS CotonTchad	
2012	(Chad) Rodrigue Ninga	Renaissance FC	12
2014	(Chad) Hassane Brahim	Elect-Sport FC	19
2015	(Chad) Beadoum Monde	Gazelle FC	28
2018	(Chad) Mahamat Adda 'Abou Deco'	AS CotonTchad	14
2019	(Chad) Hassane Brahim	Elect-Sport FC	

== 2019 season ==
Group A standings:

#	Football club	W	D	L	Pts
1	Elect-Sport FC	4	1	0	13
2	Renaissance de N'Djaména	4	1	0	13
3	Avenir FC	3	0	2	9
4	AS Eléphant	2	0	3	6
5	AS Commune	1	0	4	3
6	Renaissance de Moussoro	0	0	5	0

Group B standings:

#	Football club	W	D	L	Pts
1	AS CotonTchad	5	0	0	15
2	Gazelle FC	3	0	2	9
3	Educat FC	3	0	2	9
4	Renaissance d'Abéché	2	0	3	6
5	Boule d'Or	1	0	4	3
6	Scorpion de Faya	1	0	4	0

AS CotonTchad won the final against Elect-Sport FC 1-0.

=== Attendances ===
#	Football club	Average attendance
1	AS CotonTchad	1,038
2	Elect-Sport FC	952
3	Renaissance de N'Djaména	913
4	Gazelle FC	831
5	Avenir FC	764
6	Educat FC	692
7	AS Eléphant	635
8	Renaissance d'Abéché	553
9	Boule d'Or de Pala	483
10	Scorpion de Faya	425
11	AS Commune	398
12	Renaissance de Moussoro	376
