= 2012 Africa Cup of Nations Group C =

Football tournament group stage

Group C of the 2012 Africa Cup of Nations ran from 23 January until 31 January. It consisted of Gabon, Morocco, Niger and Tunisia. The matches were held in Gabon. Gabon and Tunisia progressed to the quarterfinals.

== Standings ==
Pos	Team	Pld	W	D	L	GF	GA	GD	Pts	Qualification
1	Gabon (H)	3	3	0	0	6	2	+4	9	Advance to knockout stage
2	Tunisia	3	2	0	1	4	3	+1	6	Advance to knockout stage
3	Morocco	3	1	0	2	4	5	−1	3	
4	Niger	3	0	0	3	1	5	−4	0	

Source: CAF
(H) Hosts

All times are West Africa Time (UTC+1).

== Gabon vs. Niger ==
23 January 2012
17:00

Gabon	2–0	Niger
Aubameyang 31'; N'Guéma 42'	Report

Stade d'Angondjé, Libreville
Attendance: 38,000
Referee: Eddy Maillet (Seychelles)

Gabon	Niger

GK	1	Didier Ovono (c)
DF	5	Bruno Ecuele Manga
DF	4	Rémy Ebanega
DF	3	Edmond Mouele
DF	22	Charly Moussono
MF	7	Stéphane N'Guéma	(yellow card) 68'	(substituted off) 74'
MF	18	Cédric Moubamba
MF	14	Lévy Madinda
MF	15	André Biyogo Poko		(substituted off) 90'
FW	11	Éric Mouloungui
FW	9	Pierre-Emerick Aubameyang		(substituted off) 83'
Substitutions:
MF	13	Bruno Zita Mbanangoyé		(substituted on) 74'
FW	10	Daniel Cousin		(substituted on) 83'
MF	8	Lloyd Palun		(substituted on) 90'
Manager:
(Germany) Gernot Rohr

GK	16	Kassaly Daouda
DF	4	Amadou Kader
DF	15	Sulliman Mazadou		(substituted off) 56'
DF	23	Mohamed Soumaïla
DF	13	Chikoto Mohamed
MF	3	Abdoul-Karim Lancina
MF	6	Idrissa Laouali (c)
MF	14	Boubacar Issoufou		(substituted off) 62'
MF	10	Boubacar Talatou
FW	2	Ouwo Moussa Maazou
FW	11	Alhassane Issoufou	(yellow card) 28'	(substituted off) 42'
Substitutions:
FW	21	Yacouba Ali		(substituted on) 42'
MF	5	Jimmy Bulus		(substituted on) 56'
FW	20	Moutari Amadou		(substituted on) 62'
Manager:
Harouna Gadbe

Assistant referees:
Aboubacar Doumbouya (Guinea)
Aden Range Marwa (Kenya)
Fourth official:
Bakary Gassama (Gambia)

== Morocco vs. Tunisia ==
23 January 2012
20:00

Morocco	1–2	Tunisia
Kharja 86'	Report	Korbi 34'; Msakni 76'

Stade d'Angondjé, Libreville
Attendance: 28,000
Referee: Daniel Bennett (South Africa)

Morocco	Tunisia

GK	1	Nadir Lamyaghri
DF	2	Michaël Chrétien Basser	(yellow card) 57'
DF	3	Badr El Kaddouri	(yellow card) 81'
DF	5	Mehdi Benatia	(yellow card) 33'
DF	4	Ahmed Kantari
MF	14	Mbark Boussoufa		(substituted off) 59'
MF	13	Houssine Kharja (c)
MF	10	Younès Belhanda
MF	17	Marouane Chamakh		(substituted off) 78'
FW	21	Nordin Amrabat
FW	11	Oussama Assaidi		(substituted off) 46'
Substitutions:
MF	7	Adel Taarabt		(substituted on) 46'
FW	20	Youssouf Hadji		(substituted on) 59'
FW	9	Youssef El-Arabi		(substituted on) 78'
Manager:
(Belgium) Eric Gerets

GK	16	Aymen Mathlouthi	(yellow card) 90'
DF	3	Karim Haggui (c)
DF	5	Ammar Jemal	(yellow card) 86'
DF	20	Aymen Abdennour
DF	2	Bilel Ifa
MF	9	Yassine Chikhaoui		(substituted off) 64'
MF	14	Mejdi Traoui
MF	8	Khaled Korbi	(yellow card) 26'
MF	11	Sami Allagui		(substituted off) 56'
FW	15	Zouheir Dhaouadi		(substituted off) 79'
FW	19	Saber Khelifa
Substitutions:
FW	7	Youssef Msakni		(substituted on) 56'
MF	6	Hocine Ragued		(substituted on) 64'
FW	23	Amine Chermiti		(substituted on) 79'
Manager:
Sami Trabelsi

Assistant referees:
Peter Edibe (Nigeria)
Zakhele Siwela (South Africa)
Fourth official:
Janny Sikazwe (Zambia)

== Niger vs. Tunisia ==
27 January 2012
17:00

Niger	1–2	Tunisia
N'Gounou 9'	Report	Msakni 4'; Jemâa 89'

Stade d'Angondjé, Libreville
Attendance: 20,000
Referee: Janny Sikazwe (Zambia)

Niger	Tunisia

GK	16	Kassaly Daouda
DF	5	Jimmy Bulus		(substituted off) 90'
DF	13	Chikoto Mohamed
DF	18	Koffi Dan Kowa
DF	23	Mohamed Soumaïla
MF	3	Lassina Abdoul Karim (c)	(yellow card) 45'
MF	8	Olivier Bonnes
MF	14	Boubacar Issoufou		(substituted off) 84'
MF	17	William Tonji N'Gounou		(substituted off) 70'
MF	21	Yacouba Ali
FW	2	Ouwo Moussa Maazou
Substitutions:
FW	9	Daouda Kamilou		(substituted on) 70'
MF	6	Idrissa Laouali		(substituted on) 84'
FW	11	Alhassane Issoufou		(substituted on) 90'
Manager:
(France) Rolland Courbis

GK	16	Aymen Mathlouthi
DF	3	Karim Haggui (c)	(yellow card) 78'
DF	5	Ammar Jemal
DF	20	Aymen Abdennour
DF	2	Bilel Ifa	(yellow card) 10'
MF	9	Yassine Chikhaoui		(substituted off) 66'
MF	14	Mejdi Traoui	(yellow card) 53'
MF	8	Khaled Korbi
MF	7	Youssef Msakni
FW	15	Zouheir Dhaouadi		(substituted off) 50'
FW	23	Amine Chermiti		(substituted off) 45'
Substitutions:
FW	17	Issam Jemâa		(substituted on) 45'
MF	10	Oussama Darragi		(substituted on) 50'
FW	11	Sami Allagui		(substituted on) 66'
Manager:
Sami Trabelsi

Assistant referees:
Angesom Ogbamariam (Eritrea)
Balkrishna Bootun (Mauritius)
Fourth official:
Neant Alioum (Cameroon)

== Gabon vs. Morocco ==
27 January 2012
20:00

Gabon	3–2	Morocco
Aubameyang 76'; Cousin 79'; Mbanangoyé 90+10'	Report	Kharja 24', 90+1' (pen.)

Stade d'Angondjé, Libreville
Attendance: 35,000
Referee: Bakary Gassama (Gambia)

Gabon	Morocco

GK	1	Didier Ovono (c)
DF	3	Edmond Mouele
DF	4	Rémy Ebanega
DF	5	Bruno Ecuele Manga
DF	22	Charly Moussono
MF	15	André Biyogo Poko	(yellow card) 9'	(substituted off) 90'
MF	18	Cédric Moubamba
MF	9	Pierre-Emerick Aubameyang
MF	14	Lévy Madinda
MF	7	Stéphane N'Guéma		(substituted off) 46'
FW	11	Éric Mouloungui		(substituted off) 85'
Substitutions:
FW	10	Daniel Cousin		(substituted on) 46'
MF	13	Bruno Zita Mbanangoyé		(substituted on) 85'
MF	8	Lloyd Palun		(substituted on) 90'
Manager:
(Germany) Gernot Rohr

GK	1	Nadir Lamyaghri
DF	2	Michaël Chrétien Basser		(substituted off) 72'
DF	5	Mehdi Benatia	(yellow card) 90'
DF	4	Ahmed Kantari
DF	3	Badr El Kaddouri
MF	6	Adil Hermach	(yellow card) 27'
MF	13	Houssine Kharja (c)
MF	10	Younès Belhanda	(yellow card) 54'
MF	20	Youssouf Hadji
MF	19	Mehdi Carcela-Gonzalez		(substituted off) 66'
FW	9	Youssef El-Arabi		(substituted off) 46'
Substitutions:
MF	21	Nordin Amrabat		(substituted on) 46'
MF	7	Adel Taarabt		(substituted on) 66'
DF	16	Jamal Alioui		(substituted on) 72'
Manager:
(Belgium) Eric Gerets

Assistant referees:
Songuifolo Yeo (Ivory Coast)
Felicien Kabanda (Rwanda)
Fourth official:
Noumandiez Doué (Ivory Coast)

== Gabon vs. Tunisia ==
31 January 2012
19:00

Gabon	1–0	Tunisia
Aubameyang 61'	Report

Stade de Franceville, Franceville
Attendance: 22,000
Referee: Noumandiez Doué (Ivory Coast)

Gabon	Tunisia

GK	1	Didier Ovono
DF	5	Bruno Ecuele Manga
DF	17	Moïse Brou Apanga	(yellow card) 76'
DF	3	Edmond Mouele		(substituted off) 72'
DF	22	Charly Moussono
MF	13	Bruno Zita Mbanangoyé	(yellow card) 65'	(substituted off) 89'
MF	8	Lloyd Palun
MF	15	André Biyogo Poko
FW	10	Daniel Cousin (c)
FW	21	Roguy Méyé		(substituted off) 46'
FW	9	Pierre-Emerick Aubameyang
Substitutions:
MF	14	Lévy Madinda		(substituted on) 46'
DF	4	Rémy Ebanega		(substituted on) 72'
DF	2	Georges Ambourouet		(substituted on) 89'
Manager:
(Germany) Gernot Rohr

GK	22	Rami Jridi
DF	18	Anis Boussaïdi	(yellow card) 37'
DF	20	Aymen Abdennour	(yellow card) 82'
DF	12	Khalil Chemmam	(yellow card) 19'
DF	2	Bilel Ifa
MF	6	Hocine Ragued	(yellow card) 72'
MF	21	Jamel Saihi
MF	13	Wissem Ben Yahia		(substituted off) 71'
FW	17	Issam Jemâa (c)		(substituted off) 70'
FW	19	Saber Khelifa		(substituted off) 82'
FW	7	Youssef Msakni
Substitutions:
FW	11	Sami Allagui		(substituted on) 70'
FW	9	Yassine Chikhaoui		(substituted on) 71'
MF	10	Oussama Darragi		(substituted on) 82'
Manager:
Sami Trabelsi

Assistant referees:
Evarist Menkouande (Cameroon)
Yanoussa Moussa (Cameroon)
Fourth official:
Eddy Maillet (Seychelles)

== Niger vs. Morocco ==
31 January 2012
19:00

Niger	0–1	Morocco
	Report	Belhanda 78'

Stade d'Angondjé, Libreville
Attendance: 4,000
Referee: Hamada Nampiandraza (Madagascar)

Niger	Morocco

GK	16	Kassaly Daouda
DF	23	Mohamed Soumaïla
DF	13	Chikoto Mohamed
DF	5	Jimmy Bulus
DF	18	Koffi Dan Kowa
MF	3	Lassina Abdoul Karim
MF	8	Olivier Bonnes		(substituted off) 46'
MF	21	Yacouba Ali		(substituted off) 81'
MF	14	Issoufou Boubacar Garba
MF	17	William N'Gounou		(substituted off) 61'
FW	2	Ouwo Moussa Maazou (c)	(yellow card) 78'
Substitutions:
DF	19	Issiaka Koudize	(yellow card) 52'	(substituted on) 46'
FW	11	Alhassane Issoufou		(substituted on) 61'
FW	9	Daouda Kamilou		(substituted on) 81'
Manager:
Harouna Doula Gabde

GK	12	Mohamed Amsif
DF	3	Badr El Kaddouri
DF	16	Jamal Alioui
DF	18	Abdelfettah Boukhriss	(yellow card) 46'
DF	23	Mustapha Mrani
MF	8	Karim El Ahmadi
MF	14	Mbark Boussoufa
MF	13	Houssine Kharja (c)		(substituted off) 41'
MF	10	Younès Belhanda		(substituted off) 90+2'
FW	20	Youssouf Hadji		(substituted off) 65'
FW	17	Marouane Chamakh
Substitutions:
MF	6	Adil Hermach	(yellow card) 41'	(substituted on) 41'
MF	19	Mehdi Carcela-Gonzalez		(substituted on) 65'
MF	21	Nordin Amrabat		(substituted on) 90+2'
Manager:
(Belgium) Eric Gerets

Assistant referees:
Jason Damoo (Seychelles)
Marwa Range (Kenya)
Fourth official:
Neant Alioum (Cameroon)
