= 2013 Africa Cup of Nations Group B =

Football tournament group stage

Group B of the 2013 Africa Cup of Nations ran from 20 January until 28 January. It consisted of Ghana, Mali, Niger and Congo DR. The matches were held in the South African cities of Port Elizabeth and Durban.

== Standings ==
Pos	Team	Pld	W	D	L	GF	GA	GD	Pts	Qualification
1	Ghana	3	2	1	0	6	2	+4	7	Advance to knockout stage
2	Mali	3	1	1	1	2	2	0	4	Advance to knockout stage
3	DR Congo	3	0	3	0	3	3	0	3	
4	Niger	3	0	1	2	0	4	−4	1	

Source: CAF

All times South African Standard Time (UTC+2)

== Ghana vs. Congo DR ==
20 January 2013
17:00

Ghana	2–2	DR Congo
Agyemang-Badu 40'; Asamoah 49'	Report	Mputu 53'; Mbokani 69' (pen.)

Nelson Mandela Bay Stadium, Port Elizabeth
Attendance: 7,000
Referee: Daniel Bennett (South Africa)

Ghana	Congo DR

GK	16	Fatau Dauda
RB	4	John Paintsil
CB	21	John Boye
CB	13	Jerry Akaminko
LB	20	Kwadwo Asamoah
DM	9	Derek Boateng		(substituted off) 73'
RM	10	Albert Adomah	(yellow card) 42'	(substituted off) 80'
CM	8	Emmanuel Agyemang-Badu
CM	22	Mubarak Wakaso	(yellow card) 54'
LM	7	Christian Atsu		(substituted off) 56'
CF	3	Asamoah Gyan (c)
Substitutions:
MF	11	Mohammed Rabiu		(substituted on) 56'
MF	6	Anthony Annan		(substituted on) 73'
DF	23	Harrison Afful		(substituted on) 80'
Manager:
James Kwesi Appiah

GK	1	Muteba Kidiaba
RB	2	Issama Mpeko
CB	5	Larrys Mabiala
CB	17	Cédric Mongongu	(substituted off) 74'
LB	3	Kilitcho Kasusula
CM	7	Youssouf Mulumbu
CM	18	Cédric Makiadi
RW	4	Mulota Kabangu	(substituted off) 68'
LW	15	Lomana LuaLua	(substituted off) 64'
SS	8	Trésor Mputu (c)
CF	9	Dieumerci Mbokani
Substitutions:
FW	11	Déo Kanda	(substituted on) 64'
FW	13	Dioko Kaluyituka	(substituted on) 68'
DF	21	Gabriel Zakuani	(substituted on) 74'
Manager:
(France) Claude Le Roy

Man of the Match:
Emmanuel Agyemang-Badu (Ghana)

Assistant referees:
Zakhele Siwela (South Africa)
Marwa Range (Kenya)
Fourth official:
Gehad Grisha (Egypt)

== Mali vs. Niger ==
20 January 2013
20:00

Mali	1–0	Niger
Keita 84'	Report

Nelson Mandela Bay Stadium, Port Elizabeth
Attendance: 20,000
Referee: Slim Jedidi (Tunisia)

Mali	Niger

GK	1	Mamadou Samassa	(yellow card) 90+4'
RB	2	Fousseni Diawara
CB	21	Mahamadou N'Diaye
CB	13	Molla Wague
LB	3	Adama Tamboura
RM	8	Mohamed Kalilou Traoré		(substituted off) 63'
CM	12	Seydou Keita (c)
LM	17	Mahamane Traoré
RW	7	Cheick Fantamady Diarra		(substituted off) 46'
LW	11	Sigamary Diarra		(substituted off) 79'
CF	9	Cheick Diabaté
Substitutions:
FW	15	Mahamadou Samassa		(substituted on) 46'
MF	6	Mohamed Sissoko		(substituted on) 63'
MF	20	Samba Diakité		(substituted on) 79'
Manager:
(France) Patrice Carteron

GK	16	Kassaly Daouda
RB	21	Mohamed Bachar
CB	18	Koffi Dan Kowa
CB	13	Mohamed Chikoto
LB	8	Kourouma Fatoukouma
CM	23	Mohamed Soumaïla	(yellow card) 48'
CM	3	Lassina Abdoul Karim
RW	19	Issiaka Koudize		(substituted off) 88'
LW	14	Issoufou Boubacar Garba	(yellow card) 74'	(substituted off) 78'
CF	7	Modibo Sidibé
CF	2	Moussa Maâzou (c)
Substitutions:
MF	10	Boubacar Talatou		(substituted on) 78'
FW	11	Alhassane Issoufou		(substituted on) 88'
Manager:
(Germany) Gernot Rohr

Man of the Match:
Seydou Keita (Mali)

Assistant referees:
Bechir Hassani (Tunisia)
Anouar Hmila (Tunisia)
Fourth official:
Bouchaïb El Ahrach (Morocco)

== Ghana vs. Mali ==
24 January 2013
17:00

Ghana	1–0	Mali
Wakaso 38' (pen.)	Report

Nelson Mandela Bay Stadium, Port Elizabeth
Attendance: 8,000
Referee: Noumandiez Doué (Ivory Coast)

Ghana	Mali

GK	16	Fatau Dauda	(yellow card) 7'
RB	4	John Paintsil	(yellow card) 69'
CB	15	Isaac Vorsah
CB	21	John Boye
LB	23	Harrison Afful
CM	8	Emmanuel Agyemang-Badu
CM	11	Mohammed Rabiu	(yellow card) 63'
RW	10	Albert Adomah		(substituted off) 84'
LW	22	Mubarak Wakaso	(yellow card) 39'	(substituted off) 71'
SS	20	Kwadwo Asamoah		(substituted off) 77'
CF	3	Asamoah Gyan (c)
Substitutions:
FW	7	Christian Atsu		(substituted on) 71'
MF	9	Derek Boateng		(substituted on) 77'
MF	14	Solomon Asante		(substituted on) 84'
Manager:
James Kwesi Appiah

GK	1	Mamadou Samassa
RB	2	Fousseni Diawara
CB	4	Adama Coulibaly	(yellow card) 68'
CB	21	Mahamadou N'Diaye	(yellow card) 49'
LB	3	Adama Tamboura
DM	20	Samba Diakité
CM	12	Seydou Keita (c)
CM	6	Mohamed Sissoko		(substituted off) 68'
RW	17	Mahamane Traoré	(yellow card) 73'	(substituted off) 76'
LW	11	Sigamary Diarra		(substituted off) 46'
CF	9	Cheick Diabaté
Substitutions:
FW	10	Modibo Maïga		(substituted on) 46'
MF	18	Samba Sow		(substituted on) 68'
FW	15	Mahamadou Samassa		(substituted on) 76'
Manager:
(France) Patrice Carteron

Man of the Match:
Emmanuel Agyemang-Badu (Ghana)

Assistant referees:
Yéo Songuifolo (Ivory Coast)
Jean-Claude Birumushahu (Burundi)
Fourth official:
Mohamed Benouza (Algeria)

== Niger vs. Congo DR ==
24 January 2013
20:00

Niger	0–0	DR Congo
	Report

Nelson Mandela Bay Stadium, Port Elizabeth
Attendance: 12,000
Referee: Bouchaïb El Ahrach (Morocco)

Niger	Congo DR

GK	16	Kassaly Daouda
RB	21	Mohamed Bachar
CB	13	Mohamed Chikoto
CB	18	Koffi Dan Kowa
LB	8	Kourouma Fatoukouma
CM	19	Issiaka Koudize		(substituted off) 79'
CM	23	Mohamed Soumaïla
RW	2	Moussa Maâzou (c)	(yellow card) 41'
AM	3	Lassina Abdoul Karim
LW	14	Issoufou Boubacar Garba		(substituted off) 46'
CF	7	Modibo Sidibé		(substituted off) 90'
Substitutions:
MF	10	Boubacar Talatou		(substituted on) 46'
MF	17	William N'Gounou	(yellow card) 82'	(substituted on) 79'
FW	11	Alhassane Issoufou		(substituted on) 90'
Manager:
(Germany) Gernot Rohr

GK	1	Muteba Kidiaba
RB	2	Issama Mpeko
CB	5	Larrys Mabiala
CB	17	Cédric Mongongu
LB	3	Kilitcho Kasusula
CM	7	Youssouf Mulumbu
CM	18	Cédric Makiadi
RW	4	Mulota Kabangu		(substituted off) 56'
LW	15	Lomana LuaLua		(substituted off) 46'
CF	9	Dieumerci Mbokani	(yellow card) 87'
CF	8	Trésor Mputu (c)		(substituted off) 72'
Substitutions:
MF	11	Déo Kanda		(substituted on) 46'
MF	13	Dioko Kaluyituka		(substituted on) 56'
MF	10	Zola Matumona		(substituted on) 72'
Manager:
(France) Claude Le Roy

Man of the Match:
Kassaly Daouda (Niger)

Assistant referees:
Redouane Achik (Morocco)
Ali Waleed Ahmed (Sudan)
Fourth official:
Eric Otogo-Castane (Gabon)

== Niger vs. Ghana ==
28 January 2013
19:00

Niger	0–3	Ghana
	Report	Gyan 6'; Atsu 23'; Boye 49'

Nelson Mandela Bay Stadium, Port Elizabeth
Attendance: 10,000
Referee: Badara Diatta (Senegal)

Niger	Ghana

GK	16	Kassaly Daouda
RB	21	Mohamed Bachar		(substituted off) 60'
CB	13	Mohamed Chikoto	(yellow card) 25'
CB	18	Koffi Dan Kowa	(yellow card) 51'
LB	8	Kourouma Fatoukouma
DM	3	Lassina Abdoul Karim
CM	19	Issiaka Koudize	(yellow card) 21'	(substituted off) 61'
CM	23	Mohamed Soumaïla	(yellow card) 87'
RW	2	Moussa Maâzou (c)
LW	10	Boubacar Talatou
CF	7	Modibo Sidibé		(substituted off) 79'
Substitutions:
DF	4	Kader Amadou		(substituted on) 60'
MF	14	Issoufou Boubacar Garba		(substituted on) 61'
FW	11	Alhassane Issoufou		(substituted on) 79'
Manager:
(Germany) Gernot Rohr

GK	16	Fatau Dauda
RB	4	John Paintsil
CB	21	John Boye
CB	15	Isaac Vorsah
LB	23	Harrison Afful
DM	11	Mohammed Rabiu		(substituted off) 72'
RM	10	Albert Adomah		(substituted off) 63'
CM	8	Emmanuel Agyemang-Badu	(yellow card) 33'
LM	7	Christian Atsu
AM	20	Kwadwo Asamoah
CF	3	Asamoah Gyan (c)		(substituted off) 78'
Substitutions:
MF	14	Solomon Asante		(substituted on) 63'
MF	9	Derek Boateng		(substituted on) 72'
FW	17	Emmanuel Clottey		(substituted on) 78'
Manager:
James Kwesi Appiah

Man of the Match:
Christian Atsu (Ghana)

Assistant referees:
Djibril Camara (Senegal)
Arsénio Chadreque Marengula (Mozambique)
Fourth official:
Rajindraparsad Seechurn (Mauritius)

== Congo DR vs. Mali ==
28 January 2013
19:00

DR Congo	1–1	Mali
Mbokani 3' (pen.)	Report	Mah. Samassa 15'

Moses Mabhida Stadium, Durban
Attendance: 8,000
Referee: Djamel Haimoudi (Algeria)

Congo DR	Mali

GK	1	Muteba Kidiaba
RB	2	Issama Mpeko
CB	21	Gabriel Zakuani
CB	17	Cédric Mongongu
LB	3	Kilitcho Kasusula
CM	18	Cédric Makiadi	(yellow card) 77'
CM	7	Youssouf Mulumbu (c)	(yellow card) 21'
RW	13	Dioko Kaluyituka		(substituted off) 79'
LW	15	Lomana LuaLua		(substituted off) 46'
CF	9	Dieumerci Mbokani
CF	12	Yves Diba Ilunga		(substituted off) 86'
Substitutions:
FW	8	Trésor Mputu		(substituted on) 46'
FW	11	Déo Kanda		(substituted on) 79'
MF	4	Mulota Kabangu		(substituted on) 86'
Manager:
(France) Claude Le Roy

GK	1	Mamadou Samassa	(yellow card) 64'
RB	2	Fousseni Diawara
CB	4	Adama Coulibaly
CB	13	Molla Wague
LB	3	Adama Tamboura	(yellow card) 52'
DM	6	Mohamed Sissoko		(substituted off) 72'
CM	12	Seydou Keita (c)	(yellow card) 32'
CM	18	Samba Sow	(yellow card) 33'
RW	20	Samba Diakité		(substituted off) 87'
LW	10	Modibo Maïga
CF	15	Mahamadou Samassa		(substituted off) 78'
Substitutions:
MF	8	Mohamed Kalilou Traoré	(yellow card) 85'	(substituted on) 72'
FW	9	Cheick Diabaté		(substituted on) 78'
FW	11	Sigamary Diarra		(substituted on) 87'
Manager:
(France) Patrice Carteron

Man of the Match:
Seydou Keita (Mali)

Assistant referees:
Redouane Achik (Morocco)
Jerson Emiliano Dos Santos (Angola)
Fourth official:
Sylvester Kirwa (Kenya)
