= Niger national football team results =

Niger national football team results is list of Niger national football team fixtures and results.

These are the fixtures and results of the Niger national football team:

== Fixtures ==
=== 1964–1979 ===
26 December 1964

| Niger | 2–4 | Benin |

Lagos

27 December 1964

| Niger | 2–2 | Upper Volta |

Lagos

29 December 1964

| Niger | 0–2 | Togo |

Lagos

1 January 1965

| Nigeria | 4–0 | Niger |

Lagos

1 August 1967

| Niger | 2–3 | Upper Volta |

Unknown

19 January 1969

| Benin | 1–1 | Niger |

Dahomey

17 August 1969

| Ghana | 6–0 | Niger |

Accra

21 September 1969

| Niger | 1–9 | Ghana |

Niamey

22 March 1970

| Burkina Faso | 3–3 | Niger |

Upper Volta

12 December 1970

| Niger | 0–1 | Mali |

Niamey

27 December 1970

| Mali | 3–1 | Niger |

Bamako

1 January 1972

| Benin | 2–1 | Niger |

Dahomey

1 January 1972

| Niger | 2–2 | Benin |

Niger

1 January 1972

| Niger | 0–2 | Upper Volta |

Niger

1 January 1972

| Upper Volta | 2–0 | Niger |

Upper Volta

14 September 1975

| Niger | 2–4 | Guinea |

Niger

28 September 1975

| Guinea | 3–0 | Niger |

Guinea

7 March 1976

| Sierra Leone | 5–1 | Niger |

Freetown

21 March 1976

| Niger | 2–1 | Sierra Leone |

Niamey

28 October 1979

| Niger | 1–0 | Benin |

Abidjan

=== 1980–1995 ===
16 July 1980

| Niger | 0–0 | Somalia |

Niamey

27 July 1980

| Somalia | 1–1 | Niger |

Mogadiscio

3 October 1980

| Congo | 4–0 | Niger |

Brazzaville

14 December 1980

| Niger | 0–1 | Togo |

Niamey

28 December 1980

| Togo | 1–2 | Niger |

Lome

1 April 1981

| Cameroon | 2–0 | Niger |

Cameroon

1 May 1981

| Algeria | 4–0 | Niger |

Constantine

31 May 1981

| Niger | 1–0 | Algeria |

Niamey

6 September 1981

| Niger | 2–1 | Upper Volta |

Niamey

15 February 1982

| Benin | 2–0 | Niger |

Cotonou

17 February 1982

| Ghana | 2–2 | Niger |

Cotonou

19 February 1982

| Ivory Coast | 1–1 | Niger |

Cotonou

3 October 1982

| Upper Volta | 1–1 | Niger |

Bobo Dioulasso

14 November 1982

| Niger | 0–0 | Senegal |

Niamey

28 November 1982

| Senegal | 1–0 | Niger |

Dakar

23 January 1983

| Niger | 2–0 | Senegal |

Niger

6 February 1983

| Senegal | 2–0 (a.e.t.) | Niger |

Senegal

26 June 1983

| Niger | 1–0 | Mauritania |

Niger

14 July 1983

| Mauritania | 0–0 | Niger |

Mauritania

13 November 1983

| Niger | 1–1 | Mali |

Niamey

14 November 1983

| Niger | 1–1 | Mali |

Niamey

30 July 1984

| Niger | 0–1 | Ghana |

Bobo Dioulasso

23 September 1984

| Niger | 1–3 | Ivory Coast |

Niamey

24 February 1986

| Ghana | 2–0 | Niger |

Accra

25 February 1986

| Niger | 0–3 | Liberia |

Accra

26 February 1986

| Burkina Faso | 0–0 | Niger |

Accra

28 February 1986

| Niger | 3–1 | Togo |

Accra

1 March 1986

| Togo | 3–1 | Niger |

Accra

2 March 1986

| Burkina Faso | 1–2 | Niger |

Accra

25 January 1987

| Niger | 1–0 | Mali |

Niamey

2 February 1987

| Niger | 0–4 | Ghana |

Monrovia

4 February 1987

| Niger | 0–1 | Ivory Coast |

Monrovia

24 July 1988

| Burkina Faso | 1–0 | Niger |

Ouagadougou

19 August 1990

| Morocco | 2–0 | Niger |

Morocco

30 September 1990

| Niger | 0–1 | Ivory Coast |

Niger

14 October 1990

| Niger | 7–1 | Mauritania |

Niger

27 January 1991

| Niger | 1–0 | Morocco |

Niger

30 April 1991

| Ivory Coast | 1–0 | Niger |

Côte d'Ivoire

26 July 1991

| Mauritania | 0–1 | Niger |

Mauritania

23 November 1991

| Ivory Coast | 5–2 | Niger |

Abidjan

9 August 1992

| Libya | 0–0 | Niger |

Tripoli

16 August 1992

| Benin | 1–2 | Niger |

Cotonou

30 August 1992

| Niger | 1–3 | Gabon |

Niamey

18 October 1992

| Niger | 0–2 | Mali |

Niamey

| 25 October 1992 | Niger | 0–0 | Ivory Coast | Niamey, Niger |
| | | | | Referee: Kinder (Ghana) |

15 November 1992

| Niger | 0–1 | Mali |

Unknown

13 December 1992

| Niger | 0–1 | Ghana |

Niamey

| 20 December 1992 | Botswana | 0–1 | Niger | Gaborone, Botswana |
| | | | Natanga 32' | Referee: Mabuza (Swaziland) |

| 23 January 1993 | Ghana | 4–0 | Niger | Kumasi, Ghana |

| 31 January 1993 | Ivory Coast | 1–0 | Niger | Abidjan, Côte d'Ivoire |
| | A. Traoré 54' | | | Referee: Camara (Guinea) |

| 28 February 1993 | Niger | 2–1 | Botswana | Niamey, Niger |
| | Yahaya 24'; M. Ida 89' | | D. Otto 42' | Referee: Magassa (Mali) |

3 April 1993

| Niger | 2–2 | Benin |

Niamey, Niger

11 April 1993

| Niger | 0–0 | Cameroon |

Niger

25 April 1993

| Niger | 4–1 | Benin |

Niger

| 7 July 1993 | Ivory Coast | 3–2 | Niger | Abidjan, Côte d'Ivoire |

11 July 1993

| Gabon | 3–0 | Niger |

Gabon

25 July 1993

| Cameroon | 2–0 | Niger |

Cameroon

29 January 1994

| Ivory Coast | 5–3 | Niger |

Ouagadougou, Burkina Faso

30 January 1994

| Niger | 3–1 | Guinea |

Ouagadougou, Burkina Faso

17 March 1994

| Tunisia | 4–2 | Niger |

Rades, Tunisia

14 August 1994

| Niger | 0–0 | Togo |

Niamey, Niger

| 16 August 1994 | Niger | 3–2 | Togo | Niamey, Niger |

9 October 1994

| Senegal | 3–1 | Niger |

Dakar, Senegal

16 October 1994

| Niger | 1–5 | Ghana |

Niamey, Niger

| 13 November 1994 | Niger | 4–2 | Sierra Leone | Niamey, Niger |

8 January 1995

| Congo | 3–1 | Niger |

Brazzaville, Republic of the Congo

22 January 1995

| Niger | 1–1 | Gambia |

Niamey, Niger

23 April 1995

| Ghana | 1–0 | Niger |

Accra, Ghana

3 June 1995

| Sierra Leone | 5–1 | Niger |

Freetown, Sierra Leone

=== 1996–2009 ===
| Date | Venue | Opponents | Score | Competition | Scorers | Att. | Ref. |
|---|---|---|---|---|---|---|---|
| 12 May 1996 | Stade du 4 Août, Ouagadougou, Burkina Faso (A) | Burkina Faso | 0–0 | Friendly | — | | |
| 30 January 1998 | Niamey, Niger | Namibia | 2–1 | | | | |
| 5 February 1998 | Marrakesh, Morocco | Morocco | 0–3 | Friendly | — | 8,000 | |
| 2 August 1998 | Niger | Liberia | 2–1 | | | | |
| 16 August 1998 | Liberia | Liberia | 0–2 | | — | | |
| 2 July 2000 | Niamey | Ivory Coast | 0–1 | | — | | |
| 16 July 2000 | Abidjan | Ivory Coast | 0–6 | | — | | |
| 7 September 2002 | Niamey | Ethiopia | 3–1 | | Tankari 55', 61', Abdoulaye 80' | | |
| 3 October 2002 | Rabat, Morocco | Morocco | 1–6 | Friendly | Djibo | | |
| 12 October 2002 | Monrovia | Liberia | 0–1 | | — | | |
| 7 March 2003 | Cotonou, Benin | Benin | 1–1 (1–3 p) | Friendly | | | |
| 30 March 2003 | Conakry | Guinea | 0–2 | | | | |
| 7 June 2003 | Niamey | Guinea | 1–0 | | Tankary 70' | | |
| 22 June 2003 | Addis Ababa | Ethiopia | 0–2 | | | | |
| 5 July 2003 | Niamey | Liberia | 1–0 | | Alassane 90' | | |
| 11 October 2003 | Stade Général Seyni Kountché, Niamey | Algeria | 0–1 | 2006 FIFA World Cup qualification | — | 20,126 | |
| 14 November 2003 | Stade 5 Juillet 1962, Algiers | Algeria | 0–6 | 2006 FIFA World Cup qualification | — | 53,200 | |
| 29 August 2006 | Lomé, Togo | Togo | 1–1 | Friendly | | | |
| 2 September 2006 | Abuja Stadium, Abuja | Nigeria | 0–2 | | | | |
| 8 October 2006 | Général Seyni Kountché Stadion, Niamey | Uganda | 0–0 | | | | |
| 25 March 2007 | Setsoto National Stadium, Maseru, Lesotho (A) | Lesotho | 1–3 | | Kamilou 80' | | |
| 3 June 2007 | Stade Général Seyni Kountché, Niamey, Niger (H) | Lesotho | 2–0 | | Djibo 10', Sako 36' | | |
| 17 June 2007 | Stade Général Seyni Kountché, Niamey, Niger (H) | Nigeria | 1–3 | | Kamilou 68' | | |
| 8 September 2007 | Nelson Mandela National Stadium, Kampala, Uganda (A) | Uganda | 1–3 | | Idrissa 45' | | |
| 21 November 2007 | Malabo, Equatorial Guinea (A) | Equatorial Guinea | 1–1 | Friendly | Maâzou | | |
| 31 May 2008 | Nelson Mandela National Stadium, Kampala, Uganda (A) | Uganda | 0–1 | 2010 FIFA World Cup qualification | — | 25,000 | |
| 8 June 2008 | Stade Général Seyni Kountché, Niamey, Niger (H) | Angola | 1–2 | 2010 FIFA World Cup qualification | Alassane 3' | 23,000 | |
| 14 June 2008 | Stade Général Seyni Kountché, Niamey, Niger (H) | Benin | 0–2 | 2010 FIFA World Cup qualification | — | 5,000 | |
| 22 June 2008 | Stade de l'Amitié, Cotonou, Benin (A) | Benin | 0–2 | 2010 FIFA World Cup qualification | — | 25,000 | |
| 28 August 2008 | Tripoli, Libya (A) | Libya | 2–6 | Friendly | | | |
| 7 September 2008 | Stade Général Seyni Kountché, Niamey, Niger (H) | Uganda | 3–1 | | Issoufou 68', 85', Kamilou 87' | 5,000 | |
| 12 October 2008 | Estádio dos Coqueiros, Luanda, Angola (A) | Angola | 1–3 | 2010 FIFA World Cup qualification | Moussa 20' | 3,200 | |

=== 2010–2019 ===
| Date | Venue | Opponents | Score | Competition | Scorers | Att. | Ref. |
|---|---|---|---|---|---|---|---|
| 19 June 2010 | Niamey, Niger | Chad | 1–1 | Friendly | Dan Kowa 90' | | |
| 11 August 2010 | Porto-Novo, Benin | Benin | 0–0 | Friendly | — | | |
| 4 September 2010 | Mbombela Stadium, Mbombela (A) | South Africa | 0–2 | 2012 Africa Cup of Nations qualification | — | | |
| 10 October 2010 | Stade Général Seyni Kountché, Niamey (H) | Egypt | 1–0 | 2012 Africa Cup of Nations qualification | Maâzou 34' | 30,000 | |
| 17 November 2010 | Tripoli, Libya | Libya | 1–1 | Friendly | Maâzou 73' | | |
| 9 February 2011 | Marrakesh, Morocco | Morocco | 0–3 | Friendly | — | | |
| 27 March 2011 | Niamey, Niger | Sierra Leone | 3–1 | 2012 Africa Cup of Nations qualification | Issoufou 64', Sidibé 79', Daouda 89' | | |
| 4 June 2011 | Freetown, Sierra Leone | Sierra Leone | 0–1 | 2012 Africa Cup of Nations qualification | — | | |
| 10 August 2011 | Niamey, Niger | Togo | 3–3 | Friendly | Maâzou 45', 70', Daouda 80' | | |
| 14 August 2011 | Monrovia, Liberia | Liberia | 0–0 | Friendly | — | | |
| 4 September 2011 | Niamey, Niger | South Africa | 2–1 | 2012 Africa Cup of Nations qualification | Dan Kowa 15', Maâzou 47' | | |
| 6 September 2011 | Nice, France | Gabon | 0–1 | Friendly | — | | |
| 8 October 2011 | Cairo, Egypt | Egypt | 0–3 | 2012 Africa Cup of Nations qualification | — | | |
| 15 November 2011 | Niamey, Niger | Botswana | 1–1 | | N'Gounou | | |
| 23 January 2012 | Stade d'Angondjé, Libreville (N) | Gabon | 0–2 | 2012 Africa Cup of Nations | — | 38,000 | |
| 27 January 2012 | Stade d'Angondjé, Libreville (N) | Tunisia | 1–2 | 2012 Africa Cup of Nations | N'Gounou 9' | 20,000 | |
| 31 January 2012 | Stade d'Angondjé, Libreville (N) | Morocco | 0–1 | 2012 Africa Cup of Nations | — | 4,000 | |
| 29 February 2012 | Doha, Qatar | Egypt | 0–1 | | — | | |
| 26 May 2012 | Blida, Algeria | Algeria | 0–3 | Friendly | — | | |
| 3 June 2012 | Stade Général Seyni Kountché, Niamey (H) | Gabon | 3–0 (Note: Though the match finished 0–0, Niger were later awarded a 3–0 win as Gabon fielded an ineligible player.) | 2014 FIFA World Cup qualification | — | 20,000 | |
| 9 June 2012 | Stade Municipal, Pointe Noire (A) | Congo | 0–1 | 2014 FIFA World Cup qualification | — | 10,500 | |
| 9 September 2012 | Conakry, Guinea | Guinea | 0–1 | 2013 Africa Cup of Nations qualification | — | | |
| 9 October 2012 | Niamey, Niger | Liberia | 4–3 | Friendly | — | | |
| 14 October 2012 | Stade Général Seyni Kountché, Niamey (H) | Guinea | 2–0 | 2013 Africa Cup of Nations qualification | Chikoto 74', Issoufou 85' | | |
| 30 December 2012 | Addis Abeba, Ethiopia | Ethiopia | 0–1 | Friendly | — | | |
| 5 January 2013 | Stade Général Seyni Kountché, Niamey (H) | Togo | 3–1 | Friendly | Issoufou 17', Chikoto 60', Maâzouu 90' | | |
| 10 January 2013 | Mbombela Stadium, Mbombela (A) | Burkina Faso | 0–0 | Friendly | — | | |
| 13 January 2013 | Stade de Kégué, Lomé (A) | Togo | 2–1 | Friendly | Fessou 5', Ayité 90' | | |
| 20 January 2013 | Nelson Mandela Bay Stadium, Port Elizabeth (N) | Mali | 0–1 | 2013 Africa Cup of Nations | — | 20,000 | |
| 24 January 2013 | Nelson Mandela Bay Stadium, Port Elizabeth (N) | DR Congo | 0–0 | 2013 Africa Cup of Nations | — | 12,000 | |
| 28 January 2013 | Nelson Mandela Bay Stadium, Port Elizabeth (N) | Ghana | 0–3 | 2013 Africa Cup of Nations | — | 10,000 | |
| 10 June 2017 | Stade Seyni Kountché, Niamey, Niger | Eswatini | 0–0 | 2019 AFCONQ | | | |
| 30 June 2017 | | Benin | 0–3 | Friendly | | | |
| 2 July 2017 | | Benin | 1–1 | Friendly | | | |
| 13 August 2017 | Stade Général-Seyni-Kountché, Niamey, Niger | Ivory Coast | 2–1 | 2018 CHANQ | Seyni 44', Garba 85' | | |
| 19 August 2017 | Stade Robert Champroux, Abidjan, Ivory Coast | Ivory Coast | 0–1 | 2018 CHANQ | | | |
| 5 September 2017 | Stade Adrar, Agadir, Morocco | Mauritania | 2–0 | Friendly | | | |
| 10 September 2017 | Cape Coast Sports Stadium, Cape Coast, Ghana | Burkina Faso | 2–1 | 2017 WAFU Nations Cup 1st round | Soumana 34', Halidou 71' | | |
| 15 September 2017 | Cape Coast Sports Stadium, Cape Coast, Ghana | Senegal | 2–1 | 2017 WAFU Nations Cup GS | Adje 29', Issoufou 88' | | |
| 17 September 2017 | Cape Coast Sports Stadium, Cape Coast, Ghana | Ivory Coast | 0–0 | 2017 WAFU Nations Cup GS | | | |
| 19 September 2017 | Nduom Sports Stadium, Elmina, Ghana | Benin | 1–2 | 2017 WAFU Nations Cup GS | Adje 4' | | |
| 21 September 2017 | Cape Coast Sports Stadium, Cape Coast, Ghana | Ghana | 0–2 | 2017 WAFU Nations Cup SF | | | |
| 24 September 2017 | Cape Coast Sports Stadium, Cape Coast, Ghana | Benin | 2–1 | 2017 WAFU Nations Cup TP | Halidou 29', Adje 85' | | |
