= 2012 Africa Cup of Nations knockout stage =

Football tournament knockout stage

The knockout stage of the 2012 Africa Cup of Nations was the second and final stage of the competition, following the group stage. It began on 4 February with the quarter-finals and ended on 12 February 2012 with the final held at the Stade d'Angondjé in Libreville. A total of 8 teams (the top two teams from each group) advanced to the knockout stage to compete in a single-elimination style tournament.

All match times are local, WAT (UTC+1).

== Format ==
In the knockout stage, except for the third place play-off, if a match was level at the end of 90 minutes of normal playing time, extra time was played (two periods of 15 minutes each). If still tied after extra time, the match was decided by a penalty shoot-out to determine the winner. In the third place play-off, if the scores remained level after 90 minutes the match would go directly to a penalty shoot-out, without any extra time being played.

== Qualified teams ==
The top two placed teams from each of the four groups qualified for the knockout stage.

Group	Winners	Runners-up
A	Zambia	Equatorial Guinea
B	Ivory Coast	Sudan
C	Gabon	Tunisia
D	Ghana	Mali

== Bracket ==
Quarter-finals
4 February – Bata
Zambia	3
Sudan	0
5 February – Franceville
Ghana (a.e.t.)	2
Tunisia	1
5 February – Libreville
Gabon	1 (4)
Mali (p)	1 (5)
4 February – Malabo
Ivory Coast	3
Equatorial Guinea	0

Semi-finals
8 February – Bata
Zambia	1
Ghana	0
8 February – Libreville
Mali	0
Ivory Coast	1

Final
12 February – Libreville
Zambia (p)	0 (8)
Ivory Coast	0 (7)
Third place play-off
11 February – Malabo
Ghana	0
Mali	2

All times are West Africa Time (UTC+1).

== Quarter-finals ==
=== Zambia vs. Sudan ===
4 February 2012
17:00

Zambia	3–0	Sudan
Sunzu 15'; C. Katongo 66'; Chamanga 86'	Report

Estadio de Bata, Bata
Attendance: 200
Referee: Bakary Gassama (Gambia)

Zambia	Sudan

GK	16	Kennedy Mweene
DF	5	Hijani Himoonde
DF	4	Joseph Musonda
DF	13	Stophira Sunzu
DF	6	Davies Nkausu
MF	8	Isaac Chansa
MF	17	Rainford Kalaba
MF	19	Nathan Sinkala	(yellow card) 45+1'
MF	3	Chisamba Lungu		(substituted off) 56'
FW	11	Christopher Katongo (c)		(substituted off) 89'
FW	20	Emmanuel Mayuka		(substituted off) 64'
Substitutions:
DF	2	Francis Kasonde		(substituted on) 56'
FW	12	James Chamanga		(substituted on) 64'
MF	21	Jonas Sakuwaha		(substituted on) 89'
Manager:
(France) Hervé Renard

GK	21	Akram Salim
DF	3	Mowaia Bashir
DF	5	Ala'a Yousif		(substituted off) 30'
DF	15	Ahmed Al-Basha	(yellow card) 37'
DF	6	Mosaab Omer
MF	19	Mohamed Bashir
MF	23	Hamid Nizar		(substituted off) 42'
MF	8	Haitham Mustafa (c)		(substituted off) 69'
FW	9	Masawi	(yellow card) 36' (yellow-red card) 65'
FW	10	Muhannad Tahir	(yellow card) 45+2'
FW	17	Mudathir El-Tahir
Substitutions:
DF	13	Amer Kamal		(substituted on) 30'
FW	7	Ramadan Agab		(substituted on) 42'
MF	12	Bader Galag		(substituted on) 69'
Manager:
Mohamed Abdallah

Assistant referees:
Jason Damoo (Seychelles)
Angesom Ogbamariam (Eritrea)
Fourth official:
Mohamed Benouza (Algeria)

=== Ivory Coast vs. Equatorial Guinea ===
4 February 2012
20:00

Ivory Coast	3–0	Equatorial Guinea
Drogba 35', 69'; Y. Touré 81'	Report

Estadio de Malabo, Malabo
Attendance: 12,500
Referee: Eddy Maillet (Seychelles)

Ivory Coast	Equatorial Guinea

GK	1	Boubacar Barry
DF	4	Kolo Touré
DF	3	Arthur Boka
DF	22	Sol Bamba
DF	5	Didier Zokora	(substituted off) 76'
MF	19	Yaya Touré
MF	14	Kafoumba Coulibaly	(substituted off) 86'
MF	6	Jean-Jacques Gosso
MF	15	Max Gradel	(substituted off) 84'
FW	11	Didier Drogba (c)
FW	10	Gervinho
Substitutions:
FW	12	Wilfried Bony	(substituted on) 76'
FW	8	Salomon Kalou	(substituted on) 84'
DF	21	Emmanuel Eboué	(substituted on) 86'
Manager:
François Zahoui

GK	1	Danilo
DF	3	Kily
DF	15	Lawrence Doe
DF	4	Rui
DF	5	Fousseny Kamissoko		(substituted off) 83'
MF	14	Ben Konaté
MF	11	Javier Balboa
MF	17	Narcisse Ekanga		(substituted off) 70'
MF	6	Juvenal (c)	(yellow card) 80'
FW	20	Daniel Ekedo		(substituted off) 46'
FW	8	Randy
Substitutions:
FW	12	Thierry Fidjeu		(substituted on) 46'
FW	10	Iván Bolado		(substituted on) 70'
FW	19	Raúl Fabiani		(substituted on) 83'
Manager:
(Brazil) Gílson Paulo

Assistant referees:
Jean-Claude Birumushahu (Burundi)
Felicien Kabanda (Rwanda)
Fourth official:
Badara Diatta (Senegal)

=== Gabon vs. Mali ===
5 February 2012
17:00

Gabon	1–1 (a.e.t.)	Mali
Mouloungui 54'	Report	Diabaté 85'
Penalties
Poko (penalty scored); Mbanangoyé (penalty scored); Mouloungui (penalty scored); Aubameyang (penalty missed); Manga (penalty scored)	4–5	(penalty scored) Diabaté; (penalty scored) Yatabaré; (penalty scored) Kanté; (penalty scored) B. Traoré; (penalty scored) Keita

Stade d'Angondjé, Libreville
Attendance: 30,000
Referee: Djamel Haimoudi (Algeria)

Gabon	Mali

GK	1	Didier Ovono
DF	5	Bruno Ecuele Manga
DF	17	Moïse Brou Apanga
DF	3	Edmond Mouele	(yellow card) 75'
DF	22	Charly Moussono
MF	18	Cédric Moubamba	(yellow card) 35'	(substituted off) 93'
MF	14	Lévy Madinda		(substituted off) 102'
MF	15	André Biyogo Poko
MF	11	Eric Mouloungui
FW	10	Daniel Cousin (c)		(substituted off) 69'
FW	9	Pierre-Emerick Aubameyang
Substitutions:
FW	20	Fabrice Do Marcolino	(yellow card) 74'	(substituted on) 69'
MF	8	Lloyd Palun		(substituted on) 93'
MF	13	Bruno Zita Mbanangoyé		(substituted on) 102'
Manager:
(Germany) Gernot Rohr

GK	16	Soumbeïla Diakité
DF	5	Cédric Kanté (c)
DF	3	Adama Tamboura
DF	4	Ousmane Berthé
DF	14	Drissa Diakité	(yellow card) 21'
MF	12	Seydou Keita
MF	7	Abdou Traoré		(substituted off) 63'
MF	15	Bakaye Traoré
MF	18	Samba Sow		(substituted off) 75'
FW	20	Samba Diakité
FW	10	Modibo Maïga	(yellow card) 85'
Substitutions:
FW	6	Mustapha Yatabaré		(substituted on) 63'
FW	9	Cheick Diabaté		(substituted on) 75'
Manager:
(France) Alain Giresse

Assistant referees:
Redouane Achik (Morocco)
Albdelhak Etchiali (Algeria)
Fourth official:
Daniel Bennett (South Africa)

=== Ghana vs. Tunisia ===
5 February 2012
20:00

Ghana	2–1 (a.e.t.)	Tunisia
John Mensah 9'; A. Ayew 100'	Report	Khelifa 41'

Stade de Franceville, Franceville
Attendance: 8,000
Referee: Néant Alioum (Cameroon)

Ghana	Tunisia

GK	16	Adam Larsen Kwarasey
DF	5	John Mensah (c)		(substituted off) 52'
DF	21	John Boye	(yellow card) 23'
DF	14	Masahudu Alhassan
DF	7	Samuel Inkoom
MF	11	Sulley Muntari		(substituted off) 64'
MF	6	Anthony Annan	(yellow card) 113'
MF	20	Kwadwo Asamoah
MF	8	Emmanuel Agyemang-Badu	(yellow card) 76'
FW	3	Asamoah Gyan		(substituted off) 99'
FW	10	André Ayew
Substitutions:
DF	15	Isaac Vorsah		(substituted on) 52'
FW	13	Jordan Ayew		(substituted on) 64'
FW	12	Prince Tagoe		(substituted on) 99'
Manager:
(Serbia) Goran Stevanović

GK	16	Aymen Mathlouthi
DF	3	Karim Haggui (c)	(yellow card) 31'
DF	20	Aymen Abdennour	(red card) 108'
DF	12	Khalil Chemmam
DF	2	Bilel Ifa		(substituted off) 81'
MF	6	Hocine Ragued
MF	14	Mejdi Traoui
MF	21	Jamel Saihi		(substituted off) 68'
MF	15	Zouheir Dhaouadi		(substituted off) 105'
FW	19	Saber Khelifa
FW	7	Youssef Msakni
Substitutions:
FW	17	Issam Jemâa		(substituted on) 68'
DF	18	Anis Boussaïdi		(substituted on) 81'
MF	10	Oussama Darragi		(substituted on) 105'
Manager:
Sami Trabelsi

Assistant referees:
Evarist Menkouande (Cameroon)
Djibril Camara (Senegal)
Fourth official:
Gehad Grisha (Egypt)

== Semi-finals ==
=== Zambia vs. Ghana ===
8 February 2012
17:00

Zambia	1–0	Ghana
Mayuka 78'	Report

Estadio de Bata, Bata
Attendance: 12,000
Referee: Mohamed Benouza (Algeria)

Zambia	Ghana

GK	16	Kennedy Mweene
RB	6	Davies Nkausu
CB	13	Stophira Sunzu	(yellow card) 52'
CB	5	Hijani Himoonde
LB	4	Joseph Musonda
CM	19	Nathan Sinkala
CM	2	Francis Kasonde	(yellow card) 10'	(substituted off) 66'
RW	17	Rainford Kalaba
LW	11	Christopher Katongo (c)
SS	8	Isaac Chansa	(yellow card) 70'
CF	12	James Chamanga		(substituted off) 46'
Substitutions:
FW	20	Emmanuel Mayuka		(substituted on) 46'
MF	3	Chisamba Lungu		(substituted on) 66'
Manager:
(France) Hervé Renard

GK	16	Adam Larsen Kwarasey
RB	7	Samuel Inkoom
CB	21	John Boye	(yellow card) 15'
CB	5	John Mensah (c)		(substituted off) 72'
LB	17	Lee Addy
CM	9	Derek Boateng	(yellow card) 63' (yellow-red card) 83'
CM	6	Anthony Annan
RW	10	André Ayew		(substituted off) 87'
LW	13	Jordan Ayew
SS	20	Kwadwo Asamoah
CF	3	Asamoah Gyan		(substituted off) 74'
Substitutions:
DF	15	Isaac Vorsah		(substituted on) 72'
FW	12	Prince Tagoe		(substituted on) 74'
MF	11	Sulley Muntari		(substituted on) 87'
Manager:
(Serbia) Goran Stevanović

Assistant referees:
Redouane Achik (Morocco)
Jean-Claude Birumushahu (Burundi)
Fourth official:
Djamel Haimoudi (Algeria)

=== Mali vs. Ivory Coast ===
8 February 2012
20:00

Mali	0–1	Ivory Coast
	Report	Gervinho 45'

Stade d'Angondjé, Libreville
Attendance: 32,000
Referee: Daniel Bennett (South Africa)

Mali	Ivory Coast

GK	16	Soumbeïla Diakité
RB	14	Drissa Diakité		(substituted off) 46'
CB	4	Ousmane Berthé	(yellow card) 6'
CB	5	Cédric Kanté (c)
LB	3	Adama Tamboura
CM	15	Bakaye Traoré
CM	20	Samba Diakité	(yellow card) 89'
RW	6	Mustapha Yatabaré		(substituted off) 73'
LW	18	Samba Sow		(substituted off) 84'
SS	12	Seydou Keita	(yellow card) 7'
CF	9	Cheick Diabaté
Substitutions:
DF	23	Ousmane Coulibaly		(substituted on) 46'
FW	11	Garra Dembélé		(substituted on) 73'
MF	17	Mahamane Traoré		(substituted on) 84'
Manager:
(France) Alain Giresse

GK	1	Boubacar Barry
RB	6	Jean-Jacques Gosso
CB	4	Kolo Touré
CB	22	Sol Bamba
LB	17	Siaka Tiéné	(yellow card) 90+3'
CM	9	Cheick Tioté	(yellow card) 83'
CM	5	Didier Zokora
AM	19	Yaya Touré		(substituted off) 90'
RF	10	Gervinho
CF	11	Didier Drogba (c)
LF	8	Salomon Kalou		(substituted off) 79'
Substitutions:
MF	18	Abdul Kader Keïta		(substituted on) 79'
MF	13	Didier Ya Konan		(substituted on) 90'
Manager:
François Zahoui

Assistant referees:
Jason Damoo (Seychelles)
Angesom Ogbamariam (Eritrea)
Fourth official:
Slim Jedidi (Tunisia)

== Third place match ==
11 February 2012
20:00

Ghana	0–2	Mali
	Report	Diabaté 23', 80'

Estadio de Malabo, Malabo
Attendance: 15,000
Referee: Gehad Grisha (Egypt)

Ghana	Mali

GK	16	Adam Larsen Kwarasey
RB	4	John Paintsil (c)
CB	19	Jonathan Mensah
CB	15	Isaac Vorsah	(yellow card) 47' (yellow-red card) 64'
LB	17	Lee Addy
CM	6	Anthony Annan
CM	23	Mohammed Abu		(substituted off) 46'
AM	20	Kwadwo Asamoah		(substituted off) 68'
RW	7	Samuel Inkoom		(substituted off) 35'
LW	10	André Ayew
CF	13	Jordan Ayew	(yellow card) 26'
Substitutions:
FW	12	Prince Tagoe		(substituted on) 35'
MF	11	Sulley Muntari		(substituted on) 46'
DF	14	Masahudu Alhassan		(substituted on) 68'
Manager:
(Serbia) Goran Stevanović

GK	1	Oumar Sissoko
RB	23	Ousmane Coulibaly
CB	2	Abdoulaye Maïga
CB	5	Cédric Kanté (c)
LB	3	Adama Tamboura
DM	15	Bakaye Traoré	(yellow card) 56'
CM	20	Samba Diakité
CM	12	Seydou Keita
RW	11	Garra Dembélé		(substituted off) 86'
LW	18	Samba Sow	(yellow card) 42'	(substituted off) 86'
CF	9	Cheick Diabaté
Substitutions:
MF	8	Souleymane Keita		(substituted on) 86'
FW	6	Mustapha Yatabaré		(substituted on) 86'
Manager:
(France) Alain Giresse

Man of the Match:
Cheick Diabaté (Mali)

Assistant referees:
Peter Edibe (Nigeria)
Moffat Champiti (Malawi)
Fourth official:
Bakary Gassama (Gambia)

== Final ==
12 February 2012
20:30 (Note: Original kick-off at 20:00 but CAF announced on 9 February 2012 that the final would be delayed by half an hour due to "technical and logistical reasons".)

Zambia	0–0 (a.e.t.)	Ivory Coast
	Report
Penalties
C. Katongo (penalty scored); Mayuka (penalty scored); Chansa (penalty scored); F. Katongo (penalty scored); Mweene (penalty scored); Sinkala (penalty scored); Lungu (penalty scored); Kalaba (penalty missed); Sunzu (penalty scored)	8–7	(penalty scored) Tioté; (penalty scored) Bony; (penalty scored) Bamba; (penalty scored) Gradel; (penalty scored) Drogba; (penalty scored) Tiéné; (penalty scored) Ya Konan; (penalty missed) K. Touré; (penalty missed) Gervinho

Stade d'Angondjé, Libreville
Attendance: 32,000
Referee: Badara Diatta (Senegal)

Zambia	Ivory Coast

GK	16	Kennedy Mweene
RB	6	Davies Nkausu
CB	13	Stophira Sunzu
CB	5	Hijani Himoonde
LB	4	Joseph Musonda		(substituted off) 12'
RM	3	Chisamba Lungu
CM	8	Isaac Chansa
CM	19	Nathan Sinkala
LM	17	Rainford Kalaba
CF	11	Christopher Katongo (c)
CF	20	Emmanuel Mayuka
Substitutions:
DF	23	Nyambe Mulenga	(yellow card) 69'	(substituted on) 12'	(substituted off) 74'
MF	10	Felix Katongo			(substituted on) 74'
Manager:
(France) Hervé Renard

GK	1	Boubacar Barry
RB	6	Jean-Jacques Gosso
CB	4	Kolo Touré
CB	22	Sol Bamba	(yellow card) 66'
LB	17	Siaka Tiéné
RM	5	Didier Zokora		(substituted off) 75'
CM	19	Yaya Touré		(substituted off) 87'
LM	9	Cheick Tioté	(yellow card) 63'
AM	10	Gervinho
AM	8	Salomon Kalou		(substituted off) 63'
CF	11	Didier Drogba (c)
Substitutions:
MF	15	Max Gradel		(substituted on) 63'
MF	13	Didier Ya Konan		(substituted on) 75'
FW	12	Wilfried Bony		(substituted on) 87'
Manager:
François Zahoui

Assistant referees:
Bechir Hassani (Tunisia)
Evarist Menkouande (Cameroon)
Fourth official:
Eddy Maillet (Seychelles)
