= Niger at the Africa Cup of Nations =

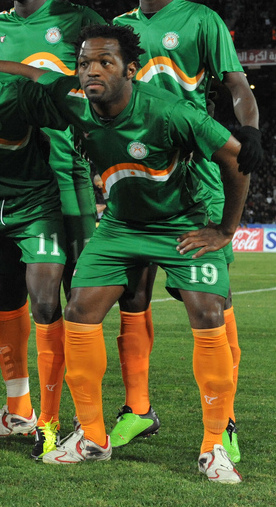
William N'Gounou, scored Niger's only goal in the Africa Cup of Nations.

Niger has participated in two Africa Cup of Nations, the 2012 and 2013 editions. Historically, Niger has been considered a much weaker side in the strong West African Football Union, and didn't have much success in major tournament's qualification. Until 2010s, Niger had never qualified for any AFCON editions. However, Niger produced a stunning qualifying run in 2012 Africa Cup of Nations qualification, overcame giants like Egypt and South Africa to book its final debut, where they lost all three matches. Niger once again participated a year in later in the same edition, obtained one point though unable to prevent early elimination. Since then, Niger haven't qualified for the tournament.

== Overall record ==
Africa Cup of Nations record
Year	Round	Position	Pld	W	D	L	GF	GA
(Sudan) 1957 – (United Arab Republic) 1959	Part of France							
(Ethiopia) 1962 – (Tunisia) 1965	Not affiliated to CAF							
(Ethiopia) 1968	Did not enter							
(Sudan) 1970 – (Cameroon) 1972	Did not qualify							
(Egypt) 1974	Withdrew							
(Ethiopia) 1976	Did not qualify							
(Ghana) 1978 – (Nigeria) 1980	Withdrew							
(Libya) 1982	Did not enter							
(Ivory Coast) 1984	Did not qualify							
(Egypt) 1986 – (Algeria) 1990	Did not enter							
(Senegal) 1992 – (Tunisia) 1994	Did not qualify							
(South Africa) 1996	Withdrew during qualifying							
(Burkina Faso) 1998	Disqualified for withdrawing in 1996							
(Ghana) (Nigeria) 2000 – (Angola) 2010	Did not qualify							
(Equatorial Guinea) (Gabon) 2012	Group stage	15th	3	0	0	3	1	5
(South Africa) 2013	Group stage	15th	3	0	1	2	0	4
(Equatorial Guinea) 2015 – (Morocco) 2025	Did not qualify							
(Kenya) (Tanzania) (Uganda) 2027	To be determined							
2029	To be determined							
Total	Group stage	2/35	6	0	1	5	1	9

== By match ==
Part	Year	No.	Stage	Date	Opponent	Result	Niger scorers
1	(Equatorial Guinea) (Gabon) 2012	1	Group stage	23 January 2012	Gabon	0–2	—
1	(Equatorial Guinea) (Gabon) 2012	2	Group stage	27 January 2012	Tunisia	1–2	N'Gounou 9'
1	(Equatorial Guinea) (Gabon) 2012	3	Group stage	31 January 2012	Morocco	0–1	—
2	(South Africa) 2013	4	Group stage	20 January 2013	Mali	0–1	—
2	(South Africa) 2013	5	Group stage	24 January 2013	DR Congo	0–0	—
2	(South Africa) 2013	6	Group stage	28 January 2013	Ghana	0–3	—

== Tournaments ==
=== 2012 Africa Cup of Nations ===
==== Group stage ====
Pos	Team	Pld	W	D	L	GF	GA	GD	Pts	Qualification
1	Gabon (H)	3	3	0	0	6	2	+4	9	Advance to knockout stage
2	Tunisia	3	2	0	1	4	3	+1	6	Advance to knockout stage
3	Morocco	3	1	0	2	4	5	−1	3	
4	Niger	3	0	0	3	1	5	−4	0	

Source: CAF
(H) Hosts
23 January 2012
17:00

Gabon	2–0	Niger
Aubameyang 31'; N'Guéma 42'	Report

Stade d'Angondjé, Libreville
Attendance: 38,000
Referee: Eddy Maillet (Seychelles)

27 January 2012
17:00

Niger	1–2	Tunisia
N'Gounou 9'	Report	Msakni 4'; Jemâa 89'

Stade d'Angondjé, Libreville
Attendance: 20,000
Referee: Janny Sikazwe (Zambia)

31 January 2012
19:00

Niger	0–1	Morocco
	Report	Belhanda 78'

Stade d'Angondjé, Libreville
Attendance: 4,000
Referee: Hamada Nampiandraza (Madagascar)

=== 2013 Africa Cup of Nations ===
==== Group stage ====
Pos	Team	Pld	W	D	L	GF	GA	GD	Pts	Qualification
1	Ghana	3	2	1	0	6	2	+4	7	Advance to knockout stage
2	Mali	3	1	1	1	2	2	0	4	Advance to knockout stage
3	DR Congo	3	0	3	0	3	3	0	3	
4	Niger	3	0	1	2	0	4	−4	1	

Source: CAF
20 January 2013
20:00

Mali	1–0	Niger
Keita 84'	Report

Nelson Mandela Bay Stadium, Port Elizabeth
Attendance: 20,000
Referee: Slim Jedidi (Tunisia)

24 January 2013
20:00

Niger	0–0	DR Congo
	Report

Nelson Mandela Bay Stadium, Port Elizabeth
Attendance: 12,000
Referee: Bouchaïb El Ahrach (Morocco)

28 January 2013
19:00

Niger	0–3	Ghana
	Report	Gyan 6'; Atsu 23'; Boye 49'

Nelson Mandela Bay Stadium, Port Elizabeth
Attendance: 10,000
Referee: Badara Diatta (Senegal)

== Goalscorers ==
Rank	Player	2012	2013	Goals
1	William N'Gounou	1		1
	Total	1		1
