= Harouna Doula Gabde =

Nigerien footballer and manager

Harouna Doula
Personal information
- Full name: Doula Gabde Harouna
- Date of birth: 10 January 1966 (age 60)
- Place of birth: Niamey, Niger

International career
Years	Team	Apps	(Gls)
2009–2012	Niger		

Doula Gabde Harouna, better known as Harouna Doula is a Nigerien football manager and former player. He was Manager of the Niger national football team from 2009 to 2012, leading Niger to its first African Nations Cup qualification in 2012, their first African Nations Championship qualification in 2011, and the winning of the UEMOA Tournament in 2010. He was demoted following the first match loss at the 2012 Nations Cup finals.

== Background ==
Aged 46 in January 2012, Harouna Doula was a Nigerien international, playing at fullback. After retirement he received a "professorat" degree in physical education and sport from Niger's National Institute of Youth, Sports, and Culture (INJS/C). He holds an "A License" for professional football training from the University of Leipzig, a "C License" from the Confederation of African Football, and instructorship diplomas for CAF, UEFA, and FIFA.

== Manager of Niger ==
Appointed manager of the Nigerien men's national squad in 2009, Harouna Doula replaced former U-17 Niger coach Frederic Costa, appointed in December 2008. Under Harouna Doula Niger finished a poor run, ending in failure to qualify for the 2010 African Cup of Nations in Angola.

Despite a failed run for ACON2010, Niger hosted and won the UEMOA Tournament in November 2010, and followed up with their first ever qualification for the African Nations Championship in February 2011. Niger progressed to their first ever quarter-final appearance, ending in a loss to the hosts,

On 10 October 2010, Niger earned a shock 1-0 win over Egypt at home in the 2012 African Cup of Nations qualification. After home wins—but away losses—over South Africa and Sierra Leone, on 8 October 2011 Niger qualified for the Africa Cup of Nations for the first time in its history.

For his part in Niger's unprecedented run, Harouna Doula was awarded "Best African Manager 2011" by CAF in December 2012. In the runup to ACON 2012. reporters and political leaders commented on his quiet, collaborative management style. In one interview he said that "out objective is to always remain humble... but also to surpass ourselves, to surprise, as we were able to do during the qualification phase."

On 13 November, two days prior to Niger's last preparative friendly (against Botswana in Niamey) FENIFOOT announced it had recruited two "technicians" to aid Harouna Doula in the African Nations Cup. Bako Adamou was to be assistant trainer and the French manager Rolland Courbis was named "Technical counselor" to the team. Colonel Djibrilla Hima, president of FENIFOOT, stressed in a press conference that "It was not a question of the national team manager leaving the national team. He qualified us for CAN (ACON), he will take us to the final of the African Cup of Nations."

On 6 January, Harouna Doula, along with team captain Lawali Idrissa, announced the selection of the 26 players who would attend the pre-tournament camp in Douala, Cameroon.

Two days after the 2-0 to Gabon in Niger's first match of the tourney on 23 January, Harouna Doula was removed as manager Colonel Djibrilla Hima on 25 January announced Harouna Doula would be demoted to "Second trainer" until the end of the 2012 African Cup of Nations, and was being replaced as head coach by Rolland Courbis. FENIFOOT blamed Harouna Doula's reported last minute changes to the starting lineup of the side that lost Gabon. It was unclear at the time if Harouna Doula would return after the tournament.

Despite the changes, Harouna Doula affirmed to the press in Libreville prior to their Tunisia match that there was no rivalry between him and Courbis. Continuing to work as a trainer and appear on the bench with the squad, Harouna Doula said on 27 January that "We cooperate, we work together for the good of the team."

== See also ==
- 2012 Africa Cup of Nations Group C
- 2012 Africa Cup of Nations qualification
