= Cheick Diabaté =

Cheick Diabaté may refer to:

- Cheick Diabaté (footballer, born 1988), Malian football forward
- Cheick Diabate (footballer, born 2002), English football defender for St Johnstone
- Cheick Mamadou Diabaté (born 2004), Ivorian football centre-back for Wolfsberg
- Cheick Hamala Diabaté, Malian musician
- Cheick Omar Diabate, Nigerian football manager
