= Hamidou Djibo =

Nigerien football striker

Personal information
- Date of birth: March 8, 1985 (age 41)
- Place of birth: Niamey, Niger
- Position: Striker

Senior career*
Years	Team	Apps	(Gls)
2005–2007	AS-FNIS	?	(?)
2007	RC Kadiogo	?	(?)
2007–2008	ES Sétif	0	(0)
2010	Akokana		
2010–2016	AS GNN		

International career
2002–2008	Niger	8	(2)
- * Club domestic league appearances and goals

Hamidou Djibo (born March 8, 1985, in Niger) is a Nigerien football striker. He currently plays for AS GNN in the Niger Premier League.

Djibo was the member of the Niger national football team, and was part of the squad during the World Cup qualifiers.

== Career ==
He previously played for ES Sétif from Algeria and the RC Kadiogo from Burkina Faso. He won national championship in 2011 with his club AS GNN.

== International career ==
He was a member of the Niger national football team.
