= Sulliman Mazadou =

Nigerien footballer (born 1985)

Sulliman Johan Mazadou (born 11 April 1985) is a Nigerien footballer who plays for French club US Marignane in Championnat de France amateur. He is a member of Niger national football team.
