= Cheick Omar Diabate =

Nigerien football manager

Personal information
- Place of birth: Niger

Managerial career
- Years: Team
- 2014–2015: Niger

Cheick Omar Diabate is a Nigerien football manager.

== Niger ==
Taking over from Gernot Rohr as Niger coach in 2014, Diabate guided the Menas to a 3-1 defeat to Cape Verde and a 1-1 draw with Mozambique, ultimately failing to qualify for the 2015 Africa Cup of Nations.

Before this, he was the assistant coach of the national team but was given the task of finishing the qualifying campaign following Rohr's departure. He has also expostulated with the Togolese Football Federation's decision to suspend the domestic league and has adjured them to resume it.
