= Jimmy Bulus =

Nigerien footballer

Personal information
- Full name: Jimmy Al-Kaidji Bulus
- Date of birth: 22 October 1986 (age 40)
- Place of birth: Kaduna, Nigeria
- Position: Midfielder

Senior career*
Years	Team	Apps	(Gls)
2003–2004	JS du Ténéré		
2004–2007	ASFA Yennenga		
2007–2009	NA Hussein Dey		
2009–2011	ASFAN		
2011	NA Hussein Dey	3	(0)
2011–2014	ASFA Yennenga		
2014	Dhofar Club		
2014–2015	US GN		

International career
2003–2012	Niger	8	(0)
- * Club domestic league appearances and goals

Jimmy Bulus (born October 22, 1986) is a professional footballer. Born in Nigeria, he played for the Niger national team.

== Career ==
Bulus was born in Kaduna, Nigeria. He started his career in JS du Ténéré in Niger and went on to ASFA Yennenga in the Burkinabé Premier League.

== International career ==
Bulus was a member of Niger national team, for which he played from 2003. He played in the 2012 African Nations Cup, mostly on right back position.
