= Kourouma Fatoukouma =

Footballer (born 1986)

Personal information
- Date of birth: 7 November 1986 (age 40)
- Place of birth: Saint-Étienne, France
- Height: 1.79 m (5 ft 10 in)
- Position: Left back

Youth career
- 1998–2003: Saint-Étienne

Senior career*
Years	Team	Apps	(Gls)
2003–2009	Saint-Étienne	0	(0)
2009–2015	CR Al Hoceima	105	(2)
2016–2018	MuSa	59	(2)
2019	FC Jazz	10	(1)
Total		174	(5)

International career
2012–2019	Niger	32	(1)
- * Club domestic league appearances and goals

Kourouma Fatoukouma (born 7 November 1986) is a former professional footballer who played as a left-back. Born in France, he played for the Niger national team at international level.

== Club career ==
Fatoukouma joined FC Jazz of the Finnish third-tier Kakkonen in April 2019 after a three-year spell with Musan Salama, another Pori based side.

== Career statistics ==
Scores and results list Niger's goal tally first, score column indicates score after each Fatoukouma goal.

List of international goals scored by Kourouma Fatoukouma
No.	Date	Venue	Opponent	Score	Result	Competition
1	15 November 2013	Stade Olympique de Sousse, Sousse, Tunisia	Libya	1–0	1–1	Friendly
