= Charly Moussono =

Gabon international footballer (born 1984)

Personal information
- Full name: Charly Moussono Moussono
- Date of birth: 15 November 1984 (age 41)
- Height: 1.66 m (5 ft 5 in)
- Position: Left-back

Senior career*
Years	Team	Apps	(Gls)
2005	Franceville F.C.		
2006–2009	Delta Téléstar Libreville		
2009–2012	Missile FC		
2012–2014	University of Pretoria F.C.		
2014–2016	Missile FC		
2012–2014	AS Stade Mandji		
2012–2014	Oyem AC		

International career
2006	Cameroon (beach soccer)	3	(0)
2011–2012	Gabon	10	(0)
- * Club domestic league appearances and goals

Charly Moussono (born 15 November 1984) is a professional footballer who played as a left-back. Cameroonian by birth, he represented Gabon and Cameroon at international level. After he represented Gabon at the Africa Cup of Nations in 2012, FIFA later found him to be ineligible to represent Gabon at international level.

In 2011, Moussono played several games for Gabon and was also included in a high-profile friendly game against Brazil. He was later named in the Gabon squad for the 2012 Africa Cup of Nations. He played in all four games that Gabon participated in.

On 3 June 2012, he represented Gabon in a 0–0 draw with Niger in a FIFA sanctioned World Cup qualifying match. In December 2012, FIFA announced that Moussono was not an eligible player for Gabon as he had represented Cameroon in the 2006 FIFA Beach Soccer World Cup competition. Niger were awarded a 3–0 victory over Gabon.
