= Saber Khalifa =

Tunisian footballer

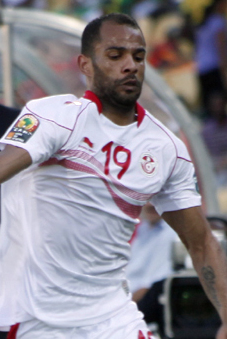
- Khalifa playing for Tunisia at the 2013 Africa Cup of Nations

Personal information
- Date of birth: 14 October 1986 (age 40)
- Place of birth: Gabès, Tunisia
- Height: 1.85 m (6 ft 1 in)
- Position: Forward

Senior career*
Years	Team	Apps	(Gls)
2005–2006	Stade Gabèsien	29	(15)
2006–2008	Espérance	22	(1)
2008–2010	Hammam-Lif	32	(20)
2010–2011	Espérance	12	(1)
2011	Ahli Benghazi	4	(3)
2011–2013	Evian Thonon Gaillard	56	(17)
2013–2016	Marseille	28	(1)
2014–2016	→ Club Africain (loan)	44	(19)
2016–2019	Club Africain	20	(6)
2018	→ Kuwait SC (loan)	0	(0)
2019	Emirates	9	(3)
2019–2023	Club Africain	53	(11)
Total		309	(97)

International career
2010–2018	Tunisia	46	(7)
- * Club domestic league appearances and goals

Saber Khalifa (Arabic: صابر خليفة; born 14 October 1986) is a Tunisian former professional footballer who played as a winger and forward.

== Club career ==
Born in Gabès, Khalifa has played in Tunisia, Libya and France for Stade Gabèsien, Espérance, Hammam-Lif, Al-Ahly.

He joined French club Evian Thonon Gaillard in 2011, and in 2013 he was a finalist in the Coupe de France when his side lost 3–2 to Bordeaux.

On 7 August 2013, Khalifa was linked with a move to Marseille, and he signed a four-year contract two days later. He stayed one season, playing 28 league matches and scoring once.

On 26 July 2014, Khalifa was loaned to Club Africain with an option to buy included in the deal.

In June 2016 Kalifa was linked with a move to Qatar to play for Al-Shahania Sports Club but this move eventually fell through. He spent time on loan with Kuwait SC in 2018.

On 14 January 2019, Emirates Club has signed Khalfia for one seasons from Club Africain.

== International career ==
Khalifa made his senior international debut for Tunisia in 2010 against Botswana and appeared in FIFA World Cup qualifying matches.

He was a member of Tunisia's squad at both the 2012 and 2013 Africa Cup of Nations tournaments.

Khalifa was recalled to the national team squad in October 2013, having been suspended for the previous month.

In December 2014 he was named as part of Tunisia's provisional squad for the 2015 African Cup of Nations.

He was named in Tunisia's final 23-man squad for the 2018 FIFA World Cup in Russia.

== Personal life ==
Upon signing with Marseille in August 2013, Khalifa's name was accidentally rendered as "Khlifa". In a video for Marseille's WebTV, he attributed this spelling mistake to the misconceived pronunciation of his name when he arrived in France.

== Career statistics ==
Appearances and goals by national team and year
National team	Year	Apps	Goals
Tunisia	2010	1	0
Tunisia	2011	2	1
Tunisia	2012	11	3
Tunisia	2013	9	1
Tunisia	2014	4	0
Tunisia	2015	8	1
Tunisia	2016	1	1
Tunisia	2017	3	0
Tunisia	2018	4	0
Total		43	7

Scores and results list Tunisia's goal tally first, score column indicates score after each Khalifa goal.

List of international goals scored by Saber Khalifa
No.	Date	Venue	Opponent	Score	Result	Competition
1	8 October 2011	Stade Olympique de Radès, Radès, Tunisia	Togo	2–0	2–0	2012 Africa Cup of Nations qualification
2	9 January 2012	Zayed Sports City Stadium, Abu Dhabi, United Arab Emirates	Sudan	1–0	3–0	Friendly
3	5 February 2012	Stade de Franceville, Franceville, Gabon	Ghana	1–1	1–2 (a.e.t)	2012 Africa Cup of Nations
4	9 June 2012	Estádio da Várzea, Praia, Cape Verde	Cape Verde	1–0	2–1	2014 FIFA World Cup qualification
5	10 January 2013	Saoud bin Abdulrahman Stadium, Al Wakrah, Qatar	Gabon	1–0	1–1	Friendly
6	12 June 2015	Stade Olympique de Radès, Radès, Tunisia	Djibouti	5–1	8–1	2017 Africa Cup of Nations qualification
7	4 September 2016	Stade Mustapha Ben Jannet, Monastir, Tunisia	Liberia	3–1	4–1	2017 Africa Cup of Nations qualification
