= Rémy Ebanega =

Gabonese footballer

Personal information
- Full name: Rémy Nenet Ebanega Ekwa
- Date of birth: 17 November 1989 (age 36)
- Place of birth: Bitam, Gabon
- Position: Defender

Senior career*
| Years | Team | Apps | (Gls) |
| 2009–2012 | Bitam | | |
| 2012–2014 | Auxerre | 12 | (0) |
| 2014–2016 | CA Bastia | 4 | (0) |

International career
| 2011–2012 | Gabon | 13 | (1) |
- * Club domestic league appearances and goals

Rémy Nenet Ebanega Ekwa (born 17 November 1989) is a Gabonese former professional footballer who played as a defender.

== Club career ==
Ebanega was born in Bitam, Gabon,

In April 2015, he sustained a severe knee injury. By February 2017, he had been out of action for almost two years.

== International career ==
Ebanega was called up to Gabon national team and played at the 2012 Africa Cup of Nations and the 2012 Summer Olympics.

== President of the ANFPG ==
Ebanega is the President of the ANFPG (Association Syndicales des Footballers Professionels du Gabon), a trade union in Gabon.
