= Idrissa Laouali =

Nigerien footballer

Personal information
- Date of birth: September 11, 1979 (age 47)
- Place of birth: Ojia, Maradi, Niger
- Height: 1.80 m (5 ft 11 in)
- Position: Central midfielder

Team information
- Current team: Mangasport

Senior career*
Years	Team	Apps	(Gls)
2002–2004	AS-FNIS		
2004–2005	Sahel SC		
2005–2007	Rail Club du Kadiogo		
2007–2011	ASFA Yennenga		
2011–2013	AS FAN		
2013–2014	Mangasport		
2014–2015	Sahel		

International career
2002–2012	Niger	31	(0)
- * Club domestic league appearances and goals as of January 27, 2007

Idrissa Laouali (born September 11, 1979, in Niger) is a Nigerien football midfielder. His nickname is Pele.

== Career ==
He previously played for Burkinabe club Rail Club du Kadiogo and AS-FNIS from Niger. He played with AS-FNIS on African Club Competitions 2003.

== International career ==
Idrissa is a member and captain of the Niger national football team.
