= Mohamed Soumaïla =

Nigerien footballer

Personal information
- Date of birth: 30 October 1994 (age 32)
- Place of birth: Niamey, Niger
- Height: 1.78 m (5 ft 10 in)
- Position: Full-back

Team information
- Current team: Bulgnéville Contrex Vittel

Youth career
- Olympic Niamey

Senior career*
Years	Team	Apps	(Gls)
2011–2013	Olympic Niamey		
2013–2014	Sfaxien		
2014–2017	Noisy-le-Sec		
2017–2019	Raon-l'Étape		
2019–	Bulgnéville Contrex Vittel		

International career^{‡}
2012–	Niger	35	(0)
- * Club domestic league appearances and goals ‡ National team caps and goals as of 18:26, 23 June 2021 (UTC)

Mohamed Soumaïla (born 30 October 1994) is a Nigerien professional footballer who plays as a full-back for Régional 3 club Bulgnéville Contrex Vittel and the Niger national team. He was part of the Niger squads that played at the 2012 and 2013 Africa Cup of Nations. He was born in Niamey, Niger, and plays Left-Back as of 2025.

== Honours ==
Olympic Niamey

- Niger Premier League: 2011–12
