= Amer Kamal =

Sudanese footballer

Amer Kamal or Amer Kamal Suliman (born 13 September 1987 in Sudan) is a Sudanese footballer who plays for Al-Merreikh SC in the Sudanese Premier League.

He is a member of Sudan national football team, played at 2012 Africa Cup of Nations. He plays as a midfielder for his team.
