= François Zahoui =

Ivorian football manager (born 1961)

Personal information
- Date of birth: 21 July 1961 (age 65)
- Place of birth: Treichville, Ivory Coast
- Position: Midfielder

Senior career*
Years	Team	Apps	(Gls)
1981–1983	Ascoli	11	(0)
1983–1987	Nancy	112	(8)
1987–1992	Toulon	109	(5)
1992–1994	JGA Nevers		
Total		232	(13)

International career
1984–1988	Ivory Coast	4	(0)

Managerial career
- 1999–2001: Toulon
- 2005–2006: Africa Sports
- 2010–2012: Ivory Coast
- 2015–2019: Niger
- 2019–2021: Central African Republic
Medal record
Men's football
Representing Ivory Coast (as manager)
Africa Cup of Nations
Runner-up	2012
- * Club domestic league appearances and goals

François Zahoui (born 21 July 1961) is an Ivorian football manager and former player who most recently managed the Central African Republic national team. He was the first African footballer to play in Serie A.

== Coaching career ==
In 2010, Zahoui was chosen to succeed Sven-Goran Eriksson as head coach of the full Ivory Coast national team.

In 2015, he was appointed as the head coach of Niger, leaving in September 2019.

A week later he became manager of Central African Republic.
