= Éric Mouloungui =

Gabonese footballer (born 1984)

Personal information
- Date of birth: 1 April 1984 (age 42)
- Place of birth: Port-Gentil, Gabon
- Height: 1.86 m (6 ft 1 in)
- Position: Winger

Senior career*
Years	Team	Apps	(Gls)
2000–2002	AS Mangasport	37	(35)
2002–2003	Vauban Strasbourg	2	(2)
2003–2007	Strasbourg	101	(17)
2006	→ Gueugnon (loan)	8	(0)
2008–2012	Nice	106	(18)
2012–2013	Al-Wahda	1	(0)
2013	→ Śląsk Wrocław (loan)	10	(1)
2014–2015	Shenyang Zhongze	15	(2)
2015–2017	CF Mounana		
2017	AS Béziers	8	(0)
2017–2019	JS Saint-Jean Beaulieu	22	(4)

International career
2005–2013	Gabon	39	(7)
- * Club domestic league appearances and goals

Éric Mouloungui (born 1 April 1984) is a Gabonese former professional footballer who played as a winger. He spent most of his career in France while representing the Gabon national team at international level.

== Club career ==
Mouloungui was born in Port-Gentil, Gabon. He began his career in his native Gabon at Mangasport Moanda, before moving to CFA 2 side Vauban Strasbourg, France in 2002. Here he spent a year before signing for RC Strasbourg, then of the French top flight.

For the first half of the 2005–06 season Mouloungui gained first-team experience on loan to FC Gueugnon in Ligue 2 before returning to his Alsace based parent club in January 2006. Here he made two first team appearances, not scoring, as Strasbourg were relegated to Ligue 2.

In the 2006–07 season he was top goal scorer for his side with 11 goals from 30 games, helping the club make a swift return to the French top flight, after just one season spent in the second tier. He became first choice forward for his club, starting Strasbourg's first Ligue 1 game in the 2007–08 season alongside on-loan FC Porto striker Wason Rentería against French giants Marseille with the game ending in a 0–0 draw.

In 2008, he joined Côte d'Azur based side OGC Nice, taking the number 11 shirt.

On 17 July 2014, Mouloungui transferred to China League One side Shenyang Zhongze.

== International career ==
In the 2012 Africa Cup of Nations he scored a goal in the quarterfinals, but it did not help the team further, as they lost on penalties. But it is still the best result in history Gabon.
