= Moussa Maâzou =

Nigerien footballer

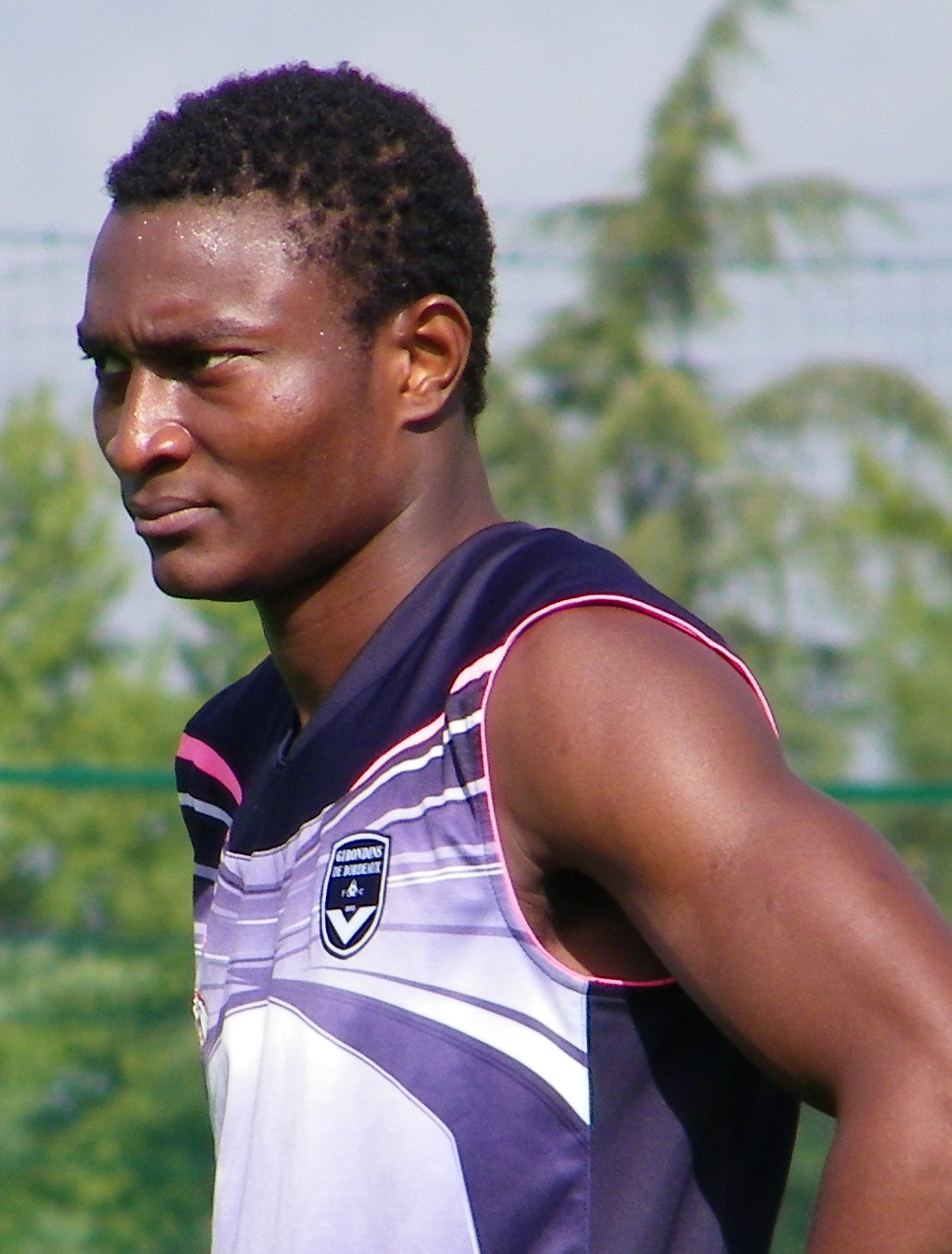
- Maâzou training with Bordeaux in 2010

Personal information
- Full name: Ouwo Moussa Maâzou
- Date of birth: 25 August 1988 (age 38)
- Place of birth: Niamey, Niger
- Height: 1.86 m (6 ft 1 in)
- Position: Striker

Youth career
- 1998–2005: ASFAN

Senior career*
Years	Team	Apps	(Gls)
2005–2008	ASFAN	79	(48)
2008–2009	Lokeren	31	(15)
2009–2012	CSKA Moscow	15	(3)
2010	→ Monaco (loan)	18	(5)
2010–2011	→ Bordeaux (loan)	15	(1)
2011	→ Monaco (loan)	1	(0)
2011–2012	→ Zulte Waregem (loan)	4	(0)
2012	→ Le Mans (loan)	15	(2)
2012–2013	Étoile du Sahel	12	(3)
2013–2014	Vitória Guimarães	25	(4)
2014–2015	Marítimo	18	(9)
2015	Changchun Yatai	26	(6)
2016	Randers	10	(1)
2016–2017	Ajaccio	40	(8)
2017–2018	Lens	11	(1)
2018	→ Ajaccio (loan)	15	(1)
2019	Ohod	4	(1)
2019–2020	Sektzia Ness Ziona	25	(4)
2021–2022	Jeunesse Esch	45	(18)
2022	Differdange 03	0	(0)
2022–2023	FC Bassin Piennois		
2023–2024	The Belval Belvaux	12	(5)

International career
2008–2021	Niger	54	(13)
- * Club domestic league appearances and goals

Ouwo Moussa Maâzou (born 25 August 1988) commonly known as Moussa Maâzou, is a Nigerien former professional footballer who played as a striker.

== Club career ==
Maazou began his senior career as a player with Niger's Army club, ASFAN of Niamey. In 2005–2006 Maazou scored 17 goals. In the 2006–2007 season with ASFAN, he scored 20 goals in 34 matches. In January 2008, Belgian side Sporting Lokeren signed him. He scored six goals in his first nine matches. On 3 January 2009, Maâzou signed a contract with CSKA Moscow. The club paid Sporting Lokeren €4.8 million for Maâzou. He was immediately loaned back to Lokeren until 1 July 2009. After CSKA qualified for the round of 16 of the UEFA Cup 2008–09, he was called back from the loan and on 12 March 2009 was registered as a CSKA player. In January 2010 Maâzou left Russia, signing a six-month loan deal, with an option for a permanent move when his loan spell ends, with AS Monaco. The following season Maâzou joined FC Girondins de Bordeaux on a one-year loan, again with an option to purchase. At the end of January 2011 Maâzou returned to AS Monaco on another six-month, but after only one game injured his knee in training and would require surgery.

In February 2012, Maâzou signed for Le Mans on a six-month loan deal, before moving to Tunisian side Étoile du Sahel on a three-year contract during the summer of 2012. After terminating his contract with Tunisian side Étoile du Sahel, Maâzou signed for Vitória Guimarães in Portugal in July 2013.

He switched to another Portuguese club, Marítimo in August 2014. On 28 January 2015, at that point the Portuguese top flight's second top goalscorer of the season with nine goals, Maâzou transferred to Chinese Super League side Changchun Yatai.

In February 2016, Maâzou moved to Danish side Randers.

In July 2016, AC Ajaccio announced the signing of Maâzou on a one-year deal, with an option of a further year.

A year later, on 31 August 2017, Maâzou signed for RC Lens on a three-year contract. In December 2018, he agreed a mutual termination of his contract with RC Lens.

On 23 September 2019 signed the Israeli Premier League club Sektzia Ness Ziona.

== International career ==
In April 2015, Maâzou announced his retirement from the Niger national football team at the age of 26, after having earned 30 caps and scored seven international goals. He credited the dismissal of manager Gernot Rohr in the previous October as a reason for his decision.

However, in October he returned to the national team, scoring two goals against Somalia national football team in the campaign for 2018 World Cup.

== Career statistics ==
=== Club ===
As of match played 31 May 2024

Appearances and goals by club, season and competition
Club	Season	League			National Cup		League Cup		Continental		Other		Total	
Club	Season	Division	Apps	Goals	Apps	Goals	Apps	Goals	Apps	Goals	Apps	Goals	Apps	Goals
ASFAN	2005	Niger Ligue 1	30	17	—		—		—		—		30	17
ASFAN	2006	Niger Ligue 1	34	20	—		—		–		–		34	20
ASFAN	2007	Niger Ligue 1	15	11	—		—		–		–		15	11
ASFAN	Total		79	48	—		—		—		—		79	48
Lokeren	2007–08	Belgian First Division	8	1	—		—		—		—		8	1
Lokeren	2008–09	Belgian First Division	23	14	1	0	—		—		—		24	14
Lokeren	Total		31	15	1	0	—		—		—		32	15
CSKA Moscow	2009	Russian Premier League	15	3	4	0	—		0	0	—		19	3
Monaco (loan)	2009–10	Ligue 1	18	5	4	3	—		—		—		22	8
Bordeaux (loan)	2010–11	Ligue 1	15	1	0	0	1	0	—		—		16	1
Monaco (loan)	2010–11	Ligue 1	1	0	—		—		—		—		1	0
Zulte Waregem (loan)	2011–12	Belgian Pro League	4	0	1	0	—		—		—		5	0
Le Mans (loan)	2011–12	Ligue 2	15	2	—		—		—		—		15	2
Étoile du Sahel	2011–12	Tunisian Ligue Professionnelle 1	2	0	0	0	—		—		—		2	0
Étoile du Sahel	2012–13	Tunisian Ligue Professionnelle 1	10	3	0	0	—		3	0	—		13	3
Étoile du Sahel	Total		12	3	0	0	—		3	0	—		15	3
Vitória Guimarães	2013–14	Primeira Liga	25	4	1	0	1	0	5	2	1	0	33	6
Marítimo	2014–15	Primeira Liga	18	9	2	1	3	1	—		—		23	11
Changchun Yatai	2015	Chinese Super League	26	6	0	0	—		—		—		26	6
Randers	2015–16	Danish Superliga	10	1	2	0	—		—		—		12	1
Ajaccio	2016–17	Ligue 2	35	7	3	2	1	0	—		—		39	9
Ajaccio	2017–18	Ligue 2	5	1	—		1	0	—		—		6	1
Ajaccio	Total		40	8	3	2	2	0	—		—		45	10
Lens	2017–18	Ligue 2	11	1	0	0	—		—		—		11	1
Ajaccio (loan)	2017–18	Ligue 2	15	1	—		—		—		3	0	18	1
Ohod	2018–19	Saudi Professional League	4	1	—		—		—		—		4	1
Sektzia Ness Ziona	2019–20	Israeli Premier League	25	4	1	0	—		—		—		26	4
Jeunesse Esch	2020–21	Luxembourg National Division	20	9	0	0	—		—		—		20	9
Jeunesse Esch	2021–22	Luxembourg National Division	26	10	0	0	—		—		—		26	10
Jeunesse Esch	Total		46	19	0	0	—		—		—		46	19
Differdange 03	2022–23	Luxembourg National Division	0	0	0	0	—		2	0	—		2	0
The Belval Belvaux	2023–24	Luxembourg 1. Division	12	5	1	0	—		—		—		13	5
Career total			422	137	20	6	7	1	10	2	4	0	463	145

=== International goals ===
Scores and results list Niger's goal tally first.

Goal	Date	Venue	Opponent	Score	Result	Competition
1.	10 October 2010	Stade Général-Seyni-Kountché, Niamey, Niger	Egypt	1–0	1–0	2012 Africa Cup of Nations qualification
2.	17 November 2010	June 11 Stadium, Tripoli, Libya	Libya	1–0	1–1	Friendly
3.	10 August 2011	Stade Général-Seyni-Kountché, Niamey, Niger	Togo	2–1	3–3	Friendly
4.	10 August 2011	Stade Général-Seyni-Kountché, Niamey, Niger	Togo	3–2	3–3	Friendly
5.	4 September 2011	Stade Général-Seyni-Kountché, Niamey, Niger	South Africa	2–0	2–1	2012 Africa Cup of Nations qualification
6.	9 October 2012	Stade Général-Seyni-Kountché, Niamey, Niger	Liberia	4–3	4–3	Friendly
7.	1 January 2013	Stade Général-Seyni-Kountché, Niamey, Niger	Gambia	1–2	1–3	Friendly
8.	6 September 2014	Stade Général-Seyni-Kountché, Niamey, Niger	Cape Verde	1–3	1–3	2015 Africa Cup of Nations qualification
9.	9 October 2015	Addis Ababa Stadium, Addis Ababa, Ethiopia	Somalia	1–0	2–0	2018 FIFA World Cup qualification
10.	9 October 2015	Addis Ababa Stadium, Addis Ababa, Ethiopia	Somalia	2–0	2–0	2018 FIFA World Cup qualification
11.	13 October 2015	Stade Général-Seyni-Kountché, Niamey, Niger	Somalia	2–0	4–0	2018 FIFA World Cup qualification
12.	13 October 2015	Stade Général-Seyni-Kountché, Niamey, Niger	Somalia	3–0	4–0	2018 FIFA World Cup qualification
13.	4 September 2016	Stade Général-Seyni-Kountché, Niamey, Niger	Burundi	?	3–1	2017 Africa Cup of Nations qualification
