= Kassaly Daouda =

Nigerien footballer

Personal information
- Date of birth: 19 August 1983 (age 43)
- Place of birth: Dosso, Niger
- Height: 1.91 m (6 ft 3 in)
- Position: Goalkeeper

Team information
- Current team: Katsina United

Youth career
- –1998: Olympic FC de Niamey

Senior career*
| Years | Team | Apps | (Gls) |
| 1997–2001 | Olympic FC de Niamey | | |
| 2001–2006 | Sahel SC | | |
| 2007–2012 | Cotonsport Garoua | 30 | (0) |
| 2009 | → Rapid II București (loan) | | |
| 2012–2013 | Chippa United | 21 | (0) |
| 2013–2015 | ASN Nigelec | | |
| 2015–2016 | AS Mangasport | | |
| 2016–2018 | ASN Nigelec | | |
| 2018–2023 | Katsina United | 41 | (0) |

International career^{‡}
| 1996–1998 | Niger (youth) | | |
| 2002–2022 | Niger | 89 | (0) |
- * Club domestic league appearances and goals as of 15 December 2023 ‡ National team caps and goals as of 11:04, 8 June 2022 (UTC)

Kassaly Daouda (born 19 August 1983) is a Nigerien footballer who plays as a goalkeeper for Nigerian club Katsina United.

== Career ==
Born in Dosso, Niger, Daouda began his career at Olympic FC de Niamey, and was first chosen for the youth national selection in 1996, then rising to the full national squad in 1998. In August 2002 he gained his first cap, and has been the starting goalkeeper with Niger ever since. Transitioning to goalkeeper for the full Olympic FC, Daouda's side was national league champion, then runners up in 1999. In 2001, Daouda joined rival Niamey club Sahel SC, and as their number one went on to win three national championships and two national cups. He moved to Cameroon club Cotonsport Garoua in 2006 has played in the 2007 CAF Champions League On the back of his success at Cotonsport, Daouda was chosen Niger's Best Player of the Year in 2008.

On 4 February 2009, he moved from Cotonsport Garoua to Rapid Bucharest on loan, and in summer 2009 returned to Cotonsport Garoua.

In September 2012, Daouda signed for South African Premier Soccer League club Chippa United.

He remained starting keeper for the Niger national football team throughout their successful qualification for the 2012 African Cup of Nations, and the tournament itself, as well as for 2013 African Cup of Nations.

In December 2018, Daouda signed for Nigerian Professional Football League club Katsina United.
