= Edmond Mouele =

Gabonese footballer

Personal information
- Date of birth: 18 February 1982 (age 44)
- Place of birth: Libreville, Gabon
- Height: 1.70 m (5 ft 7 in)
- Position: Centre-back

Team information
- Current team: AS Mangasport

Senior career*
| Years | Team | Apps | (Gls) |
| 2002– | AS Mangasport | ? | (?) |

International career
| 2011– | Gabon | 26 | (1) |
- * Club domestic league appearances and goals as of 27 January 2014

Edmond Mouele (born 18 February 1982) is a Gabonese professional footballer who plays as a defender for AS Mangasport. He is the captain of the Gabon national football team.

== Career ==
Mouele played as a right-back for Gabon at the 2012 Africa Cup of Nations finals.
