= Alhassane Issoufou =

Nigerien footballer

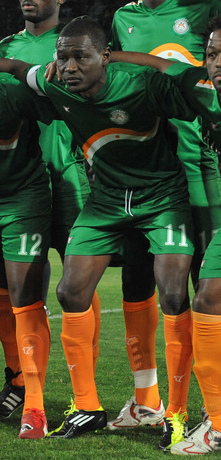
- Issoufou lining up with Niger in 2011

Personal information
- Full name: Alhassane Dante Issoufou
- Date of birth: January 1, 1981 (age 45)
- Place of birth: Niamey, Niger
- Height: 1.80 m (5 ft 11 in)
- Position: Striker

Youth career
- JS du Ténéré

Senior career*
Years	Team	Apps	(Gls)
1997–1999	Zumunta AC	36	(23)
1999–2003	Africa Sports	26	(22)
2000–2002	→ CA Bordj Bou Arreridj (loan)	12	(2)
2003	JS du Ténéré	36	(21)
2004	KSC Lokeren	0	(0)
2005–2006	RC Kadiogo	34	(21)
2006–2007	ASO Chlef	9	(0)
2007–2011	FUS Rabat	76	(22)
2011–2012	Raja Casablanca	4	(0)
2012	→ IZK Khemisset (loan)	11	(3)
2012–2013	Widad Fez		
2013–2014	Raja Beni Mellal		
2014	AS NigÉlec Niamey		

International career
1998–2013	Niger	24	(3)
- * Club domestic league appearances and goals

Alhassane Dante Issoufou (born January 1, 1981) is a Nigerien footballer who plays as a striker.

== Career ==
Before signed with Morrocain club played for ASO Chlef and formerly presented Zumunta AC, Africa Sports, CA Bordj Bou Arreridj, JS du Ténéré, KSC Lokeren and RC Kadiogo.

== International career ==
Issoufou is the member of Niger national football team. He played on 2012 Africa Cup of Nations. As there was no accurate statistic made, Issoufou's caps and number of goals for national team remain mystery, but it seems that he played more than 30 matches and scored at least 3 goals.

== Honours ==
- Won the CAF Confederation Cup once with FUS de Rabat in 2010
