= Rolland Courbis =

French football player and manager (1953–2026)

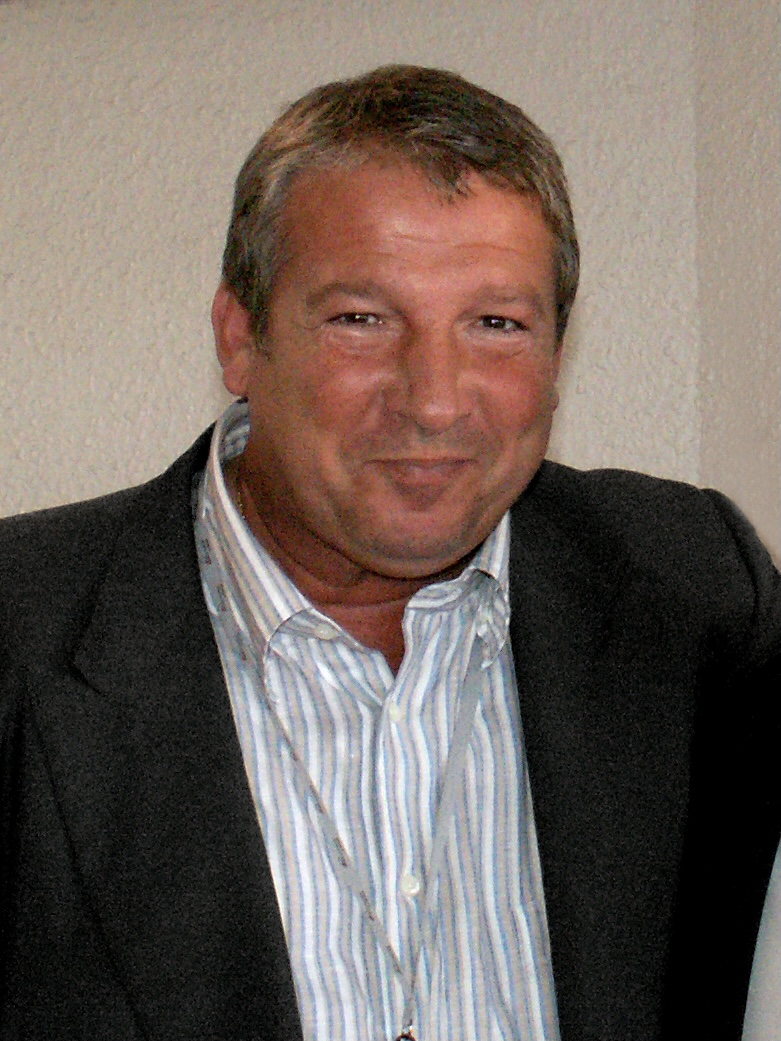
- Courbis in 2006

Personal information
- Date of birth: 12 August 1953
- Place of birth: Marseille, France
- Date of death: 12 January 2026 (aged 72)
- Place of death: Boulogne-Billancourt, France
- Height: 1.82 m (6 ft 0 in)
- Position: Defender

Youth career
- 1966–1971: Marseille

Senior career*
Years	Team	Apps	(Gls)
1971–1972	Marseille	3	(1)
1972–1973	Ajaccio	26	(1)
1973–1974	Olympiacos	4	(0)
1974–1977	Sochaux	102	(0)
1977–1982	Monaco	124	(2)
1982–1985	Toulon	85	(1)
Total		344	(5)

Managerial career
- 1986–1990: Toulon
- 1991–1992: US Marseille Endoume
- 1992–1994: Bordeaux
- 1994–1995: Toulouse
- 1996–1997: Bordeaux
- 1997–1999: Marseille
- 2000–2001: Lens
- 2001–2003: Ajaccio
- 2003: Al-Wahda
- 2004: Alania Vladikavkaz
- 2004–2006: Ajaccio
- 2007–2009: Montpellier
- 2012: Niger
- 2012: Sion
- 2012–2013: USM Alger
- 2013–2015: Montpellier
- 2016: Rennes
- * Club domestic league appearances and goals

Rolland Courbis (French pronunciation: [rɔlɑ̃ kuʁbis]; 12 August 1953 – 12 January 2026) was a French football manager and professional player who played as a defender.

== Career ==
Born in Marseille, Courbis played for Marseille, Ajaccio, Olympiacos, Sochaux, Monaco and Toulon.

Courbis coached Toulon, US Marseille Endoume, Bordeaux, Toulouse, Marseille, Lens, Ajaccio, Al-Wahda, Russian Alania Vladikavkaz, Montpellier HSC, Niger and Sion.

He later worked as a sport radio talk host with RMC, his daily show was called "Coach Courbis".

== Death ==
Courbis died on 12 January 2026, at the age of 72.

== Honours ==
=== As a player ===
Olympiacos

- Super League Greece: 1973–74

Monaco

- French championship: 1977–78, 1981–82
- Coupe de France: 1979–80

Toulon

- French Division 2: 1982–83

=== As a coach ===
Ajaccio

- Ligue 2: 2001–02

Bordeaux

- Coupe de la Ligue runners-up: 1996–97

Marseille

- UEFA Cup runners-up: 1998–99

USM Alger

- Algerian Cup: 2012–13
- UAFA Club Cup: 2012–13
