= William N'Gounou =

Nigerien footballer

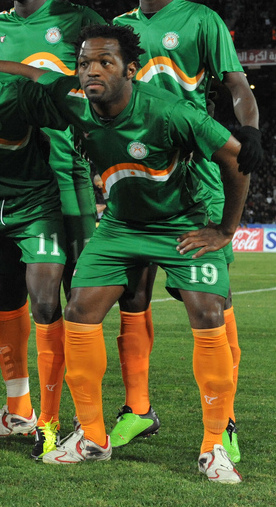
- N'Gounou in 2011

Personal information
- Full name: William Tonji N'Gounou
- Date of birth: 31 July 1983 (age 43)
- Place of birth: Niamey, Niger
- Height: 1.78 m (5 ft 10 in)
- Position: Striker

Senior career*
Years	Team	Apps	(Gls)
2000–2003	Kadji Sports Academy		
2004–2007	AS FAN		
2008–2010	FC Rosengård	53	(18)
2011–2012	IF Limhamn Bunkeflo	29	(6)
2013	KSF Prespa Birlik	20	(7)
Total		102	(31)

International career
2011–2013	Niger	17	(2)
- * Club domestic league appearances and goals as of 13:58, 25 February 2017 (UTC)

William Tonji N'Gounou (born 31 July 1983) is a Nigerien retired footballer who played as a striker.

== Club career ==
N'Gounou played for Kadji Sports Academy, AS FAN, FC Rosengård, IF Limhamn Bunkeflo and KSF Prespa Birlik.

== International career ==
He made his international debut for Niger in 2011, and appeared for them in FIFA World Cup qualification matches.

He was selected for the 2012 Africa Cup of Nations, scoring Niger's first ever and to date, only, goal in tournament history versus Tunisia in 1–2 loss.

== Career statistics ==
=== International ===
Appearances and goals by national team and year
National team	Year	Apps	Goals
Niger	2011	8	1
Niger	2012	8	1
Niger	2013	1	0
Total		17	2

Scores and results list Niger's goal tally first, score column indicates score after each N'Gounou goal.

List of international goals scored by William N'Gounou
No.	Date	Venue	Opponent	Score	Result	Competition
1	15 November 2011	Stade Général Seyni Kountché, Niamey, Niger	Botswana	?–?	1–1	Friendly
2	27 January 2012	Stade d'Angondjé, Libreville, Gabon	Tunisia	1–1	1–2	2012 Africa Cup of Nations
