= Koffi Dan Kowa =

Nigerien footballer

Personal information
- Full name: Emaniel Kofi Dahkawa Djibail
- Date of birth: 19 September 1989 (age 37)
- Place of birth: Accra, Ghana
- Height: 1.84 m (6 ft 0 in)
- Positions: Centre back; defensive midfielder

Youth career
- 2004–2010: Sahel SC

Senior career*
Years	Team	Apps	(Gls)
2010–2013	ES Zarzis	54	(4)
2013–2014	Bidvest Wits	12	(0)
2014–2015	Sporting Goa	0	(0)
2015–2016	Sahel SC		
2016	Beitar Tel Aviv Ramla	8	(1)
2016–2017	Dila Gori	6	(1)
2017	Hapoel Nazareth Illit	18	(2)
2017–2019	Sahel SC		

International career^{‡}
2008–	Niger	62	(5)
- * Club domestic league appearances and goals as of 1 June 2017 ‡ National team caps and goals as of 16 May 2017

Koffi Dan Kowa (born 19 September 1989) is a Nigerien footballer who spent the most of his career as a centre back for Sahel SC.

== Club career ==
Kowa was born in Accra, Ghana. He started his senior career with Nigerien side Sahel SC, before spending three seasons with Espérance Sportive de Zarzis in Tunisia.

In August 2013, Kowa signed a three-year contract with Bidvest Wits who play in the South African Premier Soccer League.

== International career ==
Kowa is a member of Niger national team. He represented the team in the 2012 African Cup of Nations.

=== International goals ===
Scores and results list Niger's goal tally first.

Goal	Date	Venue	Opponent	Score	Result	Competition
1.	19 June 2010	Stade Général-Seyni-Kountché, Niamey, Niger	Chad	1–1	1–1	Friendly
2.	4 September 2011	Stade Général-Seyni-Kountché, Niamey, Niger	South Africa	1–0	2–1	2012 Africa Cup of Nations qualification
3.	17 October 2015	Stade Général-Seyni-Kountché, Niamey, Niger	Togo	2–0	2–0	2016 African Nations Championship qualification
4.	25 October 2015	Stade de Kégué, Lomé, Togo	Togo	1–0	1–1	2016 African Nations Championship qualification
5.	4 September 2016	Stade Général-Seyni-Kountché, Niamey, Niger	Burundi	?	3–1	2017 Africa Cup of Nations qualification
