= Mohamed Chikoto =

Nigerien footballer

Personal information
- Full name: Mohamed Francisco Chikoto
- Date of birth: 28 February 1989 (age 37)
- Place of birth: Parakou, Benin
- Height: 1.78 m (5 ft 10 in)
- Position: Centre back

Youth career
- Aguie F.C.

Senior career*
Years	Team	Apps	(Gls)
2006–2011	Sahel SC	84	(1)
2011–2012	Platinum Stars	1	(0)
2012–2013	AS Marsa	6	(0)
2013–2014	Coton Sport		
2014–2016	ASM Oran	7	(0)
2017–	AS Pagny sur Moselle		

International career
2008–2016	Niger	45	(2)
- * Club domestic league appearances and goals

Mohamed Francisco Chikoto (born 28 February 1989) is a Nigerien professional footballer who plays for Algerian club ASM Oran.

== Career ==
He played previously with the number 3 on the shirt for Sahel SC and joined in August 2011 to Platinum Stars F.C. in the South African Premier Soccer League.

In August 2012, Chikoto joined Tunisian Ligue Professionnelle 1 side AS Marsa. He left Tunisia for Cameroonian outfit Coton Sport in July 2013.

In July 2014, Chikoto joined Algerian Ligue Professionnelle 1 side ASM Oran.

=== International ===
He is a member of the Niger national football team. He scored one of the 2 crucial goals against Guinea, that helped Niger qualify to African Nations Cup 2013.

== International goals ==
Scores and results list Niger's goal tally first.

Goal	Date	Venue	Opponent	Score	Result	Competition
1.	14 October 2012	Stade Général-Seyni-Kountché, Niamey, Niger	Guinea	1–0	2–0	2013 Africa Cup of Nations qualification
2.	5 January 2013	Stade Général-Seyni-Kountché, Niamey, Niger	Togo	2–1	3–1	Friendly
