= Issoufou Boubacar Garba =

Nigerien footballer

Issoufou Boubacar
Personal information
- Full name: Issoufou Boubacar Garba
- Date of birth: 2 February 1990 (age 36)
- Place of birth: Niamey, Niger
- Height: 1.68 m (5 ft 6 in)
- Position: Midfielder

Senior career*
Years	Team	Apps	(Gls)
2004–2006	Zumunta AC		
2006–2007	AS FAN		
–2009	RC Kadiogo		
2009	Muangthong United		
2010	AS FAN		
2011	Muangthong United		
2011–2012	Phuket		
2012	Club Africain	0	(0)
2013	Olympic Niamey		
2013	CS Hammam-Lif	1	(0)
2014	Stade Tunisien	1	(0)
2015–2017	Young Africans		

International career
2011–2014	Niger	21	(1)
- * Club domestic league appearances and goals

Issoufou Boubacar Garba (born 2 February 1990) is a retired Nigerien footballer. He played national football for his country.

== Career ==
Garba played for Muangthong United F.C. in the Thai Premier League in 2011.

On July 13, 2012, Garba signed a four-year contract with Tunisian side Club Africain.

== Honours ==
- Champions Niger Premier League: 2010

== International goals ==
#	Date	Venue	Opponent	Score	Result	Competition
1	October 14, 2012	Niamey	Guinea	2-0	Win	2013 Africa Cup of Nations qualification
