= Gernot Rohr =

German football manager (born 1953)

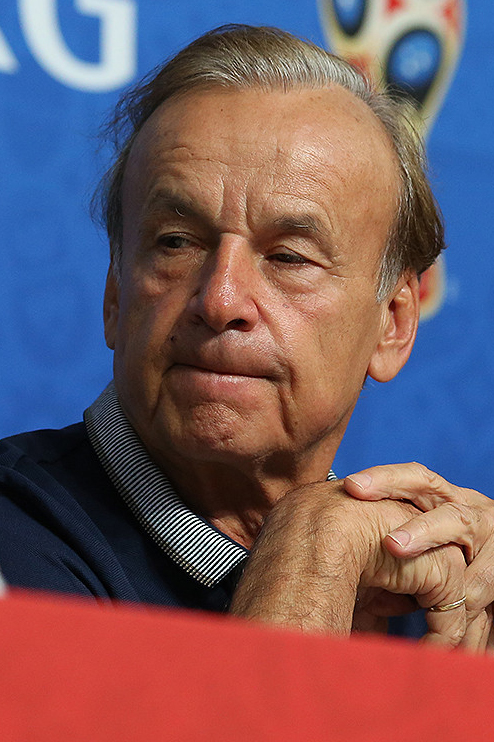
- Rohr as Nigeria manager at the 2018 FIFA World Cup

Personal information
- Date of birth: 28 June 1953 (age 73)
- Place of birth: Mannheim, West Germany
- Height: 1.78 m (5 ft 10 in)
- Position: Defender

Team information
- Current team: Benin (manager)

Youth career
- 1961–1972: VfL Neckarau

Senior career*
Years	Team	Apps	(Gls)
1972–1974	Bayern Munich	6	(0)
1974–1975	Waldhof Mannheim	21	(1)
1975–1977	Kickers Offenbach	62	(1)
1977–1989	Bordeaux	352	(13)
Total		441	(15)

Managerial career
- 1990: Bordeaux
- 1991–1992: Bordeaux
- 1996: Bordeaux
- 1999–2000: Créteil
- 2002–2005: Nice
- 2005–2006: Young Boys
- 2007–2008: Ajaccio
- 2008–2009: Étoile Sahel
- 2009: Nantes
- 2010–2012: Gabon
- 2012–2014: Niger
- 2015: Burkina Faso
- 2016–2021: Nigeria
- 2023–: Benin
Medal record
Men's football
Representing Nigeria (as manager)
Africa Cup of Nations
Bronze medal – third place	2019
- * Club domestic league appearances and goals

Gernot Rohr (born 28 June 1953) is a German professional football coach and former player who is currently the manager of the Benin national team.

== Managerial career ==
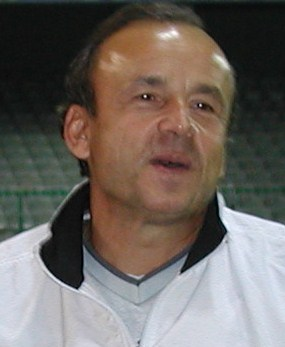
Rohr in 2002

In 1996, he managed Girondins de Bordeaux to the UEFA Cup final, where they lost to Bayern Munich over two legs, 2–0 away and 3–1 at home. Bordeaux's run to the final included a 3–0 win over AC Milan in the quarter-finals. From October 1998 until April 1999 he was sports director of Eintracht Frankfurt.

Rohr was dismissed by Étoile Sportive du Sahel following a third-place finish in the league, outside of the 2010 CAF Champions League places, on 15 May 2009. On 9 June 2009, he was named as the new head coach of the Ligue 2 team FC Nantes, his contract running until 30 June 2011. On 3 December 2009, he was dismissed by FC Nantes and replaced by Jean-Marc Furlan. On 21 February 2010, Rohr replaced French coach Alain Giresse at the helm of the Gabon national football team.

He became manager of Niger national football team in September 2012. He resigned in October 2014.

On 22 December 2015, he was sacked by Burkina Faso national football team as manager.

He was shortlisted for the Guinea national team job in July 2016 but was not given the job. In August 2016, he was named manager of the Nigeria national football team by Amaju Pinnick, the then chief of the Nigeria Football Federation. He won his first game in charge of the Nigerian national team, defeating Tanzania by a lone goal in Uyo, Nigeria. He lost his first match on 10 June as Nigerian senior coach after a 2–0 home loss to South Africa.

On 7 October 2017, his Nigeria-led team became the first African side to qualify for the 2018 FIFA World Cup after a 1–0 win against Zambia. On 17 July 2019, Rohr led Nigeria to a third-place finish at the 2019 Africa Cup of Nations. On 27 May 2020, president of the Nigeria Football Federation NFF Amaju Melvin Pinnick announced a contractual agreement had been concluded for Rohr to extend his contract with the team.

He was given a target of guiding the team to win the 2021 Africa Nation's Cup to be hosted by Cameroon and also qualifying the Super Eagles to the 2022 FIFA World Cup in Qatar. On 12 December 2021, he was sacked despite qualifying for the 2021 Africa Nation's Cup and final round of qualifying for the World Cup playoffs.

== Managerial statistics ==
As of match played 16 November 2026

Team	From	To	Record				
Team	From	To	G	W	D	L	Win %
Gabon	21 February 2010	5 February 2012	19	8	5	6	42.11
Niger	5 September 2012	21 October 2014	23	3	7	13	13.04
Burkina Faso	25 February 2015	22 December 2015	11	3	3	5	27.27
Nigeria	9 August 2016	13 December 2021	64	35	16	13	54.69
Benin	28 February 2023		41	14	11	16	34.15
Total			158	63	42	53	39.87

== See also ==
- National team managers with 100 or more matches
