= Niger national football team =

Men's association football team

Niger
- Nickname: Maynas
- Association: Fédération Nigerienne de Football (FENIFOOT)
- Confederation: CAF (Africa)
- Sub-confederation: WAFU (West Africa)
- Head coach: Vacant
- Captain: Ousmane Diabaté
- Most caps: Kassaly Daouda (89)
- Top scorer: Victorien Adebayor (22)
- Home stadium: Stade Général Seyni Kountché
- FIFA code: NIG
First colours	Second colours

FIFA ranking
- Current: 114 ▼3 (18 November 2026)
- Highest: 68 (November 1994)
- Lowest: 196 (August 2002)

First international
- Chad 2–2 Niger (Abidjan, Ivory Coast; 25 December 1961)

Biggest win
- Niger 7–1 Mauritania (Niamey, Niger; 12 October 1990); Niger 6–0 Bonaire (Casablanca, Morocco; 25 March 2025)

Biggest defeat
- Congo 10–0 Niger (Abidjan, Ivory Coast; 27 December 1961)

Africa Cup of Nations
- Appearances: 2 (first in 2012)
- Best result: Group stage (2012, 2013)

African Nations Championship
- Appearances: 4 (first in 2011)
- Best result: Fourth place (2022)

The Niger national football team represents Niger in international football through the Nigerien Football Federation, a member of Confederation of African Football (CAF). Niger plays in the colors of the flag of Niger, white, green, orange and purple. Their nickname is the Maynas, which is the Hausa name of Dama gazelle, native to Niger. The Dama appears on their badge in the colors of the national flag.

== History ==
Although one of the less successful sides in the strong West Africa region, Niger has produced a couple of noteworthy runs in qualifying tournaments.

One of their best performances was in the 1982 FIFA World Cup qualifiers in which Niger eliminated Somalia and Togo on the away goals rule, but were beaten by Algeria in the third round where only eight teams were left. Notable players in this run included Jacques Komlan, Hassane Adamou and Moussa Kanfideni.

In 1990, they set a record by thrashing Mauritania 7–1 in continental qualifiers, the highest positive score margin for the Maynas.

In the 2004 African Nations Cup qualifiers, Niger won all their home games (including a win over Guinea) to finish on nine points, just three short of qualification.

The Niger squad is also plagued by financial concerns, which have caused them to withdraw from international tournaments on more than one occasion. The Nigerien Football Federation would have turned to fundraising to pay for their trip to the 2010 African Cup of Nations in Angola, had they qualified.

On 10 October 2010, Niger earned a shock 1–0 win over Egypt at home in the 2012 African Cup of Nations qualification.

Despite a failed run for AFCON 2010, Niger hosted and won the UEMOA Tournament in November 2010, and followed up with their first ever qualification for the African Nations Championship in February 2011.

After home wins over South Africa and Sierra Leone, on 8 October 2011 Niger qualified for the Africa Cup of Nations for the first time in its history, despite losing 3–0 in Egypt. Niger, South Africa and Sierra Leone all ended with nine points, but Niger qualified thanks to their superior head-to-head record against their rivals.

At the 2012 African Cup of Nations, Niger was placed in Group C alongside co-hosts Gabon, Tunisia and Morocco. In their opening match, Niger lost 2–0 to Gabon, while against Tunisia in Libreville, Niger trailed 1–0 on an early goal from Youssef Msakni in which he dribbled his way through for a fine goal after just four minutes. William N'Gounou, however, then made history by scoring Niger's first ever goal at the African Cup of Nations. A 1–1 draw looked likely, but Issam Jemâa's goal would eliminate Niger from the tournament. In the final match, Niger faced Morocco in a match featuring two sides already eliminated from the tournament. Younès Belhanda scored on an assist from Marouane Chamakh just 11 minutes from time to give Morocco a 1–0 victory.

Later in 2012, Niger repeated its success in African Nations Cup qualifiers by beating Guinea in a two-legged series to qualify for the 2013 Africa Cup of Nations. Guinea won the first match 1–0, but Niger won 2–0 in the second leg. Goalscorers Mohamed Chikoto and Issoufou Boubacar had sent Niger to another African Cup of Nations tournament.

In their first match at the 2013 Africa Cup of Nations, Niger lost 1–0 to Mali at the Nelson Mandela Bay Stadium in Port Elizabeth. Mali captain Seydou Keita handed his nation the hard-fought victory five minutes before the end of the encounter. Niger then earned their first point ever at the African Cup of nations after holding DR Congo to a 0–0 draw. In the third match, Ghana outclassed Niger 3–0 to reach the quarter-finals as Group B winners. Niger finished bottom of the group.

On 22 May 2014, Niger played a friendly match against Ukraine, marking the first ever match against a European nation. Oumarou Bale scored in the 56th minute, cancelling out a 20th-minute goal from Ivan Ordets before Ukraine won on a goal from Taras Stepanenko as the match finished 2–1.

== Results and fixtures ==
The following is a list of match results in the last 12 months, as well as any future matches that have been scheduled.

Win Draw Loss Fixture

=== 2025 ===
14 November Friendly	Burkina Faso	3–2	Niger	Mohammedia, Morocco
		Report		Stadium: El Bechir Stadium

18 November Friendly	Guinea	1–1	Niger	Berrechid, Morocco
16:30 UTC+1	Baldé 59'	Report	Sako 84'	Attendance: Berrechid Municipal Stadium

=== 2026 ===
27 March Friendly	Libya	0–0	Niger	Casablanca, Morocco
19:00 UTC+1		Report		Stadium: Larbi Zaouli Stadium; Referee: Mustapha Kech Chaf (Morocco)

31 March Friendly	Niger	0–1	Togo	Casablanca, Morocco
17:00 UTC+1		Report	Denkey 5'	Stadium: Père Jégo Stadium; Referee: Mohamed El Baroudi (Morocco)

5 June Friendly	Benin	1–1	Niger	Casablanca, Morocco
20:00 UTC+1	Amadou 37'	Report	Sako 90+2'	Stadium: Père Jégo Stadium; Referee: Naoufal Nachite (Morocco)

8 June Friendly	Mauritania	1–0	Niger	Casablanca, Morocco
20:00 UTC+1	I. Thiam 90+6'	Report		Stadium: Père Jégo Stadium; Referee: Mustapha Kechchaf (Morocco)

25 September 2027 AFCON Qualifiers	Niger	2–1	Lesotho	Accra, Ghana
15:00 UTC+0	Sosah 38'; Sako 45'	Report	Motebang 85' (pen.)	Stadium: Accra Sports Stadium; Referee: Fabricio Duarte (Cape Verde)

29 September 2027 AFCON Qualifiers	Gabon	2–0	Niger	Franceville, Gabon
20:00 UTC+1	Effaghe 53'; Bouanga 77'	Report		Stadium: Franceville Stadium; Referee: Issa Sy (Senegal)

11 November 2027 AFCON Qualifiers	Morocco	5–1	Niger	Casablanca, Morocco
20:00 UTC+0	Zabiri 4'; Hakimi 27', 45+3'; En-Nesyri 77'; Oufkir 90'	Report	Abdourahmane 41'	Stadium: Stade Mohammed V Referee: Omar Artan (Somalia)

15 November 2027 AFCON Qualifiers	Niger	0–1	Morocco	Rabat, Morocco
20:00 UTC+0		Report	Ouazane 22'	Stadium: Prince Moulay Abdellah Stadium; Referee: Tewodros Mitiku (Ethiopia)

=== 2027 ===
24 March 2027 AFCON Qualifiers	Lesotho	v	Niger	TBD, Lesotho
TBD				Stadium: TBD

28 March 2027 AFCON Qualifiers	Niger	v	Gabon	TBD, Niger
TBD				Stadium: TBD

== Coaching history ==
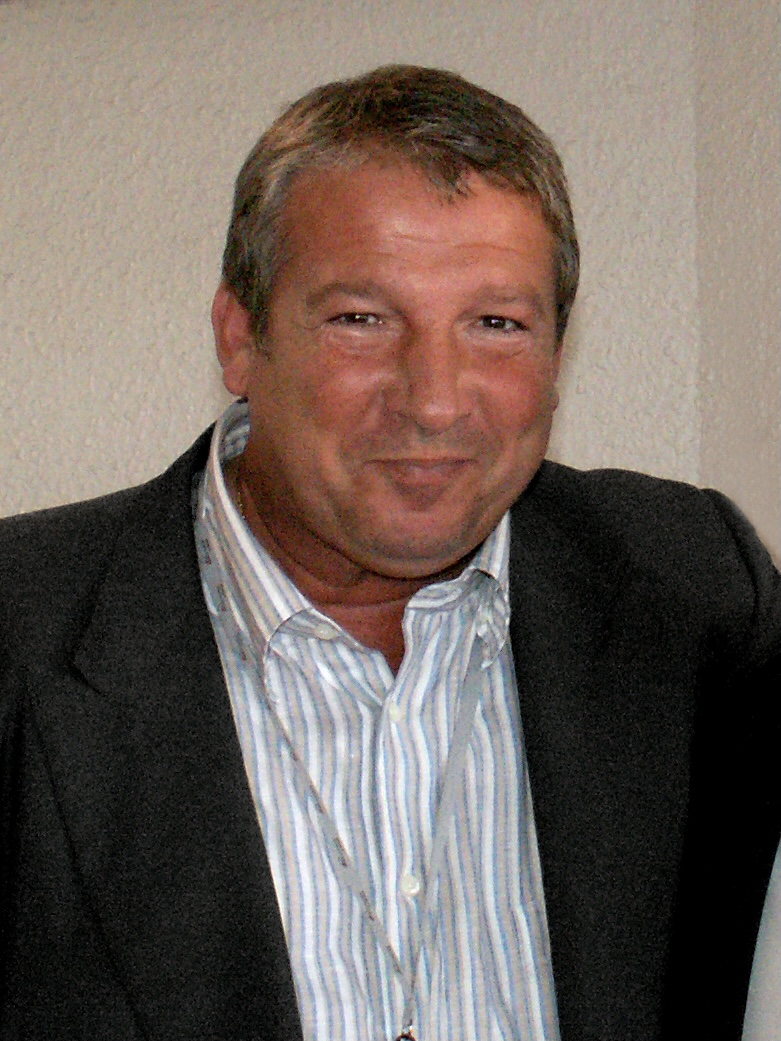
Rolland Courbis became the manager of the national football team of Niger in 2012

- (Germany) Heinz-Peter Uberjahn (1981–1986)
- (Niger) Soumaila Tiemogo (1992)
- (Niger) David Nadjadoum (1992–1994)
- (Niger) Soumaila Tiemogo (1998)
- (France) Amadou Toure (1998)
- (France) Patrice Neveu (1999–2000)
- (France) Jean-Yves Chay (2000)
- (Ivory Coast) Yeo Martial (2002–2003)
- (Togo) Bana Tchanile (2006–2007)
- (Niger) Hamey Amadou (2007–2008)
- (Romania) Dan Anghelescu (2008)
- (Niger) Frederic Costa (2008–2009)
- (Niger) Harouna Doula Gabde (2009–2012)
- (France) Rolland Courbis (2012)
- (Germany) Gernot Rohr (2012–2014)
- (Niger) Cheick Omar Diabate (2014–2015)
- (Ivory Coast) François Zahoui (2015–2019)
- (France) Jean-Guy Wallemme (2019–2020)
- (France) Jean-Michel Cavalli (2020–2023)
- (Niger) Zakaria Yaou Ibrahim (Interim) (2023)
- (Morocco) Ezzaki Badou (2023–present)

== Players ==
=== Current squad ===
The following players were called up for the 2027 Africa Cup of Nations qualification matches against Lesotho and Gabon on 25 and 29 September 2026, respectively and the friendly match against Algeria on 6 October 2026.

Caps and goals are correct as of 6 October 2026, after the match against Algeria.

No.	Pos.	Player	Date of birth (age)	Caps	Goals	Club
1	GK	Issiaka Boukari Kanta	2 July 1999 (age 27)	0	0	(Nigerien Football Federation) ASN Nigelec
16	GK	Younoussa Abiboulaye	3 September 2004 (age 22)	8	0	(Nigerien Football Federation) US GN
22	GK	Mahamadou Tanja	5 July 1996 (age 30)	41	0	(Tanzania Football Federation) Simba
2	DF	Rahim Alhassane	1 January 2002 (age 24)	32	0	(Italian Football Federation) Bologna
3	DF	Oumar Sako	4 May 1996 (age 30)	19	6	(Russian Football Union) Rostov
4	DF	Ibrahim Sani	12 January 2005 (age 21)	2	0	(Nigerien Football Federation) AS Police
13	DF	Mohamed Abdourahmane	11 March 2002 (age 24)	19	0	(Royal Moroccan Football Federation) RCA Zemamra
18	DF	Yacouba Diori	8 September 1997 (age 29)	17	0	(Lebanese Football Association) Ahed
21	DF	Alhabib Hassane	24 August 2003 (age 23)	7	0	(Royal Moroccan Football Federation) Olympique Youssoufia
24	DF	Aboubacar Camara	4 January 2002 (age 24)	12	0	(Albanian Football Federation) Bylis
26	DF	Abraham Adamou Gora	14 September 2002 (age 24)	9	0	(Nigerien Football Federation) US GN
5	MF	Mamane Sabo	14 September 2004 (age 22)	2	0	(Football Association of Serbia) Železničar
6	MF	Youssouf Oumarou	16 February 1993 (age 33)	75	8	(Tunisian Football Federation) Stade Tunisien
8	MF	Amadou Sabo	30 May 2000 (age 26)	30	3	(Lithuanian Football Federation) Sūduva
12	MF	Ousseini Badamassi	21 April 1997 (age 29)	29	4	(Lebanese Football Association) Ahed
14	MF	Ali Mohamed	7 October 1995 (age 31)	54	0	(Israel Football Association) Maccabi Haifa
15	MF	Konan N'Dri	27 October 2000 (age 26)	3	1	(Italian Football Federation) Lecce
19	MF	Hassane Adamou	26 June 2000 (age 26)	13	0	(Royal Moroccan Football Federation) RCA Zemamra
23	MF	Abdoul-Latif Goumey	23 July 2005 (age 21)	11	0	(Congolese Association Football Federation) Saint-Éloi Lupopo
25	MF	Hamza Aboubacar	2005 (age 21)	1	0	(Tunisian Football Federation) Ben Guerdane
7	FW	Daniel Sosah	21 September 1998 (age 28)	36	14	(Kazakhstan Football Federation) Aktobe
9	FW	Kairou Amoustapha	1 January 2001 (age 25)	13	1	(Luxembourg Football Federation) Etzella Ettelbruck
10	FW	Victorien Adebayor	12 November 1996 (age 30)	67	22	(Nigerien Football Federation) US GN
11	FW	Mohamed Wonkoye	19 May 1994 (age 32)	50	6	(Guinean Football Federation) Horoya AC
17	FW	Ibrahim Moussa	1 January 2003 (age 23)	4	0	(Algerian Football Federation) Olympique Akbou
20	FW	Amadou Moutari	19 January 1994 (age 32)	62	3	(Bahrain Football Association) East Riffa

=== Recent call-ups ===
The following players have been called up for Niger in the last 12 months.

Pos.	Player	Date of birth (age)	Caps	Goals	Club	Latest call-up
GK	Yahaya Babari	22 September 1993 (age 33)	2	0	(Niger) AS GNN	v. Mauritania, 8 June 2026
DF	Najeeb Yakubu	1 May 2000 (age 26)	17	0	(Indonesia) Persijap Jepara	v. Gabon, 29 September 2026
DF	Samba O'Neil	2 February 2000 (age 26)	0	0	(South Africa) Sekhukhune United	v. Mauritania, 8 June 2026
DF	Abdoulaye Boureima Katkoré	26 March 1993 (age 33)	53	0	(Saudi Arabia) Al-Entesar Club	v. Togo, 31 March 2026
DF	Adamou Djibo	13 August 1998 (age 28)	19	0	(Democratic Republic of the Congo) TP Mazembe	v. Togo, 31 March 2026
DF	Mohamed Moctar M'Baye	3 September 2004 (age 22)	9	0	(Niger) AS FAN	v. Togo, 31 March 2026
MF	Abdoul Madjid Moumouni	10 May 1994 (age 32)	33	0	(Iraq) Al-Shorta	v. Lesotho, 25 September 2026 ^{INJ}
MF	Hassane Harouna Moussa	1 January 2005 (age 21)	7	0	(Niger) AS FAN	v. Mauritania, 8 June 2026
MF	Ismael Moussa	1 January 2002 (age 24)	4	0	(Algeria) ASO Chlef	v. Mauritania, 8 June 2026
MF	Abdoul Madjid Alzouma	25 December 2006 (age 19)	0	0	(Niger) AS FAN	v. Mauritania, 8 June 2026
FW	Issa Djibrilla	1 January 1996 (age 30)	31	5	(Azerbaijan) Zira	v. Gabon, 29 September 2026
FW	Boubacar Djibril Goumey	14 July 2000 (age 26)	24	2	(Iraq) Al-Nasiriya	v. Mauritania, 8 June 2026
FW	Ousmane Abdoulaye	29 December 2005 (age 20)	0	0	(Brazil) Goiás U20	v. Togo, 31 March 2026
FW	Latif Blessing	30 December 1996 (age 29)	0	0	Free agent	v. Togo, 31 March 2026
FW	Rebo Zakari		0	0	Free agent	v. Togo, 31 March 2026
^{DEC} Player refused to join the team after the call-up.^{INJ} Player withdrew from the squad due to an injury.^{PRE} Preliminary squad.^{RET} Player has retired from international football.^{SUS} Suspended from the national team.

== Records ==
As of 31 March 2026
Players in bold are still active with Niger.

=== Most appearances ===
Rank	Player	Caps	Goals	Career
1	Kassaly Daouda	89	0	2002–2022
2	**Youssouf Oumarou**	75	8	2013–present
3	**Abdoulaye Katkoré**	74	0	2014–present
4	Koffi Dan Kowa	67	4	2008–2018
5	**Victorien Adebayor**	64	22	2015–present
6	**Amadou Moutari**	60	3	2012–present
7	Moussa Maâzou	54	13	2008–2021
8	Lassina Konaté	53	1	2006–2016
8	Souleymane Sacko	53	3	2007–2019
10	**Ali Mohamed**	52	0	2013–present

=== Top goalscorers ===
Rank	Player	Goals	Caps	Ratio	Career
1	**Victorien Adebayor**	22	64	0.34	2015–present
2	**Daniel Sosah**	15	34	0.44	2021–present
3	Moussa Maâzou	13	54	0.24	2008–2021
4	Kamilou Daouda	10	37	0.27	2007–2019
5	**Youssouf Oumarou**	8	75	0.11	2013–present
6	Mounkaila Ide Barkire	7	13	0.54	1992–1998
7	Zakari Lambo	6	10	0.6	1990–1995
7	**Issa Djibrilla**	6	32	0.19	2020–present
7	Mohamed Wonkoye	6	49	0.12	2012–present
10	Mahamane Cissé	5	38	0.13	2013–2022

== Competitive record ==
=== FIFA World Cup ===
FIFA World Cup record									Qualification record					
Year	Round	Position	Pld	W	D*	L	GF	GA	Pld	W	D	L	GF	GA
1930 to 1958	Part of France								Part of France					
(Chile) 1962	Not a FIFA member								Not a FIFA member					
1966 to 1974	Did not enter								Did not enter					
(Argentina) 1978	Did not qualify								2	1	0	1	3	6
(Spain) 1982	Did not qualify								6	2	2	2	4	7
(Mexico) 1986	Withdrew								Withdrew					
(Italy) 1990	Did not enter								Did not enter					
(United States) 1994	Did not qualify								4	2	1	1	3	2
(France) 1998	Withdrew								Withdrew					
(South Korea) (Japan) 2002	Did not enter								Did not enter					
(Germany) 2006	Did not qualify								2	0	0	2	0	7
(South Africa) 2010	Did not qualify								6	1	0	5	5	11
(Brazil) 2014	Did not qualify								6	1	1	4	6	12
(Russia) 2018	Did not qualify								4	2	1	1	6	3
(Qatar) 2022	Did not qualify								6	2	1	3	13	17
(Canada) (Mexico) (United States) 2026	Did not qualify								8	5	0	3	11	10
(Morocco) (Portugal) (Spain) 2030	To be determined								To be determined					
(Saudi Arabia) 2034	To be determined								To be determined					
Total		0/15							44	16	6	22	51	75

=== Africa Cup of Nations ===
Africa Cup of Nations record
Year	Round	Position	Pld	W	D	L	GF	GA
(Zaire) 1955								
(Sudan) 1957	Part of France							
(United Arab Republic) 1959	Part of France							
(Ethiopia) 1962	Not affiliated to CAF							
(Ghana) 1963	Not affiliated to CAF							
(Tunisia) 1965	Not affiliated to CAF							
(Ethiopia) 1968	Did not enter							
(Sudan) 1970	Did not qualify							
(Cameroon) 1972	Did not qualify							
(Egypt) 1974	Withdrew							
(Ethiopia) 1976	Did not qualify							
(Ghana) 1978	Withdrew							
(Nigeria) 1980	Withdrew							
(Libya) 1982	Did not enter							
(Ivory Coast) 1984	Did not qualify							
(Egypt) 1986	Did not enter							
(Morocco) 1988	Did not enter							
(Algeria) 1990	Did not enter							
(Senegal) 1992	Did not qualify							
(Tunisia) 1994	Did not qualify							
(South Africa) 1996	Withdrew during qualifying							
(Burkina Faso) 1998	Disqualified for withdrawing in 1996							
(Ghana) (Nigeria) 2000 to (Angola) 2010	Did not qualify							
(Equatorial Guinea) (Gabon) 2012	Group stage	15th	3	0	0	3	1	5
(South Africa) 2013	Group stage	15th	3	0	1	2	0	4
(Equatorial Guinea) 2015	Did not qualify							
(Gabon) 2017	Did not qualify							
(Egypt) 2019	Did not qualify							
(Cameroon) 2021	Did not qualify							
(Ivory Coast) 2023	Did not qualify							
(Morocco) 2025	Did not qualify							
(Kenya) (Tanzania) (Uganda) 2027	To be determined							
(Morocco) (Algeria) (Tunisia) 2029	To be determined							
Total	Group stage	2/35	6	0	1	5	1	9

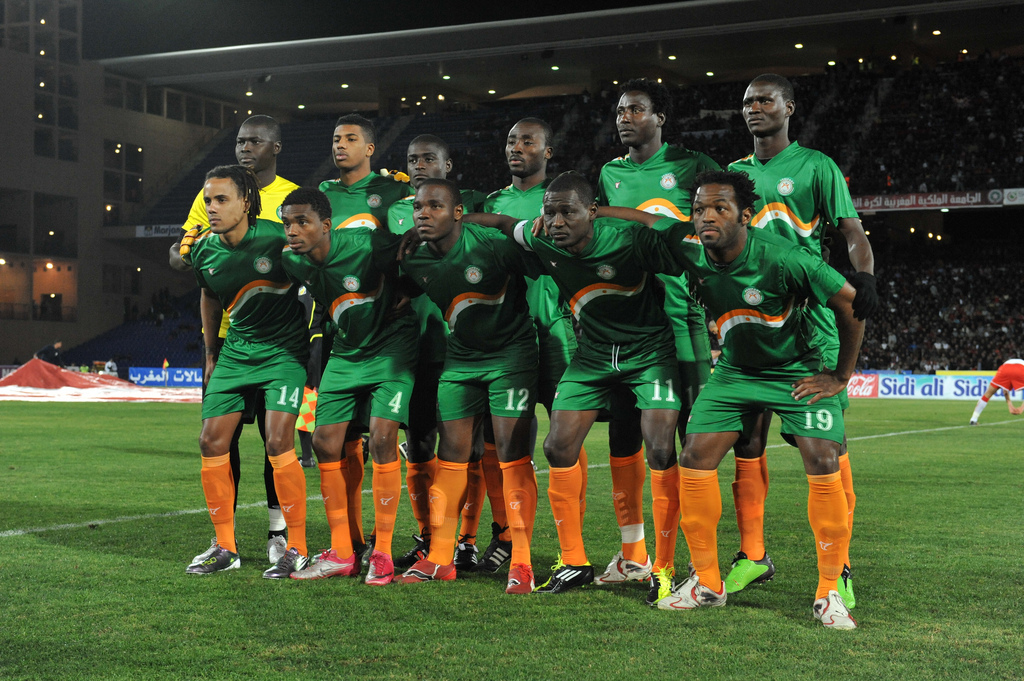
Niger national team against Morocco, 9 February 2011

=== African Nations Championship ===
African Nations Championship record
Appearances: 4
Year	Round	Position	Pld	W	D*	L	GF	GA
(Ivory Coast) 2009	Did not qualify							
(Sudan) 2011	Quarter-finals	7th	4	2	1	1	3	3
(South Africa) 2014	Did not qualify							
(Rwanda) 2016	Group stage	16th	3	0	1	2	3	11
(Morocco) 2018	Did not qualify							
(Cameroon) 2020	Group stage	12th	3	0	2	1	2	3
(Algeria) 2022	Fourth place	4th	5	2	1	2	3	6
Total	Fourth place	4/7	15	4	5	6	11	23

== Head-to-head record ==
As of 6 October 2026

Opponent	Games	Wins	Draws	Losses	Goals For	Goals Against	Goal Differential
Algeria	11	1	1	9	4	29	−25
Angola	4	0	0	4	2	8	−6
Benin	16	3	6	7	18	25	−7
Bonaire	1	1	0	0	6	0	+6
Botswana	3	2	1	0	4	2	+2
Burundi	1	1	0	0	3	1	+2
Burkina Faso	19	3	8	9	17	29	−12
Cameroon	3	0	1	2	0	4	−4
Central African Republic	3	0	2	1	3	5	−2
Chad	2	1	1	0	2	1	+1
Congo	7	1	2	4	7	13	−6
Djibouti	2	2	0	0	11	4	+7
DR Congo	3	1	1	1	4	2	+2
Egypt	7	1	1	5	2	19	−17
Equatorial Guinea	1	0	1	0	1	1	0
Ethiopia	5	2	0	3	4	7	−3
Eswatini	2	1	1	0	2	1	+1
Gabon	9	2	0	7	10	21	−11
Gambia	2	0	1	1	1	3	-2
Ghana	13	1	2	10	7	40	−33
Guinea	8	3	0	6	9	14	−5
Ivory Coast	13	0	2	11	9	29	−20
Lesotho	3	2	0	1	5	4	+1
Liberia	8	3	2	3	7	10	−3
Libya	8	0	5	3	7	13	−6
Madagascar	2	0	1	1	2	6	−4
Mali	8	1	2	5	4	10	−6
Mauritania	5	3	2	0	10	3	+7
Morocco	9	1	0	8	3	23	−20
Mozambique	1	0	1	0	1	1	0
Namibia	1	1	0	0	2	1	+1
Nigeria	3	0	0	3	1	7	−6
Senegal	7	1	2	4	3	7	−4
Sierra Leone	7	4	0	3	12	15	−3
Somalia	3	1	2	0	4	1	+1
South Africa	3	1	1	1	2	3	−1
Sudan	2	1	0	1	4	1	+3
Tanzania	4	1	1	2	2	3	-1
Togo	12	4	3	5	17	18	-1
Tunisia	3	0	0	3	2	4	−2
Uganda	8	2	2	4	7	11	-4
Ukraine	1	0	0	1	1	2	−1
United Arab Emirates	1	0	0	1	0	4	−4
Zambia	2	2	0	0	3	1	+2
Zimbabwe	1	0	1	0	1	1	+0
45 Countries	238	54	54	129	227	406	−179

== Honours ==
=== Regional ===
- West African Nations Cup
  - (bronze) Third place (1): 1986
- UEMOA Tournament
  - (gold) Champions (1): 2010
  - (silver) Runners-up (2): 2007, 2009
