= 2010 FIFA World Cup qualification – CAF second round =

Football tournament qualification stage

This page provides the summaries of the CAF second round matches for the 2010 FIFA World Cup qualification and the 2010 Africa Cup of Nations. The 48 qualifiers (45 direct entrants plus 3 winners of the first round) were split into 12 groups of four in the draw held in Durban, South Africa, on 25 November 2007. Teams in each group played a home-and-away round-robin in 2008, with the 12 groups winners and 8 best runners-up advancing to the third round. As not all groups were of equal size after the exclusion of Ethiopia and the withdrawal of Eritrea, when ranking the runners-up, their results against their group's 4th placed team would not be counted.

== Seeding ==
One team from each of the following pots was drawn into each group.

Pot A	Pot B	Pot C	Pot D
Cameroon; Nigeria; Ivory Coast; Morocco; Ghana; Tunisia; Egypt; Guinea; Senegal; Mali; Angola; Togo	Zambia; South Africa; Cape Verde; DR Congo; Algeria; Burkina Faso; Benin; Mozambique; Libya; Ethiopia; Congo; Zimbabwe	Uganda; Botswana; Equatorial Guinea; Tanzania; Gabon; Malawi; Sudan; Burundi; Liberia; Rwanda; Eritrea; Namibia	Gambia; Mauritania; Kenya; Chad; Lesotho; Mauritius; Niger; Swaziland; Seychelles; Sierra Leone; Madagascar; Djibouti

=== Automatic qualification for hosts ===
- Due to the fact that the second round was also the qualifying round for the 2010 Africa Cup of Nations, South Africa took part, despite the fact that they had already qualified for the 2010 FIFA World Cup by virtue of being the host nation. South Africa participated in one of the twelve groups, but ultimately failed to qualify for the Africa Cup of Nations tournament in Angola.
- Conversely, Angola had already qualified for the 2010 Africa Cup of Nations by virtue of being hosts, but participated in this round as an attempt to qualify for the World Cup during the third round of CAF qualifiers. Angola, however, did not qualify.

== Results and standings ==
=== Group 1 ===
Pos	Team	Pld	W	D	L	GF	GA	GD	Pts	Qualification	(Cameroon)	(Cape Verde)	(Tanzania)	(Mauritius)
1	Cameroon	6	5	1	0	14	2	+12	16	Third round	—	2–0	2–1	5–0
2	Cape Verde	6	3	0	3	7	8	−1	9		1–2	—	1–0	3–1
3	Tanzania	6	2	2	2	9	6	+3	8		0–0	3–1	—	1–1
4	Mauritius	6	0	1	5	3	17	−14	1		0–3	0–1	1–4	—

31 May 2008
16:00 UTC+3

Tanzania	1–1	Mauritius
Mrwanda 70'	Report	Marquette 39'

Benjamin Mkapa National Stadium, Dar es Salaam
Attendance: 35,000
Referee: Kenias Marange (Zimbabwe)
31 May 2008
15:30 UTC+1

Cameroon	2–0	Cape Verde
R. Song 8'; Eto'o 56' (pen.)	Report

Stade Omnisports Ahmadou Ahidjo, Yaoundé
Attendance: 20,000
Referee: Kokou Djaoupe (Togo)

7 June 2008
16:00 UTC−1

Cape Verde	1–0	Tanzania
Babanco 73'	Report

Estádio da Várzea, Praia
Attendance: 6,000
Referee: Abdellah El Achiri (Morocco)
8 June 2008
15:00 UTC+4

Mauritius	0–3	Cameroon
	Report	Bikey 11'; Eto'o 27'; Bebbe 87'

Stade George V, Curepipe
Attendance: 2,400
Referee: Jose Antonio De Sousa (Angola)

14 June 2008
16:00 UTC+3

Tanzania	0–0	Cameroon
	Report

Benjamin Mkapa National Stadium, Dar es Salaam
Attendance: 55,000
Referee: Coffi Codjia (Benin)
15 June 2008
15:00 UTC+4

Mauritius	0–1	Cape Verde
	Report	Dady 43' (pen.)

Stade George V, Curepipe
Attendance: 1,480
Referee: Wellington Kaoma (Zambia)

21 June 2008
15:30 UTC+1

Cameroon	2–1	Tanzania
Eto'o 67', 89'	Report	Mrwanda 78'

Stade Omnisports Ahmadou Ahidjo, Yaoundé
Attendance: 25,000
Referee: John Mendy (Gambia)
22 June 2008
16:00 UTC−1

Cape Verde	3–1	Mauritius
Dady 45+1', 57'; Soares 76'	Report	Sophie 67'

Estádio da Várzea, Praia
Attendance: 2,850
Referee: Koman Coulibaly (Mali)

6 September 2008
15:00 UTC+4

Mauritius	1–4	Tanzania
Marquette 13'	Report	Nsajigwa 12'; Khalfan 19'; Tegete 30', 34'

Stade George V, Curepipe
Attendance: 103
Referee: Alfred Ndinya (Kenya)
6 September 2008
16:00 UTC−1

Cape Verde	1–2	Cameroon
Lito 39'	Report	Emana 51'; Tchoyi 65'

Estádio da Várzea, Praia
Attendance: 5,000
Referee: Jean-Claude Labrosse (Seychelles)

11 October 2008
16:00 UTC+3

Tanzania	3–1	Cape Verde
Iddy 5'; Tegete 26'; Ngassa 74'	Report	Semedo 34'

Benjamin Mkapa National Stadium, Dar es Salaam
Attendance: 10,000
Referee: Jerome Damon (South Africa)
11 October 2008
15:30 UTC+1

Cameroon	5–0	Mauritius
Eto'o 26', 47' (pen.); Meyong Ze 57', 73'; Makoun 71'	Report

Stade Omnisports Ahmadou Ahidjo, Yaoundé
Attendance: 12,000
Referee: Mohamed Ould Lemghambodj (Mauritania)

=== Group 2 ===
Pos	Team	Pld	W	D	L	GF	GA	GD	Pts	Qualification	(Guinea)	(Kenya)	(Zimbabwe)	(Namibia)
1	Guinea	6	3	2	1	9	5	+4	11	Third round	—	3–2	0–0	4–0
2	Kenya	6	3	1	2	8	5	+3	10	Third round	2–0	—	2–0	1–0
3	Zimbabwe	6	1	3	2	4	6	−2	6		0–0	0–0	—	2–0
4	Namibia	6	2	0	4	7	12	−5	6		1–2	2–1	4–2	—

31 May 2008
16:00 UTC+1

Namibia	2–1	Kenya
Risser 14'; Khaiseb 89'	Report	Makacha 40'

Sam Nujoma Stadium, Windhoek
Attendance: 6,000
Referee: Muhmed Ssegonga (Uganda)
1 June 2008
17:00 UTC+0

Guinea	0–0	Zimbabwe
	Report

Stade 28 Septembre, Conakry
Attendance: 12,000
Referee: Djamel Haimoudi (Algeria)

7 June 2008
16:00 UTC+3

Kenya	2–0	Guinea
Oliech 3', 50'	Report

Nyayo National Stadium, Nairobi
Attendance: 35,000
Referee: Lambert Eyene (Cameroon)
8 June 2008
15:00 UTC+2

Zimbabwe	2–0	Namibia
Mushangazhike 27', 68'	Report

Rufaro Stadium, Harare
Attendance: 27,979
Referee: Verson Lwanja (Malawi)

14 June 2008
16:00 UTC+3

Kenya	2–0	Zimbabwe
Mariga 12'; Oliech 85'	Report

Nyayo National Stadium, Nairobi
Attendance: 27,500
Referee: Badara Diatta (Senegal)
14 June 2008
15:00 UTC+1

Namibia	1–2	Guinea
Bester 41'	Report	Is. Bangoura 25'; Feindouno 45'

Sam Nujoma Stadium, Windhoek
Attendance: 5,000
Referee: Emmanuel Imiere (Nigeria)

22 June 2008
15:00 UTC+2

Zimbabwe	0–0	Kenya
	Report

Rufaro Stadium, Harare
Attendance: 23,000
Referee: Alex Kotey (Ghana)
22 June 2008
17:00 UTC+0

Guinea	4–0	Namibia
Feindouno 32'; Is. Bangoura 36', 54', 58'	Report

Stade 28 Septembre, Conakry
Attendance: 15,000
Referee: Herminio Monteiro Lopes (Angola)

6 September 2008
16:00 UTC+3

Kenya	1–0	Namibia
Jamal 44' (pen.)	Report

Moi International Sports Centre, Nairobi
Attendance: 40,000
Referee: Jean-Marie Hicuburundi (Burundi)
7 September 2008
15:00 UTC+2

Zimbabwe	0–0	Guinea
	Report

Rufaro Stadium, Harare
Attendance: 23,000
Referee: Divine Evehe (Cameroon)

11 October 2008
16:00 UTC+2

Namibia	4–2	Zimbabwe
Risser 20', 49'; Bester 32'; Shipanga 44'	Report	Nyandoro 51'; Malajila 83'

Sam Nujoma Stadium, Windhoek
Attendance: 4,000
Referee: Koman Coulibaly (Mali)
12 October 2008
16:15 UTC+0

Guinea	3–2	Kenya
Is. Bangoura 31'; Bah 51'; Zayatte 80'	Report	Ouma 70'; Oliech 90+3'

Stade 28 Septembre, Conakry
Attendance: 16,400
Referee: Eddy Maillet (Seychelles)

=== Group 3 ===
Pos	Team	Pld	W	D	L	GF	GA	GD	Pts	Qualification	(Benin)	(Angola)	(Uganda)	(Niger)
1	Benin	6	4	0	2	12	8	+4	12	Third round	—	3–2	4–1	2–0
2	Angola	6	3	1	2	11	8	+3	10		3–0	—	0–0	3–1
3	Uganda	6	3	1	2	8	9	−1	10		2–1	3–1	—	1–0
4	Niger	6	1	0	5	5	11	−6	3		0–2	1–2	3–1	—

31 May 2008
16:00 UTC+3

Uganda	1–0	Niger
Sekagya 56'	Report

Nelson Mandela National Stadium, Kampala
Attendance: 25,000
Referee: Divine Evehe (Cameroon)
1 June 2008
15:30 UTC+1

Angola	3–0	Benin
Flávio 60'; Job 78'; Mendonça 84'	Report

Estádio dos Coqueiros, Luanda
Attendance: 6,000
Referee: Jerome Damon (South Africa)

8 June 2008
16:00 UTC+1

Benin	4–1	Uganda
Omotoyossi 15', 86'; O. Tchomogo 17'; Sessègnon 69'	Report	Ssepuuya 8'

Stade de l'Amitié, Cotonou
Attendance: 10,200
Referee: Ousmane Karembe (Mali)
8 June 2008
16:00 UTC+1

Niger	1–2	Angola
Alassane 3'	Report	Flávio 29'; Yamba Asha 72'

Stade Général Seyni Kountché, Niamey
Attendance: 23,000
Referee: Slim Jedidi (Tunisia)

14 June 2008
16:00 UTC+3

Uganda	3–1	Angola
Ssepuuya 7'; Batabaire 19'; Wagaluka 75'	Report	Mantorras 90'

Nelson Mandela National Stadium, Kampala
Attendance: 20,000
Referee: Eddy Maillet (Seychelles)
14 June 2008
16:00 UTC+1

Niger	0–2	Benin
	Report	S. Tchomogo 59'; Omotoyossi 65'

Stade Général Seyni Kountché, Niamey
Attendance: 5,000
Referee: Djamel Haimoudi (Algeria)

22 June 2008
16:00 UTC+1

Benin	2–0	Niger
Ahouéya 45'; Anicet 53' (o.g.)	Report

Stade de l'Amitié, Cotonou
Attendance: 25,000
Referee: Jean-Claude Niyongabo (Burundi)
23 June 2008
15:30 UTC+1
(Note: Match originally scheduled for 22 June 2008 postponed because the referees' flight was late.)

Angola	0–0	Uganda
	Report

Estádio dos Coqueiros, Luanda
Attendance: 7,500
Referee: Sule Mana (Nigeria)

7 September 2008
16:00 UTC+1

Benin	3–2	Angola
Adénon 2'; Omotoyossi 52', 66'	Report	Flávio 12'; Locó 78'

Stade de l'Amitié, Cotonou
Attendance: 30,000
Referee: Mohamed Benouza (Algeria)
7 September 2008
16:30 UTC+1

Niger	3–1	Uganda
Issoufou 68', 85'; Kamilou 87'	Report	Obua 33'

Stade Général Seyni Kountché, Niamey
Attendance: 5,000
Referee: Joseph Lamptey (Ghana)

12 October 2008
16:00 UTC+3

Uganda	2–1	Benin
Massa 50', 53'	Report	Omotoyossi 30'

Nelson Mandela National Stadium, Kampala
Attendance: 2,913
Referee: Essam Abdel-Fatah (Egypt)
12 October 2008
16:00 UTC+1

Angola	3–1	Niger
Daouda 53' (o.g.); Gilberto 68'; Zé Kalanga 73'	Report	Mallam 20'

Estádio dos Coqueiros, Luanda
Attendance: 3,200
Referee: Michel Gasingwa (Rwanda)

=== Group 4 ===
Pos	Team	Pld	W	D	L	GF	GA	GD	Pts	Qualification	(Nigeria)	(South Africa)	(Sierra Leone)	(Equatorial Guinea)
1	Nigeria	6	6	0	0	11	1	+10	18	Third round	—	2–0	4–1	2–0
2	South Africa	6	2	1	3	5	5	0	7		0–1	—	0–0	4–1
3	Sierra Leone	6	2	1	3	4	8	−4	7		0–1	1–0	—	2–1
4	Equatorial Guinea	6	1	0	5	4	10	−6	3		0–1	0–1	2–0	—

1 June 2008
15:30 UTC+1

Equatorial Guinea	2–0	Sierra Leone
Ronan 47'; Epitié 57'	Report

Estadio de Malabo, Malabo
Attendance: 13,000
Referee: Coffi Codjia (Benin)
1 June 2008
16:00 UTC+1

Nigeria	2–0	South Africa
Uche 10'; Nwaneri 45+1'	Report

Abuja Stadium, Abuja
Attendance: 50,000
Referee: Koman Coulibaly (Mali)

7 June 2008
15:00 UTC+2

South Africa	4–1	Equatorial Guinea
Dikgacoi 9', 90+3'; Moriri 33'; Fanteni 62'	Report	Juvenal 78' (pen.)

Atteridgeville Super Stadium, Pretoria
Attendance: 10,000
Referee: Abdou Diouf (Senegal)
7 June 2008
14:30 UTC+0

Sierra Leone	0–1	Nigeria
	Report	Yobo 88'

National Stadium, Freetown
Attendance: 25,000
Referee: Sam Korti (Liberia)

14 June 2008
14:30 UTC+0

Sierra Leone	1–0	South Africa
Kallon 22' (pen.)	Report

National Stadium, Freetown
Attendance: 15,000
Referee: Lassina Pare (Burkina Faso)
15 June 2008
15:30 UTC+1

Equatorial Guinea	0–1	Nigeria
	Report	Yobo 5'

Estadio de Malabo, Malabo
Attendance: 15,200
Referee: John Mendy (Gambia)

21 June 2008
15:00 UTC+2

South Africa	0–0	Sierra Leone
	Report

Atteridgeville Super Stadium, Pretoria
Attendance: 12,000
Referee: Divine Evehe (Cameroon)
21 June 2008
16:00 UTC+1

Nigeria	2–0	Equatorial Guinea
Yakubu 45'; I. Uche 84'	Report

Abuja Stadium, Abuja
Attendance: 20,000
Referee: Jamel Ambaya (Libya)

6 September 2008
15:00 UTC+2

South Africa	0–1	Nigeria
	Report	I. Uche 71'

Telkom Park, Port Elizabeth
Attendance: 25,000
Referee: Verson Lwanja (Malawi)
6 September 2008
16:30 UTC+0

Sierra Leone	2–1	Equatorial Guinea
Conteh 30'; Suma 73'	Report	Bodipo 83' (pen.)

National Stadium, Freetown
Attendance: 22,000
Referee: Noumandiez Doué (Ivory Coast)

11 October 2008
16:00 UTC+1

Equatorial Guinea	0–1	South Africa
	Report	Tshabalala 9'

Estadio de Malabo, Malabo
Attendance: 6,500
Referee: Kokou Djaoupe (Togo)
11 October 2008
16:00 UTC+1

Nigeria	4–1	Sierra Leone
Obodo 21'; Obinna 35'; Odemwingie 45'; Odiah 51'	Report	Yobo 32' (o.g.)

Abuja Stadium, Abuja
Attendance: 20,000
Referee: Wellington Kaoma (Zambia)

=== Group 5 ===
Pos	Team	Pld	W	D	L	GF	GA	GD	Pts	Qualification	(Ghana)	(Gabon)	(Libya)	(Lesotho)
1	Ghana	6	4	0	2	11	5	+6	12	Third round	—	2–0	3–0	3–0
2	Gabon	6	4	0	2	8	3	+5	12	Third round	2–0	—	1–0	2–0
3	Libya	6	4	0	2	7	4	+3	12		1–0	1–0	—	4–0
4	Lesotho	6	0	0	6	2	16	−14	0		2–3	0–3	0–1	—

1 June 2008
17:00 UTC+0

Ghana	3–0	Libya
Tagoe 16'; Agogo 55'; Kingston 67'	Report

Baba Yara Stadium, Kumasi
Attendance: 31,000
Referee: Eddy Maillet (Seychelles)

7 June 2008
20:00 UTC+2

Libya	1–0	Gabon
Ecuele Manga 5' (o.g.)	Report

11 June Stadium, Tripoli
Attendance: 30,000
Referee: Ibrahim Chaibou (Niger)
8 June 2008
18:00 UTC+2

Lesotho	2–3	Ghana
Muso 90+1'; Seema 90+2'	Report	Kingston 15'; Agogo 42', 62'

Seisa Ramabodu Stadium, Bloemfontein (South Africa) (Note: Lesotho opted to play all their matches in South Africa.)
Attendance: 19,000
Referee: Michel Gasingwa (Rwanda)

14 June 2008
15:30 UTC+1

Gabon	2–0	Ghana
Méyé 42'; N'Guéma 66'	Report

Stade Omar Bongo, Libreville
Attendance: 39,000
Referee: Mohamed Benouza (Algeria)
15 June 2008
15:00 UTC+2

Lesotho	0–1	Libya
	Report	Osman 81'

Seisa Ramabodu Stadium, Bloemfontein (South Africa)
Attendance: 9,000
Referee: Kenias Marange (Zimbabwe)

20 June 2008
21:00 UTC+2

Libya	4–0	Lesotho
Al Fazzani 4'; Daoud 50'; Al Shibani 69'; Shaban 81'	Report

11 June Stadium, Tripoli
Attendance: 30,000
Referee: Aouaz Trabelsi (Tunisia)
22 June 2008
17:00 UTC+0

Ghana	2–0	Gabon
Tagoe 30'; Muntari 78'	Report

Ohene Djan Stadium, Accra
Attendance: 29,040
Referee: Jerome Damon (South Africa)

28 June 2008
15:30 UTC+1
(Note: Match originally scheduled for 31 May 2008 postponed as the visiting Lesotho squad failed to arrive after a strike by air traffic controllers in Gabon.)

Gabon	2–0	Lesotho
Do Marcolino 42', 65'	Report

Stade Omar Bongo, Libreville
Attendance: 15,000
Referee: John Mendy (Gambia)

5 September 2008
22:00 UTC+2

Libya	1–0	Ghana
Osman 84'	Report

11 June Stadium, Tripoli
Attendance: 45,000
Referee: Koman Coulibaly (Mali)
7 September 2008
15:00 UTC+2

Lesotho	0–3	Gabon
	Report	Ecuele Manga 56'; Méyé 72'; Mbanangoyé 90+4'

Seisa Ramabodu Stadium, Bloemfontein (South Africa)
Attendance: 1,500
Referee: Essam Abdel-Fatah (Egypt)

11 October 2008
15:30 UTC+1

Gabon	1–0	Libya
Mbanangoyé 82'	Report

Stade Omar Bongo, Libreville
Attendance: 25,000
Referee: Daniel Bennett (South Africa)
11 October 2008
14:30 UTC+0

Ghana	3–0	Lesotho
Appiah 19'; Agogo 24'; Amoah 67'	Report

Sekondi Stadium, Sekondi-Takoradi
Attendance: 20,000
Referee: Khalid Abdel Rahman (Sudan)

=== Group 6 ===
Pos	Team	Pld	W	D	L	GF	GA	GD	Pts	Qualification	(Algeria)	(The Gambia)	(Senegal)	(Liberia)
1	Algeria	6	3	1	2	7	4	+3	10	Third round	—	1–0	3–2	3–0
2	Gambia	6	2	3	1	6	3	+3	9		1–0	—	0–0	3–0
3	Senegal	6	2	3	1	9	7	+2	9		1–0	1–1	—	3–1
4	Liberia	6	0	3	3	4	12	−8	3		0–0	1–1	2–2	—

31 May 2008
19:30 UTC+0

Senegal	1–0	Algeria
Faye 79'	Report

Stade Leopold Senghor, Dakar
Attendance: 55,000
Referee: Alex Kotey (Ghana)
1 June 2008
16:00 UTC+0

Liberia	1–1	Gambia
Makor 85'	Report	Jarju 17'

National Complex, Monrovia
Attendance: 20,000
Referee: Yakhouba Keita (Guinea)

Eight people, all young men, were crushed to death by crowds before this match outside the stadium.

6 June 2008
19:30 UTC+1

Algeria	3–0	Liberia
Djebbour 14'; Ziani 18', 46' (pen.)	Report

Stade Mustapha Tchaker, Blida
Attendance: 22,000
Referee: Mohamed Ould Lemghambodj (Mauritania)
8 June 2008
17:00 UTC+0

Gambia	0–0	Senegal
	Report

Independence Stadium, Bakau
Attendance: 24,500
Referee: Aldrin Ncobo (South Africa)

14 June 2008
17:00 UTC+0

Gambia	1–0	Algeria
Jaiteh 19' (pen.)	Report

Independence Stadium, Bakau
Attendance: 18,000
Referee: Koman Coulibaly (Mali)
15 June 2008
16:00 UTC+0

Liberia	2–2	Senegal
Williams 78'; Makor 88'	Report	Diouf 47'; Gueye 55'

National Complex, Monrovia
Attendance: 25,000
Referee: Kokou Djaoupe (Togo)

20 June 2008
19:30 UTC+1

Algeria	1–0	Gambia
Yahia 33'	Report

Stade Mustapha Tchaker, Blida
Attendance: 24,000
Referee: Gil Ndume (Gabon)
21 June 2008
19:30 UTC+0

Senegal	3–1	Liberia
Sonko 8'; Diouf 32'; H. Camara 65'	Report	Krangar 89'

Stade Leopold Senghor, Dakar
Attendance: 40,000
Referee: Ibrahim Chaibou (Niger)

5 September 2008
22:00 UTC+1

Algeria	3–2	Senegal
Cheikh Gueye 60' (o.g.); Saïfi 67'; Yahia 73'	Report	Diao 54'; Gueye 90'

Stade Mustapha Tchaker, Blida
Attendance: 25,000
Referee: Eddy Maillet (Seychelles)
6 September 2008
16:30 UTC+0

Gambia	3–0	Liberia
Demba 10', 80'; Jallow 26'	Report

Independence Stadium, Bakau
Attendance: 10,000
Referee: Jamel Ambaya (Libya)

11 October 2008
16:00 UTC+0

Liberia	0–0	Algeria
	Report

National Complex, Monrovia
Attendance: 2,000
Referee: Ahmed Auda (Egypt)
11 October 2008
16:00 UTC+0

Senegal	1–1	Gambia
Mangane 67'	Report	Jaiteh 87'

Stade Leopold Senghor, Dakar
Attendance: 50,000
Referee: Kacem Bennaceur (Tunisia)

=== Group 7 ===
Pos	Team	Pld	W	D	L	GF	GA	GD	Pts	Qualification	(Ivory Coast)	(Mozambique)	(Madagascar)	(Botswana)
1	Ivory Coast	6	3	3	0	10	2	+8	12	Third round	—	1–0	3–0	4–0
2	Mozambique	6	2	2	2	7	5	+2	8	Third round	1–1	—	3–0	1–2
3	Madagascar	6	1	3	2	2	7	−5	6		0–0	1–1	—	1–0
4	Botswana	6	1	2	3	3	8	−5	5		1–1	0–1	0–0	—

31 May 2008
15:00 UTC+2

Botswana	0–0	Madagascar
	Report

Botswana National Stadium, Gaborone
Attendance: 11,087
Referee: Wellington Kaoma (Zambia)
1 June 2008
16:00 UTC+0

Ivory Coast	1–0	Mozambique
Cissé 75'	Report

Stade Félix Houphouët-Boigny, Abidjan
Attendance: 20,000
Referee: Ahmed Auda (Egypt)

8 June 2008
14:30 UTC+3

Madagascar	0–0	Ivory Coast
	Report

Mahamasina Municipal Stadium, Antananarivo
Attendance: 15,000
Referee: Jean-Claude Labrosse (Seychelles)
8 June 2008
15:00 UTC+2

Mozambique	1–2	Botswana
Lobo 60'	Report	Selolwane 20'; Mafoko 80'

Estádio da Machava, Maputo
Attendance: 30,000
Referee: Mbongseni Fakudze (Swaziland)

14 June 2008
15:00 UTC+2

Botswana	1–1	Ivory Coast
Selolwane 25'	Report	Akalé 64'

Botswana National Stadium, Gaborone
Attendance: 21,400
Referee: Muhmed Ssegonga (Uganda)
15 June 2008
14:30 UTC+3

Madagascar	1–1	Mozambique
Mamihasindrahona 90'	Report	Dário 33'

Mahamasina Municipal Stadium, Antananarivo
Attendance: 15,501
Referee: Abdul Basit Ebrahim (South Africa)

22 June 2008
15:00 UTC+2

Mozambique	3–0	Madagascar
Tico-Tico 23'; Carlitos 62'; Domingues 63'	Report

Estádio da Machava, Maputo
Attendance: 20,000
Referee: Eddy Maillet (Seychelles)
22 June 2008
16:00 UTC+0

Ivory Coast	4–0	Botswana
Sanogo 16'; Zokora 21'; Cissé 46', 70'	Report

Stade Félix Houphouët-Boigny, Abidjan
Attendance: 15,000
Referee: Kacem Bennaceur (Tunisia)

7 September 2008
14:30 UTC+3

Madagascar	1–0	Botswana
Rabemananjara 18'	Report

Mahamasina Municipal Stadium, Antananarivo
Attendance: 20,000
Referee: Rajindraparsad Seechurn (Mauritius)
7 September 2008
15:00 UTC+2

Mozambique	1–1	Ivory Coast
Miro 52'	Report	B. Koné 48'

Estádio da Machava, Maputo
Attendance: 35,000
Referee: Abdellah El Achiri (Morocco)

11 October 2008
16:30 UTC+2

Botswana	0–1	Mozambique
	Report	Genito 6'

Botswana National Stadium, Gaborone
Attendance: 2,000
Referee: Cheikh Ahmed Tidane Seck (Senegal)
11 October 2008
14:30 UTC+0

Ivory Coast	3–0	Madagascar
Sanogo 42', 55'; Kalou 66' (pen.)	Report

Stade Félix Houphouët-Boigny, Abidjan
Attendance: 24,000
Referee: Mohamed Benouza (Algeria)

=== Group 8 ===
Pos	Team	Pld	W	D	L	GF	GA	GD	Pts	Qualification	(Morocco)	(Rwanda)	(Mauritania)	(Ethiopia)
1	Morocco	4	3	0	1	11	5	+6	9	Third round	—	2–0	4–1	~~3–0~~
2	Rwanda	4	3	0	1	7	3	+4	9	Third round	3–1	—	3–0	~~Canc.~~
3	Mauritania	4	0	0	4	2	12	−10	0		1–4	0–1	—	~~0–1~~
4	Ethiopia (Note: Ethiopia were excluded from the competition due to FIFA's suspension of the Ethiopian Football Federation on 29 July 2008, and the results of their matches were annulled.)	0	0	0	0	0	0	0	0	Suspended	~~Canc.~~	~~1–2~~	~~6–1~~	—

Notes:
31 May 2008
15:30 UTC+2

Rwanda	3–0	Mauritania
Karekezi 15'; Makasi 60' (pen.); Bokota 75'	Report

Stade Régional Nyamirambo, Kigali
Attendance: 12,000
Referee: Noumandiez Doué (Ivory Coast)
31 May 2008
19:00 UTC+0

Morocco	Annulled (Note: Ethiopia were excluded from the competition due to FIFA's suspension of the Ethiopian Football Federation on 29 July 2008, and the results of their matches were annulled.) (3–0)	Ethiopia
Benjelloun 4'; Aboucherouane 12'; Kharja 86'	Report

Stade Mohammed V, Casablanca
Attendance: 5,000
Referee: Badara Diatta (Senegal)

7 June 2008
17:00 UTC+0

Mauritania	1–4	Morocco
Da Silva 82' (pen.)	Report	Sektioui 8'; Benjelloun 36'; Safri 59'; Kharja 79'

Stade Nacional, Nouakchott
Attendance: 9,500
Referee: Joseph Lamptey (Ghana)
8 June 2008
16:00 UTC+3

Ethiopia	Annulled (1–2)	Rwanda
Tafese 47'	Report	Makasi 66', 89'

Addis Ababa Stadium, Addis Ababa
Attendance: 18,000
Referee: Alfred Ndinya (Kenya)

13 June 2008
17:00 UTC+0

Mauritania	Annulled (0–1)	Ethiopia
	Report	Saladin 90+2'

Stade Nacional, Nouakchott
Attendance: 5,000
Referee: Jamel Ambaya (Libya)
14 June 2008
15:30 UTC+2

Rwanda	3–1	Morocco
Makasi 14'; Bokota 58'; Karekezi 90'	Report	Safri 80'

Stade Régional Nyamirambo, Kigali
Attendance: 12,000
Referee: Divine Evehe (Cameroon)

21 June 2008
19:00 UTC+1

Morocco	2–0	Rwanda
Safri 11' (pen.); El Zhar 49'	Report

Stade Mohammed V, Casablanca
Attendance: 2,500
Referee: Mohamed Benouza (Algeria)
22 June 2008
16:00 UTC+3

Ethiopia	Annulled (6–1)	Mauritania
Tefera 41' (pen.), 89'; Nigussie 55', 63'; Mesud 83'; Adane 90'	Report	Ely 44'

Addis Ababa Stadium, Addis Ababa
Attendance: 3,000
Referee: Verson Lwanja (Malawi)

6 September 2008
17:00 UTC+0

Mauritania	0–1	Rwanda
	Report	Bobo 81'

Stade Nacional, Nouakchott
Attendance: 1,000
Referee: Kacem Bennaceur (Tunisia)
7 September 2008
16:00 UTC+3

Ethiopia	Cancelled	Morocco

Addis Ababa Stadium, Addis Ababa

11 October 2008
15:30 UTC+2

Rwanda	Cancelled	Ethiopia

Stade Amahoro, Kigali
11 October 2008
19:30 UTC+0

Morocco	4–1	Mauritania
Safri 35' (pen.); Hadji 56', 60'; Zemmama 66'	Report	Teguedi 68'

Stade Moulay Abdellah, Rabat
Attendance: 1,472
Referee: Sharaf Aboubacar (Ivory Coast)

=== Group 9 ===
Pos	Team	Pld	W	D	L	GF	GA	GD	Pts	Qualification	(Burkina Faso)	(Tunisia)	(Burundi)	(Seychelles)
1	Burkina Faso	6	5	1	0	14	5	+9	16	Third round	—	0–0	2–0	4–1
2	Tunisia	6	4	1	1	11	3	+8	13	Third round	1–2	—	2–1	5–0
3	Burundi	6	2	0	4	5	9	−4	6		1–3	0–1	—	1–0
4	Seychelles	6	0	0	6	4	17	−13	0		2–3	0–2	1–2	—

1 June 2008
15:30 UTC+2

Burundi	1–0	Seychelles
S. Ndikumana 81'	Report

Prince Louis Rwagasore Stadium, Bujumbura
Attendance: 4,000
Referee: Emmanuel Imiere (Nigeria)
1 June 2008
19:10 UTC+2

Tunisia	1–2	Burkina Faso
Belaid 38'	Report	Koné 85', 87'

Stade 7 November, Tunis
Attendance: 15,000
Referee: Jamel Ambaya (Libya)

7 June 2008
16:30 UTC+4

Seychelles	0–2	Tunisia
	Report	Jemâa 10'; Ben Saada 43'

Stade Linité, Victoria
Attendance: 2,033
Referee: Justino Faduco (Mozambique)
7 June 2008
18:00 UTC+0

Burkina Faso	2–0	Burundi
Dagano 25', 47'	Report

Stade du 4 Août, Ouagadougou
Attendance: 10,000
Referee: Gil Ndume (Gabon)

14 June 2008
16:30 UTC+4

Seychelles	2–3	Burkina Faso
Zialor 46'; Annacoura 52'	Report	Dagano 26', 55', 78'

Stade Linité, Victoria
Attendance: 1,000
Referee: Rajindraparsad Seechurn (Mauritius)
15 June 2008
15:00 UTC+2

Burundi	0–1	Tunisia
	Report	Jaïdi 66'

Prince Louis Rwagasore Stadium, Bujumbura
Attendance: 7,000
Referee: Jerome Damon (South Africa)

21 June 2008
18:00 UTC+0

Burkina Faso	4–1	Seychelles
Kaboré 20'; Kéré 29', 64'; Koné 89'	Report	St. Ange 44'

Stade du 4 Août, Ouagadougou
Attendance: 12,500
Referee: Joseph Lamptey (Ghana)
21 June 2008
20:30 UTC+2

Tunisia	2–1	Burundi
Ben Saada 30' (pen.); Jemâa 44'	Report	Mbazumutima 45'

Stade 7 November, Tunis
Attendance: 6,000
Referee: Yasser Abn el Raaof Younis (Egypt)

6 September 2008
16:30 UTC+4

Seychelles	1–2	Burundi
Zialor 63'	Report	Mbazumutima 27'; Nahimana 64'

Stade Linité, Victoria
Attendance: 3,000
Referee: Kokou Djaoupe (Togo)
6 September 2008
18:00 UTC+0

Burkina Faso	0–0	Tunisia
	Report

Stade du 4 Août, Ouagadougou
Attendance: 10,000
Referee: Mathews Katjimune (Namibia)

11 October 2008
17:00 UTC+2

Tunisia	5–0	Seychelles
Essifi 5', 68'; Mikari 18'; Ben Frej 20'; Ben Khalfallah 43'	Report

Stade 7 November, Tunis
Attendance: 10,000
Referee: Badara Diatta (Senegal)
12 October 2008
15:30 UTC+2

Burundi	1–3	Burkina Faso
Nahimana 43'	Report	Bancé 18'; Dagano 54', 76'

Prince Louis Rwagasore Stadium, Bujumbura
Attendance: 10,000
Referee: Muhmed Ssegonga (Uganda)

=== Group 10 ===
Pos	Team	Pld	W	D	L	GF	GA	GD	Pts	Qualification	(Mali)	(Sudan)	(Republic of the Congo)	(Chad)
1	Mali	6	4	0	2	13	8	+5	12	Third round	—	3–0	4–2	2–1
2	Sudan	6	3	0	3	9	9	0	9	Third round	3–2	—	2–0	1–2
3	Congo	6	3	0	3	7	8	−1	9		1–0	1–0	—	2–0
4	Chad	6	2	0	4	7	11	−4	6		1–2	1–3	2–1	—

1 June 2008
18:00 UTC+0

Mali	4–2	Congo
S. Keita 2', 61'; A. Coulibaly 32'; S. Coulibaly 42'	Report	Mouithys 5', 75'

Stade 26 mars, Bamako
Attendance: 40,000
Referee: Kacem Bennaceur (Tunisia)

7 June 2008
16:00 UTC+1

Chad	1–2	Mali
Kedigui 43'	Report	Kanouté 5', 21' (pen.)

Stade Nacional, N'Djamena
Attendance: 15,000
Referee: Crespin Aguidissou (Benin)
8 June 2008
15:30 UTC+1

Congo	1–0	Sudan
Endzanga 60'	Report

Stade Alphonse Massemba-Débat, Brazzaville
Attendance: 25,000
Referee: Sule Mana (Nigeria)

14 June 2008
16:00 UTC+1

Chad	2–1	Congo
Kedigui 40'; Djerabe 47'	Report	Batota 30'

Stade Nacional, N'Djamena
Attendance: 8,000
Referee: Noumandiez Doué (Ivory Coast)
14 June 2008
20:00 UTC+3

Sudan	3–2	Mali
Ala'a Eldin 45'; Muhannad 72' (pen.); Tambal 80'	Report	Kanouté 69', 90'

Khartoum Stadium, Khartoum
Attendance: 15,000
Referee: Essam Abdel-Fatah (Egypt)

22 June 2008
15:30 UTC+1

Congo	2–0	Chad
Minga 13'; Ibara 67'	Report

Stade Alphonse Massemba-Débat, Brazzaville
Attendance: 8,000
Referee: Abdou Diouf (Senegal)
22 June 2008
18:00 UTC+0

Mali	3–0	Sudan
Kanouté 25'; S. Keita 60', 67'	Report

Stade 26 mars, Bamako
Attendance: 25,000
Referee: Noumandiez Doué (Ivory Coast)

6 September 2008
22:00 UTC+2
(Note: The Sudan v Chad match was originally scheduled for 31 May 2008, but postponed due to conflict between Sudan and Chad. Both legs between Sudan and Chad were later rescheduled and moved to Egypt.)

Sudan	1–2	Chad
Tambal 77'	Report	Mbaiam 28'; Hassan 82'

Cairo Military Academy Stadium, Cairo (Egypt)
Attendance: 4,000
Referee: Mohamed Benouza (Algeria)
7 September 2008
15:30 UTC+1

Congo	1–0	Mali
Endzanga 87'	Report

Stade Alphonse Massemba-Débat, Brazzaville
Attendance: 16,000
Referee: Djamel Haimoudi (Algeria)

10 September 2008
22:00 UTC+2

Chad	1–3	Sudan
Djime 34'	Report	Ahmed Aadil 4'; Agab 48' (pen.); Saif Eldin 76'

Cairo Military Academy Stadium, Cairo (Egypt)
Attendance: 10,000
Referee: Badara Diatta (Senegal)

11 October 2008
18:00 UTC+0

Mali	2–1	Chad
S. Y. Keita 44', 83'	Report	Djime 75'

Stade 26 mars, Bamako
Attendance: 40,000
Referee: Yakhouba Keita (Guinea)
11 October 2008
21:00 UTC+3

Sudan	2–0	Congo
Muhannad 31'; Agab 74'	Report

Al-Merrikh Stadium, Omdurman
Attendance: 27,000
Referee: Jamel Ambaya (Libya)

=== Group 11 ===
Pos	Team	Pld	W	D	L	GF	GA	GD	Pts	Qualification	(Zambia)	(Togo)	(Eswatini)	(Eritrea)
1	Zambia	4	2	1	1	2	1	+1	7	Third round	—	1–0	1–0	Canc.
2	Togo	4	2	0	2	8	3	+5	6	Third round	1–0	—	6–0	Canc.
3	Swaziland	4	1	1	2	2	8	−6	4		0–0	2–1	—	Canc.
4	Eritrea (Note: Eritrea withdrew from the qualifiers on 25 March 2008 and were not replaced.)	0	0	0	0	0	0	0	0	Suspended	Canc.	Canc.	Canc.	—

Notes:
31 May 2008
15:30 UTC+0

Togo	1–0	Zambia
Olufadé 16'	Report

Ohene Djan Stadium, Accra (Ghana) (Note: Togo were barred from hosting qualifiers due to violence during their 2008 African Cup of Nations qualifier against Mali.)
Attendance: 15,000
Referee: Lassina Pare (Burkina Faso)

8 June 2008
15:00 UTC+2

Swaziland	2–1	Togo
Dlamini 55'; Salelwako 72'	Report	Olufadé 88'

Somhlolo National Stadium, Lobamba
Attendance: 5,819
Referee: Jean-Claude Niyongabo (Burundi)

15 June 2008
15:00 UTC+2

Swaziland	0–0	Zambia
	Report

Somhlolo National Stadium, Lobamba
Attendance: 7,462
Referee: Alex Kotey (Ghana)

21 June 2008
14:00 UTC+2

Zambia	1–0	Swaziland
C. Katongo 85' (pen.)	Report

Konkola Stadium, Chililabombwe
Attendance: 14,458
Referee: Kenias Marange (Zimbabwe)

10 September 2008
14:00 UTC+2
(Note: Match originally scheduled for 6 September 2008 postponed at the request of Zambia for mourning the death of President Levy Mwanawasa.)

Zambia	1–0	Togo
F. Katongo 31'	Report

Konkola Stadium, Chililabombwe
Attendance: 10,500
Referee: Jerome Damon (South Africa)

11 October 2008
15:30 UTC+0

Togo	6–0	Swaziland
Salifou 16'; Adebayor 29', 46', 71', 85'; Olufadé 45'	Report

Ohene Djan Stadium, Accra (Ghana)
Attendance: 8,000
Referee: Divine Evehe (Cameroon)

=== Group 12 ===
Pos	Team	Pld	W	D	L	GF	GA	GD	Pts	Qualification	(Egypt)	(Malawi)	(Democratic Republic of the Congo)	(Djibouti)
1	Egypt	6	5	0	1	13	2	+11	15	Third round	—	2–0	2–1	4–0
2	Malawi	6	4	0	2	14	5	+9	12	Third round	1–0	—	2–1	8–1
3	DR Congo	6	3	0	3	14	6	+8	9		0–1	1–0	—	5–1
4	Djibouti	6	0	0	6	2	30	−28	0		0–4	0–3	0–6	—

31 May 2008
14:30 UTC+2

Malawi	8–1	Djibouti
Kafoteka 3'; Kanyenda 19', 46', 48'; Kamwendo 66'; Chavula 72'; Ng'ambi 78'; Mkandawire 83'	Report	Daher 23'

Kamuzu Stadium, Blantyre
Attendance: 35,000
Referee: Mathews Katjimune (Namibia)
1 June 2008
21:00 UTC+3

Egypt	2–1	DR Congo
Zaky 67'; Eid 80'	Report	Ilunga 44'

Cairo International Stadium, Cairo
Attendance: 40,000
Referee: Rajindraparsad Seechurn (Mauritius)

6 June 2008
15:00 UTC+3

Djibouti	0–4	Egypt
	Report	Zaky 40'; Hosny 47' (pen.); Hassan 54'; Eid 65'

El Hadj Hassan Gouled, Djibouti
Attendance: 6,000
Referee: Amanuel Eyob (Eritrea)
8 June 2008
15:30 UTC+1

DR Congo	1–0	Malawi
Matumona 75' (pen.)	Report

Stade des Martyrs, Kinshasa
Attendance: 35,000
Referee: Badr Abdel Gadir (Sudan)

13 June 2008
15:00 UTC+3

Djibouti	0–6	DR Congo
	Report	Mbokani 25', 48'; Nonda 31'; Matumona 40', 49'; Mputu 79'

El Hadj Hassan Gouled, Djibouti
Attendance: 3,000
Referee: Thapelo Disang (Botswana)
14 June 2008
14:30 UTC+2

Malawi	1–0	Egypt
Msowoya 90+3'	Report

Kamuzu Stadium, Blantyre
Attendance: 40,000
Referee: Yakhouba Keita (Guinea)

22 June 2008
15:30 UTC+1

DR Congo	5–1	Djibouti
Nonda 10', 45+2', 52'; Tshinyama 59'; Mbokani 63'	Report	Hirir 85'

Stade des Martyrs, Kinshasa
Attendance: 15,000
Referee: Khalil Rouaissi (Morocco)
22 June 2008
21:00 UTC+3

Egypt	2–0	Malawi
Moteab 17', 50'	Report

Cairo International Stadium, Cairo
Attendance: 20,000
Referee: Badara Diatta (Senegal)

5 September 2008
21:00 UTC+3

Djibouti	0–3	Malawi
	Report	Msowoya 45'; Chavula 60'; Nyondo 70'

El Hadj Hassan Gouled, Djibouti
Attendance: 700
Referee: Hélder Martins de Carvalho (Angola)
7 September 2008
15:30 UTC+1

DR Congo	0–1	Egypt
	Report	Aboutrika 30'

Stade des Martyrs, Kinshasa
Attendance: 80,000
Referee: Daniel Bennett (South Africa)

11 October 2008
14:30 UTC+2

Malawi	2–1	DR Congo
Ng'ambi 55'; Msowoya 82'	Report	LuaLua 12'

Kamuzu Stadium, Blantyre
Attendance: 50,000
Referee: Coffi Codjia (Benin)
12 October 2008
20:00 UTC+2

Egypt	4–0	Djibouti
Emad Moteab 19'; Hassan 50'; Aboutrika 66'; Riyad 90+2' (o.g.)	Report

Cairo Military Academy Stadium, Cairo
Attendance: 10,000
Referee: Lassina Pare (Burkina Faso)

== Rankings of runners-up ==
Along with the 12 group winners, the 8 best runners-up also advanced to the third round. In determining the rankings of the runners-up, results against the fourth-placed team (for groups with 4 teams) would be excluded (and are hence excluded from the table below).

Pos	Grp	Team	Pld	W	D	L	GF	GA	GD	Pts	Qualification
1	8	Rwanda	4	3	0	1	7	3	+4	9	Third round
2	2	Kenya	4	2	1	1	6	3	+3	7	Third round
3	9	Tunisia	4	2	1	1	4	3	+1	7	Third round
4	11	Togo	4	2	0	2	8	3	+5	6	Third round
5	5	Gabon	4	2	0	2	3	3	0	6	Third round
6	10	Sudan	4	2	0	2	5	6	−1	6	Third round
7	12	Malawi	4	2	0	2	3	4	−1	6	Third round
8	7	Mozambique	4	1	2	1	5	3	+2	5	Third round
9	6	Gambia	4	1	2	1	2	2	0	5	
10	3	Angola	4	1	1	2	6	6	0	4	
11	1	Cape Verde	4	1	0	3	3	7	−4	3	
12	4	South Africa	4	0	1	3	0	4	−4	1	

== Goalscorers ==
There were 356 goals scored in 136 matches, for an average of 2.62 goals per match.

7 goals

- (Burkina Faso) Moumouni Dagano

6 goals

- (Benin) Razak Omotoyossi
- (Cameroon) Samuel Eto'o

5 goals

- (Guinea) Ismaël Bangoura
- (Mali) Frédéric Kanouté

4 goals

- (Democratic Republic of the Congo) Shabani Nonda
- (Ghana) Junior Agogo
- (Kenya) Dennis Oliech
- (Mali) Seydou Keita
- (Morocco) Youssef Safri
- (Rwanda) Saïd Makasi
- (Togo) Emmanuel Adebayor

3 goals

- (Angola) Flávio Amado
- (Burkina Faso) Yssouf Koné
- (Cape Verde) Dady
- (Democratic Republic of the Congo) Zola Matumona
- (Democratic Republic of the Congo) Dieumerci Mbokani
- (Egypt) Emad Moteab
- (Ivory Coast) Sekou Cissé
- (Ivory Coast) Boubacar Sanogo
- (Malawi) Essau Kanyenda
- (Malawi) Chiukepo Msowoya
- (Namibia) Wilko Risser
- (Nigeria) Ikechukwu Uche
- (Tanzania) Jerson Tegete
- (Togo) Adékamni Olufadé

2 goals

- (Algeria) Antar Yahia
- (Algeria) Karim Ziani
- (Botswana) Diphetogo Selolwane
- (Burkina Faso) Mahamoudou Kéré
- (Burundi) Henri Mbazumutima
- (Burundi) Claude Nahimana
- (Cameroon) Albert Meyong Ze
- (Chad) Léger Djimrangar
- (Chad) Hilaire Kédigui
- (Republic of the Congo) Wilfried Urbain Elvis Endzanga
- (Republic of the Congo) Lys Mouithys
- (Egypt) Mohamed Aboutrika
- (Egypt) Ahmed Eid Abdel Malek
- (Egypt) Ahmed Hassan
- (Egypt) Amr Zaky
- (Ethiopia) Andualem Nigussie
- (Ethiopia) Fikru Tefera
- (Gabon) Fabrice Do Marcolino
- (Gabon) Bruno Zita Mbanangoyé
- (Gabon) Roguy Méyé
- (The Gambia) Njogu Demba-Nyrén
- (The Gambia) Tijan Jaiteh
- (Ghana) Laryea Kingston
- (Ghana) Prince Tagoe
- (Guinea) Pascal Feindouno
- (Liberia) Olivier Makor
- (Malawi) Moses Chavula
- (Malawi) Robert Ng'ambi
- (Mali) Sidi Yaya Keita
- (Mauritius) Wesley Marquette
- (Morocco) Abdessalam Benjelloun
- (Morocco) Youssef Hadji
- (Morocco) Houssine Kharja
- (Namibia) Rudolph Bester
- (Niger) Alhassane Issoufou
- (Nigeria) Joseph Yobo
- (Rwanda) Labama Bokota
- (Rwanda) Olivier Karekezi
- (Senegal) El Hadji Diouf
- (Senegal) Cheikh Gueye
- (Seychelles) Philip Zialor
- (South Africa) Kagiso Dikgacoi
- (Sudan) Faisal Agab
- (Sudan) Muhannad El Tahir
- (Sudan) Haytham Tambal
- (Eswatini) Siza Dlamini
- (Eswatini) Collen Salelwako
- (Tanzania) Danny Mrwanda
- (Tunisia) Chaouki Ben Saada
- (Tunisia) Hichem Essifi
- (Tunisia) Issam Jemâa
- (Uganda) Geofrey Massa
- (Uganda) Eugene Sseppuya
- (Zimbabwe) Gilbert Mushangazhike

1 goal

- (Algeria) Rafik Djebbour
- (Algeria) Rafik Saïfi
- (Angola) Yamba Asha
- (Angola) Ricardo Job Estévão
- (Angola) Gilberto
- (Angola) Zé Kalanga
- (Angola) Locó
- (Angola) Mantorras
- (Angola) António Mendonça
- (Benin) Khaled Adénon
- (Benin) Jocelyn Ahouéya
- (Benin) Stéphane Sessègnon
- (Benin) Oumar Tchomogo
- (Benin) Séïdath Tchomogo
- (Botswana) Boitumelo Mafoko
- (Burkina Faso) Aristide Bancé
- (Burkina Faso) Charles Kaboré
- (Burundi) Selemani Ndikumana
- (Cameroon) Gustave Bebbe
- (Cameroon) André Bikey
- (Cameroon) Achille Emaná
- (Cameroon) Jean Makoun
- (Cameroon) Rigobert Song
- (Cameroon) Somen Tchoyi
- (Cape Verde) Babanco
- (Cape Verde) Lito
- (Cape Verde) José Semedo
- (Cape Verde) Marco Soares
- (Chad) Armand Djerabe
- (Chad) Syriakata Hassan
- (Chad) Marius Mbaiam
- (Republic of the Congo) Gervais Batota
- (Republic of the Congo) Franchel Ibara
- (Republic of the Congo) Edson Minga
- (Democratic Republic of the Congo) Hérita Ilunga
- (Democratic Republic of the Congo) Lomana LuaLua
- (Democratic Republic of the Congo) Tresor Mputu
- (Democratic Republic of the Congo) Tsholola Tshinyama
- (Djibouti) Ahmed Daher
- (Djibouti) Moussa Hirir
- (Egypt) Hosny Abd Rabo
- (Ethiopia) Adane Girma
- (Ethiopia) Mesud Mohammed
- (Ethiopia) Saladin Said
- (Ethiopia) Tesfaye Tafese
- (Equatorial Guinea) Rodolfo Bodipo
- (Equatorial Guinea) Juvenal Edjogo Owono
- (Equatorial Guinea) Juan Ramón Epitié
- (Equatorial Guinea) Ronan Carolino Falcão
- (Gabon) Bruno Ecuele Manga
- (Gabon) Stéphane N'Guéma
- (The Gambia) Ousman Jallow
- (The Gambia) Mustapha Jarju
- (Ghana) Matthew Amoah
- (Ghana) Stephen Appiah
- (Ghana) Sulley Muntari
- (Guinea) Mamadou Bah
- (Guinea) Kamil Zayatte
- (Ivory Coast) Kanga Akalé
- (Ivory Coast) Salomon Kalou
- (Ivory Coast) Bakari Koné
- (Ivory Coast) Didier Zokora
- (Kenya) Mohammed Jamal
- (Kenya) Austin Makacha
- (Kenya) McDonald Mariga
- (Kenya) Francis Ouma
- (Lesotho) Lehlohonolo Seema
- (Lesotho) Sello Muso
- (Liberia) Zah Rahan Krangar
- (Liberia) Dioh Williams
- (Libya) Osama Al Fazzani
- (Libya) Younes Al Shibani
- (Libya) Omar Daoud
- (Libya) Ahmed Saad Osman
- (Libya) Hesham Shaban
- (Madagascar) Guy Mamihasindrahona
- (Madagascar) Stephan Rabemananjara
- (Malawi) Elvis Kafoteka
- (Malawi) Joseph Kamwendo
- (Malawi) Noel Mkandawire
- (Malawi) Atusaye Nyondo
- (Mali) Adama Coulibaly
- (Mali) Soumaila Coulibaly
- (Mauritania) Dominique Da Silva
- (Mauritania) Ely Cheikh Voulany
- (Mauritania) Dahmed Ould Teguedi
- (Mauritius) Andy Sophie
- (Morocco) Hicham Aboucherouane
- (Morocco) Nabil El Zhar
- (Morocco) Tarik Sektioui
- (Morocco) Merouane Zemmama
- (Mozambique) Eugénio Fernando Bila
- (Mozambique) Carlitos
- (Mozambique) Domingues
- (Mozambique) Almiro Lobo
- (Mozambique) Miro
- (Mozambique) Dário Monteiro
- (Mozambique) Tico-Tico
- (Namibia) Costa Khaiseb
- (Namibia) Paulus Shipanga
- (Niger) Ismaël Alassane
- (Niger) Daouda Kamilou
- (Niger) Moussa Mallam
- (Nigeria) Yakubu
- (Nigeria) Obinna Nwaneri
- (Nigeria) Christian Obodo
- (Nigeria) Peter Odemwingie
- (Nigeria) Chidi Odiah
- (Rwanda) Bobo Bola
- (Senegal) Henri Camara
- (Senegal) Salif Diao
- (Senegal) Abdoulaye Faye
- (Senegal) Kader Mangane
- (Senegal) Ibrahima Sonko
- (Seychelles) Don Annacoura
- (Seychelles) Bertrand St. Ange
- (Sierra Leone) Kewullay Conteh
- (Sierra Leone) Mohammed Kallon
- (Sierra Leone) Sheriff Suma
- (South Africa) Thembinkosi Fanteni
- (South Africa) Surprise Moriri
- (South Africa) Siphiwe Tshabalala
- (Sudan) Ahmed Aadil
- (Sudan) Saif Eldin Ali Idris Farah
- (Sudan) Ala'a Eldin Yousif
- (Tanzania) Athuman Iddy
- (Tanzania) Nizar Khalfan
- (Tanzania) Khalfan Ngassa
- (Tanzania) Shadrack Nsajigwa
- (Togo) Moustapha Salifou
- (Tunisia) Tijani Belaid
- (Tunisia) Saber Ben Frej
- (Tunisia) Fahid Ben Khalfallah
- (Tunisia) Radhi Jaïdi
- (Tunisia) Yassin Mikari
- (Uganda) Timothy Batabaire
- (Uganda) David Obua
- (Uganda) Ibrahim Sekagya
- (Uganda) Dan Wagaluka
- (Zambia) Christopher Katongo
- (Zambia) Felix Katongo
- (Zimbabwe) Cuthbert Malajila
- (Zimbabwe) Esrom Nyandoro

1 own goal

- (Djibouti) Said Riyad (against Egypt)
- (Gabon) Bruno Ecuele Manga (against Libya)
- (Niger) Pascal Anicet (against Benin)
- (Niger) Kassaly Daouda (against Angola)
- (Nigeria) Joseph Yobo (against Sierra Leone)
- (Senegal) Cheikh Gueye (against Algeria)
