= Tanzania national football team results =

The following are the matches played by the Tanzania national football team since its debut in 1945.

== 1960s ==
=== 1969 ===
16 February 1969	Kenya	0–1	Tanzania	Nairobi City Stadium, Nairobi
			Choteka 40'

1 March 1969	Tanzania	1–1	Kenya	Dar es Salaam
	Goal		Molo 70'

25 May 1969	Ethiopia	7–0	Tanzania	Addis Ababa
	Vassalo 19'; Asmerom 24', 51', 83'; Tewolde 25'; Abdo 70'; Asfaw 80'

31 May 1969	Tanzania	1–2	Ethiopia	Dar es Salaam
	Zimbwe		Vassalo; Tewolde

== 1970s ==
=== 1970 ===
17 October 1970	Tanzania	1–1	Zambia	Dar es Salaam

1 November 1970	Zambia	5–1	Tanzania	Lusaka
	Chitalu; Chama; M'hango; Stephenson		?

=== 1972 ===
25 November 1972	Tanzania	1 – 1	Ethiopia	Dar es Salaam, Tanzania
	Mashoto 58'		Gebremedhin 30'	Stadium: Tanzania National Stadium; Attendance: 14,255; Referee: Alfred John Olimba (Kenya)

3 December 1972	Ethiopia	0 – 0	Tanzania	Addis Ababa, Ethiopia
				Stadium: Haile Selassie Stadium; Attendance: 19,430; Referee: Abdel Rahman El-Khider Ali (Sudan)

10 December 1972	Ethiopia	3 – 0	Tanzania	Addis Ababa, Ethiopia
	Ingdawerk 5', 12'; Tesfaye 44'			Stadium: Haile Selassie Stadium; Attendance: 7,201; Referee: Ahmed Gindil Saleh (Sudan)

=== 1973 ===
8 April 1973	Ethiopia	2–1	Tanzania	Addis Ababa

22 April 1973	Tanzania	3–0	Ethiopia	Dar es Salaam

27 May 1973	Tanzania	1–1	Mauritius	Dar es Salaam

14 June 1973	Mauritius	0–0 (4–3 p)	Tanzania	Port Louis

25 September 1973	Tanzania	1–0	Zanzibar

27 September 1973	Tanzania	2–1	Kenya

29 September 1973	Uganda	2–1	Tanzania

=== 1974 ===
Tanzania	0–0	Kenya

Tanzania	1–0	Zambia

Tanzania	1–1 (5–3 p)	Uganda

=== 1975 ===
5 July 1975	Tanzania	1–1	Egypt	Dar es Salaam
	Goal		Nour

1 August 1975	Egypt	5–2	Tanzania	Cairo
	Gaafar 33'; O. Khalil 40', 74'; Nour 71', 72'		Goal

1 November 1975	Malawi	3–1	Tanzania
	Phiri		Goal

5 November 1975	Tanzania	4–0	Zanzibar

7 November 1975	Kenya	3–2	Tanzania
	Lukoye; Thigo		Goal

=== 1976 ===
6 November 1976	Kenya	1–1	Tanzania	Amaan Stadium, Zanzibar City
	Osoro 18'		Greyson 47'

7 November 1976	Tanzania	1–1	Malawi	Amaan Stadium, Zanzibar City
	Kibadeni 38'		Chikafa 1'

=== 1977 ===
27 November 1977	Zambia	4–2	Tanzania	Mogadishu Stadium, Mogadishu
	Chola ? ?

1 December 1977	Malawi	0–0	Tanzania	Mogadishu Stadium, Mogadishu

=== 1979 ===
16 April 1979	Mauritius	3–2	Tanzania	Stade George V, Curepipe
	Maurel; L'Enflé; Ramrekha

29 April 1979	Tanzania	4–0	Mauritius	Dar es Salaam

11 August 1979	Tanzania	1–0	Zambia	Dar es Salaam

26 August 1979	Zambia	1–1	Tanzania	Ndola
	Chola 43'		Tino 84'

3 November 1979	Kenya	0–0	Tanzania

6 November 1979	Zambia	2–2	Tanzania
	Chitalu; Chola		Goal

9 November 1979	Tanzania	5–3	Uganda

13 November 1979	Malawi	1–1	Tanzania
	Gondwe

14 November 1979	Malawi	0–0 (Replay)	Tanzania

16 November 1979	Tanzania	2–1	Zanzibar	Mombasa

== 1980s ==
=== 1980 ===
8 March 1980	Nigeria	3–1	Tanzania	Surulere Stadium, Lagos
	Lawal 11'; Onyedika 35'; Odegbami 85'	Report	Mkambi 54'	Attendance: 80,000; Referee: Suleiman El Naim (Sudan)

12 March 1980	Egypt	2–1	Tanzania	Surulere Stadium, Lagos
	Shehata 32'; Nour 38'	Report	Waziri 86'	Attendance: 55,000; Referee: Sohan Ramlochun (Mauritius)

15 March 1980	Ivory Coast	1–1	Tanzania	Surulere Stadium, Lagos
	Koma 7'	Report	Waziri 59'	Attendance: 70,000; Referee: Diallo Bakaï (Cameroon)

5 July 1980	Kenya	3–1	Tanzania	Nairobi, Kenya
	Adero 30'; Owino 57', 80' (pen.)		Ali	Stadium: Nairobi City Stadium; Attendance: 8,650; Referee: Babiker El-Bedawi (Sudan)

19 July 1980	Tanzania	5–0	Kenya	Dar es Salaam, Tanzania
	Tino 44', 70'; Rishard 70'; Ali 72', 80'			Stadium: William Mkapa Stadium; Attendance: 155,940; Referee: Winston Gumboh (Zambia)

14 November 1980	Sudan	0–1	Tanzania	Khartoum

17 November 1980	Tanzania	1–1	Somalia	Khartoum

24 November 1980	Tanzania	1–0	Malawi

28 November 1980	Sudan	1–0	Tanzania
	Ebrahim 67'

6 December 1980	Nigeria	1–1	Tanzania	Lagos, Nigeria
	Lawal 29'		Salim 85'	Stadium: Surulere Stadium; Attendance: 170,000; Referee: Mohamed Larache (Morocco)

20 December 1980	Tanzania	0–2	Nigeria	Dar es Salaam, Tanzania
			Chiedozie 5'; M'Wokozhi 79'	Stadium: William Mkapa Stadium; Attendance: 130,000; Referee: Hussein Fahmy Bahig (Egypt)

=== 1981 ===
15 November 1981	Tanzania	3–1	Zanzibar

17 November 1981	Tanzania	2–2	Malawi
			Gondwe ?

20 November 1981	Tanzania	1–0	Kenya

24 November 1981	Tanzania	2–1	Zambia

28 November 1981	Kenya	1–0	Tanzania
	Omah 22'			Attendance: 40,000

=== 1982 ===
12 September 1982	Tanzania	1–1	Uganda	Dar es Salaam

26 September 1982	Uganda	3–2	Tanzania	Kampala

14 November 1982	Tanzania	0–3	Zimbabwe

17 November 1982	Uganda	1–0	Tanzania

19 November 1982	Malawi	2–0	Tanzania
	Billie; Dandize

=== 1983 ===
13 November 1983	Tanzania	1–1	Ethiopia

16 November 1983	Tanzania	0–1	Sudan
			Mustafa

18 November 1983	Kenya	0–0	Tanzania

20 November 1983	Uganda	1–1	Tanzania

=== 1984 ===
4 August 1984	Tanzania	0–1	Uganda	Dar es Salaam

18 August 1984	Uganda	1–3	Tanzania	Kampala

13 October 1984	Tanzania	1–1	Sudan	Mwanza, Tanzania
	Tino 28'		Mazda 68'	Stadium: CCM Kirumba Stadium; Referee: George Katumba (Uganda)

27 October 1984	Sudan	0–0	Tanzania	Khartoum, Sudan
				Stadium: Khartoum Stadium; Referee: Amin Salem (Egypt)

1 December 1984	Uganda	1–1	Tanzania

5 December 1984	Zambia	2–1	Tanzania

8 December 1984	Tanzania	2–2	Zimbabwe

=== 1985 ===
4 October 1985	Zimbabwe	1–0	Tanzania

8 October 1985	Kenya	3–2	Tanzania	Harare
	? ? Mahila 86'		Mogella ?

=== 1986 ===
5 October 1986	Ethiopia	4–2	Tanzania	Addis Ababa

=== 1987 ===
29 March 1987	Sudan	1–0	Tanzania	Khartoum
	Waleed Tashein

11 April 1987	Tanzania	1–1	Sudan	Dar es Salaam
	Manara 19'		Majdi Kassala 59'

13 December 1987	Ethiopia	0–0	Tanzania

16 December 1987	Kenya	3–2	Tanzania
	Motego ? ?

19 December 1987	Zanzibar	2–0	Tanzania

=== 1988 ===
1 October 1988	Tanzania	1–1	Swaziland	Dar es Salaam
	Gaga 57' (pen.)		Goal	Referee: Katongo Kabungo (Zambia)

16 October 1988	Swaziland	1–1 (3–1 p)	Tanzania	Mbabane
	Goal		Fumo 88'	Referee: John Nkathazo (Zimbabwe)

6 November 1988	Malawi	0–0	Tanzania

10 November 1988	Kenya	0–0	Tanzania

12 November 1988	Zanzibar	1–0	Tanzania

=== 1989 ===
3 December 1989	Zimbabwe	3–0	Tanzania

5 December 1989	Kenya A	2–1	Tanzania

8 December 1989	Uganda	5–1	Tanzania

== 1990s ==
=== 1990 ===
19 August 1990	Zaire	2–0	Tanzania	Stade des Martyrs, Kinshasa
	Kabongo 6', 75'			Referee: William Ochieng (Kenya)

1 September 1990	Tanzania	0–0	Gabon	Uhuru Stadium, Dar es Salaam

8 December 1990	Zanzibar	0–0	Tanzania

11 December 1990	Malawi	1–0	Tanzania
	Gondwe 20'

14 December 1990	Zimbabwe	2–0	Tanzania

17 December 1990	Uganda	1–1 (6–5 p)	Tanzania
	Mayanja 27'		Mogella 25'

19 December 1990	Zanzibar	1–2	Tanzania

=== 1991 ===
14 April 1991	Uganda	3–2	Tanzania	Nakivubo Stadium, Kampala
	Musisi 22', 26', 65'		Haule 43', 45'	Attendance: 9,000

27 April 1991	Tanzania	1–0	Zaire	Uhuru Stadium, Dar es Salaam
	Haule 63'			Attendance: 15,000; Referee: Charles Masembe (Uganda)

14 July 1991	Gabon	1–0	Tanzania	Stade Omar Bongo, Libreville
	Anotho 37'			Attendance: 30,000

29 July 1991	Tanzania	1–1	Uganda	Uhuru Stadium, Dar es Salaam
	Goal		Goal

24 November 1991	Tanzania	1–1	Sudan

30 November 1991	Uganda	5–0	Tanzania

=== 1994 ===
29 November 1994	Tanzania	4–0	Somalia

1 December 1994	Kenya A	0–1	Tanzania

3 December 1994	Tanzania	3–0	Djibouti

5 December 1994	Tanzania	1–0	Eritrea	Nairobi

10 December 1994	Tanzania	2–2 (a.e.t.) (4–3 p)	Uganda	Nairobi

=== 1995 ===
27 November 1995	Tanzania	2–2	Ethiopia

1 December 1995	Tanzania	7–0	Somalia

3 December 1995	Uganda B	2–1	Tanzania

=== 1996 ===
8 June 1996	Tanzania	0–0	Ghana	National Stadium, Dar es Salaam
16:00		Report		Attendance: 15,000; Referee: Charles Baku Ndukize (Burundi)

17 June 1996	Ghana	2–1	Tanzania	Kumasi Sports Stadium, Kumasi
15:00	Johnson 70'; Augustine 81'	Report	Daima 71'	Attendance: 45,000; Referee: Lucien Bouchardeau (Niger)

5 October 1996	Togo	2–1	Tanzania	Stade Municipal (Lomé), Lomé
	T. Salou 17'; Abalo 57'		Samieh 72'	Attendance: 20,000

22 November 1996	Uganda	1–0	Tanzania

24 November 1996	Sudan	3–2	Tanzania
	Anas; Akef; Kome

=== 1997 ===
26 January 1997	Tanzania	1–2	Zaire	National Stadium, Dar es Salaam
	Kizito 79'		Mbayo 52'; Kayu 85'	Attendance: 12,000

23 February 1997	Tanzania	1–1	Liberia	National Stadium, Dar es Salaam
	Saidi 75'		Sogbie 27'	Attendance: 10,000

22 June 1997	Tanzania	1–0	Togo	Sheikh Amri Abeid Memorial Stadium, Arusha
	Amlima 31'			Attendance: 10,000

13 July 1997	DR Congo	1–1	Tanzania	Stade Kamanyola, Kinshasa
				Attendance: 25,000

27 July 1997	Liberia	1–0	Tanzania	Samuel Kanyon Doe Stadium, Monrovia
	Zizi Roberts 54'			Attendance: 20,000

=== 1999 ===
26 July 1999	Tanzania	2–1	Djibouti

28 July 1999	Rwanda A	0–0	Tanzania

31 July 1999	Burundi	1–0	Tanzania

== 2000s ==
=== 2000 ===
8 April 2000	Tanzania	0–1	Ghana	Sheikh Amri Abeid Memorial Stadium, Arusha
16:00 (UTC+3)		Report	Kuffour 21'	Attendance: 13,000; Referee: Eusebio Alfredo (Mozambique)

23 April 2000	Ghana	3–2	Tanzania	Ohene Djan Stadium, Accra
16:00 (UTC+0)	Kuffour 19'; Ahinful 28'; Addo 64'	Report	Lungu 44'; Abubakari 54'	Attendance: 15,000; Referee: Abdou Diouf (Senegal)

=== 2001 ===
9 December 2001	Tanzania	2–1	Burundi
	Macho 24'; Tondolawere 30'		Kubi 56'

11 December 2001	Tanzania	1–0	Uganda
	Maulidi 56'

13 December 2001	Djibouti	1–4	Tanzania
	Ismael 75'		Kasonso 7'; Gabriel 49'; Nyagawa 52'; Mwansasu 67'

17 December 2001	Tanzania	1–2	Rwanda B
	Macho 5'		Witakenge 1'; Kombi 56'

=== 2002 ===
30 November 2002	Tanzania	1–0	Kenya	CCM Kirumba Stadium, Mwanza
	Ngoye 9'

2 December 2002	Tanzania	1–1	Sudan	CCM Kirumba Stadium, Mwanza
	Edward 80'		Kabair 82'

5 December 2002	Burundi	0–2	Tanzania	CCM Kirumba Stadium, Mwanza
			Machupa 4', 36'

8 December 2002	Eritrea	1–1	Tanzania	CCM Kirumba Stadium, Mwanza
	Fesehaye 45'		Mwakingwe 24'

11 December 2002	Tanzania	3–0	Rwanda	CCM Kirumba Stadium, Mwanza
	Mtiro 44'; Edward 69'; Machupa 83'

14 December 2002	Tanzania	2–3	Kenya	CCM Kirumba Stadium, Mwanza
	Gabriel 28'; Mexime 59' (pen.)		Oyuga 30'; Baraza 70'; Oliech 72'

=== 2004 ===
13 December 2004	Zanzibar	4–2	Tanzania
	Abdalla 6' (pen.); Juma 28', 73'; Mohamed 85'		Mexime 23'; Machupa 32'

15 December 2004	Tanzania	0–2	Burundi
			Kubis 46', 90'

17 December 2004	Ethiopia	2–0	Tanzania
	Alamirew 55'; Tafese 90'

19 December 2004	Tanzania	1–5	Rwanda
	?		Lomami (?); Karekezi (?); Zibomana (?)

=== 2005 ===
28 November 2005	Burundi	1–2	Tanzania

2 December 2005	Tanzania	1–1	Zanzibar

4 December 2005	Eritrea	0–1	Tanzania
			Bakari 38'

6 December 2005	Rwanda	3–1	Tanzania
	Lomani; Gatete		Kesshy

=== 2006 ===
25 November 2006	Ethiopia	1–2	Tanzania	Addis Ababa Stadium
	Assefa 24'	Report	Maftah 40'; Admin 60'

28 November 2006	Tanzania	2–1	Malawi	Addis Ababa Stadium
	Mrwanda 5'; Admin 90+'	Report	Wadabwa 15'

1 December 2006	Tanzania	3–0	Djibouti	Addis Ababa Stadium
	Ngassa 8'; Sued 45+'; Tegete 58'

5 December 2006	Tanzania	1–2	Rwanda	Addis Ababa Stadium
	Uzamukunda 26'	Report	Ujenza 41'; Witkenge 55' (pen.)

=== 2007 ===
8 December 2007	Tanzania	2–1	Kenya	National Stadium, Dar es Salaam
	Khalfan 16' (pen.); Mrwanda 89'	Report	Wanga 45'

12 December 2007	Tanzania	1–0	Somalia	National Stadium, Dar es Salaam
	Chuma 65'	Report

15 December 2007	Tanzania	0–0	Burundi	National Stadium, Dar es Salaam
		Report

17 December 2007	Sudan	2–1	Tanzania	National Stadium, Dar es Salaam
	Amarri 10', 35'	Report	Mrwanda 25'

=== 2008 ===
31 May 2008	Tanzania	1–1	Mauritius	Benjamin Mkapa National Stadium, Dar es Salaam
16:00 UTC+3	Mrwanda 70'	Report	Marquette 39'	Attendance: 35,000; Referee: Kenias Marange (Zimbabwe)

7 June 2008	Cape Verde	1–0	Tanzania	Estádio da Várzea, Praia
16:00 UTC−1	Babanco 73'	Report		Attendance: 6,000; Referee: Abdellah El Achiri (Morocco)

14 June 2008	Tanzania	0–0	Cameroon	Benjamin Mkapa National Stadium, Dar es Salaam
16:00 UTC+3		Report		Attendance: 55,000; Referee: Coffi Codjia (Benin)

21 June 2008	Cameroon	2–1	Tanzania	Stade Omnisports Ahmadou Ahidjo, Yaoundé
15:30 UTC+1	Eto'o 67', 89'	Report	Mrwanda 78'	Attendance: 25,000; Referee: John Mendy (Gambia)

6 September 2008	Mauritius	1–4	Tanzania	Stade George V, Curepipe
15:00 UTC+4	Marquette 13'	Report	Nsajigwa 12'; Khalfan 19'; Tegete 30', 34'	Attendance: 103; Referee: Alfred Ndinya (Kenya)

11 October 2008	Tanzania	3–1	Cape Verde	Benjamin Mkapa National Stadium, Dar es Salaam
16:00 UTC+3	Iddy 5'; Tegete 26'; Ngassa 74'	Report	Semedo 34'	Attendance: 10,000; Referee: Jerome Damon (South Africa)

== 2010s ==
=== 2010 ===
3 September 2010	Algeria	1–1	Tanzania	Mustapha Tchaker Stadium, Blida
22:00 UTC+1	Guedioura 45'	Report	Tegete 33'	Attendance: 30,000; Referee: Kokou Djaoupe (Togo)

9 October 2010	Tanzania	0–1	Morocco	Benjamin Mkapa National Stadium, Dar es Salaam
16:00 UTC+3		Report	El Hamdaoui 43'	Referee: Seechurn Rajindraparsad (Mauritius)

=== 2011 ===
9 February 2011 Friendly	Tanzania	1–0	Palestine	Dar es Salaam, Tanzania
--:-- UTC+3	Ngassa 61'			Stadium: National Stadium; Referee: Odan Mbaga (Tanzania)

26 March 2011	Tanzania	2–1	Central African Republic	Benjamin Mkapa National Stadium, Dar es Salaam
16:00 UTC+3	Nditi 70'; Samatta 90'	Report	Mabidé 2'

5 June 2011	Central African Republic	2–1	Tanzania	Barthélemy Boganda Stadium, Bangui
15:00 UTC+1	Momi 38'; Dopékoulouyen 88'	Report	Nditi 76'	Referee: Joseph Lamptey (Ghana)

3 September 2011	Tanzania	1–1	Algeria	Benjamin Mkapa National Stadium, Dar es Salaam
16:00 UTC+3	Samatta 22'	Report	Bouazza 52'	Referee: Ali Lenghaifry (Mauritania)

9 October 2011	Morocco	3–1	Tanzania	Marrakesh Stadium, Marrakesh
19:30 UTC±00:00	Chamakh 20'; Taarabt 69'; Boussoufa 90'	Report	Kassim 40'

11 November 2011	Chad	1–2	Tanzania	Stade Omnisports Idriss Mahamat Ouya, N'Djamena
16:00 UTC+1	Labbo 16'	Report	Ngassa 11'; Bakari 80'	Attendance: 10,000; Referee: Bunmi Ogunkolade (Nigeria)

15 November 2011	Tanzania	0–1	Chad	Benjamin Mkapa National Stadium, Dar es Salaam
16:00 UTC+3		Report	Labbo 47'	Attendance: 42,700; Referee: Hamada Nampiandraza (Madagascar)

=== 2012 ===
2 June 2012	Ivory Coast	2–0	Tanzania	Stade Félix Houphouët-Boigny, Abidjan
17:00 UTC±0	Kalou 10'; Drogba 71'	Report		Attendance: 15,000; Referee: Slim Jedidi (Tunisia)

10 June 2012	Tanzania	2–1	Gambia	Benjamin Mkapa National Stadium, Dar es Salaam
16:00 UTC+3	Kapombe 61'; Nyoni 85' (pen.)	Report	M. Ceesay 8'	Attendance: 20,000; Referee: Ruzive Ruzive (Zimbabwe)

=== 2013 ===
24 March 2013	Tanzania	3–1	Morocco	Benjamin Mkapa National Stadium, Dar es Salaam
15:00 UTC+3	Ulimwengu 46'; Samata 67', 79'	Report	El-Arabi 90+3'	Attendance: 40,000; Referee: Hélder Martins de Carvalho (Angola)

8 June 2013	Morocco	2–1	Tanzania	Marrakesh Stadium, Marrakesh
21:00 UTC+1	Hamdallah 39' (pen.); El-Arabi 51'	Report	Kiemba 26'	Attendance: 15,000; Referee: Daniel Bennett (South Africa)

16 June 2013	Tanzania	2–4	Ivory Coast	Benjamin Mkapa National Stadium, Dar es Salaam
15:00 UTC+3	Kiemba 2'; Ulimwengu 34'	Report	Traoré 13'; Touré 23', 43' (pen.); Bony 90+3'	Attendance: 60,000; Referee: Mehdi Abid Charef (Algeria)

7 September 2013	Gambia	2–0	Tanzania	Independence Stadium, Bakau
16:30 UTC±0	Jarju 44', 51'	Report		Attendance: 10,000; Referee: Hudu Munyemana (Rwanda)

=== 2015 ===
14 June 2015	Egypt	3–0	Tanzania	Borg El Arab Stadium, Alexandria
19:00 UTC+2	Rabia 60'; Morsy 64'; Salah 69'	Report		Referee: Bamlak Tessema Weyesa (Ethiopia)

5 September 2015	Tanzania	0–0	Nigeria	National Stadium, Dar es Salaam
16:30 UTC+3		Report		Referee: Louis Hakizimana (Rwanda)

7 October 2015	Tanzania	2–0	Malawi	Benjamin Mkapa National Stadium, Dar es Salaam
16:00 UTC+3	Samatta 19'; Ulimwengu 23'	Report (FIFA); Report (CAF)		Attendance: 11,474; Referee: Hagi Wiish (Somalia)

11 October 2015	Malawi	1–0	Tanzania	Kamuzu Stadium, Blantyre
14:00 UTC+2	Banda 42'	Report (FIFA); Report (CAF)		Attendance: 7,656; Referee: Hélder Martins de Carvalho (Angola)

14 November 2015	Tanzania	2–2	Algeria	Benjamin Mkapa National Stadium, Dar es Salaam
16:30 UTC+3	Maguri 43'; Samatta 55'	Report (FIFA); Report (CAF)	Slimani 72', 75'	Attendance: 37,913; Referee: Mahamadou Keita (Mali)

17 November 2015	Algeria	7–0	Tanzania	Stade Mustapha Tchaker, Blida
19:15 UTC+1	Brahimi 1'; Ghoulam 23', 59' (pen.); Mahrez 43'; Slimani 49' (pen.), 75'; Medjani 72'	Report (FIFA); Report (CAF)		Attendance: 35,000; Referee: Sidi Alioum (Cameroon)

=== 2016 ===
23 March 2016	Chad	Annulled (originally 0–1)	Tanzania	Stade Omnisports Idriss Mahamat Ouya, N'Djamena
15:30 UTC+1		Report	Samatta 32'	Referee: Jean-Jacques Ndala Ngambo (Congo DR)

28 March 2016	Tanzania	Cancelled	Chad	National Stadium, Dar es Salaam
16:00 UTC+3		Report		Referee: Djamal Aden (Djibouti)

4 June 2016	Tanzania	0–2	Egypt	National Stadium, Dar es Salaam
16:00 UTC+3		Report	Salah 44', 58'	Referee: Eric Otogo-Castane (Gabon)

3 September 2016	Nigeria	1–0	Tanzania	Akwa Ibom Stadium, Uyo
17:00 UTC+1	Iheanacho 78'	Report		Referee: Mehdi Abid Charef (Algeria)

=== 2017 ===
10 June 2017	Tanzania	1–1	Lesotho	National Stadium, Dar es Salaam
20:00 UTC+3	Samatta 28'	Report	Tale 35'	Referee: Djamal Aden (Djibouti)

=== 2018 ===
8 September 2018	Uganda	0–0	Tanzania	Mandela National Stadium, Kira
16:00 UTC+3		Report		Referee: Eric Otogo-Castane (Gabon)

12 October 2018	Cape Verde	3–0	Tanzania	Estádio Nacional de Cabo Verde, Praia
16:00 UTC−1	Gomes 16', 23'; Stopira 84'	Report		Referee: Boubou Traoré (Mali)

16 October 2018	Tanzania	2–0	Cape Verde	National Stadium, Dar es Salaam
17:00 UTC+3	Msuva 29'; Samatta 57'	Report		Referee: Souleiman Ahmed Djama (Djibouti)

18 November 2018	Lesotho	1–0	Tanzania	Setsoto Stadium, Maseru
16:00 UTC+2	Lerotholi 76'	Report		Referee: Thierry Nkurunziza (Burundi)

24 March 2019	Tanzania	3–0	Uganda	National Stadium, Dar es Salaam
18:00 UTC+3	Msuva 21'; Nyoni 51' (pen.); Morris 57'	Report		Referee: Eric Otogo-Castane (Gabon)

=== 2019 ===
23 June 2019	Senegal	2–0	Tanzania	30 June Stadium, Cairo
19:00	Keita 28'; Diatta 64'	Report		Attendance: 7,249; Referee: Sadok Selmi (Tunisia)

27 June 2019	Kenya	3–2	Tanzania	30 June Stadium, Cairo
22:00	Olunga 39', 80'; Omolo 62'	Report	Msuva 6'; Samatta 40'	Attendance: 7,233; Referee: Ahmad Heeralall (Mauritius)

1 July 2019	Tanzania	0–3	Algeria	Al Salam Stadium, Cairo
21:00		Report	Slimani 35'; Ounas 39', 45+1'	Attendance: 8,921; Referee: Andofetra Rakotojaona (Madagascar)

4 September 2019	Burundi	1–1	Tanzania	Prince Louis Rwagasore Stadium, Bujumbura
15:00 UTC+2	C. Amissi 81'	Report	Msuva 85'	Attendance: 22,000; Referee: Kokou Ntalé (Togo)

8 September 2019	Tanzania	1–1 (a.e.t.) (3–0 p)	Burundi	National Stadium, Dar es Salaam
16:00 UTC+3	Samatta 29'	Report	Abdul Razak 45+2'	Attendance: 55,000; Referee: Norman Matemera (Zimbabwe)
	Penalties
	Nyoni (penalty scored); Mao (penalty scored); Kamagi (penalty scored)		(penalty missed) Ngandu; (penalty missed) Berahino; (penalty missed) Bigirimana

15 November 2019	Tanzania	2–1	Equatorial Guinea	National Stadium, Dar es Salaam
19:00 UTC+3	Msuva 69'; Abubakar 90+2'	Report	Obiang 15'	Referee: Imtehaz Heeralall (Mauritius)

19 November 2019	Libya	2–1	Tanzania	Stade Mustapha Ben Jannet, Monastir (Tunisia) (Note: Libya will play their home matches outside Libya due to security concerns from the ongoing civil war.)
20:00 UTC+1	Al Warfali 68' (pen.); Saltou 81'	Report	Samatta 18' (pen.)	Referee: Ishmael Chizinga (Malawi)

== 2020s ==
=== 2020 ===
13 November 2020	Tunisia	1–0	Tanzania	Stade Hammadi Agrebi, Tunis
20:00 UTC+1	Msakni 18' (pen.)	Report		Referee: Helder Martins de Carvalho (Angola)

17 November 2020	Tanzania	1–1	Tunisia	National Stadium, Dar es Salaam
22:00 UTC+3	Salum 48'	Report	Khaoui 11'	Referee: Celso Alvação (Mozambique)

=== 2021 ===
25 March 2021	Equatorial Guinea	1–0	Tanzania	Estadio de Malabo, Malabo
20:00 UTC+1	Nsue 90'	Report		Referee: Bernard Camille (Seychelles)

28 March 2021	Tanzania	1–0	Libya	National Stadium, Dar es Salaam
16:00 UTC+3	Msuva 45+2'	Report		Referee: Hassan Mohamed Hagi (Somalia)

2 September 2021	DR Congo	1–1	Tanzania	Stade TP Mazembe, Lubumbashi
15:00 UTC+2	Mbokani 23'	Report	Msuva 36'	Attendance: 0 Referee: Kalilou Ibrahim Traore (Ivory Coast)

7 September 2021	Tanzania	3–2	Madagascar	National Stadium, Dar es Salaam
21:00 UTC+3	Nyoni 2' (pen.); Dismas 26'; Salum 53'	Report	Rakotoharimalala 36'; Fontaine 45+2'	Attendance: 0 Referee: Mashood Ssali (Uganda)

7 October 2021	Tanzania	0–1	Benin	National Stadium, Dar es Salaam
16:00 UTC+3		Report	Mounié 72'	Attendance: 500; Referee: Celso Alvação (Mozambique)

10 October 2021	Benin	0–1	Tanzania	Stade de l'Amitié, Cotonou
14:00 UTC+1		Report	Msuva 6'	Attendance: 15,000; Referee: Omar Abdulkadir Artan (Somalia)

11 November 2021	Tanzania	0–3	DR Congo	National Stadium, Dar es Salaam
16:00 UTC+3		Report	Kakuta 6'; Fasika 66'; Malango 85'	Attendance: 10,000; Referee: Bernard Camille (Seychelles)

14 November 2021	Madagascar	1–1	Tanzania	Mahamasina Municipal Stadium, Antananarivo
16:00 UTC+3	Abdallah 74'	Report	Msuva 25'	Attendance: 30,000; Referee: Messie Nkounkou (Republic of Congo)

9 December Friendly	Tanzania	0–2	Uganda
		Report	Asaba 71'; Vuni 90+1'

=== 2022 ===
23 March Friendly	Tanzania	3–1	Central African Republic
	Dismas 10'; Samatta 63'; Mpole 90+2'	Report	Yawanendji 66'

29 March Friendly	Tanzania	1–1	Sudan	Dar es Salaam, Tanzania
	Msuva 67'		Kuwa 2'	Stadium: National Stadium (Tanzania)

4 June 2023 AFCON qualification	Niger	1–1	Tanzania	Cotonou, Benin
17:00	Sosah 26'	Report	Mpole 1'	Stadium: Stade de l'Amitié; Referee: Komlanvi Aklassou (Togo)

8 June 2023 AFCON qualification	Tanzania	0–2	Algeria	Dar es Salaam, Tanzania
19:00 UTC+3		Report	Bensebaini 45+2'; Amoura 89'	Stadium: National Stadium (Tanzania); Referee: Mahmood Ismail (Sudan)

24 September Friendly	Tanzania	1–0	Uganda	Benghazi, Libya
19:00 UTC+2	Msuva 29'			Stadium: Martyrs of February Stadium

27 September Friendly	Libya	2–1	Tanzania	Benghazi, Libya
				Stadium: Martyrs of February Stadium

=== 2023 ===
24 March 2023 AFCON qualification	Uganda	0–1	Tanzania	Ismailia, Egypt
16:00 UTC+2		Report	Msuva 68'	Stadium: Suez Canal Stadium; Referee: Ahmad Imtehaz Heeralall (Mauritius)

28 March 2023 AFCON qualification	Tanzania	0–1	Uganda	Dar es Salaam, Tanzania
20:00 UTC+3		Report	Mato 90+1'	Stadium: National Stadium; Referee: Ibrahim Kalilou Traore (Ivory Coast)

18 June 2023 AFCON qualification	Tanzania	1–0	Niger	Dar es Salaam, Tanzania
16:00 UTC+3	Msuva 69'	Report		Stadium: National Stadium (Tanzania); Referee: Mohamed Al Sayd (Egypt)

7 September 2023 AFCON qualification	Algeria	0–0	Tanzania	Annaba, Algeria
20:00 UTC+1		Report		Stadium: 19 May 1956 Stadium; Referee: Djindo Louis Houngnandande (Benin)

15 October Friendly	Sudan	1–1	Tanzania	Taif, Saudi Arabia
19:00 UTC+3	Musab	Report	Bajana	Stadium: King Fahd Sports City

18 November 2026 FIFA World Cup qualification	Niger	0–1	Tanzania	Marrakesh, Morocco
17:00 UTC+1		Report	M'Mombwa 56'	Stadium: Marrakesh Stadium; Attendance: 178; Referee: Lotfi Bekouassa (Algeria)

21 November 2026 FIFA World Cup qualification	Tanzania	0–2	Morocco	Dar es Salaam, Tanzania
19:00 UTC+3		Report	Ziyech 28'; Mwamnyeto 54' (o.g.)	Stadium: Benjamin Mkapa (National Stadium); Attendance: 60,000; Referee: Abongile Tom (South Africa)

27 December Friendly	Zanzibar	0–0	Tanzania

=== 2024 ===
7 January Friendly	Egypt	2–0	Tanzania	Cairo, Egypt
18:00 UTC+2	Trézéguet 32'; Manula 73' (o.g.)	Report		Stadium: Cairo International Stadium; Referee: Hashem Al-Ibrahim (Kuwait)

17 January 2023 AFCON GS	Morocco	3–0	Tanzania	San Pédro, Ivory Coast
				Stadium: Laurent Pokou Stadium

21 January 2023 AFCON GS	Zambia	1–1	Tanzania	San Pédro, Ivory Coast
				Stadium: Laurent Pokou Stadium

24 January 2023 AFCON GS	Tanzania	0–0	DR Congo	Korhogo, Ivory Coast
				Stadium: Amadou Gon Coulibaly Stadium

22 March 2024 FIFA World Series	Tanzania	0–1	Bulgaria	Baku, Azerbaijan
15:00 UTC+4		Report	Despodov 52'	Stadium: Dalga Arena; Attendance: 154; Referee: Aliyar Aghayev (Azerbaijan)

25 March 2024 FIFA World Series	Tanzania	3–0	Mongolia	Baku, Azerbaijan
17:00 UTC+4	John 49'; Sopu 62'; Miroshi 76'	Report		Stadium: Dalga Arena; Attendance: 146; Referee: Elçin Məsiyev (Azerbaijan)

15 May Friendly	Sudan	2–1	Tanzania	Al Hawiyah, Saudi Arabia
16:00 UTC+3	Abdelrazeg 11'; Vitalis 27'	Report; Report (SFA)	Ahmada 80'	Stadium: King Fahd Sports City (Taif)

19 May Friendly	Sudan	0–1	Tanzania	Al Hawiyah, Saudi Arabia
17:00 UTC+3		Report	Adam 80'	Stadium: King Fahd Sports City (Taif)

2 June Friendly	Indonesia	0–0	Tanzania	Jakarta, Indonesia
16:00 UTC+7				Stadium: Madya Stadium

11 June 2026 FIFA World Cup qualification	Zambia	0–1	Tanzania	Ndola, Zambia
15:00 UTC+2		Report	Waziri 5'	Stadium: Levy Mwanawasa Stadium; Referee: Abdel Aziz Bouh (Mauritania)

4 September 2025 AFCON qualification	Tanzania	0–0	Ethiopia	Dar es Salaam, Tanzania
19:00 UTC+3		Report		Stadium: Benjamin Mkapa Stadium; Referee: Issa Sy (Senegal)

10 September 2025 AFCON qualification	Guinea	1–2	Tanzania	Yamoussoukro, Ivory Coast
16:00 UTC+0	Bayo 57'	Report	Salum 61'; Yahya 88'	Stadium: Charles Konan Banny Stadium; Referee: Jean Ouattara (Burkina Faso)

10 October 2025 AFCON qualification	DR Congo	1–0	Tanzania	Kinshasa, DR Congo
--:--	Mzize 53' (o.g.)	Report		Stadium: Stade des Martyrs; Referee: Hillary Hambaba (Zambia)

15 October 2025 AFCON qualification	Tanzania	0–2	DR Congo	Dar es Salaam, Tanzania
16:00 UTC+3		Report	Elia 87', 90+3'	Stadium: Benjamin Mkapa Stadium; Referee: Celso Alvação (Mozambique)

16 November 2025 Africa Cup of Nations qualification	Ethiopia	0–2	Tanzania	Kinshasa, DR Congo
16:00 UTC+1			Msuva 15'; Salum 31'	Stadium: Stade des Martyrs

19 November 2025 Africa Cup of Nations qualification	Tanzania	1–0	Guinea	Dar es Salaam, Tanzania
16:00 UTC+3	Msuva 61'			Stadium: Benjamin Mkapa Stadium

=== 2025 ===
25 March 2026 World Cup qualification	Morocco	2–0	Tanzania	Oujda, Morocco
21:30 UTC+0	Aguerd 51'; Díaz 58' (pen.)	Report		Stadium: Honor Stadium; Referee: Alhadi Allaou Mahamat (Chad)

5 September 2026 World Cup qualification	Congo	1–1	Tanzania	Brazzaville, Congo
17:00 UTC+1	Moussavou 68'	Report	Mwalimu 84'	Stadium: Stade Alphonse Massemba-Débat; Referee: Thabang Ketshabile (Botswana)

9 September 2026 World Cup qualification	Tanzania	0–1	Niger	Zanzibar City, Tanzania
16:00 UTC+3		Report	Sosah 58'	Stadium: Amaan Stadium; Referee: Mustapha Ghorbal (Algeria)

8 October 2026 World Cup qualification	Tanzania	0–1	Zambia	Zanzibar City, Tanzania
22:00 UTC+3		Report	F. Sakala 75'	Stadium: Amaan Stadium; Referee: Ibrahim Kalilou Traore (Ivory Coast)

14 October Friendly	Iran	2–0	Tanzania	Dubai, United Arab Emirates
20:00 UTC+4	Hosseinzadeh 17' (pen.); Mohebi 26'	Report		Stadium: Rashid Stadium; Referee: Adel Al Naqbi (United Arab Emirates)

15 November Friendly	Kuwait	4–3	Tanzania	Cairo, Egypt
18:00 UTC+2		Report		Stadium: Al Salam Stadium

23 December 2025 AFCON GS	Nigeria	2–1	Tanzania	Fez, Morocco
18:30 UTC+1	Ajayi 36'; Lookman 52'	Report	M'Mombwa 50'	Stadium: Fez Stadium; Attendance: 11,444; Referee: Dahane Beida (Mauritania)

27 December 2025 AFCON GS	Uganda	1–1	Tanzania	Rabat, Morocco
18:30 UTC+1	Ikpeazu 80'	Report	Msuva 59' (pen.)	Stadium: Al Medina Stadium; Attendance: 10,540; Referee: Jalal Jayed (Morocco)

30 December 2025 AFCON GS	Tanzania	1–1	Tunisia	Rabat, Morocco
17:00 UTC+1	Salum 48'	Report	Gharbi 43' (pen.)	Stadium: Rabat Olympic Stadium; Attendance: 15,205; Referee: Jean-Jacques Ndala (DR Congo)

=== 2026 ===
4 January 2025 AFCON R16	Morocco	1–0	Tanzania	Rabat, Morocco
17:00 UTC+1	Díaz 64'	Report		Stadium: Prince Moulay Abdellah Stadium; Attendance: 63,894; Referee: Boubou Traore (Mali)

26 March 2026 FIFA Series	Tanzania	0–1	Liechtenstein	Kigali, Rwanda
16:30 UTC+2		Report	Sağlam 55'	Stadium: Kigali Pelé Stadium; Referee: Mohamed Diraneh (Djibouti)

29 March 2026 FIFA Series	Macau	0–6	Tanzania	Kigali, Rwanda
15:00 UTC+2		Report	Amâncio 16' (o.g.); Mwamnyeto 26'; Yahya 45'; Peter 56'; Miroshi 74'; Allarakhia 87'	Stadium: Kigali Pelé Stadium; Attendance: 12,900; Referee: Lucky Kasalirwe (Uganda)

4 June Friendly	Tanzania	Cancelled	Uganda	Marrakesh, Morocco
21:00 UTC+1				Stadium: Marrakesh Stadium

8 June Friendly	Tanzania	Cancelled	Rwanda	Marrakesh, Morocco
21:00 UTC+1				Stadium: Marrakesh Stadium
