= 2007 CECAFA Cup =

Tournament details
- Host country: Tanzania
- Dates: 8–22 December
- Teams: 11 (from CECAFA confederations)
- Venues: 2 (in 2 host cities)

Final positions
- Champions: Sudan (3rd title)
- Runners-up: Rwanda
- Third place: Uganda

Tournament statistics
- Matches played: 23
- Goals scored: 62 (2.7 per match)
- Top scorer: (Sudan) Abdelhameed Amarri (6 goals)

The 2007 CECAFA Cup is the 31st edition of the football tournament that involves teams from East and Central Africa.

All matches are to be played from 8 to 22 December 2007 at the National Stadium, Dar es Salaam, Tanzania and Sheikh Amri Abeid Stadium, Arusha, Tanzania.

== Information ==
- The Cecafa Senior Challenge Cup received a major boost on Tuesday after clinching a US$4m four-year sponsorship deal with Gateway TV (GTV).
- The winner of this year's competition will receive $30,000, the second-placed team will be given $20,000, with $10,000 going to the side that comes third.
- Sudan fielded mostly their youth players ('B' team), with some senior players.

== Group A ==
Team	Pld	W	D	L	GF	GA	GD	Pts
Burundi	3	2	1	0	4	0	+4	7
Tanzania	3	2	1	0	3	1	+2	7
Kenya	3	1	0	2	3	3	0	3
Somalia	3	0	0	3	0	6	−6	0

8 December 2007

Tanzania	2–1	Kenya
Khalfan 16' (pen.); Mrwanda 89'	Report	Wanga 45'

National Stadium, Dar es Salaam

10 December 2007

Somalia	0–3	Burundi
	Report	Nzohabonayo 19'; Ndikumana 77', 82'

National Stadium, Dar es Salaam

12 December 2007

Kenya	0–1	Burundi
	Report	Mbazumutima 33'

National Stadium, Dar es Salaam

12 December 2007

Tanzania	1–0	Somalia
Chuma 65'	Report

National Stadium, Dar es Salaam

14 December 2007

Kenya	2–0	Somalia
Mwangi 45'; Wanga 55'	Report

National Stadium, Dar es Salaam

15 December 2007

Tanzania	0–0	Burundi
	Report

National Stadium, Dar es Salaam

== Group B ==
Team	Pld	W	D	L	GF	GA	GD	Pts
Uganda	3	2	0	1	11	3	+8	6
Rwanda	3	2	0	1	11	3	+8	6
Eritrea	3	2	0	1	7	6	+1	6
Djibouti	3	0	0	3	2	19	−17	0

- Uganda won group on better head-to-head record against Rwanda.

9 December 2007

Uganda	7–0	Djibouti
Kitagenda 18', 20', 37'; Wagaluka 40'; Maganga 45'; Odur 60'; Kayizzi 80'	Report

National Stadium, Dar es Salaam

9 December 2007

Rwanda	2–1	Eritrea
Niyonzima 6'; Bokota 41'	Report	Aregaye 38'

National Stadium, Dar es Salaam

11 December 2007

Djibouti	2–3	Eritrea
Daher 71'; Kader 86'		Aregaye 6'; Shimangus 46'; Fesehaye 69'

National Stadium, Dar es Salaam

11 December 2007

Rwanda	0–2	Uganda
		Masaba 69'; Bajope 86'

National Stadium, Dar es Salaam

13 December 2007

Djibouti	0–9	Rwanda
	Report	Karekezi 17', 84'; Ahmed 25' (o.g.); Bokota 38', 42', 77'; Tuyisenge 47'; Uzamukunda 54'; Ngoma 61'

National Stadium, Dar es Salaam

14 December 2007

Eritrea	3–2	Uganda
Temekribon 53', 62'; Ghebrehine 82'	Report	Maganga 54'; Wagaluka 74'

National Stadium, Dar es Salaam

== Group C ==
Team	Pld	W	D	L	GF	GA	GD	Pts
Zanzibar	2	1	1	0	5	3	+2	4
Sudan	2	0	2	0	2	2	0	2
Ethiopia	2	0	1	1	1	3	−2	1

9 December 2007

Sudan	2–2	Zanzibar
Amari 55', 80'	Report	Mkwenche 60'; Juma 84'

Sheikh Amri Abeid Stadium, Arusha

13 December 2007

Zanzibar	3–1	Ethiopia
Masoud 18'; Kassim 64'; Ahmed Ali 75'	Report	Demeke 39'

Sheikh Amri Abeid Stadium, Arusha

15 December 2007

Ethiopia	0–0	Sudan
	Report

Sheikh Amri Abeid Stadium, Arusha

== Knock-out stage ==
Quarter-finals
December 17 – Dar es Salaam
Sudan	2
Tanzania	1
December 17 – Dar es Salaam
Burundi	2
Eritrea	1
December 18 – Dar es Salaam
Uganda (pen.)	1 (4)
Kenya	1 (2)
December 18 – Dar es Salaam
Zanzibar	0 (4)
Rwanda (pen.)	0 (5)

Semi-finals
December 19 – Dar es Salaam
Sudan	2
Burundi	1
December 20 – Dar es Salaam
Uganda	0
Rwanda (a.e.t.)	1

Final
December 22 – Dar es Salaam
Sudan (pen.)	2 (4)
Rwanda	2 (2)
Third place
December 22 – Dar es Salaam
Burundi	0
Uganda	2

=== Quarter-finals ===
17 December 2007

Sudan	2–1	Tanzania
Amarri 10', 35'	Report	Mrwanda 25'

National Stadium, Dar es Salaam

17 December 2007

Burundi	2–1	Eritrea
Nahimana 69'; Ndizeye 80'	Report	Aregaye 4'

National Stadium, Dar es Salaam

18 December 2007

Uganda	1–1	Kenya
Okhuti 23'	Report	Wanga 75'
Penalties
	4–2

National Stadium, Dar es Salaam

18 December 2007

Zanzibar	0–0	Rwanda
	Report
Penalties
	5–4

National Stadium, Dar es Salaam

=== Semifinals ===
19 December 2007

Sudan	2–1	Burundi
Farah 2'; Amarri 45'	Report	Nahimana 12'

National Stadium, Dar es Salaam

20 December 2007

Uganda	0–1	Rwanda
	Report	Mwesigwa 118' (o.g.)

National Stadium, Dar es Salaam

=== Third place play-off ===
22 December 2007

Burundi	0–2	Uganda
	Report	Kitagenda

National Stadium, Dar es Salaam

=== Final ===
22 December 2007

Sudan	2–2 (a.e.t.)	Rwanda
Amarri; Karika 46'	Report	Niyonzima 48'; Mulenda 59'
Penalties
	4–2

National Stadium, Dar es Salaam

CECAFA Cup 2007 winners

Sudan
Third title

== Top goalscorers ==
Nation	Player name	Goals Scored
Sudan	Abdelhamid Amari	6
Rwanda	Labama Bokota	4
Uganda	Hamis Kitagenda	3
Eritrea	Berhane Aregaye	3
Kenya	Allan Wanga	3
Rwanda	Olivier Karekezi	2
Uganda	Ronald Maganga	2
Tanzania	Danny Mrwanda	2
Burundi	Claude Nahimana	2
Rwanda	Haruna Niyonzima	2
Eritrea	Elmon Temekribon	2
Uganda	Danny Wagaluka	2
