= Oscar Amoabeng =

Ghanaian footballer

Personal information
- Full name: Oscar Bonsu Amoabeng
- Date of birth: 31 December 1984 (age 41)
- Place of birth: Accra, Ghana
- Height: 1.83 m (6 ft 0 in)
- Positions: Attacking midfielder; right winger; second striker

Senior career*
Years	Team	Apps	(Gls)
1999–2001	Okwawu United		
2001–2003	King Solomon FC		
2003–2004	Cappellen	9	(1)
2004–2005	KVO Aarschot	22	(3)
2005–2006	FC Walem	18	(12)
2006–2008	K. Kontich FC	53	(15)
2008–2010	K.F.C. Schoten S.K.		
2010–2013	K. Putte S.K.		

International career
- Ghana U-20
2008–2011	Equatorial Guinea	3	(0)
- * Club domestic league appearances and goals

Oscar Bonsu Amoabeng (born 31 December 1984) is a retired footballer who played as a midfielder.

Born in Ghana, he was naturalized by Equatorial Guinea to play for its national team. He spent most of his club career in Belgium.

== International career ==
Amoabeng made his Equatorial Guinea national team debut on 6 September 2008 in a World Cup 2010 Qualifying match against Sierra Leone in Freetown. That day the Nzalang Nacional (the nickname of Equatorial Guinea national football team) lost by 2–0. Later, he played other World Cup 2010 Qualifying match (against South Africa on 11 October 2008, in Malabo).
