= Moussa Hirir =

Djiboutian footballer (born 1984)

Personal information
- Date of birth: 1 March 1984
- Position: Midfielder

Senior career*
Years	Team	Apps	(Gls)
2008–2009	Société Immobilière Djibouti		
2009–2014	Kartileh DjibSat		
2014–20xx	Guelleh Batal Djibouti		

International career
2008–2017	Djibouti	8	(1)
- * Club domestic league appearances and goals

Moussa Hirir (born 1 March 1984) is a Djiboutian professional footballer who plays as a midfielder for the Djibouti national football team.

== Career ==
He played from 2008 to 2009 at Société Immobilière of Djibouti. In 2009, he moved to Kartileh DjibSat and in 2014, he transferred to Guelleh Batal. He made his national debut on 13 June 2008 in the Djibouti vs Democratic Republic of the Congo match, where he scored his first goal with the national team a week later on June 22, 2008, in the return leg against Democratic Republic of the Congo.

== International goals ==
Scores and results list Djibouti's goal tally first.

#	Date	Venue	Opponent	Score	Result	Competition
1.	22 June 2006	Stade des Martyrs, Kinshasa, Congo DR	DR Congo	1–5	1–5	2010 FIFA World Cup qualification
