= Franchel Ibara =

Congolese footballer

Personal information
- Full name: Franchel Ibara
- Date of birth: 27 July 1989 (age 37)
- Place of birth: Brazzaville, Congo
- Height: 1.85 m (6 ft 1 in)
- Position: Striker

Senior career*
Years	Team	Apps	(Gls)
2006–2007	Étoile du Congo		
2007–2008	Sochaux B		
2008–2010	Étoile du Congo		
2010–2011	AS Vita Club		
2011–2012	AC Léopards		
2013–2015	Étoile du Congo		
2016	Diables Noirs		
2017	CARA Brazzaville		
2018	AS Otohô		

International career
2007	Congo U-20		
2007–2011	Congo	8	(1)
- * Club domestic league appearances and goals

Franchel Ibara (born 27 July 1989) is a Congolese former professional footballer who played as a striker.

== Club career ==
Ibara was born in Brazzaville, Congo. He played for Étoile du Congo before moving to FC Sochaux. After one year in France, he returned to Étoile du Congo and played there until 2010. In November 2010 he signed for DR Congo side AS Vita Club, before returning to Congo a year later. He signed for AC Léopards in November 2011.

== International career ==
Ibara received first cap for the full Congo national team in a qualifying match for the 2008 Africa Cup of Nations against Zambia. On 22 June 2008, he scored his first goal in a 2010 FIFA World Cup qualification match against Chad.

He also appeared at the 2007 FIFA U-20 World Cup in Canada, scoring a goal from a penalty in the 59th minute of a match against Austria on 2 July.

== Personal life ==
Franchel's brother Guillaume Ibara played most of his career in the Lower leagues in Belgium. Guillaume played during his time for Belgian provincial football league team Entente Blegnytoise, international games for the Congo national team in the African Nations Cup Qualifier.

== Career statistics ==
=== International ===
Appearances and goals by national team and year
National team	Year	Apps	Goals
Congo	2007	2	0
Congo	2008	2	1
Congo	2009	–	
Congo	2010	3	0
Congo	2011	1	0
Total		8	1

Scores and results list Congo's goal tally first, score column indicates score after each Ibara goal.

List of international goals scored by Franchel Ibara
No.	Date	Venue	Opponent	Score	Result	Competition
1	22 June 2008	Stade Alphonse Massemba-Débat, Brazzaville, Congo	Chad	2–0	2–0	2010 FIFA World Cup qualification
