= Bernard St. Ange =

Seychellois footballer

Bernard St. Ange (born August 6, 1981) is a Seychellois football player. He is a midfielder on the Seychelles national football team.

== Career statistics ==
=== International ===
Appearances and goals by national team and year
National team	Year	Apps	Goals
Seychelles	2006	2	0
Seychelles	2007	1	0
Seychelles	2008	3	1
Seychelles	2009	–	
Seychelles	2010	–	
Seychelles	2011	–	
Seychelles	2012	–	
Seychelles	2013	1	0
Total		7	1

Scores and results list Seychelles's goal tally first, score column indicates score after each St. Ange goal.

List of international goals scored by Bernard St. Ange
No.	Date	Venue	Opponent	Score	Result	Competition
1	21 June 2008	Stade du 4 Août, Ouagadougou, Burkina Faso	Burkina Faso	1–2	1–4	2010 FIFA World Cup qualification

== See also ==
- Football in Seychelles
- List of football clubs in Seychelles
