= Atusaye Nyondo =

Malawian footballer

Personal information
- Full name: Atusaye Nyondo
- Date of birth: 15 November 1990 (age 35)
- Place of birth: Mzuzu, Malawi
- Height: 1.80 m (5 ft 11 in)
- Position: Striker

Team information
- Current team: Pretoria Callies
- Number: 27

Youth career
- Chibavi Destroyers

Senior career*
Years	Team	Apps	(Gls)
2007–2009	Silver Strikers		
2009–2011	Carara Kicks	34	(18)
2011–2014	SuperSport United	38	(7)
2013–2014	→ Pretoria University (loan)	23	(7)
2014–2016	Pretoria University	46	(10)
2016–2018	Bloemfontein Celtic	18	(2)
2019	Tshakhuma		
2019–2020	Saint George		
2021–	Pretoria Callies	5	(0)

International career^{‡}
2008–	Malawi	31	(6)
- * Club domestic league appearances and goals as of 16:19, 13 June 2021 (UTC) ‡ National team caps and goals as of 1 June 2014

Atusaye Nyondo (born 15 November 1990) is a Malawian footballer who currently plays for Saint George in Ethiopia.

== Club career ==
Nyondo began his career with Silver Strikers and signed for South African National First Division side Carara Kicks on 6 August 2009. He spent two seasons playing for Kicks and finished the 2010–11 season as the division's top scorer with 15 goals.

Nyondo moved on loan to Pretoria University from Supersport United for the 2013-14 season, making into a permanent switch at the end of his loan spell.

Nyondo joined Tshakhuma Tsha Madzivhandila F.C. in February 2019, signing a one-and-a-half-year deal. In March 2019 it was reported, that Nyondo only had received 10,000 South African rand a month from the club, which was less than half of what he agreed to when he put pen to paper. Nyondo said, that it was only him and his fellow Malawian teammate, Joseph Kamwendo, who did not get paid and that the club had not explained properly, they just said that it was the budget, so Nyondo was forced to borrow money from his friends and family. Nyondo got his contract terminated a few weeks later.

In November 2019, Nyondo signed with Ethiopian club Saint George SC.

== International career ==
Nyondo represented the Malawi national football team at 2010 African Cup of Nations.
