= Henri Mbazumutima =

Burundian footballer

Personal information
- Date of birth: March 8, 1988 (age 38)
- Place of birth: Burundi
- Positions: Defender; midfielder

Team information
- Current team: Vital'O F.C.

Senior career*
Years	Team	Apps	(Gls)
2003–2004	Atlético Olympic		
2005–2006	Rayon Sport		
2006–	Vital'O F.C.		

International career
2003–2011	Burundi	27	(4)
Medal record
Men's football
Representing Burundi
CECAFA Cup
Runner-up	2004 Ethiopia
- * Club domestic league appearances and goals as of 9 November 2007

Henri Mbazumutima (born 8 March 1988) is a Burundian midfielder who played with Vital'O F.C. in the Burundi Premier League.

== Career statistics ==
=== International ===
Appearances and goals by national team and year
National team	Year	Apps	Goals
Burundi	2003	1	0
Burundi	2004	5	0
Burundi	2005	–	
Burundi	2006	1	1
Burundi	2007	6	1
Burundi	2008	6	2
Burundi	2009	3	0
Burundi	2010	4	0
Burundi	2011	1	0
Total		27	4

Scores and results list Burundi's goal tally first, score column indicates score after each Mbazumutima goal.

List of international goals scored by Henri Mbazumutima
No.	Date	Venue	Opponent	Score	Result	Competition
1	8 October 2006	Stade Prince Louis Rwagasore, Bujumbura, Burundi	Mauritania	3–1	3–1	2008 Africa Cup of Nations qualification
2	12 December 2007	Uhuru Stadium, Dar es Salaam, Tanzania	Kenya	1–0	1–0	2007 CECAFA Cup
3	21 June 2008	7 November Stadium, Radès, Tunisia	Tunisia	1–2	1–2	2010 FIFA World Cup qualification
4	6 September 2008	Stade Linité, Victoria, Seychelles	Seychelles	1–0	2–1	2010 FIFA World Cup qualification

== Honours ==
Burundi

- CECAFA Cup: Runner-up, 2004
