= Austin Makacha =

Kenyan footballer (born 1984)

Personal information
- Full name: Austin Makacha
- Date of birth: 29 May 1984 (age 42)
- Place of birth: Nairobi, Kenya
- Height: 1.84 m (6 ft 0 in)
- Position: Midfielder

Youth career
- 1998–2000: Mathare United

Senior career*
| Years | Team | Apps | (Gls) |
| 2000–2002 | AFC Leopards | 40 | (3) |
| 2002–2003 | Club Sport Herediano | 12 | (7) |
| 2003–2005 | Kangemi United | 64 | (9) |
| 2005–2009 | Mathare United | 89 | (40) |
| 2009 | IK Sirius | 12 | (0) |
| 2010– | Mathare United | | |

International career
| 2007– | Kenya | 26 | (11) |
- * Club domestic league appearances and goals

Austin Makacha (born 1 January 1984 in Nairobi) is a Kenyan football midfielder who is playing for Mathare United.

== Career ==
Makacha began his career with Mathare United of the Mathare Youth Sports Association (MYSA) and was than scouted in 2000 from AFC Leopards. In 2002 left Kenyan club AFC Leopards to join Primera División de Costa Rica club CS Herediano. He played one year in the Primera División de Costa Rica for Heredia and joined than in July 2003 back to Kenya, who signed for Kangemi United. Makacha played two years with Kangemi United in the Kenyan Premier League and signed in September 2005 for League rival Mathare United. With Mathare United he won the League title and was a front-runner for Kenyan Premier League's Player of the Year Award.

The currently best Kenyan player joined on 9 April 2009 for a three-week trial period to Superettan club IK Sirius. The Harambee Stars midfielder now is officially a member of the squad for IK Sirius in the Swedish Superettan and was signed on 24 April 2009. According to Johan Gille, the Communications Director of IK Sirius, Makacha's contracts begins with immediate effect. After one season left Swedish side IK Sirius and returned to Kenya, who signed for Mathare United. On 11 January 2012, Coach Gabriel "Kingi" Njoroge said Makacha has been allowed to leave and is free to join any club of his choice. The player, according to the coach, was considered surplus to requirements. Other Mathare United player released include Simon Mburu, Jacob Kelly, Barnabas Omondi, and Ato Ayong.

== International career ==
Makacha has played 26 international matches and scored 11 goals for Kenya, on 19 March 2009 was suspended from the national team.

== Honours ==
- 2008: Kenyan Premier League
- 2008: Best Midfielder of the Kenyan Premier League
