= Pascal Anicet =

Nigerian football midfielder

Personal information
- Date of birth: March 27, 1983 (age 43)
- Place of birth: Zinder, Niger
- Height: 1.75 m (5 ft 9 in)
- Position: Midfielder

Senior career*
Years	Team	Apps	(Gls)
2002–2005	Alkali Nassara Zinder		
2005–2013	AS-FNIS		

International career
2002–2008	Niger	6	(1)
- * Club domestic league appearances and goals as of January 27, 2007

Pascal Anicet (born March 27, 1983, in Niger) is a Nigerian football midfielder who plays for AS-FNIS in the Niger Premier League and formerly for Alkali Nassara Zinder. He is a member of the Niger national football team, he was member with the team by Tournoi de l'UEMOA 2007.
