= Labama Bokota =

Rwandan footballer

Personal information
- Full name: Bokota Kamana Labama
- Date of birth: 6 April 1985 (age 41)
- Place of birth: Kinshasa, Zaire
- Height: 1.87 m (6 ft 2 in)
- Position: Striker

Team information
- Current team: Kiyovu Sports

Youth career
- 1996–2003: AS Vita Club

Senior career*
Years	Team	Apps	(Gls)
2004–2005	AS Vita Club	9	(3)
2005-2008	Rayon Sports	42	(18)
2008–2009	APR FC	24	(8)
2010	FC Les Stars		
2011	DC Motema Pembe		
2011–	Rayon Sports		
- Kiyovu Sports
- muhanga fc
- FC Mont bleu de bunia

International career^{‡}
2007–	Rwanda	33	(13)
- * Club domestic league appearances and goals ‡ National team caps and goals as of 6 April 2017

Bokota Kamana Labama (born 6 April 1985 in Kinshasa) is a naturalized Rwandan football player who plays for Rayon Sport.

== Club career ==
Bokota played formerly for Rayon Sport and Armée Patriotique Rwandaise FC. He won the SMS Media footballer of the year award during his first stint with Rayon.

Bokota received a one-year ban from the Rwandese Association Football Federation in 2009, and he moved to DR Congo to play for local sides FC Les Stars and DC Motema Pembe. In August 2011, he signed a two-year contract with Rayon Sport, beginning a second stint with the Rwandan club.

On 8 August 2012, Amavubi striker Bokota Labama has joined Kiyovu Sports on a one-year deal.

== International career ==
Bokota is currently member of the Rwanda national football team. His country of birth is the Democratic Republic of Congo.

=== International goals ===
Scores and results list Rwanda's goal tally first.

No	Date	Venue	Opponent	Score	Result	Competition
1.	8 September 2007	Amahoro Stadium, Kigali, Rwanda	Liberia	1–0	4–0	2008 Africa Cup of Nations qualification
2.	9 December 2007	National Stadium, Dar es Salaam, Tanzania	Eritrea	2–1	2–1	2007 CECAFA Cup
3.	13 December 2007	National Stadium, Dar es Salaam, Tanzania	Djibouti	3–0	9–0	2007 CECAFA Cup
4.	13 December 2007	National Stadium, Dar es Salaam, Tanzania	Djibouti	4–0	9–0	2007 CECAFA Cup
5.	13 December 2007	National Stadium, Dar es Salaam, Tanzania	Djibouti	8–0	9–0	2007 CECAFA Cup
6.	31 May 2008	Stade Régional Nyamirambo, Kigali, Rwanda	Mauritania	3–0	3–0	2010 FIFA World Cup qualification
7.	14 June 2008	Stade Régional Nyamirambo, Kigali, Rwanda	Morocco	2–0	3–1	2010 FIFA World Cup qualification
8.	5 January 2009	Mandela National Stadium, Kampala, Uganda	Somalia	3–0	3–0	2008 CECAFA Cup
9.	9 January 2009	Mandela National Stadium, Kampala, Uganda	Zanzibar	1–0	3–0	2008 CECAFA Cup
10.	5 June 2011	Prince Louis Rwagasore Stadium, Bujumbura, Burundi	Burundi	1–1	1–3	2012 Africa Cup of Nations qualification
11.	15 November 2011	Amahoro Stadium, Kigali, Rwanda	Eritrea	3–0	3–1	2014 FIFA World Cup qualification
12.	2 December 2011	National Stadium, Dar es Salaam, Tanzania	Djibouti	1–0	5–2	2011 CECAFA Cup
13.	10 June 2012	Amahoro Stadium, Kigali, Rwanda	Benin	1–1	1–1	2014 FIFA World Cup qualification
