= Rudolf Bester =

Namibian football striker

Personal information
- Date of birth: 19 July 1983 (age 43)
- Place of birth: Otjiwarongo, South-West Africa
- Height: 1.69 m (5 ft 7 in)
- Position: Forward

Senior career*
Years	Team	Apps	(Gls)
2003–2006	Blue Waters	–	(–)
2006–2007	Eleven Arrows	–	(–)
2008	Čukarički	23	(2)
2009	Eleven Arrows	–	(–)
2009–2011	Maritzburg United	52	(13)
2011–2014	Orlando Pirates	20	(1)
2013–2014	→ Golden Arrows (loan)	18	(3)
2014–2015	Free State Stars	8	(0)
2015–2016	Moroka Swallows	7	(0)
2016–2017	Alexandra Black Aces	–	(–)

International career
2004–2014	Namibia	46	(13)
- * Club domestic league appearances and goals

Rudolf Bester (born 19 July 1983) is a retired Namibian professional football forward who last played for Alexandra Black Aces.

== Career ==
He previously played for Serbian SuperLiga club FK Čukarički, having joined the team in January 2008 from Eleven Arrows.

He was a part of the Namibian squad at the 2008 African Cup of Nations. He has a record of 13 goals for Namibia and is currently the highest national top goal scorer, ahead of retired Gerros Uri-khob with 12 and Ruben Van Wyk with 11 goals. Despite coming on for Orlando Pirates as a substitute in various games, Bester once gave Pirates an important victory in the last games of the 2011/12 league season. The win came at a crucial time and contributed to the team's league title. Pirates were held 1–1 by Cosmos and in the dying minutes of the second half, he scored a winning cracker to give the defending champions a 3-point lead on top of the table against relegation bound Jomo Cosmos in the 2011/12 season.

In June 2012, Bester missed three important international matches due to Injury. He was expected to play for Namibia's Brave Warriors in the 2014 Brazil World Cup Qualifiers against Nigeria, Kenya and 2013 African Cup of Nations qualifier against Liberia. He recovered from the injury and returned to international duty in a friendly against Rwanda on Saturday, 13 October 2012, in Windhoek. He is one of the few Namibians to play professional football outside Namibia, the first Namibian to win the PSL with Pirates and the first Namibian to play against Tottenham Hotspur of England.

His name is occasionally spelled as Rudolph in some sources.

== Honours ==
- Premier Soccer League (1):
  - 2011–12
- MTN 8 (1):
  - 2011
- Telkom Knockout Cup (1):
  - 2011

== International goals ==
Scores and results list Namibia's goal tally first.

#	Date	Venue	Opponent	Score	Result	Competition
1.	23 July 2006	Independence Stadium, Windhoek	Malawi	2–1	3–2	2006 COSAFA Cup
2.	6 July 2007	Kamuzu Stadium, Blantyre	Malawi	2–1	2–1	Friendly
3.	8 September 2007	Addis Ababa Stadium, Addis Ababa	Ethiopia	1–1	3–2	2008 Africa Cup of Nations qualification
4.	8 September 2007	Addis Ababa Stadium, Addis Ababa	Ethiopia	2–2	3–2	2008 Africa Cup of Nations qualification
5.	14 June 2008	Sam Nujoma Stadium, Windhoek	Guinea	1–1	1–2	2010 FIFA World Cup qualification
6.	11 October 2008	Sam Nujoma Stadium, Windhoek	Zimbabwe	2–0	4–2	2010 FIFA World Cup qualification
7.	1 April 2009	Saida Municipal Stadium, Saida	Lebanon	1–0	1–1	Friendly
8.	6 June 2009	Independence Stadium, Windhoek	DR Congo	2–0	4–0	Friendly
9.	4 September 2009	Sam Nujoma Stadium, Windhoek	Swaziland	1–0	1–1	Friendly
10.	3 March 2010	Moses Mabhida Stadium, Durban	South Africa	1–0	1–1	Friendly
11.	11 November 2011	Stade National Gouled, Djibouti	Djibouti	1–0	4–0	2014 FIFA World Cup qualification
12.	11 November 2011	Stade National Gouled, Djibouti	Djibouti	3–0	4–0	2014 FIFA World Cup qualification
13.	17 May 2014	Sam Nujoma Stadium, Windhoek	Congo	1–0	1–0	2015 Africa Cup of Nations qualification
