= Bobo Bola =

Footballer (born 1985)

Boba Bola
Personal information
- Date of birth: 2 October 1985 (age 41)
- Place of birth: Kinshasa, Zaire
- Height: 1.87 m (6 ft 2 in)
- Position: Forward

Youth career
- 1999–2004: APR FC

Senior career*
| Years | Team | Apps | (Gls) |
| 2004 | APR FC | 6 | (9) |
| 2005–2008 | Landskrona BoIS | 26 | (3) |
| 2007 | → Bodens BK (loan) | 8 | (5) |
| 2009 | Syrianska IF | 3 | (1) |
| 2010 | Panellinios IF | 2 | (1) |
| 2010–2011 | Atlantis FC | 32 | (14) |
| 2012 | IFK Lidingö | | |
| 2013 | Värtans IK | | (4) |
| 2015 | Kongo United FC | | |

International career
| 2005–2010 | Rwanda | 23 | (8) |
- * Club domestic league appearances and goals

Boba Bola (born 2 October 1985) is a former professional footballer who played as a forward. Born in Zaire, he represented the Rwanda national team at international level.

== Cub career ==
Bola joined Landskrona BoIS 2005, coming from APR FC. He was close to be loaned out to the Swedish side IF Limhamn Bunkeflo but the affair did not go off, instead he was loaned out to Bodens BK. He made 26 appearances and scored 3 goals for Landskrona BoIS, before he left on 22 December 2008. He was promoted after the 2008 season to the reserve team of Landskrona BoIS and was than on trial with Motala AIF. In summer 2009 and a half year for Landskrona BoIS II he signed a contract for Syrianska IF Kerburan. In March 2010, after being released by Syrianska IF he signed for Panellinios IF. In August 2010 he signed a contract for Finnish Atlantis FC.

== International career ==
Born in Zaire, Bola represented the Rwanda national team at full international level and was a key player for Amavubi.
