= Carlos Chimomole =

Mozambican footballer

Personal information
- Full name: Carlos Bernardo Chimomole
- Date of birth: April 4, 1984 (age 42)
- Place of birth: Maputo, Mozambique
- Height: 1.82 m (6 ft 0 in)
- Position: Midfielder

Senior career*
Years	Team	Apps	(Gls)
2004-2007	Desportivo de Maputo		
2007-2008	SuperSport United		
2008-2012	Liga Muçulmana de Maputo		
2013	Ferroviário de Beira		
2014	CD Maxaquene		
2015	Desportivo de Maputo		
2016	Ferroviário de Maputo		
2016-2017	UP Lichinga		
2018	Ferroviário de Nacala		

International career
2007-2012	Mozambique	24	(0)
- * Club domestic league appearances and goals

Carlos Bernardo "Carlitos" Chimomole (born April 4, 1984) is a Mozambican footballer who plays for Liga Muçulmana de Maputo and Mozambique. His position is midfielder.

== Clubs ==
- 2004-2007: (Mozambique) Desportivo de Maputo
- 2007-2008: (South Africa) Supersport United
- 2008-2012: (Mozambique) Liga Muçulmana de Maputo
- 2013: (Mozambique) Ferroviário de Beira
- 2014: (Mozambique) CD Maxaquene
- 2015: (Mozambique) Desportivo de Maputo
- 2016: (Mozambique) Ferroviário de Maputo
- 2016-2017: (Mozambique) UP Lichinga
- 2018: (Mozambique) Ferroviário de Nacala

== Honours ==
=== Club ===
Liga Muçulmana de Maputo

- Moçambola: Champions - 2010, 2011

Ferroviário de Beira

- Moçambola: Champions - 2013

CD Maxaquene

- Moçambola: Champions - 2014
