= Andualem Negusse =

Ethiopian footballer

Personal information
- Full name: Andualem Nigussie
- Date of birth: 15 June 1985 (age 41)
- Place of birth: Asella, Ethiopia
- Height: 1.73 m (5 ft 8 in)
- Position: Winger

Team information
- Current team: Saint-George SA
- Number: 2

Youth career
- –2002: Muger Cement

Senior career*
| Years | Team | Apps | (Gls) |
| 2002–2004 | Muger Cement | | |
| 2004–present | Saint-George SA | | |

International career
| 2003– | Ethiopia | | |
- * Club domestic league appearances and goals as of 31 August 2007

Andualem Nigussie (Amharic: ዓንዱኣለም ንጉሴ, is an Ethiopian footballer currently playing for Kenbata shinshico Kenema.

Andualem is offensive midfielder who currently plays as a striker; he is a regular member of the national team. He began his career at Muger Cement before joining Saint-George FC in 2022. He is currently playing for Kembata shinshicho kenema FC.
