= Panellinios IF =

Swedish football club

- Full name: Panellinios Idrottsförening
- Nickname: PIF
- Founded: 2002
- Ground: Vårbergs IP; Stockholm; Sweden
- Capacity: 1,000
- Chairman: Georgios Karamouzis
- Head coach: Kostantinos Stilas
- League: Division 3 Östra Svealand
- 2009: Division 2 Södra Svealand, 12th (Relegated)
Home colours

Panellinios IF is a Swedish football club located in Stockholm.

== Background ==
Panellinios Idrottsförening (PIF) is a club with Greek roots, based among Greeks in Sweden, that was formed in late 2002. In their first year, 2003, the team played in Division 6 and subsequently advanced through the divisions reaching Division 2 in 2008. The Panellinios IF youth section has expanded in recent years and for the 2010 season the club had five teams catering for a total of 100 youngsters.

Since their foundation Panellinios IF has participated mainly in the middle and lower divisions of the Swedish football league system. The club currently plays in Division 3 Östra Svealand which is the fifth tier of Swedish football. However PIF finished in 12th position and will be relegated back to Division 4 for the 2011 season. They play their home matches at the Vårbergs IP in Stockholm.

Panellinios IF are affiliated to the Stockholms Fotbollförbund.

== Season to season ==
Season	Level	Division	Section	Position	Movements
2003	Tier 7	Division 6	Stockholm D	1st	Promoted
2004	Tier 6	Division 5	Stockholm Södra	2nd	Promoted
2005	Tier 5	Division 4	Stockholm Södra	5th	
2006*	Tier 6	Division 4	Stockholm Södra	2nd	Promotion Playoffs – Promoted
2007	Tier 5	Division 3	Östra Svealand	1st	Promoted
2008	Tier 4	Division 2	Södra Svealand	10th	Relegation Playoffs
2009	Tier 4	Division 2	Södra Svealand	12th	Relegated
2010	Tier 5	Division 3	Östra Svealand	12th	Relegated

* League restructuring in 2006 resulted in a new division being created at Tier 3 and subsequent divisions dropping a level.
