= José Semedo (footballer, born 1979) =

Footballer (born 1979)

Personal information
- Full name: José Filipe Correia Semedo
- Date of birth: 26 December 1979 (age 46)
- Place of birth: Lisbon, Portugal
- Height: 1.69 m (5 ft 7 in)
- Position: Forward

Youth career
- 1991–1995: Amoreiras
- 1995–1998: Futebol Benfica

Senior career*
Years	Team	Apps	(Gls)
1998–2001	Futebol Benfica		
2001–2008	Odivelas	170	(61)
2008–2009	Rio Ave	14	(2)
2009–2010	APOP	37	(26)
2010–2011	Apollon Limassol	25	(5)
2011–2012	Enosis	23	(9)
2012–2013	Nea Salamis	12	(0)
2013	Tirana	9	(2)
2014	Omonia Aradippou	6	(6)
2014–2015	1º Dezembro	21	(4)
2015–2016	Casa Pia	24	(4)
2016–2021	Futebol Benfica	65	(14)
Total		406	(133)

International career
2008–2010	Cape Verde	2	(1)
- * Club domestic league appearances and goals

José Filipe Correia Semedo (born 26 December 1979) is a former professional footballer who played as a forward. Born in Portugal, he made two appearances for the Cape Verde national team scoring once.

== Club career ==
Born in Lisbon, Portugal, Semedo started his senior career with local amateurs C.F. Benfica, signing for neighbouring Odivelas F.C. in 2001. After stellar performances with the latter in the third division (18 goals in 29 matches in the 2007–08 season), he attracted attention from Primeira Liga clubs, eventually joining Rio Ave FC. In his first appearance in the competition, on 24 August 2008, he scored in a 1–1 home draw against S.L. Benfica.

Semedo moved to Cyprus in January 2009, teaming up with several Portuguese players at APOP Kinyras FC. In May 2010, after two solid campaigns – including 22 First Division goals in 2009–10, best in the competition – he stayed in the country with cup holders Apollon Limassol FC.

On 7 September 2013, Semedo joined Albanian Superliga side KF Tirana on a free transfer. He made his debut for the club on 29 September, playing 55 minutes in a 2–0 away defeat to KF Teuta Durrës. He scored his first goal of the season four days later, in a 1–0 victory over KS Kastrioti in which his team returned to winning ways after three consecutive losses; late into the month, in another game that finished with the same scoreline, he netted against KF Bylis Ballsh at Selman Stërmasi Stadium.

In December 2013, Semedo made his Albanian Cup debut with Tirana, appearing in a two-legged tie against KF Lushnja and featuring respectively 80 and 44 minutes in an eventual second round exit. He was released in the winter transfer window, scoring twice in 11 competitive appearances.

== International career ==
Born in Portugal, Semedo opted to represent Cape Verde internationally, starting in the 2010 FIFA World Cup qualifying stage. His debut occurred on 11 October 2008 in that competition, and he scored in a 3–1 loss in Tanzania.

Two years later, on 24 May 2010, Semedo won his second and last cap, against his birth country Portugal, coming on as a 25th-minute substitute in the goalless draw in Covilhã.

=== International goals ===
Scores and results list Cape Verde's goal tally first.

#	Date	Venue	Opponent	Score	Result	Competition
1.	11 October 2008	Benjamin Mkapa, Dar es Salaam, Tanzania	Tanzania	1–2	1–3	2010 World Cup qualification

== Honours ==
APOP

- Cypriot Cup: 2008–09

Apollon Limassol

- Cypriot Cup runner-up: 2010–11
