= Ismaël Alassane =

Nigerien footballer

Personal information
- Full name: Ismaël Eragae Alassane
- Date of birth: 3 April 1984 (age 42)
- Place of birth: Niger
- Height: 1.87 m (6 ft 2 in)
- Positions: Centre back; right back

Senior career*
| Years | Team | Apps | (Gls) |
| 2001–2002 | JS du Ténéré | | |
| 2003–2004 | Sahel SC | | |
| 2004–2008 | ASFA Yennega | | |
| 2008–2009 | Enyimba International F.C. | | |
| 2009–2011 | Al-Busaiteen | | |
| 2011–2012 | Al Sahel | | |
| 2012–2013 | AS Mangasport | | |

International career
| 2002–2013 | Niger | 38 | (8) |
- * Club domestic league appearances and goals

Ismaël Eragae Alassane (born 3 April 1984) is a Nigerien footballer. He plays as a centre back.

== Career ==
The defender has played for JS du Ténéré, Sahel SC ASFA Yennega and Enyimba International F.C.

While playing for ASFA Yennega, Alassane scored a penalty as the club lost in the 2007 CAF Champions League preliminary round.

== International career ==
He was a member of the Niger national football team.
