= Kangemi United F.C. =

Kenyan football club

Kangemi United Football Club is a football club in Nairobi, Kenya. In the 2006–07 season they played in the top level of Kenyan professional football, the Kenyan Premier League. However the club were disqualified from the league and forcibly relegated as punishment for failing to turn up for several league matches. In 2008, the team played in the Kenyan Nationwide League.
