= Abdelhameed Amarri =

Sudanese football striker

Personal information
- Full name: Abdelhameed Amarri Abdelhameed
- Date of birth: August 24, 1984 (age 42)
- Place of birth: Jeddah, Saudi Arabia
- Height: 1.74 m (5 ft 8 1/2 in)
- Position: Striker

Senior career*
Years	Team	Apps	(Gls)
2001-2002	Al-Amir SC (Bahri)		
2003-2010	Al-Merrikh SC	100	(60)
2011-2012	Al Khartoum SC		
2012	Al-Ahly Shendi		
2013	Muscat Club		
2013-2016	Al Rabita Kosti		
2017-2019	Al-Amir SC (Bahri)		

International career^{‡}
2004-2011	Sudan	27	(8)
Medal record
Men's football
Representing Sudan
CECAFA Cup
Winner	2007 Tanzania
Third place	2004 Ethiopia
- * Club domestic league appearances and goals as of 7/3/2010 ‡ National team caps and goals as of 24/6/2024

Abdelhameed Amarri (Arabic: عبد الحميد السعودي)is a Sudanese football striker. He currently plays for Khartoum.

Amarri also played for the Sudan national team. In the 2007 Cecafa Cup, he helped the squad win the tournament and was named the top scorer.

== Honours ==
Al-Merrikh SC

- Sudan Premier League: 2008
- Sudan Cup: 2005, 2006, 2007, 2008

Sudan

- CECAFA Cup: 2007; 3rd place 2004
