= ASAF Zinder =

Nigerien football club

- Full name: Association Sportive des Amis de la Fada de Zinder
- Founded: 1998
Home colours	Away colours

Association Sportive des Amis de la Fada de Zinder or simply ASAF Zinder is a Nigerien football club based in Zinder, a town approximately 14 hours east of the capital Niamey. The team competes in the Niger Premier League on past.

The club was founded in 1998.
