= Cheikh Gueye =

Senegalese footballer (born 1986)

Personal information
- Full name: Cheikh Matar Gueye
- Date of birth: 30 December 1986 (age 39)
- Place of birth: Thiès, Senegal
- Height: 1.80 m (5 ft 11 in)
- Position: Full back

Team information
- Current team: FCE Mérignac-Arlac

Youth career
- –2003: US Rail

Senior career*
Years	Team	Apps	(Gls)
2003–2005	ASC Diaraf		
2005–2006	Metz B		
2006–2011	Metz	145	(2)
2011–2014	Dynamo Dresden	70	(1)
2014	CFR Cluj	0	(0)
2015–2016	JA Drancy	18	(3)
2017–	FCE Mérignac-Arlac		

International career^{‡}
2008	Senegal	4	(1)
- * Club domestic league appearances and goals as of 10 September 2016 ‡ National team caps and goals as of 7 August 2011

Cheikh Matar Gueye (born 30 December 1986 in Thiès) is a Senegalese professional footballer who plays as a full back for French lower league side FCE Mérignac-Arlac.
