= Costa Khaiseb =

Namibian footballer (born 1980)

Personal information
- Full name: Costa Khaiseb
- Date of birth: 23 November 1980 (age 45)
- Place of birth: Windhoek, South West Africa
- Height: 1.80 m (5 ft 11 in)
- Position: Striker

Senior career*
| Years | Team | Apps | (Gls) |
| 2002–2004 | Ramblers | | |
| 2004–2006 | Civics Windhoek | | |
| 2006/07 | Black Leopards | 4 | (1) |
| 2007/08 | → FC AK Roodeport(loan) | | |
| 2006–2009 | Ramblers | | |
| 2009 | ASA | | |
| 2010– | Civics Windhoek | | |

International career^{‡}
| 2003– | Namibia | 8 | (1) |
- * Club domestic league appearances and goals as of August 19, 2009 ‡ National team caps and goals as of March 3, 2010

Costa Khaiseb (born November 23, 1980, in Windhoek) is a Namibian football striker and part of the Namibia national football team. He played for Namibian club Ramblers from 2002 to 2006, for Black Leopards in 06–07 season and came back to Ramblers where he played until the end of a season 2009–2010. He was a part of the Namibian squad in qualifiers for World cup 2010.
