= Shadrack Nsajigwa =

Tanzanian footballer

Personal information
- Date of birth: 10 February 1984 (age 42)
- Place of birth: Dar es Salaam, Tanzania
- Height: 1.63 m (5 ft 4 in)
- Position: Right back

Senior career*
Years	Team	Apps	(Gls)
2004–2005	Prisons FC Mbeya		
2006–2012	Young Africans FC		
2013–2014	Saraswoti Youth Club		

International career
2002–2012	Tanzania	51	(2)
- * Club domestic league appearances and goals

Shadrack Nsajigwa (born 10 February 1984) is a retired Tanzanian footballer who played club football for Young Africans FC and international football for Tanzania.

== International goals ==
#	Date	Venue	Opponent	Score	Result	Competition
1	December 8, 2010	Dar es Salaam	Rwanda	1–0	Win	Cecafa 2010
2	December 12, 2010	Dar es Salaam	Ivory Coast	1–0	Win	Cecafa 2010
