= Wesley Marquette =

Mauritian footballer

Personal information
- Full name: Wesley Marquette
- Date of birth: 8 January 1982 (age 44)
- Place of birth: Mauritius
- Position: Forward

Team information
- Current team: AS Possession

Senior career*
Years	Team	Apps	(Gls)
2005–2006	US Beau Bassin/Rose Hill		
2006–2007	Savanne SC		
2007–2009	Curepipe Starlight SC		(14)
2009–2010	SS Capricorne		
2011–	AS Possession		

International career
2006–	Mauritius	11	(3)
- * Club domestic league appearances and goals

Wesley Marquette (born 8 January 1982 in Mauritius) is a football player who played for AS Possession in the Réunion Premier League and for the Mauritius national football team as a forward. He is featured on the Mauritian national team in the official 2010 FIFA World Cup video game.
