= Joseph Kamwendo =

Malawian footballer

Personal information
- Full name: Joseph Kamwendo
- Date of birth: 23 October 1986 (age 40)
- Place of birth: Blantyre, Malawi
- Height: 1.67 m (5 ft 5 1/2 in)
- Position: Midfielder

Senior career*
| Years | Team | Apps | (Gls) |
| 2003–2004 | Mighty Wanderers | | |
| 2004–2005 | CAPS United | | |
| 2005–2006 | Nordsjælland | 16 | (4) |
| 2006–2007 | Mighty Wanderers | | |
| 2007–2011 | Orlando Pirates | 33 | (0) |
| 2010–2011 | → Vasco da Gama (loan) | 21 | (1) |
| 2011–2013 | Mighty Wanderers | | |
| 2013 | LD Maputo | | |
| 2013–2016 | TP Mazembe | 13 | (0) |
| 2015–2016 | → Don Bosco (loan) | | |
| 2016–2018 | Mighty Wanderers | | |
| 2019 | Tshakhuma | 1 | (0) |
| 2019 | Mighty Wanderers | | |

International career
| 2003–2016 | Malawi | 104 | (6) |
- * Club domestic league appearances and goals

Joseph Kamwendo (born 23 October 1986) is a Malawian retired international footballer. He is now a caretaker coach at a Lilongwe-based team Creck Sporting.

== Career ==
Kamwendo was the first foreigner to be bestowed the Soccer Star of the Year in Zimbabwe. In 2005, he received the award as a player of CAPS United.

In November 2013, he joined TP Mazembe on a five-year deal.

On 23 December 2019, 33-year old Kamwendo announced his retirement from football.After hanging up his boots, Kamwendo transitioned into coaching where he has gained valuable experience with several teams, including Mighty Wanderers, Bangwe United and currently Creck Sporting.

== See also ==
- List of men's footballers with 100 or more international caps
