= Jerson Tegete =

Tanzanian footballer

Personal information
- Date of birth: 7 October 1988 (age 38)
- Place of birth: Tanzania
- Position: Forward

Team information
- Current team: Alliance Academy

Youth career
- Makongo Academy

Senior career*
Years	Team	Apps	(Gls)
2007–2015	Young Africans		
2015–2017	Mwadui United		
2017–2018	Maji Maji		
2018–2019	Kagera Sugar		
2019–	Alliance Academy		

International career^{‡}
2006–2011	Tanzania	23	(8)
- * Club domestic league appearances and goals as of 1 August 2020 ‡ National team caps and goals as of 1 August 2020

Jerson Tegete (born 7 October 1988) is a Tanzanian footballer who currently plays for Alliance Academy and formerly the Tanzania national football team.

He appeared in 2 of the 3 qualification matches for the 2010 FIFA World Cup scoring 2 goals.

Scores and results list Tanzania's goal tally first, score column indicates score after each Tegete goal.

List of international goals scored by Jerson Tegete
No.	Date	Venue	Opponent	Score	Result	Competition	Ref.
1	1 December 2006	Addis Ababa Stadium, Addis Ababa, Ethiopia	Djibouti	3-0	3-0	2006 CECAFA Cup	
2	5 December 2006	Addis Ababa Stadium, Addis Ababa, Ethiopia	Rwanda	1-0	1-2	2006 CECAFA Cup	
3	6 September 2008	Stade George V, Curepipe, Mauritius	Mauritius	3-1	4-1	2010 FIFA World Cup qualification	
4	6 September 2008	Stade George V, Curepipe, Mauritius	Mauritius	4-1	4-1	2010 FIFA World Cup qualification	
5	11 October 2008	Benjamin Mkapa Stadium, Dar es Salaam, Tanzania	Cape Verde	2-0	3-1	2010 FIFA World Cup qualification	
6	13 January 2009	Mandela National Stadium, Kira Town, Uganda	Burundi	2-2	3-2	2008 CECAFA Cup	
7	3 June 2009	Benjamin Mkapa Stadium, Dar es Salaam, Tanzania	New Zealand	1-1	2-1	Friendly	
8	12 August 2009	Kigali Pelé Stadium, Kigali, Rwanda	Rwanda	2-1	2-1	Friendly	
