= Tesfaye Tafese =

Ethiopian footballer

Tafese Tesfaye
Personal information
- Full name: Tafese Tesfaye
- Date of birth: 10 June 1986 (age 40)
- Place of birth: Addis Ababa, Ethiopia
- Height: 1.75 m (5 ft 9 in)
- Position: Striker

Team information
- Current team: Al-Tilal SC
- Number: 11

Senior career*
Years	Team	Apps	(Gls)
2004–2005	EEPCO F.C.		
2005–2010	Ethiopian Coffee		
2010–	Al-Tilal SC		(15)

International career^{‡}
2003–2016	Ethiopia	24	(6)
- * Club domestic league appearances and goals as of 4 March 2011 ‡ National team caps and goals as of 4 March 2011

Tesfaye Tafese (Amharic: ታፈሰ ተስፋዬ, born 10 June 1986) is an Ethiopian footballer currently playing for Al-Tilal SC in the Yemeni League.

== Club career ==
Tafase scored in the opening round of the 2011 AFC Cup group stage against I-League club Dempo however it was not enough as Al-Tilal lost 2–1.

== International career ==
Tafase has represented his country of Ethiopia on 11 occasions, scoring 3 goals, including once against Rwanda during a 2010 FIFA World Cup qualifying match.
