= Danny Mrwanda =

Tanzanian international footballer (born 1983)

Personal information
- Date of birth: 6 April 1983 (age 43)
- Place of birth: Arusha, Tanzania
- Height: 1.86 m (6 ft 1 in)
- Position: Striker

Team information
- Current team: Mbeya Kwanza

Senior career*
Years	Team	Apps	(Gls)
2003–2005	Arusha		
2006–2008	Simba		
2008–2009	Al Tadamon		
2009–2010	Simba		
2010–2012	Đồng Tâm Long An		
2012–2013	Simba		
2013	Ðà Nẵng		
2014	Đồng Tâm Long An		
2014–2015	Polisi		
2015–2016	Lipuli		
2016–2017	Kagera Sugar		
2017–2018	Maji Maji		
2018–2019	Njombe Mji		
2019–	Mbeya Kwanza		

International career^{‡}
2005–2011	Tanzania	29	(9)
- * Club domestic league appearances and goals as of 11:34, 5 August 2020 (UTC) ‡ National team caps and goals as of 17:44, 3 April 2011 (UTC)

Danny Mrwanda (born 6 April 1983) is a Tanzanian international footballer who plays as a striker for Mbeya Kwanza.

== Career ==
Mrwanda has played in Tanzania for Arusha and Simba, in Kuwait for Al Tadamon, and in Vietnam for Đồng Tâm Long An and Ðà Nẵng before returning home in 2014.

He made his international debut for Tanzania in 2005, and has appeared in FIFA World Cup qualifying matches for them.
