= Botswana at the Africa Cup of Nations =

Botswana is typically one of Africa's weaker footballing sides, and their performance in the Africa Cup of Nations is mostly limited to the qualification rounds. Botswana had remained in the shadow of many African countries in the stronger COSAFA region. However, Botswana did manage some impressive performances in the qualification for the 2012 Africa Cup of Nations, managing to finally qualify for their first AFCON tournament. Botswana then qualified for the second time in 2025.

== Participation history ==
Group D

Pos	Team	Pld	W	D	L	GF	GA	GD	Pts	Qualification
1	Ghana	3	2	1	0	4	1	+3	7	Advance to knockout stage
2	Mali	3	2	0	1	3	3	0	6	Advance to knockout stage
3	Guinea	3	1	1	1	7	3	+4	4	
4	Botswana	3	0	0	3	2	9	−7	0	

Updated to match(es) played on unknown. Source:
24 January 2012
17:00

Ghana	1–0	Botswana
John Mensah 25'	Report

Stade de Franceville, Franceville
Attendance: 5,000
Referee: Badara Diatta (Senegal)
24 January 2012
20:00

Mali	1–0	Guinea
B. Traoré 30'	Report

Stade de Franceville, Franceville
Attendance: 10,000
Referee: Slim Jedidi (Tunisia)
28 January 2012
17:00

Botswana	1–6	Guinea
Selolwane 23' (pen.)	Report	S. Diallo 15', 27'; A. R. Camara 42'; Traoré 45'; M. Bah 83'; Soumah 86'

Stade de Franceville, Franceville
Attendance: 4,000
Referee: Bouchaïb El Ahrach (Morocco)
28 January 2012
20:00

Ghana	2–0	Mali
Gyan 64'; A. Ayew 71'	Report

Stade de Franceville, Franceville
Attendance: 7,000
Referee: Djamel Haimoudi (Algeria)
1 February 2012
19:00

Botswana	1–2	Mali
Ngele 50'	Report	Dembélé 56'; Keita 75'

Stade d'Angondjé, Libreville
Attendance: 20,000
Referee: Khalid Abdel Rahman (Sudan)
1 February 2012
19:00

Ghana	1–1	Guinea
Agyemang-Badu 27'	Report	A. R. Camara 45'

Stade de Franceville, Franceville
Attendance: 5,500
Referee: Daniel Bennett (South Africa)

24 January 2012
Ghana	1–0	Botswana	Stade de Franceville, Franceville
Mali	1–0	Guinea	Stade de Franceville, Franceville
28 January 2012
Botswana	1–6	Guinea	Stade de Franceville, Franceville
Ghana	2–0	Mali	Stade de Franceville, Franceville
1 February 2012
Botswana	1–2	Mali	Stade d'Angondjé, Libreville
Ghana	1–1	Guinea	Stade de Franceville, Franceville

== Overall record ==
Africa Cup of Nations record
Year	Round	Position	Pld	W	D	L	GF	GA
(Sudan) 1957 to (Senegal) 1992	Did not enter							
(Tunisia) 1994 to (Angola) 2010	Did not qualify							
(Gabon) (Equatorial Guinea) 2012	Group stage	14th	3	0	0	3	2	9
(South Africa) 2013 to (Ivory Coast) 2023	Did not qualify							
(Morocco) 2025	Qualified							
(Kenya) (Tanzania) (Uganda) 2027	To be determined							
Total	Group stage	2/35	3	0	0	3	2	9

== AFCON history and squads ==
=== 2012 Africa Cup of Nations ===
==== Ghana vs. Botswana ====
24 January 2012
17:00

Ghana	1–0	Botswana
John Mensah 25'	Report

Stade de Franceville, Franceville
Attendance: 5,000
Referee: Badara Diatta (Senegal)

Ghana	Botswana

GK	16	Adam Larsen Kwarasey
DF	5	John Mensah (c)	(red card) 66'
DF	4	John Paintsil
DF	21	John Boye
DF	7	Samuel Inkoom
MF	11	Sulley Muntari		(substituted off) 72'
MF	6	Anthony Annan
MF	8	Emmanuel Agyemang-Badu
MF	3	Asamoah Gyan
FW	10	André Ayew		(substituted off) 88'
FW	13	Jordan Ayew		(substituted off) 59'
Substitutions:
DF	14	Masahudu Alhassan		(substituted in) 59'
DF	19	Jonathan Mensah		(substituted in) 72'
MF	23	Mohammed Abu		(substituted in) 88'
Manager:
(Serbia) Goran Stevanović

GK	16	Modiri Marumo
DF	5	Mompati Thuma (c)	(yellow card) 77'
DF	2	Ndiapo Letsholathebe
DF	3	Mosimanegape Ramohibidu
DF	22	Tshepo Motlhabankwe
MF	18	Mogogi Gabonamong
MF	8	Phenyo Mongala
MF	6	Ofentse Nato	(yellow card) 90+2'
MF	12	Patrick Motsepe		(substituted off) 65'
FW	10	Moemedi Moatlhaping
FW	9	Jerome Ramatlhakwane
Substitutions:
MF	19	Mogakolodi Ngele		(substituted in) 65'
Manager:
Stanley Tshosane

==== Botswana vs. Guinea ====
28 January 2012
17:00

Botswana	1–6	Guinea
Selolwane 23' (pen.)	Report	S. Diallo 15', 27'; A. R. Camara 42'; Traoré 45'; M. Bah 83'; Soumah 86'

Stade de Franceville, Franceville
Attendance: 4,000
Referee: Bouchaïb El Ahrach (Morocco)

Botswana	Guinea

GK	16	Modiri Marumo
DF	5	Mompati Thuma (c)
DF	2	Ndiapo Letsholathebe
DF	4	Mmusa Ohilwe	(yellow card) 51'
DF	22	Tshepo Motlhabankwe	(yellow card) 28'
MF	11	Dipsy Selolwane
MF	18	Mogogi Gabonamong
MF	8	Phenyo Mongala		(substituted off) 72'
MF	6	Ofentse Nato		(substituted off) 38'
FW	9	Jerome Ramatlhakwane
FW	7	Pontsho Moloi		(substituted off) 46'
Substitutions:
MF	12	Patrick Motsepe	(red card) 45'	(substituted in) 38'
MF	13	Boitumelo Mafoko		(substituted in) 46'
MF	19	Mogakolodi Ngele		(substituted in) 72'
Manager:
Stanley Tshosane

GK	1	Naby Yattara	(yellow card) 21'
DF	5	Bobo Baldé
DF	6	Kamil Zayatte (c)	(yellow card) 22'
DF	18	Ibrahima Diallo
MF	2	Pascal Feindouno		(substituted off) 63'
MF	17	Thierno Bah
MF	4	Mamadou Bah
MF	8	Ibrahima Traoré		(substituted off) 68'
FW	10	Ismaël Bangoura
FW	7	Abdoul Camara
FW	9	Sadio Diallo		(substituted off) 79'
Substitutions:
MF	12	Ibrahima Conte		(substituted in) 63'
FW	19	Alhassane Bangoura		(substituted in) 68'
MF	14	Naby Soumah		(substituted in) 79'
Manager:
(France) Michel Dussuyer

==== Botswana vs. Mali ====
1 February 2012
19:00

Botswana	1–2	Mali
Ngele 50'	Report	Dembélé 56'; Keita 75'

Stade d'Angondjé, Libreville
Attendance: 20,000
Referee: Khalid Abdel Rahman (Sudan)

Botswana	Mali

GK	16	Modiri Marumo
DF	5	Mompati Thuma (c)
DF	2	Ndiapo Letsholathebe
DF	4	Mmusa Ohilwe
DF	22	Tshepo Motlhabankwe	(yellow card) 71'
MF	18	Mogogi Gabonamong
MF	13	Boitumelo Mafoko
MF	19	Mogakolodi Ngele		(substituted off) 87'
MF	21	Lemponye Tshireletso		(substituted off) 81'
FW	10	Moemedi Moatlhaping
FW	9	Jerome Ramatlhakwane		(substituted off) 87'
Substitutions:
MF	8	Phenyo Mongala		(substituted in) 81'
FW	14	Onalethata Thekiso		(substituted in) 87'
MF	11	Dipsy Selolwane		(substituted in) 87'
Manager:
Stanley Tshosane

GK	1	Oumar Sissoko
DF	5	Cédric Kanté (c)
DF	3	Adama Tamboura
DF	4	Ousmane Berthé
DF	14	Drissa Diakité		(substituted off) 59'
MF	12	Seydou Keita
MF	7	Abdou Traoré		(substituted off) 87'
MF	15	Bakaye Traoré
MF	18	Samba Sow	(yellow card) 63'
FW	10	Modibo Maïga
FW	11	Garra Dembélé		(substituted off) 73'
Substitutions:
DF	23	Ousmane Coulibaly		(substituted in) 59'
FW	9	Cheick Diabaté		(substituted in) 73'
FW	6	Mustapha Yatabaré		(substituted in) 87'
Manager:
(France) Alain Giresse
