= 2012 Africa Cup of Nations Group D =

Football tournament group stage

Group D of the 2012 Africa Cup of Nations ran from 24 January until 1 February. It consisted of Botswana, Ghana, Guinea and Mali. The matches were held in Gabon. Ghana and Mali progressed to the quarterfinals.

== Standings ==
Pos	Team	Pld	W	D	L	GF	GA	GD	Pts	Qualification
1	Ghana	3	2	1	0	4	1	+3	7	Advance to knockout stage
2	Mali	3	2	0	1	3	3	0	6	Advance to knockout stage
3	Guinea	3	1	1	1	7	3	+4	4	
4	Botswana	3	0	0	3	2	9	−7	0	

Source: CAF

All times are West Africa Time (UTC+1).

== Ghana vs. Botswana ==
24 January 2012
17:00

Ghana	1–0	Botswana
John Mensah 25'	Report

Stade de Franceville, Franceville
Attendance: 5,000
Referee: Badara Diatta (Senegal)

Ghana	Botswana

GK	16	Adam Larsen Kwarasey
DF	5	John Mensah (c)	(red card) 66'
DF	4	John Paintsil
DF	21	John Boye
DF	7	Samuel Inkoom
MF	11	Sulley Muntari		(substituted off) 72'
MF	6	Anthony Annan
MF	8	Emmanuel Agyemang-Badu
MF	3	Asamoah Gyan
FW	10	André Ayew		(substituted off) 88'
FW	13	Jordan Ayew		(substituted off) 59'
Substitutions:
DF	14	Masahudu Alhassan		(substituted on) 59'
DF	19	Jonathan Mensah		(substituted on) 72'
MF	23	Mohammed Abu		(substituted on) 88'
Manager:
(Serbia) Goran Stevanović

GK	16	Modiri Marumo
DF	5	Mompati Thuma (c)	(yellow card) 77'
DF	2	Ndiapo Letsholathebe
DF	3	Mosimanegape Ramohibidu
DF	22	Tshepo Motlhabankwe
MF	18	Mogogi Gabonamong
MF	8	Phenyo Mongala
MF	6	Ofentse Nato	(yellow card) 90+2'
MF	12	Patrick Motsepe		(substituted off) 65'
FW	10	Moemedi Moatlhaping
FW	9	Jerome Ramatlhakwane
Substitutions:
MF	19	Mogakolodi Ngele		(substituted on) 65'
Manager:
Stanley Tshosane

Assistant referees:
Djibril Camara (Senegal)
Redouane Achik (Morocco)
Fourth official:
Bouchaïb El Ahrach (Morocco)

== Mali vs. Guinea ==
24 January 2012
20:00

Mali	1–0	Guinea
B. Traoré 30'	Report

Stade de Franceville, Franceville
Attendance: 10,000
Referee: Slim Jedidi (Tunisia)

Mali	Guinea

GK	16	Soumbeyla Diakité
DF	5	Cédric Kanté (c)
DF	3	Adama Tamboura
DF	21	Mahamadou N'Diaye	(yellow card) 68'
DF	14	Drissa Diakité		(substituted off) 85'
MF	12	Seydou Keita
MF	7	Abdou Traoré
MF	15	Bakaye Traoré
MF	20	Samba Diakité	(yellow card) 67'	(substituted off) 73'
FW	10	Modibo Maïga
FW	9	Cheick Diabaté		(substituted off) 64'
Substitutions:
FW	11	Garra Dembélé		(substituted on) 64'
MF	18	Samba Sow		(substituted on) 73'
DF	23	Ousmane Coulibaly		(substituted on) 85'
Manager:
(France) Alain Giresse

GK	1	Naby Yattara
DF	5	Bobo Baldé
DF	6	Kamil Zayatte (c)
DF	18	Ibrahima Diallo	(yellow card) 38'
DF	20	Habib Baldé		(substituted off) 79'
MF	2	Pascal Feindouno
MF	17	Thierno Bah
MF	4	Mamadou Bah	(yellow card) 12'
MF	8	Ibrahima Traoré
MF	10	Ismaël Bangoura		(substituted off) 61'
FW	19	Alhassane Bangoura		(substituted off) 58'
Substitutions:
FW	7	Abdoul Camara		(substituted on) 58'
FW	21	Ousmane Barry		(substituted on) 61'
FW	9	Sadio Diallo		(substituted on) 79'
Manager:
(France) Michel Dussuyer

Assistant referees:
Bechir Hassani (Tunisia)
Felicien Kabanda (Rwanda)
Fourth official:
Eric Otogo-Castane (Gabon)

== Botswana vs. Guinea ==
28 January 2012
17:00

Botswana	1–6	Guinea
Selolwane 23' (pen.)	Report	S. Diallo 15', 27'; A. R. Camara 42'; Traoré 45'; M. Bah 83'; Soumah 86'

Stade de Franceville, Franceville
Attendance: 4,000
Referee: Bouchaïb El Ahrach (Morocco)

Botswana	Guinea

GK	16	Modiri Marumo
DF	5	Mompati Thuma (c)
DF	2	Ndiapo Letsholathebe
DF	4	Mmusa Ohilwe	(yellow card) 51'
DF	22	Tshepo Motlhabankwe	(yellow card) 28'
MF	11	Dipsy Selolwane
MF	18	Mogogi Gabonamong
MF	8	Phenyo Mongala		(substituted off) 72'
MF	6	Ofentse Nato		(substituted off) 38'
FW	9	Jerome Ramatlhakwane
FW	7	Pontsho Moloi		(substituted off) 46'
Substitutions:
MF	12	Patrick Motsepe	(red card) 45'	(substituted on) 38'
MF	13	Boitumelo Mafoko		(substituted on) 46'
MF	19	Mogakolodi Ngele		(substituted on) 72'
Manager:
Stanley Tshosane

GK	1	Naby Yattara	(yellow card) 21'
DF	5	Bobo Baldé
DF	6	Kamil Zayatte (c)	(yellow card) 22'
DF	18	Ibrahima Diallo
MF	2	Pascal Feindouno		(substituted off) 63'
MF	17	Thierno Bah
MF	4	Mamadou Bah
MF	8	Ibrahima Traoré		(substituted off) 68'
FW	10	Ismaël Bangoura
FW	7	Abdoul Camara
FW	9	Sadio Diallo		(substituted off) 79'
Substitutions:
MF	12	Ibrahima Conte		(substituted on) 63'
FW	19	Alhassane Bangoura		(substituted on) 68'
MF	14	Naby Soumah		(substituted on) 79'
Manager:
(France) Michel Dussuyer

Assistant referees:
Bechir Hassani (Tunisia)
Theophile Vinga (Gabon)
Fourth official:
Eddy Maillet (Seychelles)

== Ghana vs. Mali ==
28 January 2012
20:00

Ghana	2–0	Mali
Gyan 64'; A. Ayew 71'	Report

Stade de Franceville, Franceville
Attendance: 7,000
Referee: Djamel Haimoudi (Algeria)

Ghana	Mali

GK	16	Adam Larsen Kwarasey
DF	4	John Paintsil (c)	(yellow card) 48'
DF	21	John Boye
DF	19	Jonathan Mensah	(yellow card) 36'
DF	14	Masahudu Alhassan
MF	11	Sulley Muntari		(substituted off) 59'
MF	6	Anthony Annan		(substituted off) 90+4'
MF	20	Kwadwo Asamoah		(substituted off) 88'
MF	8	Emmanuel Agyemang-Badu
FW	3	Asamoah Gyan
FW	10	André Ayew
Substitutions:
MF	18	Charles Takyi		(substituted on) 59'
DF	7	Samuel Inkoom		(substituted on) 88'
MF	9	Derek Boateng		(substituted on) 90+4'
Manager:
(Serbia) Goran Stevanović

GK	16	Soumbeïla Diakité
DF	5	Cédric Kanté (c)
DF	3	Adama Tamboura
DF	4	Ousmane Berthé
DF	14	Drissa Diakité
MF	12	Seydou Keita	(yellow card) 40'
MF	7	Abdou Traoré		(substituted off) 85'
MF	15	Bakaye Traoré	(yellow card) 62'
MF	20	Samba Diakité	(yellow card) 52'
FW	10	Modibo Maïga		(substituted off) 71'
FW	9	Cheick Diabaté		(substituted off) 64'
Substitutions:
FW	11	Garra Dembélé		(substituted on) 64'
FW	6	Mustapha Yatabaré		(substituted on) 71'
MF	18	Samba Sow		(substituted on) 85'
Manager:
(France) Alain Giresse

Assistant referees:
Abdelhak Etchiali (Algeria)
Yanoussa Moussa (Cameroon)
Fourth official:
Hamada Nampiandraza (Madagascar)

== Botswana vs. Mali ==
1 February 2012
19:00

Botswana	1–2	Mali
Ngele 50'	Report	Dembélé 56'; Keita 75'

Stade d'Angondjé, Libreville
Attendance: 20,000
Referee: Khalid Abdel Rahman (Sudan)

Botswana	Mali

GK	16	Modiri Marumo
DF	5	Mompati Thuma (c)
DF	2	Ndiapo Letsholathebe
DF	4	Mmusa Ohilwe
DF	22	Tshepo Motlhabankwe	(yellow card) 71'
MF	18	Mogogi Gabonamong
MF	13	Boitumelo Mafoko
MF	19	Mogakolodi Ngele		(substituted off) 87'
MF	21	Lemponye Tshireletso		(substituted off) 81'
FW	10	Moemedi Moatlhaping
FW	9	Jerome Ramatlhakwane		(substituted off) 87'
Substitutions:
MF	8	Phenyo Mongala		(substituted on) 81'
FW	14	Onalethata Thekiso		(substituted on) 87'
MF	11	Dipsy Selolwane		(substituted on) 87'
Manager:
Stanley Tshosane

GK	1	Oumar Sissoko
DF	5	Cédric Kanté (c)
DF	3	Adama Tamboura
DF	4	Ousmane Berthé
DF	14	Drissa Diakité		(substituted off) 59'
MF	12	Seydou Keita
MF	7	Abdou Traoré		(substituted off) 87'
MF	15	Bakaye Traoré
MF	18	Samba Sow	(yellow card) 63'
FW	10	Modibo Maïga
FW	11	Garra Dembélé		(substituted off) 73'
Substitutions:
DF	23	Ousmane Coulibaly		(substituted on) 59'
FW	9	Cheick Diabaté		(substituted on) 73'
FW	6	Mustapha Yatabaré		(substituted on) 87'
Manager:
(France) Alain Giresse

Assistant referees:
Moffat Champiti (Malawi)
Balkrishna Bootun (Mauritius)
Fourth official:
Djamel Haimoudi (Algeria)

== Ghana vs. Guinea ==
1 February 2012
19:00

Ghana	1–1	Guinea
Agyemang-Badu 27'	Report	A. R. Camara 45'

Stade de Franceville, Franceville
Attendance: 5,500
Referee: Daniel Bennett (South Africa)

Ghana	Guinea

GK	16	Adam Larsen Kwarasey
DF	4	John Paintsil (c)
DF	15	Isaac Vorsah
DF	21	John Boye
DF	14	Masahudu Alhassan	(yellow card) 2'
DF	7	Samuel Inkoom
MF	6	Anthony Annan		(substituted off) 75'
MF	20	Kwadwo Asamoah
MF	8	Emmanuel Agyemang-Badu
FW	3	Asamoah Gyan		(substituted off) 74'
FW	10	André Ayew		(substituted off) 86'
Substitutions:
FW	12	Prince Tagoe		(substituted on) 74'
MF	9	Derek Boateng		(substituted on) 75'
MF	18	Charles Takyi		(substituted on) 86'
Manager:
(Serbia) Goran Stevanović

GK	1	Naby Yattara
DF	5	Bobo Baldé
DF	6	Kamil Zayatte (c)	(yellow card) 90'
DF	18	Ibrahima Diallo
MF	2	Pascal Feindouno	(yellow card) 20'	(substituted off) 75'
MF	17	Thierno Bah
MF	4	Mamadou Bah	(yellow card) 49' (yellow-red card) 69'
MF	8	Ibrahima Traoré		(substituted off) 76'
FW	10	Ismaël Bangoura		(substituted off) 83'
FW	7	Abdoul Camara
FW	9	Sadio Diallo
Substitutions:
DF	20	Habib Baldé		(substituted on) 75'
FW	19	Alhassane Bangoura		(substituted on) 76'
MF	14	Naby Soumah		(substituted on) 83'
Manager:
(France) Michel Dussuyer

Assistant referees:
Songuifolo Yeo (Ivory Coast)
Zakhele Siwela (South Africa)
Fourth official:
Bakary Gassama (Gambia)
