= Simisani Mathumo =

Motswana footballer

Personal information
- Date of birth: 11 November 1991 (age 34)
- Place of birth: Francistown, Botswana
- Height: 1.83 m (6 ft 0 in)
- Position: Centreback

Team information
- Current team: Township Rollers

Youth career
- 2005–2007: Township Rollers U19

Senior career*
Years	Team	Apps	(Gls)
2007–2019	Township Rollers		
2019	Free State Stars	11	(0)
2019–2020	Township Rollers		
2020–2021	Olympique Khouribga	0	(0)
2021–	Township Rollers	7	(0)

International career
2018–	Botswana	20	(0)
- * Club domestic league appearances and goals

Simisani Mathumo (born 11 November 1991) is a Motswana footballer who plays for Township Rollers FC and the Botswana national football team. Mathumo played briefly for the Botola side Olympique Khouribga in 2020.

Simisani began his football career in the Township Rollers academy in 2005. He was given his first senior appearance by then manager Madinda Ndlovu as a sixteen year old. After impressing Simisani would go on to become a mainstay in the Township Rollers FC defense, playing for them over twelve years and winning all of the cups on offer including six Premier Leagues, one FA Cup and two Mascom Top 8 Cups. In January 2019, he left Township Rollers Football Club to join South African side Free State Stars but his contract was terminated after the club was relegated from the Absa Premiership and he returned to Township Rollers FC in August 2019.

== Style of play ==
Throughout his career he has featured predominantly as a classic sweeper defender, mainly due to his mobility and ability to tackle. Due to his size and height he is also dependable for ball clearance and is a constant goal threat especially in setpieces.

== Honours ==
=== Clubs ===
Township Rollers

- Botswana Premier League:6

2009-10, 2010-11, 2013-14, 2015-16, 2016-17, 2017-18

- FA Cup:1

2009-10

- Mascom Top 8 Cup:2

2011-12, 2017-18

=== Individual honours ===
- FUB Player of the Season: 2017
- FUB Team of the Year: 2016, 2017
