= Sadio Diallo =

Guinean footballer

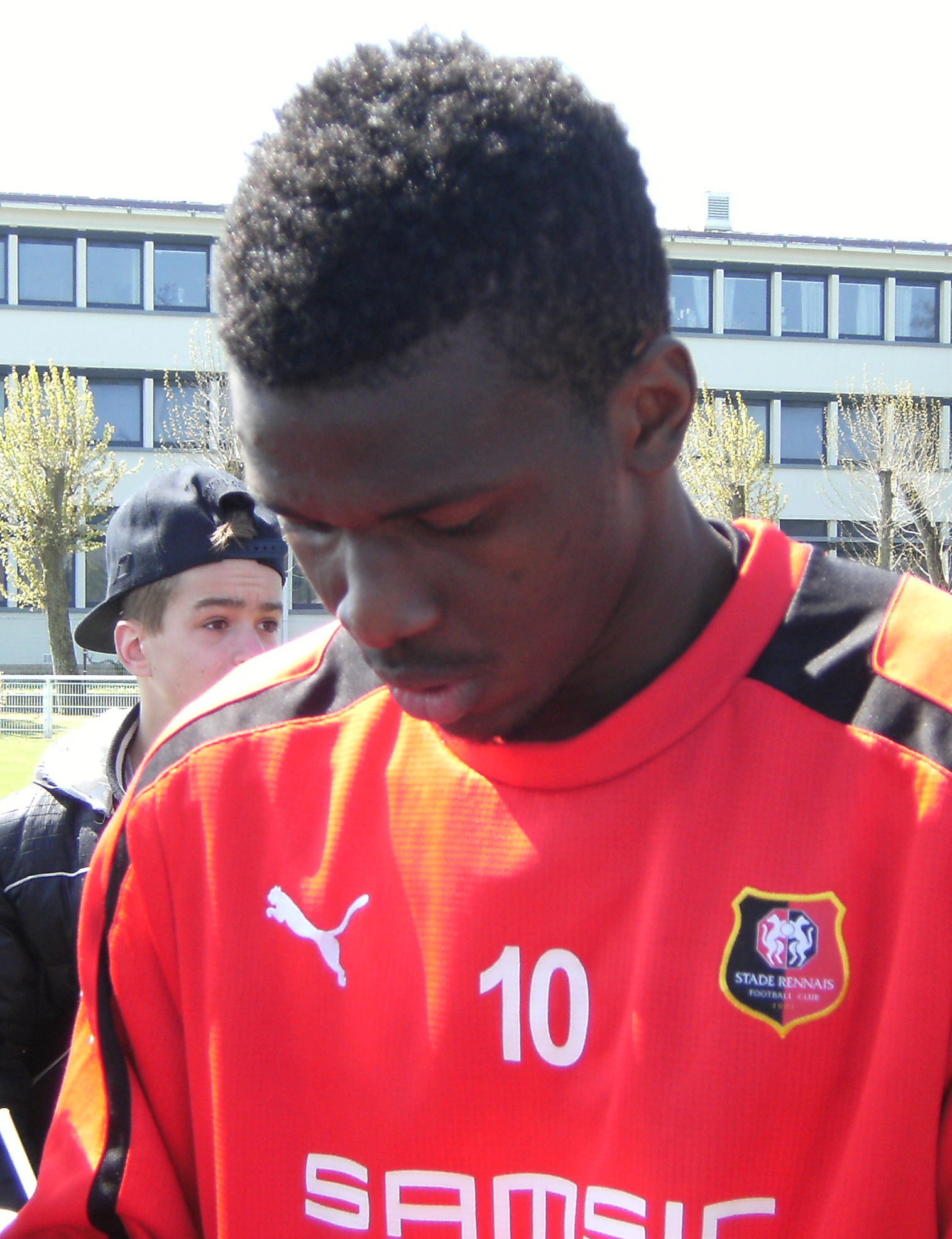
- Diallo training with Rennes in 2013

Personal information
- Full name: Abdoulaye Sadio Diallo
- Date of birth: 28 December 1990 (age 35)
- Place of birth: Conakry, Guinea
- Height: 1.82 m (6 ft 0 in)
- Position: Midfielder

Youth career
- Atlético Coléah

Senior career*
Years	Team	Apps	(Gls)
2009–2012	Bastia	67	(18)
2012–2015	Rennes	36	(0)
2012	→ Bastia (loan)	13	(3)
2013–2015	→ Lorient (loan)	36	(3)
2014–2015	→ Lorient B (loan)	4	(1)
2015–2017	Bastia	43	(5)
2017–2018	Yeni Malatyaspor	14	(0)
2018–2019	Hatayspor	22	(2)
2019–2020	Gençlerbirliği	6	(0)
2021	Ankara Keçiörengücü	7	(0)

International career
2010–2019	Guinea	36	(8)
- * Club domestic league appearances and goals

Abdoulaye Sadio Diallo (born 28 December 1990) commonly known as Sadio Diallo, is a Guinean former professional footballer who plays as a midfielder.

== Career ==
Diallo started his career for the Corsican club SC Bastia in the 2009–10 Ligue 2 season.

In 2010, he made his debut for the Guinea national team.

On 5 June 2011, Diallo scored the third goal in Guinea's 4–1 win over Madagascar which saw them move clear at the top of Group B of the Africa Cup of Nations qualifiers as Nigeria drew 2–2 in Ethiopia.

== Career statistics ==
Scores and results list Guinea's goal tally first, score column indicates score after each Diallo goal.

List of international goals scored by Sadio Diallo
No.	Date	Venue	Opponent	Score	Result	Competition
1	5 June 2011	Stade du 28 Septembre, Conakry, Guinea	Madagascar	3–1	4–1	2012 Africa Cup of Nations qualification
2	10 August 2011	Parc des Sports Michel Hidalgo, Saint-Leu-la-Forêt, France	Gabon	1–1	1–1	Friendly
3	28 January 2012	Stade de Franceville, Franceville, Gabon	Botswana	1–0	6–1	2012 Africa Cup of Nations
4	28 January 2012	Stade de Franceville, Franceville, Gabon	Botswana	2–1	6–1	2012 Africa Cup of Nations
5	26 May 2012	Stade Armand Micheletti, Amanvillers, France	Cameroon	1–1	1–2	Friendly
6	9 June 2013	Stade du 28 Septembre, Conakry, Guinea	Mozambique	2–0	6–1	2014 FIFA World Cup qualification
7	9 June 2013	Stade du 28 Septembre, Conakry, Guinea	Mozambique	3–1	6–1	2014 FIFA World Cup qualification
8	10 June 2017	Stade Bouaké, Bouaké, Ivory Coast	Ivory Coast	1–1	3–2	2019 Africa Cup of Nations qualification
