= Mamadou Bah =

Guinean footballer

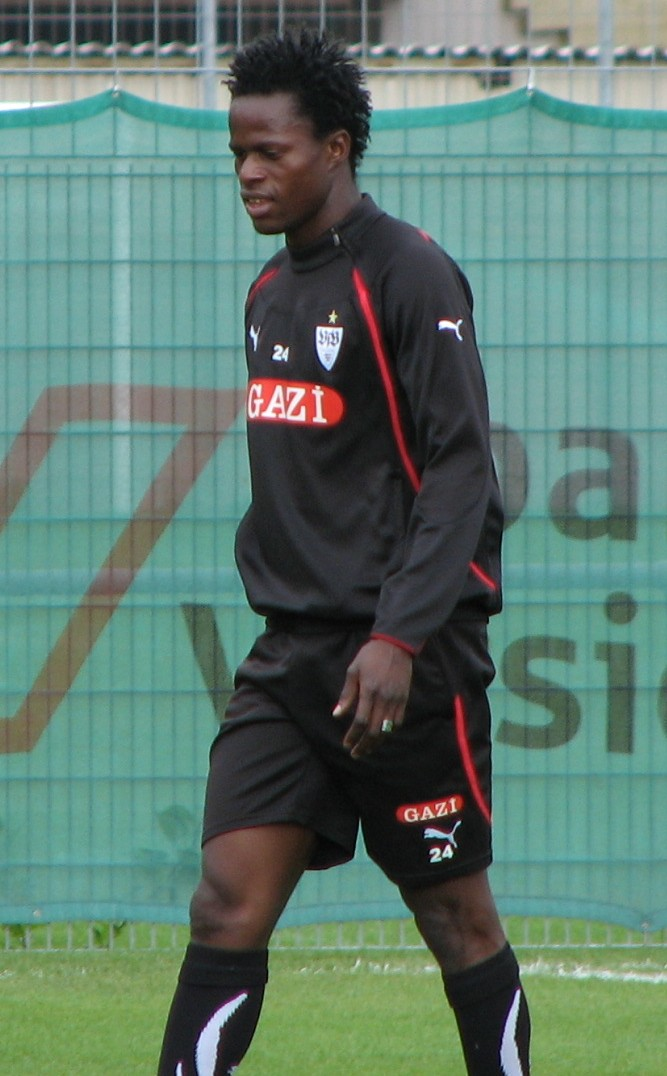
- Bah training with VfB Stuttgart

Personal information
- Full name: Mamadou Diouldé Bah
- Date of birth: 25 April 1988 (age 38)
- Place of birth: Conakry, Guinea
- Height: 1.85 m (6 ft 1 in)
- Position: Midfielder

Team information
- Current team: Raon-l'Étape

Youth career
- –2005: Friguiabé FC
- 2005–2006: Athlético de Coléah
- 2006–2007: Strasbourg

Senior career*
Years	Team	Apps	(Gls)
2007–2010	Strasbourg	62	(4)
2010–2013	VfB Stuttgart	6	(0)
2014–2015	Strasbourg	18	(1)
2016–2017	Vauban Strasbourg	13	(1)
2018–	Raon-l'Étape	45	(3)

International career
2008–2012	Guinea	33	(4)
- * Club domestic league appearances and goals as of 1 July 2022

Mamadou Diouldé Bah (born 25 April 1988) is a Guinean professional footballer who plays as a midfielder for US Raon-l'Étape. He played for the Guinea national team from 2008 to 2012.

== Club career ==
Born in Conakry, Bah began his career at Friguiabé FC before joining Athlético de Coléah in 2005. After one year, he left the club and joined the RC Strasbourg youth squad in 2006.

On 31 August 2010, Bah moved to VfB Stuttgart. However, he failed to find a regular first team place. On 4 September 2011, in the 2012 Africa Cup of Nations qualifying match against Ethiopia, he broke his left hand. Until the end of the 2012–13 season, Stuttgart decided not to offer him an extended contract leaving him a free agent.

On 5 January 2014, Bah rejoined his first professional club Strasbourg on a one-year-and-a-half contract.

== International career ==
Bah made his international debut for his homeland Guinea at the 2008 African Cup of Nations in Ghana, where Guinea was eliminated at the quarter-final by Côte d'Ivoire.

== Career statistics ==
Scores and results list Guinea's goal tally first, score column indicates score after each Bah goal.

List of international goals scored by Mamadou Bah
No.	Date	Venue	Opponent	Score	Result	Competition
1	12 October 2008	Stade du 28 Septembre, Conakry, Guinea	Kenya	2–0	3–2	2010 FIFA World Cup qualification
2	11 October 2009	Ohene Djan Stadium, Accra, Ghana	Burkina Faso	1–2	1–2	2010 FIFA World Cup qualification
3	27 March 2011	Mahamasina Municipal Stadium, Antananarivo, Madagascar	Madagascar	1–1	1–1	2012 Africa Cup of Nations qualification
4	28 January 2012	Stade de Franceville, Franceville, Gabon	Botswana	5–1	6–1	2012 Africa Cup of Nations
