= Majawa =

Majawa is a surname. Notable people with the surname include:

- Lawrence Majawa (born 1980), Malawian football defensive midfielder
- Zinenani Majawa, Malawian sex worker and activist
