= FUB Team of the Year =

Award for Botswana football teams

- Presented by: FUB
- First award: 2016

The FUB Team of the Year is an annual football award given by FUB. This award started in 2016 and allows the players of all premier league teams to choose their own eleven players and a coach based on their overall performances in the domestic football season.

== Selection process ==
Every Botswana Premier League player is eligible to vote and submits their own list of players who have performed well in African club competitions, domestic competitions and international tournaments for that particular season. The team is normally structured in a 4-3-3 formation with one goalkeeper, four defenders, three midfielders and three forwards. The voters can also elect a coach, a referee and an assistant referee.

After the votes are cast, they are tallied and the final team is announced at the FUB awards.

== Team of the Year 2002 ==
Player	Team(s)	Appearance
(Botswana) Mosimanegape Robert	(Botswana) Orapa United	1st
(Botswana) Tshepo Motlhabankwe	(Botswana) Township Rollers	1st
(Botswana) Simisani Mathumo	(Botswana) Township Rollers	1st
(Botswana) Olekantse Mambo	(Botswana) Orapa United	1st
(Botswana) Thabang Mosige	(Botswana) Orapa United	1st
(Botswana) Maano Ditshupo	(Botswana) Township Rollers	1st
(Malawi) Lawrence Majawa	(Botswana) Township Rollers	1st
(Botswana) Segolame Boy	(Botswana) Township Rollers	1st
(Botswana) Thabang Sesinyi	(Botswana) Orapa United	1st
(Zimbabwe) Ronald Chikomo	(Botswana) Orapa United	1st
(Zimbabwe) Tendai Nyumasi	(Botswana) Mochudi Centre Chiefs	1st

Coach: Şenol Güneş: Turkey

Players who played for two teams during the voting year have the club they transferred to during a transfer window listed second.

== Team of the Year 2017 ==
Player	Team(s)	Appearance
(Botswana) Anthony Gouws	(Botswana) Jwaneng Galaxy	1st
(Botswana) Tshepo Motlhabankwe	(Botswana) Township Rollers	2nd
(Botswana) Simisani Mathumo	(Botswana) Township Rollers	2nd
(Botswana) Mosha Gaolaolwe	(Botswana) Township Rollers	1st
(Botswana) Boitumelo Mafoko	(Botswana) Jwaneng Galaxy	1st
(Botswana) Maano Ditshupo	(Botswana) Township Rollers	2nd
(Malawi) Lawrence Majawa	(Botswana) Mochudi Centre Chiefs	2nd
(Zimbabwe) Tendai Nyumasi	(Botswana) Orapa United	2nd
(Botswana) Thabang Sesinyi	(Botswana) Jwaneng Galaxy	2nd
(Zimbabwe) Terrence Mandaza	(Botswana) Jwaneng Galaxy	1st
(Botswana) Thero Setsile	(Botswana) Jwaneng Galaxy	1st

Coach: (Zambia) Michael Sithole: (Botswana) Jwaneng Galaxy

Referee: (Botswana) Tirelo Mositwane

Assistant coach: (Botswana) Kitso Sibanda

Players who played for two teams during the voting year have the club they transferred to during a transfer window listed second.
