= Sub-Saharan African community of Paris =

African diaspora in Paris

The Paris metropolitan area has a community of origins from Sub-Saharan Africa. There were 54,000 persons of African nationalities, excluding Algeria, Morocco, and Tunisia, according to the 2009 French census. Countries of origin in sub-Saharan Africa include Burkina Faso, the Democratic Republic of the Congo, Guinea, Cameroon, Mali, and Senegal.

There was a significant increase in persons of sub-Saharan African origins residing in Paris from 1960 to 1992.

== Geography ==
As of circa 1995 the favored locations for sub-Saharan African settlement in the city of Paris included the 18th, 19th, and 20th arrondissements. In addition the following suburban municipalities had African settlement: Charenton, Issy-les-Moulineaux, Ivry-sur-Seine, Montreuil, and Pantin.

Montreuil's inhabitants often exaggeratedly nickname the town the "second Malian town after Bamako", or sometimes "Mali-sous-Bois" or "Bamako-sur-Seine" even though the Seine does not run through the town. Montreuil does indeed have a large Malian population : more than 2,000 inhabitants according to the INSEE in 1999, between 6,000 and 10,000 people according to the mairie, which estimates that Montreuil has the largest Malian community in France. 10% of the population is Malian or has Malian origins.

== Culture ==
The musical style coupé-décalé emphasizes the relationship between Abidjan, Ivory Coast and Paris.

Château Rouge, located in the 18th Arrondissement, is frequently referred to as "Little Africa" in Paris. This area serves as the heart of African culture within the city.

== Notable persons ==
- Luc Abalo
- Oumar Bakari
- Amedy Coulibaly
- Bira Dembélé
- Mana Dembélé
- Alou Diarra
- Boukary Dramé
- Erwan Kepoa Falé (Cergy)
- Tripy Makonda
- André Matsoua
- Dany N'Guessan
- Bakary Sako
- Mamadou Samassa (footballer born 1990)
- Oumar Sissoko
- Alassane També
- Bano Traoré
- Ibrahima Traoré
- Makan Traore (footballer born 1992)

== See also ==
- La Goutte d'Or - African immigrant neighbourhood of Paris
- Black French people
- Montreuil, Seine-Saint-Denis
