= Ntesang Simanyana =

Motswana footballer

Personal information
- Full name: Ntesang Simanyana
- Date of birth: 12 February 1990 (age 36)
- Place of birth: Molepolole
- Position: Attacking midfielder

Senior career*
Years	Team	Apps	(Gls)
2010-2011	Gaborone United		
2011-2013	Township Rollers		
2013-2014	Polokwane City		
2014-2016	Gaborone United		
2016-2019	Township Rollers		

International career^{‡}
2012-	Botswana	9	(1)
- * Club domestic league appearances and goals as of 29 August 2009 ‡ National team caps and goals as of 4 October 2019

Ntesang Simanyana (born 12 February 1990) is a Motswana footballer playing for the Botswana national football team.

== Honours ==
=== Club ===
Gaborone United

- Mascom Top 8 Cup:1

2014-15

Township Rollers

- Botswana Premier League:3

2016-17, 2017-18, 2018-19

- Mascom Top 8 Cup:2

2011-12, 2017-18

=== Individual ===
- Mascom Top 8 Cup Player of the Tournament: 2012
