= Abdoul Camara =

Guinean footballer (born 1990)

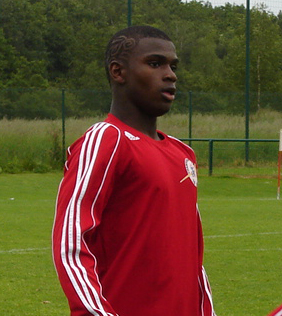
- Abdoul Camara

Personal information
- Full name: Abdoul Razzagui Camara
- Date of birth: 20 February 1990 (age 36)
- Place of birth: Mamou, Guinea
- Height: 1.77 m (5 ft 10 in)
- Positions: Striker; winger

Youth career
- 1999–2004: OS Fives
- 2004–2008: Rennes

Senior career*
Years	Team	Apps	(Gls)
2008–2011	Rennes	54	(0)
2009–2010	→ Vannes (loan)	37	(4)
2010–2011	Rennes B	8	(3)
2011–2014	Sochaux	47	(1)
2011–2014	Sochaux B	8	(3)
2013	→ PAOK (loan)	13	(2)
2014	→ Mallorca (loan)	6	(0)
2014–2016	Angers	44	(8)
2016–2017	Derby County	20	(1)
2017–2018	Guingamp	14	(2)
Total		251	(23)

International career
2006–2007	France U17	5	(0)
2007–2008	France U18	3	(0)
2011	France U21	1	(1)
2012–2018	Guinea	16	(4)
- * Club domestic league appearances and goals

Abdoul Razzagui Camara (born 20 February 1990) is a Guinean former professional footballer who as a striker, but was also often utilized as a left-winger.

== Early life ==
Camara was born in Mamou, Guinea, but he moved to France at a young age. He acquired French nationality by naturalization on 28 June 2002.

== Football career ==
=== Early career ===
In 1999, he joined local club OS Fives, located in the commune Fives, a suburb in the city of Lille. In June 2004, he joined the prestigious youth academy of Stade Rennais.

=== Rennes ===
While playing in the youth system, Camara was a part of a slew of talented youngsters. Among his teammates were Yann M'Vila, Yacine Brahimi, Samuel Souprayen, Maxime Le Marchand and Damien Le Tallec. The team effectively lived up to their reputation by winning the under-18 championship in the 2006–07 season and the Coupe Gambardella in 2008. On 15 August 2007, Camara, alongside M'Vila and Le Tallec, signed his first professional contract, agreeing to a three-year deal.

His play during the 2007–08 season was limited playing mainly with the club's Championnat de France amateur team and the under-18 squad. He was subsequently promoted to the senior team for the 2008–09 season. However, he wasn't assigned a number, and again, played on the club's CFA team. He appeared in 30 matches, scoring 4 goals and helping the side finish 1st among professional clubs in their group, thus qualifying for the playoffs, where they lost to Lyon in the semi-finals. He made his professional début for Rennes on the final matchday of the 2008–09 season appearing as a substitute in the club's 4–0 defeat to Marseille.

On 3 August 2009, Rennes agreed to send Camara on loan to Ligue 2 club Vannes OC for the entire season. He was given the first-team number 9 shirt and made his début in the club's opening league match against Metz, appearing as a substitute in a match that Vannes won 3–0. He played 37 league matches, scoring 4 goals.

Camara returned to Rennes for the 2010–11 season but only played intermittently, also playing 8 matches for the B team, scoring 3 goals.

=== Sochaux ===
Camara was sold to Sochaux-Montbéliard for £1.5m in the summer of 2011. He played 21 matches in his first season and another 15 in the first half of the 2012–13 season before being loaned out to Greek side PAOK in January 2013 for the rest of the season. He played 13 Super League matches, scoring twice. Camara spent the first half of the 2013–14 season at Sochaux-Montbéliard before being loaned out again, this time on 31 January 2014 to La Liga team Mallorca.

=== Angers ===
On 1 July 2014, after the expiry of his contract with Sochaux, Camara signed a three-year contract with Angers SCO. Camara played 27 league matches in his first season, scoring 6 goals. In the 2015–16 season, he impressed in manager Stephane Moulin's 4–3–3 formation, scoring twice in 17 matches and helping Angers to third in the table at the time of his departure from the club.

=== Derby County ===
On 4 January 2016, Camara joined Championship side Derby County on a three-and-a-half-year deal for an undisclosed fee, believed to be £1.25 million. Camara made his debut for Derby on 9 January against Hartlepool United in the FA Cup. He scored his first goal for the club in an FA Cup tie against Leicester City on 8 February 2017.

=== Retirement ===
He retired on health grounds in September 2018.

== International career ==
He played for the under-17, under-18 and under-21 teams. He was a part of the under-17 squad that reached the quarter-finals of the 2007 FIFA U-17 World Cup.

On 24 January 2012 Camara made his senior international début for the Guinea national team at the 2012 African Cup of Nations, coming on as a substitute for Alhassane Bangoura in a 1–0 loss against Mali. He scored twice in three matches during the group stage of the 2012 Africa Cup of Nations: the third in a 6–1 win over Botswana on 28 January and the equaliser in a 1–1 draw with Ghana on 1 February. He played with the national team in 2015 Africa Cup of Nations, where the team reached the quarter-finals.

== Style of play ==
Camara usually plays as a striker, but can also play as a left-winger. He describes himself as "a quick player. I like dribbling and to make a difference to the team but I also like to defend." In the 2015–16 season he was recognised as the quickest player in French football.

== Career statistics ==
Appearances and goals by club, season and competition
Club	Season	League			Cup		League Cup		Other		Total	
Club	Season	Division	Apps	Goals	Apps	Goals	Apps	Goals	Apps	Goals	Apps	Goals
Rennes	2008–09	Ligue 1	28	0	0	0	0	0	0	0	28	0
Rennes	2010–11	Ligue 1	24	0	2	1	1	0	0	0	27	1
Rennes	2011–12	Ligue 1	2	0	0	0	0	0	2	0	4	0
Rennes	Total		54	0	2	1	1	0	2	0	59	1
Vannes (loan)	2009–10	Ligue 2	37	4	2	1	2	1	0	0	41	6
Rennes B	2010–11	CFA	8	3	0	0	0	0	0	0	8	3
Sochaux	2011–12	Ligue 1	21	1	0	0	1	1	0	0	22	2
Sochaux	2012–13	Ligue 1	15	0	2	0	2	0	0	0	19	0
Sochaux	2013–14	Ligue 1	11	0	1	2	0	0	0	0	12	2
Sochaux	Total		47	1	3	2	3	1	0	0	52	4
Sochaux B	2011–12	CFA	6	2	0	0	0	0	0	0	6	2
Sochaux B	2013–14	CFA	2	1	0	0	0	0	0	0	2	1
Sochaux B	Total		8	3	0	0	0	0	0	0	8	3
PAOK (loan)	2012–13	Super League Greece	13	2	3	0	0	0	0	0	16	2
Mallorca (loan)	2013–14	Segunda División	6	0	0	0	0	0	0	0	6	0
Angers	2014–15	Ligue 2	27	6	1	0	2	0	0	0	30	6
Angers	2015–16	Ligue 1	17	2	0	0	0	0	0	0	17	2
Angers	Total		44	8	1	0	2	0	0	0	47	8
Derby County	2015–16	Championship	5	0	2	0	0	0	0	0	7	0
Derby County	2016–17	Championship	15	0	3	1	1	0	0	0	19	1
Derby County	Total		20	0	5	1	1	0	0	0	26	1
Guingamp	2017–18	Ligue 1	14	2	0	0	1	0	0	0	15	2
Career total			251	23	16	5	9	2	2	0	278	30

== Honours ==
Rennes

- Coupe Gambardella: 2008
