= Kabelo Dambe =

Motswana footballer (born 1990)

Personal information
- Full name: Kabelo Dambe
- Date of birth: 10 May 1990 (age 36)
- Place of birth: Francistown, Botswana
- Height: 1.74 m (5 ft 9 in)
- Position: Goalkeeper

Team information
- Current team: Township Rollers
- Number: 1

Youth career
- 2003–2006: Township Rollers U19

Senior career*
Years	Team	Apps	(Gls)
2006–2012	Township Rollers		(0)
2012–2015	Platinum Stars	29	(0)
2015–2018	Township Rollers		
2018–2019	Bloemfontein Celtic	0	(0)
2019–	Township Rollers	1	(0)

International career^{‡}
2012–	Botswana	44	(0)
- * Club domestic league appearances and goals as of 20 March 2018 ‡ National team caps and goals as of 8 June 2017

Kabelo Dambe (born 10 May 1990) is a Motswana footballer who currently plays for Township Rollers and the Botswana national football team as a goalkeeper.

== Honours ==
=== Clubs ===
Township Rollers

- Botswana Premier League:4

2009-10, 2010-11, 2015-16, 2016-17

- FA Cup:1

2009-10

- Mascom Top 8 Cup:1

2011-12

=== Individual ===
- Coca-Cola Cup Goalkeeper of the Tournament: 2010
- Botswana Premier League Player of the Season: 2010
- Botswana Premier League Players' Player of the Season: 2010
- Mascom Top 8 Cup Goalkeeper of the Tournament: 2012
- Botswana Premier League Goalkeeper of the Season: 2016
