= Onalethata Thekiso =

Motswana footballer

Personal information
- Full name: Onalethata Thekiso
- Date of birth: 14 May 1981 (age 45)
- Place of birth: Makwate, Botswana
- Position: Striker

Senior career*
Years	Team	Apps	(Gls)
2005–2013	Township Rollers		
2013–2016	Mochudi Centre Chiefs		

International career^{‡}
2006–2016	Botswana	24	(1)
- * Club domestic league appearances and goals ‡ National team caps and goals as of 11:50, 21 December 2009 (UTC)

Onalethata Thekiso (born 14 May 1981) is a Motswana former footballer. He retired in 2016 after playing for Township Rollers and Mochudi Centre Chiefs in the Botswana Premier League. He has won twenty-four caps for the Botswana national football team.

== Honours ==
=== Club ===
Township Rollers

- Botswana Premier League:1

2009-10

- FA Cup:1

2010

- Mascom Top 8 Cup:1

2011-12

Mochudi Centre Chiefs

- Botswana Premier League:1

2014-15
