= Oumar Bakari =

French footballer (born 1980)

Personal information
- Full name: Oumar Bakari
- Date of birth: 30 April 1980 (age 46)
- Place of birth: Montreuil-sous-Bois, France
- Height: 1.96 m (6 ft 5 in)
- Position: Defender

Team information
- Current team: UJA Alfortville

Senior career*
Years	Team	Apps	(Gls)
1997–1998	Le Mans	0	(0)
1998	Eendracht Aalst	?	(?)
1999–2003	ES Wasquehal	56	(7)
2003–2004	Nice	7	(0)
2004–2005	Laval	7	(0)
2005–2006	Caen	8	(0)
2006–2008	Charleroi	0	(0)
2008–2009	Gueugnon	4	(1)
2009–2010	UJA Alfortville	3	(0)
2010–2011	Sénart-Moissy	5	(0)
- * Club domestic league appearances and goals

Oumar Bakari (born 30 April 1980) is a French retired footballer.

He signed for Charleroi following his contract expiration with Stade Malherbe Caen in November 2006, becoming the sixth player of African descent to sign for the Belgian side.

Bakari previously played for OGC Nice in Ligue 1 as well as ES Wasquehal, Stade Lavallois and Stade Malherbe Caen in Ligue 2. (Note: Oumar Bakari – French league stats at LFP – also available in French (archived))

== See also ==
- Sub-Saharan African community of Paris
