= Lawrence Majawa =

Malawian Football Player

Personal information
- Full name: Lawrence Tico Majawa
- Date of birth: 13 March 1980 (age 46)
- Place of birth: Blantyre
- Height: 1.76 m (5 ft 9 1/2 in)
- Position: Defensive midfielder

Team information
- Current team: Mighty Wanderers

Senior career*
Years	Team	Apps	(Gls)
2000–2008	Mighty Wanderers		
2008-2017	Township Rollers		
2017-2019	Mochudi Centre Chiefs		
2019-	Mighty Wanderers		

International career^{‡}
2010-	Malawi	4	(0)
- * Club domestic league appearances and goals as of 29 August 2009 ‡ National team caps and goals as of 4 October 2019

Lawrence Tico Majawa (born 13 March 1980) is a Malawian footballer playing for Mighty Wanderers in the Malawi Premier Division and the Malawi national football team.

== Career ==
Majawa began his professional football career in his native Malawi with Mighty Wanderers. Spending eight years with the Blantyre club, he would carve his name into the club history books by leading them to the FISD Challenge Cup (Malawi's FA Cup) and then the Premier Division title in back to back seasons. In 2008 he jumped ship to the Botswana Premier League with Township Rollers and became an instant success, winning seven trophies in nine years with the club before leaving the club after refusing to take a pay cut. Majawa then spent two seasons at fierce rivals Mochudi Centre Chiefs before returning to Mighty Wanderers in 2019.

== Honours ==
=== Club ===
Mighty Wanderers

- Malawi Premier Division:1

2006

- FISD Challenge Cup:1

2005

Township Rollers

- Botswana Premier League:5

2009-10, 2010-11, 2013-14, 2015-16, 2016-17

- FA Cup:1

2010

- Mascom Top 8 Cup:1

2011-12

=== Individual ===
- Botswana Premier League Player of the Month: November 2015
- FUB Team of the Year: 2016
