= Ibrahima Traoré =

Guinean footballer (born 1988)

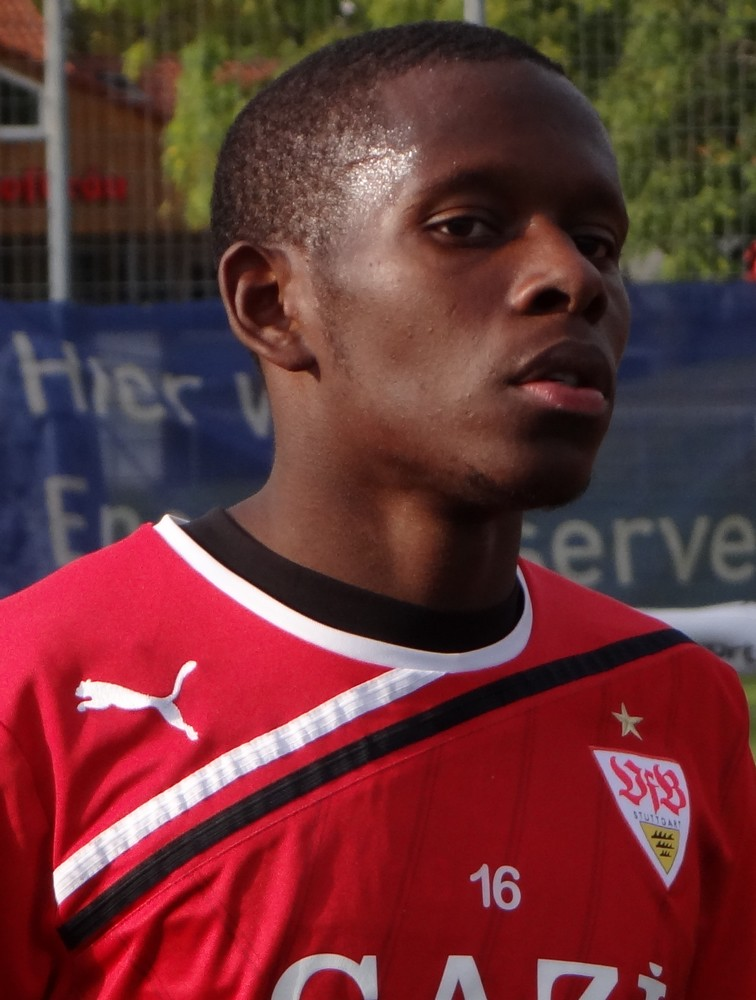
- Traoré with VfB Stuttgart in 2011

Personal information
- Full name: Ibrahima Traoré
- Date of birth: 21 April 1988 (age 38)
- Place of birth: Villepinte, France
- Height: 1.72 m (5 ft 8 in)
- Position: Left winger

Youth career
- 2001–2004: Charenton
- 2004–2005: Levallois

Senior career*
Years	Team	Apps	(Gls)
2005–2006	Levallois	4	(0)
2006–2009	Hertha BSC II	62	(12)
2007–2009	Hertha BSC	1	(0)
2009–2011	FC Augsburg	45	(8)
2011–2014	VfB Stuttgart	75	(6)
2014–2021	Borussia Mönchengladbach	99	(6)
Total		286	(32)

International career
2010–2019	Guinea	49	(8)
- * Club domestic league appearances and goals

Ibrahima Traoré (born 21 April 1988) is a former professional footballer who played as a left winger. Born in France, he played for the Guinea national team.

Coming through the youth system, Traoré began his senior career with French amateur club Levallois in 2005. He moved to Germany one year later, playing for Hertha BSC's reserve team Hertha BSC II. Following a season at FC Augsburg in 2009–10, Traoré joined VfB Stuttgart. He later moved to Borussia Mönchengladbach in 2014, where he played until the end of his career in 2021.

Born in France, Traoré was eligible to represent Guinea internationally through his father. He made his debut in 2010, and played for Guinea in three Africa Cup of Nations tournaments (2012, 2015 and 2019).

== Early life ==
Traoré was born in Villepinte, France, to a Guinean father and a Lebanese mother. He grew up in Guinea before returning to Paris at the age of 4. He grew up on the same street as Gabriel Obertan.

== Club career ==
=== Early career ===
Traoré played youth football with Charenton and Levallois. He made his senior debut with Levallois in the Championnat de France Amateurs 2, before being transferred to German club Hertha BSC on 1 January 2007, making his Bundesliga debut for them on 9 December 2007, against 1. FC Nürnberg.

=== FC Augsburg ===
On 5 March 2009, Traoré began a trial with FC Augsburg, signing a two-year contract with them on 14 July.

=== VfB Stuttgart ===
In May 2011, it was announced that Traoré would move to VfB Stuttgart at the end of the 2010–11 season.

In December 2013, Traoré stated that he had turned down offers from a number of English clubs over the summer.

=== Borussia Mönchengladbach ===
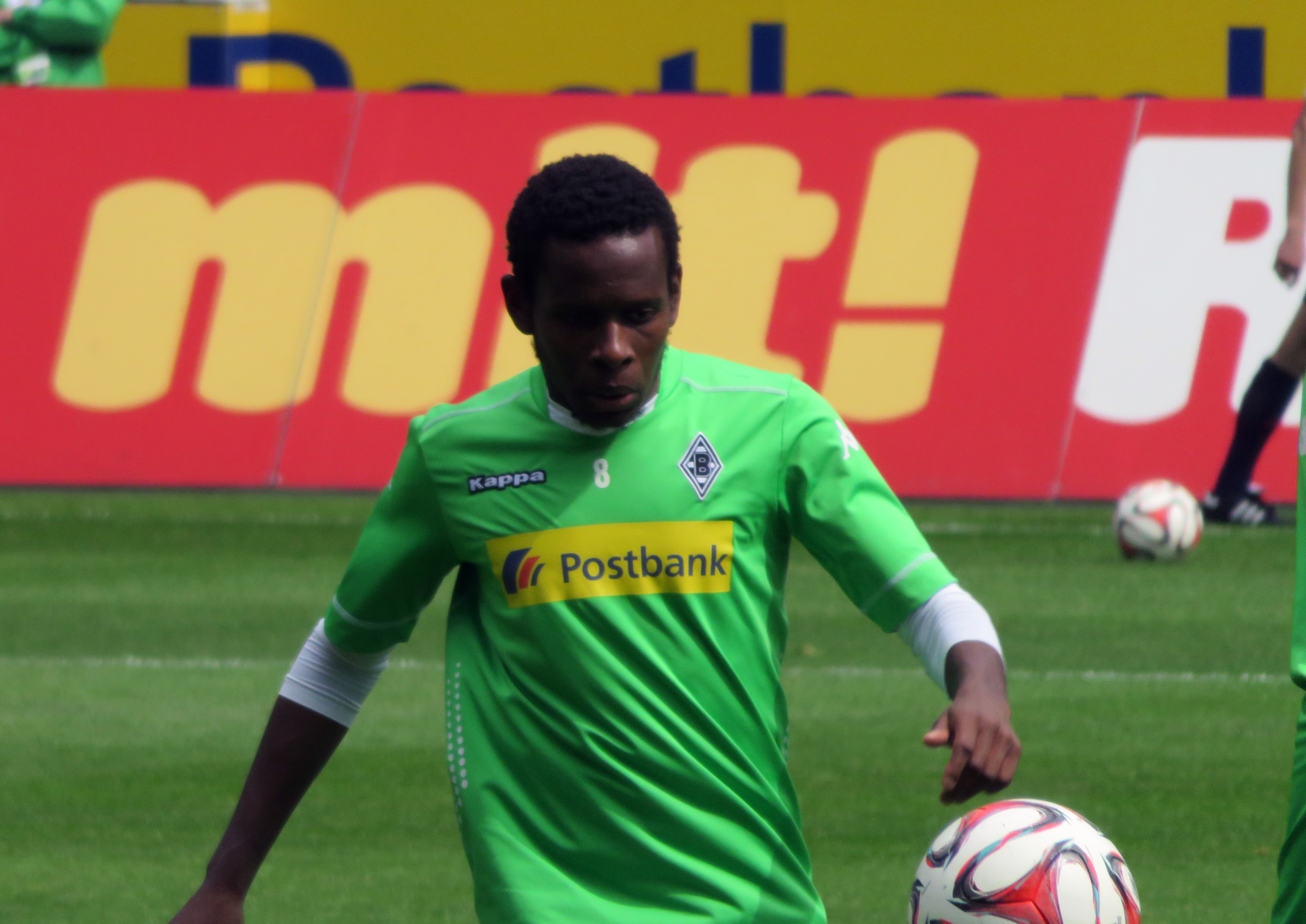
Traoré training with Borussia Mönchengladbach in 2014

In April 2014, it was announced that Traoré would sign for Borussia Mönchengladbach at the start of the 2014–15 season.

On 8 August 2015, he marked his season debut by scoring in a 4–1 win at FC St. Pauli in the first round of the DFB-Pokal.

In May 2017, he signed a new contract with Borussia Mönchengladbach, lasting until 2021. He made his 100th competitive appearance for the club in October the following year, after coming on as a substitute in a 4–0 win over Mainz 05.

In May 2021, after a seven-year stay with the club, he left Mönchengladbach when his contract expired. He earned over 130 appearances for the club across all competitions.

== International career ==
Traoré made his international debut for Guinea on 11 August 2010, against Mali. Guinea won the match 2–0, with Traoré scoring Guinea's second goal. In the 2012 Africa Cup of Nations qualification on 8 October 2011, Traoré scored in the last game of group B against Nigeria a last-second equalizer in the 90+12-minute, meaning Guinea's qualification for the 2012 Africa Cup of Nations. In November 2014, concerns were raised about Traoré playing for Guinea due to the ongoing Ebola outbreak in West Africa.

He was selected to Guinea's squad for the 2015 African Cup of Nations and scored the team's equaliser in a 1–1 draw with Cameroon at the group stage. After the tournament, he took a break from international football, returning in March 2016.

== Career statistics ==
=== International ===
Appearances and goals by national team and year
National team	Year	Apps	Goals
Guinea	2010	4	0
Guinea	2011	5	1
Guinea	2012	9	2
Guinea	2013	4	1
Guinea	2014	7	3
Guinea	2015	4	1
Guinea	2016	6	0
Guinea	2017	1	0
Guinea	2018	2	0
Guinea	2019	7	0
Total		49	8

Scores and results list Guinea's goal tally first, score column indicates score after each Traoré goal.

List of international goals scored by Ibrahima Traoré
No.	Date	Venue	Opponent	Score	Result	Competition	Ref.
1	8 October 2011	National Stadium, Abuja, Nigeria	Nigeria	2–2	2–2	2012 Africa Cup of Nations qualification	
2	28 January 2012	Stade de Franceville, Franceville, Gabon	Botswana	4–1	6–1	2012 Africa Cup of Nations	
3	3 June 2012	National Sports Stadium, Harare, Zimbabwe	Zimbabwe	1–0	1–0	2014 FIFA World Cup qualification	
4	9 June 2013	Stade du 28 Septembre, Conakry, Guinea	Mozambique	4–1	6–1	2014 FIFA World Cup qualification	
5	5 March 2014	Azadi Stadium, Tehran, Iran	Iran	2–0	2–1	Friendly	
6	11 October 2014	Stade Mohamed V, Casablanca, Morocco	Ghana	1–1	1–1	2015 Africa Cup of Nations qualification	
7	19 November 2014	Stade Mohamed V, Casablanca, Morocco	Uganda	1–0	2–0	2015 Africa Cup of Nations qualification	
8	24 January 2015	Estadio de Malabo, Malabo, Equatorial Guinea	Cameroon	1–0	1–1	2015 Africa Cup of Nations	
