= Mmusa Ohilwe =

Motswana footballer (born 1986)

Personal information
- Date of birth: 17 April 1986 (age 40)
- Place of birth: Shoshong, Botswana
- Height: 1.86 m (6 ft 1 in)
- Positions: Centre-back; right-back

Team information
- Current team: Extension Gunners

Senior career*
Years	Team	Apps	(Gls)
2005–2007	Botswana Meat Commission	52	(3)
2007–2009	Township Rollers	57	(5)
2009–2010	Botswana Meat Commission	27	(2)
2010–2012	Gaborone United	53	(4)
2012–2013	Botswana Meat Commission	22	(0)
2014–	Extension Gunners	14	(1)

International career^{‡}
2009–	Botswana	29	(1)
- * Club domestic league appearances and goals ‡ National team caps and goals as of 26 December 2014

Mmusa Ohilwe (born 17 April 1986) is a Motswana footballer who currently plays for Extension Gunners and the Botswana national football team.

== Club career ==
Mmusa started his career in the Botswana Premier League at Botswana Meat Commission (BMC FC) in 2005 and later switched to Township Rollers in 2007 where he spent two seasons before returning to BMC where he started his career. With his defensive abilities highly regarded, Ohilwe went on trial to Greece before returning home to join Gaborone United Gaborone United, then BMC again, before switching to Extension Gunners in January 2014 after returning from Vietnam where he had a successful trial but could not make a move due to administrative issues.

== International career ==
He has featured in the national team twenty nine times to date and was a member of the team that made history by being the first team to qualify for the African Nations Cup for the first time in 2012.

=== International goals ===
Scores and results list Botswana's goal tally first.

#	Date	Venue	Opponent	Score	Result	Competition
1	13 October 2012	Lobatse Stadium, Lobatse, Botswana	Mali	1–4	1–4	2013 Africa Cup of Nations Qualification
