= Dipsy Selolwane =

Motswana footballer

Personal information
- Full name: Diphetogo Selolwane
- Date of birth: 27 January 1978 (age 48)
- Place of birth: Gaborone, Botswana
- Height: 1.75 m (5 ft 9 in)
- Positions: Midfielder; striker

Team information
- Current team: Pretoria University
- Number: 8

Youth career
- 2000: Harris–Stowe State University
- 2001: Saint Louis University

Senior career*
Years	Team	Apps	(Gls)
1997–2000	Gaborone United		
2001–2002	Vejle BK	5	(0)
2002–2005	Chicago Fire	27	(3)
2005	Real Salt Lake	8	(0)
2005–2007	Santos	45	(13)
2007	Jomo Cosmos	2	(0)
2008–2010	Ajax Cape Town	61	(8)
2010–2012	Supersport United	39	(2)
2012–2015	University of Pretoria		

International career^{‡}
1998–2012	Botswana	68	(18)
- * Club domestic league appearances and goals as of May 25, 2011 ‡ National team caps and goals as of January 28, 2016

Diphetogo "Dipsy" Selolwane (born 27 January 1978) is a Botswana former professional footballer who played as a midfielder. He has also played as a striker in Major League Soccer.

== Club career ==
Selolwane first played for Gaborone United in the Botswana Premier League. After playing college soccer at Saint Louis University and being named first-team All-American in 2001, Selolwane was drafted 36th overall in the 2002 MLS Superdraft by the Chicago Fire. Selolwane was traded to Real Salt Lake after the 2004 MLS season but failed to make an impact and was released during the 2005 season. In four years of action in MLS, he scored three goals.

He returned to Africa, first to Botswana and then to the South African Premier Soccer League. His first PSL club was Santos, before moving to Jomo Cosmos, after having a very disappointing 2006–07 season. He signed with Ezenkosi for the 2007–08 season, but made only two appearances and joined Ajax Cape Town in early 2008. His PSL career flourished at Ajax, where he was converted to a midfielder and earned a July 2010 move to league champions Supersport United.

== International career ==
Selolwane was also a significant player for the Botswana national football team. On 28 January 2012, during the 2012 Africa Cup of Nations group stage, Selolwane converted a penalty, which temporarily equalised the score in the eventual 1–6 loss against Guinea. This was the first ever goal scored by the national team in a major international tournament, and his 18th and last international goal for Botswana. Four days later, on 1 February 2012, he played Botswana’s third group stage game against Mali, earning his 68th and last cap with his country.

== Personal life ==
Selolwane and actor Marang Molosiwa announced that they were having a child in June 2019. This is Selolwane's second child. Selolwane and Marang tied the knot in 2021.

== International goals ==
Scores and results list Botswana's goal tally first.

#	Date	Venue	Opponent	Score	Result	Competition
1.	20 February 1999	National Stadium, Gaborone, Botswana	South Africa	1–0	1–2	1999 COSAFA Cup
2.	19 March 2000	National Stadium, Gaborone, Botswana	Swaziland	1–0	3–0	Friendly
3.	19 March 2000	National Stadium, Gaborone, Botswana	Swaziland	2–0	3–0	Friendly
4.	4 June 2000	Somhlolo National Stadium, Lobamba, Swaziland	Lesotho	1–0	1–1	Kings Millenium Cup
5.	7 July 2000	National Stadium, Gaborone, Botswana	Madagascar	1–0	1–0	2002 Africa Cup of Nations Qualification
6.	14 December 2002	National Stadium, Gaborone, Botswana	Zambia	1–0	1–0	Friendly
7.	22 June 2003	Somhlolo National Stadium, Lobamba, Swaziland	Swaziland	2–3	2–3	2004 Africa Cup of Nations Qualification
8.	11 October 2003	National Stadium, Gaborone, Botswana	Lesotho	3–0	4–1	2006 FIFA World Cup qualification
9.	11 October 2003	National Stadium, Gaborone, Botswana	Lesotho	4–0	4–1	2006 FIFA World Cup qualification
10.	5 June 2004	Stade Olympique de Radès, Radès, Tunisia	Tunisia	1–2	1–4	2006 FIFA World Cup qualification
11.	19 June 2004	National Stadium, Gaborone, Botswana	Malawi	1–0	2–0	2006 FIFA World Cup qualification
12.	9 October 2004	National Stadium, Gaborone, Botswana	Kenya	2–1	2–1	2006 FIFA World Cup qualification
13.	18 June 2005	Kamuzu Stadium, Blantyre, Malawi	Malawi	2–0	3–1	2006 FIFA World Cup qualification
14.	16 June 2007	National Stadium, Gaborone, Botswana	Mauritania	2–0	2–1	2008 Africa Cup of Nations Qualification
15.	8 June 2008	Estádio da Machava, Maputo, Mozambique	Mozambique	1–0	2–1	2010 FIFA World Cup qualification
16.	14 June 2008	National Stadium, Gaborone, Botswana	Ivory Coast	1–0	1–1	2010 FIFA World Cup qualification
17.	30 August 2008	National Stadium, Gaborone, Botswana	Lesotho	1–0	1–0	Friendly
18.	28 January 2012	Stade de Franceville, Franceville, Gabon	Guinea	1–1	1–6	2012 Africa Cup of Nations

== See also ==
- Aaron Mokoena
- Botswana National Football team

== Quotes ==
- "I played for my country with pride and i earned my stripes as a Zebra."
- "I want to share my football knowledge with others and help players live their dreams in football as well as give back to the community. We also teach them life skills because there is life after football."
- "I want it to be a world standard academy and produce professional footballers." https://thevoicebw.com/dipping-in-with-dipsy/ by Portia Mlilo (22 May, 2020)
- "Education and talent can take you places. I have been to America because of my football talent."
- "I grew up in a family of football. My mother was my mentor, and she used to buy me soccer boots and footballs. I urge parents to also support their children and become actively involves in their lives." https://www.sundaystandard.info/soccer-legend-dipsy-inspires-old-naledi-children/ 23 November, 2015
