= Phenyo Mongala =

Motswana footballer

Personal information
- Full name: Phenyo David Mongala
- Date of birth: June 10, 1985 (age 41)
- Place of birth: Kanye, Botswana
- Height: 1.67 m (5 ft 5 1/2 in)
- Position: Winger

Team information
- Current team: CS Don Bosco

Senior career*
| Years | Team | Apps | (Gls) |
| –2002 | Southern Pirates | ? | (?) |
| 2002–2006 | Township Rollers | ? | (?) |
| 2006–2007 | Silver Stars | ? | (?) |
| 2006–2007 | → University of Pretoria (loan) | ? | (?) |
| 2007–2009 | University of Pretoria | ? | (?) |
| 2009–2012 | Orlando Pirates | 22 | (2) |
| 2011–2012 | → Bloemfontein Celtic (loan) | 20 | (2) |
| 2012–2013 | Mochudi Centre Chiefs | | |
| 2013– | CS Don Bosco | | |

International career
| 2009– | Botswana | 19 | (1) |
- * Club domestic league appearances and goals

Phenyo Mongala (born June 10, 1985) is a Motswana footballer who currently plays for CS Don Bosco in the DR Congolese Linafoot.

== International career ==
He is a member for the Botswana national football team.

== Personal life ==
Mongala is also known as Mzambiya.
