= Mosimanegape Ramoshibidu =

Motswana footballer

Personal information
- Full name: Mosimanegape Ramoshibidu
- Date of birth: 15 June 1985 (age 41)
- Place of birth: Lobatse, Botswana
- Height: 1.70 m (5 ft 7 in)
- Position: Left back

Team information
- Current team: Botswana Meat Commission

Senior career*
Years	Team	Apps	(Gls)
2007–	Botswana Meat Commission		

International career^{‡}
2008–	Botswana	28	(0)
- * Club domestic league appearances and goals ‡ National team caps and goals as of 10:44, 21 December 2009 (UTC)

Mosimanegape Ramoshibidu is a Motswana footballer who currently plays for Botswana Meat Commission as a defender. He has won seven caps for the Botswana national football team.
