= Patrick Motsepe =

Motswana footballer

Patrick Motsepe (born 2 March 1983) is a Motswana footballer who has played for the Botswana national football team.

Motsepe plays as a central midfielder for local club BDF XI.
