= Tshepo Motlhabankwe =

Motswana footballer

Personal information
- Full name: Tshepo Motlhabankwe
- Date of birth: 17 March 1980 (age 46)
- Place of birth: Digawana
- Date of death: April 5, 2026
- Height: 1.75 m (5 ft 9 in)
- Positions: Right wing-back; right-back

Team information
- Current team: Township Rollers
- Number: 8

Senior career*
Years	Team	Apps	(Gls)
2003–2005	Extension Gunners	58	(4)
2005–2006	Lobtrans Gunners	28	(2)
2006–2008	Centre Chiefs	72	(9)
2008–2012	Maritzburg United	135	(19)
2012–2013	Heracles Almelo	0	(0)
2013–2014	BMC Lobatse		
2015–	Centre Chiefs		

International career^{‡}
2003–2013	Botswana	75	(2)
- * Club domestic league appearances and goals as of 29 August 2009 ‡ National team caps and goals as of 2 February 2017

Tshepo Motlhabankwe (born 17 March 1980) is a former Motswana footballer who played for various Botswana Premier League teams such as Mochudi Centre Chiefs and Township Rollers as well as teams in the South African Premier Division. He is also a former Botswana international, having scored 2 goals between his debut in 2003 and retirement in 2013.

== Career ==
Motlhabankwe is originally from a small village of Digawana just a few kilometers from Lobatse. Despite being one of Botswana's most celebrated footballers, Motlhabankwe did not play youth football and instead played athletics and table tennis at school. In 1997 he switched to amateur football after his father convinced him to join his newly formed team, DACARA FC. After plying his trade in the amateur ranks for several years, Motlhabankwe would make his professional football debut with Division One side Kanye Southern Pirates.

It was during his stint with Southern Pirates that he impressed scouts of Botswana Premier League giants Extension Gunners, whom he joined in 2000 and shortly afterwards he received a call-up to the Botswana national team. Motlhabankwe made his debut for the national team in a 4–1 win against Lesotho. He then cemented a regular position in the national team. Motlhabankwe would switch to fellow Premier League side Mochudi Centre Chiefs in 2007 and found immediate success, winning three leagues and an FA Cup. He also featured in Stanley Tshosane's squad, commonly known as the "Botswana Dream Team", which qualified for and played in the 2012 Africa Cup of Nations. He parted ways with Chiefs in 2013 and joined Gilport Lions (then known as BMC), whom he left in 2015.

Upon the end of his contract with Gilport Lions, Motlhabankwe chose not to renew and instead joined Township Rollers as a free agent. With Rollers, he would win four consecutive league titles and a Mascom Top 8 Cup. He was also part of the history-making squad which qualified for the CAF Champions League group stages in 2018. Towards the end of the 2018-19 Premier League season Motlhabankwe announced his retirement to focus on other ventures.

== Honours ==
=== Club ===
Mochudi Centre Chiefs

- Botswana Premier League:3

2007-08, 2011-12, 2012-13

- FA Cup:1

2007-08

Township Rollers

- Botswana Premier League:4

2015-16, 2016-17, 2017-18, 2018-19

- Mascom Top 8 Cup: 1

2017-18

=== Individual ===
- FUB Team of the Year: 2017
