= Mogakolodi Ngele =

Motswana footballer (born 1990)

Personal information
- Full name: Mogakolodi Tsotso Ngele
- Date of birth: 6 October 1990 (age 36)
- Place of birth: Gaborone, Botswana
- Height: 1.78 m (5 ft 10 in)
- Position: Attacking midfielder

Team information
- Current team: Township Rollers F.C
- Number: 11

Senior career*
Years	Team	Apps	(Gls)
2007–2011	Uniao Flamengo Santos		
2011–2012	Township Rollers		
2012–2015	Platinum Stars	67	(19)
2015–2019	Mamelodi Sundowns	11	(1)
2016–2017	→ Bidvest Wits (loan)	18	(3)
2018	→ Supersport United (loan)	8	(1)
2019–2020	Black Leopards	1	(0)
2020–21	Tshakhuma Tsha Madzivhandila	13	(3)
2021-22	Chippa United	15	(1)
2022-	Township Rollers	0	(0)

International career^{‡}
2009–	Botswana	49	(5)
- * Club domestic league appearances and goals as of 21/6/25 @ 18:50(AEST) ‡ National team caps and goals as of 21 November 2023

Mogakolodi Ngele (born 6 October 1990) is a Motswana footballer who currently plays for Botswana Premier League club Township Rollers and the Botswana national football team as a midfielder. He joined Bidvest Wits from Mamelodi Sundowns. He was a participant at the 2012 Africa Cup of Nations. In 2014, he signed a 5-year contract with Mamelodi Sundowns F.C. however, he will stay with his current club until the end of the 2014–15 season. Bidvest Wits then signed him on loan again until the end of the 2016–17 season when Bidvest Wits and Ngele won the Absa Premiership title, beating the likes of Cape Town, Mamelodi Sundowns and Kaizer Chiefs.

After returning from his loan spell at Bidvest Wit, in his 2017–18 season he struggled to get playing time, only playing one game in the whole season, with Mamelodi Sundowns coach Pitso Mosimane saying "He needs to prove himself to get into the starting eleven".

On 26 January 2018 he was signed on loan for 6 months by Absa Premiership team Supersport United.

== International ==
=== International goals ===
Scores and results list Botswana's goal tally first.

No	Date	Venue	Opponent	Score	Result	Competition
1.	1 February 2012	Stade d'Angondjé, Libreville, Gabon	Mali	1–0	1–2	2012 Africa Cup of Nations
2.	15 June 2013	Lobatse Stadium, Lobatse, Botswana	Central African Republic	2–2	3–2	2014 FIFA World Cup qualification
3.	13 October 2015	Francistown Sports Complex, Francistown, Botswana	Eritrea	1–1	4–0	2018 FIFA World Cup qualification
4.	13 October 2015	Francistown Sports Complex, Francistown, Botswana	Eritrea	3–1	4–0	2018 FIFA World Cup qualification
5.	16 November 2023	Obed Itani Chilume Stadium, Francistown, Botswana	Mozambique	2–3	2–3	2026 FIFA World Cup qualification

== Honours ==
=== Individual ===
- Mascom Top 8 Cup Top Goalscorer: 2012
- Telkom knockout winner with Platinum Stars: 2013
- MTN 8 winner with Platinum stars: 2013

=== Team ===
- Absa Premiership title 2016/17
