= Michel Dussuyer =

French football player and manager (born 1959)

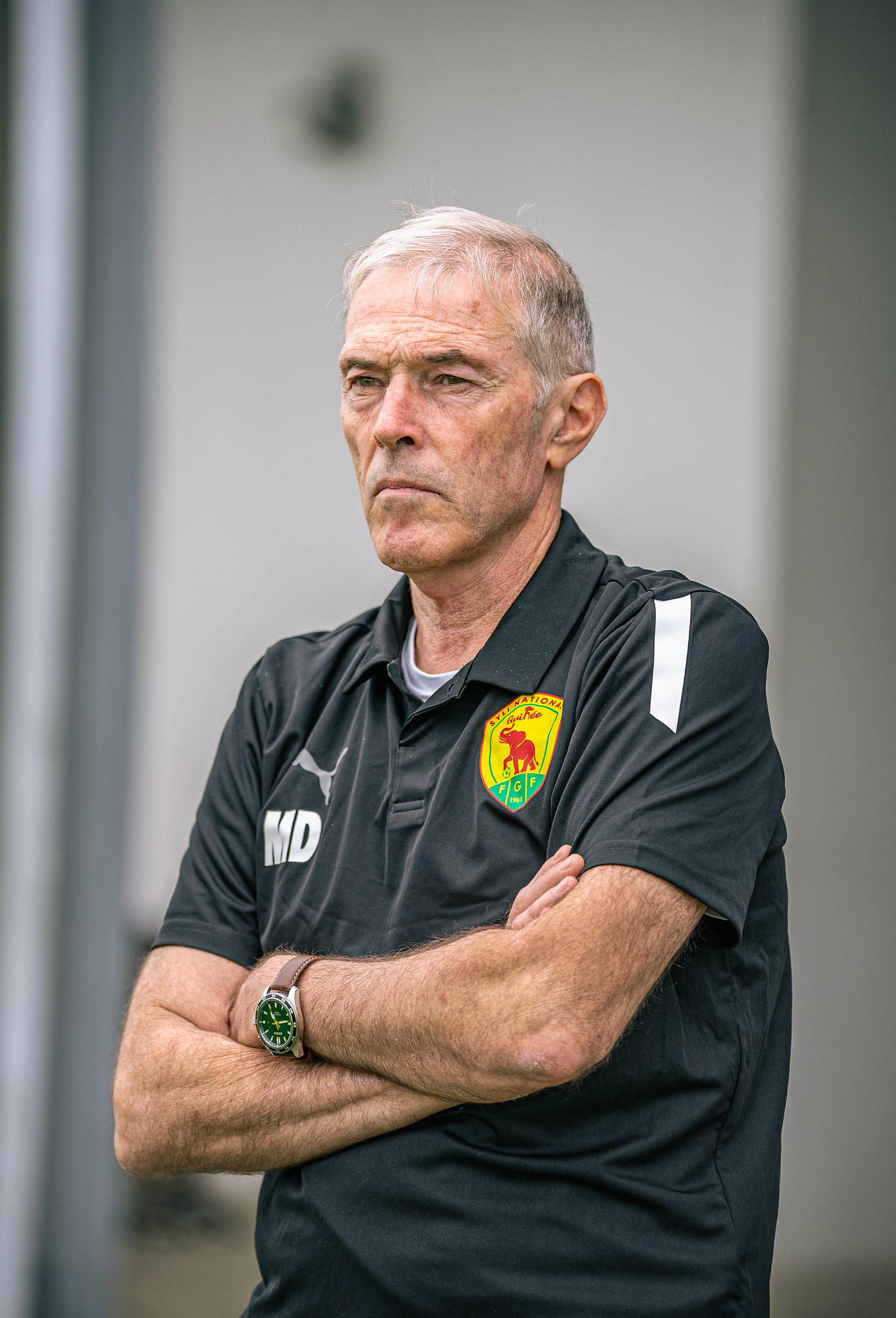
- Dussuyer as Guinea manager

Personal information
- Date of birth: 28 May 1959 (age 67)
- Place of birth: Cannes, France
- Position: Goalkeeper

Senior career*
Years	Team	Apps	(Gls)
1978–1981	Cannes	66	(0)
1981–1983	Nice	17	(0)
1983–1984	Alès	34	(0)
1984–1986	Cannes	31	(0)
1986	Montceau	1	(0)
1986–1996	Cannes	128	(0)
Total		277	(0)

Managerial career
- 2002–2004: Guinea
- 2006–2007: Cannes
- 2008–2010: Benin
- 2010–2013: Guinea
- 2014–2015: Guinea
- 2015–2017: Ivory Coast
- 2018–2021: Benin
- 2024–2025: Guinea
- * Club domestic league appearances and goals

Michel Dussuyer (born 28 May 1959) is a French football coach and former professional player.

== Playing career ==
Dussuyer played club football as a goalkeeper for Cannes, Nice and Alès.

== Coaching career ==
Dussuyer was an assistant coach at Cannes between 1996 and 2002.

He was appointed as manager of the Guinea national team in September 2002. He led them to the 2004 African Cup of Nations, their first appearance in the competition since 1998. The country reached the quarter-finals of the competition - their best result in 30 years - but he resigned in March 2004, citing family reasons.

In 2006, he was an assistant coach to Henri Michel for the Ivory Coast national team, for the 2006 Africa Cup of Nations. He returned to Cannes as manager, from 2006 to 2007.

He was appointed as manager of the Benin national team in June 2008. He was sacked in February 2010, along with the rest of the coaching staff. He claimed he was not informed of his sacking by the Benin Football Federation.

In May 2010 he returned as manager of Guinea. After leaving in late 2013, he was re-appointed in February 2014. After taking Guinea to the quarter-finals of the 2015 Africa Cup of Nations, he became manager of the Ivory Coast national team in July 2015.

Dussuyer resigned from his role as Ivory Coast manager after the team failed to reach the quarter-finals of the 2017 Africa Cup of Nations.

In December 2017 he was linked with the vacant Benin national team manager's job. He was appointed to the role in August 2018 and was in charge of Benin at the 2019 Africa Cup of Nations. He was sacked by Benin in June 2021. He again coached the Guinea national team from September 2024 until mid-2025.
