= Ibrahima Diallo (footballer, born 1985) =

Guinean footballer

Personal information
- Full name: Ibrahima Diallo
- Date of birth: 26 September 1985 (age 41)
- Place of birth: Conakry, Guinea
- Height: 1.80 m (5 ft 11 in)
- Position: Left back

Senior career*
Years	Team	Apps	(Gls)
2004–2005	Rouen	27	(0)
2005–2006	Guingamp B	23	(0)
2006–2010	R. Charleroi	51	(0)
2010–2011	KV Oostende	27	(1)
2011–2012	Waasland-Beveren	22	(0)
2012–2016	Angers	30	(0)
2013–2014	Angers B	12	(0)

International career^{‡}
2007–2013	Guinea	29	(0)
- * Club domestic league appearances and goals as of 19 May 2015 ‡ National team caps and goals as of 1 December 2009

Ibrahima Diallo (born 26 September 1985) is a footballer from Guinea who plays as a left back.

== Early career ==
Raised in France, Diallo began his football career playing for CSF Bretigny.

== Professional career ==
Diallo signed French Ligue 2 club EA Guingamp in 2005 and after signed for R. Charleroi S.C. In 2010, Diallo moved in K.V. Oostende before moving to Waasland-Beveren in 2011. On 27 June 2012, Diallo signed for French Ligue 2 side Angers on a two-year contract.

== International career ==
Diallo celebrated his first cap for Guinea national football team against Tunisia for a friendly game.
