= Boitumelo Mafoko =

Motswana footballer

Personal information
- Full name: Boitumelo Mafoko
- Date of birth: 11 February 1982 (age 44)
- Place of birth: Mahalapye, Botswana
- Height: 1.86 m (6 ft 1 in)
- Position: Defensive midfielder

Senior career*
Years	Team	Apps	(Gls)
2005–2009	Township Rollers		
2009–2012	Santos	26	(0)
2012–2014	Botswana Defence Force XI		
2014–2018	Jwaneng Galaxy		

International career
2006–2016	Botswana	54	(2)
- * Club domestic league appearances and goals

Boitumelo Mafoko (born 11 February 1982) is a Motswana former footballer who played in his native country as well as for Santos in the South African Premier Soccer League.
