= Mompati Thuma =

Motswana footballer

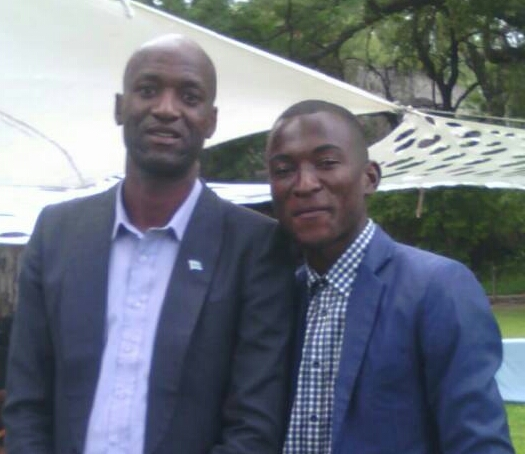

Personal information
- Full name: Mompati Thuma
- Date of birth: 5 April 1981 (age 45)
- Place of birth: Botswana
- Height: 1.82 m (5 ft 11 1/2 in)
- Positions: Centre-back; right-back

Team information
- Current team: Botswana Defence Force XI

Senior career*
Years	Team	Apps	(Gls)
2004–2007	Mogoditshane Fighters		
2007–2015	Botswana Defence Force XI		

International career^{‡}
2004–2013	Botswana	84	(1)
- * Club domestic league appearances and goals as of 29 August 2009 ‡ National team caps and goals as of 6 September 2013

Mompati Thuma (born 5 April 1981) is a Motswana former footballer. He currently plays for the Botswana Defence Force XI in the Botswana Premier League.

== Career ==
He earned 84 caps with the Botswana national team, having made his debut in 2004, making him the most capped player of the national team.

== Personal life ==
Mompati Thuma is from a family of three and the only son from his family. He works as a public officer and soldier. He used to play karate as his favourite sport, which he practiced since his primary school days.

== Statistics ==
=== International goals ===
#	Date	Venue	Opponent	Score	Result	Competition
1	27 October 2010	Lobatse Stadium, Lobatse, Botswana	Swaziland	2–0	Win	Friendly
Correct as of 13 January 2017
