= Thierno Bah (footballer, born 1982) =

Guinean footballer (born 1982)

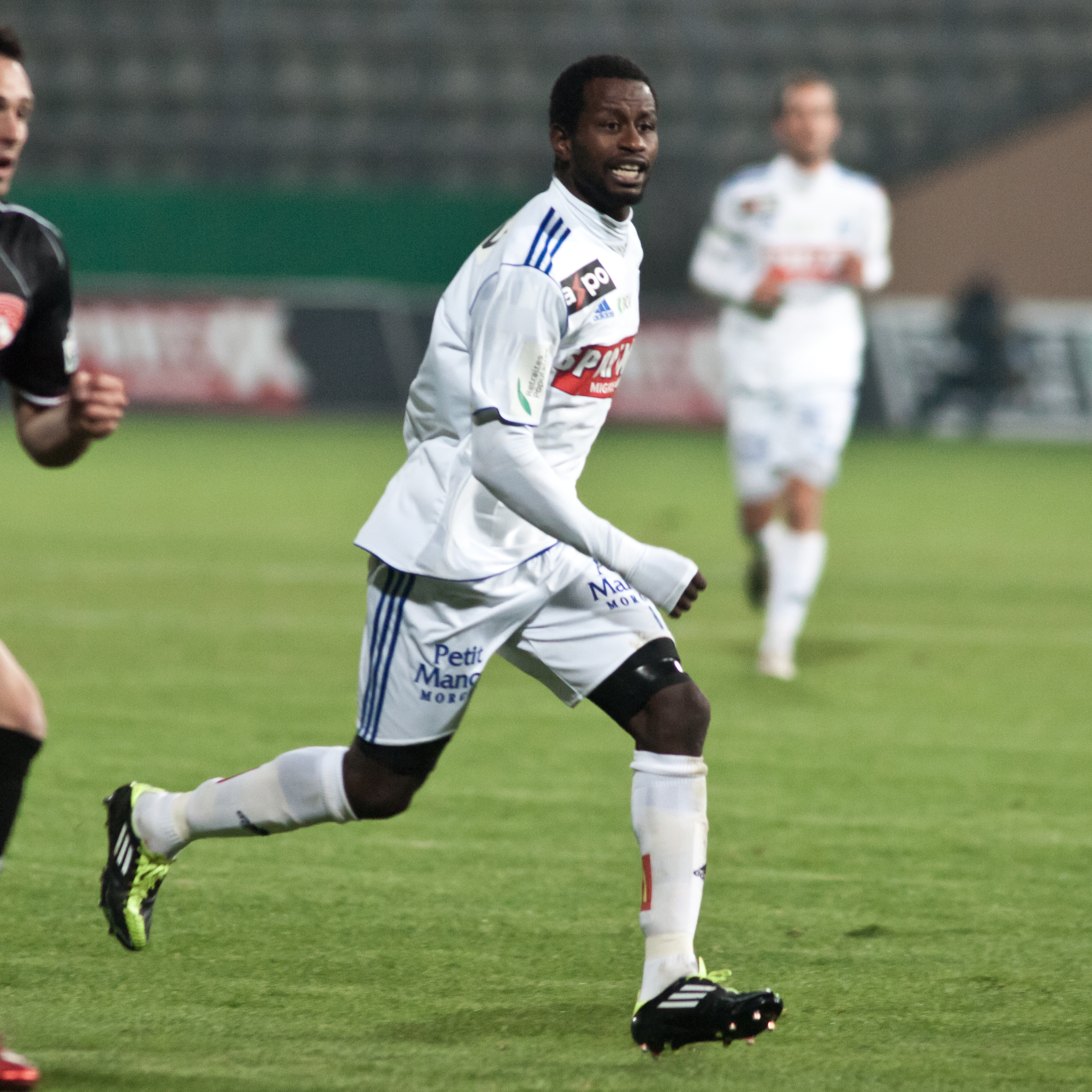

Personal information
- Full name: Thierno Lamine Bah
- Date of birth: 5 October 1982 (age 44)
- Place of birth: Labé, Guinea
- Height: 1.75 m (5 ft 9 in)
- Position: Midfielder

Senior career*
Years	Team	Apps	(Gls)
1999–2004	Servette	89	(4)
2005–2006	Meyrin	16	(1)
2006–2010	Neuchâtel Xamax	102	(0)
2011–2012	Lausanne-Sport	40	(0)
2012–2013	Al-Taawon		
2013–2014	Al Khaleej		
2015–2017	Étoile Carouge		

International career^{‡}
2002–2004	Switzerland U21	20	(0)
2011–	Guinea	10	(0)
- * Club domestic league appearances and goals as of 5 July 2012 ‡ National team caps and goals as of 5 July 2012

Thierno Bah (born 5 October 1982 in Labé, Guinea) is a Guinean former footballer. Bah is a former Switzerland youth international and represented the Swiss under-21 team. He signed for Lausanne-Sport in January 2011 and left after a year and half at the end of the 2011–2012 season.
