= Mogogi Gabonamong =

Motswana footballer

Personal information
- Date of birth: 10 September 1982 (age 44)
- Place of birth: Mmutlane, Botswana
- Height: 1.79 m (5 ft 10 in)
- Positions: Defensive midfielder; defender

Youth career
- West City
- Black Peril

Senior career*
Years	Team	Apps	(Gls)
1998–2003	Mogoditshane Fighters		
2003–2005	FC Satmos		
2004	→ Caledonia AIA (loan)		
2005–2006	Township Rollers	30	(2)
2006–2011	Engen Santos	117	(10)
2011–2013	SuperSport United	54	(4)
2014–2015	Bloemfontein Celtic	26	(2)
2015–2017	Township Rollers		

International career
1999–2015	Botswana	67	(4)
- * Club domestic league appearances and goals

Mogogi Gabonamong (born September 10, 1982) is a Motswana former footballer who played as a defensive midfielder and defender for, among others, South African Premier Soccer League club Bloemfontein Celtic and Botswana. In 2011, Mogogi was the highest paid athlete from Botswana at $354,000 (USD).

== Club career ==
Gabonamong has played for SuperSport United, Engen Santos, Township Rollers, FC Satmos, Caledonia AIA and Mogoditshane Fighters.

As a teenager he had a trial with English Premier League giants Manchester United.

== International career ==
Since making his debut for Botswana at the age of sixteen in 1999, Gabonamong has been an integral part of the country's national side.

=== International goals ===
#	Date	Venue	Opponent	Score	Result	Competition
1.	27 February 2000	National Stadium, Gaborone, Botswana	Lesotho	1–0	Win	Friendly
2.	30 September 2004	National Stadium, Gaborone, Botswana	Zambia	1–0	Win	Friendly
3.	4 June 2005	National Stadium, Gaborone, Botswana	Tunisia	1–3	Loss	2006 World Cup qualifying
4.	12 October 2010	Estadio Internacional, Malabo, Equatorial Guinea	Equatorial Guinea	0–2	Win	Friendly
Correct as of 13 January 2017
