= Ndiapo Letsholathebe =

Motswana footballer

Personal information
- Full name: Ndiapo Letsholathebe
- Date of birth: 25 February 1983 (age 43)
- Place of birth: Botswana
- Height: 1.83 m (6 ft 0 in)
- Position: Centre back

Team information
- Current team: Police XI

Senior career*
Years	Team	Apps	(Gls)
2002–	Police XI		

International career^{‡}
2003–2013	Botswana	77	(0)
- * Club domestic league appearances and goals as of 29 August 2009 ‡ National team caps and goals as of 18 November 2016

Ndiapo Letsholathebe (born 25 February 1983) is a Motswana former footballer who played for Police XI in the Mascom Premier League.
