= Ousmane Berthé =

Malian footballer

Personal information
- Date of birth: 5 February 1987 (age 39)
- Place of birth: Bamako, Mali
- Height: 1.85 m (6 ft 1 in)
- Position: Defender

Senior career*
Years	Team	Apps	(Gls)
–2008	Centre Salif Keita		
2008–2013	Jomo Cosmos	89	(4)
2013–2015	CS Constantine	36	(1)
2015–2017	Muaither SC		
2019–2020	Mohammedan		

International career
2010–2015	Mali	18	(0)
- * Club domestic league appearances and goals

Ousmane Berthé (born 5 February 1987) is a Malian professional footballer who plays as a defender.

== Club career ==
In July 2008, Berthé joined Jomo Cosmos in the South African Premier Soccer League. Berthé played his 1st game on 8 August 2009, for Jomo Cosmos against Platinum Stars, playing 66 minutes before being substituted, the match ended 0–0.
