= Oumar Sissoko =

Association football player (born 1987)

Personal information
- Date of birth: 13 September 1987 (age 39)
- Place of birth: Montreuil, France
- Height: 1.87 m (6 ft 2 in)
- Position: Goalkeeper

Team information
- Current team: FC 93
- Number: 1

Youth career
- 2000-2003: INF Clairefontaine

Senior career*
Years	Team	Apps	(Gls)
2007–2012	Metz	46	(0)
2010–2011	Metz B	9	(0)
2012–2014	Ajaccio B	9	(0)
2012–2015	Ajaccio	25	(0)
2015–2017	Orléans	59	(0)
2017–2019	Le Havre B	7	(0)
2017–2019	Le Havre	0	(0)
2019–2020	Fréjus Saint-Raphaël	4	(0)
2020–2024	Racing Besançon	82	(0)
2024–	FC 93	10	(0)

International career
2008–2017	Mali	29	(0)
- * Club domestic league appearances and goals as of 30 November 2024

Oumar Sissoko (born 13 September 1987) is a professional footballer who plays as a goalkeeper for Championnat National 1 club FC 93. Born in France, he is a former Mali international. He made 26 appearances for the Mali national team between 2008 and 2017.

== Club career ==
Sissoko was born in Montreuil, France. In the 2011–12 season he was given the number 1 jersey at Metz.

After a four-year spell in Metz, Sissoko signed a three-year contract with Ligue 1 side Ajaccio in June 2012. After the expiration of his contract, Ajaccio decided not to renew it; thus, he became a free agent.

On 2 August 2015, Sissoko signed for Orléans.

== International career ==
Sissoko played twice for the Mali national team at the Africa Cup of Nations in 2012.

== Personal life ==
His cousin Mohamed Sissoko is also a professional footballer and was also capped for Mali.

== Career statistics ==
=== Club ===
As of match played 16 April 2022

Appearances and goals by club, season and competition
Club	Season	League			National Cup		League Cup		Total	
Club	Season	Division	Apps	Goals	Apps	Goals	Apps	Goals	Apps	Goals
Metz	2008–09	Ligue 2	8	0	0	0	0	0	8	0
Metz	2009–10	Ligue 2	9	0	0	0	0	0	9	0
Metz	2010–11	Ligue 2	7	0	0	0	0	0	7	0
Metz	2011–12	Ligue 2	22	0	1	0	0	0	23	0
Metz	Total		46	0	1	0	0	0	47	0
Metz B	2010–11	CFA	8	0	—		—		8	0
Metz B	2011–12	CFA	1	0	—		—		1	0
Metz B	Total		9	0	—		—		9	0
Ajaccio B	2012–13	CFA 2	8	0	—		—		8	0
Ajaccio B	2013–14	CFA 2	1	0	—		—		1	0
Ajaccio B	Total		9	0	—		—		9	0
Ajaccio	2012–13	Ligue 1	0	0	1	0	0	0	1	0
Ajaccio	2013–14	Ligue 1	1	0	1	0	1	0	3	0
Ajaccio	2014–15	Ligue 2	24	0	1	0	1	0	26	0
Ajaccio	Total		25	0	3	0	2	0	30	0
Orléans	2015–16	National	31	0	0	0	1	0	32	0
Orléans	2016–17	Ligue 2	28	0	0	0	2	0	30	0
Orléans	Total		59	0	0	0	3	0	62	0
Le Havre B	2016–17	CFA	7	0	—		—		7	0
Le Havre	2017–18	Ligue 2	0	0	0	0	0	0	0	0
Le Havre	2018–19	Ligue 2	0	0	0	0	0	0	0	0
Le Havre	Total		0	0	0	0	0	0	0	0
Fréjus Saint-Raphaël	2019–20	National 2	4	0	0	0	—		4	0
Racing Besançon	2020–21	National 3	5	0	0	0	—		5	0
Racing Besançon	2021–22	National 3	20	0	0	0	—		20	0
Racing Besançon	Total		25	0	0	0	—		25	0
Career total			184	0	4	0	5	0	193	0

=== International ===
As of 2 August 2019

Appearances and goals by national team and year
National team	Year	Apps	Goals
Mali	2008	1	0
Mali	2010	5	0
Mali	2011	2	0
Mali	2012	2	0
Mali	2014	4	0
Mali	2015	3	0
Mali	2016	4	0
Mali	2017	5	0
Total		26	0

== See also ==
- Sub-Saharan African community of Paris
