= Modiri Marumo =

Motswana former footballer (born 1976)

Personal information
- Date of birth: 6 July 1976 (age 50)
- Place of birth: Gaborone, Botswana
- Height: 1.82 m (5 ft 11 1/2 in)
- Position: Goalkeeper

Senior career*
Years	Team	Apps	(Gls)
1996–2008	Botswana Defence Force		
2008–2010	Haras El Hodood	8	(0)
2010–2012	Bay United		
2012–2015	Polokwane City	65	(0)
Total		73	(0)

International career
1997–2015	Botswana	85	(0)
- * Club domestic league appearances and goals

Modiri Marumo (born 6 July 1976) is a Motswana former footballer who played as a goalkeeper.

== Club career ==
Born in Gaborone, Marumo began his career with Botswana Defence Force. He signed for Egyptian side Haras El Hodood in February 2008, becoming the first Botswanan player to play in Egypt's top division. He moved to South Africa in August 2010, signing with Bay United. He ended his career with Polokwane City, also in South Africa.

== International career ==
Marumo earned 85 caps for the Botswana national team between 1997 and 2015. In January 2012 he was one of a number of national team players who went on strike over a bonus row, until the president called on the players to put the nation's interest first. He initially retired from the national team in February 2012, following the 2012 Africa Cup of Nations, but returned to the national team set up in July 2012. He is the only ever goalkeeper to have been sent off in the duration of a penalty shootout.
