= Adama Tamboura =

Malian footballer (born 1985)

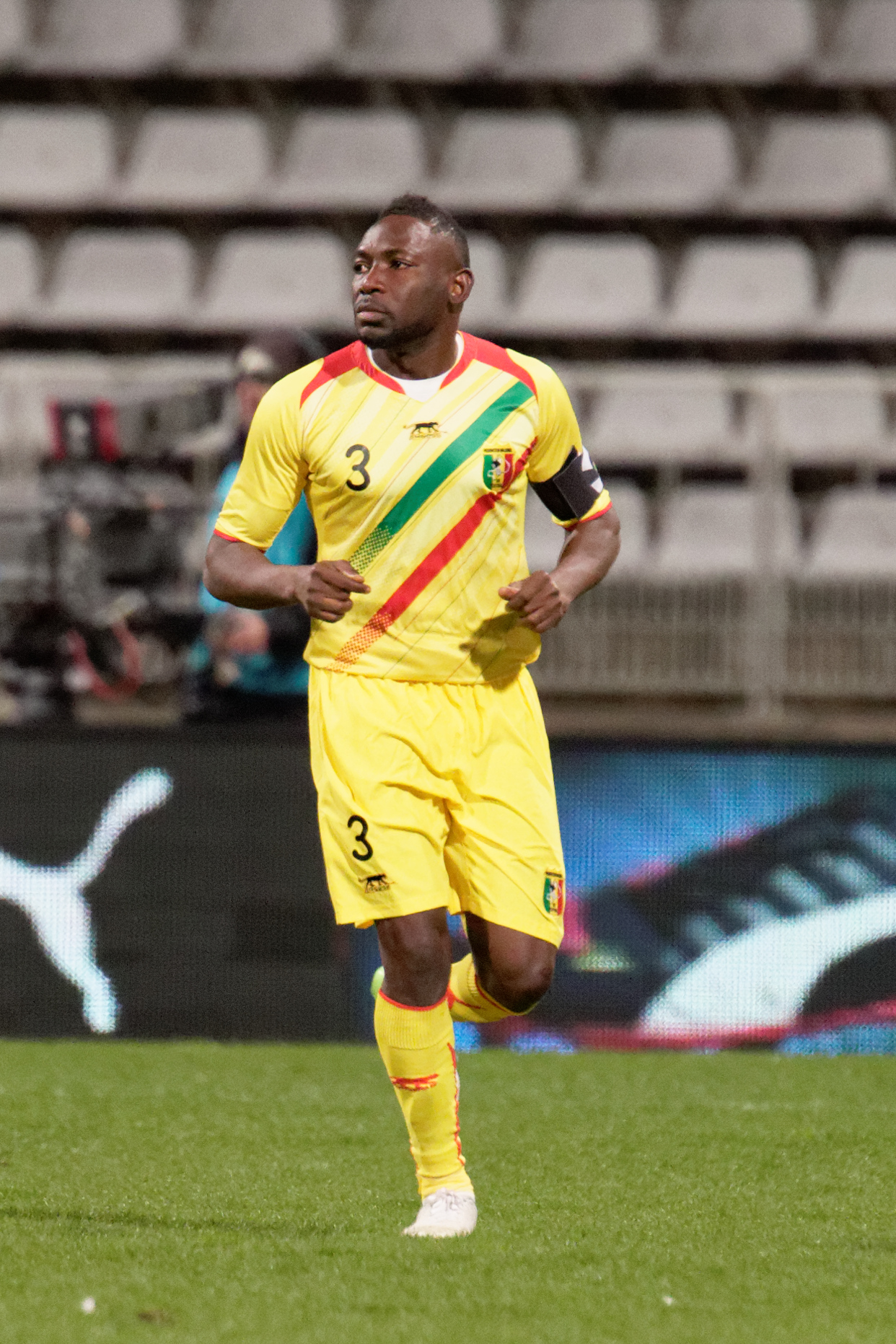
- Tamboura with Mali in 2015

Personal information
- Date of birth: 18 May 1985 (age 41)
- Place of birth: Bamako, Mali
- Height: 1.70 m (5 ft 7 in)
- Position: Left-back

Senior career*
Years	Team	Apps	(Gls)
2001–2006	Djoliba AC		
2006–2010	Helsingborgs IF	65	(0)
2010–2012	Metz	56	(0)
2012–2015	Randers FC	70	(0)
2015–2016	Hobro IK	8	(0)
2016	Inter Turku	6	(0)
Total		205	(0)

International career
2004–2015	Mali	84	(0)
Medal record
Men's football
Representing Mali
Africa Cup of Nations
Third place	2012 Eguatorial Guinea-Gabon
Third place	2013 South Africa
- * Club domestic league appearances and goals

Adama Tamboura (born 18 May 1985) is a Malian former professional footballer who played as a left-back. At international level, he made 84 appearances for the Mali national team.

== Club career ==
Born in Bamako, Mali, Tamboura began his career for Djoliba AC and on 22 August 2006, Tamboura signed a loan deal ending on 30 November with Swedish club Helsingborgs IF. On 23 November 2006, the HIF board announced that Tamboura had signed a three-year contract with the club.

On 28 January 2010, Tamboura signed for Ligue 2 side FC Metz from Helsingborgs IF until June 2012.

In July 2012 he signed a three-year contract Danish Superliga club Randers FC.

== International career ==
Tamboura was part of the Malian 2004 Olympic football team, which exited in the quarter finals, finishing top of group A, but losing to Italy in the next round.

== Honours ==
Mali

- Africa Cup of Nations bronze: 2013
