= 2012 Mascom Top 8 Cup =

Football tournament in Botswana

Tournament details
- Country: Botswana
- Teams: 8

Final positions
- Champions: Township Rollers (1st title)
- Runners-up: ECCO City Greens

Tournament statistics
- Matches played: 13
- Top goal scorer(s): Mogakolodi Ngele (6 goals)

Awards
- Best player: Ntesang Simanyana

The 2012 Mascom Top 8 Cup, also known as Mascom Top 8 Cup Season 1, was the inaugural season of the Mascom Top 8 Cup. It was played from May to 29 July 2012. It featured the top eight teams from the 2010-11 Botswana Premier League season.

Township Rollers were crowned the inaugural champions after defeating ECCO City Greens 3-1 in the final.

== History ==
The 2011-12 season was the first edition of the Mascom Top 8 Cup and was contested by the top eight teams from the previous premier league season. It was the second domestic cup in Botswana, being contested along with the 2011-12 Botswana FA Cup. The cup was predominantly southern, with only two northern teams taking part.

== Prize money ==
- Champions: P1 000 000
- Runners up: P400 000
- Semifinalists: P200 000
- Quarterfinalists: P125 000

== Format ==
A draw was conducted to decide the opponents. Quarterfinals were then played both home and away to determine the semifinalists. At the end of the quarterfinals the remaining teams were again drawn for a two-leg semifinal. The final was played only once. Three points were awarded for a win, one for a draw and none for a loss. Aggregate score was used to determine the winner and where it was a tie then away goals were used and penalties if it was still a tie.

== Quarterfinals ==
First legs
Date	Home	Score	Away
	Gaborone United		Uniao Flamengo Santos
	BMC		ECCO City Greens
	Township Rollers		BDF XI
	Mochudi Centre Chiefs		Uniao Flamengo Santos

Second legs
Date	Home	Score	Away
	Uniao Flamengo Santos		Gaborone United
	ECCO City Greens		BMC
	BDF XI		Township Rollers
	Uniao Flamengo Santos		Mochudi Centre Chiefs

== Semifinals ==
First legs
Date	Home	Score	Away
June 16	ECCO City Greens	0-0	Mochudi Centre Chiefs
June 17	Township Rollers	2-1	Gaborone United

Second legs
Date	Home	Score	Away
	Mochudi Centre Chiefs	1-1	ECCO City Greens
July 1	Gaborone United	1-2	Township Rollers

== Final ==
| July 29 | Township Rollers | 3-1 | ECCO City Greens

== Awards ==
- Top goalscorer | (Botswana) Mogakolodi Ngele (6 goals) | Township Rollers
- Player of the tournament | (Botswana) Ntesang Simanyana | Township Rollers
- Goalkeeper of the tournament | (Botswana) Kabelo Dambe | Township Rollers
- Coach of the tournament | (Botswana) Atshele Molapi | ECCO City Greens
- Referee of the tournament | (Botswana) Kutlwano Leso
- Assistant referee of the tournament | (Botswana) Moemedi Monakwane
- Best electronic journalist (radio) | (Botswana) McDonald Rakgare | Duma FM
- Best electronic journalist (TV) | (Botswana) Benjamin Radimo | BTV
- Best radio commentator | (Botswana) Fundi

Gaoforwe | RB2

- Best print journalist | Witness Taziba | Midweek Sun & Botswana Guardian
- Best TV commentator | (Botswana) Mmoloki Mothibi | BTV
- Best photographer | (Botswana) Oaitse Sejakgomo | Sunday Standard
