= Naby Yattara =

Guinean footballer

Personal information
- Full name: Naby Moussa Yattara
- Date of birth: 12 January 1984 (age 42)
- Place of birth: Conakry, Guinea
- Height: 1.85 m (6 ft 1 in)
- Position: Goalkeeper

Team information
- Current team: Stade Beaucairois
- Number: 1

Youth career
- Étoile de Guinée

Senior career*
Years	Team	Apps	(Gls)
2000–2001	Étoile de Guinée	22	(0)
2002	Athlético de Coléah	14	(0)
2002–2006	Royal Antwerp	3	(0)
2006–2008	Couillet	35	(0)
2008–2009	Sète	34	(0)
2009–2015	Arles-Avignon	14	(0)
2016–2018	Paulhan-Pézenas	47	(0)
2018–2020	AS Excelsior		
2020–	Stade Beaucairois	41	(0)

International career^{‡}
2007–	Guinea	61	(0)
- * Club domestic league appearances and goals as of 17:46, 11 October 2023 (UTC) ‡ National team caps and goals as of 02:49, 9 April 2022 (UTC)

Naby-Moussa Yattara (born 12 January 1984) is a Guinean professional footballer who plays as a goalkeeper for Championnat National 3 club Stade Beaucairois and the Guinea national team.

== International career ==
Yattara was member of the Guinea national team at the 2008 Africa Cup of Nations in Ghana. His debut was in October 2007 in a 3–1 defeat against Senegal in Rouen.

== Career statistics ==
=== International ===
As of match played on 14 July 2019

Guinea
Year	Apps	Goals
2007	2	0
2008	4	0
2009	3	0
2010	4	0
2011	8	0
2012	8	0
2013	2	0
2014	8	0
2015	8	0
2016	7	0
2017	3	0
2018	1	0
2019	1	0
Total	59	0
