= Stanley Tshosane =

Botswana football manager

Personal information
- Full name: Stanley Hunter Tshosane
- Date of birth: 16 January 1957
- Place of birth: Jackalas 1
- Date of death: 25 April 2025 (aged 68)
- Position: Winger

Senior career*
Years	Team	Apps	(Gls)
- BDF XI

Managerial career
- 1988: Matebejane
- 1992: Gabane United
- 1993–98: Mogoditshane Fighters
- 1998: Gabane Santos
- 1997: Botswana Under 20 (assistant)
- 1999: BDF XI (assistant)
- 2000: BDF XI
- 2002: Botswana (caretaker)
- 2008: Botswana (caretaker)
- 2008–2013: Botswana
- * Club domestic league appearances and goals

Stanley Tshosane (16 January 1957 – 25 April 2025) was a Motswana football manager.

== Career ==
He was appointed to the position of Botswana manager in 2008, following a short spell as caretaker manager. He was sacked in October 2013.

Critics suggested he was only offered the job because the Botswana Football Association could not afford to hire a better reputed "name".

Previously he had been assistant to English manager Colwyn Rowe for the national team.

Whilst working as an assistant for the national, he had also been manager of the Botswana Defence Force's football team BDF XI.

As a player, he had also played for BDF XI.

Prior to his spell at BDF XI, he had been the manager of the national team previously in 2002.
