= Franceville Stadium =

Stadium in Franceville, Gabon

Coordinates: 1°38′19″S 13°34′28″E

- Interactive map of Franceville Stadium
- Location: Franceville, Gabon
- Owner: Government of Gabon
- Capacity: 22,000
- Field size: 105 x 68 m

Construction
- Groundbreaking: March 2010
- Opened: January 2012

Tenant
- Gabon national football team (2012–present)

The Franceville Stadium is a stadium in Franceville, Gabon. The 22,000 capacity stadium was opened in January 2012, in time for its use in the 2012 African Cup of Nations. The opening game was a friendly between Gabon and Sudan.
