= Botswana national football team =

Botswana
- Nickname: Dipitse (The Zebras)
- Association: Botswana Football Association (BFA)
- Confederation: CAF (Africa)
- Sub-confederation: COSAFA (Southern Africa)
- Head coach: Vacant
- Captain: Thatayaone Ditlhokwe
- Most caps: Mosha Gaolaolwe (97)
- Top scorer: Jerome Ramatlhakwane (24)
- Home stadium: Botswana National Stadium
- FIFA code: BOT
First colours	Second colours	Third colours

FIFA ranking
- Current: 141 ▲6 (7 October 2026)
- Highest: 53 (December 2010)
- Lowest: 165 (November 1999 – February 2000)

First international
- Malawi 8–1 Botswana (Malawi; 13 July 1968)

Biggest win
- Botswana 6–0 Mauritius (Polokwane, South Africa; 1 June 2018)

Biggest defeat
- Malawi 8–1 Botswana (Malawi; 13 July 1968); Botswana 0–7 Zimbabwe (Gaborone, Botswana; 26 August 1990)

Africa Cup of Nations
- Appearances: 2 (first in 2012)
- Best result: Group stage (2012, 2025)

COSAFA Cup
- Appearances: 19 (first in 1997)
- Best result: Runners-up (2016, 2019)
Medal record
COSAFA Cup
Silver medal – second place	2016 Namibia	Team
Silver medal – second place	2019 South Africa

The Botswana national football team (Tswana: Setlhopha sa bosetšhaba sa kgwele ya dinao sa Botswana) represents Botswana in men's international association football. It is governed by the Botswana Football Association (BFA) which was founded in 1970.

As of December 2025, the team has qualified for two editions of Africa Cup of Nations, in 2012 and 2025, and it has not managed to qualify for the FIFA World Cup. The team also participates in the regional COSAFA Cup which is open to Southern African national teams and takes place annually; Botswana's best result in the cup to date is finishing runners-up in the 2016 and 2019 editions.

== History ==
Botswana's first unofficial match was an 8–1 loss against Malawi on 13 July 1968, and they became affiliated with CAF in early 1976. Botswana's first official match was the 3–2 loss against Zambia on 30 August 1976. Botswana then joined FIFA in 1978.

It took part in its first preliminary competition for the 1994 World Cup in the United States, where it faced Niger and Ivory Coast. It managed a 0–0 draw with the latter in Gaborone, and lost its other 3 matches, finishing last in its group.

The next competition it entered was for the 2002 World Cup, where it faced Zambia in a 2-legged tie to decide which team would advance to the group stages. Zambia won both legs of the tie to qualify and knock Botswana out.

After this, Botswana lost 3–0 to Zambia and to second-string sides from South Africa and Zimbabwe at home in Gaborone. A draw with Madagascar which was ranked at 146th in the world at the time, led Botswana FA to sack manager Colwyn Rowe, who had guided Botswana to its then-highest ever FIFA ranking of 95th. BFA claimed this move was taken because it feared for his safety from angry fans. Stanley Tshosane was named as his replacement and in his first game in charge, Botswana achieved a 2–1 win away to Mozambique. While achieving a draw with Ivory Coast, Botswana finished bottom of its qualifying group for the 2010 World Cup in South Africa.

Botswana defied its ranking to become the first team to qualify for the 2012 Africa Cup of Nations, beating Tunisia both at home and away. This coincided with a rise to its highest ever FIFA ranking of 53rd. It did not manage to build upon this upturn in form at the tournament, losing more narrowly to Ghana and Mali and more heavily to Guinea to finish bottom of its group with 0 points.

The truncated qualification format for the 2013 Africa Cup of Nations saw Botswana face Mali in a two-legged tie, which Botswana lost 7–1 on aggregate. Botswana failed to qualify for the 2014 World Cup, finishing third in its group with 7 points behind South Africa and Ethiopia.

In October 2013, BFA sacked Tshosane, citing his "failing to meet the targets set for him". It subsequently appointed Englishman Peter Butler in February 2014.

Beating Burundi and Guinea-Bissau in the knockout rounds, it finished last in its qualifying group for the 2015 Africa Cup of Nations with a single point. In its qualifying group for the 2017 Africa Cup of Nations, it finished third - 7 points behind qualifiers Burkina Faso and Uganda. In the qualifiers for the 2018 World Cup, it beat Eritrea in the first round and won 2–1 at home against Mali in the first leg of the second round. A 2–0 win for Mali in Bamako meant that Botswana lost on aggregate and failed to make the group stages.

In July 2017, David Bright became manager of the Zebras for the 4th time after BFA chose not to renew Butler's contract. He led the team during qualifiers for the 2019 Africa Cup of Nations, in which Botswana scored only 1 goal in its 6 Group I matches.

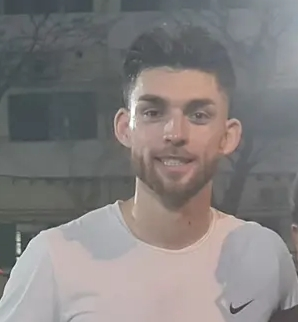
Brandon Wilson received his first call up for Botswana in 2023

Botswana made a poor start to their 2025 Africa Cup of Nations qualification campaign, with two losses leading many to believe they had little chance of making it to Morocco. Despite this, they then picked up eight points from a possible twelve on offer, a 1–1 draw away against Egypt in their last match of the campaign sealing qualification for only their second ever Africa Cup of Nations. This was despite manager Didier Gomes Da Rosa resigning to take charge of Al Ahli, meaning Morena Ramoreboli took interim charge for the team's last two matches.

== Results and fixtures ==
The following is a list of match results in the last 12 months, as well as any future matches that have been scheduled.

Win Draw Loss Fixture

=== 2025 ===
18 December Friendly	Tunisia	2–1	Botswana	Tabarka, Tunisia
15:00 UTC+1	Sliti 85', 90+4' (pen.)	Report	Orebonye 50'	Stadium: Tabarka Training Center; Attendance: 0 (Behind closed doors)

23 December 2025 AFCON Group Stage	Senegal	3–0	Botswana	Tangier, Morocco
16:00 UTC+1	Jackson 40', 58'; C. Ndiaye 90'	Report		Stadium: Ibn Batouta Stadium; Attendance: 18,591; Referee: Abdel Aziz Bouh (Mauritania)

27 December 2025 AFCON Group Stage	Benin	1–0	Botswana	Rabat, Morocco
13:30 UTC+1	Roche 28'	Report		Stadium: Rabat Olympic Stadium; Referee: Shamirah Nabadda (Uganda)

30 December 2025 AFCON Group Stage	Botswana	0–3	DR Congo	Rabat, Morocco
20:00 UTC+1		Report	Mbuku 31'; Kakuta 41' (pen.), 60'	Stadium: Al Barid Stadium; Referee: Ahmad Heeralall (Mauritius)

=== 2026 ===
28 March Mukuru Four Nations Tournament Semi-finals	Botswana	0–3	Zimbabwe	Francistown, Botswana
18:15 UTC+2		Report	Tshuma 24'; Bonne 33'; Antonio 45'	Stadium: Obed Itani Chilume Stadium; Referee: Chanshi Kasongo (Zambia)

31 March Mukuru Four Nations Tournament 3rd place play-offs	Botswana	0–1	Malawi	Francistown, Botswana
16:00 UTC+2		Report	Tshuma 66'	Stadium: Obed Itani Chilume Stadium; Referee: Owen Manenda (Zimbabwe)

24 September 2027 AFCON qualification	Libya	2–2	Botswana	Tripoli, Libya
15:00 UTC+0	Alhibeeshi 87'; El Maremi 90+6' (pen.)	Report	Orebonye 30', 42'	Stadium: Tripoli International Olympic Stadium; Referee: Jean Pierre Nguiene Bissila (Congo)

29 September 2027 AFCON qualification	Botswana	2–2	Tunisia	Tunis, Tunisia
20:00 UTC+1	Kgamanyane 38'; Ditsele 60'	Report	Mastouri 44', 49'	Stadium: Hammadi Agrebi Stadium; Referee: Ahmed Arajiga (Tanzania)

11 November 2027 AFCON qualification	Uganda	v	Botswana	TBD, Uganda
TBD				Stadium: TBD

15 November 2027 AFCON qualification	Botswana	v	Uganda	TBD, Botswana
TBD				Stadium: TBD

=== 2027 ===
24 March 2027 AFCON qualification	Botswana	v	Libya	TBD, Botswana
TBD				Stadium: TBD

28 March 2027 AFCON qualification	Tunisia	v	Botswana	TBD, Tunisia
TBD				Stadium: TBD

== Coaching history ==
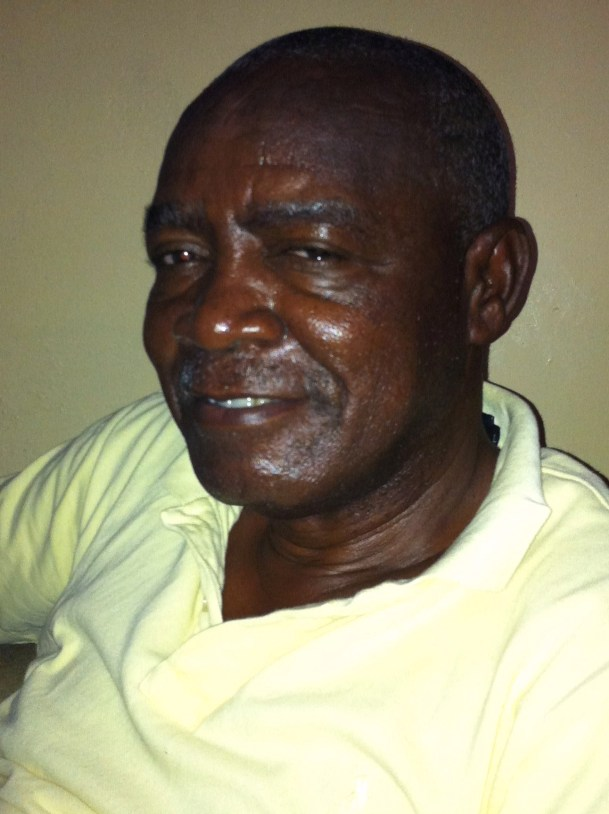
Freddie Mwila managed the national football team of Botswana in the 1990s

Caretaker managers are listed in italics.

- (South Africa) Thomas Johnson (1973)
- (West Germany) Rudi Gutendorf (1976)
- (Scotland) Peter Cormack (1986–1987)
- (Zambia) Kenny Mwape (1990–1992)
- (Zambia) Freddie Mwila (1992–1994)
- (Zambia) Freddie Mwila (1994–1996)
- (Botswana) Michael Gaborone (1996–1997)
- (Botswana) David Bright (1997–1998)
- (Botswana) David Bright (1999)
- (England) Jeff Butler (1999)
- (Botswana) David Bright (2000)
- (Germany) Karl-Heinz Marotzke (2001)
- (Serbia and Montenegro) Veselin Jelušić (2002–2005)
- (Botswana) David Bright (2006)
- (England) Colwyn Rowe (2006–2008)
- (Botswana) Stanley Tshosane (2008–2013)
- (England) Peter Butler (2014–2017)
- (Botswana) Mogomotsi Mpote (2017)
- (Botswana) David Bright (2017–2019)
- (Botswana) Mfolo Mfolo (2019)
- (Botswana) Mogomotsi Mpote (2019)
- (Algeria) Adel Amrouche (2019–2022)
- (Zimbabwe) Rahman Gumbo (2022)
- (Botswana) Mogomotsi Mpote (2022–2023)
- (France) Didier Gomes Da Rosa (2023-2024)
- (South Africa) Morena Ramoreboli (2025-2026)

== Players ==
=== Current squad ===
The following players were called up for the Mukuru Four Nations Tournament on 28 and 31 March 2026.

Caps and goals correct as of 31 March 2026, after the match against Malawi.

No.	Pos.	Player	Date of birth (age)	Caps	Goals	Club
	GK	Goitseone Phoko	13 December 1994 (age 31)	40	1	(Botswana Football Association) Jwaneng Galaxy
	GK	Thabo Motswagole	22 April 2000 (age 26)	3	0	(Botswana Football Association) Gaborone United
	GK	Cedric Ramojela	28 September 2002 (age 24)	1	0	(Botswana Football Association) Tonota
	DF	Tebogo Kopelang	24 April 2000 (age 26)	34	3	(Botswana Football Association) Jwaneng Galaxy
	DF	Tlamelo Kolagano	2 August 2001 (age 25)	10	0	(Botswana Football Association) Jwaneng Galaxy
	DF	Botsile Sakana	26 January 2001 (age 25)	7	0	(Botswana Football Association) Orapa United
	DF	Thabo Babutsi	24 July 2000 (age 26)	6	0	(Botswana Football Association) Orapa United
	DF	Ricky Ratlhogo	8 December 2000 (age 25)	5	0	(Botswana Football Association) Orapa United
	DF	Thato Mosweunyane	23 January 2003 (age 23)	2	0	(Botswana Football Association) Morupule Wanderers
	DF	Larona Modisaemang		1	0	(Botswana Football Association) Jwaneng Galaxy
	DF	Floyd Motheo		0	0	(Botswana Football Association) Matebele
	DF	Utlwang Ramakgathi		0	0	(Botswana Football Association) Matebele
	MF	Monty Enosa	6 February 2004 (age 22)	8	0	(Botswana Football Association) Mochudi Centre Chiefs
	MF	Omphile Ramoagi	3 January 2004 (age 22)	5	0	(Botswana Football Association) Gaborone United
	MF	Theo Shadikong	26 March 2002 (age 24)	3	0	(Botswana Football Association) Mochudi Centre Chiefs
	MF	Philip Kaku	25 February 2005 (age 21)	2	0	(Botswana Football Association) Township Rollers
	MF	Kamogelo Moloi	22 August 2006 (age 20)	1	1	(Botswana Football Association) Gaborone United
	MF	Nonofo Dikutu	23 November 2003 (age 22)	0	0	(Botswana Football Association) Matebele
	MF	Keitumetse Samunzala		0	0	(Botswana Football Association) Jwaneng Galaxy
	FW	Godfrey Tauyatswala	25 January 2001 (age 25)	11	1	(Botswana Football Association) Township Rollers
	FW	Eric Ookame	3 April 2001 (age 25)	7	0	(Royal Moroccan Football Federation) MC Oujda
	FW	Oarabile Sekwai	28 November 1998 (age 27)	7	0	(Botswana Football Association) Orapa United
	FW	Tshepho Keselebale	19 February 2001 (age 25)	6	0	(Botswana Football Association) Jwaneng Galaxy
	FW	Losika Ratshukudu	1 February 2006 (age 20)	3	0	(Croatian Football Federation) Slaven Belupo
	FW	Boikobo Matakule		1	0	(Botswana Football Association) Police XI
	FW	Kgotso Radithongwa	8 February 2004 (age 22)	1	0	(Botswana Football Association) Jwaneng Galaxy

=== Recent call-ups ===
The following players were last called up within the last twelve months.

Pos.	Player	Date of birth (age)	Caps	Goals	Club	Latest call-up
GK	Karamelo Kgosipula	6 February 2003 (age 23)	6	0	(Botswana) Matebele	v. Zimbabwe, 28 March 2026^{PRE}
GK	Kenneth Mmoko	13 October 1999 (age 27)	0	0	(Botswana) Sua Flamingoes	v. Zimbabwe, 28 March 2026^{PRE}
GK	Kabelo Dambe	10 May 1990 (age 36)	63	0	(Botswana) Township Rollers	2025 AFCON
GK	Lesenya Malapela	10 July 1996 (age 30)	7	0	(Botswana) Orapa United	2025 AFCON
DF	Mosha Gaolaolwe	25 December 1993 (age 32)	97	2	(Botswana) Township Rollers	2025 AFCON
DF	Thatayaone Ditlhokwe (captain)	21 September 1998 (age 28)	44	2	(Jordan) Al-Wehdat	2025 AFCON
DF	Mothusi Johnson	28 July 1997 (age 29)	38	1	(Botswana) Gaborone United	2025 AFCON
DF	Alford Velaphi	18 January 1999 (age 27)	36	0	(Botswana) Gaborone United	2025 AFCON
DF	Thabo Leinanyane	27 July 1993 (age 33)	21	0	(Botswana) Jwaneng Galaxy	2025 AFCON
MF	Gape Thibedi	2 February 2000 (age 26)	14	0	(Botswana) Gaborone United	v. Zimbabwe, 28 March 2026^{PRE}
MF	Shaun Theron	11 March 2003 (age 23)	0	0	(Botswana) Jwaneng Galaxy	v. Zimbabwe, 28 March 2026^{PRE}
MF	Lebogang Ditsele	20 April 1996 (age 30)	62	3	(Botswana) Gaborone United	2025 AFCON
MF	Gape Mohutsiwa	20 March 1997 (age 29)	37	4	(Algeria) MC Oran	2025 AFCON
MF	Godiraone Modingwane	26 June 1996 (age 30)	30	0	Botswana Defence Force	2025 AFCON
MF	Gilbert Baruti	16 March 1992 (age 34)	25	1	(Botswana) Jwaneng Galaxy	2025 AFCON
MF	Olebogeng Ramotse	17 January 1998 (age 28)	17	0	(Botswana) Masitaoka	2025 AFCON
MF	Koketso Majafi	7 November 1992 (age 33)	6	0	(Botswana) Orapa United	2025 AFCON
FW	Kabelo Seakanyeng	25 June 1993 (age 33)	77	10	(Morocco) Maghreb of Fez	2025 AFCON
FW	Tumisang Orebonye	26 March 1996 (age 30)	65	7	(Libya) Al-Ittihad	2025 AFCON
FW	Segolame Boy	7 November 1992 (age 33)	49	5	(Botswana) Township Rollers	2025 AFCON
FW	Thabang Sesinyi	15 October 1992 (age 34)	39	4	(Botswana) Jwaneng Galaxy	2025 AFCON
FW	Omaatla Kebatho	16 June 1993 (age 33)	30	3	(Botswana) Jwaneng Galaxy	2025 AFCON

== Player records ==
As of 30 December 2025
Players in bold are still active with Botswana.

=== Most appearances ===
Rank	Player	Caps	Goals	Career
1	**Mosha Gaolaolwe**	97	2	2013–present
2	Joel Mogorosi	93	16	2005–2019
3	Mompati Thuma	92	1	2004–2013
4	Modiri Marumo	88	0	1997–2015
5	Ndiapo Letsholathebe	78	0	2003–2013
6	**Kabelo Seakanyeng**	77	10	2014–present
7	Tshepo Motlhabankwe	76	2	2003–2013
8	Mogogi Gabonamong	74	4	1999–2015
9	Dipsy Selolwane	68	18	1998–2012
10	**Tumisang Orebonye**	65	7	2017–present

=== Top goalscorers ===
Rank	Player	Goals	Caps	Ratio	Career
1	Jerome Ramatlhakwane	24	61	0.39	2006–2018
2	Dipsy Selolwane	18	68	0.26	1998–2012
3	Joel Mogorosi	16	93	0.17	2005–2019
4	Lemponye Tshireletso	11	64	0.17	2009–2020
5	Onkabetse Makgantai	10	29	0.34	2014–2021
5	**Kabelo Seakanyeng**	10	77	0.13	2014–present
7	Moemedi Moatlhaping	9	51	0.18	2004–2013
8	Tshepiso Molwantwa	8	45	0.18	1998–2006
9	Pontsho Moloi	7	51	0.14	2004–2012
9	**Tumisang Orebonye**	7	65	0.11	2017–present

== Competitive records ==
=== FIFA World Cup ===
FIFA World Cup record									Qualification record					
Year	Round	Position	Pld	W	D*	L	GF	GA	Pld	W	D	L	GF	GA
1970 to 1978	Not a FIFA member								Not a FIFA member					
1982 to 1990	Did not enter								Declined participation					
(United States) 1994	Did not qualify								4	0	1	3	1	9
(France) 1998	Did not enter								Did not enter					
(South Korea) (Japan) 2002	Did not qualify								2	0	0	2	0	2
(Germany) 2006	Did not qualify								12	4	1	7	14	19
(South Africa) 2010	Did not qualify								6	1	2	3	3	8
(Brazil) 2014	Did not qualify								6	2	1	3	8	10
(Russia) 2018	Did not qualify								4	3	0	1	7	4
(Qatar) 2022	Did not qualify								2	0	1	1	0	1
(Canada) (Mexico) (United States) 2026	Did not qualify								10	3	1	6	12	16
(Morocco) (Portugal) (Spain) 2030	To be determined								To be determined					
(Saudi Arabia) 2034	To be determined								To be determined					
Total		0/11							46	13	7	26	45	69

=== Africa Cup of Nations ===
Africa Cup of Nations record									Qualification record					
Year	Round	Position	Pld	W	D	L	GF	GA	Pld	W	D	L	GF	GA
(Sudan) 1957	Part of United Kingdom								Part of United Kingdom					
(United Arab Republic) 1959	Part of United Kingdom								Part of United Kingdom					
(Ethiopia) 1962	Part of United Kingdom								Part of United Kingdom					
(Ghana) 1963	Part of United Kingdom								Part of United Kingdom					
(Tunisia) 1965	Part of United Kingdom								Part of United Kingdom					
(Ethiopia) 1968	Not affiliated to CAF								Not affiliated to CAF					
(Sudan) 1970	Not affiliated to CAF								Not affiliated to CAF					
(Egypt) 1974	Not affiliated to CAF								Not affiliated to CAF					
(Ethiopia) 1976	Not affiliated to CAF								Not affiliated to CAF					
(Ghana) 1978	Did not enter								Did not enter					
(Nigeria) 1980	Did not enter								Did not enter					
(Libya) 1982	Did not enter								Did not enter					
(Ivory Coast) 1984	Did not enter								Did not enter					
(Egypt) 1986	Did not enter								Did not enter					
(Morocco) 1988	Did not enter								Did not enter					
(Algeria) 1990	Did not enter								Did not enter					
(Senegal) 1992	Did not enter								Did not enter					
(Tunisia) 1994	Did not qualify								2	0	1	1	0	4
(South Africa) 1996	Did not qualify								10	0	2	8	5	27
(Burkina Faso) 1998	Did not qualify								2	0	1	1	0	6
(Ghana) (Nigeria) 2000	Did not qualify								2	0	1	1	1	2
(Mali) 2002	Did not qualify								2	1	0	1	1	3
(Tunisia) 2004	Did not qualify								6	0	3	3	2	6
(Egypt) 2006	Did not qualify								12	4	1	7	14	19
(Ghana) 2008	Did not qualify								6	2	1	3	3	7
(Angola) 2010	Did not qualify								6	1	2	3	3	8
(Equatorial Guinea) (Gabon) 2012	Group stage	16th	3	0	0	3	2	9	8	5	2	1	7	3
(South Africa) 2013	Did not qualify								2	0	0	2	1	7
(Equatorial Guinea) 2015	Did not qualify								8	1	2	5	2	11
(Gabon) 2017	Did not qualify								6	2	0	4	5	8
(Egypt) 2019	Did not qualify								6	0	1	5	1	8
(Cameroon) 2021	Did not qualify								6	1	1	4	2	9
(Ivory Coast) 2023	Did not qualify								6	1	1	4	3	9
(Morocco) 2025	Group stage	24th	3	0	0	3	0	7	6	2	2	2	4	7
(Kenya) (Tanzania) (Uganda) 2027	To be determined								To be determined					
2029	To be determined								To be determined					
Total	Group stage	2/35	6	0	0	6	2	16	96	20	20	55	54	144

== Head-to-head record ==
As of 28 September 2026 after match against Tunisia

Key
Positive balance (more Wins)
Neutral balance (Wins = Losses)
Negative balance (more Losses)

Opponent	Pld	W	D	L	GF	GA	GD
Algeria	4	0	0	4	2	12	−10
Angola	14	2	6	6	6	14	−8
Benin	1	0	0	1	0	1	−1
Burkina Faso	6	2	1	3	3	7	−4
Burundi	5	2	2	1	2	1	+1
Central African Republic	2	1	0	1	3	4	−1
Cameroon	1	0	1	0	0	0	0
Cape Verde	2	2	0	0	2	0	+2
Chad	2	2	0	0	2	0	+2
China	2	0	0	2	1	6	−5
Comoros	5	2	2	1	3	2	+1
DR Congo	6	0	3	3	0	7	−7
Egypt	8	0	3	5	2	12	−10
Equatorial Guinea	3	1	0	2	4	5	–1
Eritrea	2	2	0	0	5	1	+4
Ethiopia	4	2	0	2	7	4	+3
Gabon	1	0	1	0	0	0	0
Ghana	2	0	1	1	0	1	−1
Guinea	7	1	1	5	5	20	−15
Guinea-Bissau	2	1	1	0	3	1	+2
Iran	1	0	1	0	1	1	0
Iraq	1	0	1	0	1	1	0
Ivory Coast	4	0	2	2	1	11	−10
Kenya	7	3	0	4	7	10	−3
Lesotho	31	15	11	5	39	23	+16
Liberia	1	0	1	1	1	3	−2
Libya	6	1	3	2	3	4	−1
Madagascar	8	1	2	3	4	5	−1
Malawi	26	6	8	12	22	47	−25
Mali	7	1	0	6	5	19	−14
Mauritania	6	1	1	4	4	10	−6
Mauritius	3	1	1	1	6	1	+5
Morocco	2	0	0	2	0	2	−2
Mozambique	25	5	5	15	19	40	−21
Namibia	20	7	11	2	19	18	+1
New Zealand	1	0	1	0	0	0	0
Niger	3	0	1	2	2	4	−2
Nigeria	1	0	1	0	0	0	0
Senegal	3	0	0	3	0	8	−8
Rwanda	1	0	1	0	0	0	0
Seychelles	4	4	0	0	8	1	+7
Somalia	2	2	0	0	5	1	+4
South Africa	20	0	6	14	10	31	−21
South Sudan	1	1	0	0	3	0	+3
Swaziland	32	16	11	5	46	26	+20
Sweden	1	0	0	1	1	2	−1
Tanzania	5	1	2	2	7	9	−2
Togo	2	1	0	1	2	2	0
Trinidad and Tobago	1	0	1	0	0	0	0
Tunisia	9	2	3	4	7	14	−7
Uganda	7	0	2	5	2	9	−7
Zambia	27	4	8	15	15	42	−27
Zimbabwe	20	4	5	11	9	26	−17
Total	367	96	103	168	299	463	−168

== Honours ==
=== Regional ===
- COSAFA Cup
  - (silver) Runners-up (2): 2016, 2019

=== Awards ===
- African National Team of the Year (1): 2011
