= 2010 Africa Cup of Nations Group A =

Football tournament group stage

Group A was one of four groups of national teams competing at the 2010 Africa Cup of Nations. The group's first round of matches began on January 10 and its last matches were played on January 18. Most matches were played at the Estádio 11 de Novembro in Luanda and featured the host Angola, joined by Mali, Algeria, and Malawi. The opening day saw an extraordinary game which saw Mali come four goals down to tie Angola 4-4, although it was Angola that made it to the second round.

== Standings ==
Pos	Team	Pld	W	D	L	GF	GA	GD	Pts	Qualification
1	Angola (H)	3	1	2	0	6	4	+2	5	Advance to knockout stage
2	Algeria	3	1	1	1	1	3	−2	4 (Note: Algeria finished ahead of Mali due to winning the match between the teams (see tie-breaking criteria).)	Advance to knockout stage
3	Mali	3	1	1	1	7	6	+1	4	
4	Malawi	3	1	0	2	4	5	−1	3	

Source: CAF
(H) Hosts

== Angola vs Mali ==
10 January 2010
20:00

Angola	4–4	Mali
Flávio 36', 42'; Gilberto 67' (pen.); Manucho 74' (pen.)	Report	Keita 79', 90+3'; Kanouté 88'; Yatabaré 90+4'

Estádio 11 de Novembro, Luanda
Attendance: 45,000
Referee: Essam Abdel-Fatah (Egypt)

GK	13	Carlos
CB	15	Rui Marques
CB	10	Zuela
CB	5	Kali
RM	21	Mabiná
CM	20	Stélvio	(yellow card) 45'
CM	8	Xara	(yellow card) 61'
CM	19	Dédé		(substituted off) 25'
LM	11	Gilberto		(substituted off) 81'
CF	23	Manucho
CF	16	Flávio		(substituted off) 83'
Substitutions:
FW	14	Djalma		(substituted in) 25'
DF	3	Enoque		(substituted in) 81'
FW	18	Love		(substituted in) 83'
Manager:
(Portugal) Manuel José

GK	1	Mahamadou Sidibé
RB	13	Bakary Soumaré	(yellow card) 45+2'
CB	2	Ousmane Berthé
CB	5	Souleymane Diamouténé
LB	3	Adama Tamboura
DM	6	Mahamadou Diarra	(yellow card) 77'
CM	15	Bakaye Traoré		(substituted off) 57'
CM	17	Mahamane Traoré	(yellow card) 72'
RW	8	Mamadou Diallo		(substituted off) 75'
LW	10	Modibo Maïga		(substituted off) 34'
CF	19	Frédéric Kanouté
Substitutions:
MF	12	Seydou Keita	(yellow card) 73'	(substituted in) 34'
MF	20	Lassana Fané		(substituted in) 57'
FW	21	Mustapha Yatabaré		(substituted in) 75'
Manager:
(Nigeria) Stephen Keshi

== Malawi vs Algeria ==
11 January 2010
14:45

Malawi	3–0	Algeria
Mwafulirwa 17'; Kafoteka 35'; Banda 48'	Report

Estádio 11 de Novembro, Luanda
Attendance: 1,000
Referee: Badara Diatta (Senegal)

GK	1	Swadic Sanudi	(yellow card) 81'
DF	3	Moses Chavula
DF	5	James Sangala
DF	7	Peter Mponda
DF	12	Elvis Kafoteka
MF	10	Joseph Kamwendo
MF	13	Hellings Mwakasungula
MF	19	Davi Banda		(substituted off) 51'
FW	9	Russell Mwafulirwa		(substituted off) 64'
FW	11	Essau Kanyenda
FW	18	Peter Wadabwa		(substituted off) 83'
Substitutions:
MF	15	Robert Ng'ambi		(substituted in) 51'
FW	4	Chiukepo Msowoya		(substituted in) 64'
FW	17	Jimmy Zakazaka		(substituted in) 83'
Manager:
Kinnah Phiri

GK	16	Faouzi Chaouchi
DF	2	Madjid Bougherra
DF	3	Nadir Belhadj
DF	5	Rafik Halliche
DF	17	Samir Zaoui
MF	6	Yazid Mansouri
MF	13	Karim Matmour		(substituted off) 62'
MF	15	Karim Ziani	(yellow card) 83'
MF	19	Hassan Yebda
FW	9	Abdelkader Ghezzal		(substituted off) 79'
FW	10	Rafik Saïfi		(substituted off) 63'
Substitutions:
MF	7	Yacine Bezzaz		(substituted in) 62'
FW	21	Abdelmalek Ziaya		(substituted in) 63'
MF	18	Hameur Bouazza		(substituted in) 79'
Manager:
Rabah Saâdane

== Mali vs Algeria ==
14 January 2010
17:00

Mali	0–1	Algeria
	Report	Halliche 43'

Estádio 11 de Novembro, Luanda
Attendance: 4,000
Referee: Muhmed Ssegonga (Uganda)

GK	16	Soumbeïla Diakité
DF	2	Ousmane Berthé
DF	3	Adama Tamboura
DF	23	Abdoulaye Maïga
DF	13	Bakary Soumaré	(yellow card) 42'
MF	6	Mahamadou Diarra	(yellow card) 59'
MF	18	Mohamed Sissoko		(substituted off) 66'
MF	12	Seydou Keita
FW	7	Tenema N'Diaye	(yellow card) 35'	(substituted off) 61'
FW	10	Modibo Maïga
FW	21	Mustapha Yatabaré		(substituted off) 59'
Substitutions:
FW	8	Mamadou Diallo		(substituted in) 59'
FW	19	Frédéric Kanouté		(substituted in) 61'
MF	20	Lassana Fané		(substituted in) 66'
Manager:
(Nigeria) Stephen Keshi

GK	16	Faouzi Chaouchi
DF	2	Madjid Bougherra
DF	3	Nadir Belhadj	(yellow card) 64'
DF	14	Abdelkader Laïfaoui
DF	5	Rafik Halliche
MF	6	Yazid Mansouri
MF	7	Yacine Bezzaz		(substituted off) 70'
MF	13	Karim Matmour		(substituted off) 90+2'
MF	15	Karim Ziani
MF	19	Hassan Yebda	(yellow card) 33'
FW	9	Abdelkader Ghezzal		(substituted off) 80'
Substitutions:
MF	18	Hameur Bouazza		(substituted in) 70'
FW	10	Rafik Saïfi		(substituted in) 80'
FW	21	Abdelmalek Ziaya		(substituted in) 90+2'
Manager:
Rabah Saâdane

== Angola vs Malawi ==
14 January 2010
19:30

Angola	2–0	Malawi
Flávio 49'; Manucho 55'	Report

Estádio 11 de Novembro, Luanda
Attendance: 48,500
Referee: Noumandiez Doué (Ivory Coast)

GK	13	Carlos
DF	5	Kali
DF	15	Rui Marques
DF	10	Zuela
MF	8	Xara
MF	11	Gilberto		(substituted off) 35'
MF	20	Stélvio	(yellow card) 15'
MF	21	Mabiná
FW	14	Djalma		(substituted off) 73'
FW	16	Flávio		(substituted off) 62'
FW	23	Manucho
Substitutions:
DF	2	Jamuana		(substituted in) 35'
FW	9	Mantorras		(substituted in) 62'
MF	6	David		(substituted in) 73'
Manager:
(Portugal) Manuel José

GK	1	Swadic Sanudi
DF	3	Moses Chavula	(yellow card) 75'
DF	5	James Sangala
DF	7	Peter Mponda
DF	12	Elvis Kafoteka
MF	10	Joseph Kamwendo		(substituted off) 75'
MF	13	Hellings Mwakasungula
MF	19	Davi Banda	(yellow card) 45+4'
FW	14	Victor Nyirenda		(substituted off) 46'
FW	11	Essau Kanyenda
FW	18	Peter Wadabwa		(substituted off) 56'
Substitutions:
FW	4	Chiukepo Msowoya		(substituted in) 46'
FW	17	Jimmy Zakazaka	(yellow card) 78'	(substituted in) 56'
MF	15	Robert Ng'ambi		(substituted in) 75'
Manager:
Kinnah Phiri

== Angola vs Algeria ==
18 January 2010
17:00

Angola	0–0	Algeria
	Report

Estádio 11 de Novembro, Luanda
Attendance: 40,000
Referee: Jerome Damon (South Africa)

GK	13	Carlos
DF	2	Jamuana
DF	5	Kali
DF	15	Rui Marques
DF	10	Zuela	(substituted off) 53'
MF	8	Xara
MF	11	Gilberto
MF	17	Zé Kalanga	(substituted off) 64'
MF	21	Mabiná
FW	14	Djalma
FW	23	Manucho	(substituted off) 90+1'
Substitutions:
DF	4	Dias Caires	(substituted in) 53'
MF	7	Job	(substituted in) 64'
FW	12	Johnson Macaba	(substituted in) 90+1'
Manager:
(Portugal) Manuel José

GK	16	Faouzi Chaouchi
DF	2	Madjid Bougherra
DF	3	Nadir Belhadj
DF	5	Rafik Halliche
DF	14	Abdelkader Laïfaoui	(yellow card) 40'
MF	6	Yazid Mansouri
MF	13	Karim Matmour	(yellow card) 15'	(substituted off) 89'
MF	15	Karim Ziani
MF	18	Hameur Bouazza		(substituted off) 67'
MF	19	Hassan Yebda
FW	9	Abdelkader Ghezzal
Substitutions:
MF	20	Mourad Meghni		(substituted in) 67'
MF	22	Djamel Abdoun		(substituted in) 89'
Manager:
Rabah Saâdane

== Mali vs Malawi ==
18 January 2010
17:00

Mali	3–1	Malawi
Kanouté 1'; Keita 3'; Bagayoko 85'	Report	Mwafulirwa 58'

Estádio Nacional do Chiazi, Cabinda
Attendance: 21,000
Referee: Rajindraparsad Seechurn (Mauritius)

GK	1	Mahamadou Sidibé
DF	2	Ousmane Berthé
DF	3	Adama Tamboura
DF	5	Souleymane Diamouténé
DF	23	Abdoulaye Maïga	(substituted off) 50'
MF	20	Lassana Fané
MF	17	Mahamane Traoré	(substituted off) 60'
MF	18	Mohamed Sissoko
MF	12	Seydou Keita
FW	9	Mamadou Bagayoko
FW	19	Frédéric Kanouté	(substituted off) 81'
Substitutions:
MF	4	Samba Sow	(substituted in) 50'
FW	8	Mamadou Diallo	(substituted in) 60'
FW	10	Modibo Maïga	(substituted in) 81'
Manager:
(Nigeria) Stephen Keshi

GK	1	Swadic Sanudi
DF	3	Moses Chavula
DF	5	James Sangala
DF	7	Peter Mponda	(yellow card) 40'
DF	12	Elvis Kafoteka		(substituted off) 52'
MF	10	Joseph Kamwendo
MF	13	Hellings Mwakasungula
MF	19	Davi Banda	(yellow card) 73'
FW	9	Russell Mwafulirwa
FW	11	Essau Kanyenda		(substituted off) 71'
FW	18	Peter Wadabwa		(substituted off) 48'
Substitutions:
FW	20	Atusaye Nyondo		(substituted in) 48'
FW	4	Chiukepo Msowoya		(substituted in) 52'
MF	15	Robert Ng'ambi		(substituted in) 71'
Manager:
Kinnah Phiri
