= 2012 Africa Cup of Nations qualification =

Football matches

This page details the process of the 2012 Africa Cup of Nations qualification phase. Forty-six African nations, including hosts Gabon and Equatorial Guinea, entered the competition. Gabon and Equatorial Guinea automatically qualified as host countries. The other 44 nations were drawn into eleven groups, each containing 4 teams. Togo was later added to Group K after its reinstatement.

In each group, teams played each other home and away in a round-robin format. The top team in each group qualified, as did the runner-up of Group K (which contained 5 teams) and the two best runners-up from the other groups.

== Qualified teams ==
To be determined Qualified Did not qualify Did not enter Not part of CAF

The teams qualified are:

Country	Qualified as	Date qualification was secured	Previous appearances in tournament
Gabon	Co-hosts	29 July 2007	4 (1994, 1996, 2000, 2010)
Equatorial Guinea	Co-hosts	29 July 2007	0 (debut)
Botswana	Group K Winner	26 March 2011	0 (debut)
Ivory Coast	Group H Winner	5 June 2011	18 (1965, 1968, 1970, 1974, 1980, 1984^{2}, 1986, 1988, 1990, **1992**^{1}, 1994, 1996, 1998, 2000, 2002, 2006, 2008, 2010)
Burkina Faso	Group F Winner	3 September 2011	7 (1978, 1996, 1998^{2}, 2000, 2002, 2004, 2010)
Senegal	Group E Winner	3 September 2011	11 (1965, 1968, 1986, 1990, 1992^{2}, 1994, 2000, 2002, 2004, 2006, 2008)
Ghana	Group I Winner	8 October 2011	17 (**1963**^{12}, **1965**^{1}, 1968, 1970, **1978**^{12}, 1980, **1982**^{1}, 1984, 1992, 1994, 1996, 1998, 2000^{2}, 2002, 2006, 2008^{2}, 2010)
Guinea	Group B Winner	8 October 2011	10 (1970, 1974, 1976, 1980, 1984, 1994, 1998, 2006, 2004, 2008)
Zambia	Group C Winner	8 October 2011	14 (1974, 1978, 1982, 1986, 1990, 1992, 1994, 1996, 1998, 2000, 2002, 2006, 2008, 2010)
Libya	Top Two Runner-up	8 October 2011	2 (1982^{2}, 2006)
Angola	Group J Winner	8 October 2011	5 (1996, 1998, 2006, 2008, 2010^{2})
Tunisia	Group K Runner-up	8 October 2011	14 (1962, 1963, 1965^{2}, 1978, 1982, 1994^{2}, 1996, 1998, 2000, 2002, **2004**^{12}, 2006, 2008, 2010)
Mali	Group A Winner	8 October 2011	6 (1972, 1994, 2002^{2}, 2004, 2008, 2010)
Niger	Group G Winner	8 October 2011	0 (debut)
Morocco	Group D Winner	9 October 2011	13 (1972, **1976**^{1}, 1978, 1980, 1986, 1988^{2}, 1992, 1998, 2000, 2002, 2004, 2006, 2008)
Sudan	Top Two Runner-up	9 October 2011	7 (1957^{2}, 1959, 1963, **1970**^{12}, 1972, 1976, 2008)

^{1} Bold indicates champion for that year
^{2} Italic indicates host

== Draw ==
The Confederation of African Football (CAF) conducted the draw for the 2012 Africa Cup of Nations qualifying campaign on 20 February 2010. The draw was held in Lubumbashi, Congo DR where the CAF Super Cup was held on 21 February 2010. The 11 teams in Pot 1 were selected based on their ranking after the 27th edition of the Africa Cup of Nations in Angola. The rest were ranked based on their position at the latest FIFA Ranking.

Pot 1	Pot 2	Pot 3	Pot 4
Egypt; Ghana; Nigeria; Algeria; Cameroon; Angola; Zambia; Ivory Coast; Burkina Faso; Mali; Tunisia	Morocco; Benin; Uganda; South Africa; Malawi; Mozambique; Guinea; Senegal; Gambia; Cape Verde; Congo	Rwanda; Tanzania; Sudan; Namibia; Congo DR; Kenya; Libya; Zimbabwe; Botswana; Ethiopia; Sierra Leone	Swaziland; Chad; Burundi; Madagascar; Liberia; Niger; Comoros; Mauritius; Mauritania; Central African Republic; Guinea-Bissau

Notes

- Togo was initially banned from competing in the tournament and was thus not involved in the draw, but they were later reinstated and added to Group K (see below).
- Did not enter: Djibouti, Eritrea, Lesotho, São Tomé and Príncipe, Seychelles, Somalia.

== Togolese Ban ==
Togo were banned from the 2012 and 2013 Africa Cup of Nations tournaments by CAF after they withdrew from the 2010 tournament following a deadly attack on their team bus.

Togo appealed to the Court of Arbitration for Sport, with FIFA president Sepp Blatter stepping in to mediate. The ban was subsequently lifted with immediate effect on 14 May 2010, after a meeting of the CAF Executive Committee. Togo were readmitted to the 2012 and 2013 tournaments, and (in the case of the 2012 qualifiers) added to the qualification stage.

== Tie-breaking rules ==
The order of tie-breakers used when two or more team have the equal number of points is: (article 14)

1. Number of points obtained in games between the teams concerned;
2. Goal difference in games between the teams concerned;
3. Goals scored in games between the teams concerned;
4. Away goals scored in games between the teams concerned;
5. Goal difference in all games;
6. Goals scored in all games;
7. Drawing of lots.

== Qualifying group stage ==
Legend
Group winners, Group K runner-up, and top two runners-up in all other groups qualify for the finals

=== Group A ===
Team	Pld	W	D	L	GF	GA	GD	Pts	MLI	CPV	ZIM	LBR
Mali	6	3	1	2	9	6	+3	10 (Note: Mali and Cape Verde are ranked by their head-to-head records)		3–0	1–0	2–1
Cape Verde	6	3	1	2	7	7	0	10	1–0		2–1	4–2
Zimbabwe	6	2	2	2	7	5	+2	8	2–1	0–0		3–0
Liberia	6	1	2	3	7	12	−5	5	2–2	1–0	1–1	

Legend: Blue = home team win; Yellow = draw; Red = away team win.
Notes:

Head-to-head
Team	Pld	W	D	L	GF	GA	GD	Pts
Mali	2	1	0	1	3	1	+2	3
Cape Verde	2	1	0	1	1	3	−2	3

4 September 2010
16:00 UTC−1

Cape Verde	1–0	Mali
Varela 44'	Report

Estádio da Várzea, Praia
Referee: Mohamed Benouza (Algeria)
5 September 2010
16:00 UTC±00:00

Liberia	1–1	Zimbabwe
Oliseh 75'	Report	Musona 30'

National Complex, Paynesville
Referee: Coffi Codjia (Benin)

9 October 2010
19:00 UTC±00:00

Mali	2–1	Liberia
A. Traoré 2'; Teekloh 52' (o.g.)	Report	Weeks 43'

Stade du 26 Mars, Bamako
Referee: Kokou Djaoupe (Togo)
10 October 2010
15:00 UTC+2

Zimbabwe	0–0	Cape Verde
	Report

Rufaro Stadium, Harare
Referee: Gil Sebastian Ndume (Gabon)

26 March 2011
16:00 UTC−1

Cape Verde	4–2	Liberia
Héldon Ramos 14', 45+1'; Babanco 25'; Fortes 53'	Report	Wleh 39'; Këïta 84'

Estádio da Várzea, Praia
Referee: Lemghaifry Ould Ali (Mauritania)
26 March 2011
19:00 UTC±00:00

Mali	1–0	Zimbabwe
Diabaté 22'	Report

Stade du 26 Mars, Bamako
Referee: Bakary Gassama (Gambia)

5 June 2011
15:00 UTC+2

Zimbabwe	2–1	Mali
Musona 45', 90' (pen.)	Report	M. Traoré 52'

Rufaro Stadium, Harare
5 June 2011
16:00 UTC±00:00

Liberia	1–0	Cape Verde
Doe 44'	Report

National Complex, Paynesville

3 September 2011
19:00 UTC±00:00

Mali	3–0	Cape Verde
Diabaté 27', 29'; M. Traoré 51'	Report

Stade du 26 Mars, Bamako
Referee: Badara Diatta (Senegal)
4 September 2011
15:00 UTC+2

Zimbabwe	3–0	Liberia
Katsande 16'; Karuru 45'; Billiat 85'	Report

Rufaro Stadium, Harare
Referee: Mohamed Benouza (Algeria)

8 October 2011
15:00 UTC±00:00

Liberia	2–2	Mali
Williams 2'; Wleh 90'	Report	Diabaté 16'; Kanté 87'

National Complex, Paynesville
8 October 2011
14:00 UTC−1

Cape Verde	2–1	Zimbabwe
Valdo 3' da Graça 13'	Report	Musona 68' (pen.)

Estádio da Várzea, Praia

=== Group B ===
Team	Pld	W	D	L	GF	GA	GD	Pts	GUI	NGA	ETH	MAD
Guinea	6	4	2	0	13	5	+8	14		1–0	1–0	4–1
Nigeria	6	3	2	1	12	5	+7	11	2–2		4–0	2–0
Ethiopia	6	2	1	3	8	13	−5	7	1–4	2–2		4–2
Madagascar	6	0	1	5	4	14	−10	1	1–1	0–2	0–1	

Legend: Blue = home team win; Yellow = draw; Red = away team win.
5 September 2010
15:00 UTC+3

Ethiopia	1–4	Guinea
Oukri 29'	Report	Yattara 37'; Kalabane 45'; K. Cissé 60'; Zayatte 75'

Addis Ababa Stadium, Addis Ababa
Referee: Tabani Mnkantjo (Zimbabwe)
5 September 2010
16:00 UTC+1

Nigeria	2–0	Madagascar
Martins 19'; Eneramo 45+1'	Report

U. J. Esuene Stadium, Calabar
Referee: Slim Jedidi (Tunisia)

10 October 2010
14:30 UTC+3

Madagascar	0–1	Ethiopia
	Report	Lemessa 62'

Mahamasina Municipal Stadium, Antananarivo
Referee: Ngosi Kalyoto (Malawi)
10 October 2010
16:30 UTC±00:00

Guinea	1–0	Nigeria
Constant 8'	Report

Stade du 28 Septembre, Conakry
Referee: Elahrach Bouchaib (Morocco)

27 March 2011
14:30 UTC+3

Madagascar	1–1	Guinea
Rajoarimanana 17'	Report	Bah 80'

Mahamasina Municipal Stadium, Antananarivo
27 March 2011
19:00 UTC+1

Nigeria	4–0	Ethiopia
Utaka 1', 53'; I. Uche 78', 90'	Report

Moshood Abiola National Stadium, Abuja
Referee: Selim Jedidi (Tunisia)

5 June 2011
16:00 UTC+3

Ethiopia	2–2	Nigeria
Said 45', 50'	Report	K. Uche 27'; Yobo 86'

Addis Ababa Stadium, Addis Ababa
5 June 2011
16:30 UTC±00:00

Guinea	4–1	Madagascar
Kalabane 6'; Bangoura 17'; S. Diallo 60'; Baldé 62'	Report	Arsène 24'

Stade du 28 Septembre, Conakry

4 September 2011
14:30 UTC+3

Madagascar	0–2	Nigeria
	Report	Yobo 68'; Obinna 75'

Mahamasina Municipal Stadium, Antananarivo
Referee: Sylvester Kirwa (Kenya)
4 September 2011
16:30 UTC±00:00

Guinea	1–0	Ethiopia
Baldé 32'	Report

Stade du 28 Septembre, Conakry
Referee: Kacem Bennaceur (Tunisia)

8 October 2011
16:00 UTC+3

Ethiopia	4–2	Madagascar
Oukri 31'; Girma 56'; Lemessa 59'; Bekele 73'	Report	Razafimandimby 3'; Rakotonomenjanahary 57'

Addis Ababa Stadium, Addis Ababa
8 October 2011
14:00 UTC+1

Nigeria	2–2	Guinea
Obinna 73'; I. Uche 84'	Report	Ismaël Bangoura 63'; Traoré 90'

Moshood Abiola National Stadium, Abuja

=== Group C ===
Team	Pld	W	D	L	GF	GA	GD	Pts	ZAM	LBY	MOZ	COM
Zambia	6	4	1	1	11	2	+9	13		0–0	3–0	4–0
Libya	6	3	3	0	6	1	+5	12	1–0		1–0	3–0
Mozambique	6	2	1	3	4	6	−2	7	0–2	0–0		3–0
Comoros	6	0	1	5	2	14	−12	1	1–2	1–1	0–1	

Legend: Blue = home team win; Yellow = draw; Red = away team win.
5 September 2010^{1}
15:00 UTC+2

Zambia	4–0	Comoros
Kalaba 6'; Tembo 22'; Chamanga 29'; Mayuka 83'	Report

Konkola Stadium, Chililabombwe
Referee: Amanuel Eyob Russom (Eritrea)
5 September 2010
15:00 UTC+2

Mozambique	0–0	Libya
	Report

Estádio da Machava, Maputo
Referee: Aboubabar Bangoura (Guinea)

9 October 2010
15:00 UTC+3

Comoros	0–1	Mozambique
	Report	Josemar 90+1'

Stade Said Mohamed Cheikh, Mitsamiouli
Referee: Ibada Ramadhan Kibo (Tanzania)
10 October 2010
20:00 UTC+2

Libya	1–0	Zambia
Sa'ad 36'	Report

June 11 Stadium, Tripoli
Referee: Gassama Papa (Gambia)

27 March 2011
15:00 UTC+2

Mozambique	0–2	Zambia
	Report	Chamanga 18'; Mayuka 90'

Estádio da Machava, Maputo
28 March 2011
18:00 UTC±00:00

Libya	3–0	Comoros
El Khatroushi 20'; Abdelkader 68'; Bindi 81'	Report

Stade du 26 Mars, Bamako (Mali)^{2}

4 June 2011
15:00 UTC+2

Zambia	3–0	Mozambique
C. Katongo 47', 67'; Mbesuma 68'	Report

Nkoloma Stadium, Lusaka
5 June 2011
15:00 UTC+3

Comoros	1–1	Libya
Mzé Mbaba 83'	Report	Boussefi 43'

Stade Said Mohamed Cheikh, Mitsamiouli

3 September 2011
18:00 UTC+2

Libya	1–0	Mozambique
Allafi 31'	Report

Petro Sport Stadium, Cairo (Egypt)^{2}
Referee: Fahim Omar (Egypt)
4 September 2011
15:00 UTC+3

Comoros	1–2	Zambia
Y. M'Changama 32'	Report	C. Katongo 23'; Mayuka 87'

Stade Said Mohamed Cheikh, Mitsamiouli

8 October 2011
15:00 UTC+2

Zambia	0–0	Libya
	Report

Nchanga Stadium, Chingola
8 October 2011
15:00 UTC+2

Mozambique	3–0	Comoros
Maninho 6'; Dário 18' (pen.); Domingues 40'	Report

Estádio da Machava, Maputo

Notes

- Note 1: Postponed from 4 September 2010, due to the late arrival of match officials.
- Note 2: Originally to be played at Tripoli, Libya but moved to neutral venue due to the political situation in Libya.

=== Group D ===
Team	Pld	W	D	L	GF	GA	GD	Pts	MAR	CTA	ALG	TAN
Morocco	6	3	2	1	8	2	+6	11		0–0	4–0	3–1
Central African Republic	6	2	2	2	5	5	0	8 (Note: Central African Republic and Algeria could not be separated by head-to-head record, so instead ranking was based on overall goal difference.)	0–0		2–0	2–1
Algeria	6	2	2	2	5	8	−3	8	1–0	2–0		1–1
Tanzania	6	1	2	3	6	9	−3	5	0–1	2–1	1–1	

Legend: Blue = home team win; Yellow = draw; Red = away team win.
Notes:
- Note: The ranking of the Central African Republic and Algeria by their head-to-head records is shown below. As they could not be separated on these criteria, ranking was based on overall goal difference.

head-to-head
Pos	Team	Pld	W	D	L	GF	GA	GD	AG	Pts
1	Central African Republic	2	1	0	1	2	2	0	0	3
2	Algeria	2	1	0	1	2	2	0	0	3

3 September 2010
22:00 UTC+1

Algeria	1–1	Tanzania
Guedioura 45'	Report	Tegete 33'

Mustapha Tchaker Stadium, Blida
Attendance: 30,000
Referee: Kokou Djaoupe (Togo)
4 September 2010
21:00 UTC±00:00

Morocco	0–0	Central African Republic
	Report

Prince Moulay Abdellah Stadium, Rabat
Referee: Koman Coulibaly (Mali)

9 October 2010
16:00 UTC+3

Tanzania	0–1	Morocco
	Report	El Hamdaoui 43'

Benjamin Mkapa National Stadium, Dar es Salaam
Referee: Seechurn Rajindraparsad (Mauritius)
10 October 2010
15:00 UTC+1

Central African Republic	2–0	Algeria
Dopékoulouyen 81'; Momi 85'	Report

Barthélemy Boganda Stadium, Bangui
Referee: Hélder Martins De Carvalho (Angola)

26 March 2011
16:00 UTC+3

Tanzania	2–1	Central African Republic
Nditi 70'; Samatta 90'	Report	Mabidé 2'

Benjamin Mkapa National Stadium, Dar es Salaam
27 March 2011
20:30 UTC+1

Algeria	1–0	Morocco
Yebda 5' (pen.)	Report

19 May Stadium, Annaba
Referee: Seechurn Rajindraparsad (Mauritius)

4 June 2011
21:00 UTC+1

Morocco	4–0	Algeria
Benatia 25'; Chamakh 38'; Hadji 60'; Assaidi 68'	Report

Stade de Marrakech, Marrakesh
Referee: Noumandiez Doué (Ivory Coast)
5 June 2011
15:00 UTC+1

Central African Republic	2–1	Tanzania
Momi 38'; Dopékoulouyen 88'	Report	Nditi 76'

Barthélemy Boganda Stadium, Bangui
Referee: Joseph Lamptey (Ghana)

3 September 2011
16:00 UTC+3

Tanzania	1–1	Algeria
Samatta 22'	Report	Bouazza 52'

Benjamin Mkapa National Stadium, Dar es Salaam
Referee: Ali Lenghaifry (Mauritania)
4 September 2011
15:00 UTC+1

Central African Republic	0–0	Morocco
	Report

Barthélemy Boganda Stadium, Bangui
Referee: Selim Jedidi (Tunisia)

9 October 2011
19:30 UTC±00:00

Morocco	3–1	Tanzania
Chamakh 20'; Taarabt 69'; Boussoufa 90'	Report	Kassim 40'

Stade de Marrakech, Marrakesh
9 October 2011
20:30 UTC+1

Algeria	2–0	Central African Republic
Yebda 1'; Kadir 28'	Report

Stade du 5 Juillet, Algiers

=== Group E ===
Team	Pld	W	D	L	GF	GA	GD	Pts	SEN	CMR	COD	MRI
Senegal	6	5	1	0	16	2	+14	16		1–0	2–0	7–0
Cameroon	6	3	2	1	12	5	+7	11	0–0		1–1	5–0
DR Congo	6	2	1	3	10	11	−1	7	2–4	2–3		3–0
Mauritius	6	0	0	6	2	22	−20	0	0–2	1–3	1–2	

Legend: Blue = home team win; Yellow = draw; Red = away team win.
4 September 2010
15:45 UTC+4

Mauritius	1–3	Cameroon
Bru 45+1' (pen.)	Report	Eto'o 39', 47'; Choupo-Moting 63' (pen.)

Anjalay Stadium, Belle Vue
Attendance: 6,000
Referee: Jerome Damon (South Africa)
5 September 2010
15:00 UTC+1

DR Congo	2–4	Senegal
Kabangu 42', 71'	Report	Sow 6'; Niang 12', 22', 57' (pen.)

Stade Frederic Kibassa Maliba, Lubumbashi
Attendance: 35,000
Referee: Djamel Hamoudi (Algeria)

9 October 2010
15:30 UTC+1

Cameroon	1–1	DR Congo
Nkulukutu 54' (o.g.)	Report	Diba Ilunga 37'

Roumdé Adjia Stadium, Garoua
Attendance: 22,000
Referee: Eddy Maillet (Seychelles)
9 October 2010
18:30 UTC±00:00

Senegal	7–0	Mauritius
Cissé 8', 38', 76'; Niang 22', 62'; Sow 47'; Estazie 90' (o.g.)	Report

Stade Léopold Sédar Senghor, Dakar
Attendance: 50,000
Referee: Daniel Bennett (South Africa)

26 March 2011
18:00 UTC±00:00

Senegal	1–0	Cameroon
Ba 90+2'	Report

Stade Léopold Sédar Senghor, Dakar
Referee: Yosr Saadalah (Tunisia)
27 March 2011
15:30 UTC+1

DR Congo	3–0	Mauritius
LuaLua 28' (pen.); Matumona 48'; Diba Ilunga 61' (pen.)	Report

Stade des Martyrs, Kinshasa
Referee: Wokoma Solomon (Nigeria)

4 June 2011
15:30 UTC+1

Cameroon	0–0	Senegal
	Report

Ahmadou Ahidjo Stadium, Yaoundé
5 June 2011
15:00 UTC+4

Mauritius	1–2	DR Congo
Bru 11' (pen.)	Report	Diba Ilunga 20'; Kabangu 45+1'

Anjalay Stadium, Belle Vue
Attendance: 6,000
Referee: Ngosi Kalyoto (Malawi)

3 September 2011
15:00 UTC+1

Cameroon	5–0	Mauritius
Kweuke 54'; Mbuta 65'; Eto'o 70' (pen.); N'Guémo 85'; Choupo-Moting 90+3'	Report

Ahmadou Ahidjo Stadium, Yaoundé
Referee: Aboubacar Bangoura (Guinea)
3 September 2011
19:00 UTC±00:00

Senegal	2–0	DR Congo
Sow 34', 50'	Report

Stade Léopold Sédar Senghor, Dakar
Referee: Noumandiez Doué (Ivory Coast)

7 October 2011
15:30 UTC+1

DR Congo	2–3	Cameroon
Kaluyituka 11'; Kanda 40'	Report	Eto'o 18'; Mbuta 75'; Choupo-Moting 79'

Stade des Martyrs, Kinshasa
9 October 2011
17:00 UTC+4

Mauritius	0–2	Senegal
	Report	N'Doye 9'; Cissé 25'

Anjalay Stadium, Belle Vue

=== Group F ===
Team	Pld	W	D	L	GF	GA	GD	Pts	BFA	GAM	NAM	MTN
Burkina Faso	4	3	1	0	12	3	+9	10		3–1	4–0	
Gambia	4	1	1	2	5	6	−1	4	1–1		3–1	
Namibia	4	1	0	3	3	11	−8	3	1–4	1–0		
Mauritania	0	0	0	0	0	0	0	0				

Legend: Blue = home team win; Yellow = draw; Red = away team win.
- Mauritania withdrew from 2012 Africa Cup of Nations qualification before any match was played.
4 September 2010
16:00 UTC±00:00

Gambia	3–1	Namibia
Nyassi 10'; Ceesay 13'; Jallow 44'	Report	Risser 89'

Independence Stadium, Bakau
Referee: Mohamed Ragab Omar (Libya)

9 October 2010
18:00 UTC±00:00

Burkina Faso	3–1	Gambia
Dagano 17'; Balima 58'; Kaboré 68'	Report	Ceesay 75'

Stade du 4 Août, Ouagadougou
Referee: Samir Osman (Egypt)

26 March 2011
18:00 UTC±00:00

Burkina Faso	4–0	Namibia
A. Traoré 26', 47', 79'; Gariseb 73' (o.g.)	Report

Stade du 4 Août, Ouagadougou
Referee: Adam Cordier (Chad)

4 June 2011
15:00 UTC+1

Namibia	1–4	Burkina Faso
Shipahu 85'	Report	A. R. Traoré 12'; Bancé 57' (pen.); A. Traoré 80' (pen.); Pitroipa 90'

Independence Stadium, Windhoek

3 September 2011
15:00 UTC+1

Namibia	1–0	Gambia
Shipahu 83'	Report

Independence Stadium, Windhoek

8 October 2011
16:30 UTC±00:00

Gambia	1–1	Burkina Faso
Danso 59'	Report	Dagano 90'

Independence Stadium, Bakau

Notes

- The Namibia Football Association made a formal complaint that Burkina Faso fielded an ineligible player, Yaoundé-born Herve Xavier Zengue, in the games on 26 March and 4 June. Burkina Faso coach Paulo Duarte says that the player is eligible as he has a Burkinabé wife. CAF opened an investigation, but later dismissed the protest saying it was filed long after the stipulated period for such appeals.
- Namibia indicated that they would appeal the decision to CAF and, if necessary, to the Court of Arbitration for Sport on two different points. Firstly that an appeal had been filed with the match referee prior to their game with Burkina Faso but had not been forwarded to CAF and secondly that such an appeal was in any case not required due to article 36.12 of the competition regulations which stated that "non-qualified or a suspended player to take part in group matches shall lose the match by penalty (3–0), even in the absence of protests/reservations".
- On 10 January 2012, their appeal was dismissed by the Court of Arbitration for Sport.

=== Group G ===
Team	Pld	W	D	L	GF	GA	GD	Pts	NIG	RSA	SLE	EGY
Niger	6	3	0	3	6	8	−2	9 (Note: Niger, South Africa and Sierra Leone are ranked by their head-to-head records.)		2–1	3–1	1–0
South Africa	6	2	3	1	4	2	+2	9	2–0		0–0	1–0
Sierra Leone	6	2	3	1	5	5	0	9	1–0	0–0		2–1
Egypt	6	1	2	3	5	5	0	5	3–0	0–0	1–1	

Legend: Blue = home team win; Yellow = draw; Red = away team win.
Notes:

head-to-head
Team	Pld	W	D	L	GF	GA	GD	Pts
Niger	4	2	0	2	5	5	0	6
South Africa	4	1	2	1	3	2	+1	5
Sierra Leone	4	1	2	1	2	3	−1	5

4 September 2010
20:30 UTC+2

South Africa	2–0	Niger
Mphela 12'; Parker 45+3'	Report

Mbombela Stadium, Nelspruit
Attendance: 40,000
Referee: Khalid Abdel Rahman (Sudan)
5 September 2010
21:30 UTC+2

Egypt	1–1	Sierra Leone
Fathalla 61'	Report	Mustapha Bangura 57'

Cairo International Stadium, Cairo
Referee: Badara Diatta (Senegal)

10 October 2010
15:30 UTC+1

Niger	1–0	Egypt
Maâzou 34'	Report

Stade Général Seyni Kountché, Niamey
Attendance: 35,000
Referee: Noumandiez Doué (Ivory Coast)
10 October 2010
16:30 UTC±00:00

Sierra Leone	0–0	South Africa
	Report

National Stadium, Freetown
Attendance: 40,000
Referee: Ali Lemghaifry (Mauritania)

26 March 2011
20:05 UTC+2

South Africa	1–0	Egypt
Mphela 90+3'	Report

Ellis Park, Johannesburg
Attendance: 55,000
Referee: Koman Coulibaly (Mali)
27 March 2011
16:00 UTC+1

Niger	3–1	Sierra Leone
Issoufou 64'; Sidibé 79'; Daouda 89'	Report	Mohamed Bangura 23'

Stade Général Seyni Kountché, Niamey

4 June 2011
16:30 UTC±00:00

Sierra Leone	1–0	Niger
T. Bangura 50'	Report

National Stadium, Freetown
5 June 2011
20:30 UTC+2

Egypt	0–0	South Africa
	Report

Cairo Military Academy Stadium, Cairo

3 September 2011
16:30 UTC±00:00

Sierra Leone	2–1	Egypt
Mohamed Elneny 14' (o.g.); Mohamed Bangura 89' (pen.)	Report	Mohsen 45+1'

National Stadium, Freetown
4 September 2011
15:30 UTC+1

Niger	2–1	South Africa
Koffi 10'; Maazou 47'	Report	Jali 70'

Stade Général Seyni Kountché, Niamey
Referee: Djamel Haimoudi (Algeria)

8 October 2011
17:00 UTC+2

Egypt	3–0	Niger
Mohsen 48', 71'; Salah 66'	Report

Cairo International Stadium, Cairo
8 October 2011
17:00 UTC+2

South Africa	0–0	Sierra Leone
	Report

Mbombela Stadium, Nelspruit

Notes

- The South African Football Association lodged a complaint against their elimination, claiming that goal difference should be used to decide on the group winner, as it is "the traditional way of determining a log standing". The South African team had believed they had qualified when the final whistle was blown following their 0–0 draw with Sierra Leone. The SAFA later withdrew its appeal.

=== Group H ===
Team	Pld	W	D	L	GF	GA	GD	Pts	CIV	RWA	BDI	BEN
Ivory Coast	6	6	0	0	19	4	+15	18		3–0	2–1	2–1
Rwanda	6	2	0	4	5	15	−10	6	0–5		3–1	0–3
Burundi	6	1	2	3	7	9	−2	5 (Note: Burundi and Benin could not be separated by head-to-head record, so instead ranking was based on overall goal difference.)	0–1	3–1		1–1
Benin	6	1	2	3	8	11	−3	5	2–6	0–1	1–1	

Legend: Blue = home team win; Yellow = draw; Red = away team win.
Notes:
- Note: The ranking of Burundi and Benin by their head-to-head records is shown below. As they could not be separated on these criteria, ranking was based on overall goal difference.

head-to-head
Team	Pld	W	D	L	GF	GA	GD	AG	Pts
Burundi	2	0	2	0	2	2	0	1	2
Benin	2	0	2	0	2	2	0	1	2

4 September 2010
16:00 UTC±00:00

Ivory Coast	3–0	Rwanda
Y. Touré 11'; Kalou 19'; Eboué 40'	Report

Stade Félix Houphouët-Boigny, Abidjan
Referee: Eddy Maillet (Seychelles)
5 September 2010
16:00 UTC+1

Benin	1–1	Burundi
Poté 6'	Report	Kayumbagu 86'

Stade de l'Amitié, Cotonou
Referee: Daniel Bennett (South Africa)

9 October 2010
15:30 UTC+2

Burundi	0–1	Ivory Coast
	Report	Romaric 33'

Prince Louis Rwagasore Stadium, Bujumbura
Referee: El Raay Adel (Libya)
9 October 2010
15:30 UTC+2

Rwanda	0–3	Benin
	Report	Tchomogo 50'; Omotoyossi 60'; Sessègnon 70'

Amahoro Stadium, Kigali
Referee: Haimoudi Djamel (Algeria)

26 March 2011
15:00 UTC+2

Rwanda	3–1	Burundi
Iranzi 34'; Uzamukunda 45' (pen.); Gasana 88'	Report	Papy 36'

Amahoro Stadium, Kigali
27 March 2011
17:30 UTC±00:00

Ivory Coast	2–1	Benin
Drogba 45', 76'	Report	Tchomogo 14'

Ohene Djan Stadium, Accra (Ghana)^{3}

5 June 2011
15:30 UTC+2

Burundi	3–1	Rwanda
Ndikumana 29'; Ntibazonkiza 53'; Kayumbagu 84'	Report	Bokota 48'

Prince Louis Rwagasore Stadium, Bujumbura
5 June 2011
14:30 UTC+1

Benin	2–6	Ivory Coast
Sessègnon 56', 61' (pen.)	Report	Ya Konan 13'; Drogba 22', 75'; Gervinho 31', 81'; Bony 90'

Stade de l'Amitié, Cotonou

3 September 2011
15:30 UTC+2

Rwanda	0–5	Ivory Coast
	Report	Kalou 29'; Bony 36', 45'; Ya Konan 76'; Gervinho 81'

Amahoro Stadium, Kigali
Referee: Gehad Gresha (Egypt)
4 September 2011
15:30 UTC+2

Burundi	1–1	Benin
Papy 90'	Report	Akpagba 55'

Prince Louis Rwagasore Stadium, Bujumbura
Referee: Khalid Abdel Rahman (Sudan)

9 October 2011
15:00 UTC+1

Benin	0–1	Rwanda
	Report	Kagere 6'

Stade de l'Amitié, Cotonou
9 October 2011
14:00 UTC±00:00

Ivory Coast	2–1	Burundi
K. Touré 77'; Y. Touré 90'	Report	Ndabashinze 85'

Stade Félix Houphouët-Boigny, Abidjan

Notes

- Note 3: Originally to be played at Abidjan, Ivory Coast but moved to neutral venue due to the political situation in Côte d'Ivoire.

=== Group I ===
Team	Pld	W	D	L	GF	GA	GD	Pts	GHA	SUD	CGO	SWZ
Ghana	6	5	1	0	13	1	+12	16		0–0	3–1	2–0
Sudan	6	4	1	1	8	3	+5	13	0–2		2–0	3–0
Congo	6	2	0	4	5	10	−5	6	0–3	0–1		3–1
Swaziland	6	0	0	6	2	14	−12	0	0–3	1–2	0–1	

Legend: Blue = home team win; Yellow = draw; Red = away team win.
4 September 2010
22:30 UTC+3

Sudan	2–0	Congo
Mudather Karika 9'; Muhannad El Tahir 90' (pen.)	Report

Khartoum Stadium, Khartoum
Referee: Wellington Kaoma (Zambia)
5 September 2010
15:00 UTC+2

Swaziland	0–3	Ghana
	Report	A. Ayew 13'; Tagoe 70'; Sarpei 81'

Somhlolo National Stadium, Lobamba
Referee: Rajindraparsad Seechurn (Mauritius)

10 October 2010
15:30 UTC+1

Congo	3–1	Swaziland
Mouko 20' (pen.); Sembolo 34', 73'	Report	Christie 36'

Stade de la Revolution, Brazzaville
Referee: Ssegonga Muhmed (Uganda)
10 October 2010
17:00 UTC±00:00

Ghana	0–0	Sudan
	Report

Baba Yara Stadium, Kumasi
Attendance: 39,000
Referee: Jerome Damon (South Africa)

27 March 2011
15:30 UTC+1

Congo	0–3	Ghana
	Report	Tagoe 5'; Adiyiah 26'; Muntari 68'

Stade de la Revolution, Brazzaville
27 March 2011
20:00 UTC+3

Sudan	3–0	Swaziland
Bisha 2', 63'; Muhannad El Tahir 90'	Report

Al-Merrikh Stadium, Omdurman

3 June 2011
17:00 UTC±00:00

Ghana	3–1	Congo
Vorsah 62'; Tagoe 66'; Agyemang-Badu 78'	Report	N'Guessi 75'

Baba Yara Stadium, Kumasi
5 June 2011
15:00 UTC+2

Swaziland	1–2	Sudan
Kunene 69'	Report	Galag 70'; Yousif 84'

Somhlolo National Stadium, Lobamba

2 September 2011
18:00 UTC±00:00

Ghana	2–0	Swaziland
Gyan 9'; Agyemang-Badu 80'	Report

Ohene Djan Stadium, Accra
4 September 2011
15:30 UTC+1

Congo	0–1	Sudan
	Report	Ramadan 77'

Stade de la Revolution, Brazzaville
Referee: Rajindraparsad Seechurn (Mauritius)

8 October 2011
15:00 UTC+2

Swaziland	0–1	Congo
	Report	Nkolo 47'

Somhlolo National Stadium, Lobamba
8 October 2011
16:00 UTC+3

Sudan	0–2	Ghana
	Report	Gyan 10'; John Mensah 22'

Khartoum Stadium, Khartoum

=== Group J ===
Team	Pld	W	D	L	GF	GA	GD	Pts	ANG	UGA	KEN	GNB
Angola	6	4	0	2	7	5	+2	12		2–0	1–0	1–0
Uganda	6	3	2	1	6	2	+4	11	3–0		0–0	2–0
Kenya	6	2	2	2	4	4	0	8	2–1	0–0		2–1
Guinea-Bissau	6	1	0	5	2	8	−6	3	0–2	0–1	1–0	

Legend: Blue = home team win; Yellow = draw; Red = away team win.
4 September 2010
16:00 UTC+3

Uganda	3–0	Angola
Obua 35'; Mwesigwa 58'; Sserunkuma 88'	Report

Mandela National Stadium, Kampala
Referee: Samir Mahmoud Osman (Egypt)
4 September 2010
16:00 UTC±00:00

Guinea-Bissau	1–0	Kenya
Dionísio 76'	Report

Estádio 24 de Setembro, Bissau
Referee: Kacem Bennaceur (Tunisia)

9 October 2010
16:00 UTC+3

Kenya	0–0	Uganda
	Report

Kasarani Stadium, Nairobi
Referee: Diata Badara (Senegal)
9 October 2010
16:00 UTC+1

Angola	1–0	Guinea-Bissau
Gilberto 22' (pen.)	Report

Estádio 11 de Novembro, Luanda
Referee: Koman Coulibaly (Mali)

26 March 2011
16:00 UTC+3

Kenya	2–1	Angola
Mohammed 57'; Mariga 90+1'	Report	Manucho 19'

Kasarani Stadium, Nairobi
26 March 2011
16:30 UTC±00:00

Guinea-Bissau	0–1	Uganda
	Report	Obua 22'

Estádio 24 de Setembro, Bissau

4 June 2011
16:00 UTC+3

Uganda	2–0	Guinea-Bissau
Walusimbi 43'; Massa 62'	Report

Mandela National Stadium, Kampala
5 June 2011
15:30 UTC+1

Angola	1–0	Kenya
Manucho 71'	Report

Estádio 11 de Novembro, Luanda

3 September 2011
16:00 UTC+3

Kenya	2–1	Guinea-Bissau
Baraza 58'; Oliech 90'	Report	De Carvalho 86'

Kasarani Stadium, Nairobi
4 September 2011
16:00 UTC+1

Angola	2–0	Uganda
Manucho 57'; Flávio 70'	Report

Estádio 11 de Novembro, Luanda
Referee: Elahrach Bouchaib (Morocco)

8 October 2011
17:00 UTC+3

Uganda	0–0	Kenya
	Report

Mandela National Stadium, Kampala
8 October 2011
14:00 UTC±00:00

Guinea-Bissau	0–2	Angola
	Report	Manucho 8'; Mateus 70'

Estádio 24 de Setembro, Bissau

=== Group K ===
Team	Pld	W	D	L	GF	GA	GD	Pts	BOT	TUN	MWI	TOG	CHA
Botswana	8	5	2	1	7	3	+4	17		1–0	0–0	2–1	1–0
Tunisia	8	4	2	2	14	6	+8	14	0–1		2–2	2–0	5–0
Malawi	8	2	6	0	13	8	+5	12	1–1	0–0		1–0	6–2
Togo	8	1	3	4	6	10	−4	6	1–0	1–2	1–1		0–0
Chad	8	0	3	5	7	20	−13	3	0–1	1–3	2–2	2–2	

Legend: Blue = home team win; Yellow = draw; Red = away team win.
1 July 2010
17:00 UTC+1

Chad	2–2	Togo
Djime 20'; Mbaiam 28'	Report	Mani 25'; Aloenouvo 67'

Stade National, N'Djamena
Referee: Mohamed Benouza (Algeria)
1 July 2010
19:15 UTC+1

Tunisia	0–1	Botswana
	Report	Ramatlhakwane 31'

Stade El Menzah, Tunis
Referee: Badara Diatta (Senegal)

9 July 2010
11:00 UTC±00:00

Togo	1–1	Malawi
Aloenouvo 85'	Report	Mwakasungula 17'

Stade de Kégué, Lomé
Referee: Daniel Bennett (South Africa)
9 July 2010
15:00 UTC+2

Botswana	1–0	Chad
Mongala 50'	Report

Botswana National Stadium, Gaborone
Referee: Rajindraparsad Seechurn (Mauritius)

11 August 2010
15:00 UTC+1

Chad	1–3	Tunisia
Ndouassel 75'	Report	Korbi 9'; Ben Khalfallah 43', 81'

Stade National, N'Djamena
Referee: Normandiez Doue (Ivory Coast)
11 August 2010
16:00 UTC+2

Malawi	1–1	Botswana
Banda 74'	Report	Ramatlhakwane 63'

Kamuzu Stadium, Blantyre
Referee: Hélder Martins de Carvalho (Angola)

4 September 2010
15:00 UTC+2

Botswana	2–1	Togo
Mogorosi 8'; Ramatlhakwane 56'	Report	Gakpé 49'

University of Botswana Stadium, Gaborone
Referee: Issa Kagaso (Rwanda)
4 September 2010
21:30 UTC+1

Tunisia	2–2	Malawi
Jemâa 11', 27'	Report	Msowoya 45'; Kanyenda 82' (pen.)

Stade Olympique Hammadi Agrebi, Tunis
Referee: Joseph Lamptey (Ghana)

9 October 2010
14:30 UTC+2

Malawi	6–2	Chad
Zakazaka 14'; Kanyenda 21', 56'; Msowoya 68', 72'; Ng'ambi 80'	Report	Mbaiam 27'; Ndouassel 76'

Kamuzu Stadium, Blantyre
Referee: Sylvester Kirwa (Kenya)
10 October 2010
15:30 UTC±00:00

Togo	1–2	Tunisia
Mani 40'	Report	Jemâa 38'; Chermiti 83'

Stade de Kégué, Lomé
Referee: Khalid Abdel Rahman (Sudan)

17 November 2010
16:00 UTC+2

Botswana	1–0	Tunisia
Ramatlhakwane 45'	Report

University of Botswana Stadium, Gaborone
Referee: Wellington Kaoma (Zambia)
17 November 2010
15:00 UTC±00:00

Togo	0–0	Chad
	Report

Stade de Kégué, Lomé
Referee: Koman Coulibaly (Mali)

26 March 2011
14:30 UTC+2

Malawi	1–0	Togo
Kanyenda 18'	Report

Kamuzu Stadium, Blantyre
26 March 2011
16:00 UTC+1

Chad	0–1	Botswana
	Report	Ramatlhkwane 50'

Stade National, N'Djamena

5 June 2011
15:00 UTC+2

Botswana	0–0	Malawi
	Report

University of Botswana Stadium, Gaborone
5 June 2011
18:00 UTC+1

Tunisia	5–0	Chad
Jemâa 22', 44', 53'; Abdennour 35'; Darragi 47'	Report

Stade Olympique de Sousse, Sousse

3 September 2011
14:30 UTC+2

Malawi	0–0	Tunisia
	Report

Kamuzu Stadium, Blantyre
Attendance: 40,000
4 September 2011
15:30 UTC±00:00

Togo	1–0	Botswana
Arimiyao 24'	Report

Stade de Kégué, Lomé
Referee: Noumandiez Doué (Ivory Coast)

8 October 2011
16:00 UTC+1

Chad	2–2	Malawi
Labbo 64'; Barthelemy 90+4'	Report	Ng'ambi 35'; Nyirenda 81'

Stade National, N'Djamena
8 October 2011
16:00 UTC+1

Tunisia	2–0	Togo
Hichri 19'; Khelifa 79'	Report

Olympic Stadium, Tunis

=== Ranking of group runners-up ===
The two best runners-up from Groups A–J qualify for the 2012 ACN. After the withdrawal of Mauritania from Group F, the following rule applies:

In case a group of four is reduced to three teams during the competition, the two best runners up of the groups of four were determined by taking into account their results with the first and third of their respective groups without taking into account their results against the last team of their groups in order to allow the second of the group reduced to three teams to remain in the race for the two best second.

The two best runners-up are determined by the following parameters in this order:

1. Highest number of points
2. Goal difference
3. Highest number of goals scored
4. Match replay in case of parity

Pos	Grp	Team	Pld	W	D	L	GF	GA	GD	Pts
1	C	Libya	4	2	2	0	2	0	+2	8
2	I	Sudan	4	2	1	1	3	2	+1	7
3	A	Cape Verde	4	2	1	1	3	4	−1	7
4	B	Nigeria	4	1	2	1	8	5	+3	5
5	G	South Africa	4	1	2	1	3	2	+1	5
6	J	Uganda	4	1	2	1	3	2	+1	5
7	E	Cameroon	4	1	2	1	4	4	0	5
8	D	Central African Republic	4	1	2	1	2	2	0	5
9	F	Gambia	4	1	1	2	5	6	−1	4
10	H	Rwanda	4	1	0	3	4	12	−8	3

== Goalscorers ==
There were 327 goals scored in 130 games for an average of 2.52 goals per game.

6 goals

- (Tunisia) Issam Jemâa

5 goals

- (Botswana) Jerome Ramatlhakwane
- (Senegal) Mamadou Niang

4 goals

- (Angola) Manucho
- (Burkina Faso) Alain Traoré
- (Cameroon) Samuel Eto'o
- (Ivory Coast) Didier Drogba
- (Mali) Cheick Diabaté
- (Senegal) Papiss Cissé
- (Senegal) Moussa Sow
- (Zimbabwe) Knowledge Musona

3 goals

- (Benin) Stéphane Sessègnon
- (Cameroon) Eric Maxim Choupo-Moting
- (Democratic Republic of the Congo) Yves Diba Ilunga
- (Democratic Republic of the Congo) Patou Kabangu
- (Ivory Coast) Wilfried Bony
- (Ivory Coast) Gervinho
- (Egypt) Marwan Mohsen
- (Ghana) Prince Tagoe
- (Malawi) Essau Kanyenda
- (Malawi) Chiukepo Msowoya
- (Nigeria) Ikechukwu Uche
- (Zambia) Christopher Katongo
- (Zambia) Emmanuel Mayuka

2 goals

- (Algeria) Hassan Yebda
- (Benin) Séïdath Tchomogo
- (Burundi) Didier Kavumbagu
- (Burundi) Faty Papy
- (Burkina Faso) Moumouni Dagano
- (Cameroon) Matthew Mbuta
- (Cape Verde) Héldon
- (Central African Republic) Charlie Dopékoulouyen
- (Central African Republic) Hilaire Momi
- (Chad) Marius Mbaiam
- (Chad) Ezechiel N'Douassel
- (Republic of the Congo) Francky Sembolo
- (Ivory Coast) Salomon Kalou
- (Ivory Coast) Didier Ya Konan
- (Ivory Coast) Yaya Touré
- (Ethiopia) Fikru Teferra
- (Ethiopia) Oumed Oukri
- (Ethiopia) Saladin Said
- (The Gambia) Momodou Ceesay
- (Ghana) Emmanuel Agyemang-Badu
- (Ghana) Asamoah Gyan
- (Guinea) Bobo Baldé
- (Guinea) Ismaël Bangoura
- (Guinea) Oumar Kalabane
- (Liberia) Patrick Wleh
- (Malawi) Robert Ng'ambi
- (Mauritius) Jonathan Bru
- (Mali) Mahamane Traoré
- (Morocco) Marouane Chamakh
- (Namibia) Tangeni Shipahu
- (Niger) Moussa Maâzou
- (Nigeria) Victor Obinna
- (Nigeria) Peter Utaka
- (Nigeria) Joseph Yobo
- (Sierra Leone) Mohamed Bangura
- (South Africa) Katlego Mphela
- (Sudan) Mohamed Bashir
- (Sudan) Muhamed Tahir
- (Tanzania) Shaban Nditi
- (Tanzania) Mbwana Samata
- (Togo) Backer Aloenouvo
- (Togo) Mani Sapol
- (Tunisia) Fahid Ben Khalfallah
- (Uganda) David Obua
- (Zambia) James Chamanga

1 goal

- (Algeria) Hamer Bouazza
- (Algeria) Adlène Guedioura
- (Algeria) Foued Kadir
- (Angola) Flávio
- (Angola) Gilberto
- (Angola) Mateus Galiano
- (Benin) Guy Akpagba
- (Benin) Razak Omotoyossi
- (Benin) Mickaël Poté
- (Botswana) Joel Mogorosi
- (Botswana) Phenyo Mongala
- (Burkina Faso) Wilfried Balima
- (Burkina Faso) Aristide Bancé
- (Burkina Faso) Charles Kaboré
- (Burkina Faso) Jonathan Pitroipa
- (Burkina Faso) Abdou Razack Traoré
- (Burundi) Dugary Ndabashinze
- (Burundi) Selemani Ndikumana
- (Burundi) Saidi Ntibazonkiza
- (Cameroon) Léonard Kweuke
- (Cameroon) Landry N'Guémo
- (Cape Verde) Elvis Macedo Babanco
- (Cape Verde) Odaïr Fortes
- (Cape Verde) Ryan Mendes da Graça
- (Cape Verde) Valdo
- (Cape Verde) Fernando Varela
- (Central African Republic) Vianney Mabidé
- (Chad) Karl Max Barthélémy
- (Chad) Léger Djimrangar
- (Chad) Mahamat Labbo
- (Comoros) Youssouf M'Changama
- (Comoros) Abdoulaide Mzé Mbaba
- (Republic of the Congo) Barel Mouko
- (Republic of the Congo) Lorry Nkolo
- (Republic of the Congo) Fabrice Ondama
- (Democratic Republic of the Congo) Dioko Kaluyituka
- (Democratic Republic of the Congo) Déo Kanda
- (Democratic Republic of the Congo) Lomana LuaLua
- (Democratic Republic of the Congo) Zola Matumona
- (Ivory Coast) Emmanuel Eboué
- (Ivory Coast) Romaric
- (Ivory Coast) Kolo Touré
- (Egypt) Mahmoud Fathalla
- (Egypt) Mohamed Salah
- (Ethiopia) Shimelis Bekele
- (Ethiopia) Adane Girma
- (The Gambia) Mamadou Danso
- (The Gambia) Ousman Jallow
- (The Gambia) Omar Jawo
- (The Gambia) Sanna Nyassi
- (Ghana) Dominic Adiyiah
- (Ghana) André Ayew
- (Ghana) John Mensah
- (Ghana) Sulley Muntari
- (Ghana) Hans Sarpei
- (Ghana) Isaac Vorsah
- (Guinea) Mamadou Bah
- (Guinea) Karamoko Cissé
- (Guinea) Kévin Constant
- (Guinea) Sadio Diallo
- (Guinea) Ibrahima Traoré
- (Guinea) Ibrahim Yattara
- (Guinea) Kamil Zayatte
- (Guinea-Bissau) Basile de Carvalho
- (Guinea-Bissau) Dionísio
- (Kenya) Mike Baraza
- (Kenya) McDonald Mariga
- (Kenya) Jamal Mohamed
- (Kenya) Dennis Oliech
- (Liberia) Francis Doe
- (Liberia) Alsény Këïta
- (Liberia) Sekou Oliseh
- (Liberia) Theo Lewis Weeks
- (Liberia) Dioh Williams
- (Libya) Ahmed Abdelkader
- (Libya) Rabee Allafi
- (Libya) Djamal Bindi
- (Libya) Ihaab Boussefi
- (Libya) Walid Mhadeb El Khatroushi
- (Libya) Ahmed Saad Osman
- (Madagascar) Faed Arsène
- (Madagascar) Yvan Rajoarimanana
- (Madagascar) Baggio Rakotonomenjanahary
- (Madagascar) Jean José Razafimandimby
- (Malawi) Davi Banda
- (Malawi) Essau Kanyenda
- (Malawi) Hellings Mwakasungula
- (Malawi) Harry Nyirenda
- (Malawi) Jimmy Zakazaka
- (Mali) Cédric Kanté
- (Mali) Abdou Traoré
- (Morocco) Oussama Assaidi
- (Morocco) Medhi Benatia
- (Morocco) Mbark Boussoufa
- (Morocco) Mounir El Hamdaoui
- (Morocco) Youssouf Hadji
- (Morocco) Adel Taarabt
- (Mozambique) Dário
- (Mozambique) Domingues
- (Mozambique) Josemar
- (Mozambique) Maninho
- (Namibia) Wilko Risser
- (Niger) Kamilou Daouda
- (Niger) Alhassane Issoufou
- (Niger) Dankwa Koffi
- (Niger) Issa Modibo Sidibé
- (Nigeria) Michael Eneramo
- (Nigeria) Obafemi Martins
- (Nigeria) Kalu Uche
- (Rwanda) Labama Bokota
- (Rwanda) Eric Gasana
- (Rwanda) Jean-Claude Iranzi
- (Rwanda) Mere Kagere
- (Rwanda) Elias Uzamukunda
- (Senegal) Demba Ba
- (Senegal) Dame N'Doye
- (Sierra Leone) Mustapha Bangura
- (Sierra Leone) Teteh Bangura
- (Sierra Leone) Sheriff Suma
- (South Africa) Andile Jali
- (South Africa) Bernard Parker
- (Sudan) Bakri Al-Madina
- (Sudan) Mudather El Tahir
- (Sudan) Galag
- (Sudan) Ala'a Eldin Yousif
- (Eswatini) Darren Christie
- (Eswatini) Manqoba Kunene
- (Tanzania) Abdi Kassim
- (Tanzania) Jerson Tegete
- (Togo) Kondo Arimiyaou
- (Togo) Serge Gakpé
- (Tunisia) Aymen Abdennour
- (Tunisia) Amine Chermiti
- (Tunisia) Oussama Darragi
- (Tunisia) Walid Hichri
- (Tunisia) Saber Khalifa
- (Tunisia) Khaled Korbi
- (Uganda) Geofrey Massa
- (Uganda) Andrew Mwesigwa
- (Uganda) Geoffrey Sserunkuma
- (Uganda) Godfrey Walusimbi
- (Zambia) Rainford Kalaba
- (Zambia) Collins Mbesuma
- (Zambia) Fwayo Tembo
- (Zimbabwe) Khama Billiat
- (Zimbabwe) Ovidy Karuru
- (Zimbabwe) Willard Katsande

1 own goal

- (Democratic Republic of the Congo) Eric Nkulukuta (playing against Cameroon)
- (Liberia) Ben Teekloh (playing against Mali)
- (Mauritius) Joye Estazie (playing against Senegal)
- (Namibia) Richard Gariseb (playing against Burkina Faso)
