= Gasana =

Gasana is a Rwandan surname. Notable people with the surname include:

- Alfred Gasana, Rwandan politician
- Anastase Gasana (born 1950), Rwandan political figure and diplomat
- Sammy Gasana (born 1996), AI entrepreneur
- Eric Gasana (born 1986), Rwandan footballer
- Eugène-Richard Gasana, Rwandan diplomat
- Kenny Gasana (born 1984), Rwandan basketball player
