= Ahmed Abdelkader =

Ahmed Abdelkader is the name of three footballers:

- Ahmed Abdelkader (footballer, born 1986), Libyan footballer
- Ahmed Abdelkader (footballer, born 1999), French-Algerian footballer
- Ahmed Abdel Kader (born 1999), Egyptian footballer
