= Rabee Allafi =

Libyan footballer

Rabee Allafi is a Libyan footballer, who scored the first goal for the Libya national football team in the post-Gaddafi era.

During the Libyan civil war, the national team played in a 2012 Africa Cup of Nations qualification game against Mozambique in Cairo, wearing a white kit, under a new flag and new anthem. Allafi scored the first goal for Libya which enabled Libya to beat Mozambique. Libya then qualified to the 2012 Africa Cup of Nations after a goalless draw with at Zambia.
