= Faed Arsène =

Malagasy footballer (born 1985)

Personal information
- Date of birth: 21 June 1985 (age 41)
- Place of birth: Mahajanga, Madagascar
- Height: 1.78 m (5 ft 10 in)
- Position: Striker

Senior career*
Years	Team	Apps	(Gls)
2004–2005	CS Avion	20	(4)
2005–2007	Lens B	30	(8)
2007–2009	CS Louhans-Cuiseaux	61	(10)
2009–2010	USL Dunkerque	22	(11)
2010–2011	ROCCM	27	(16)
2011–2013	Royal Mouscron-Péruwelz	30	(14)
2018–2020	AG Grenay		

International career
2010–2011	Madagascar	6	(1)
- * Club domestic league appearances and goals

Faed Arsène (born 21 June 1985) is a Malagasy former footballer who played as a striker.

== Club career ==
Arsène played club football in France and Belgium for CS Avion, Lens B, CS Louhans-Cuiseaux, USL Dunkerque, Olympic de Charleroi-Marchienne and Royal Mouscron-Péruwelz. He came out of retirement to play for AG Grenay between 2018 and 2020.

== International career ==
He made his international debut for Madagascar in 2010 and he scored against Guinea during the 4–1 loss on 5 June 2011.

== Personal life ==
His father is Hervé Arsène.

== Career statistics ==
=== International ===
Appearances and goals by national team and year
National team	Year	Apps	Goals
Madagascar	2010	2	0
Madagascar	2011	4	1
Total		6	1

Scores and results list Madagascar's goal tally first, score column indicates score after each Arsène goal.

List of international goals scored by Faed Arsène
No.	Date	Venue	Cap	Opponent	Score	Result	Competition
1.	5 June 2011	Stade du 28 Septembre, Conakry, Guinea	4	Guinea	1–2	1–4	2012 Africa Cup of Nations qualification
