= Faty Papy =

Burundian footballer (1990–2019)

- Papy with Bidvest Wits F.C.

Personal information
- Full name: Faty Papy
- Date of birth: 18 September 1990
- Place of birth: Bujumbura, Burundi
- Date of death: 25 April 2019 (aged 28)
- Place of death: Piggs Peak, Eswatini
- Height: 1.77 m (5 ft 10 in)
- Position: Midfielder

Youth career
- 2001–2006: AS Inter Star

Senior career*
Years	Team	Apps	(Gls)
2007–2008	AS Inter Star	23	(4)
2008–2011	Trabzonspor	0	(0)
2009–2010	→ MVV (loan)	17	(4)
2011–2012	APR FC		
2012–2016	Bidvest Wits	76	(9)
2018–2019	Real Kings	3	(1)
2019	Malanti Chiefs		

International career^{‡}
2008–2019	Burundi	21	(2)
- * Club domestic league appearances and goals as of 5 November 2016 ‡ National team caps and goals as of 5 November 2016

Faty Papy (18 September 1990 – 25 April 2019) was a Burundian professional footballer who played as a midfielder. He was a Burundian international.

== Career ==
Papy signed on 25 December 2008, for Trabzonspor, coming from AS Inter Star in the then-capital Bujumbura.

Sports magazine Goal.com suggested Papy as one of the 10 African Players to Watch in 2009.

On 24 June 2009, Papy was loaned out to Dutch side MVV. On 5 January 2011, Trabzonspor released the Burundian midfielder by mutual consent making him a free agent.

In 2016, Papy left South African club Bidvest Wits after four years due to heart problems. In 2018, Papy returned to football, signing for the Real Kings in the National First Division. In January 2019, Papy was released by the Real Kings due to a re-occurrence of his heart condition. Papy later signed for the Malanti Chiefs in Eswatini, making his debut for the club on 3 February 2019 in a 2–0 Ingwenyama Cup loss against the Mbabane Highlanders.

== International career ==
Papy made his international debut as a substitute in a 0–0 draw with the Seychelles on 1 June 2008.

=== International goals ===
Goal	Date	Venue	Opponent	Score	Result	Competition
1	26 March 2011	Stade Amahoro, Kigali	Rwanda	1–1	1–3	2012 Africa Cup of Nations qualification
2	4 September 2011	Stade Prince Louis Rwagasore, Bujumbura	Benin	1–1	1–1	2012 Africa Cup of Nations qualification

== Death ==
Papy collapsed and died on 25 April 2019 while playing a match for the Malanti Chiefs in Piggs Peak. His heart condition had reportedly reoccurred again.

== See also ==
- List of association footballers who died while playing
