= Darren Christie =

Swazi footballer

Personal information
- Full name: Darren Christie Melusi
- Date of birth: 21 November 1984 (age 41)
- Place of birth: Mbabane, Swaziland
- Positions: Midfielder; striker

Team information
- Current team: Mbabane Swallows

Youth career
- 2005–2006: Mbabane Swallows

College career
Years	Team	Apps	(Gls)
2006–2010	Delaware Blue Hens	55	(13)

Senior career*
Years	Team	Apps	(Gls)
2010–	Mbabane Swallows		

International career
2010–	Swaziland	3	(1)
- * Club domestic league appearances and goals

Darren Christie Melusi (born 21 November 1984) is a Liswati footballer. He plays for Mbabane Swallows in the Swazi Premier League. He is a member of Swaziland national football team, played at the 2012 Africa Cup of Nations qualification, scored one goal.
