= Guy Akpagba =

Beninese footballer

Personal information
- Date of birth: 5 May 1990 (age 36)
- Place of birth: Cotonou, Benin
- Position: Defender

Senior career*
Years	Team	Apps	(Gls)
2011–?	Dragons		

International career
2011	Benin	1	(1)
- * Club domestic league appearances and goals

Guy Akpagba (born 5 May 1990) is a Beninese former footballer who played as a defender for Benin Premier League club Dragons. He was called to Benin national team at the 2012 Africa Cup of Nations.

== International career ==
Scores and results list Benin's goal tally first.

No	Date	Venue	Opponent	Score	Result	Competition
1.	4 September 2011	Prince Louis Rwagasore Stadium, Bujumbura, Burundi	Burundi	1–0	1–1	2012 Africa Cup of Nations qualification
