= Marius Mbaiam =

Chadian footballer (born 1987)

Personal information
- Full name: Nekiambé Marius Mbaiam
- Date of birth: 1 July 1987 (age 39)
- Place of birth: Moundou, Chad
- Height: 1.73 m (5 ft 8 in)
- Positions: Striker; midfielder

Team information
- Current team: Besançon Football

Youth career
- 2001–2002: AS COTON TCHAD

Senior career*
Years	Team	Apps	(Gls)
2003–2004	AS COTON TCHAD	43	(5)
2004–2009	Grenoble	0	(0)
2007–2008	→ Louhans-Cuiseaux (loan)	9	(2)
2009–2011	Gap	67	(13)
2011–2012	Orléans	18	(1)
2012–2014	Grenoble	47	(7)
2014–2015	Jura Sud	27	(8)
2015–2016	Belfort	12	(0)
2016–2017	Saint-Louis Neuweg	22	(3)
2017–	Besançon Football	49	(13)

International career^{‡}
2003–2015	Chad	27	(3)
- * Club domestic league appearances and goals as of 1 July 2019 ‡ National team caps and goals as of 8 October 2020

Nekiambé Marius Mbaiam (born 1 June 1987) is a Chadian professional footballer who plays as a striker or midfielder in the Championnat National 3 for Besançon Football. At international level, he represented the Chad national team.

== Club career ==
Mbaiam was born in Moundou, Chad. transferred from Grenoble Foot to Louhans-Cuiseaux in June 2007. After two years and nine matches, with two scored goals, in summer 2009 he signed for Gap. From 2017, he is a member of Besançon Football.

== International career ==
Mbaiam made his international debut on 12 October 2003 and was member of the Chad national football team at 2007 CEMAC Cup. He was the part of the team for Fifa World Cup 2006 qualifiers, and Fifa World Cup 2010 qualifiers. Mbaiam scored his first goal on 6 September 2008 against Sudan national football team. He was national team captain.

== International goals ==
#	Date	Venue	Opponent	Score	Result	Competition
1	6 September 2008	Cairo	Sudan	1–0	2–1	2010 World Cup qualification
2	1 July 2010	N'Djamena	Togo	2–1	2–2	2012 Africa Cup of Nations qualification
3	9 October 2010	Blantyre	Malawi	2–5	2–6	2012 Africa Cup of Nations qualification

== See also ==
- List of Chad international footballers
