= Tangeni Shipahu =

Namibian footballer

Personal information
- Full name: Tangeni Shipahu
- Date of birth: 3 September 1987 (age 39)
- Place of birth: Swakopmund, Namibia
- Height: 1.84 m (6 ft 1/2 in)
- Position: Striker

Senior career*
Years	Team	Apps	(Gls)
2007–2010	United Africa Tigers	0	(0)
2010–2012	AmaZulu	39	(9)
2012–2015	Osotspa Samut Prakan	39	(4)
2015	→ Army United (loan)	15	(1)
2015	→ Krabi (loan)	17	(4)
2016	United Africa Tigers	6	(4)
2016–2017	Krabi	30	(8)
2017	→ JL Chiangmai United (loan)	21	(5)
2018	Deffo		

International career
2010–	Namibia	20	(2)
- * Club domestic league appearances and goals

Tangeni Shipahu (born 3 September 1987, in Swakopmund) is a Namibian football striker.

== International goals ==
#	Date	Venue	Opponent	Score	Result	Competition
1.	June 4, 2011	Windhoek, Namibia	Burkina Faso	1–4	Lose	2012 Africa Cup of Nations qualification
2.	September 3, 2011	Windhoek, Namibia	Gambia	1–0	Win	2012 Africa Cup of Nations qualification
