= Hervé Arsène =

Malagasy footballer and manager (born 1963)

Personal information
- Date of birth: 30 October 1963 (age 62)
- Place of birth: Nosy Be, Madagascar
- Height: 1.74 m (5 ft 9 in)
- Position: Defender

Youth career
- –1982: AS Sotema

Senior career*
Years	Team	Apps	(Gls)
1982–1985	AS Sotema		
1985–1987	US Saint André		
1987–1989	Lens	38	(1)
1989–1991	La Roche Vendée Football	64	(6)
1991–1998	Lens	187	(2)
Total		289	(10)

International career
1985–1997	Madagascar	7	(0)

Managerial career
- 2007–2008: Madagascar
- * Club domestic league appearances and goals

Hervé Arsène (born 30 October 1963) is a Malagasy football coach and former player who played as a defender with US Saint André, RC Lens and La Roche Vendée Football.

== Career ==
Born in Nosy Be, Madagascar, Arsène began playing football for local side AS Sotema. In 1985, he moved to Réunion where he played for US Saint-André.

In 1987, Arsène joined Ligue 1 side RC Lens, and he spent nearly a decade with the club, winning the 1997–98 French Division 1 title during his tenure. He also spent two seasons in Ligue 2 with La Roche Vendée Football.

He has also managed the Malagasy national side.

== Personal life ==
Arsène holds Malagasy and French nationalities. Arsène's son, Faed, is also an international footballer from Madagascar.

== Career statistics ==
=== International ===
Appearances and goals by national team and year
National team	Year	Apps	Goals
Madagascar	1985	3	0
Madagascar	1986	0	0
Madagascar	1987	2	0
Madagascar	1988	0	0
Madagascar	1989	0	0
Madagascar	1990	0	0
Madagascar	1991	0	0
Madagascar	1992	0	0
Madagascar	1993	0	0
Madagascar	1994	0	0
Madagascar	1995	0	0
Madagascar	1996	0	0
Madagascar	1997	1	0
Total		7	0
