= Jean José Razafimaninory =

Malagasy footballer (born 1989)

Jean José Tigana Razafimaninory (born 27 December 1989 in Antananarivo) is a Malagasy footballer who played at 2012 Africa Cup of Nations qualification.
