= 2015 Africa Cup of Nations qualification Group B =

Football tournament qualification stage

Group B of the 2015 Africa Cup of Nations qualification tournament was one of the seven groups to decide the teams which qualified for the 2015 Africa Cup of Nations finals tournament. Group B consisted of four teams: Algeria, Mali, Malawi, and Ethiopia, who played against each other home-and-away in a round-robin format.

== Standings ==
Team	Pld	W	D	L	GF	GA	GD	Pts	ALG	MLI	MWI	ETH
Algeria	6	5	0	1	11	4	+7	15		1–0	3–0	3–1
Mali	6	3	0	3	8	6	+2	9	2–0		2–0	2–3
Malawi	6	2	1	3	5	9	−4	7	0–2	2–0		3–2
Ethiopia	6	1	1	4	7	12	−5	4	1–2	0–2	0–0	

== Matches ==
6 September 2014
16:00 UTC+3

Ethiopia	1–2	Algeria
Saladin 90+5' (pen.)	Report	Soudani 35'; Brahimi 83'

Addis Ababa Stadium, Addis Ababa
Referee: Bernard Camille (Seychelles)
7 September 2014 (Note: The Mali v Malawi match was originally to be played on 6 September 2014, 19:00 UTC±0, but was postponed due to heavy rain.)
16:00 UTC±0

Mali	2–0	Malawi
Sako 52'; Diabaté 90'	Report

Stade du 26 Mars, Bamako
Referee: Joshua Amao (Nigeria)

10 September 2014
14:30 UTC+2

Malawi	3–2	Ethiopia
Nyondo 15', 69'; F. Banda 65'	Report	Getaneh 45+1'; Saleh 87'

Kamuzu Stadium, Blantyre
Referee: El Fadil Mohamed (Sudan)
10 September 2014
20:30 UTC+1

Algeria	1–0	Mali
Medjani 82'	Report

Stade Mustapha Tchaker, Blida
Referee: Sidi Alioum (Cameroon)

11 October 2014
14:30 UTC+2

Malawi	0–2	Algeria
	Report	Halliche 10'; Mesbah 90'

Kamuzu Stadium, Blantyre
Referee: Victor Gomes (South Africa)
11 October 2014
16:00 UTC+3

Ethiopia	0–2	Mali
	Report	Diaby 33'; S. Yatabaré 62'

Addis Ababa Stadium, Addis Ababa
Referee: Mohamed Said Kordi (Tunisia)

15 October 2014
18:00 UTC±0

Mali	2–3	Ethiopia
Sako 31'; M. Yatabaré 68'	Report	Oumed 35'; Getaneh 45+4'; Abebaw 90+1'

Stade du 26 Mars, Bamako
Referee: Hamada Nampiandraza (Madagascar)
15 October 2014
20:30 UTC+1

Algeria	3–0	Malawi
Brahimi 1'; Mahrez 45'; Slimani 55'	Report

Stade Mustapha Tchaker, Blida
Referee: El Fadil Mohamed (Sudan)

15 November 2014
14:30 UTC+2

Malawi	2–0	Mali
Ng'ambi 64'; Kanyenda 85'	Report

Kamuzu Stadium, Blantyre
Referee: Hudu Munyemana (Rwanda)
15 November 2014
20:30 UTC+1

Algeria	3–1	Ethiopia
Feghouli 32'; Mahrez 40'; Brahimi 44'	Report	Oumed 21'

Stade Mustapha Tchaker, Blida
Referee: Ali Lemghaifry (Mauritania)

19 November 2014
16:00 UTC±0

Mali	2–0	Algeria
Keita 28' (pen.); M. Yatabaré 51'	Report

Stade du 26 Mars, Bamako
Referee: Joseph Lamptey (Ghana)
19 November 2014
19:00 UTC+3

Ethiopia	0–0	Malawi
	Report

Addis Ababa Stadium, Addis Ababa
Referee: Rédouane Jiyed (Morocco)

== Goalscorers ==
3 goals

- (Algeria) Yacine Brahimi

2 goals

- (Algeria) Riyad Mahrez
- (Mali) Bakary Sako
- (Mali) Mustapha Yatabaré
- (Malawi) Atusaye Nyondo
- (Ethiopia) Getaneh Kebede
- (Ethiopia) Oumed Oukri

1 goals

- (Algeria) Hillal Soudani
- (Algeria) Carl Medjani
- (Algeria) Rafik Halliche
- (Algeria) Djamel Mesbah
- (Algeria) Sofiane Feghouli
- (Mali) Cheick Diabaté
- (Mali) Abdoulay Diaby
- (Mali) Sambou Yatabaré
- (Mali) Seydou Keita
- (Malawi) Frank Banda
- (Malawi) Robert Ng'ambi
- (Malawi) Essau Kanyenda
- (Ethiopia) Saladin Said
- (Ethiopia) Yussuf Saleh
- (Ethiopia) Abebaw Butako
