= Kondo Arimiyaou =

Togolese footballer

Personal information
- Full name: Kondo Arimiyaou
- Date of birth: 18 February 1991 (age 35)
- Place of birth: Lomé, Togo
- Position: Midfielder

Team information
- Current team: AS Douanes Lomé
- Number: 19

Senior career*
Years	Team	Apps	(Gls)
2009–2012	Okiti de Badou		
2012	CA Batna		
2013–	AS Douanes Lomé		

International career
2011–	Togo	5	(2)
- * Club domestic league appearances and goals

Kondo Arimiyaou (Arabic: كوندو) (born February 18, 1991, in Lomé) is a Togolese footballer, who currently plays as a midfielder for AS Douanes Lomé.

== Career ==
On August 7, 2012, Kondo signed for the Algerian club CA Batna.

He scored on his international debut versus Niger on 10 August 2011.

On his second appearance, he scored the only goal of the game against Botswana in September 2011, in a 2012 Africa Cup of Nations qualification game.
