= Frank Banda =

Malawian professional footballer

Personal information
- Full name: Frank Banda
- Date of birth: 12 January 1991 (age 35)
- Place of birth: Malawi
- Position: Midfielder

Team information
- Current team: UD Songo
- Number: 26

Senior career*
Years	Team	Apps	(Gls)
2007–2010	Blue Eagles		
2010–2015	Civo United		
2015	→ UD Songo (loan)		
2016–	UD Songo		

International career^{‡}
2010–	Malawi	38	(3)
- * Club domestic league appearances and goals ‡ National team caps and goals as of 19 July 2018

Frank Banda (born 12 January 1991) is a Malawian professional footballer who plays as a midfielder.

On 23 January 2015, Banda join UD Songo on a season loan.

== International career ==
=== International goals ===
Scores and results list Malawi's goal tally first.

No	Date	Venue	Opponent	Score	Result	Competition
1.	17 November 2010	Kamuzu Stadium, Blantyre, Malawi	Rwanda	1–1	2–1	Friendly
2.	28 May 2012	Amaan Stadium, Zanzibar City, Zanzibar	Zanzibar	?–?	1–1	Friendly
3.	10 September 2014	Kamuzu Stadium, Blantyre, Malawi	Ethiopia	2–1	3–2	2015 Africa Cup of Nations qualification
