= Manucho =

Angolan footballer (born 1983)

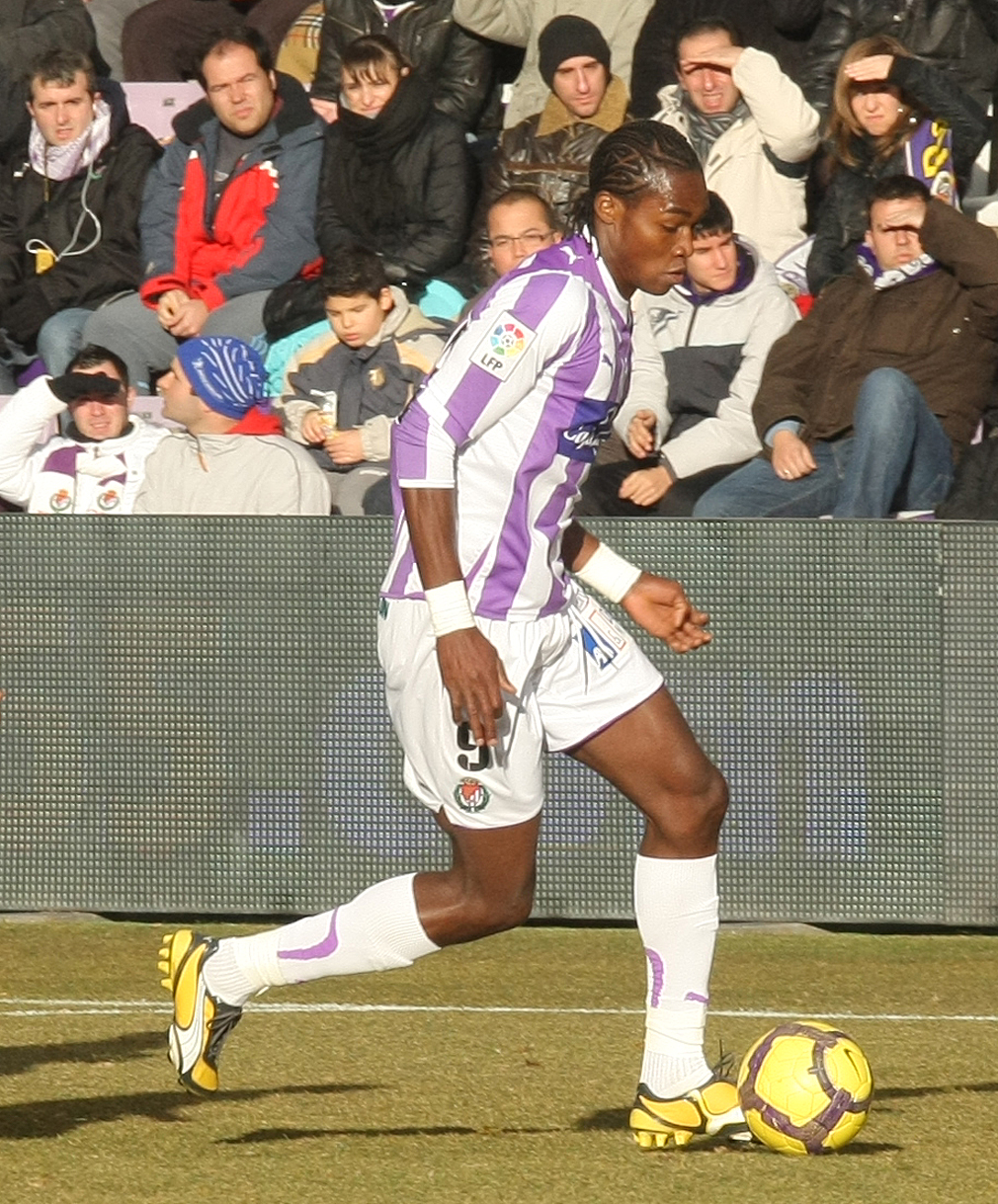
- Manucho playing for Real Valladolid in 2010

Personal information
- Full name: Mateus Alberto Contreiras Gonçalves
- Date of birth: 7 March 1983 (age 43)
- Place of birth: Luanda, Angola
- Height: 1.87 m (6 ft 1 1/2 in)
- Position: Striker

Youth career
- 1997–1999: Flaminguinhos

Senior career*
| Years | Team | Apps | (Gls) |
| 1999–2002 | Benfica de Luanda | 12 | (5) |
| 2002–2008 | Petro Atlético | 78 | (34) |
| 2008–2009 | Manchester United | 1 | (0) |
| 2008 | → Panathinaikos (loan) | 10 | (4) |
| 2009 | → Hull City (loan) | 13 | (2) |
| 2009–2014 | Valladolid | 98 | (19) |
| 2010 | → Bucaspor (loan) | 12 | (2) |
| 2011 | → Manisaspor (loan) | 9 | (0) |
| 2014–2018 | Rayo Vallecano | 112 | (14) |
| 2018–2019 | Cornellà | 16 | (1) |
| Total | | 361 | (81) |

International career
| 2006–2017 | Angola | 53 | (22) |
- * Club domestic league appearances and goals

Mateus Alberto Contreiras Gonçalves (born 7 March 1983), commonly known as Manucho, is an Angolan former professional footballer who played as a striker.

Manucho moved from Petro Atletico to Manchester United in January 2008. Before playing a game for United, however, he was loaned out to Greek side Panathinaikos for the remainder of the 2007–08 season due to issues with obtaining a UK work permit. Manucho received a work permit soon after returning to Manchester United for pre-season training in July 2008, and made his debut for the club in the League Cup against Middlesbrough on 23 September 2008. Short of first team opportunities at Old Trafford, however, on 16 January 2009 he joined Hull City on loan until the end of the 2008–09 season. Having failed to break into the Manchester United first team, Manucho joined Real Valladolid in July 2009.

He was also a member of the Angolan national team, representing them at four Africa Cups of Nations.

During his career, he had many nicknames, given by his fans, but the one that remains most famous and by which he is still known is "El Ciola", given to him by Real Valladolid fans in 2009.

== Club career ==
=== Early career ===
Manucho began his football career at Flaminguinhos, a small youth football club from Terra Nova, Luanda, where he lived. Under the guidance of his coach and father, Alberto Gonçalves, Manucho plied his trade as a left winger, becoming one of the club's top stars.

Upon turning professional, Manucho signed for Benfica de Luanda, a mid-table club in the Angolan league. He then moved to Luanda-based side Petro Atlético, where he initially struggled to break into the team due to the presence of striker Flávio Amado. After Flávio joined Egyptian side Al Ahly, Manucho began to establish himself in the side, scoring 16 goals in 2006 and 15 in 2007.

=== Manchester United, loans at Panathinaikos and Hull City ===
On 21 December 2007, it was announced that Manucho had agreed to sign for English Premier League champions Manchester United. He joined the club in January 2008 on a three-year contract. Prior to the announcement, Manucho had been on a three-week trial with the Manchester club, during which he managed to impress United manager Alex Ferguson enough to earn himself a contract.

On 31 January 2008, it was reported that Manucho was due to head out on loan to Greek team Panathinaikos for the remainder of the 2007–08 season, due to complications obtaining a work permit, with a view to him gaining valuable first team experience. Ferguson announced on 1 February that Manucho had indeed been loaned out to Panathinaikos until the end of the season. The loan period began soon after Angola's elimination from the 2008 Africa Cup of Nations by Egypt. Manucho scored on his league debut for Panathinaikos in a 2–0 home win over AEL. Panathinaikos finished the Super League Greece 2007–08 season in third place, qualifying the team for a play-off for the remaining European places. Manucho scored three goals in this six-game mini tournament, helping Panathinaikos to top the play-off group and qualify for the second qualifying round of the 2008–09 UEFA Champions League.

At the end of the 2007–08 season, Manucho returned to United for pre-season training and the club's summer tour of South Africa. However, he had picked up a suspected metatarsal injury and was unable to play a part in the pre-season programme. In August, the club confirmed that they had re-applied for a work permit for Manucho. On 28 August, the Manchester Evening News reported that Manucho had received a work permit earlier that summer, which was confirmed on the official website. He was handed the number 26 shirt for the 2008–09 season, made his competitive first team debut as a substitute on 23 September in a League Cup Third Round tie at home to Middlesbrough. The game ended 3–1 to United. Manucho made his league debut for United on 15 November, coming on as a 74th-minute substitute for Carlos Tevez in a home match against Stoke City. Ten minutes after coming on, Manucho was involved in the build-up to United's fourth goal by Danny Welbeck. On 18 December, Manucho scored his first goal in a United shirt, heading home Magnus Wolff Eikrem's cross to earn United's reserve side a 1–1 draw against Everton in a Reserve League North match.

Having found first team opportunities hard to come by at Manchester United, on 16 January 2009 Manucho agreed to join Hull City on loan until the end of the 2008–09 season. He received a renewed work permit later that day and appeared as a substitute in a 3–1 home defeat by Arsenal on 17 January. On 4 March 2009, he scored his first Premier League goal, a last-minute winner for Hull City in a 1–0 away victory at Fulham.

=== Real Valladolid ===
After his loan spell with Hull, Manucho was deemed surplus to requirements at Manchester United, and on 17 July 2009, the club agreed a deal with Real Valladolid for the player's transfer. He signed a five-year contract with the Spanish club and was presented as a Real Valladolid player on 20 July 2009. After joining Valladolid, Manucho promised to score forty goals in a season for the club; he scored five in his first season. On 13 September 2009, he scored his first goal for the club in a 4–2 defeat against Valencia. Then he had to wait until 5 December 2009 for his next goal which earned them a vital point away to title challengers Sevilla.

==== Bucaspor (loan) ====
In summer 2010, Manucho signed with Bucaspor on a loan deal from Real Valladolid. He made his debut on 23 August at 0–0 against Kasımpaşa S.K. His next game on 28 August 2010, Manucho scored his first goal against Gençlerbirliği. On 22 November 2010, Manucho scored and provided an assist for Musa Aydın in a 5–2 loss against Turkish champion Fenerbahçe. Despite the loss, Manucho was the hero when he scored a winning goal against Fenerbahçe in a 3–2 win to send the club through to the Turkiye Kupasi on 21 December 2010. This match turned out to be last appearance for Bucaspor. Later, the agreement at the club has been terminated unilaterally over the circuit between the payment of claims.

==== Manisaspor (loan) ====
Manucho signed end of January 2011 with another Turkish team Manisaspor until the end of the season. He made his debut for Manisaspor in 3–1 loss against Fenerbahçe on 5 February 2011. On the final season of the Turkey League on 14 May 2011, Manucho made his last appearance for the club when he provided assist for Murat Erdoğan in a 4–2 win over his former team, Bucaspor, whom he had played for earlier in the season.

=== Rayo Vallecano ===
On 13 June 2014, Manucho signed a one-year deal with Spanish team Rayo Vallecano.

=== Cornellà ===
On 18 September 2018, Manucho signed for Spanish third division team UE Cornellà.

== International career ==
Manucho plays international football for Angola. He was a member of the Angolan squad during his nation's successful qualification campaign for the 2008 African Cup of Nations.

In January 2008, he was named in the Angolan squad for the 2008 African Cup of Nations in Ghana. He scored the opening goal in Angola's first game against South Africa, and struck a further two goals in their second match against Senegal in a 3–1 win. On 4 February, Manucho scored Angola's only goal in a 2–1 loss to Egypt. Although the result meant Angola were knocked out of the tournament, Manucho's 25-yard effort was described as "the goal of the tournament so far". At the end of the tournament, Manucho was included in the "Best XI", a team of the best players in each position.

In the 2010 Africa Cup of Nations, he scored from the penalty spot in the opening game for Angola in the 4–4 draw with Mali.

In the 2012 Africa Cup of Nations, he scored a long-range effort against Burkina Faso. In Angola's next match, Manucho scored a brace in a 2–2 draw against Sudan. In Angola's next match against Ivory Coast, Manucho couldn't save the team to go to the Quarter Final of African Cup Of Nations as Ivory Coast beat Angola 2–0. Despite Angola's elimination in the group stage, Manucho's three goals meant he finished as the tournament's joint-top scorer, along with Houssine Kharja of Morocco, Christopher Katongo and Emmanuel Mayuka of Zambia, Pierre-Emerick Aubameyang of Gabon, Didier Drogba of Ivory Coast and Cheick Diabaté of Mali.

=== International goals ===
Scores and results list Angola's goal tally first.

| No | Date | Venue | Opponent | Score | Result | Competition |
|---|---|---|---|---|---|---|
| 1 | 18 November 2006 | Uhuru Stadium, Dar es Salaam, Tanzania | Tanzania | 1–1 | 1–1 | Friendly |
| 2 | 28 July 2007 | Botswana National Stadium, Gaborone, Botswana | Lesotho | 1–0 | 2–0 | 2007 COSAFA Cup |
| 3 | 8 September 2007 | Nyayo National Stadium, Nairobi, Kenya | Kenya | 1–1 | 1–2 | 2008 Africa Cup of Nations qualification |
| 4 | 13 January 2008 | Complexo Desportivo FC Alverca, Alverca do Ribatejo, Portugal | Egypt | 3–2 | 3–3 | Friendly |
| 5 | 23 January 2008 | Tamale Stadium, Tamale, Ghana | South Africa | 1–0 | 1–1 | 2008 Africa Cup of Nations |
| 6 | 27 January 2008 | Tamale Stadium, Tamale, Ghana | Senegal | 1–1 | 3–1 | 2008 Africa Cup of Nations |
| 7 | 27 January 2008 | Tamale Stadium, Tamale, Ghana | Senegal | 2–1 | 3–1 | 2008 Africa Cup of Nations |
| 8 | 4 February 2008 | Baba Yara Stadium, Kumasi, Ghana | Egypt | 1–1 | 1–2 | 2008 Africa Cup of Nations |
| 9 | 3 January 2010 | Complexo Desportivo de VRSA, Vila Real de Santo António, Portugal | Gambia | 1–1 | 1–1 | Friendly |
| 10 | 10 January 2010 | Estádio 11 de Novembro, Luanda, Angola | Mali | 4–0 | 4–4 | 2010 Africa Cup of Nations |
| 11 | 14 January 2010 | Estádio 11 de Novembro, Luanda, Angola | Malawi | 2–0 | 2–0 | 2010 Africa Cup of Nations |
| 12 | 26 March 2011 | Nyayo National Stadium, Nairobi, Kenya | Kenya | 1–0 | 1–2 | 2012 Africa Cup of Nations qualification |
| 13 | 5 June 2011 | Estádio de 11 Novembro, Luanda, Angola | Kenya | 1–0 | 1–0 | 2012 Africa Cup of Nations qualification |
| 14 | 4 September 2011 | Estádio Nacional do Chiazi, Cabinda, Angola | Uganda | 1–0 | 2–0 | 2012 Africa Cup of Nations qualification |
| 15 | 8 October 2011 | Estádio 24 de Setembro, Bissau, Guinea-Bissau | Guinea-Bissau | 1–0 | 2–0 | 2012 Africa Cup of Nations qualification |
| 16 | 14 January 2012 | Estádio Nacional do Chiazi, Cabinda, Angola | Sierra Leone | 1–0 | 3–1 | Friendly |
| 17 | 22 January 2012 | Estadio de Malabo, Malabo, Equatorial Guinea | Burkina Faso | 2–1 | 2–1 | 2012 Africa Cup of Nations |
| 18 | 26 January 2012 | Estadio de Malabo, Malabo, Equatorial Guinea | Sudan | 1–0 | 2–2 | 2012 Africa Cup of Nations |
| 19 | 26 January 2012 | Estadio de Malabo, Malabo, Equatorial Guinea | Sudan | 2–1 | 2–2 | 2012 Africa Cup of Nations |
| 20 | 15 August 2012 | Estádio Nacional de Ombaka, Benguela, Angola | Mozambique | 2–0 | 2–0 | Friendly |
| 21 | 14 October 2012 | Estádio 11 do Novembro, Luanda, Angola | Zimbabwe | 1–0 | 2–0 | 2013 Africa Cup of Nations qualification |
| 22 | 14 October 2012 | Estádio 11 do Novembro, Luanda, Angola | Zimbabwe | 2–0 | 2–0 | 2013 Africa Cup of Nations qualification |
| 23 | 13 January 2013 | Volkswagen Dobsonville Stadium, Soweto, South Africa | Botswana | 2-0 | 2-0 | Friendly |

== Honours ==
Rayo Vallecano

- Segunda División: 2017–18

Angola

- COSAFA Cup runner-up: 2006

Individual

- Girabola Top Scorer: 2006, 2007
- African Cup of Nations top goal scorer: 2012
- African Cup of Nations Team of the Tournament: 2012
