= Moses Chavula =

Malawian footballer

Personal information
- Date of birth: 8 August 1985 (age 41)
- Place of birth: Blantyre, Malawi
- Height: 1.67 m (5 ft 6 in)
- Position: Left-back

Team information
- Current team: ENH de Vilankulos

Senior career*
| Years | Team | Apps | (Gls) |
| –2005 | Silver Strikers | | |
| 2005–2008 | MTL Wanderers | | |
| 2008–2011 | Nathi Lions | | |
| 2011–2012 | AmaZulu | 12 | (0) |
| 2012 | MTL Wanderers | | |
| 2013 | CD Maxaquene | | |
| 2014 | CD Costa do Sol | | |
| 2015– | ENH de Vilankulos | | |

International career^{‡}
| 2003–2014 | Malawi | 78 | (5) |
- * Club domestic league appearances and goals as of 7 August 2021 ‡ National team caps and goals as of 7 August 2021

Moses Chavula (born 8 August 1985) is a Malawian footballer who plays as a defender for ENH de Vilankulos.

A longtime member of the Malawi national football team, Chavula has competed for his national team since 2003. Chavula is a left-footed player and plays as left-back for his team and Malawi.
