= Mahamadou Sidibé =

Malian footballer

Personal information
- Date of birth: 8 October 1978 (age 48)
- Place of birth: Bamako, Mali
- Height: 1.90 m (6 ft 3 in)
- Position: Goalkeeper

Senior career*
Years	Team	Apps	(Gls)
1994–1996	Real Bamako		
1997–1999	El Qanah FC		
2000–2001	Al Ahli Saudi FC		
2001–2002	Athinaikos	14	(0)
2002–2006	Egaleo	81	(0)
2006–2007	Kerkyra	30	(0)
2007–2008	PAS Giannina	4	(0)
2008–2009	Ethnikos Achna	31	(0)
2009–2010	Omonia	2	(0)
Total		162	(0)

International career
1995–2010	Mali	97	(0)
- * Club domestic league appearances and goals

Mahamadou Sidibé (born 8 October 1978) is a Malian former professional footballer who played as a goalkeeper. He spent the majority of his career in Greece.

== Club career ==
Born in Bamako, Mali, Sidibé began his career at Real Bamako. His first club abroad was Egyptian club El Qanah FC. Following a stint in Saudi Arabia with Al Ahli Saudi, he continued his career in Greece where played for PAS Giannia, Egaleo, Athinaikos and Ethnikos Achna FC. In June 2009, Sidibé joined AC Omonia of Cyprus as a third selection goalkeeper.

== International career ==
Sidibé played 97 international matches for the Mali national team.

== Honours ==
Omonia

- Cypriot Championship: 2010
