= Alsény Këïta =

Liberian footballer

Personal information
- Full name: Alsény Këïta Kamolosilah
- Date of birth: 26 June 1983 (age 43)
- Place of birth: Macenta, Guinea
- Height: 1.71 m (5 ft 7 in)
- Position: Midfielder

Youth career
- 1998: Horoya AC

Senior career*
Years	Team	Apps	(Gls)
1999–2000	Horoya AC	20	(5)
2001–2002	FUS Rabat	27	(3)
2002–2003	SC Chabab Mohammedia	36	(9)
2003–2005	FC Luzern	33	(1)
2006–2007	Gazélec Ajaccio	25	(1)
2007–2012	US Sénart-Moissy	114	(6)
2009	→ Satellite FC (loan)	4	(1)
2012–2014	Drancy	32	(0)
2012–2018	Viry-Châtillon	22	(0)
2018–2019	FC Gobelins	18	(0)
Total		329	(26)

International career
2004	Guinea U23	2	(0)
2004–2008	Guinea	4	(0)
2011–2016	Liberia	18	(1)
- * Club domestic league appearances and goals

Alsény Këïta Kamolosilah (born 26 June 1983), also known as Al Husein Keita, is a former professional footballer who played as a midfielder. Born and raised in Guinea, he played for Guinea's youth and senior level national teams. In 2011 however, Këïta switched to the Liberia national football team.

== Club career ==
Born in Macenta, Guinea, Këïta began his career with Horoya AC. In 2000, he joined Moroccan club FUS Rabat, where he played one year before signing for SC Chabab Mohammedia. After two seasons there he signed with FC Luzern in July 2003.

In July 2006, after two years with FC Luzern Këïta joined CFA team Gazélec Ajaccio. After one year with Ajaccio, he signed for US Sénart-Moissy in summer 2007. In summer 2009 he joined Guinean club Satellite FC on loan for half year before returning to Sénart-Moissy in January 2010.

== International career ==
Këïta was a part of the Guinean squad at the 2004 Olympic Games qualification tournament. He later represented Liberia at international level, also captaining the side.

== Personal life ==
Alsény is the twin brother of professional Guinean footballer Alhassane Keita.

== Honors ==
- Guinée Championnat National: 2000
- CAF Cup: runner-up 2001
- Botola: 2002
- Moroccan Player of the Year: 2002
- Swiss Cup: runner-up 2005
