= Jimmy Zakazaka =

Malawian footballer

Personal information
- Full name: Jimmy Zakazaka
- Date of birth: 27 December 1984 (age 41)
- Place of birth: Malawi
- Position: Forward

Senior career*
Years	Team	Apps	(Gls)
2004–2005	Big Bullets F.C.	11	(13)
2005–2007	Free State Stars F.C.	31	(14)
2007–2010	Bay United F.C.	51	(11)
2010–2012	African Wanderers		
2012	Thanda Royal Zulu F.C.	3	(0)
2013–	FC Cape Town	8	(0)

International career
2004–	Malawi	34	(3)
- * Club domestic league appearances and goals

Jimmy Zakazaka (born 27 December 1984) is a Malawian football (soccer) player who has played at international level for Malawi. His position is striker. Clubs he has played for include Free State Stars and Bay United.

== International goals ==
#	Date	Venue	Opponent	Score	Result	Competition
1	June 11, 2005	Lusaka	Lesotho	2–1	Win	2005 COSAFA Cup
2	October 8, 2005	Blantyre	Kenya	3–0	Win	2006 FIFA World Cup qualification
3	October 9, 2010	Blantyre	Chad	6–2	Win	2012 Africa Cup of Nations qualification
