= Swadic Sanudi =

Malawian footballer

Personal information
- Date of birth: 21 October 1983 (age 43)
- Place of birth: Malawi
- Position: Goalkeeper

Team information
- Current team: Dynamos
- Number: 1

Senior career*
Years	Team	Apps	(Gls)
1999–2000	AmaZulu	4	(0)
2000–2001	Jomo Cosmos	8	(0)
2001–2005	Big Bullets	35	(0)
2005–2010	Dynamos	73	(0)
2010-2011	African Wanderers	0	(0)
2011-2017	Big Bullets	0	(0)

International career^{‡}
2000–2011	Malawi	57	(0)
- * Club domestic league appearances and goals as of 15:36, 13 February 2010 (UTC) ‡ National team caps and goals as of 15:36, 13 February 2010 (UTC)

Swadic Sanudi (born 21 October 1983) is a Malawian former former footballer who played for Dynamos and the Malawi national team as a goalkeeper.

== Club career ==
Sanudi started his career with AmaZulu in 1999, where he made four appearances. He joined Jomo Cosmos in 2000 and made eight appearances for them. He joined Big Bullets in 2001 and made 35 appearances. He moved to Dynamos in 2005 and made 73 appearances. In 2010, he moved to African Wanderers and made 0 appearances. In 2011, he returned to Big Bullets, made no appearances and retired in 2017.

== International career ==
He made his debut for the Malawi national team in 2000. He was named in the 2010 African Cup of Nations team. He started in Malawi's opening game of the competition, keeping a clean sheet in a 3–0 victory over Algeria. He left the team in 2011.
