= Charlie Dopékoulouyen =

Central African footballer

Personal information
- Full name: Charlie Dopékoulouyen
- Date of birth: 2 January 1991 (age 35)
- Place of birth: Mobaye, Central African Republic
- Height: 1.82 m (5 ft 11 1/2 in)
- Position: Forward

Team information
- Current team: Raja Casablanca

Senior career*
Years	Team	Apps	(Gls)
2009–2010	Union Sportive Monastir	?	(?)
2011–	Raja Casablanca	0	(0)

International career^{‡}
2010–	Central African Republic	1	(1)
- * Club domestic league appearances and goals as of 26 January 2011 (UTC) ‡ National team caps and goals as of 26 January 2011

Charlie Dopékoulouyen (born 2 January 1991 in Mobaye) is a Central African footballer who plays as a forward for Raja Casablanca and the Central African Republic.
