= Rui Marques =

Angolan footballer

Personal information
- Full name: Rui Manuel Marques
- Date of birth: 3 September 1977 (age 49)
- Place of birth: Luanda, Angola
- Height: 1.81 m (5 ft 11 in)
- Position: Centre back

Youth career
- Benfica

Senior career*
Years	Team	Apps	(Gls)
1998–1999	FC Baden	27	(0)
1999–2000	SSV Ulm	32	(0)
2000–2001	Hertha BSC	0	(0)
2001	→ VfB Stuttgart (loan)	12	(0)
2001–2004	VfB Stuttgart	35	(0)
2004–2005	Marítimo	8	(0)
2005–2010	Leeds United	90	(4)
2006	→ Hull City (loan)	1	(0)
Total		205	(4)

International career
2006–2010	Angola	21	(0)
- * Club domestic league appearances and goals

Rui Manuel Marques (born 3 September 1977) is an Angolan former football defender who was a first choice centre-back for the Angola national team. Born in Angola, Marques moved to Portugal as a child.

== Club career ==
=== Early career ===
After coming through the youth ranks at Portuguese club Benfica, Marques left to join Swiss side FC Baden. Following his spell at Baden, he began his professional career at Germany's SSV Ulm 1846 in the 1999–2000 season. He subsequently moved to Hertha BSC, but did not appear in a single match for the first team in the Bundesliga.

After only six months with Hertha, Marques moved to fellow Bundesliga club VfB Stuttgart, spending three and a half seasons there and winning the 2002 UEFA Intertoto Cup after beating French side Lille. In the 2004–05 season, he moved back to Portugal to join Primeira Liga side Marítimo in Madeira. However, after struggling to break into the first team, Marques was released after just one season. As a free agent, he then began to look for clubs abroad.

=== Leeds United ===
Prior to the 2005–06 season, Marques went on trial to Ipswich Town, where he impressed then manager Joe Royle enough to want to sign him permanently. However, Marques instead chose to move to Leeds United on a free transfer. He was signed by manager Kevin Blackwell, but Marques made only one appearance for Leeds in the 2005–06 season in the League Cup against Oldham Athletic, in which he was clearly very nervous and uncomfortable playing out of position at right-back. Marques did not feature again for Leeds that season, with Paul Butler, Sean Gregan, Matthew Kilgallon, Clarke Carlisle and Michael Duberry all ahead of him in the pecking order. Towards the end of the 2005–06 season, he joined Hull City on a short-term loan, though his loan was cut short due to injury. He then returned to Leeds. He represented Angola in the 2006 FIFA World Cup, and was one of two Leeds players to take part in that tournament, Eddie Lewis being the other, for the United States.

The 2006–07 campaign again saw Marques overlooked by manager Kevin Blackwell, and initially again by the new Leeds manager Dennis Wise, who said Marques would not feature under his leadership and was told he was free to leave the club, along with a number of other squad and fringe players.

Marques was eventually called up to the first team squad for Leeds' 2–1 victory against Coventry City on 1 January 2007, where he turned in a solid performance at centre-back. This performance saw Marques being rewarded with a long run in the starting lineup at Elland Road. With questions mounting about whether his contract would be extended, Marques stated he would prefer to concentrate on Leeds' relegation battle than signing a new deal. He was an instant hit with the fans. Despite some impressive performances, Marques' efforts were not enough to save Leeds from relegation to League One for the first time in club history. Nonetheless, Marques showed his commitment to the club and signed a new contract on 7 August 2007.

Marques was a regular starter in the first team and scored his first goal for Leeds on 18 August 2007 in the 4–1 drubbing of Southend United in the dying minutes of the match. Marques missed several matches in January 2008, joining the Angola national team for the 2008 African Cup of Nations.

On his return, Marques established himself as fourth-choice captain at Leeds, taking up the armband for most of March 2008 while Alan Thompson, Jonathan Douglas and Andy Hughes were out injured. Marques incurred an injury and was replaced by Paul Huntington in Leeds' starting line-up. Due to Huntington's fantastic form, Marques was kept out of the side for the rest of the season, only being limited to occasional substitute appearances.

Before he left the club, manager Dennis Wise stated he would offer Marques a new contract; Wise even said Marques should wait longer before signing the deal to help get a wage increase. Upon his arrival, new manager Gary McAllister offered Marques a new contract, however talks stalled, with the length of the contract appearing to be the deciding factor in Marques' decision. Talks were delayed until the summer and Leeds reached the League One playoff final, but lost 1–0 against Doncaster Rovers. During the summer, Marques was linked to a move to the Premier League, with him interesting Roy Keane's Sunderland. However, on 20 May 2008, he signed a new contract with Leeds, contracting him to the club for a further two seasons.

At the start of the 2008–09 season, Marques, who is fluent in Spanish, acted as a translator for new Argentine signing Luciano Becchio. After a poor start to the 2008–09 season, with Leeds' defence leaking a lot of goals, McAllister was sacked and was replaced by Simon Grayson. Marques scored in Leeds' 2–0 win against Southend United on 28 January 2009. Marques played regularly under Grayson and began partnering new signing Richard Naylor, but when Sam Sodje was signed on loan from Reading, Marques lost his place when he suffered an hamstring injury. Leeds reached the playoff semi-finals but lost to Millwall.

With Sam Sodje's loan spell over and captain Richard Naylor injured, Marques found himself as first choice central defence partnership with Patrick Kisnorbo at the start of the 2009–10 season. However, Marques lost his starting place when he suffered an Achilles injury while on international duty in September, and dropped down the pecking order when he was out injured when Leeds completed the signing of Leigh Bromby. Marques' injury kept him out for a prolonged period lasting over several matches. After featuring in some reserve matches and closed-door friendlies, Marques returned from injury and was named to the substitutes' bench against Kettering Town. After his spell out injured, he was behind Patrick Kisnorbo, Richard Naylor, Leigh Bromby and Ľubomír Michalík in the pecking order for Leeds. Marques was named on the bench against Oldham Athletic and kept his place on the bench against Huddersfield Town. When Naylor and Kisnorbo both became fit, they returned to the starting lineup, with Michalík dropping to the substitutes' bench at Marques' expense.

Marques was unavailable for selection for Leeds during most of January 2010, as he was called up to host nation Angola's 2010 African Cup of Nations squad. The most high-profile games he was unavailable for was Leeds' 2009–10 FA Cup tie away to Manchester United and the away FA Cup tie to Tottenham Hotspur. Angola were eliminated from the Cup of Nations on 24 January, so Marques returned to Leeds. Marques incurred a small injury at the tournament, which kept him on the sidelines for a number of Leeds' matches. When he recovered, he never had a chance to play, even when the club was struggling to win a match for the last part of the season.

On 14 May 2010, it was announced Marques would not be offered a new contract at the club, meaning he was free to find a new club. At the time of his departure, Marques was the longest-serving player at the club.

== International career ==
Despite being eligible for the Portugal national team, Marques pledged his allegiance to the country of his birth, Angola. Marques played for Angola in the 2006 World Cup, where he played against Mexico, Iran and Portugal, with Angola finishing third in their group. Marques also played in the 2008 Africa Cup of Nations, in which he played in all of Angola's matches.

Marques was called up by Angola for the 2010 African Cup of Nations, where his country Angola were the host nation of the tournament, during this spell he was unavailable to play for Leeds. On 30 December 2009, he played in the 1–0 loss to Estonia, a friendly match as a warm-up for the Cup of Nations. He then played in the 1–1 draw against Gambia.

Angola's first match of the African Cup of Nations was against Mali, a match which Marques started. Angola were 4–0 up with 15 minutes to play, but chaotically conceded 4 goals in the last 15 minutes as the match finished 4–4, with the likes of Seydou Keita and Frédéric Kanouté scoring for Mali. Marques then played the entire match in Angola's 2–0 win over Malawi and also started in the 0–0 draw with Algeria, a match which enabled Angola to progress to the quarter-finals as winners of their group.

Marques' tournament came to an end when Angola were eliminated in the quarter-finals following a 1–0 loss to Ghana, with Asamoah Gyan scoring the winner. Marques would return to Leeds from the tournament with an injury.

== Honours ==
VfB Stuttgart

- UEFA Intertoto Cup: 2002
