= Elvis Kafoteka =

Malawian footballer

Personal information
- Full name: Elvis Bryson Kafoteka
- Date of birth: January 17, 1978 (age 48)
- Place of birth: Lilongwe, Malawi
- Position: Defender

Team information
- Current team: APR FC
- Number: 5

Youth career
- 2001–2004: CIVO United

Senior career*
Years	Team	Apps	(Gls)
2005–2007	CIVO United	48	(6)
2008	Hong Kong Rangers	7	(0)
2008–2009	Super ESCOM	28	(0)
2010–present	APR FC	14	(0)

International career
2003–present	Malawi	22	(2)
- * Club domestic league appearances and goals

Elvis Bryson Kafoteka (born January 17, 1978, in Lilongwe) was a Malawian international footballer, in 2014 he retired from playing football

== Career ==
Kafoteka began his career with CIVO United and signed in January 2008 for the Hong Kong Rangers FC. After a half year who earned 7 caps for Hong Kong Rangers FC returned to Malawi and signed with Super ESCOM. He played for Super ESCOM two years and joined in January 2010 to Rwandan club APR FC.

== International career ==
Kafoteka was a member of the (Malawi national football team) and one of the best right backs Malawi has produced.
