= Shaban Nditi =

Tanzanian footballer

Personal information
- Full name: Steven Shaaban Mussa Nditi
- Date of birth: March 5, 1983 (age 43)
- Place of birth: Dar es Salaam, Tanzania
- Position: Defensive midfielder

Team information
- Current team: Mtibwa Sugar FC

Senior career*
Years	Team	Apps	(Gls)
2002–2006	Mtibwa Sugar		
2006–2008	Simba		
2008–	Mtibwa Sugar		

International career^{‡}
2002–2012	Tanzania	62	(2)
- * Club domestic league appearances and goals as of 13 April 2021 ‡ National team caps and goals as of 13 April 2021

Shaban Nditi (born 5 March 1983) is a Tanzanian football midfielder who plays club football for Mtibwa Sugar FC and international football for Tanzania.
