= Eric Gasana =

Rwandan footballer

Personal information
- Date of birth: 15 May, 1986
- Positions: Right-back; midfielder

Youth career
- 2004-2005: Saint Eloi

Senior career*
Years	Team	Apps	(Gls)
2007-2013	APR		
- * Club domestic league appearances and goals ‡ National team caps and goals as of Rwanda

Eric Gasana (born May 15, 1986) is a Rwandan footballer who plays as a right-back. He participated at 2012 Africa Cup of Nations with the Rwanda national team.

== Career statistics ==
Scores and results list Rwanda's goal tally first, score column indicates score after each Gasana goal.

List of international goals scored by Eric Gasana
No.	Date	Venue	Opponent	Score	Result	Competition
1	5 January 2009	Mandela National Stadium, Kampala, Uganda	Somalia	1–0	3–0	2008 CECAFA Cup
2	5 January 2009	Mandela National Stadium, Kampala, Uganda	Somalia	2–0	3–0	2008 CECAFA Cup
3	26 March 2011	Stade Régional Nyamirambo, Kigali, Rwanda	Burundi	3–1	3–1	2012 Africa Cup of Nations qualification
