= Harry Nyirenda =

Malawian footballer

Personal information
- Full name: Harry Nyirenda
- Date of birth: 25 August 1990 (age 36)
- Place of birth: Blantyre, Malawi
- Height: 1.79 m (5 ft 10 1/2 in)
- Position: Defender

Team information
- Current team: Mighty Wanderers FC

Youth career
- 2007–2008: MTL Wanderers

Senior career*
Years	Team	Apps	(Gls)
2009–2010	MTL Wanderers	20	(2)
2010–2016	Black Leopards	27	(1)
2016–	Mighty Wanderers FC		

International career
2009–present	Malawi	9	(0)
- * Club domestic league appearances and goals

Harry Nyirenda (born 25 August 1990 in Blantyre, Malawi) is a Malawian footballer, who currently plays for South African side Mighty Wanderers FC.

== International career ==
Nyirenda made his debut for the Malawi national football team in 2009 and is part of the team competing at the 2010 African Cup of Nations.
