= Robert Ng'ambi =

Malawian footballer

Personal information
- Full name: Chizamusoka Robert Ng'ambi
- Date of birth: 11 September 1986 (age 40)
- Place of birth: Rumphi, Malawi
- Height: 1.82 m (5 ft 11 1/2 in)
- Position: Midfielder

Team information
- Current team: Black Leopards
- Number: 27

Youth career
- Young Soccer Stars
- Zingwangwa Pirates

Senior career*
Years	Team	Apps	(Gls)
2003–2005	Bakili Bullets	?	(?)
2005	Monomotapa United	?	(?)
2005–2011	Black Leopards	?	(?)
2011–2018	Platinum Stars	171	(37)
2019–2020	Black Leopards	21	(2)

International career^{‡}
- Malawi U17
2003–2017	Malawi	66	(8)
- * Club domestic league appearances and goals as of 1 November 2020 ‡ National team caps and goals as of 1 November 2020

Robert Ng'ambi (born 11 September 1986) is a Malawian retired footballer, who played most of his career for South African clubs Black Leopards and Platinum Stars. As a midfielder, he earned 66 caps with the Malawi national team.

He announced his retirement in October 2020, opting not to renew his contract deciding with Black Leopards, to allow more playing time for the youngsters.

== International career ==
At the youth level, he played in the 2001 COSAFA U-17 Cup, scoring against South Africa in the final.

=== International goals ===
Scores and results list Malawi's goal tally first.

No	Date	Venue	Opponent	Score	Result	Competition
1.	26 March 2008	Independence Stadium, Windhoek, Namibia	Namibia	2–0	3–1	Friendly
2.	31 May 2008	Kamuzu Stadium, Blantyre, Malawi	Djibouti	7–1	8–1	2010 FIFA World Cup qualification
3.	11 October 2008	Kamuzu Stadium, Blantyre, Malawi	DR Congo	1–1	2–1	2010 FIFA World Cup qualification
4.	9 October 2009	Kamuzu Stadium, Blantyre, Malawi	Chad	6–2	6–2	2012 Africa Cup of Nations qualification
5.	8 October 2011	Stade Omnisports Idriss Mahamat Ouya, N'Djamena, Chad	Chad	1–0	2–2	2012 Africa Cup of Nations qualification
6.	12 June 2013	Kamuzu Stadium, Blantyre, Malawi	Kenya	2–1	2–2	2014 FIFA World Cup qualification
7.	15 November 2014	Kamuzu Stadium, Blantyre, Malawi	Mali	1–0	2–0	2015 Africa Cup of Nations qualification
8.	7 October 2017	Uhuru Stadium, Dar es Salaam, Tanzania	Tanzania	1–0	1–1	Friendly

== Honours ==
=== International ===
Malawi U17

- COSAFA U-17 Cup: 2001
