= Ahmed Abdelkader (footballer, born 1986) =

Libyan footballer

Personal information
- Full name: Ahmed Wafa Abdelkader
- Date of birth: 17 September 1986 (age 40)
- Place of birth: Tripoli, Great Socialist People's Libyan Arab Jamahiriya

Senior career*
| Years | Team | Apps | (Gls) |
- Petrojet SC

International career
- Libya national football team
- * Club domestic league appearances and goals

Ahmed Wafa Abdelkader (Arabic: احمد وفا عبدالقادر); born 17 September 1986) is a Libyan footballer which plays the Petrojet as a striker. She played for Libya national football team at 2012 Africa Cup of Nations qualification.
