= Hellings Mwakasungula =

Malawian footballer

Personal information
- Full name: Hellings Mwakasungula
- Date of birth: 5 May 1980 (age 46)
- Place of birth: Lilongwe, Malawi
- Height: 1.76 m (5 ft 9 1/2 in)
- Position: Defensive midfielder

Youth career
- Silver Strikers

Senior career*
Years	Team	Apps	(Gls)
2002–2007	Silver Strikers		
2007–2008	Moroka Swallows	9	(0)
2009	Santos Cape Town	1	(0)
2009	Silver Strikers		

International career
2005–2019	Malawi	21	(1)
- * Club domestic league appearances and goals

Hellings Mwakasungula (born 5 May 1980 in Lilongwe) is a Malawian former professional footballer.

== International career ==
Mwakasungula was part of the Malawi national football team at 2010 Africa Cup of Nations. He scored a goal in a 2012 Africa Cup of Nations qualifier against Togo on 9 July 2010.

== Football ban ==
In April 2019 he was one of four African former international footballers banned for life by FIFA due to "match manipulation".
