= 2013 CEMAC Cup squads =

Football tournament squads

2013 CEMAC Cup was the eighth edition of the CEMAC Cup, the football championship of Central African nations. The tournament was held in Franceville and Bitam of Gabon from December 9–21.

== Group A ==
=== Cameroon ===
Coach: Dieudonné Nké

| No. | Pos. | Player | Date of birth (age) | Caps | Club |
|---|---|---|---|---|---|
| | GK | Loïc Feudjou | 14 April 1992 (aged 21) | | (Cameroon) Coton Sport |
| | GK | Hugo Nyamé | 16 April 1986 (aged 27) | | (Cameroon) Les Astres |
| | DF | Gustave Moundi Djengue | 16 February 1985 (aged 28) | | (Cameroon) Union Douala |
| | DF | Aminou Bouba | 28 January 1991 (aged 22) | | (Cameroon) Coton Sport |
| | DF | Carlain Manga Mbah | 13 January 1993 (aged 20) | | (Cameroon) Coton Sport |
| | DF | Francky Essombo | 22 August 1991 (aged 22) | | (Cameroon) Les Astres |
| | DF | Fabrice Ngah | 16 October 1997 (aged 16) | | (Cameroon) VJA Ngoulemakong |
| | MF | Stéphane Kingué Mpondo | 2 June 1985 (aged 28) | | (Cameroon) Coton Sport |
| | MF | Thierry Makon Nloga | 9 October 1993 (aged 20) | | (Tunisia) ES Tunis |
| | MF | Kombi Mandjang | 1 June 1992 (aged 21) | | (Cameroon) Union Douala |
| | MF | Mvondo Atangana | 4 March 1986 (aged 27) | | (Cameroon) Canon Yaoundé |
| | MF | Barnabé Atangana | 4 June 1987 (aged 26) | | (Cameroon) Unisport Bafang |
| | FW | Clévis Ashu Tambe | 1 January 1985 (aged 28) | | (Cameroon) Union Douala |
| | FW | Julien Ebah | 27 September 1990 (aged 23) | | (Cameroon) Union Douala |
| | FW | Raymond Fosso | 10 January 1993 (aged 20) | | (Cameroon) Unisport Bafang |
| | FW | Richard Njoh | 17 January 1995 (aged 18) | | (Cameroon) Douala AC |
| | FW | Ernest Nsombo | 6 March 1991 (aged 22) | | (Algeria) USM Alger |
| | FW | Martin Yon Loa | 13 June 1992 (aged 21) | | (Cameroon) Union Douala |

=== Equatorial Guinea ===
Coach: (Spain) Andoni Goikoetxea

| No. | Pos. | Player | Date of birth (age) | Caps | Club |
|---|---|---|---|---|---|
| | GK | Felipe Ovono | 26 July 1993 (aged 20) | | (Equatorial Guinea) Sony Ela Nguema |
| | DF | Jimmy Bermúdez | 16 December 1987 (aged 25) | | (Ecuador) LDU Loja |
| | DF | Diosdado Mbele | 8 April 1997 (aged 16) | | (Equatorial Guinea) Leones Vegetarianos |
| | DF | Lato Aka Ekanza | 26 December 1990 (aged 22) | | (Equatorial Guinea) Leones Vegetarianos |
| | DF | Miguel Ángel Mayé | 8 October 1995 (aged 18) | | (Equatorial Guinea) Akonangui |
| | MF | Juvenal Edjogo-Owono | 3 April 1979 (aged 34) | | (Spain) Cornellà |
| | MF | Jean-Maxime Ndongo | 8 November 1992 (aged 21) | | (Equatorial Guinea) Deportivo Mongomo |
| | MF | Samuel Nguema | | | (Equatorial Guinea) |
| | MF | Federico Bikoro | 17 March 1996 (aged 17) | | (Equatorial Guinea) Akonangui |
| | FW | Thierry Fidjeu-Tazemeta | 13 October 1982 (aged 31) | | (Austria) SV Horn |
| | FW | Viera Ellong | 14 June 1987 (aged 26) | | (Equatorial Guinea) The Panthers |
| | FW | Eusebio Edjang | 3 August 1990 (aged 23) | | (Equatorial Guinea) Deportivo Mongomo |
| | FW | Patrick Mvondo | 26 January 1991 (aged 22) | | (Equatorial Guinea) Leones Vegetarianos |

=== Gabon ===
Coach: Stéphane Bounguedza

| No. | Pos. | Player | Date of birth (age) | Caps | Club |
|---|---|---|---|---|---|
| | GK | Yves Bitséki Moto | 23 April 1983 (aged 30) | | (Gabon) Bitam |
| | GK | Paulin Nzambi | 5 May 1981 (aged 32) | | (Gabon) OM |
| | GK | Nick Moundounga | 25 February 1994 (aged 19) | | (Gabon) MangaSport |
| | DF | Erwin Nguéma Obame | 7 March 1989 (aged 24) | | (Gabon) Bitam |
| | DF | Martin Ndong Essono | 28 June 1988 (aged 25) | | (Gabon) MangaSport |
| | DF | Farel Mounguengui | 5 May 1988 (aged 25) | | (Gabon) Missile |
| | DF | Edmond Mouele | 18 February 1982 (aged 31) | | (Gabon) MangaSport |
| | MF | Emmanuel Ndong Mba | 4 May 1992 (aged 21) | | (Gabon) Bitam |
| | MF | Cyrille Avebe | 3 February 1977 (aged 36) | | (Gabon) Missile |
| | DF | Jean-René Nze Mba | 1 October 1994 (aged 19) | | (Gabon) Sapins |
| | MF | Franck Engonga | 26 July 1993 (aged 20) | | (Gabon) CF Mounana |
| | MF | Tchen Kabi | 27 April 1986 (aged 27) | | (Gabon) Missile |
| | MF | Knox Younga | 27 April 1994 (aged 19) | | (Gabon) CF Mounana |
| | MF | Thérence Wombo Biteghe | 19 June 1986 (aged 27) | | (Gabon) Missile |
| | MF | Cédric Ondo Biyoghé | 17 August 1994 (aged 19) | | (Gabon) CMS Libreville |
| | MF | Lionel Yakouya | 12 July 1990 (aged 23) | | (Gabon) Bitam |
| | MF | Davy Mayoungou | 27 October 1993 (aged 20) | | (Gabon) CF Mounana |
| | MF | Patrice Kouakou | 24 April 1985 (aged 28) | | (Gabon) Sapins |
| | MF | Étienne Alain Djissikadié | 5 January 1977 (aged 36) | | (Gabon) CF Mounana |
| | MF | Samson Mbingui | 9 February 1992 (aged 21) | | (Gabon) MangaSport |
| | FW | Daniel Cousin | 7 February 1977 (aged 36) | | (Gabon) Sapins |
| | FW | Romuald Ntsitsigui | 8 April 1991 (aged 22) | | (Gabon) MangaSport |
| | FW | Duval N'Zembi | 13 October 1988 (aged 25) | | (Gabon) Missile |
| | FW | Bonaventure Sokambi | 29 January 1991 (aged 22) | | (Gabon) CF Mounana |

== Group B ==
=== Central African Republic ===
Coach: Etienne Momokoamas

| No. | Pos. | Player | Date of birth (age) | Caps | Club |
|---|---|---|---|---|---|
| | GK | Elvis Samolah | 13 May 1994 (aged 19) | | (Central African Republic) Espérance |
| | DF | Audin Boutou | 23 December 1988 (aged 24) | | (Central African Republic) DFC8 |
| | DF | Robert Mbahim | 20 January 1992 (aged 21) | | (Central African Republic) |
| | DF | Acquis Mangou | 5 October 1981 (aged 32) | | (Central African Republic) DFC8 |
| | DF | Kongorako | | | (Central African Republic) Olympic Real |
| | DF | Parfait Tamboulas | 29 April 1995 (aged 18) | | (Central African Republic) Olympic Real |
| | MF | Junior Gourrier | 23 April 1992 (aged 21) | | (Central African Republic) DFC8 |
| | MF | Brice Zimbori | 22 May 1989 (aged 24) | | (Cameroon) Coton Sport |
| | MF | Gervais Kago | 19 December 1987 (aged 25) | | (Gabon) US Bitam |
| | MF | Trésor Toropité | 31 July 1994 (aged 19) | | (Central African Republic) DFC8 |
| | MF | Ulrich Guenzé | 4 December 1990 (aged 23) | | (Central African Republic) Olympic Real |
| | FW | Charlie Dopékoulouyen | 10 February 1985 (aged 28) | | (Gabon) US Bitam |
| | FW | Moussa Limane | 7 July 1992 (aged 21) | | (Sudan) Al-Ahli Shendi |
| | FW | Nicaise Kelebona | 2 February 1995 (aged 18) | | (Central African Republic) Olympic Real |
| | FW | Boris Sandjo | 22 May 1987 (aged 26) | | Unattached |
| | FW | David Bida | 28 March 1994 (aged 19) | | (Central African Republic) DFC8 |
| | FW | Gérard Baniguida | 13 February 1981 (aged 32) | | (Central African Republic) Olympic Real |

=== Chad ===
Coach: Modou Kouta

| No. | Pos. | Player | Date of birth (age) | Caps | Club |
|---|---|---|---|---|---|
| 1 | GK | Mbairamadji Dillah | 18 September 1985 (aged 28) | | (Chad) Tourbillon FC |
| 14 | DF | Constant Madtoingué | 23 September 1994 (aged 19) | | (Chad) AS CotonTchad |
| | DF | Armand Djérabé | 11 September 1980 (aged 33) | | (Chad) Foullah Edifice |
| | DF | Sylvain Ndoubam | 14 March 1987 (aged 26) | | (Chad) Renaissance FC |
| | DF | Morgan Betorangal | 25 August 1988 (aged 25) | | (Luxembourg) F91 Dudelange |
| | DF | Moussa Docteur Bagai | 22 August 1995 (aged 18) | | (Chad) Renaissance FC |
| | DF | Cesar Abaya | 12 October 1984 (aged 29) | | (Chad) Renaissance FC |
| | DF | Hassan Hissein | 20 May 1992 (aged 21) | | (Nigeria) El-Kanemi Warriors |
| | MF | Nassar Koulelengar | 5 October 1995 (aged 18) | | (Chad) Renaissance FC |
| 2 | MF | Leger Djime | 2 October 1987 (aged 26) | | (Morocco) Difaa El Jadida |
| 17 | MF | Ferdinand Gassina | 13 November 1992 (aged 21) | | (Gabon) MangaSport |
| | MF | Herman Doumnan | 25 September 1984 (aged 29) | | (Chad) Gazelle FC |
| | MF | Hilaire Kedigui | 19 September 1985 (aged 28) | | (Chad) Gazelle FC |
| 9 | FW | Karl Max Barthelemy | 27 October 1986 (aged 27) | | (Gabon) CF Mounana |
| | FW | Hassan Boudina Minandi | 23 January 1990 (aged 23) | | (Chad) Foullah Edifice |
| 11 | FW | Rodrigue Ninga | 17 May 1993 (aged 20) | | (Chad) Renaissance FC |

=== Republic of the Congo ===
Coach: Barthélémy Ngatsono

| No. | Pos. | Player | Date of birth (age) | Caps | Club |
|---|---|---|---|---|---|
| | GK | Gildas Kiwoko Mouyabi | 29 October 1981 (aged 32) | | (Republic of the Congo) AC Léopards |
| | DF | Childran Djodjo Miangounina | 16 February 1979 (aged 34) | | (Republic of the Congo) AC Léopards |
| | DF | Ulrich Nzamba | 15 August 1985 (aged 28) | | (Republic of the Congo) AC Léopards |
| | DF | Boris Moubhio Ngonga | 25 October 1988 (aged 25) | | (Republic of the Congo) AC Léopards |
| | DF | Dimitri Bissiki | 17 March 1991 (aged 22) | | (Republic of the Congo) AC Léopards |
| | DF | Dua Ankira | 4 December 1994 (aged 19) | | (Republic of the Congo) Diables Noirs |
| | DF | Hermann Nkodia | 7 July 1988 (aged 25) | | (Republic of the Congo) AC Léopards |
| | DF | Kevine Andzouana | 15 November 1982 (aged 31) | | (Republic of the Congo) Diables Noirs |
| | MF | Chardin Madila | 15 April 1990 (aged 23) | | (Republic of the Congo) AC Léopards |
| | MF | Césaire Gandzé | 6 March 1989 (aged 24) | | (Republic of the Congo) AC Léopards |
| | MF | Hardy Binguila | 17 July 1996 (aged 17) | | (Republic of the Congo) Diables Noirs |
| | MF | Moïse Nkounkou | 2 August 1996 (aged 17) | | (Republic of the Congo) Étoile du Congo |
| | MF | Prestone Lakolo | 13 April 1989 (aged 24) | | (Republic of the Congo) AC Léopards |
| | FW | Rudy Guélor Bhebey-Ndey | 9 March 1986 (aged 27) | | (Republic of the Congo) AC Léopards |
| | FW | Lorry Nkolo | 22 June 1991 (aged 22) | | (Republic of the Congo) Diables Noirs |
| | FW | Junior Makiesse | 12 June 1993 (aged 20) | | (Republic of the Congo) AC Léopards |
| | FW | Glen Kinfounia | 2 August 1990 (aged 23) | | (Republic of the Congo) Diables Noirs |
| | FW | Silvère Ganvoula | 22 June 1996 (aged 17) | | (Republic of the Congo) Patronage Sainte-Anne |
| | FW | Bersyl Obassi | 29 March 1996 (aged 17) | | (Republic of the Congo) ACNFF |
