= List of football clubs in Gabon =

The following is an incomplete list of association football clubs based in Gabon. For a complete list see Category:Football clubs in Gabon

== A ==
- AS Mangasport (Moanda)
- ASCM Moanda
- AS Pélican (Lambaréné)
- AS Stade Mandji

== C ==
- Cercle Mbéri Sportif

== D ==
- En Avant Estuaire FC

== F ==
- FC 105

== M ==
- Missile FC

== S ==
- Srauj Mali
- Sapins FC
- Sogéa FC
- Stade d'Akébé
- Stade Mandji
- Stade Migoveen

== U ==
- US Bitam
- US Oyem
- US O’Mbilia Nzami

== V ==
- VAC Mouila
