= 2011–12 Gabon Championnat National D1 =

Gabon Championnat National D1
- Season: 2011–12
- Champions: CF Mounana
- Champions League: CF Mounana
- Confederation Cup: US Bitam

This pages summarizes the results of the 2011-12 season of Gabon Championnat National D1, the top tier of football in Gabon. Fourteen clubs contested the trophy, and the championship winner was CF Mounana.

== League table ==
Pos	Team	Pld	W	D	L	GF	GA	GD	Pts	Qualification or relegation
1	CF Mounana (C)	26	17	6	3	40	20	+20	57	2013 CAF Champions League
2	US Bitam	26	14	8	4	30	19	+11	50	2013 CAF Confederation Cup
3	Mangasport	26	13	8	5	40	22	+18	47	
4	AS Pélican	26	12	9	5	27	17	+10	45	
5	Missile FC	26	13	5	8	42	26	+16	44	
6	Sapins FC	26	12	4	10	34	24	+10	40	
7	Union Sportive d'Oyem	26	10	8	8	31	26	+5	38	
8	O'Mbilia Nzami	26	10	5	11	28	26	+2	35	
9	Cercle Mbéri Sportif	26	7	9	10	31	34	−3	30	
10	AS Solidarité	26	6	10	10	30	34	−4	28	
11	Racing Club de Masuku	26	6	6	14	33	57	−24	24	
12	Sogéa FC	26	5	7	14	25	38	−13	22	
13	AS Stade Mandji (R)	26	4	8	14	23	42	−19	20	Relegation to Gabon Championnat National D2
14	FC 105 Libreville (R)	26	5	3	18	21	50	−29	18	Relegation to Gabon Championnat National D2

Updated to match(es) played on unknown. Source:
(C) Champions; (R) Relegated
