= 2012–13 Gabon Championnat National D1 =

Gabon Championnat National D1
- Season: 2012–13

This pages summarizes the results of the 2012–13 season of Gabon Championnat National D1, the top football league in Gabon.

Racing Club de Masuku was renamed to AC Bongoville, and was relocated from Libreville to Bongoville.

== League table ==
Pos	Team	Pld	W	D	L	GF	GA	GD	Pts	Qualification or relegation
1	US Bitam (C)	26	17	6	3	41	18	+23	57	2014 CAF Champions League
2	CF Mounana	26	13	8	5	37	20	+17	47	
3	AS Mangasport	26	12	8	6	30	21	+9	44	
4	US Oyem	26	13	4	9	28	28	0	43	
5	Cercle Mbéri Sportif	26	9	12	5	29	23	+6	39	
6	AS Pélican	26	10	9	7	24	18	+6	39	
7	Sapins FC	26	9	10	7	25	23	+2	37	
8	Missile FC	26	9	8	9	21	20	+1	35	
9	AC Bongoville	26	9	6	11	25	29	−4	33	
10	Sogéa FC	26	7	9	10	16	19	−3	30	
11	O'Mbilia Nzami	26	7	7	12	27	34	−7	28	
12	AS Solidarité	26	5	9	12	24	32	−8	24	
13	Nguen'Asuku FC (R)	26	6	5	15	20	39	−19	23	Relegation to Gabon Championnat National D2
14	Stade Migovéen (R)	26	2	7	17	17	40	−23	13	Relegation to Gabon Championnat National D2

Updated to match(es) played on unknown. Source:
(C) Champions; (R) Relegated
