= Guélor Kanga =

Gabonese footballer (born 1990)

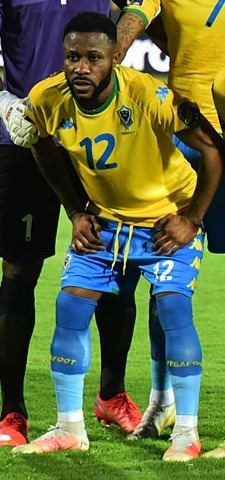
- Kanga with Gabon at the 2021 Africa Cup of Nations

Personal information
- Full name: Guélor Kanga Kaku
- Date of birth: 1 September 1990 (age 36)
- Place of birth: Oyem, Gabon
- Height: 1.67 m (5 ft 6 in)
- Position: Midfielder

Team information
- Current team: Esenler Erokspor
- Number: 12

Senior career*
Years	Team	Apps	(Gls)
2007–2010	Mangasport	41	(9)
2010–2012	Missile	39	(7)
2012–2013	Mounana	23	(5)
2013–2016	Rostov	70	(7)
2016–2018	Red Star Belgrade	39	(9)
2018–2020	Sparta Prague	69	(28)
2020–2025	Red Star Belgrade	149	(28)
2025–	Esenler Erokspor	34	(6)

International career^{‡}
2012–	Gabon	90	(7)
- * Club domestic league appearances and goals as of 20 September 2026 ‡ National team caps and goals as of 29 September 2026

Guélor Kanga Kaku (born 1 September 1990) is a Gabonese professional footballer who plays as a midfielder for Esenler Erokspor and the Gabon national team.

== Club career ==
=== Early years in Gabon ===
Kanga started playing with AS Mangasport in 2007. Immediately in his first season as a senior at the club, he won the Gabon Championnat National D1. In the following seasons Mangasport finished third in 2008–09 and second in 2009–10. After three seasons at Mangasport, in 2010 he moved to Missile FC and took a part in the 2010–11 championship winning campaign. However, the following season they failed to achieve the same goal and finished 5th. In the 2012–13 season Mounana won the Coupe du Gabon Interclubs, a title Manga was still missing among the domestic ones.

=== Rostov ===
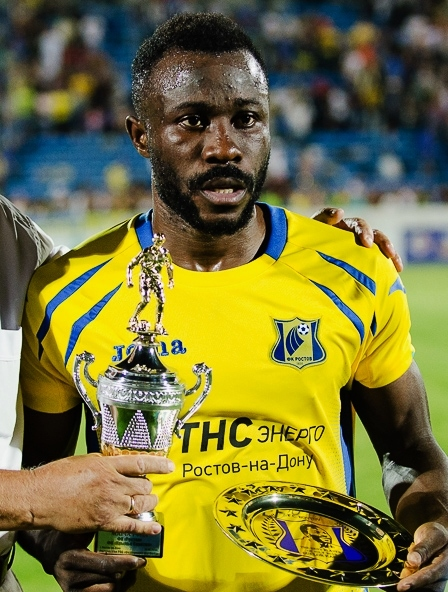
Kanga with FC Rostov in 2015

On 9 February 2013, Kanga signed a 3.5-year deal with Russian Premier League side FC Rostov. Kanga made his debut in the Russian Premier League on 9 March 2013 for Rostov against lania Vladikavkaz.

Kanga received a three match ban in December 2014 after being sent-off for Rostov against Spartak Moscow for responding to racist abuse from the Spartak fans with an obscene gesture.

During the four seasons Kanga spent at Rostov, he made 70 appearances in the Russian Premier League and scored on seven occasions. The first three seasons Rostov performed mostly mid-table however in his last season there the club finished second. By then Kanga became the main target of Miodrag Božović who had coached him at Rostov between 2012 and 2014 and was now at Serbian side Red Star Belgrade who had won the championship and were reinforcing the team for their 2016–17 UEFA Champions League campaign.

=== Red Star Belgrade ===
On 1 July 2016, Kanga signed a two-year deal with Red Star Belgrade. Kanga was Miodrag Božović's transfer wish for Red Star's upcoming Champions League campaign, as Kanga and Božović had known each other over two years at Rostov. Kanga was the first Gabonese footballer in 33 years to play on Serbian soil, as the previous one was actually the first ever footballer from Africa to play in Yugoslav First League, Gabonese international Anselme Delicat, who in 1983 debuted for Serbian club FK Vojvodina. He opened way for numerous players from other African countries that came after him to the region.

Kanga made his debut in an official match for Red Star on 12 July 2016, as a starter in the first leg of the second qualifying round of the 2016–17 UEFA Champions League against Maltese side Valletta away. Red Star won 2–1, and he assisted teammate Aleksandar Katai for the equaliser. Kanga scored his first goal for Red Star in the first leg of the third qualifying round against Ludogorets in Razgrad after a "parabola" shot from distance. Three days later, he made his SuperLiga debut in a win against Metalac.

=== Sparta Prague ===
Kanga was transferred to Czech team Sparta Prague on 2 February 2018 for an undisclosed fee. He scored 15 league goals from well executed penalties, another 13 from game.

=== Red Star Belgrade ===
On 31 July 2020, Kanga signed a three-year deal with Red Star Belgrade.

== International career ==
Since his debut in 2012, Kanga has been a regular at Gabon national team. He was selected for the Gabon team at the 2015 Africa Cup of Nations and played all three games in the group.

He was called up to the Gabon squad to play in the 2017 Africa Cup of Nations of which Gabon were the hosts. Kanga featured for Gabon in the Africa Cup of Nations 2021 tournament in Cameroon.

== Personal life ==
In December 2021, Guélor Kanga acquired Serbian citizenship.

=== Controversy ===
In April 2021, the Congolese Association Football Federation submitted a lawsuit against the country of Gabon for falsification of Kanga's identity. They claim that Kanga was born in Congo and is in fact four years older than the Gabonese birth certificate shows and that his birth name is Kiaku-Kiaku Kianga; allegedly, the Gabonese authorities gave him Gabonese citizenship with a new falsified birth certificate. Additionally, in May 2021, it was reported that the CAF began investigating after there were allegations that his mother died in 1986, despite his registered date of birth which is September 1990.

== Career statistics ==
=== Club ===
As of match played 20 September 2026

Appearances and goals by club, season and competition
Club	Season	League			National cup (Note: Includes Russian Cup, Serbian Cup, Czech Cup)		Continental		Other		Total	
Club	Season	Division	Apps	Goals	Apps	Goals	Apps	Goals	Apps	Goals	Apps	Goals
Rostov	2012–13	Russian Premier League	10	1	2	0	—		1 (Note: Appearance(s) in Russian Premier League relegation play-offs)	1	13	2
Rostov	2013–14	Russian Premier League	24	3	3	0	—		—		27	3
Rostov	2014–15	Russian Premier League	19	1	1	0	2 (Note: Appearances in UEFA Europa League)	0	3	0	25	1
Rostov	2015–16	Russian Premier League	17	2	0	0	—		—		17	2
Rostov	Total		70	7	6	0	2	0	4	1	82	8
Red Star Belgrade	2016–17	Serbian SuperLiga	25	6	4	1	4 (Note: Appearances in UEFA Champions League)	1	—		33	8
Red Star Belgrade	2017–18	Serbian SuperLiga	14	3	0	0	12	2	—		26	5
Red Star Belgrade	Total		39	9	4	1	16	3	—		59	13
Sparta Prague	2017–18	Czech First League	14	4	—		—		—		14	4
Sparta Prague	2018–19	Czech First League	24	12	4	0	2	0	—		30	12
Sparta Prague	2019–20	Czech First League	31	12	4	2	2	1	—		37	15
Sparta Prague	Total		69	28	8	2	4	1	—		81	31
Red Star Belgrade	2020–21	Serbian SuperLiga	26	6	2	0	9 (Note: Three appearances in UEFA Champions League, six appearances and two goals in UEFA Europa League)	2	—		37	8
Red Star Belgrade	2021–22	Serbian SuperLiga	31	2	4	0	13 (Note: Three appearances in UEFA Champions League, ten appearances and one goal in UEFA Europa League)	1	—		48	3
Red Star Belgrade	2022–23	Serbian SuperLiga	30	10	3	1	10 (Note: Four appearances and two goals in UEFA Champions League, six appearances and three goals in UEFA Europa League)	5	—		43	16
Red Star Belgrade	2023–24	Serbian SuperLiga	31	9	2	0	3	0	—		36	9
Red Star Belgrade	2024–25	Serbian SuperLiga	31	1	4	0	5	1	—		40	2
Red Star Belgrade	Total		149	28	15	1	40	9	—		204	38
Esenler Erokspor	2025–26	TFF 1. Lig	30	6	0	0	—		1 (Note: Appearance in promotion play-offs)	0	31	6
Esenler Erokspor	2026–27	TFF 1. Lig	4	0	0	0	—		—		4	0
Esenler Erokspor	Total		34	6	0	0	—		1	0	35	6
Career total			361	78	33	4	62	13	5	1	461	96

=== International ===
As of match played 29 September 2026

Appearances and goals by national team and year
National team	Year	Apps	Goals
Gabon	2012	5	0
Gabon	2013	5	0
Gabon	2014	3	0
Gabon	2015	11	1
Gabon	2016	7	1
Gabon	2017	4	0
Gabon	2018	3	0
Gabon	2019	3	0
Gabon	2020	3	0
Gabon	2021	7	0
Gabon	2022	9	0
Gabon	2023	6	1
Gabon	2024	8	1
Gabon	2025	10	2
Gabon	2026	4	1
Total		90	7

As of match played 30 March 2026

Scores and results list Gabon's goal tally first, score column indicates score after each Kanga goal.

List of international goals scored by Guélor Kanga
No.	Date	Venue	Opponent	Score	Result	Competition
1	9 October 2015	Limbe Stadium, Limbé, Cameroon	Cameroon	1–1	2–1	Friendly
2	6 September 2016	Hammadi Agrebi Stadium, Tunis, Tunisia	Tunisia	3–3	3–3	Friendly
3	16 November 2023	Stade de Franceville, Franceville, Gabon	Kenya	2–1	2–1	2026 FIFA World Cup qualification
4	18 November 2024	Orlando Stadium, Johannesburg, South Africa	Central African Republic	1–0	1–0	2025 Africa Cup of Nations qualification
5	6 June 2025	Stade Général Seyni Kountché, Niamey, Niger	Niger	3–4	3–4	Friendly
6	31 December 2025	Marrakesh Stadium, Marrakesh, Morocco	Ivory Coast	1–0	2–3	2025 Africa Cup of Nations
7	30 March 2026	Pakhtakor Central Stadium, Tashkent, Uzbekistan	Trinidad and Tobago	1–0	2–2 (3–2 p)	2026 FIFA Series

== Honours ==
Mangasport

- Gabon Championnat National D1: 2007–08

Missile

- Gabon Championnat National D1: 2010–11

Mounana

- Coupe du Gabon Interclubs: 2013

Rostov

- Russian Cup: 2013–14

Red Star Belgrade

- Serbian SuperLiga: 2017–18, 2020–21, 2021–22, 2022–23, 2023–24, 2024–25
- Serbian Cup: 2020–21, 2021–22, 2022–23, 2023–24

Sparta Prague

- Czech Cup: 2019–20

Individual

- Serbian SuperLiga Team of the Season: 2022–23
