= Beni Kiendé =

Gabonese footballer (born 1986)

Personal information
- Full name: Beni Popaul Kiendé Lendoye
- Date of birth: 4 May 1986 (age 40)
- Place of birth: Gabon
- Height: 1.85 m (6 ft 1 in)
- Position: Midfielder

Team information
- Current team: Missile FC

Senior career*
| Years | Team | Apps | (Gls) |
| 2006–2008 | Mangasport Moanda | | |
| 2008–2010 | Makedonija GP | 11 | (0) |
| 2010 | Pélican Lambaréné | | |
| 2011– | Missile Libreville | | |

International career^{‡}
| 2007– | Gabon | 2 | (2) |
- * Club domestic league appearances and goals as of 1 April 2011 ‡ National team caps and goals as of 1 April 2011

Beni Popaul Kiendé Lendoye (born 4 May 1986) is a Gabonese international football midfielder playing with Missile FC Libreville.

== Career ==
Kiendé was playing with AS Mangasport in Gabon where he won one national championship before moving to the Republic of Macedonia in December 2008 and signing with Macedonian First League club FK Makedonija Gjorče Petrov. In Makedonia GP he played alongside his national team teammate Georges Ambourouet. He left Macedonia at the end of the 2009–10 season returning to Gabon where he played with AS Pélican until January 2011 when he moved to another Gabon Championnat National D1 club, Missile FC.

== National team ==
He is part of the Gabonese national team since 2007 having played 2 matches that year. More recently, he has been part of the Gabonese team represented at the 2011 African Nations Championship having played in one group match against Algeria and with a subsequent elimination of Gabon in the group stage.

=== International goals ===
Scores and results list Gabon's goal tally first.

| No | Date | Venue | Opponent | Score | Result | Competition |
|---|---|---|---|---|---|---|
| 1. | 12 June 2007 | Stade Paul Julius Bénard, Saint-Paul, Réunion | Réunion | 1–0 | 3–0 | Friendly |
| 2. | 12 June 2007 | Stade Paul Julius Bénard, Saint-Paul, Réunion | Réunion | 2–0 | 3–0 | Friendly |

== External sources ==
- Beni Popaul Kiendé at National-Football-Teams.com
