= Yves Bitséki Moto =

Gabonese footballer

Personal information
- Full name: Yves Stéphane Bitséki Moto
- Date of birth: April 23, 1983 (age 43)
- Place of birth: Bitam, Gabon
- Height: 1.86 m (6 ft 1 in)
- Position: Goalkeeper

Team information
- Current team: Masters Football Malta

Senior career*
Years	Team	Apps	(Gls)
2006–2007	Bitam		
2007–2009	Mangasport		
2009–2015	Bitam		
2015–2019	Mounana		
2019–2021	Mosta	8	(0)
2022–2023	AS Pélican		
2023	Lambaréné AC		
2025–	Masters Football Malta		

International career^{‡}
2010–2020	Gabon	31	(1)
- * Club domestic league appearances and goals ‡ National team caps and goals as of 15 November 2017

Yves Stéphane Bitséki Moto (born 23 April 1983) is a Gabonese footballer who plays as a goalkeeper for Masters Football Malta.

== International career ==
Moto was first called up to represent Gabon during the 2010 Africa Cup of Nations but he did not make his debut until the 0–0 friendly draw against Burkina Faso on 9 January 2012 as he was often second-choice behind Didier Ovono. He was then called up to represent Gabon at the 2012 Africa Cup of Nations but again he did not play. He did however play at the 2013 CEMAC Cup, which he won with Gabon, and the 2014 African Nations Championship.

He scored his only goal for Gabon on 8 September 2015 during the 1–1 draw against Zambia, and he continued to represent Gabon until after the 2018 FIFA World Cup qualification. He was last called up to the squad for the pair of 2021 Africa Cup of Nations qualifying matches against Gambia in November 2020.

== Career statistics ==
=== International ===
Appearances and goals by national team and year
National team	Year	Apps	Goals
Gabon	2010	0	0
Gabon	2011	0	0
Gabon	2012	3	0
Gabon	2013	6	0
Gabon	2014	7	0
Gabon	2015	4	1
Gabon	2016	5	0
Gabon	2017	6	0
Gabon	2018	0	0
Gabon	2019	0	0
Gabon	2020	0	0
Total		31	1

Scores and results list Gabon's goal tally first.

No	Date	Venue	Opponent	Score	Result	Competition
1.	8 September 2015	National Heroes Stadium, Lusaka, Zambia	Zambia	1–1	1–1	Friendly

== Honours ==
Mangasport

- Gabon Championnat National D1: 2007–08; third place 2008–09
- Coupe du Gabon Interclubs: runner-up 2008

Bitam

- Gabon Championnat National D1: 2009–10, 2012–13; runner-up 2011–12; third place 2013–14
- Coupe du Gabon Interclubs: 2010; runner-up 2013

Mounana

- Gabon Championnat National D1: 2015–16, 2016–17
- Coupe du Gabon Interclubs: 2016

Gabon

- CEMAC Cup: 2013
