= Cédric Moubamba =

Gabonese footballer

Carlos Cedric Moubamba Saib (born 14 October 1979) is a Gabonese former professional footballer who played as a midfielder.

== Club career ==
Moubamba played previously for AC Bongoville, US Bitam, Sogéa, USM Libreville and AS Mangasport. He also played for Omani club Dhofar S.C.S.C. with his national team members Etienne Bito'o and Congolese Sita Milandou and DR Congo based Champion TP Mazembe.

== International career ==
Moubamba was a regular member of the Gabon national team and played 76 games scoring three goals.

== Career statistics ==
Scores and results list Gabon's goal tally first, score column indicates score after each Moubamba goal.

List of international goals scored by Cédric Moubamba
No.	Date	Venue	Opponent	Score	Result	Competition	Ref.
1	7 October 2000	Stade El Menzah, Tunis, Tunisia	Tunisia		2–4	2002 African Cup of Nations qualification	
2	13 June 2003	Estadi Comunal, Andorra la Vella, Andorra	Andorra		2–2	Friendly	
3	24 September 2003	Stade du 5 Juillet, Algiers, Algeria	Algeria		2–2	Friendly	
