= Théodore Nzue Nguema =

Gabonese footballer (1973–2022)

Théodore Zué Nguema
Personal information
- Birth name: Teodoro Nsue Nguema Nchama (Note: This name uses Fang people from Equatorial Guinea naming customs: his surname is Nsue , his father's surname is Nguema and his mother's surname is Nchama. The surnames are chosen by their respective parents.)
- Date of birth: 9 November 1973
- Place of birth: Mongomo, Equatorial Guinea
- Date of death: 5 May 2022 (aged 48)
- Place of death: Bata, Equatorial Guinea
- Position: Striker

Senior career*
Years	Team	Apps	(Gls)
1990	Santé Sports d'Oyem		
1991–1995	USM Libreville		
1996–1997	Mbilinga FC		
1997–1998	Angers	28	(4)
1998–1999	ES Zarzis		
1999–2001	Braga	8	(0)
2001–2004	Libreville		
2004–2007	Téléstar		

International career
1995–2005	Gabon	77	(23)

Managerial career
- 2012: Real Castel
- 2015–2019: AD Mongomo / Futuro Kings
- * Club domestic league appearances and goals

Théodore Zué Nguema (9 November 1973 – 5 May 2022) was a professional football player and manager. He played as a striker. Born in Equatorial Guinea, he played for the Gabon national team between 1995 and 2005, scoring 23 goals in 77 appearances.

== Club career ==
Originally from Mongomo, Equatorial Guinea, Nguema moved to Oyem, Gabon (37km east of Mongomo) and began playing football in local club Santé Sports d'Oyem. He later played for fellow Gabonese sides USM Libreville and Mbilinga FC, for Angers SCO in France, for ES Zarzis in Tunisia, for S.C. Braga in Portugal and for FC 105 Libreville and Téléstar back in Gabon.

== International career ==
Nguema has also played for Gabon national team and participated at the 2000 African Cup of Nations where they were eliminated in the group stages. He played for the side that finished third at the 2005 CEMAC Cup.

== Managerial career ==
After his playing retirement, Nguema returned to Mongomo and managed Real Castel and Estrellas del Futuro (later known as Futuro Kings FC).

== Death ==
Nguema died on 5 May 2022 in Bata, Equatorial Guinea.

== Career statistics ==
Scores and results list Gabon's goal tally first, score column indicates score after each Nguema goal.

List of international goals scored by Théodore Nzue Nguema
No.	Date	Venue	Opponent	Score	Result	Competition	Ref.
1	10 November 1996	Stade Omar Bongo, Libreville, Gabon	Ghana	1–0	1–1	1998 FIFA World Cup qualification	
2	13 July 1997	Stade Omar Bongo, Libreville, Gabon	Kenya	1–0	1–0	1998 African Cup of Nations qualification	
3	2 August 1998	Estádio Patrice Lumumba, Munenga, Angola	Equatorial Guinea	2–0	2–0	2000 African Cup of Nations qualification	
4	16 August 1998	Stade d'Angondjé, Libreville, Gabon	Equatorial Guinea	3–0	3–0	2000 African Cup of Nations qualification	
5	20 February 1999	Stade Omar Bongo, Libreville, Gabon	Burkina Faso	1–0	1–1	Friendly	
6	27 February 1999	Odi Stadium, Mabopane, South Africa	South Africa	1–0	1–4	2000 African Cup of Nations qualification	
7	6 June 1999	Stade Omar Bongo, Libreville, Gabon	Angola	1–0	3–1	2000 African Cup of Nations qualification	
8	6 June 1999	Stade Omar Bongo, Libreville, Gabon	Angola	2–0	3–1	2000 African Cup of Nations qualification	
9	20 June 1999	Les Avirons, Réunion	Mauritius	2–1	2–2	2000 African Cup of Nations qualification	
10	7 November 1999	Stade Omar Bongo, Libreville, Gabon	Equatorial Guinea	4–0	4–0	Friendly	
11	28 November 1999	Stade Omar Bongo, Libreville, Gabon	Burkina Faso	2–0	3–2	Friendly	
12	13 January 2001	Moi International Sports Centre, Kasarani, Kenya	Kenya	1–0	1–2	2002 African Cup of Nations qualification	
13	16 June 2001	Hassan II Stadium, Benslimane, Morocco	Morocco	1–0	1–0	2002 African Cup of Nations qualification	
14	24 September 2003	Stade du 5 Juillet, Algiers, Algeria	Algeria	1–0	2–2	Friendly	
15	26 September 2003	Stade du 5 Juillet, Algiers, Algeria	Benin	3–0	4–0	Friendly	
16	26 September 2003	Stade du 5 Juillet, Algiers, Algeria	Benin	4–0	4–0	Friendly	
17	5 December 2003	Stade Alphonse Massemba-Débat, Brazzaville, Republic of the Congo	Congo	1–1	2–3	2003 CEMAC Cup	
18	5 June 2006	Stade Omar Bongo, Libreville, Gabon	Zimbabwe	1–0	1–1	2006 FIFA World Cup Qualification	
19	19 June 2004	Amahoro Stadium, Kigali, Rwanda	Rwanda	1–1	1–3	2006 FIFA World Cup Qualification	
20	3 July 2004	Stade Omar Bongo, Libreville, Gabon	Angola	2–1	2–2	2006 FIFA World Cup Qualification	
21	3 October 2004	Stade Omar Bongo, Libreville, Gabon	Benin	2–0	2–0	Friendly	
22	3 February 2005	Stade Omar Bongo, Libreville, Gabon	Central African Republic	2–0	4–0	2005 CEMAC Cup	
23	18 June 2005	Stade Omar Bongo, Libreville, Gabon	Rwanda	3–0	3–0	2006 FIFA World Cup Qualification	
