= Thierry Issiémou =

Gabonese footballer

Personal information
- Date of birth: 31 March 1983 (age 43)
- Place of birth: Libreville, Gabon
- Height: 1.79 m (5 ft 10 1/2 in)
- Position: Defensive midfielder

Senior career*
Years	Team	Apps	(Gls)
1999	Stade Mbombey		
2000–2002	TP Akwembé		
2003	FC 105 Libreville		
2003	USM Libreville		
2004–2005	Sogéa FC		
2006–2007	Delta Téléstar		
2007–2008	Debrecen	4	(0)
2008	Vasas SC	1	(0)
2009–2010	US Monastir	13	(0)
2010–2011	EGS Gafsa	6	(0)
2011–2012	JS Saint-Pierroise		
2012–2014	AC Bongoville		

International career^{‡}
2002–2010	Gabon	31	(2)
- * Club domestic league appearances and goals as of 13:50, 11 January 2012 (UTC) ‡ National team caps and goals as of 13:44, 24 December 2011 (UTC)

Thierry Issiémou (born 31 March 1983) is a Gabonese former international footballer who played as a defensive midfielder.

== Career ==
=== Club career ===
Issiémou has played club football in Gabon, Hungary, Poland, Tunisia and Réunion for Stade Mbombey, TP Akwembé, FC 105 Libreville, USM Libreville, Sogéa FC, Delta Téléstar, Debrecen, Vasas SC, Tunisian clubs US Monastir, EGS Gafsa and JS Saint-Pierroise.

In November 2008, signed a preliminary contract with FC Karpaty Lviv, in January 2009, Karpaty refused his services.

=== International career ===
Issiémou made his international debut for Gabon in 2002, and has appeared in FIFA World Cup qualifying matches.
