= Bonaventure Sokambi =

Gabonese footballer

Personal information
- Full name: Tatry Bonaventure Sokambi
- Date of birth: 1 January 1992 (age 34)
- Place of birth: Libreville, Gabon
- Height: 1.77 m (5 ft 10 in)
- Position: Forward

Team information
- Current team: Aigle Royal

Senior career*
Years	Team	Apps	(Gls)
2007–2008	CF Mounana		
2008–2009	Stade Mandji		
2009–2010	Sogéa		
2010–2011	US Bitam		
2011–2015	CF Mounana		
2015–2017	ASO Chlef	9	(1)
2015–2016	→ CR Belouizdad (loan)		
2017–	Aigle Royal	0	(0)

International career^{‡}
2013–	Gabon	10	(2)
- * Club domestic league appearances and goals as of 10 July 2017 (UST) ‡ National team caps and goals as of 10 July 2017 (UST)

Bonaventure Sokambi (born 1 January 1992) is a Gabonese professional footballer who currently plays as a forward for Elite One club Aigle Royal Menoua.

== Career statistics ==
=== International ===
Appearances and goals by national team and year
National team	Year	Apps	Goals
Gabon	2010	1	0
Gabon	2013	5	1
Gabon	2014	7	2
Gabon	2015	1	0
Total		14	3

Scores and results list Gabon's goal tally first, score column indicates score after each Sokambi goal.

List of international goals scored by Bonaventure Sokambi
No.	Date	Venue	Opponent	Score	Result	Competition	Ref.
1	21 December 2013	Stade de Franceville, Franceville, Gabon	Central African Republic	1–0	2–0	2013 CEMAC Cup	
2	22 January 2014	Free State Stadium, Bloemfontein, South Africa	Mauritania	3–2	4–2	2014 African Nations Championship	
3	22 January 2014	Free State Stadium, Bloemfontein, South Africa	Mauritania	4–2	4–2	2014 African Nations Championship	

== Honours ==
CF Mounana

Runner-up

- Gabon Championnat National D1: 2012–13, 2013–14
