= Étienne Alain Djissikadié =

Gabonese footballer

Personal information
- Date of birth: 5 January 1977 (age 49)
- Place of birth: Franceville, Gabon
- Height: 1.70 m (5 ft 7 in)
- Position: Midfielder

Senior career*
Years	Team	Apps	(Gls)
1996–1997	Mbilinga FC		
2001–2003	AS Mangasport		
2004–2006	Sogéa FC		
2007–2008	AS Stade Mandji		
2008–2010	TP Mazembe		
2010–2013	US Bitam		
2013–2014	CF Mounana		

International career
1997–2014	Gabon	54	(4)
- * Club domestic league appearances and goals

Étienne Alain Djissikadié (born 5 January 1977) is a Gabonese former professional footballer who played as an attacking midfielder. He played for the Gabon national team.

== International career ==
Djissikadie was a regular member of Gabon national team squads. He played from 1997 until 2014 in 47 FIFA matched and scored two goals.
