= Georges Ambourouet =

Gabonese international football defender

Personal information
- Date of birth: 1 May 1986 (age 40)
- Place of birth: Libreville, Gabon
- Height: 1.74 m (5 ft 9 in)
- Position: Left back

Team information
- Current team: Lozo Sport

Senior career*
Years	Team	Apps	(Gls)
2001–2003	USM Libreville		
2003–2006	Sedan	26	(1)
2006–2008	Delta Téléstar		
2008–2009	Makedonija Gj. P.	28	(0)
2009	Ceahlăul Piatra Neamţ	7	(0)
2010–2011	Dinamo Tirana	24	(0)
2011	Missile Libreville		
2012	Flamurtari Vlorë	0	(0)
2012	Olympique Khouribga	5	(1)
2013	Kukësi	0	(0)
2013–2014	Mounana		
2015–2016	Akanda		
2016–	Lozo Sport		

International career
2003–2016	Gabon	41	(1)
- * Club domestic league appearances and goals as of 10:53, 2 May 2020 (UTC)

Georges Ambourouet (born 1 May 1986) is a Gabonese professional footballer who plays as a defender for Lozo Sport. Between 2003 and 2016, he made 41 appearances scoring one goal for the Gabon national team.

== Club career ==
Ambourouet was born in Libreville. He started his career in Gabon plying with USM Libreville until 2003 when French club CS Sedan Ardennes signed him. He played with Sedan three seasons, always in Ligue 2 making a total of 26 league appearances scoring once. In 2006, he returned to Gabon and played two seasons with Delta Téléstar Gabon Télécom FC from Libreville. In summer 2008 he moved to Macedonia and signed with FK Makedonija Gjorče Petrov where he won the domestic league. At the winter break of the 2009–10 season he had a short spell with FC Ceahlăul Piatra Neamţ playing in the Romanian Liga I. In summer 2010 he signed with Albanian previous season champions FK Dinamo Tirana. In summer 2011 he was back in Gabon where he played for Missile FC.

He returned to Albania on 28 January 2012, signing for KS Flamurtari Vlorë. In the summer of 2013 he signed for FK Kukësi.

== International career ==
Ambourouet was a regular member of the Gabon national team from 2003 and became one of the most experienced and capped players. He was selected to be part of the Gabon team at the 2010 Africa Cup of Nations.
