= Stéphane N'Guéma =

Gabonese footballer (born 1984)

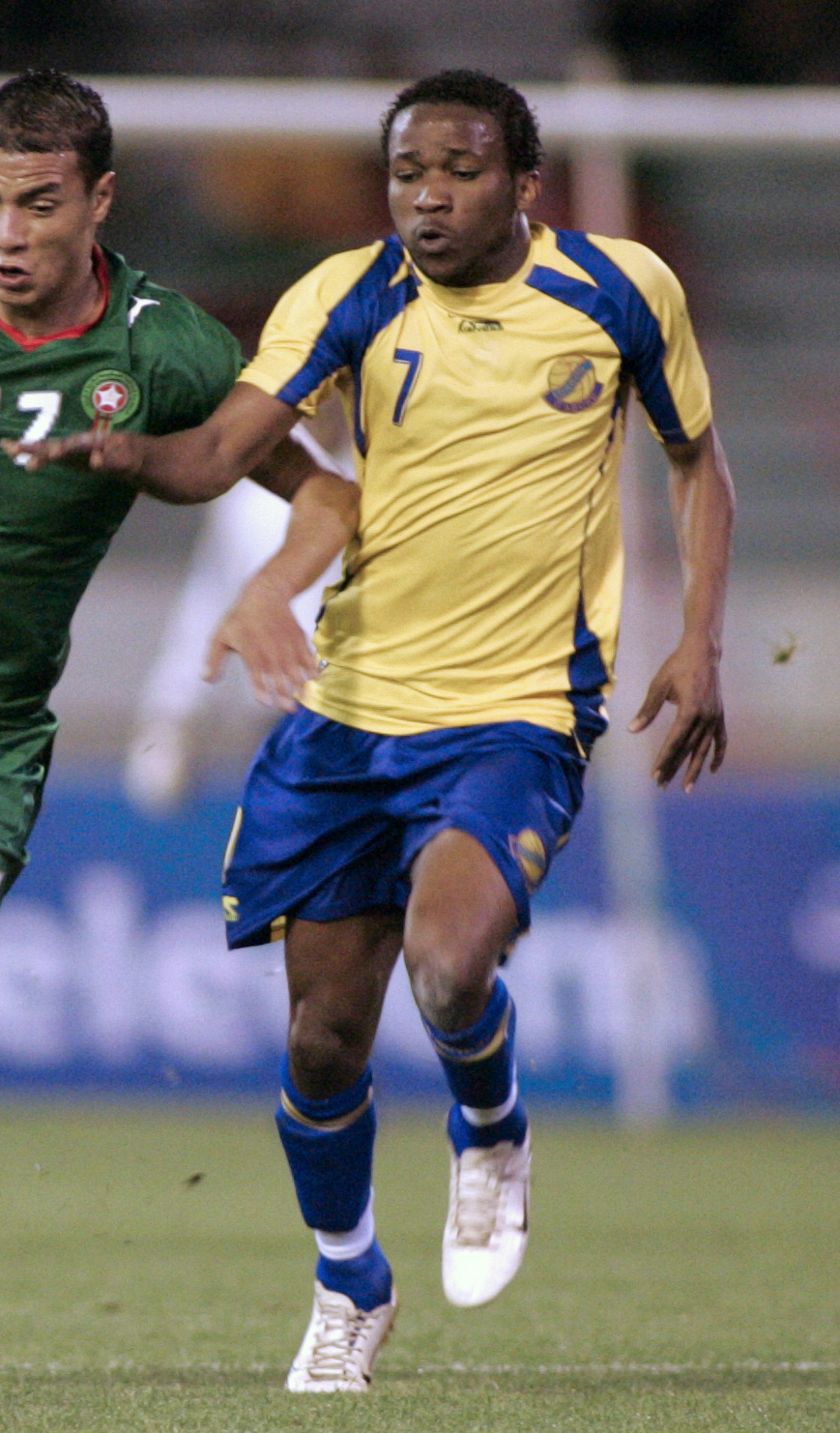

Personal information
- Date of birth: 20 November 1984 (age 41)
- Place of birth: Libreville, Gabon
- Height: 1.74 m (5 ft 8 1/2 in)
- Position: Winger

Senior career*
Years	Team	Apps	(Gls)
2002–2007	Rennes	45	(4)
2004–2005	→ Lorient (loan)	8	(0)
2007–2008	Istres	33	(8)
2008–2009	Paris FC	13	(1)
2009	Olimpia Bălţi	10	(3)
2010	Beauvais	13	(1)
2010–2011	Paris Saint-Germain II	19	(6)
2011–2012	US Bitam	11	(7)
2012–2014	AC Bongoville		
2015	O'MbiliaNzami		
2015–2018	FC 105 Libreville		

International career^{‡}
2002–2013	Gabon	41	(7)
- * Club domestic league appearances and goals as of 16 December 2021 ‡ National team caps and goals as of 16 December 2021

Stéphane N'Guéma (born 20 November 1984) is a former Gabonese football player, who played as a winger.

== Club career ==
Born in Gabon, N'Guéma made his senior debut for Rennes in the 2002–03 Ligue 1 season, after plying his trade for Rennes' reserve side, making a singular appearance in the 2000–01 season. In the 2005–06 season, he was loaned to Ligue 2 side FC Lorient. His contributions in that season helped Lorient to make a return to the top flight after a long spell in the lower leagues. In the 2006–07 season, N'Guéma returned to Rennes, solely playing for their reserve side in the fourth tier, making 15 league appearances.

In 2007, N'Guéma signed for Istres, scoring eight goals in 33 appearances in the Championnat National. The following year, Paris FC signed N'Guéma, before releasing him in February 2009. N'Guéma proceeded to see out the rest of the 2008–09 season with Moldovan club Olimpia Bălţi.

Following the culmination of the 2010 Africa Cup of Nations, N'Guéma signed for Beauvais, scoring twice in 13 appearances in the second half of the 2009–10 Championnat National season. In July 2010, N'Guéma signed for Paris Saint-Germain II, making 19 league appearances, scoring six times.

In 2011, N'Guéma returned to his native Gabon, signing for US Bitam. N'Guéma's seven league goals in 11 appearances helped Bitam finish second in the Gabon Championnat National D1. The following year, N'Guéma signed for AC Bongoville, playing for the club for two seasons. In 2015, after a brief spell at O'MbiliaNzami, N'Guéma signed for FC 105 Libreville, spending three seasons at the club before retiring in 2018.

== International career ==
On 15 November 2003, N'Guéma made his debut for Gabon, scoring twice in a World Cup qualification tie against Burundi. N'Guéma was included in the Gabonese squads for both the 2010 and 2012 Africa Cup of Nations, scoring against Niger in the latter tournament.

=== International goals ===
Scores and results list Gabon's goal tally first.

#	Date	Venue	Opponent	Score	Result	Competition
1	15 November 2003	Stade Omar Bongo, Libreville, Gabon	Burundi	3–0	4–1	2006 FIFA World Cup qualification
2	15 November 2003	Stade Omar Bongo, Libreville, Gabon	Burundi	4–0	4–1	2006 FIFA World Cup qualification
3	14 June 2008	Stade Omar Bongo, Libreville, Gabon	Ghana	2–0	2–0	2010 FIFA World Cup qualification
4	18 November 2008	Stade Paul Cosnys, Compiègne, France	Guinea		3–3	Friendly
5	18 November 2008	Stade Paul Cosnys, Compiègne, France	Guinea		3–3	Friendly
6	9 February 2011	Stade Omar Bongo, Libreville, Gabon	DR Congo	1–0	2–0	Friendly
7	23 January 2012	Stade d'Angondjé, Libreville, Gabon	Niger	2–0	2–0	2012 Africa Cup of Nations

== Post-playing career ==
Following his playing career, N'Guéma stepped into the role of secretary-general at the Gabonese players' union. In November 2021, N'Guéma and four other former Gabonese internationals were arrested "for protesting over the continued cancellation of the domestic leagues". N'Guéma subsequently stepped down as secretary-general.
