= Stéphane Achy =

Gabonese footballer

Personal information
- Full name: Jean Stéphane Achy
- Date of birth: 11 July 1988 (age 38)
- Place of birth: Libreville, Gabon
- Position: Midfielder

Team information
- Current team: Missile

Senior career*
Years	Team	Apps	(Gls)
2004–2005	105 Libreville	–	(–)
2005–2007	Pélican	–	(–)
2007–2010	Mangasport	–	(–)
2010–2011	Pélican	–	(–)
2011–	Missile	–	(–)

International career
2009–	Gabon	1	(0)
- * Club domestic league appearances and goals

Jean Stéphane Achy (born 11 July 1988) is a Gabonese footballer who plays as a midfielder for Missile FC.

== Career ==
He made his debut for the Gabon national team in 2009.
