= Etienne Bito'o =

Gabonese footballer

Personal information
- Full name: Etienne-Panayotis Bito'o
- Date of birth: 5 January 1980 (age 46)
- Place of birth: Lambaréné, Gabon
- Height: 1.75 m (5 ft 9 in)
- Position: Forward

Team information
- Current team: O'Mbilia Nzami
- Number: 19

Youth career
- –1999: USM Libreville

Senior career*
Years	Team	Apps	(Gls)
1999–2000	AS Mangasport		
2001–2002	FC 105 Libreville	27	(1)
2002–2003	Gil Vicente F.C.	11	(0)
2003–2005	Wits University FC	26	(5)
2005–2007	FC 105 Libreville	1	(0)
2007–2009	FC Zestaponi	20	(3)
2009–2010	Dhofar F.C.		
2011	Al-Nasr Salalah		
2011–2012	Missile FC		
2012–	O'Mbilia Nzami		

International career
2000–2004	Gabon	13	(9)
- * Club domestic league appearances and goals as of 1 August 2007

Etienne-Panayotis Bito'o (born 5 January 1980 in Lambaréné) is a Gabonese footballer, who is currently playing for US O'Mbilia Nzami.

== Career ==
In December 2007 he signed a 2-year contract with Georgian side Zestaponi. The offensive midfielder recently playing for Omani clubs, Dhofar F.C. and Al-Nasr (Salalah).

=== International ===
He is a member of the Gabon national football team, he represented his homeland at the 2002 African Cup of Nations in Mali.

In 2010 Bito'o was called up for Gabon for friendly matches against Oman and Saudi Arabia.
