= Luc Eymael =

Belgian football manager and former player

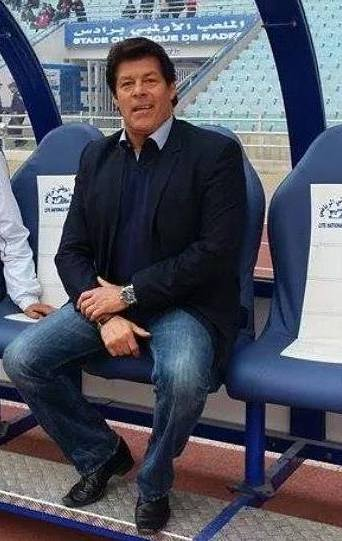
- Eymael as manager of JS Kairouan in 2015

Personal information
- Date of birth: 20 September 1959 (age 67)
- Place of birth: Tongeren, Belgium
- Height: 1.80 m (5 ft 11 in)
- Position: Goalkeeper

Senior career*
Years	Team	Apps	(Gls)
1975–1980	Royal Star Fléron	143	(0)
1981–1982	Royale Union Sportive Ferrières	35	(0)
1983–1985	Sporting Heerlen	60	(0)
1985–1990	Racing Club Vaux	175	(0)
1990–1992	Royal Football Club Huy	63	(0)
1992–1995	R.E. Virton	124	(0)
1995–1996	K.S.C. Hasselt	32	(0)
1996–1997	UR Namur	34	(0)
1998–1999	Royal Sporting Club Athusien	30	(0)
1999–2000	Royal Football Club Aubel	33	(0)
Total		729	(0)

Managerial career
- 1999–2003: RUS Sartoise
- 2003–2004: Weywertz
- 2004–2007: Jeunesse Lorraine Arlonaise
- 2007–2009: RFC Spy
- 2009–2010: Royal Racing Club Hamoir
- 2010–2011: AS Vita
- 2011–2012: Missile
- 2012: MC Oran
- 2013: A.F.C. Leopards
- 2014: Rayon Sports
- 2014–2015: JS Kairouan
- 2015: Al-Nasr
- 2015–2016: Al-Merrikh
- 2016–2017: Polokwane City
- 2017–2018: Free State Stars
- 2018–2019: Tala'ea El Gaish
- 2019–2020: Black Leopards
- 2020: Young Africans
- 2021: Stade Tunisien
- 2022: Ittihad Misurata
- 2024-2024: Aigles du Congo
- 2024-2025: Saint-Éloi Lupopo
- 2025: Chippa United FC
- 2026: JS Kairouan
- * Club domestic league appearances and goals

Luc Eymael (born 20 September 1959) is a Belgian football manager and former player, and married to Patricia Abbruzzese.

== Playing career ==
Luc began his professional footballing career in 1975 with the Fléron-based Royal Star Fléron Football Club, with whom he participated in the Belgian Fourth Division and later helped in promotion to the Belgian Third Division. In 1981, he moved to Ferrières where he signed a one-year contract with Belgian Third Division club, Royale Union Sportive Ferrières.

He first moved out of Belgium in 1983 to Netherlands where he signed a two-year contract with Heerlen-based, Eerste Divisie club, Sporting Heerlen.

In 1985, he moved back to Belgium to Vaux-sous-Chèvremont where he signed a long-term contract with, along with Belgian Fifth Division club, Racing Club Vaux. In a five-year spell with the club, he helped them in promotion to the Belgian Fourth Division.

In 1990, he signed a two-year contract with Huy-based Belgian Third Division club, Royal Football Club Huy.

In 1992, he moved to Virton where he signed a long-term contract with Belgian Fourth Division club, R.E. Virton. He first helped his team in promotion to the Belgian Third Division and later in promotion to the Belgian Second Division.

He then moved to Hasselt where in 1995, he signed a one-year contract with Belgian Second Division club, K.S.C. Hasselt.

Later, in 1996, he signed a one-year contract with Union Royale Namur Fosses-La-Ville and helped the club win the 1996–97 Belgian Third Division, earning a promotion to the Belgian Second Division.

In 1998, he moved to Athus where he signed a one-year contract with Belgian Fourth Division club, Royal Sporting Club Athusien. Finally, he ended his career as a footballer in the year 2000, playing for a season with another Belgian Fourth Division club, Royal Football Club Aubel.

He has also participated in various international tournaments with the Belgium U-14 side, the Belgium national under-16 football team and the Belgium national Military football team.

After a 9-month break, Luc Eymael is back, and it is with the Libyan club, ittihad misrata premier league, that he signs a new contract on 23 August 2022 for a new challenge whose objective is to participate in the final round of this season to qualify for an African Cup.

Luc Eymael returned to Africa on January 28, 2024, to sign with the new club AIGLES DU CONGO based in Kinshasa in the Democratic Republic of Congo. The club is currently in 4th place in the Champions League and aims to move up to 3rd or 2nd position.

On September 27, 2024, Luc Eymael, with 14 years of international experience, was appointed head of FC Saint Eloi Lupopo, a top club based in Lubumbashi in the Democratic Republic of Congo. He takes charge of the team, replacing Malian Mohamed Magassouba, now the club's technical director. This new challenge in the African Ligue 1 marks an important step in his career.

On August 20, 2025, Luc Eymael joined the "Chilli Boys" by signing with Chippa United FC, a South African Premier League club, thereby continuing his career at the highest level of continental football.

== Managerial career ==
Luc holds the UEFA Pro Licence, the highest football coaching qualification. He received the UEFA Pro Licence in 2007 and the UEFA A License on 10 September 2002, from the Royal Belgian Football Association. He is also a graduate from the Federal School of football coaching of Union Royale Belge Des Sociétés de Football Association (URBSFA). He also holds the CAF A License which he received from the Tunisian Football Federation on 5 February 2015.

He has worked with many of Belgium's current and former footballing stars including Eden Hazard, Axel Witsel, Logan Bailly, Guillaume Gillet, Christian Benteke and François Sterchele.

=== Belgium ===
He began his managerial career in 1999 with Lierneux-based Belgian Fifth Division club, RUS Sartoise. In 2003, he was appointed as the head coach of another Belgian Fifth Division club, Weywertz-based, FC Weywertz. In 2004, he moved to Arlon where he signed a three-year contract with Football Club Jeunesse Lorraine Arlonaise with whom he participated in the Belgian Fourth Division and later helped them get promoted to the Belgian Third Division. Later, in 2007, he moved to Spy where he was appointed as the head coach of Belgian Fourth Division club, RFC Spy on a two-year contract. In 2009, he moved to Hamoir where he worked as the head coach of Belgian Third Division club, Royal Racing Club Hamoir and thus ending his eleven-year long-spell in Belgium as a football manager.

=== AS Vita ===
Eymael first moved out of Belgium as a football manager in 2010 to the Democratic Republic of the Congo, where on 26 August 2010 he was appointed as the head coach of the Linafoot club AS Vita. In his very first season as the head coach of the Kinshasa-based club, he helped them win the 2010 Linafoot. The team finished at the top just above their archrivals, TP Mazembe. Eymael also helped his club win the 2011 Super Coupe du Congo. The Congolese club also reached the Second Round of the 2011 CAF Champions League under his leadership. He maintained an unbeaten 23-games record with the Kinshasa-based club and later resigned from his position by April 2011.

=== Missile ===
In May 2011, he moved to Gabon where on 1 July 2011 he was appointed as the head coach of Gabon Championnat National D1 club, Missile. He helped the Libreville-based club win the 2010–11 Gabon Championnat National D1, which was the first national title won in the history of the club, thus helping them qualify for the 2012 CAF Champions League. He also helped the club reach the First Round of the Round of 16 of the 2011 CAF Confederation Cup where they narrowly lost 0–3 on penalties to Algeria's JS Kabylie after the tie had ended 3–3 on aggregate. In the 2011–12 Gabon Championnat National D1, he helped his team secure the fourth position, thus ending his one-year spell with the Gabonese club. He also helped a number of players from his squad earn caps for the Gabon national football team, one of whom later signed a two-year contract with Russian Football Premier League club, FC Rostov.

=== MC Oran ===
In June 2012, he moved to Algeria where he was appointed as the head coach of Algerian Ligue Professionnelle 1 club, MC Oran on a one-year-term contract. Later, in September 2012, due to some financial delays he decided to part ways with the Oran-based club.

=== A.F.C. Leopards ===
In April 2013, he moved to Kenya where he signed a short-term contract with Kenyan Premier League club, A.F.C. Leopards. He took charge of the club in April 2013 when the club was struggling at the bottom of the table to avoid relegation to the Kenyan National Super League. By August 2014, he had helped the Nairobi-based club secure the second position in the 2013 Kenyan Premier League, thus helping them qualify for the 2014 CAF Confederation Cup. He also helped them win the 2013 FKF President's Cup.

=== Rayon Sports ===
In September 2013, South African club, Orlando Pirates reached an agreement with Eymael, but later the deal failed to materialize.

In January 2014, he moved to Rwanda where he was appointed as the head coach of Rwanda National Football League club, Rayon Sports F.C. During his short time with the club, the team participated in the 2014 CAF Champions League where they lost on away goals rule to the Republic of the Congo's AC Léopards. He was praised for his impressive work in Rwanda as he helped his side secure 34 points out of 39 in the second leg of the 2013–14 Rwanda National Football League. He resigned as the club's head coach on 30 June 2014, having helped the team secure the second position in the 2013–14 Rwanda National League.

=== JS Kairouan ===
In July 2014, Eymael moved to Tunisia where he was appointed as the head coach of Tunisian Ligue Professionnelle 1 club, JS Kairouan. He helped the club secure the eighth position in the 2013–14 Tunisian Ligue Professionnelle 1, which was the club's best ever performance in the top division of the Tunisian Football Federation in the past ten years.

=== Al-Nasr ===
In November he became the manager of the Oman football club Al-Nasr SC.

=== Al-Merrikh ===
On 21 December 2015, he moved to Sudan where, on 23 December 2015, he signed a one-year contract with Al-Merrikh SC. He began his 2016 Sudan Premier League campaign on 27 January 2016 with a 2–0 win over Merrikh Kosti at the Al-Merrikh Stadium. He helped the Sudanese side qualify for the second round of the 2016 CAF Champions League, where they narrowly lost on aggregate to Algerian side, ES Sétif. His side was narrowly eliminated on a 2-1 aggregate in the playoff round of the 2016 CAF Confederation Cup by Moroccan side, Kawkab Marrakech. In all the competitions played by the Sudanese club under Eymael, they managed to win 17 games and played out 3 draws in a total of 22 ties.

=== Polokwane City ===
Eymael spent eight months working at Polokwane City. He found the team struggling and ending every year at the bottom half of the league rankings (precisely between position 16 and 14) fighting relegation battles. Eymael joined the club at the start of the 2016–2017 season and helped them end the first half of the campaign in fifth position in the league. This was the first time the club has reached such a high position, which made them title hopefuls. He then resigned amidst rumours he was going to join Bloemfontein Celtic.

=== Free State Stars ===
On 24 August 2017, Eymael joined South African Premier Soccer League club Free State Stars, taking over from Sammy Troughton. In 2018, Eymael guided them to their first cup final in 24 years after they beat Kaizer Chiefs 2–0 in the Nedbank Cup semifinal on 21 April 2018. He then took them to their first title, winning the final 1–0 against Maritzburg United.

On 12 November 2018, Eymael resigned from his position as the manager of Free State Stars following a second straight loss in the league with a 1–0 defeat at home against SuperSport United F.C.

=== Tala el Geish ===
On 22 November, Eymael signed a new contract in the Egyptian Premier League with Tala'ea El Gaish. On 1 June he finished his contract with Tala El Geish, finishing the season with the club in rank eight, the best position the club had achieved in the past seven years. He managed 20 games, winning eight, finishing six in a draw, and losing six.

=== Black Leopards ===
On 1 October 2019, Eymael signed with the Black Leopards in the Premier Soccer League in South Africa. Eymael resigned from his position with the Black Leopards of South Africa, citing personal reasons, after having helped bring them to the top eight.

He took the team at position number 6 in January and succeeded to finish the season on 26 July 2020 at position number 2 and qualified Yanga for the champions league. He was then relieved from his duties after he racially insulted fans in an explosive interview calling them "monkeys" and "dogs".

He managed the Tanzanian Premier League club Young Africans S.C. until July 2020. In July 2021 he was appointed as new manager of Stade Tunisien, but was sacked two months later after the arrival of a new club president.

=== Stade Tunisien ===
Luc Eymael signed a contract in Tunisia on 1 July 2021, but for important family and private reasons he had to leave the club on 20 September 2021 by mutual agreement.

=== Ittihad Misutrata ===
On 23 August 2022, Eymael signed in the Libyan first division at Ittihad Misrata. The goal is to try to make the final round (play off) of this new season to try to qualify for participation in Africa.

=== Aigles du Congo ===
Le 28 janvier 2024, Luc Eymael retourne en Afrique pour signer avec le nouveau club des AIGLES DU CONGO Football Club Les Aigles du Congo basé à Kinshasa en République Démocratique du Congo. The club created in August 2023 finished the normal phase of the championship in 4th place... allowing it to play the play off to perhaps reach a place to play in the next Champions League or the next Confederation Cup.

Belgian technician Luc Eymael from FC Les Aigles du Congo is elected best coach for the month of April in the Ligue 1 play-offs, by the panel of specialists from Info Linafoot Ligue 1.

He finished number 4 during the play off with eagles of Congo in Congo after qualifying the team for these play off during season 2023/2024 and has been elected 2 times coach of the month

=== FC St Eloi Lupopo ===
On September 28, 2024, Luc Eymael was appointed head of FC Saint Eloi Lupopo, a leading club based in Lubumbashi in the Democratic Republic of Congo. On May 30, 2025, Luc Eymael and FC Saint-Éloi Lupopo were compelled, due to security considerations, to end their collaboration by mutual agreement.

=== Chippa United FC ===
On August 20, 2025, Luc Eymael joined the "Chilli Boys" by signing with Chippa United FC, a South African Premier League club, thereby continuing his career at the highest level of continental football.

On October 22, 2025, Luc Eymael terminated his contract with Chippa United FC.

== Honors ==
AS Vita

- Linafoot: 2010
- Super Coupe du Congo: 2011

Missile

- Gabon Championnat National D1: 2010–11

A.F.C. Leopards

- Kenyan Premier League runners-up: 2013
- FKF President's Cup: 2013

Rayon Sports

- Rwanda National Football League runners-up: 2013–14

Free State Stars

- Nedbank Cup: 2018

FC Saint Éloi Lupopo

- Elected Best Coach two times in 2024 and once in 2025, for the classic phase of Group A in the Congolese Ligue 1
