= Alain da Costa =

Gabonese football manager (1935–2023)

Personal information
- Full name: Alain da Costa Soarès
- Date of birth: 1935
- Place of birth: French Equatorial Africa
- Date of death: 9 January 2023 (aged 87)
- Place of death: Libreville, Gabon

Managerial career
- Years: Team
- USM Libreville
- Vantour Mangoungou
- Gabon U17
- 1987–1989: Gabon
- 1994–1997: Gabon
- 199x–2000: Gabon (assistant)
- 2000–2002: Gabon

Alain da Costa Soarès (1935 – 9 January 2023) was a Gabonese professional football manager and coach.

== Career ==
Da Costa coached the USM Libreville and Vantour Mangoungou. Also he worked as manager of the Gabon U17 national team. From 1987 to 1989 and from 1994 to 1997 he led the Gabon senior national team. In June 2000 he again was a coach of the Gabonese Panthères.

From 2013 he worked as president of the Gabonese Football Federation.

== Honours ==
USM Libreville

- Coupe du Gabon Interclubs: 1987

Gabon

- CEMAC Cup: 1988
- Africa Cup of Nations quarterfinals: 1996

Gabon U17

- African U-17 Championship: quarterfinals 1987
