= N'Guéma =

N'Guéma or N'Guema can be both a middle name and a surname. Notable people with the name include:

- Erwin N'Guema Obame (born 1983), Gabonese football defender
- Erwin Nguéma Obame (born 1989), Gabonese football defender
- Patrick N'Guema N'Dong (1957–2021), French-Gabonese journalist
- Stéphane N'Guéma (born 1984), Gabonese football winger
