= Duval N'Zembi =

Gabonese footballer

Personal information
- Full name: Duval N'Zembi
- Date of birth: 12 October 1988 (age 38)
- Place of birth: Gabon
- Position: Forward

Senior career*
Years	Team	Apps	(Gls)
2004–2008	CMS Libreville		
2008–2009	US Bitam		
2009–2010	105 Libreville		
2010–2012	Chassieu Decines		
2012–2013	US Bitam		
2013–2015	Missile FC		
2015–2016	Centre Mbérie		
2016–2017	Club Quebracho		
2017	Viktoria Otrokovice	10	(2)
2017–2018	Fastav Zlín	0	(0)
2018	Frýdek-Místek	0	(0)
2018	Viktoria Otrokovice	7	(0)
2019–2020	SK Zápy	8	(0)

International career^{‡}
2014–	Gabon	3	(1)
- * Club domestic league appearances and goals as of 22:21, 12 January 2020 (UTC) ‡ National team caps and goals as of 22:21, 12 January 2020 (UTC)

Duval N'Zembi (born 12 October 1988) is a Gabonese former professional footballer who last played as a forward for Bohemian Football League club SK Zápy.
