= Achy =

Achy may refer to:

- Suffering from pain
- Stéphane Achy (born 1988), Gabonese footballer
- Achy Obejas, (born 1956), Cuban-American writer and translator focused on personal and national identity issues
- Achy, Oise, commune of France
