= Karl Max Barthélémy =

Chadian footballer (born 1986)

Karl Max
Personal information
- Full name: Karl Max Barthélémy
- Date of birth: 27 October 1986 (age 40)
- Place of birth: N'Djaména, Chad
- Height: 1.86 m (6 ft 1 in)
- Position: Forward

Team information
- Current team: Gazelle

Senior career*
Years	Team	Apps	(Gls)
2007–2010	Coton Sport	61	(17)
2010–2011	Missile	26	(20)
2011–2012	Difaâ El Jadidi	31	(23)
2012–2015	Club Africain	11	(0)
2012–2013	→ Difaâ El Jadidi (loan)	9	(1)
2013–2014	→ CF Mounana (loan)	0	(0)
2014–2015	→ Difaâ El Jadidi (loan)	14	(0)
2015–2016	Nejmeh	9	(2)
2016–2017	USM Aït Melloul	15	(8)
2018–2019	PKNP	20	(2)
2019–2020	Semen Padang	26	(8)
2022–	Gazelle	0	(0)

International career^{‡}
2010–2019	Chad	24	(2)
- * Club domestic league appearances and goals as of 28 November 2019 ‡ National team caps and goals as of 8 October 2020

Karl Max Barthélémy also known as Karl Max Dany (born 27 October 1986 in N'Djaména) is a Chadian professional footballer who plays as a forward for Chad Premier League club Gazelle.

== Club career ==
=== Difaâ El Jadidi ===
Barthélémy was the best scorer of the Gabonese national championship in 2010, scoring 20 goals. As of 2011, he plays for Difaa El Jadida from Morocco. He signed a 3-year contract. He was best scorer of Moroccan ligue with 17 goals.

=== PKNP FC ===
In May 2018, Barthélémy signed a contract with Malaysian team PKNP FC; but days after the signing, an injury suffered in a friendly with the team has him sidelined for more than a month, delaying his official debut for the team.

He made his long-awaited debut for PKNP in the 2018 Malaysia Cup against Pahang, as a substitute, on 18 August 2018.

== International career ==
Barthélémy started playing for the Chad national team in 2007. He played in the 2008 Africa Cup of Nations qualification in a match against Congo, and in the 2010 World Cup qualification, against the same team. In the 2012 Africa Cup of Nations qualification he played matches against Togo both home and away, Botswana away, Tunisia at home, and Malawi both away and at home, where he scored a goal in the dying minutes of the match for a final result 2-2. He played both matches against Tanzania, in a 2014 World Cup qualification, too.

=== International goals ===
Scores and results list Chad's goal tally first.

Goal	Date	Venue	Opponent	Score	Result	Competition
1.	19 June 2010	Stade Général-Seyni-Kountché, Niamey, Niger	Niger	1–0	1–2	Friendly
2.	8 October 2011	Stade Omnisports Idriss Mahamat Ouya, N'Djamena, Chad	Malawi	2–2	2–2	2012 Africa Cup of Nations qualification

== See also ==
- List of Chad international footballers
