= Arnold Yembi =

Gabonese footballer (born 1984)

Personal information
- Full name: Arnold Ulrich Yembi
- Date of birth: 11 November 1984 (age 41)
- Place of birth: Tchibanga, Gabon
- Height: 1.78 m (5 ft 10 in)
- Position: Forward

Senior career*
Years	Team	Apps	(Gls)
–2005	USM Libreville		
2006	FC Franceville		
2007–2009	USM Libreville		
2009–2012	US O’Mbilia Nzami		
2012–2013	US Bitam		
2013–2016	CMS Libreville		
2016–2017	Lozo Sport		

International career^{‡}
2004–2014	Gabon	7	(1)
- * Club domestic league appearances and goals ‡ National team caps and goals as of 14 November 2019

Arnold Yembi (born 11 November 1984) is a retired Gabonese professional footballer who played predominantly as a striker.
