= Zalang COC =

Zalang
- Full name: Zalang COC
- Ground: Stade Augustin Monédan de Sibang; Libreville, Gabon
- Capacity: 7,000

Zalang COC is a Gabonese football club based in Libreville, Gabon. The club currently plays in Gabon Championnat National D2. Currently the team plays at the 7000 capacity Stade Augustin Monédan de Sibang.

In 1974 the team won the Gabon Championnat National D1.

== Performance in CAF competitions ==
- CAF Champions League: 1 appearance

1974 African Cup of Champions Clubs – First Round
