= 1980 African Cup of Champions Clubs =

Tournament details
- Teams: 31 (from 1 confederation)

Final positions
- Champions: (Cameroon) Canon Yaoundé (3rd title)
- Runners-up: (Zaire) AS Bilima

Tournament statistics
- Matches played: 56
- Goals scored: 155 (2.77 per match)
- Top scorer(s): (Cameroon) Jean Manga-Onguéné (9 goals)
- Best player: (Cameroon) Jean Manga-Onguéné

The 1980 African Cup of Champions Clubs was the 16th edition of the annual international club football competition held in the CAF region (Africa), the African Cup of Champions Clubs. It determined that year's club champion of association football in Africa.

The tournament was played by 31 teams and was used a playoff scheme with home and away matches. Canon Yaoundé from Cameroon won that final, and became for the third time CAF club champion.

== First round ==
Team 1	Agg.	Team 2	1st leg	2nd leg
AS Niamey (Niger)	0–3	(Mali) Djoliba AC	0–1	0–2
Anges ABC (Gabon)	4–5	(Ghana) Hearts of Oak	2–3	2–2
Bendel Insurance (Nigeria)	w/o^{1}	(Uganda) UCB FC	—	—
Benfica de Bissau (Guinea-Bissau)	2–7	(Ivory Coast) Stella Adjamé	0–4	2–3
Canon Yaoundé (Cameroon)	7–3	(Angola) Primeiro de Agosto	3–0	4–3
Costa do Sol (Mozambique)	1–3	(Zaire) AS Bilima	0–0	1–3
Dragons de l'Ouémé (Benin)	0–3	(Algeria) MP Alger	0–0	0–3
CD Elá Nguema (Equatorial Guinea)	1–4	(Togo) AC Semassi	1–0	0–4
Fortior Mahajanga (Madagascar)	w/o^{1}	(Malawi) Limbe Leaf Wanderers	—	—
ASC Garde Nationale (Mauritania)	1–3	(Guinea) Hafia FC	1–1	0–2
Horseed FC (Somalia)	0–2	(Kenya) Gor Mahia	0–0	0–2
Linare FC (Lesotho)	2–4	(Tanzania) Simba SC	2–1	0–3
Mighty Blackpool (Sierra Leone)	1–4	(Senegal) ASF Police	1–2	0–2
Olympic Real de Bangui (Central African Republic)	1–4	(Republic of the Congo) Etoile du Congo	0–1	1–3
Wallidan FC (The Gambia)	1–2	(Republic of Upper Volta) Silures Bobo-Dioulasso	1–1	0–1

^{1} UCB FC and Limbe Leaf Wanderers withdrew.

== Second round ==
Team 1	Agg.	Team 2	1st leg	2nd leg
AS Bilima (Zaire)	4–1	(Madagascar) Fortior Mahajanga	3–0	1–1
Bendel Insurance (Nigeria)	4–4 (a)	(Kenya) Gor Mahia	1–2	3–2
Djoliba AC (Mali)	1–2	(Ghana) Hearts of Oak	1–1	0–1
Etoile du Congo (Republic of the Congo)	1–1 (3–1 p)	(Guinea) Hafia FC	0–1	1–0
AC Semassi (Togo)	1–2	(Senegal) ASF Police	1–1	0–1
Silures Bobo-Dioulasso (Republic of Upper Volta)	0–4	(Cameroon) Canon Yaoundé	0–1	0–3
Simba SC (Tanzania)	2–5	(Cameroon) Union Douala	2–4	0–1
Stella Adjamé (Ivory Coast)	5–5 (a)	(Algeria) MP Alger	4–2	1–3

== Quarter-finals ==
Team 1	Agg.	Team 2	1st leg	2nd leg
Canon Yaoundé (Cameroon)	3–3 (a)	(Algeria) MP Alger	2–0	1–3
Etoile du Congo (Republic of the Congo)	3–3 (a)	(Nigeria) Bendel Insurance	3–2	0–1
Hearts of Oak (Ghana)	1–4	(Zaire) AS Bilima	1–3	0–1
ASF Police (Senegal)	3–5	(Cameroon) Union Douala	0–3	3–2

== Semi-finals ==
Team 1	Agg.	Team 2	1st leg	2nd leg
Canon Yaoundé (Cameroon)	4–2	(Nigeria) Bendel Insurance	0–0	4–2
Union Douala (Cameroon)	2–5	(Zaire) AS Bilima	1–0	1–5

== Final ==
30 November 1980
--:-- UTC+1

Canon Yaoundé (Cameroon)	2–2	(Zaire) AS Bilima
Goal		Ayel; Yafu

Stade de Garoua, Garoua
14 December 1980
--:-- UTC+1

AS Bilima (Zaire)	0–3	(Cameroon) Canon Yaoundé
		Manga Onguéné; Abega

20 May Stadium, Kinshasa

== Champion ==
African Cup of Champions Clubs 1980
(Cameroon) Canon Yaoundé
Third title

== Top scorers ==
The top scorers from the 1980 African Cup of Champions Clubs are as follows:

Rank	Name	Team	Goals
1	(Cameroon) Jean Manga Onguéné	(Cameroon) Canon Yaoundé	9
2	(Zaire) Ayel Mayélé	(Zaire) AS Bilima	5
3	(Algeria) Lakhdar Belloumi	(Algeria) MP Alger	4
3	(Nigeria) Ibrahim Alikali	(Nigeria) Bendel Insurance	4
5	(Cameroon) Théophile Abega	(Cameroon) Canon Yaoundé	3
5	(Kenya) Andrew Obunga	(Kenya) Gor Mahia	3
7	(Algeria) Abdelwahab Zenir	(Algeria) MP Alger	2
7	(Cameroon) Grégoire M'Bida	(Cameroon) Canon Yaoundé	2
7	(Gabon) ... Tchibundo	(Gabon) Anges ABC	2
7	(Ghana) Dan Kayede	(Ghana) Hearts of Oak	2
7	(Ivory Coast) Léon Gbizié	(Ivory Coast) Stella Club d'Adjamé	2
7	(Ivory Coast) Francis Doé	(Ivory Coast) Stella Club d'Adjamé	2
7	(Zaire) Jean Mandiangu	(Zaire) AS Bilima	2
