= Régis Manon =

Gabonese footballer and coach (1965-2018)

Personal information
- Date of birth: 22 October 1965
- Place of birth: Libreville, Gabon
- Date of death: 1 January 2018 (aged 52)
- Place of death: Libreville, Gabon
- Height: 1.65 m (5 ft 5 in)
- Position: Striker

Senior career*
Years	Team	Apps	(Gls)
1981–1983	FC 105 Libreville		
1983–1984	Tours B	25	(3)
1984–1990	Tours	149	(32)
1990–1992	Joué-lès-Tours		
1993–1996	FC 105 Libreville		
Total		174+	(35+)

International career
1984–1997	Gabon	32	(8)
- * Club domestic league appearances and goals

Régis Manon (22 October 1965 – 1 January 2018) was a Gabonese professional football player and coach.

== Career ==
Born in Libreville, Manon played club football for FC 105 Libreville, Tours B, Tours and Joué-lès-Tours.

He also played for the Gabonese national team, and was a squad member at the 1994 Africa Cup of Nations.

He later became a coach, for teams including Mounana and Akanda.
