= Yannick Larry =

Gabonese footballer

Lary
Personal information
- Full name: Lary Evrard Yannick
- Date of birth: 10 December 1982 (age 43)
- Place of birth: Libreville, Gabon
- Height: 1.73 m (5 ft 8 in)
- Position: Forward

Senior career*
Years	Team	Apps	(Gls)
1999–2000	JS Libreville	–	(–)
2000–2002	FC 105	–	(25)
2002–2004	Gil Vicente	15	(2)
2004–2007	Marco	28	(5)
2007–2008	FK Makedonija	–	(–)
2011–2013	Mounana	–	(–)

International career
2002–2003	Gabon	7	(2)
- * Club domestic league appearances and goals

Lary Evrard Yannick (born 10 December 1982), known as Lary, is a former Gabonese footballer who played as a forward.

== International career ==
Lary made his debut on 7 September 2002 in a 1–0 African Cup of Nations qualifying loss against Morocco in Libreville.

On 29 March 2003, Lary scored a brace for the national team in a 4–0 victory over Equatorial Guinea at Stade d'Angondjé in Libreville.

=== International goals ===
Scores and results list Gabon's goal tally first.

#	Date	Venue	Opponent	Score	Result	Competition
1.	29 March 2003	Stade d'Angondjé, Libreville	Equatorial Guinea	2–0	4–0	2004 African Cup of Nations qualification
2.	29 March 2003	Stade d'Angondjé, Libreville	Equatorial Guinea	3–0	4–0	2004 African Cup of Nations qualification
