= 1977 African Cup Winners' Cup =

Tournament details
- Dates: April - 5 December 1977
- Teams: 25 (from 1 confederation)

Final positions
- Champions: (Nigeria) Enugu Rangers (1st title)
- Runners-up: (Cameroon) Canon Yaoundé

Tournament statistics
- Matches played: 45
- Goals scored: 128 (2.84 per match)

The African Cup Winners' Cup 1977 was the third edition of Africa's secondary interclub competition. The tournament was played by 25 teams and used a knock-out format with ties played home and away. Enugu Rangers from Nigeria won the final, and claimed their first African club trophy.

== First round ==
| Team 1 | Agg. | Team 2 | 1st leg | 2nd leg |
|---|---|---|---|---|
| Bata Bullets (Malawi) | 5 – 3 | (Uganda) Gangama United | 4 – 1 | 1 – 2 |
| Canon Yaoundé (Cameroon) | w/o | (Central African Republic) Red Star Bangui FC | – | – |
| Cedar United (Liberia) | 1 – 2 | (Guinea-Bissau) Sporting Clube de Bissau | 1 – 1 | 0 – 1 |
| Enugu Rangers (Nigeria) | 1 – 1 (a) | (Libya) Al-Ahly (Tripoli) | 0 – 0 | 1 – 1 |
| ASKO Kara (Togo) | 2 – 3 | (Gabon) Anges ABC | 1 – 0 | 1 – 3 |
| Liberté F.C. (Niger) | 2 – 7 | (Republic of Upper Volta) Kadiogo F.C. | 1 – 1 | 1 – 6 |
| Luo Union (Kenya) | 1 – 2 | (Algeria) MO Constantine | 1 – 0 | 0 – 2^{1} |
| Matlama FC (Lesotho) | 4 – 11 | (Tanzania) Rangers International | 2 – 5 | 2 – 6 |
| Wallidan F.C. (The Gambia) | 1 – 1 (a) | (Mauritania) Espoirs (Nouakchott) | 0 – 0 | 1 – 1 |
| AS Kaloum Star (Guinea) | bye | | | |
| Al Ittihad Alexandria (Egypt) | bye | | | |
| Electric Sports (Ethiopia) | bye | | | |
| Ndola United (Zambia) | bye | | | |
| ASF Police (Senegal) | bye | | | |
| Shooting Stars F.C. (Nigeria) | bye | | | |
| Stade d'Abidjan (Ivory Coast) | bye | | | |

^{1} Due to a scheduling error, Luo Union arrived for the 2nd leg on Friday night without four key players believing that the match was scheduled for the following night, and subsequently failed to travel to the stadium for the match. MO Constantine were awarded a 2-0 victory.

== Second round ==
| Team 1 | Agg. | Team 2 | 1st leg | 2nd leg |
|---|---|---|---|---|
| Enugu Rangers (Nigeria) | 6 - 0 | (Ethiopia) Electric Sports | 4 - 0 | 2 - 0 |
| Kadiogo F.C. (Republic of Upper Volta) | 3 - 2 | (Guinea) AS Kaloum Star | 2 - 1 | 1 - 1 |
| MO Constantine (Algeria) | 2 - 3 | (Egypt) Al Ittihad Alexandria | 1 - 0 | 1 - 3 |
| Ndola United (Zambia) | 2 - 3 | (Tanzania) Rangers International F.C. | 1 - 2 | 1 - 1 |
| ASF Police (Senegal) | 8 - 1 | (Gabon) Anges ABC | 0 - 0 | 8 - 1 |
| Shooting Stars F.C. (Nigeria) | 4 - 2 | (Malawi) Bata Bullets | 4 - 1 | 0 - 1 |
| Stade d'Abidjan (Ivory Coast) | 4 - 3 | (Mauritania) Espoirs (Nouakchott) | 3 - 0 | 1 - 3 |
| Sporting Clube de Bissau (Guinea-Bissau) | 1 - 11 | (Cameroon) Canon Yaoundé | 0 - 4 | 1 - 7 |

== Quarterfinals ==
| Team 1 | Agg. | Team 2 | 1st leg | 2nd leg |
|---|---|---|---|---|
| Al Ittihad Alexandria (Egypt) | 2-0 | (Tanzania) Rangers International | 2-0 | 0-0 |
| Enugu Rangers (Nigeria) | 2-1 | (Senegal) ASF Police | 0-0 | 2-1 |
| Kadiogo F.C. (Republic of Upper Volta) | 3-5 | (Cameroon) Canon Yaoundé | 2-1 | 1-4 |
| Stade d'Abidjan (Ivory Coast) | 2-3 | (Nigeria) Shooting Stars F.C. | 2-0 | 0-3 |

== Semifinals ==
| Team 1 | Agg. | Team 2 | 1st leg | 2nd leg |
|---|---|---|---|---|
| Al Ittihad Alexandria (Egypt) | 1-2 | (Cameroon) Canon Yaoundé | 1-0 | 0-2 |
| Shooting Stars F.C. (Nigeria) | 0-0 (2-4 p) | (Nigeria) Enugu Rangers | 0-0 | 0-0 |

== Final ==
| Team 1 | Agg. | Team 2 | 1st leg | 2nd leg |
|---|---|---|---|---|
| Enugu Rangers (Nigeria) | 5-2 | (Cameroon) Canon Yaoundé | 4-1 | 1-1 |

== Champion ==
African Cup Winners' Cup
1977 Winners

Enugu Rangers
First Title
