= AS Police (Gabon) =

Police
- Full name: AS Police (Libreville)
- Ground: Stade Omar Bongo; Libreville, Gabon
- Capacity: 40,000
- League: Gabon Championnat National D1

AS Police (Libreville) is a football club from Gabon based in Libreville in the Estuaire Province.

The team has played many seasons in Gabon Championnat National D1.

In 1973–1974 the club has won the Gabon Championnat National D1.

== Stadium ==
Currently the team plays at the Stade Omar Bongo.

== Honours ==
- Gabon Championnat National D1:
