= Aigle Royal FC =

Aigle Royal
- Full name: Aigle Royal Football Club
- Founded: 2012
- Ground: Stade Augustin Monédan de Sibang; Libreville, Gabon
- Capacity: 7,000

Aigle Royal Football Club is a Gabonese football club based in Libreville, Gabon. The club currently plays in Gabon Championnat National D2.

In 1968 and 1969 the team has won the Gabon Championnat National D1.

== Stadium ==
Currently the team plays at the 7,000 capacity Stade Augustin Monédan de Sibang.

== Honours ==
- Gabon Championnat National D1

Champion (2): 1968, 1969

== Performance in CAF competitions ==
- CAF Champions League: 1 appearance

1970 – First round
