= Anselme Délicat =

Gabonese footballer and manager

Personal information
- Place of birth: Gabon
- Position: Midfielder

Team information
- Current team: USM Libreville (coach)

Senior career*
Years	Team	Apps	(Gls)
- USM Libreville
1983–1986	Vojvodina	19	(0)

International career
1984	Gabon	5	(0)

Managerial career
- 2001–2009: USM Libreville
- 2015–2016: USM Libreville
- * Club domestic league appearances and goals

Anselme Délicat is a Gabonese football manager and former player.

Since late 2000s he has been the main coach of USM Libreville.

== Club career ==
He started his career at USM Libreville where he played until when he moved to Yugoslav League.

While a player, Delicat was one of the first African players to have played in the Yugoslav First League. He spend three seasons, from 1983 until 1986, in a Serbian side FK Vojvodina, where he was appreciated by the local fans and nicknamed "Žika Delika". His previous nickname, while still playing in Gabon, was "Kopa", because it's said that his style remembered the famous French footballer Raymond Kopa. He is still remembered in Novi Sad for his speed and technical abilities.

Previously, he has played with USM Libreville. He scored two goals in the final of the 1980–81 Gabon Championnat National D1 in which his team USM won against FC 105 Libreville by 4–2.

== International career ==
Even before coming to Europe, Delicat was one of the most influential players in the Gabon national football team.

== Coaching career ==
At the end of 2008 he was coaching the Gabon Championnat National D1 club USM Libreville. He was coach of USM as early as 2001.

In March 2016, while coaching USM, which were second-placed aspiring promotion to top-level, Delicat was sanctioned for insubordination by club president, former army general Jean Boniface Asselé. Delicat joined the club 3 rounds before the end of the 2014–15 season when they were relegated from the Gabon Championnat National D1.

== Honors ==
- Gabon Championnat National D1: 1980–81
