= Thierry Tazemeta (footballer, born 2007) =

Austrian footballer (born 2007)

Personal information
- Full name: Thierry Fidjeu-Tazemeta Junior
- Date of birth: 27 July 2007 (age 19)
- Place of birth: Klagenfurt, Austria
- Height: 1.92 m (6 ft 4 in)
- Positions: Winger; forward

Team information
- Current team: 1. FC Kaiserslautern
- Number: 39

Youth career
- –2020: SV Horn
- 2020–2023: SKN St. Pölten
- 2024–2026: Borussia Dortmund

Senior career*
Years	Team	Apps	(Gls)
2026	Borussia Dortmund II	1	(0)
2026–	1. FC Kaiserslautern	7	(2)

International career^{‡}
2021	Austria U15	2	(0)
2022–2023	Austria U16	11	(3)
2023–2025	Austria U17	12	(2)
2024	Austria U18	4	(1)
2026–	Austria U19	3	(1)
2026–	Austria U21	1	(0)
- * Club domestic league appearances and goals as of 17 October 2026 ‡ National team caps and goals as of 2 October 2026

Thierry Fidjeu-Tazemeta Junior (born 27 July 2007) is an Austrian professional footballer who plays as a winger or forward for 1. FC Kaiserslautern.

== Early life ==
Tazemata was born on 7 July 2007. Born in Klagenfurt, Austria, he is the son of Equatorial Guinea international Thierry Fidjeu.

== Club career ==
As a youth player, Tazemata joined the youth academy of SV Horn. Following his stint there, he joined the youth academy of SKN St. Pölten in 2020.

Subsequently, he joined the youth academy of German Bundesliga side Borussia Dortmund in 2024, helping the club's under-17 team win the league title. In 2026, he was promoted to their reserve team, where he made one league appearance and scored zero goals.

Ahead of the 2026–27 season, he signed for German outfit 1. FC Kaiserslautern. On 30 August 2026, he scored his first goal for the club during a 2–1 away win over FC St. Pauli in the league.

== International career ==
Tazemata is an Austria youth international and has represented the country internationally at under-15, under-16, under-17, under-18, under-19 and under-21 levels and is eligible to represent Cameroon internationally through his father.

During the spring of 2026, he played for the Austria national under-19 football team for 2026 UEFA European Under-19 Championship qualification. The same year, he played for the Austria national under-21 football team for 2027 UEFA European Under-21 Championship qualification.

== Style of play ==
Tazemata plays as a winger or forward. Left-footed, he is known for his dribbling ability.
