= Stade d'Akébé =

- Full name: Club Sportive; Stade d'Akébé
- Founded: 1983
- Ground: Stade Omar Bongo; Libreville, Gabon
- Capacity: 45,000
- Chairman: Fidèle Lebondo Ambaly
- Manager: Esaïe Nsangou
- League: Gabon Championnat National D2
Home colours	Away colours

Stade d'Akébé is a Gabonese football club based in Libreville, Gabon. It was founded in 1983.
