= Cédric Ondo Biyoghé =

Gabonese footballer

Personal information
- Full name: Cédric Ondo Biyoghé
- Date of birth: 17 August 1994 (age 32)
- Place of birth: Gabon
- Position: Forward

Senior career*
Years	Team	Apps	(Gls)
2012–2015	Cercle Mbéri Sportif		
2015–2017	Mounana		(14+)
2017–2018	El Dakhleya	19	(1)
2018	Olympic Safi	0	(0)
2019	AS Vita		
2020	Maghreb de Fès		

International career
2013–2016	Gabon	9	(0)
- * Club domestic league appearances and goals

Cédric Ondo Biyoghé (born 17 August 1994) is a Gabonese former professional footballer who played as a forward.

== Career ==
Ondo started his club career with Cercle Mbéri Sportif in 2012 before joining CF Mounana in 2015.

Ondo signed with AS Vita Club in January 2019. One year after joining Vita, he returned to Morocco, signing with Maghreb de Fès. He retired at Maghreb de Fès in 2020.

== International ==
On 16 January 2016 Ondo made his debut for Gabon in the 2016 African Nations Championship against Morocco. He started the match and played the full ninety minutes as Gabon drew 0–0.

== Career statistics ==
=== International ===
Appearances and goals by national team and year
National team	Year	Apps	Goals
Gabon	2013	2	0
Gabon	2014	3	0
Gabon	2015	0	0
Gabon	2016	4	0
Total		9	0
