= Coupe du Gabon Interclubs =

Football tournament in Gabon

The Coupe du Gabon Interclubs is the top knockout tournament of the Gabonese football.

== Winners ==
- 1961–63 : unknown
- 1964 : AS Mangasport (Moanda)
- 1965–77 : unknown
- 1978 : AS Stade Mandji (Ogooué-Maritime)
- 1979 : AS Stade Mandji (Ogooué-Maritime)
- 1980–83 : unknown
- 1984 : ASMO/FC 105 (Libreville) 2–1 AS Sogara (Port-Gentil)
- 1985 : AS Sogara (Port-Gentil)
- 1986 : ASMO/FC 105 (Libreville)
- 1987 : USM Libreville bt Mbilinga FC (Port-Gentil)
- 1988 : Vantour Mangoungou (Libreville) 1–0 Shellsport (Port-Gentil)
- 1989 : Petrosport (Port-Gentil)
- 1990 : Shellsport (Port-Gentil)
- 1991 : USM Libreville
- 1992 : Delta Sports (Libreville) 4–0 ASMO/FC 105 (Libreville)
- 1993 : Mbilinga FC (Libreville) 2–1 (a.e.t.) Delta Sports (Libreville)
- 1994 : AS Mangasport (Moanda) 4–3 Petrosport (Port-Gentil)
- 1995 : Mbilinga FC (Port-Gentil)
- 1996 : ASMO/FC 105 (Libreville)
- 1997 : Mbilinga FC (Port-Gentil)
- 1998 : Mbilinga FC (Port-Gentil) 3–0 Wongosport (Libreville)
- 1999 : US Bitam 2-1 Aigles Verts (Port-Gentil)
- 2000 : AO Evizo (Lambarèné)
- 2001 : AS Mangasport (Moanda) 1–0 TP Akwembé (Libreville)
- 2002 : USM Libreville 1–1 (4–2 (pen.)) JS Libreville
- 2003 : US Bitam 1–1 (4–3 (pen.)) USM Libreville
- 2004 : FC 105 Libreville 3–2 AS Mangasport (Moanda)
- 2005 : AS Mangasport (Moanda) 2–0 Sogéa FC (Libreville)
- 2006 : Téléstar FC (Libreville) 3–2 FC 105 Libreville
- 2007 : AS Mangasport (Moanda) 1–0 Sogéa FC (Libreville)
- 2008 : USM Libreville 2–1 AS Mangasport (Moanda)
- 2009 : FC 105 Libreville 2–1 (aet) Sogéa FC
- 2010 : US Bitam 2–1 Missile FC (Libreville)
- 2011 : AS Mangasport (Moanda) 1–0 AS Pélican
- 2012 : not held
- 2013 : CF Mounana (Libreville) 2–0 US Bitam
- 2014 : not held
- 2015 : CF Mounana (Libreville) 2–1 AFJ (Libreville)
- 2016 : CF Mounana (Libreville) 3–0 Akanda FC (Libreville)
