= Gervais Kago =

Central African Republic footballer

Personal information
- Full name: Arnold Gervais Kago
- Date of birth: 19 December 1987 (age 38)
- Place of birth: Bangui, Central African Republic
- Height: 1.85 m (6 ft 1 in)
- Position: Midfielder

Team information
- Current team: Bamboutos FC

Senior career*
Years	Team	Apps	(Gls)
–2011	Olympic Real de Bangui		
2011–2012	Simba SC		
2012–2014	US Bitam		
2014	Vegetarianos FC		
2015	Astres FC		
2016–	Bamboutos FC		

International career
2011–2016	Central African Republic	14	(0)
- * Club domestic league appearances and goals

Gervais Kago (born 19 December 1987 in Bangui, Central African Republic) is a footballer from the Central African Republic who currently plays for Bamboutos FC of the Elite One, the top division of Cameroonian football.

== Simba SC ==
Alongside Felix Sunzu, Kago transferred to Tanzanian giants Simba SC in August 2011. However, the midfielder was not allowed to participate in club matches as FIFA approbated a peremptory rule that the Transfer Matching System must be used to record the transfer which did not happen beforehand. By late August, the Tanzania Football Federation secured his International Transfer Certificate through the Transfer Matching System, clearing him to play, serendipitiously in time for the Tanzania Community Shield which he participated in.

== International ==
Missed the 2012 Africa Cup of Nations qualification group stage clash encountering Morocco after failure to get the plane ticket punctually.
