= Vantour Mangoungou =

Vautour Club
- Full name: Vautour Club Police
- Ground: Stade Augustin Monédan de Sibang; Libreville, Gabon
- Capacity: 7.000
- Chairman: ?
- Manager: ?
- League: Gabon Championnat National D2
- 2026: 3rd

Vautour Club Police is a Gabonese football club based in Libreville. They play in the Gabon Championnat National D2.

In 1976 and 1977 the team won the Gabon Championnat National D1. They won the Gabonese Cup in 1988

== Honours ==
- Gabon Championnat National D1: 1976, 1977
- Coupe du Gabon Interclubs: 1988

== Stadium ==
Currently the team plays at the Stade Augustin Monédan de Sibang.
