= AS Sogara =

- Founded: 1958
- Dissolved: 1994
Home colours	Away colours

AS Sogara was a Gabonese football club based in Port-Gentil. It club existed from 1958 to 1994.

== Honours ==
- African Cup Winners' Cup: 0

Runners-up (1): 1986

- Gabonese Championship: 6

1984, 1989, 1991, 1992, 1993, 1994

- Gabonese Cup: 1

1985
Runners-up (1): 1984

- Gabonese Supercup: 0

Runners-up (1): 1994
