= Achy, Oise =

Achy
- Commune
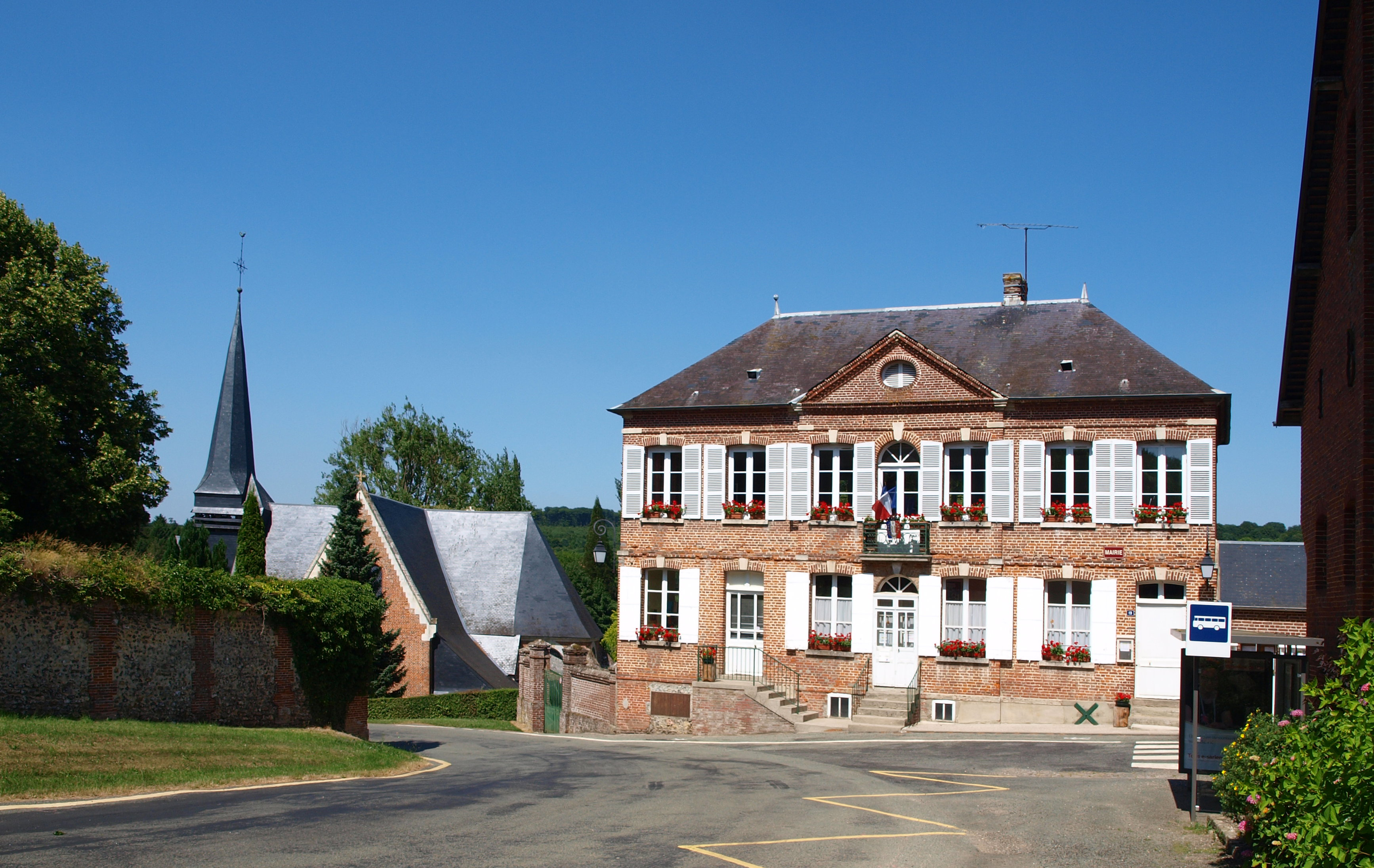
- The church and town hall in Achy
- Location of Achy
- Location within France Location within Hauts-de-France
- Coordinates: 49°33′25″N 1°58′48″E
- Country: France
- Region: Hauts-de-France
- Department: Oise
- Arrondissement: Beauvais
- Canton: Grandvilliers
- Intercommunality: Picardie Verte

Government
  - Mayor (2020–2026): Sylviane Decherf
- Area^{1}: 12.7 km^{2} (4.9 sq mi)
- Highest elevation: 187 m (614 ft)
- Lowest elevation: 91 m (299 ft)
- Population (2023): 408
  - Density: 32.1/km^{2} (83.2/sq mi)
- Time zone: UTC+01:00 (CET)
  - Summer (DST): UTC+02:00 (CEST)
- INSEE/Postal code: 60004 /60690
- ^{1} French Land Register data, which excludes lakes, ponds, glaciers > 1 km^{2} (0.386 sq mi or 247 acres) and river estuaries.

Achy (French pronunciation: [aʃi]) is a commune in the Oise department in northern France.

== Population ==
Historical population
Year	Pop.	±% p.a.
1968	235	—
1975	251	+0.95%
1982	266	+0.83%
1990	319	+2.30%
1999	288	−1.13%
2007	330	+1.72%
2012	382	+2.97%
2017	402	+1.03%
2023	408	+0.25%
Source: INSEE

== See also ==
- Communes of the Oise department
