= Anges ABC =

Anges
- Full name: Anges ABC
- Ground: Stade Augustin Monédan de Sibang; Libreville, Gabon
- Capacity: 7,000

Anges ABC is a Gabonese football club based in Libreville, Gabon. The club currently plays in Gabon Championnat National D2.

In 1978 the team has won the Gabon Championnat National D1.

== Stadium ==
Currently the team plays at the 7000 capacity Stade Augustin Monédan de Sibang.

== Honours ==
- Gabon Championnat National D1: 1978
