= Hermann Nkodia =

Congolese professional footballer (born 1988)

Personal information
- Date of birth: 7 July 1988 (age 38)
- Place of birth: Pointe-Noire, Congo
- Height: 1.71 m (5 ft 7 in)
- Position: Defender

Team information
- Current team: AC Léopards

Senior career*
Years	Team	Apps	(Gls)
2009–	AC Léopards		

International career
2010–2014	Congo	4	(0)
- * Club domestic league appearances and goals

Hermann Nkodia is a Congolese professional footballer who plays as a defender for AC Léopards.

== International career ==
In January 2014, coach Claude Leroy, invited him to be included in the Congo national football team for the 2014 African Nations Championship. The team was eliminated in the group stages after losing to Ghana, drawing with Libya and defeating Ethiopia.
