= Glen Kinfounia =

Congolese footballer

Personal information
- Full name: Gougou Glen Kinfounia N'gouama
- Date of birth: 28 July 1996 (age 30)
- Place of birth: Congo
- Position: Midfielder

Team information
- Current team: CARA Brazzaville
- Number: 7

Senior career*
Years	Team	Apps	(Gls)
- Diables Noirs
- CARA Brazzaville
- * Club domestic league appearances and goals

Glen Kinfounia is a Congolese professional footballer who plays as a midfielder for CARA Brazzaville.

== International career ==
In January 2014, coach Claude Leroy, invited him to be a part of the Congo squad for the 2014 African Nations Championship. The team was eliminated in the group stages after losing to Ghana, drawing with Libya and defeating Ethiopia.
