= Erwin N'Guema Obame =

Gabonese footballer

Erwin N'Guema
Personal information
- Full name: Erwin N'Guema
- Date of birth: 18 March 1983 (age 43)
- Place of birth: Bitam, Gabon
- Height: 1.84 m (6 ft 0 in)
- Position: Defender

International career^{‡}
Years	Team	Apps	(Gls)
2008–	Gabon	6	(1)
- ‡ National team caps and goals as of 09:26, 26 October 2015 (UTC)

Erwin N'Guema (born 18 March 1983) is a Gabonese professional footballer who currently plays as a defender.
