= Étienne Momokoamas =

Central African Republic football manager

Personal information
- Full name: Jean Etienne Kopo Momokoamas
- Place of birth: Central African Republic

Managerial career
- Years: Team
- 2004–2006: Central African Republic
- 2011: Olympic Real de Bangui
- 2013–2014: Central African Republic (assistant)

Jean Étienne Kopo Momokoamas is a Central African Republic professional football manager.

== Career ==
From 2004 until 2006 Momokoamas coached the Central African Republic national team. In 2011, he was a head coach of the Olympic Real de Bangui. From 2013 he worked with the national team as an assistant.
