= Kevine Andzouana =

Congolese former professional footballer

Personal information
- Full name: Leonce Kevine Andzouana
- Date of birth: 15 November 1982 (age 43)
- Place of birth: Brazzaville, Congo
- Position: Centre-back

Team information
- Current team: Diables Noirs

Senior career*
Years	Team	Apps	(Gls)
2004–2007	Diables Noirs		
2007–2008	Golden Arrows	8	(0)
2008–2013	Diables Noirs		
2014–2015	AC Léopards		
2016–2017	Diables Noirs		

International career
2004–2014	Congo	28	(0)
- * Club domestic league appearances and goals

Leonce Kevine Andzouana (born 15 November 1982) is a Congolese former professional footballer who played as a centre-back.

== Club career ==
Andzouana played with Brazzaville club Diables Noirs over three spells as well as for Golden Arrows of the Premier Soccer League in South Africa, and Dolisie club AC Léopards.

== International career ==
In January 2014, coach Claude Leroy, invited him to be a part of the Congo squad for the 2014 African Nations Championship. The team was eliminated in the group stages after losing to Ghana, drawing with Libya and defeating Ethiopia.

== Career statistics ==
Appearances and goals by national team and year
National team	Year	Apps	Goals
Congo	2004	1	0
Congo	2005	5	0
Congo	2006	2	0
Congo	2007	8	0
Congo	2008	5	0
Congo	2009	1	0
Congo	2010	0	0
Congo	2011	0	0
Congo	2012	0	0
Congo	2013	2	0
Congo	2014	2	0
Total		28	0
