= Stade Idriss Ngari =

Stadium in Owendo, Gabon

- Full name: Stade Idriss Ngari
- Location: Owendo, Gabon
- Capacity: 5,000

Tenant
- Association Sportive des Commerçants Mounana

Stade Idriss Ngari is a multi-use stadium in Owendo, Gabon. It is currently used mostly for football matches, on club level by Association Sportive des Commerçants Mounana of the Gabon Championnat National D1. The stadium has a capacity of 5,000 spectators.
