= Thierry Fidjeu =

Cameroonian footballer (born 1982)

Personal information
- Full name: Thierry Fidjeu Tazemeta
- Date of birth: 13 October 1982 (age 44)
- Place of birth: Douala, Cameroon
- Height: 1.79 m (5 ft 10 in)
- Position: Striker

Senior career*
Years	Team	Apps	(Gls)
1998	Camrail de Douala		
1998–2002	PMUC		
2002–2004	Union Douala		
2004–2005	Xewkija Tigers	23	(32)
2005–2006	Horn	23	(20)
2006	Schwanenstadt	17	(12)
2007–2008	Austria Kärnten	13	(1)
2008–2009	Maccabi Netanya	25	(5)
2009–2010	Diyarbakırspor	20	(6)
2010–2011	Konyaspor	18	(1)
2012	Austria Klagenfurt	8	(0)
2013–2014	Horn	42	(8)
2014	Singhtarua	8	(0)
2014–2015	Saint-Colomban Locminé	4	(0)
2015	Valletta	1	(1)
2015	Xewkija Tigers	6	(1)
2016–2018	USV Hartberg/Umgebung	57	(26)
2018	SV Anger	10	(0)
2018	Floing / Anger II	1	(0)
2019–2020	USV Hofkirchen	24	(21)
2021–2022	FC Zuzwil		
Total		300	(134)

International career
2001–2002	Cameroon U20	2	(0)
2011–2014	Equatorial Guinea	19	(3)
- * Club domestic league appearances and goals

Thierry Fidjeu Tazemeta (born 13 October 1982) is a Cameroonian former professional footballer who played as a striker. Although he played for the Equatorial Guinea national team, he was later found ineligible by the Confederation of African Football.

== International career ==
Fidjeu was born in Douala, Cameroon. He debuted for Equatorial Guinea in a friendly match against Chad on 8 February 2011. He represented the nation at the 2012 Africa Cup of Nations, of which it was co-host with neighbouring Gabon.

He took part in Equatorial Guinea's first round victory against Mauritania in qualification for the 2015 Africa Cup of Nations, but was later found ineligible to represent Equatorial Guinea by the Confederation of African Football, resulting in the country's expulsion from the qualification campaign. However, they were reinstated after Morocco withdrew from hosting due to Ebola outbreak.

== Personal life ==
Fidjeu has an Austrian son, born in 2007 and named after him, who is a footballer in the youth ranks of German club Borussia Dortmund and represents Austria at international level.

== Career statistics ==
=== International ===
Appearances and goals by national team and year
National team	Year	Apps	Goals
Equatorial Guinea	2011	6	1
Equatorial Guinea	2012	5	0
Equatorial Guinea	2013	5	2
Equatorial Guinea	2014	3	0
Total		19	3

Scores and results list Equatorial Guinea's goal tally first, score column indicates score after each Fidjeu goal.

List of international goals scored by Thierry Fidjeu
No.	Date	Venue	Opponent	Score	Result	Competition	Ref.
1	29 March 2011	Estadio La Paz, Malabo, Equatorial Guinea	Gambia	1–0	1–0	Friendly	
2	4 September 2013	Estadio de Malabo, Malabo, Equatorial Guinea	Libya	1–0	1–1	Friendly	
3	15 December 2013	Stade de Franceville, Franceville, Gabon	Gabon	1–1	1–2	2013 CEMAC Cup	
