= AS Solidarité =

Association football club in Gabon

Solidarité
- Full name: AS Solidarité
- Ground: Stade Pierre Claver Divounguy; Port-Gentil, Gabon
- Capacity: 7,000
- League: Gabon Championnat National D1
- 2013–14: 10th

AS Solidarité is a Gabonese football club based in Port-Gentil, Gabon. The club currently plays in Gabon Championnat National D1.

The club's colors are black and pink.

== Stadium ==
Currently the team plays at the 7,000 capacity Stade Pierre Claver Divounguy.

== League participations ==
- Gabon Championnat National D1: 2011–
- Gabon Second Division: ????–2011
