= 2013 CEMAC Cup =

International football competition

The 2013 CEMAC Cup is the eighth edition of the CEMAC Cup, the football championship of Central African nations. The tournament was held in Franceville and Bitam of Gabon from December 9–21.

== Group stage ==
=== Group A ===
Team	Pts	Pld	W	D	L	GF	GA
Gabon	6	2	2	0	0	5	1
Cameroon	3	2	1	0	1	2	4
Equatorial Guinea	0	2	0	0	2	2	4

9 December 2013

Gabon	3-0	Cameroon
13' (o.g.) Makon; 38' Mouele; 90+2' Yacouya

Referee: Flavien Soumou (Congo)
12 December 2013

Cameroon	2-1	Equatorial Guinea
57', 67' Makon		31' Peque

Referee: Mahamat Alhadj Allaou (Chad)
15 December 2013

Gabon	2-1	Equatorial Guinea
5', 71' Cousin		27' Fidjeu

Referee: Jean Marie Koyakobo (Central Africa)

=== Group B ===
Team	Pts	Pld	W	D	L	GF	GA
Central African Republic	4	2	1	1	0	1	0
Congo	4	2	1	1	0	1	0
Chad	0	2	0	0	2	0	2

11 December 2013

Chad	0-1	Congo
		27' Ndey

Referee: Juenkou Wandji (Cameroon)
13 December 2013

Central African Republic	1-0	Chad
7' Limane

Referee: Yves Roponat Mbourou (Gabon)
16 December 2013

Congo	0-0	Central African Republic
Penalties
	4 – 5

Referee: Esono Eyang (Equatorial Guinea)

== Knockout stage ==
=== Semi-finals ===
18 December 2013

Gabon	1-0	Congo
Daniel Cousin

Referee: Mahamat Alhadj Allaou (Chad)
18 December 2013

Central African Republic	2-2 (a.e.t.)	Cameroon
Penalties
	4-3

Bitam (Gabon)
Referee: Yves Roponat Mbourou (Gabon)

=== 3rd-place play-off ===
20 December 2013

Congo	2-1	Cameroon
Kololory (18'), (45+1')

Francheville (Gabon)

=== Final ===
21 December 2013

Gabon	2-0	Central African Republic
Bonaventure Sokambi (33'), Daniel Cousin (75')

Referee: Esono Eyang (Equatorial Guinea)

== Individual scorers ==
4 goals

- (Gabon) Daniel Cousin

2 goals

- (Cameroon) Thierry Makon

1 goal

- (Central African Republic) Moussa Limane
- (Republic of the Congo) Rudy Ndey
- (Equatorial Guinea) Peque
- (Equatorial Guinea) Thierry Fidjeu
- (Gabon) Edmond Mouele
- (Gabon) Bonaventure Sokambi
- (Gabon) Lionel Yacouya

Own goals

- (Cameroon) Thierry Makon (for Gabon)
