= Erwin Nguéma Obame =

Gabonese footballer

Erwin Nguéma
Personal information
- Full name: Erwin Blynn Nguéma Obame
- Date of birth: 7 March 1989 (age 37)
- Place of birth: Bitam, Gabon
- Height: 1.84 m (6 ft 1/2 in)
- Position: Defender

Team information
- Current team: US Bitam
- Number: 29

Youth career
- 2001–2006: US Bitam

Senior career*
Years	Team	Apps	(Gls)
2007–	US Bitam	50	(1)
2009–2010	→ Cotonsport Garoua (loan)	7	(1)

International career
2004–2007	Gabon U-20	25	(1)
2007–	Gabon	5	(0)
- * Club domestic league appearances and goals

Erwin Blynn Nguéma Obame (born 7 March 1989) is a Gabonese football player who currently plays for US Bitam.

== Career ==
Obame began his career with US Bitam and signed than in summer 2009 for Cameroonian top club Cotonsport Garoua.

== International career ==
He was part of the Gabon national football team at 2010 African Cup of Nations in Angola.
