= Mbilinga FC =

Mbilinga
- Full name: Mbilinga FC
- Ground: Stade Pierre Claver Divounguy; Port-Gentil, Gabon
- Capacity: 7,000
- Chairman: ?
- Manager: ?
- League: Gabon Championnat National D1

Mbilinga FC is a Gabonese football club based in Port-Gentil, Ogooué-Maritime province. They play in the Gabon Championnat National D2.

In 1996 the team has won Gabon Championnat National D1.

== Achievements ==
- Gabon Championnat National D1: 1

1996

== Stadium ==
Currently the team plays at the Stade Pierre Claver Divounguy.

== Performance in CAF competitions ==
- CAF Champions League: 2 appearances

1995 African Cup of Champions Clubs – First Round
1997 CAF Champions League
