= AC Bongoville =

- Full name: AC Bongoville
- Ground: Stade de Bongoville; Bongoville, Gabon
- Capacity: 2,500
- League: Gabon Championnat National D1

AC Bongoville is a Gabonese football club based in Bongoville, Gabon. The club plays in Gabon Championnat National D1.

== History ==
It started as Racing Club de Masuku. As a result of management changes, the club moved to Bongoville and was renamed AC Bongoville. In its first season 2008–2009 in the Gabon Championnat National D1, it finished 9th in the league. Later on, the club slipped to Division 2. But after winning the championship of Gabon Championnat National D2 in 2011, the club moved back to Division 1 of the Gabonese league starting season 2011–2012.

Beninese player Sylvain Azougoui, the long-time goalkeeper of the club, died on 20 April 2014 during a game between AC Bongoville and Centre Mberi Sportif held in Bongoville when Sanogo, an attacker from the rival Centre Mberi Sportif accidentally kicked him in the head during a division 1 league game between the two teams. Azougoui died on his way to hospital.
