= US Oyem =

Association football club in Gabon

- Full name: Union Sportive d'Oyem
- Founded: 2002
- Ground: Stade d'Akouakam, Oyem, Gabon
- Capacity: 4,000
- Chairman: Pascal Mpatso
- Manager: Étienne Bwaliko
- League: Gabon Championnat National D1
- 2026: 7th
Home colours	Away colours

Union Sportive d'Oyem is a Gabonese football club based in Oyem, Woleu-Ntem province, playing the top division of Gabonese football, the Gabon Championnat National D1. They play at Stade d'Akouakam. The stadium has capacity of 4,000 spectators.

The club's colours are white and red.
