= En Avant Estuaire FC =

- Full name: En Avant Estuaire FC
- Founded: 2002
- Ground: Stade Omar Bongo
- Capacity: 41,000
- 2011–12: Division 2
Home colours	Away colours

En Avant Estuaire FC, is a Gabonese football club based in Libreville.

The club's colours are blue and white.

It was founded in 1986 in the capital, Libreville, under the name Delta Sports. Since then, the club has changed its name several times, including:

== Chronology of names ==
Name	Period
Delta Sports	1986–2003
Delta Telstar Gabon Téléstar FC	2003–2009
En Avant Estuaire FC	2009–present

== Achievements ==
- UNIFFAC Clubs Cup: 1

2005

- Coupe du Gabon Interclubs: 1

2006
