= AS Stade Mandji =

Association football club in Gabon

- Full name: Association Sportive Stade Mandji
- Founded: 1962; 64 years ago
- Ground: Stade Pierre Claver Divounguy; Port-Gentil, Gabon
- Capacity: 7,000
- Chairman: Jean-Claude Yenot
- Manager: Alain Mandrault
- League: Gabon Championnat National D1
- 2026: 2nd
| Home colours | Away colours |

Association Sportive Stade Mandji is a Gabonese football club founded in 1962 and based in Port-Gentil, Ogooué-Maritime province. They play at Stade Pierre Claver Divounguy.

== Honours ==
- Gabon Championnat National D1: 2

2009, 2022

- Coupe du Gabon Interclubs: 2

1978, 1979

- Super Coupe du Gabon: 0

== Performance in CAF competitions ==
- CAF Champions League: 1 appearance

2010 – Preliminary Round

== Current squad ==
Note: Flags indicate national team as defined under FIFA eligibility rules; some limited exceptions apply. Players may hold more than one non-FIFA nationality.

| No. | Pos. | Nation | Player |
|---|---|---|---|
| — | GK | GAB | Schultz Lounkalaba |
| — | GK | GAB | Paulin Nzambi |
| — | GK | GAB | Saturnin Okogo |
| — | DF | GAB | Patrick Mefang |
| — | DF | GAB | Freddy Kogbe |
| — | DF | GAB | Rodrigue Nguema |
| — | DF | GAB | Serge Ekambi |
| — | DF | GAB | Stéphane Owanga |
| — | DF | GAB | Gildas Ndoumou |
| — | MF | GAB | Stevy Na Nze |
| — | MF | GAB | Jonas Ogandaga |
| — | MF | GAB | Anges Onanga |
| — | MF | MLI | Adama Diallo |

| No. | Pos. | Nation | Player |
|---|---|---|---|
| — | MF | CMR | Victor Ndjon |
| — | MF | GAB | Xavier Ngayidoula |
| — | MF | GAB | Danny Ngozo |
| — | MF | GAB | Gael Pototou |
| — | FW | GAB | Laurent Mba |
| — | FW | GAB | Serge Mabiala |
| — | FW | GAB | Sosthène Youndji |
| — | FW | GAB | Stency Pendy Mabia |
| — | FW | GAB | Romaric Rogombe Daga |
| — | FW | GAB | Hugues Loubaki |
| — | FW | GAB | Steevy Nzamba |
| — | FW | GAB | Karl Aboghe Nze |
