= Sogéa FC =

Association football club in Gabon

- Full name: Sogéa Football Club Libreville
- Founded: 1993
- Ground: Stade Augustin Monédan de Sibang; Libreville, Gabon
- Capacity: 7,000
- Chairman: (Gabon) Jérôme Claude Asseko
- League: Gabon Championnat National D1
- 2013–14: 13th
Home colours	Away colours

Sogéa FC is a Gabonese football club based in Libreville, that competes in the Gabon Championnat National D1.

== Performance in CAF competitions ==
- CAF Confederation Cup: 1 appearance

2006 – First Round

== Current Squad 2011–12 ==
Note: Flags indicate national team as defined under FIFA eligibility rules; some limited exceptions apply. Players may hold more than one non-FIFA nationality.

No.	Pos.	Nation	Player
—	GK	(Gabon) GAB	Nick Moundounga
—	GK	(Cameroon) CMR	Gnassa
—	GK	(Gabon) GAB	Loussoueke Mouketou
—	DF	(Gabon) GAB	Ndong Mba Emmanuel
—	DF	(Gabon) GAB	Farel Mounguengui
—	DF	(Gabon) GAB	Gildas Ontsoussou
—	DF	(Gabon) GAB	Okali Christian
—	DF	(Gabon) GAB	Wilfred Akoukou Nze
—	DF	(Gabon) GAB	René Nsi Akoue
—	DF	(Gabon) GAB	Michel Mbatchi Ngoma
—	DF	(Gabon) GAB	Thibault Tchikaya
—	DF	(Gabon) GAB	Armel Bouassa
—	DF	(Gabon) GAB	Daouda Mouanganga

No.	Pos.	Nation	Player
—	DF	(Gabon) GAB	Lebrin Sita Milandou
—	DF	(Gabon) GAB	Paolo Nzoughe
—	MF	(Gabon) GAB	Cédric Moubamba
—	MF	(Gabon) GAB	Alain Djissikadie
—	MF	(Gabon) GAB	Fabrice Minko
—	MF	(Gabon) GAB	Belistaire Lakou
—	MF	(Gabon) GAB	Hans Bivaghe
—	MF	(Gabon) GAB	Serge Mbavu
—	MF	(Gabon) GAB	Landry Dkimbi
—	MF	(Gabon) GAB	Yves Bilong Asseko
—	FW	(Gabon) GAB	Allouh Hugues
—	FW	(Gabon) GAB	Jérémie Etonde Etonde
—	FW	(Gabon) GAB	Akame Mathieu
