= Stade Omar Bongo =

Stadium in Libreville, Gabon

Coordinates: 0°23′30.5″N 9°27′7.8″E

Stade Omnisport Président Omar Bongo Ondimba
- Interactive map of Stade Omnisport Président Omar Bongo Ondimba
- Location: Libreville, Gabon
- Owner: Government of Libreville
- Capacity: 41,000 (after renovation works are complete)

Tenants
- FC 105 Libreville; Gabon national football team

Stade Omar Bongo is a multi-purpose stadium in Libreville, Gabon. It is currently used mostly for football matches. It serves as the home ground of FC 105 Libreville. The stadium has a capacity of 41,000 and is named after Omar Bongo, who was President of Gabon from 1967 to 2009.
