= Cercle Mbéri Sportif =

- Full name: Cercle Mbéri Sportif FC
- Founded: 1996
- Ground: Stade Augustin Monédan de Sibang; Libreville, Gabon
- Capacity: 7,000
- Chairman: Pierre Bwanzua
- Manager: Moussa Latoundji
- League: Gabon Championnat National D1
- 2026: 5th
Home colours	Away colours	Third colours

Cercle Mbéri Sportif is a Gabonese football club based in Libreville, Gabon.

The club currently plays in Gabon Championnat National D1

== Stadium ==
Currently the team plays at the 7,000 capacity Stade Augustin Monédan de Sibang.

== Performance in CAF competitions ==
- CAF Champions League: 1 appearance

2020 – Preliminary Round

- CAF Confederation Cup: 0 appearance
