= Stade Augustin Monédan de Sibang =

Stadium in Libreville, Gabon

Coordinates: 0°24′58″N 9°28′02″E

The Stade Augustin Monédan de Sibang is a stadium primarily used for football matches in Libreville, Gabon. It is the home of the Gabonese teams Sogéa FC, Missile FC, and Cercle Mbéri Sportif of the Gabon Championnat National D1. The stadium has capacity to 7,000 people.
