= AS Pélican =

Gabonese football club

- Full name: Association Sportive Pélican
- Founded: 1980
- Ground: Stade Jean Koumou, Lambaréné, Gabon
- Manager: Médard Lisadusu
- League: Gabon Championnat National D1
- 2026: 10th
Home colours

Association Sportive Pélican or AS Pélican for short is a Gabonese football club based in Lambaréné. They play at the Stade Jean Koumou.

== Honours ==
- Coupe du Gabon
  - Runners-up (1): 2011
