= Akanda FC =

- Full name: Akanda Football Club
- Founded: 2010
- Ground: Stade Augustin Monédan de Sibang; Libreville, Gabon
- Capacity: 7,000
- Manager: Patrice Andomo
- League: Gabon Championnat National D1
Home colours	Away colours

Akanda Football Club (formerly Sapins Football Club, French: Club de football d'Akhanda) is a Gabonese football club based in Libreville, Gabon. The club plays in the highest level league of Gabon – Gabon Championnat National D1.
