= National Foot 1 =

Gabonese association football league

Championnat National D1
- Founded: 1968
- Country: Gabon
- Confederation: CAF
- Number of clubs: 14
- Level on pyramid: 1
- Domestic cup: Coupe du Gabon Interclubs
- International cup(s): Champions League; Confederation Cup
- Current champions: AS Mangasport (2026)
- Most championships: FC 105 Libreville and AS Mangasport (11)
- Website: les-pantheres.com/fegafoot (archived)
- Current: 2026 Gabon Championnat National D1

Gabon Championnat National D1 is the top division of the Gabonese Football Federation, it was created in 1968.

== Gabon Championnat National D1 Clubs – 2025-26 ==
Locations of the 2025–26 National Foot 1 clubs

National Foot 1 teams and stadiums
Team	Location	Stadium
AS Mangasport	Moanda	Stade Henri Sylvoz
AS Stade Mandji	Port-Gentil	Stade Pierre Claver Divoungui
Ogooué FC	Franceville	Stade de Mbaya
Oyem AC	Oyem	Stade d'Akouakam
AO Centre Mbérie Sportif	Libreville	Stade Augustin Monédan de Sibang
FC 105	Owendo	Stade Idriss Ngari
Vautour Club	Libreville	Stade Augustin Monédan de Sibang
US Oyem	Oyem	Stade d'Akouakam
Stade Migovéen	Lambaréné	Stade Jean Nkoumou
Lambaréné AC	Lambaréné	Stade Jean Nkoumou
AS Lozo-Sport	Lastoursville	Stade Municipal Tata Migolet
US Bitam	Bitam	Stade Gaston Peyrille
AO Bouenguidi Sports	Koulamoutou	Stade Municipal Tata Migolet
AS Dikaki	Fougamou	Stade Mbombet

== Previous winners ==
- 1968: Olympique Sportif (Libreville)
- 1969: Aigle Royal (Libreville)
- 1970–71: Aigle Royal (Libreville)
- 1971–72: Solidarité (Libreville)
- 1972–73: Olympique Sportif (Libreville)
- 1973–74: Police (Libreville)
- 1974–75: Zalang (Libreville)
- 1975–76: Petrosport (Port Gentil)
- 1976–77: Vantour Mangoungou (Libreville)
- 1977–78: Vantour Mangoungou (Libreville)
- 1978–79: ASMO/FC 105 (Libreville)
- 1979: Anges (Libreville)
- 1980: USM Libreville
- 1981: USM Libreville
- 1982: ASMO/FC 105
- 1983: ASMO/FC 105
- 1983–84: Sogara (Port Gentil)
- 1985: ASMO/FC 105
- 1986: ASMO/FC 105
- 1986–87: ASMO/FC 105
- 1987–88: USM Libreville
- 1988–89: Sogara (Port Gentil)
- 1989–90: JAC (Libreville)
- 1990–91: Sogara (Port Gentil)
- 1991–92: Sogara (Port Gentil)
- 1993: Sogara (Port Gentil)
- 1994: Sogara (Port Gentil)
- 1995: Mangasport
- 1996: Mbilinga (Port Gentil)
- 1997: FC 105 Libreville
- 1998: FC 105 Libreville
- 1999: FC 105 Libreville
- 2000: Mangasport
- 2001: FC 105 Libreville
- 2002: USM Libreville
- 2003: Bitam
- 2004: Mangasport
- 2005: Mangasport
- 2006: Mangasport
- 2006–07: FC 105 Libreville
- 2007–08: Mangasport
- 2008–09: Stade Mandji
- 2009–10: Bitam
- 2010–11: Missile
- 2011–12: Mounana
- 2012–13: Bitam
- 2013–14: Mangasport
- 2014–15: Mangasport
- 2015–16: CF Mounana
- 2016–17: CF Mounana
- 2017–18: Mangasport
- 2018–19: Cercle Mbéri Sportif
- 2019–20: Abandoned
- 2022: Stade Mandji
- 2024–25: Mangasport
- 2026: Mangasport

== Performance By Club ==
Club	City	Titles	Last title
FC 105 Libreville (Includes ASMO/FC 105)	Libreville	11	2006–07
Mangasport	Moanda	10	2024-25
Sogara	Port Gentil	6	1994
USM Libreville	Libreville	4	2002
Bitam	Bitam	3	2012–13
Mounana	Libreville	3	2016–17
Stade Mandji	Port-Gentil	2	2022
Aigle Royal	Libreville	2	1970–71
Olympique Sportif	Libreville	2	1972–73
Vantour Mangoungou	Libreville	2	1977–78
Cercle Mbéri Sportif	Libreville	1	2018–19
Anges	Libreville	1	1979
JAC	Libreville	1	1989–90
Mbilinga	Port Gentil	1	1996
Missile	Libreville	1	2010–11
Petrosport	Port Gentil	1	1975–76
Police	Libreville	1	1973–74
Solidarité	Libreville	1	1971–72
Zalang	Libreville	1	1974–75

== Top goalscorers ==
Year		Best scorers	Team	Goals
1978	(Gabon)	Tapoyo Endeng		5
1986	(Guinea)	Seydouba Bangoura		14
1986		Macaty Camara		14
1988		Abdul Aziz		17
1993–94	(Gabon)	Godfrey Chitalu	Mangasport	11
2001	(Gabon)	Yannick Larry	105	25
2007	(Gabon)	Evrard-Yannick Lary	105	25
2007–08	(Gabon)	Vianney Mabidé	Mangasport	11
2013-14	(Senegal)	Ablaye Mbengue	Akanda	15
2015	(Chad)	Casimir Ninga	Mangasport	10
2015-16	(Gabon)	Dorian Allen Nono	Pélican	19
2016-17	(Chad)	Hassane Brahim	Mangasport	16
2022-23	(Gabon)	Cédric Mandjel	CMS	10

== Hat-tricks ==
Player	For	Against	Score	Date
(Gabon) Dorian Allen Nono	Pelican	Port Gentil	3–3	5 December 2015
(Gabon) Junior Mensah	Stade Mandji	Nguen'Asuku	3–1	30 December 2015
(Gabon) Dorian Allen Nono	Pelican	Olimpique Mandji	2–3	30 December 2015
(Togo) Kodjo Laba	Bitam	Stade Migoveen	1–3	13 February 2016
(Senegal) El Hadji Adama Mbaye	Mangasport	Stade Migoveen	1–4	12 March 2016
(Senegal) Sall Papa Serigne	CMS	Olimpique Mandji	6–2	18 June 2016
(Gabon) Cédric Ondo	Mounana	Adouma	1–4	26 November 2016
(Gabon) Roy Ndoutoumou	Mangasport	Olimpique Mandji	3–0	10 December 2016
(Senegal) Malé Diallo^{4}	CMS	Stade Migoveen	0–4	25 December 2016
(Cameroon) Philippe Ebonde Ebongue	Lozo Sport	Olimpique Mandji	5–0	25 February 2017

== Sources ==
- List of Champions
