= CF Mounana =

Gabonese football club

- Full name: Centre de formation de Mounana
- Founded: November 2006; 18 years ago
- Ground: Stade Augustin Monédan de Sibang; Libreville, Gabon
- Capacity: 7,000
- Chairman: Hervé Patrick Opiangah
- Manager: Kevin Ibinga
- League: Gabon Championnat National D1
- 2024–25: 12th

The Centre de Formation de Mounana, also known as CF Mounana, is a Gabonese football club based in Mounana.

== History ==
CF Mounana won the Gabonese national Championship for the first time in 2012.

== Honours ==
=== National ===
- Gabon Championnat National D1
  - Winners (3): 2011–12, 2015–16, 2016–17
- Coupe du Gabon Interclubs
  - Winners (3): 2013, 2015, 2016

== Current squad ==
Note: Flags indicate national team as defined under FIFA eligibility rules; some limited exceptions apply. Players may hold more than one non-FIFA nationality.

No.	Pos.	Nation	Player
—	GK	(Gabon) GAB	William Loussoueke
—	GK	(Gabon) GAB	Gesril Andome
—	GK	(Gabon) GAB	Patrick Menene
—	DF	(Gabon) GAB	Henri Chico Sassou
—	DF	(Gabon) GAB	Aimé Mboungui
—	DF	(Gabon) GAB	Oumar Doumbia
—	DF	(Ivory Coast) CIV	Nabi Ibrahim Kone
—	DF	(Gabon) GAB	Eric Ilamba
—	DF	(Gabon) GAB	Ralph Bamba
—	MF	(Gabon) GAB	Jerry Nzamba

No.	Pos.	Nation	Player
—	MF	(Gabon) GAB	Léon Brice Nkori
—	MF	(Gabon) GAB	Léonard Thierry Nkori
—	MF	(Gabon) GAB	Joel Musingu Mazowa
—	MF	(Gabon) GAB	Samaké Nzé
—	MF	(Gabon) GAB	Emmanuel Ndong Mba
—	FW	(Gabon) GAB	Bonaventure Sokambi
—	FW	(Gabon) GAB	Allen Nono

== League and domestic cup history ==
Season	League									Gabon Cup	Top goalscorer	
Season	Div.	Pos.	Pl.	W	D	L	GS	GA	P	Gabon Cup	Name	League
2010–11	1st	5	26						39			
2011–12	1st	1	26	17	6	3	40	20	57	not held		
2012–13	1st	2	26	13	8	5	37	20	47	Winners		

== Performance in CAF competitions ==
As of 2 May 2015

Competition	Matches	W	D	L	GF	GA
CAF Champions League	2	1	0	1	1	2
CAF Confederation Cup	8	4	1	3	17	13
Total	10	5	1	4	18	15

Season	Competition	Round	Country	Club	Home	Away	Aggregate
2013	CAF Champions League	PR	(Republic of the Congo)	AC Léopards	1–0	0–2	1–2
2014	CAF Confederation Cup	PR	(Angola)	Desportivo da Huíla	3–1	0–3	3–4
2015	CAF Confederation Cup	PR	(Zanzibar)	Polisi SC	5–0	3–1	8–1
2015	CAF Confederation Cup	1R	(Zambia)	Power Dynamos	4–0	0–3	4–3
2015	CAF Confederation Cup	2R	(South Africa)	Orlando Pirates	2–2	0–3	2–5
