= USM Libreville =

- Full name: Union Sportive O'Mbila Nziami Libreville
- Founded: 1978
- Ground: Stade Omar Bongo, Libreville, Gabon
- Capacity: 45,000
- Chairman: (Gabon) Jean Boniface Assele
- Manager: (Gabon) Anselme Delicat
- League: Gabon Championnat National D1
- 2013–14: 8th
Home colours	Away colours

Union Sportive O'Mbila Nziami Libreville is a Gabonese football club based in Libreville, Gabon.

== Achievements ==
- Gabon Championnat National D1: 4

1980, 1981, 1988, 2002

- Coupe du Gabon Interclubs: 4

1987, 1991, 2002, 2008

== Performance in CAF competitions ==
- CAF Champions League: 1 appearance

2003 – First Round

- African Cup of Champions Clubs: 2 appearances

1981 – Quarter-finals
1982 – Second Round

- CAF Confederation Cup: 2 appearances

2004 – First Round
2009 – First Round

- CAF Cup Winners' Cup: 4 appearances

1980 – Second Round
1987 – Second Round
1988 – First Round
1992 – Quarter-finals

== Current Squad 2008–09 ==
Note: Flags indicate national team as defined under FIFA eligibility rules; some limited exceptions apply. Players may hold more than one non-FIFA nationality.

No.	Pos.	Nation	Player
—	GK	(Cameroon) CMR	Alain Sandjong
—	GK	(Gabon) GAB	Willy Mikiela
—	DF	(Gabon) GAB	Didier Koutouzi
—	DF	(Gabon) GAB	Dimitri Akila
—	DF	(Cameroon) CMR	Aldo Mbou-Banda
—	DF	(Gabon) GAB	Henri Nze Akila
—	DF	(Gabon) GAB	Junior Mombo
—	DF	(Gabon) GAB	Arnaud Didoungou
—	MF	(Gabon) GAB	Guy Nguema Edou
—	MF	(Gabon) GAB	Gildas Nyaba
—	MF	(Gabon) GAB	Eric Mombo

No.	Pos.	Nation	Player
—	MF	(Gabon) GAB	Parfait Poaty
—	MF	(Gabon) GAB	Donald Nguema
—	MF	(Gabon) GAB	Karl Nganga
—	MF	(Gabon) GAB	Eric Mintsa Biyo'o
—	MF	(Gabon) GAB	Lionel Mavoungou
—	FW	(Gabon) GAB	Junior Nkouany
—	FW	(Gabon) GAB	Verlaine Malamda
—	FW	(Gabon) GAB	Arnold Yembi
—	FW	(Gabon) GAB	Dany Mibimou
—	FW	(Gabon) GAB	Donatien Ndong
