= US Bitam =

Association football club in Gabon

- Full name: Union Sportive de Bitam
- Nickname: USB
- Founded: 1947; 79 years ago
- Ground: Stade Gaston Peyrille, Bitam, Gabon
- Capacity: 7,000
- Chairman: (Gabon) André Bertrand Ombagho
- Manager: (Cameroon) François Omam-Biyik
- League: Gabon Championnat National D1
- 2026: 12th
| Home colours | Away colours |

Union Sportive de Bitam is a Gabonese professional association football club based in Bitam, Gabon, that competes in the Gabon Championnat National D1.

== Achievements ==
- Gabon Championnat National D1
  - Champions (3): 2003, 2010, 2013
- Coupe du Gabon Interclubs
  - Winners (3): 1999, 2003, 2010

== Performance in CAF competitions ==
- CAF Champions League: 3 appearances

2004 – First Round
2011 – First Round
2014 – Preliminary Round

- CAF Cup Winners' Cup: 1 appearance

2000 – First Round

== Current squad ==
Note: Flags indicate national team as defined under FIFA eligibility rules; some limited exceptions apply. Players may hold more than one non-FIFA nationality.

| No. | Pos. | Nation | Player |
|---|---|---|---|
| 1 | GK | GAB | Alain Lebondo Anda |
| 2 | DF | GAB | Bernard Obiang |
| 3 | DF | GAB | Loic Minko |
| 4 | DF | GAB | Erwin Nguéma |
| 5 | DF | GAB | Roger Issakunia |
| 7 | DF | GAB | Claude Mve Minto’o |
| 8 | FW | GAB | Roguy Méyé |
| 9 | FW | CMR | Ebonde Ebongué |
| 10 | MF | NGA | David Tyavkase |
| 11 | FW | CIV | Goué Blagnon |
| 12 | DF | GAB | Henry Joël Eyame |
| 14 | FW | GAB | Axel Méyé |
| 15 | MF | COD | David Massamba |

| No. | Pos. | Nation | Player |
|---|---|---|---|
| 16 | GK | GAB | Yves Bitséki |
| 17 | DF | GAB | Emmanuel Ndong |
| 18 | MF | GAB | Roosevelt Reckwangue |
| 20 | MF | GAB | Lionel Yacouya |
| 21 | DF | GAB | Kobe Freddy |
| 22 | GK | GAB | Fabien Ovono |
| 23 | FW | MLI | Abdoulaye Coulibaly |
| 24 | MF | GAB | Jerry Obiang |
| 25 | MF | GAB | Lilian Bikoro |
| 26 | DF | GAB | Ismaël Abogo |
| 28 | FW | CIV | Franck Guedegbé |
| 30 | FW | GAB | Junior Bayanho |

== Coaches ==
- (Cameroon) Emmanuel Kunde (1999–00; 2000–06)
- (Gabon) Régis Manon (2006–12)
- (Cameroon) Thomas Libiih (2013)
- (Cameroon) François Omam-Biyik (2013–2019)
