= FC 105 Libreville =

Gabonese football club

- Full name: Football Canon 105 de Libreville
- Founded: 1975; 51 years ago
- Ground: Stade Idriss Ngari; Owendo, Gabon
- Capacity: 5,000
- Chairman: Lucien Nazaire Apanga
- Manager: Lucien Guillaume Bolunga
- League: Gabon Championnat National D1
- 2026: 8th
| Home colours | Away colours |

Football Canon (FC) 105 de Libreville is a Gabonese professional football club based in Libreville. It was founded in 1975 as the club of the army and the police. FC 105 play at the 5,000-capacity Stade Idriss Ngari in Owendo. They often play home games in front of hundreds of spectators.

== Achievements ==
- Gabon Championnat National D1: 11

1978, 1982, 1983, 1985, 1986, 1987, 1997, 1998, 1999, 2001, 2007

- Coupe du Gabon Interclubs: 5

1984, 1986, 1996, 2004, 2009

- Super Coupe du Gabon: 1

2007

== Performance in CAF competitions ==
- CAF Champions League: 5 appearances

1998 – Second Round
1999 – First Round
2000 – First Round
2002 – First Round
2008 – First Round

- African Cup of Champions Clubs: 6 appearances

1979 – First Round
1983 – First Round
1984 – disqualified in Second Round
1986 – First Round
1987 – First Round
1988 – Quarter-Finals

- CAF Confederation Cup: 2 appearances

2005 – Group Stage
2010 – First Round

- CAF Cup: 4 appearances

1992 – Quarter-Finals
1996 – First Round
2001 – First Round
2003 – Second Round

- CAF Cup Winners' Cup: 5 appearances

1978 – First Round
1981 – Second Round
1982 – Second Round
1985 – Second Round
1997 – Second Round
