= AS Mangasport =

- Full name: Association Sportive Mangasport
- Founded: 1962; 64 years ago
- Ground: Stade Henri Sylvoz, Moanda, Gabon
- Capacity: 4,000
- Chairman: (Gabon) Didier Ngayoro
- Manager: (Democratic Republic of the Congo) Médard Lisadusu
- League: Gabon Championnat National D1
- 2026: Champions
Home colours

Association Sportive Mangasport, abbreviated AS Mangasport, is a Gabonese football club based in Moanda. It was founded in 1962. They play at the Stade Henri Sylvoz.

== Achievements ==
- Gabon Championnat National D1: 11

1995, 2000, 2004, 2005, 2006, 2008, 2014, 2015, 2018, 2024–25, 2026.

- Coupe du Gabon Interclubs: 6

1964, 1994, 2001, 2005, 2007, 2011.

- Super Coupe du Gabon: 3

1994, 2001, 2006.

== Performance in CAF competitions ==
- CAF Champions League: 5 appearances

2001 – Preliminary Round
2005 – Preliminary Round
2006 – Preliminary Round
2007 – First Round
2009 – First Round
25/26 - First Round

- African Cup of Champions Clubs: 1 appearance

1996 – First Round

- CAF Confederation Cup: 1 appearance

2012 – Preliminary Round

- CAF Cup: 1 appearance

1997 – First Round

- CAF Cup Winners' Cup: 2 appearances

1995 – First Round
2002 – Second Round

== Current squad ==
Note: Flags indicate national team as defined under FIFA eligibility rules; some limited exceptions apply. Players may hold more than one non-FIFA nationality.

No.	Pos.	Nation	Player
—	GK	GAB	Nick Moundounga
—	GK	GAB	Laurhian Kantsouga
—	DF	GAB	Edmond Mouele
—	DF	GAB	Martin Ndong Essono
—	MF	GAB	Ngame Essono

No.	Pos.	Nation	Player
—	MF	GAB	Serge Mbavu
—	MF	GAB	Romuald Tsitsigui
—	FW	GAB	Pitty Djoué
—	FW	GAB	Johan Lengoualama
—	FW	GAB	Romuald Ntsitsigui
