= Missile FC =

Gabonese association football club

- Full name: Missile Football Club
- Founded: 2003; 23 years ago
- Ground: Stade Monédang de Sibang; Libreville, Gabon
- Capacity: 7,000
- Chairman: Marc Sossa Simawango
- League: Gabon Championnat National D1
- 2026: 2nd of 8 (promoted)

Missile FC is a football (soccer) club from Gabon based in the capital Libreville.

== Achievements ==
- Gabon Championnat National D1: 1

2010–11

== Performance in CAF competitions ==
- CAF Champions League: 1 appearance

2012 – Preliminary Round

- CAF Confederation Cup: 1 appearance

2011 – First Round of 16
