= 2016–17 Gabon Championnat National D1 =

Gabon Championnat National D1
- Season: 2016–17
- Matches: 134
- Goals: 332 (2.48 per match)
- Biggest home win: Mangasport 8−1 FC 105 (10 December 2016)
- Biggest away win: Stade Migovéen 0−4 Cercle Mbéri (25 December 2016)
- Highest scoring: Mangasport 8−1 FC 105 (10 December 2016)
- Longest winning run: Mangasport (9)
- Longest unbeaten run: Mounana (11)
- Longest winless run: Olympique de Mandji (14)
- Longest losing run: Olympique de Mandji (9)
- All statistics correct as of 19 May 2017.

The 2016–17 Gabon Championnat National D1 was the 49th season in top-flight football in Gabon. Mounana are the defending champions having won their second title.

== Participating teams ==
The league consists of 14 teams, including Adouma and Lozo, who were promoted from D2 for the 2016-17 season.

=== Stadia and locations ===
Locations of the 2016–17 Gabon Championnat National D1 teams.

Team	Home City	Stadium	Capacity	2015-16 Season
Adouma FC	Lastoursville			Championnat D2
Akanda FC	Libreville	Stade Augustin Monédan de Sibang	3,280	8th in Championnat D1
US Bitam	Bitam	Stade Gaston Peyrille	2,115	4th in Championnat D1
Cercle Mbéri Sportif	Owendo	Stade Idriss Ngari	5,000	7th in Championnat D1
FC 105 Libreville	Owendo	Stade Idriss Ngari	5,000	12th in Championnat D1
Lozo Sport	Lastoursville	Stade Mbéba	4,000	Championnat D2
AS Mangasport	Moanda	Stade Henri Sylvoz	9,500	2nd in Championnat D1
Missile FC	Libreville	Stade Augustin Monédan de Sibang	3,280	5th in Championnat D1
CF Mounana	Libreville	Stade de Nzeng Ayong	464	Championnat D1 Champions
Olympique de Mandji	Port-Gentil	Stade Pierre Claver Divounguy	3,932	11th in Championnat D1
Port-Gentil FC	Port-Gentil	Stade Pierre Claver Divounguy	3,932	9th in Championnat D1
AS Pélican	Lambaréné	Stade Jean Koumou	390	3rd in Championnat D1
AS Stade Mandji	Port-Gentil	Stade Pierre Claver Divounguy	3,932	6th in Championnat D1
Stade Migovéen	Lambaréné	Stade Jean Koumou	390	10th in Championnat D1

== League table ==
Pos	Team	Pld	W	D	L	GF	GA	GD	Pts	Qualification or relegation
1	Mounana (C)	25	19	3	3	49	18	+31	60	Qualification for 2018 CAF Champions League
2	Mangasport	25	19	1	5	49	13	+36	58	
3	Pélican	25	11	9	5	35	18	+17	42	
4	Cercle Mbéri	25	12	5	8	24	22	+2	41	
5	Akanda FC	25	11	7	7	36	24	+12	40	
6	Missile	25	10	3	12	30	33	−3	33	
7	Lozo Sport	25	8	6	11	30	36	−6	30	
8	Stade Mandji	25	7	8	10	25	30	−5	29	
9	Bitam	25	6	10	9	27	30	−3	28	
10	Stade Migovéen	25	6	9	10	25	38	−13	27	
11	Adouma FC	25	6	6	13	16	29	−13	24	
12	Olympique de Mandji	25	7	3	15	18	40	−22	24	
13	POG (R)	13	4	3	6	9	19	−10	15	Relegation to Gabon Championnat National D2
14	FC 105 (R)	25	1	11	13	21	44	−23	14	Relegation to Gabon Championnat National D2

Updated to match(es) played on 22 July 2017. Source: Soccerway
Rules for classification: 1) points; 2) goal difference; 3) goals scored; 4) head-to-head points; 5) head-to-head goal difference
(C) Champions; (R) Relegated

== Positions by round ==
Leader
Relegation to Championnat D2

Team ╲ Round	1	2	3	4	5	6	7	8	9	10	11	12	13	14	15	16	17	18	19	20	21	22	23	24	25	26
Mounana	1	1	1	1	1	1	1	1	1	1	1	1	1	1	1	1	1	1	1	1						
Mangasport	11	6	3	2	3	2	2	2	2	2	2	2	2	2	2	2	2	2	2	2						
Pélican	6	4	7	7	4	4	5	5	3	4	5	4	4	4	4	4	3	4	3							
Akanda	6	5	6	8	5	5	3	3	4	3	3	3	3	3	3	3	4	3	4							
Cercle Mbéri	14	13	9	9	12	8	8	9	8	5	4	6	5	5	5	5	5	5	5	5						
Lozo Sport	13	14	10	12	10	11	11	13	9	7	7	7	7	8	8	7	6	6	6	6						
Stade Mandji	6	11	13	11	9	10	12	8	6	8	6	5	6	6	6	6	7	7	7							
Bitam	10	10	11	13	11	12	7	6	7	9	9	10	8	7	7	8	8	8	8							
Missile	3	2	5	3	2	3	4	4	5	6	8	9	12	11	10	10	12	10	9							
Adouma	4	8	8	6	8	6	6	7	11	10	10	8	9	9	9	9	9	9	10							
Stade Migovéen	6	9	12	10	13	13	13	12	9	11	12	12	11	12	11	11	10	11	11							
POG	4	3	2	4	6	7	10	11	13	12	11	11	10	10	12	12	11	12	12							
FC 105	11	12	14	14	14	14	14	14	14	14	14	14	14	13	13	13	13	14	13							
Olympique de Mandji	2	6	4	5	7	9	9	10	12	13	13	13	13	14	14	14	14	13	14							

Updated to match(es) played on 19 May 2017. Source: Soccerway
