= 2018–19 Gabon Championnat National D1 =

Gabon Championnat National D1
- Season: 2018–19

The 2018–19 Gabon Championnat National D1 (known as Gabon Oil National Foot 1 for sponsorship reasons) was the 51st season in top-flight football in Gabon.

The competition began on 23 February 2019. Although the competition is scheduled to take place wholly within 2019, it is regarded as the 2018–19 season.

== Teams ==
Group A	Group B	Group C	Group D
CF Mounana; Akanda FC; Missile FC; Cercle Mbéri Sportif	AS Pélican; AS Stade Mandji; Olympique de Mandji; Stade Migovéen	US Bitam; Oyem Athletic Club; US Oyem	AS Dikaki; AS Mangasport; Lozo Sport

== First stage ==
The top two teams from Groups A and B and the top teams from Groups C and D advance to the Championship playoff.

=== Group A ===
Pos	Team	Pld	W	D	L	GF	GA	GD	Pts	Qualification or relegation
1	Cercle Mbéri Sportif	12	5	5	2	20	14	+6	20	Qualification for Championship playoff
2	Akanda FC	12	4	5	3	12	15	−3	17	Qualification for Championship playoff
3	CF Mounana	12	3	7	2	15	11	+4	16	
4	Missile FC	12	3	1	8	6	13	−7	10	Qualification for Relegation playoff

Source: Soccerway

=== Group B ===
Pos	Team	Pld	W	D	L	GF	GA	GD	Pts	Qualification or relegation
1	AS Pélican	12	8	3	1	18	3	+15	27	Qualification for Championship playoff
2	AS Stade Mandji	12	4	5	3	11	10	+1	17	Qualification for Championship playoff
3	Stade Migovéen	12	4	2	6	12	12	0	14	
4	Olympique de Mandji	12	1	4	7	5	21	−16	7	Qualification for Relegation playoff

Source: Soccerway

=== Group C ===
Pos	Team	Pld	W	D	L	GF	GA	GD	Pts	Qualification or relegation
1	US Bitam	8	3	4	1	12	6	+6	13	Qualification for Championship playoff
2	US Oyem	8	3	3	2	5	7	−2	12	
3	Oyem AC	8	1	3	4	4	8	−4	6	Qualification for Relegation playoff

Source: Soccerway

=== Group D ===
Pos	Team	Pld	W	D	L	GF	GA	GD	Pts	Qualification or relegation
1	AS Mangasport	8	4	2	2	5	4	+1	14	Qualification for Championship playoff
2	AS Dikaki	8	3	1	4	7	5	+2	10	
3	Lozo Sport	8	3	1	4	5	8	−3	10	Qualification for Relegation playoff

Source: Soccerway

== Championship playoff ==
Pos	Team	Pld	W	D	L	GF	GA	GD	Pts	Qualification or relegation
1	Cercle Mbéri Sportif (C)	5	4	1	0	4	0	+4	13	Qualification for Champions League
2	AS Pélican (Q)	5	2	2	1	6	4	+2	8	Qualification for Confederation Cup
3	AS Stade Mandji	5	2	1	2	3	3	0	7	
4	Akanda FC	5	1	3	1	5	5	0	6	
5	AS Mangasport	5	0	4	1	3	4	−1	4	
6	US Bitam	5	0	1	4	3	8	−5	1	

Source: Soccerway
(C) Champions; (Q) Qualified for the phase indicated

== Championship playoff clubs' stadiums ==
Team	Location	Stadium	Capacity
Akanda FC	Libreville	Stade Augustin Monédan de Sibang	7,000
AS Mangasport	Moanda	Stade Henri Sylvoz	4,000
AS Pélican	Lambaréné	Stade Jean Koumou	390
AS Stade Mandji	Port-Gentil	Stade Pierre Claver Divounguy	7,000
Cercle Mbéri Sportif	Libreville	Stade Augustin Monédan de Sibang	7,000
US Bitam	Bitam	Stade Gaston Peyrille	7,000
