= List of football stadiums in Gabon =

The following is a list of football stadiums in Gabon, ordered by capacity. Currently stadiums with a capacity of 4,000 or more are included, most stadiums in Gabon are dedicated for football (soccer), with some also used for other sports as well as other Cultural events.

== Current stadiums ==
#	Images	Stadium	Capacity	City	RF
1		Stade Omar Bongo	41,000	Libreville	
2		Stade d'Angondjé	40,000	Libreville	
3		Stade de Franceville	22,000	Franceville	
4		Stade d'Oyem	20,500	Oyem	
5		Stade de Port-Gentil	20,000	Port-Gentil	
6		Stade Pierre Claver Divounguy	7,000	Port-Gentil	
7		Stade Augustin Monédan de Sibang	7,000	Libreville	
8		Stade Gaston Peyrille	7,000	Bitam	
9		Stade Idriss Ngari	5,000	Owendo	
10		Stade Mbéba	4,000	Lastoursville	
11		Stade Henri Sylvoz	4,000	Moanda	

== See also ==
- Lists of stadiums
- List of association football stadiums by capacity
- List of African stadiums by capacity
- Football in Gabon
