= 2018 Gabon Championnat National D1 =

Gabon Championnat National D1
- Season: 2018
- Champions: AS Mangasport

The 2018 Gabon Championnat National D1 was the 50th season in top-flight football in Gabon.

The 2017–18 season was scheduled to start on 28 October 2017, but was postponed indefinitely. It eventually started on 20 January 2018. It ended on 13 June 2018 with the final.

== Standings ==
Final table (regular season finished after 10 rounds on 6 June 2018; top four advance to play-off).

Pos	Team	Pld	W	D	L	GF	GA	GD	Pts	Promotion, qualification or relegation
1	US Bitam (Q)	10	8	1	1	16	4	+12	25	Advance to Semi-Finals
2	Lozo Sport (Q)	10	5	4	1	21	7	+14	19	Advance to Semi-Finals
3	AS Mangasport (Q, C)	10	5	3	2	13	6	+7	18	Advance to Semi-Finals
4	Cercle Mbéri Sportif (Q)	10	4	6	0	13	7	+6	18	Advance to Semi-Finals
5	CF Mounana	10	3	7	0	9	5	+4	16	
6	Akanda FC	10	4	3	3	13	14	−1	15	
7	Olympique de Mandji	10	3	3	4	8	10	−2	12	
8	AS Pélican	10	2	5	3	10	8	+2	11	
9	AS Stade Mandji	10	3	2	5	12	14	−2	11	
10	Missile FC	10	3	2	5	6	8	−2	11	
11	Oyem Athletic Club	10	2	4	4	10	11	−1	10	
12	Stade Migovéen	10	2	2	6	7	16	−9	8	
13	Adouma FC (R)	10	1	4	5	3	17	−14	7	Relegation to Gabon Championnat National D2
14	Nguen'Asuku FC (R)	10	1	2	7	7	21	−14	5	Relegation to Gabon Championnat National D2

(C) Champions; (Q) Qualified for the phase indicated; (R) Relegated

== Semi-finals ==
10 June 2018

Lozo Sport FC 1-2 AS Mangasport

US Bitam 1-1 AO Cercle Mbéri Sportif [4-5 pen]

== Third place match ==
13 June 2018

US Bitam 6-0 Lozo Sport FC

== Final ==
13 June 2018

AO Cercle Mbéri Sportif 0-2 AS Mangasport

== Attendances ==
The league average was 204:

#	Club	Average
1	US Bitam	671
2	AS Mangasport	425
3	CF Mounana	262
4	Missile FC	233
5	Cercle Mbéri Sportif	179
6	Lozo Sport	161
7	Stade Mandji	138
8	AS Pélican	136
9	Olympique de Mandji	131
10	Akanda FC	129
11	Adouma FC	124
12	Stade Migovéen	108
13	Oyem AC	101
14	Nguen'Asuku FC	62
