= Francevillian B Formation =

Black shale named after Franceville, Gabon

- Stratigraphic range: Palaeoproterozoic (Rhyacian) 2140–2080 Ma
- Type: Geological formation
- Unit of: Francevillian Basin
- Area: 25,000 square kilometers (9,700 mi^{2})

Lithology
- Primary: Black Shale

Location
- Region: East-central Gabon
- Country: Gabon
- Extent: 35,000 kilometers (22,000 mi)

Type section
- Named for: Franceville, a nearby town
- Named by: Abderrazak El Albani
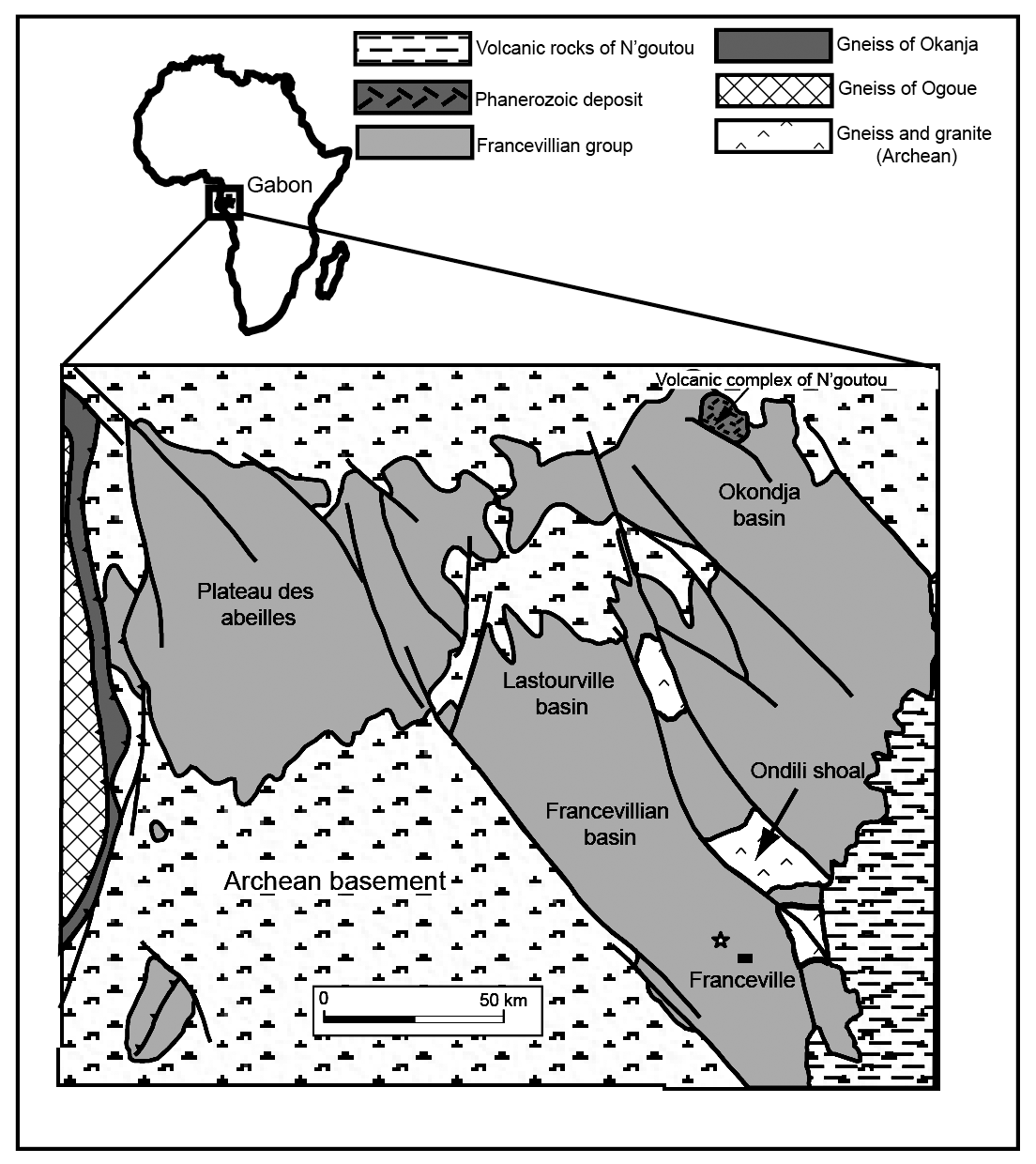
- Map of the Geology of the Franceville basin

The Francevillian B Formation, also known as the Francevillian Formation or FB2 in scientific research, is a geologic formation of black shale provinces close to the town of Franceville, Gabon from which it gets its name. The formation was deposited between 2.14-2.08 Ga (billion years ago) in the Palaeoproterozoic, and, uniquely, has not experienced any thermal overprinting due to diagenesis after burial nor significant metamorphism since it was deposited, unlike other formations deposited around the same time. The formation contains possible fossils, including the macroscopic "Francevillian Biota", which has been suggested by some authors to represent the oldest known multicellular organisms, though other authors have questioned the supposed biological origin of the structures, and have suggested that they may instead be inorganic, such as artifacts of diagenesis.

== Geology ==
The Francevillian Formation has recently been discovered to contain traces of uranium. The Francevillian basin itself already contained Oklo Mine, a natural nuclear reactor. However, the formation also witnessed a former system of petroleum which showed major amounts of uranium associated with organic matter. Several episodes of oil generation, migration and fluid mixing along with hydrofracturing are the cause of the uranium mineralization. During burial of the formation, its multiple black shales were heated and in doing so expelled hydrocarbons that migrated into underlying sandstones, with the first episode of the oil migration being synchronous along with a silicification event that derived into a hot and low salinity fluid which is proven by fluid inclusions trapped in overgrowths of quartz. However, the second episode of the oil migration was contemporaneous and has quartz dissolution with the episode being characterized by the mixing of hydrocarbons and oxidizing the uranium-bearing brine which in turn caused the precipitation of UO_{2} to be included in the oils. In the third and final episode of oil migration within the Francevillian B formation, oil-to-gas conversion generated overly-pressured gas trapped with uraniferous bitumen nodules in pores. Changes in the stress regime probably favoured radial hydrofracturing around the bitumen nodules as well as the subsequent development of a somewhat pervasive micro-fracture network.

== Possible fossils ==
The formation has been proposed to have preserved microfossils, as well as flattened disk-like macrofossils, the latter dubbed the "Francevillian biota". The initial discoverers have claimed that the large structures claimed to be fossils are the oldest known multicellular organisms and eukaryotes, while other authors are more skeptical, suggesting that they may be of inorganic origin, such as an artifact of diagenesis.

== See also ==
- Francevillian Biota
- Franceville basin
- Burgess Shale
- Oklo Mine
