= 2015–16 Gabon Championnat National D1 =

Gabon Championnat National D1
- Season: 2015–16

The 2015–16 Gabon Championnat National D1 was the 48th season in top-flight Gabonese football. AS Mangasport are the defending champions having won their eighth title.

== Participating teams ==
Fourteen teams competed in the 2015–16 season.

=== Stadia and locations ===
Locations of the 2015–16 Tanzanian Premier League teams.

Team	Stadium	Capacity
Bitam	Stade Gaston Peyrille	7,000
Cercle Mbéri Sportif	Stade Augustin Monédan de Sibang	7,000
Libreville	Stade Omar Bongo	30,000
Mangasport	Stade Henri Sylvoz	4,000
Missile	Stade Augustin Monédan de Sibang	7,000
Mounana	Stade Augustin Monédan de Sibang	7,000
Nguen'Asuku		
Olympique de Mandji		
Oyem	Stade d'Akouakam	4,000
Pélican	Stade Jean Koumou	
Port-Gentil	Stade Pierre Claver Divounguy	7,000
Stade Mandji	Stade Pierre Claver Divounguy	7,000
Stade Migoveen	Stade Jean Koumou	
Sapins	Stade Augustin Monédan de Sibang	7,000

== League table ==
Pos	Team	Pld	W	D	L	GF	GA	GD	Pts	Qualification or relegation
1	Mounana (C)	26	18	4	4	51	17	+34	58	Qualification for 2017 CAF Champions League
2	Mangasport	26	17	4	5	44	20	+24	55	
3	Pélican	26	13	8	5	40	26	+14	47	
4	Bitam	26	12	10	4	28	17	+11	46	
5	Missile	26	10	6	10	28	26	+2	36	
6	Stade Mandji	26	9	9	8	29	30	−1	36	
7	Cercle Mbéri Sportif	26	9	8	9	35	32	+3	35	
8	Sapins	26	8	9	9	26	24	+2	33	
9	Port-Gentil	26	6	14	6	27	26	+1	32	
10	Stade Migoveen	26	6	6	14	25	43	−18	24	
11	Olympique de Mandji	26	6	6	14	26	50	−24	24	
12	Libreville	26	3	13	10	20	29	−9	22	
13	Oyem (R)	26	5	7	14	22	36	−14	22	Relegation to Gabon Championnat National D2
14	Nguen'Asuku (R)	26	5	6	15	28	53	−25	21	Relegation to Gabon Championnat National D2

Updated to match(es) played on 3 March 2016. Source: Standings
Rules for classification: 1) points; 2) goal difference; 3) number of goals scored.
(C) Champions; (R) Relegated
