= Saturnin Ibela =

Gabonese football manager (born 1971)

Personal information
- Full name: Saturnin Ibela Ignambi
- Date of birth: 23 March 1971 (age 55)
- Place of birth: Gabon

Team information
- Current team: Gabon U23 (head coach)

Senior career*
Years	Team	Apps	(Gls)
- AS Mangasport
- USM Libreville

Managerial career
- 2017–2019: Gabon U17
- 2019–2020: AS Bouenguidi Sports
- 2020–2021: Djoliba AC
- 2022–2023: Gabon U23
- 2022–2023: Lozo Sport
- 2023–2024: Loto-Popo FC
- 2024: AS Bouenguidi Sports
- 2025: Oyem AC
- 2026: FC Tshikas
- 2026–: Gabon U23
- * Club domestic league appearances and goals

Saturnin Ibela Ignambi (born 23 March 1971) is a Gabonese football manager and former player who is the manager of the Gabon national under-23 football team.

== Playing career ==
Ibela was born on 23 March 1971 in Gabon. As a player, he played for Gabonese side AS Mangasport. After that, he signed for Gabonese side USM Libreville before starting his managerial career.

== Managerial career ==
Ibela has worked as a football coach since 1999. He has previously coached for USM Libreville, Club Sportif de Libreville, other clubs in Gabon, and Avenir Sportif d'Orly in France.

In 2016, Ibela obtained his Confederation of African Football A License. The 4–2–3–1 player formation has been regarded as his preferred player formation in management. In 2017, he was appointed manager of the Gabon national under-17 football team. He was the manager Gabonese football club AS Bouenguidi Sports from 2019 to 2020. On 28 December 2020, he was appointed manager of Malian Première Division side Djoliba AC, succeeding Georges Kouadio. Upon arrival at the club, he was tasked with helping them win the league and the Malian Cup and achieve qualification for the CAF Champions League in the process. The team ended in third place in the 2020–21 season, but they were knocked out of the Malian Cup by second-tier side Binga FC, which led to his dismissal.

In 2022, he was appointed manager of the Gabon national under-23 football team. He helped the team achieve qualification for the 2023 U-23 Africa Cup of Nations, held in Morocco. However, they were unable to reach the knockout stage of the tournament. Later that same year, he was appointed manager of Gabonese side Lozo Sport. He had resigned from the club by February 2023. On 21 September 2023, Ibela was appointed manager of Benin Premier League side Loto-Popo FC, replacing Mathias Déguénon. While he managed the club, Beninese newspaper Les 4 Vérités described him as "part of the young generation of Gabonese coaches". In 2024, he managed AS Bouenguidi Sports. In 2025, he was the manager of Oyem AC.

On 9 January 2026, he became the manager of FC Tshikas, during the 2025–26 Linafoot season. He won his first match against JS Groupe Bazano, however the team did not avoid relegation.

As of 2026, Ibela is the manager of the Gabon national under-23 football team.
