= Franceville =

Franceville Franceville Masuku
- City
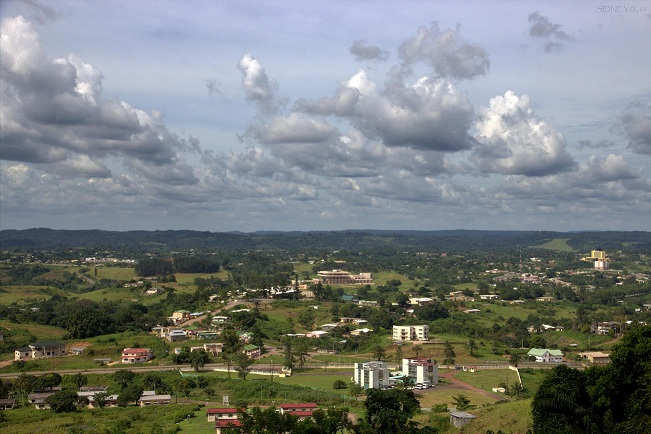

- Coat of arms

- Location in Gabon
- Coordinates: 1°38′S 13°35′E
- Country: Gabon
- Province: Haut-Ogooué
- Department: Mpassa
- Founded: 13 June 1880
- Founded by: Pierre Savorgnan de Brazza
- Elevation: 350 m (1,150 ft)

Population (2013 census)
  - Total: 110,568
- Time zone: UTC+1 (WAT)
- Climate: Aw

Franceville (also historically known as Masuku) is a city in southeastern Gabon and the capital of Haut-Ogooué Province. The 2013 general population and housing census recorded the city's population at 110,568, making it the third-largest commune in the country after Libreville and Port-Gentil. The city lies on the east bank of the Ogooué River, just south of its confluence with the Mpassa, at the eastern terminus of the Trans-Gabon Railway and of the Transgabonaise road corridor running east from Libreville.

Founded in 1880 by the Italo-French explorer Pierre Savorgnan de Brazza on the site of a pre-existing village called Masuku, Franceville grew from a refuge for formerly enslaved Africans into a colonial outpost and, after Gabon's independence in 1960, into an administrative, educational and scientific centre. The city owes much of its twentieth-century development to its proximity to the manganese mines of Moanda and the uranium deposits of Mounana, and to the political patronage of President Omar Bongo, who was born in the nearby village of Lewai (later renamed Bongoville).

Franceville is home to the Université des Sciences et Techniques de Masuku (USTM), Gabon's principal institution for the natural sciences and engineering, and to the Centre Interdisciplinaire de Recherches Médicales de Franceville (CIRMF), a biomedical research institute internationally known for its work on Ebola virus disease and other emerging infections. The surrounding Francevillian basin is internationally significant both as the location of the Oklo natural nuclear fission reactors, discovered in 1972, and as the source of the Francevillian biota, a controversial assemblage of 2.1-billion-year-old macroscopic structures interpreted by some authors as among the earliest evidence of complex life on Earth.

== Etymology ==
The city grew out of a village known as Masuku. When Pierre Savorgnan de Brazza reached the upper Ogooué in June 1880, he chose the site to resettle Africans whom he and his companions had freed from slavery along the coast, and named the new settlement Francheville, a "free town" or "town of the freed", in reference to its function as a place of manumission. The spelling was subsequently modified to Franceville ("town of France"), an orthographic shift that, in effect, transformed the toponym from a reference to freedom into one honouring the colonising power. The indigenous name Masuku has been retained in the name of the city's university, the Université des Sciences et Techniques de Masuku. The regional adjective Francevillian has since been adopted by earth scientists as the standard designation for the Paleoproterozoic sedimentary series around the city and for the assemblage of fossils and natural reactors contained within it.

== History ==
=== Pre-colonial period ===
Archaeological and linguistic evidence indicates that the upper Ogooué valley has been inhabited for at least two millennia. Iron-working farming communities speaking Bantu languages reached the middle and upper Ogooué in the course of the long southward and eastward Bantu expansion. By the nineteenth century the immediate vicinity of modern Franceville lay within the cultural sphere of the Batéké and the closely related Obamba, who are widely described in Gabonese ethnographic literature as the historical populations of the upper Ogooué plateaux. The Batéké of the Franceville area formed part of the wider political and cultural world of the Tio (Téké) Kingdom, whose ruler, the Makoko, exercised ritual and political influence over a large area astride the present Gabon–Congo border.

Subsistence in the upper Ogooué combined fishing along the rivers, hunting in the surrounding gallery forests and savannas, shifting cultivation of yams, bananas and — from the Columbian exchange onwards — cassava, and participation in a network of regional trade in iron, salt, copper, ivory and slaves that linked the interior to the Atlantic coast.

=== Foundation and French colonial period ===
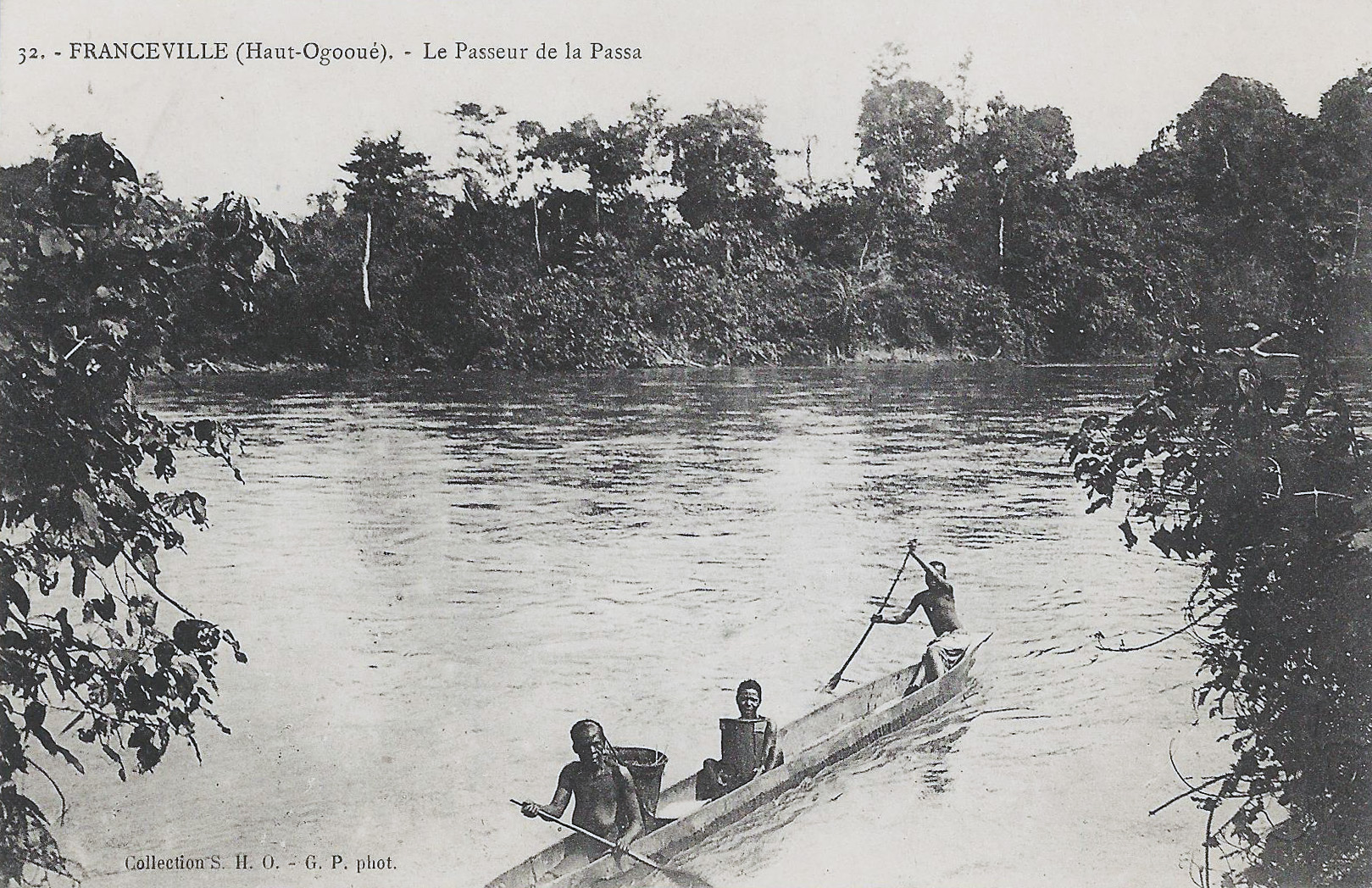
The ferryman of the Mpassa River

Franceville was founded on 13 June 1880 during the second expedition of the Italian-born French naval officer Pierre Savorgnan de Brazza into the upper Ogooué basin. Brazza's party, hampered in its eastward progress by the rapids of Poubara, halted at the village of Masuku, where Brazza established a post and settled there a number of Africans whom he and his collaborators had freed from coastal slave traders. From this base Brazza pressed on to the Congo, where in September 1880 he signed with the Makoko the treaty that would ultimately provide the legal basis for French sovereignty over what became the French Congo and Gabon.

The Berlin Conference of 1884–1885 internationally recognised French claims in the region, and in 1886 an enlarged Gabon was attached to the French Congo under Brazza's governorship. Franceville remained administratively part of the Middle Congo colony until 1946, when it was transferred to Gabon. In 1910 Gabon, together with Middle Congo, Chad and Ubangi-Shari, was incorporated into the federation of French Equatorial Africa.

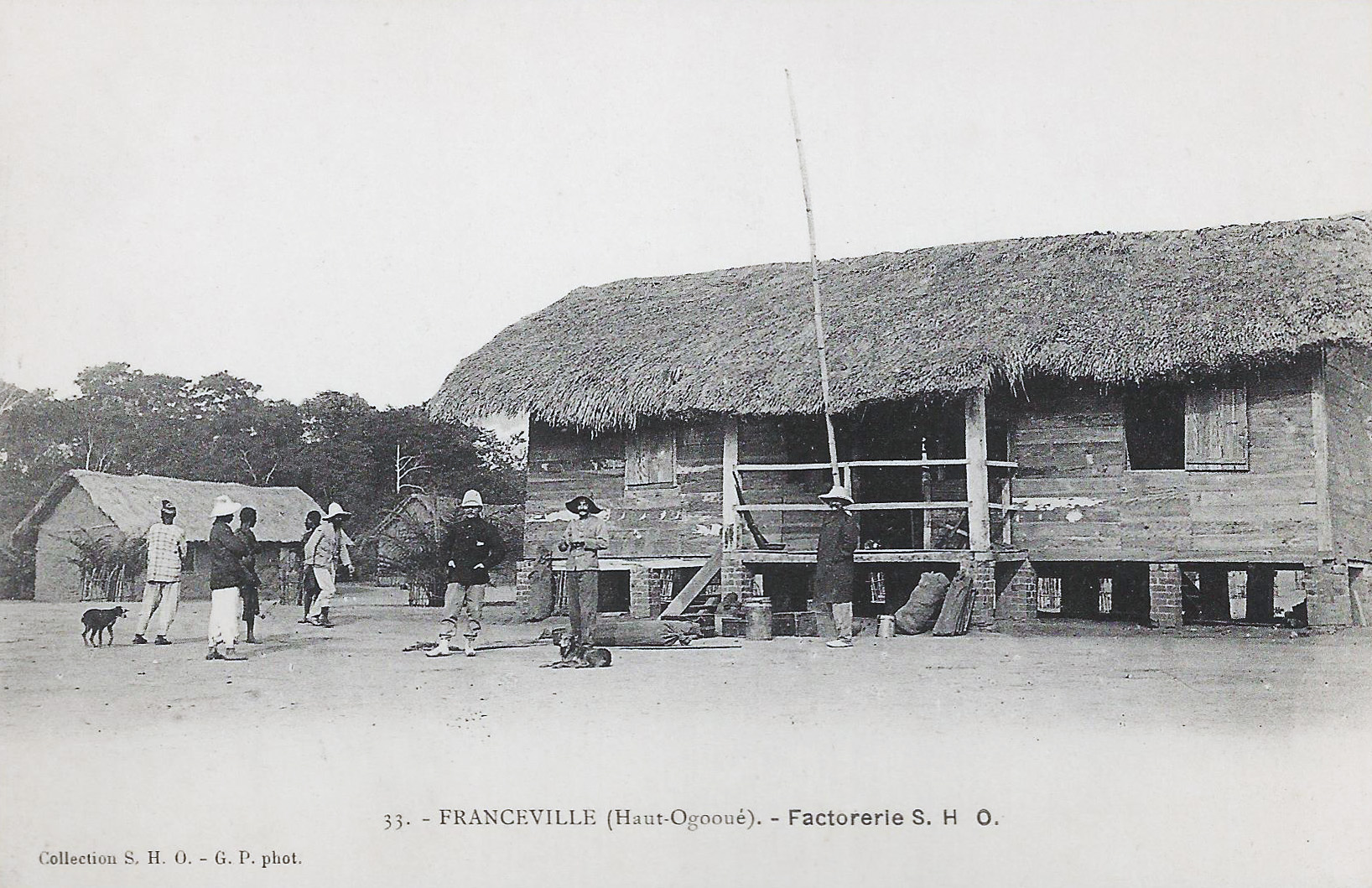
A trading post ("factorerie") operated by the Société du Haut-Ogooué (S.H.O.) around 1900

For most of the colonial period Franceville remained a small administrative post. It was the seat of a Catholic mission, and the brick-built Saint-Hilaire church, erected in 1899, is among the oldest surviving structures in the upper Ogooué. Colonial economic activity in the surrounding district consisted chiefly of concessionary rubber extraction, porterage, limited cash-crop agriculture (notably coffee) and, from the 1930s, artisanal gold mining southwest of the town.

=== Mining boom and post-independence expansion ===
Systematic geological prospecting carried out by the French after the Second World War transformed the economic and demographic balance of the upper Ogooué. Large deposits of high-grade manganese ore were identified at Moanda, about 65 km northwest of Franceville, and were brought into production from 1962 by the Compagnie Minière de l'Ogooué (COMILOG). Uranium prospecting in the Franceville basin began in 1955, leading to the discovery of the Mounana deposit in 1956; the Compagnie des Mines d'Uranium de Franceville (COMUF) was incorporated in 1958, and according to the IAEA's World Distribution of Uranium Deposits database, 25,635 tonnes of uranium were produced from the Mounana district between 1962 and 1999 by open-pit and underground mining. Over the four decades of operation, COMUF extracted ore from the Mounana open pit (1960–1975), the Oklo deposits (1970–1985 open pit; 1977–1997 underground), Boyindzi (1980–1991) and Mikouloungou (1997–1999).

Gabon became fully independent from France on 17 August 1960. The country's second president, Omar Bongo, born Albert-Bernard Bongo on 30 December 1935 in the nearby village of Lewai (now Bongoville), came to power in 1967 and ruled until his death in 2009. Bongo's long tenure was accompanied by heavy public investment in his home province, transforming what had been, before 1970, a small administrative post "closer culturally and economically to the Congo than to Gabon" into one of the country's principal urban centres equipped with all-weather roads, a modern hospital, a university, a biomedical research institute and an international airport. Construction of the Trans-Gabon Railway to Franceville, begun in 1974, was completed in December 1986, with passenger services to the city commencing in 1987.

After Bongo's death in Barcelona on 8 June 2009 his body was repatriated to Gabon, lay in state at the presidential palace in Libreville, and on 18 June 2009 was buried in a private family ceremony at Franceville.

== Geography ==
Franceville lies on the eastern bank of the Ogooué immediately south of the river's confluence with the Mpassa, at an elevation of roughly 350 m (1,150 ft) above sea level. The urban area is built on a series of low plateaux that form a transitional zone between the dense equatorial rainforest of the central Gabon basin to the north and west and the grassy Batéké Plateau to the east and south.

About 15 km south of the city the Ogooué enters a constricted gorge that produces the Poubara Falls; the falls and the adjoining rapids are spanned by traditional liana (vine) suspension bridges that are among the longest of their type in Gabon. The Ogooué itself rises on the Batéké Plateau on the Congolese side of the frontier to the east.

== Climate ==
Franceville has a tropical savanna climate (Aw in the Köppen climate classification), with warm temperatures throughout the year, a long rainy season from roughly September to May, and a relatively dry and cooler season in June, July and August. Frequent thunderstorms occur during the rainy months.

Climate data for Franceville
Month	Jan	Feb	Mar	Apr	May	Jun	Jul	Aug	Sep	Oct	Nov	Dec	Year
Mean daily maximum °C (°F)	29 (85)	30 (86)	31 (87)	31 (87)	29 (85)	28 (83)	27 (81)	28 (83)	29 (85)	29 (85)	29 (85)	29 (85)	29 (85)
Mean daily minimum °C (°F)	20 (68)	20 (68)	20 (68)	20 (68)	20 (68)	19 (66)	18 (64)	18 (65)	19 (67)	19 (67)	19 (67)	20 (68)	19 (67)
Average precipitation mm (inches)	160 (6.3)	190 (7.5)	220 (8.5)	210 (8.3)	210 (8.1)	33 (1.3)	7.6 (0.3)	20 (0.8)	110 (4.2)	260 (10.4)	250 (10)	190 (7.6)	1,860 (73.3)
Source: Weatherbase

== Demographics ==
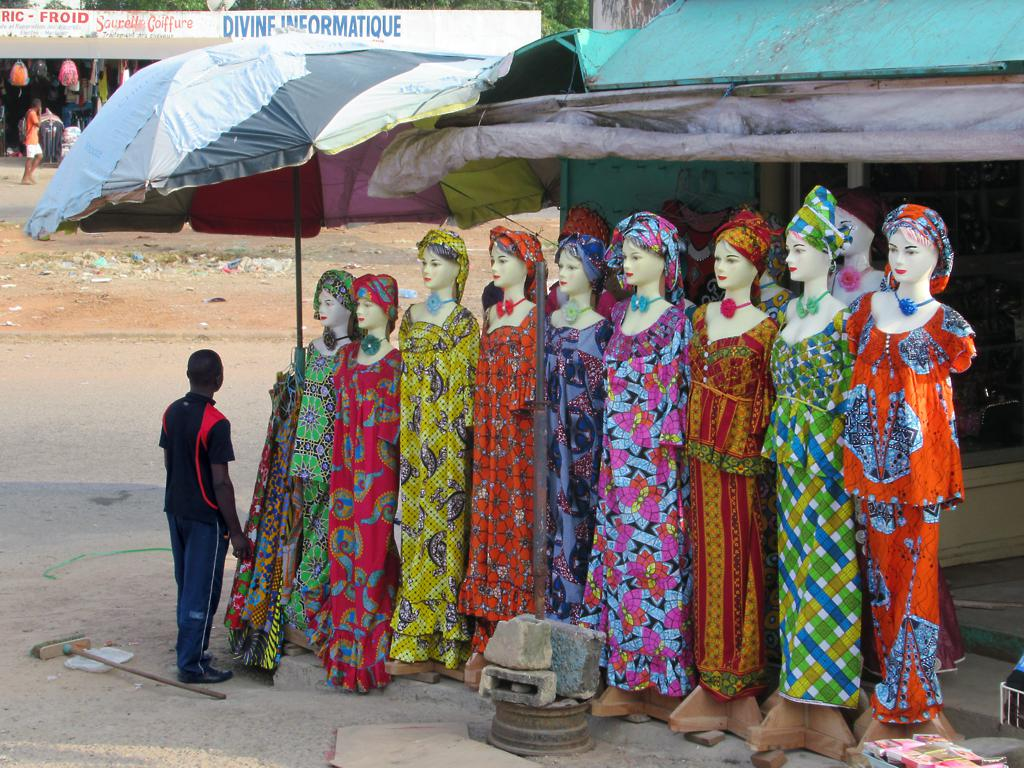
Local fashion in Franceville

At the 2013 census Franceville recorded 110,568 inhabitants, making the commune the third-largest urban centre in Gabon after Libreville and Port-Gentil; in provincial terms it heads Haut-Ogooué, one of the nine provinces of the country.

Haut-Ogooué is described in the regional literature as the historical home of the Batéké (Téké), the Obamba and smaller ethno-linguistic groupings such as the Ndumu, the Bakanighi, the Ndzébi (Nzébi) and the Mbete, all of them speakers of Bantu languages belonging to the Téké and related groups of the Niger-Congo family. Internal migration since the 1960s, linked in particular to mining and to public-sector employment, has added to this base a population drawn from elsewhere in Gabon as well as smaller communities of West African and Levantine traders. French is the sole official language and the language of administration, schooling and inter-ethnic communication.

The majority of the population of Haut-Ogooué is Christian, with Roman Catholic and Protestant (chiefly Evangelical) adherents predominating, alongside a Muslim minority and continuing practice of indigenous religious traditions.

== Economy ==
Franceville is the principal commercial and service centre of Haut-Ogooué Province. It functions primarily as a trading town for a mining hinterland and as the main staging point for the transport of manganese, timber and passengers along the Trans-Gabon Railway. The most important industrial activity of the surrounding region is the Moanda manganese complex operated by COMILOG, a subsidiary of the French mining and metallurgical group Eramet; Gabon is among the world's largest producers and exporters of manganese ore.

Uranium was extracted from the Mounana district — including the deposits of Oklo, Okélobondo and Bangombé - between 1962 and 1999, when COMUF ceased production after the exhaustion of the most readily recoverable reserves; over those four decades Mounana supplied a substantial portion of the uranium used in the French civil and military nuclear programmes. Reclamation works at the former open-pit and underground workings, overseen in successive phases by Cogema/Areva/Orano, have been under way since closure, though the adequacy of post-mining rehabilitation remains contested in the technical and environmental literature.

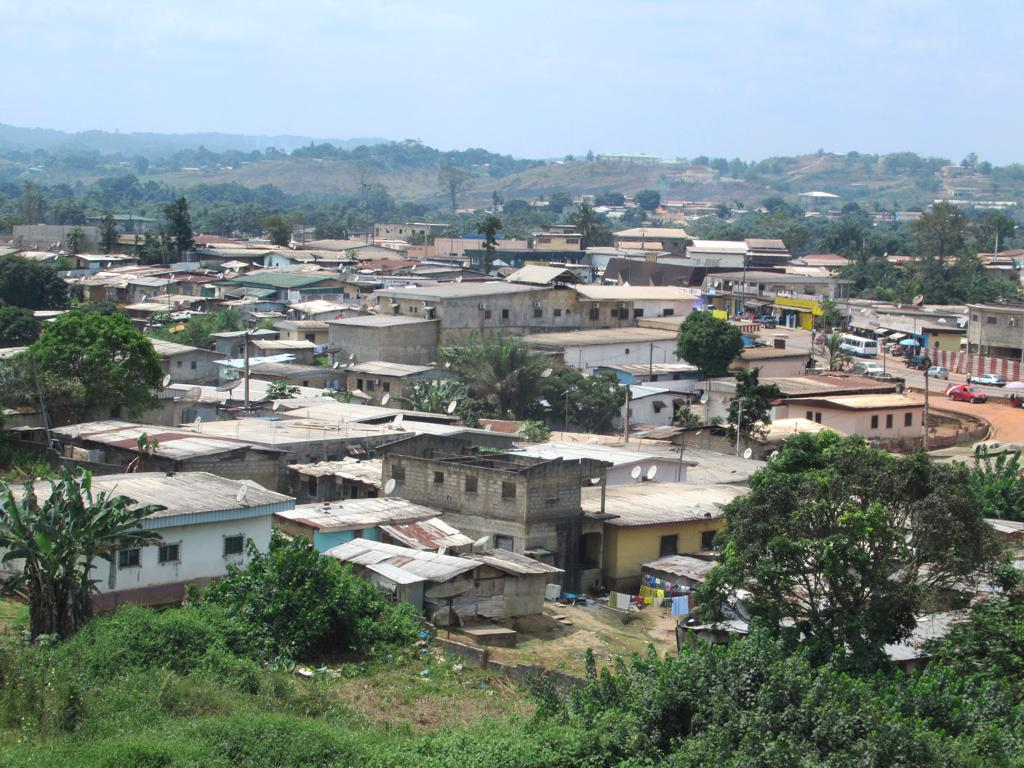
Poto-Poto Market Area

Smaller-scale economic activities in and around Franceville include artisanal and small-scale gold mining, livestock rearing and agriculture (cassava, plantain, maize, cocoyam, peanuts and coffee), fishing along the Ogooué and the Mpassa, and an informal service and trading sector focused on the Grand Marché in the city centre. The Batéké plateaux support commercial ranching, and the Parc de la Lékédi, established by COMILOG on a former mining concession south of the city, maintains introduced and native fauna for conservation and ecotourism purposes.

Electricity for Franceville and for the Moanda mining district is supplied chiefly from the Grand Poubara Dam, a roller-compacted-concrete gravity dam built on the Ogooué about 15 km south of the city. The dam diverts the river around Poubara Falls to power four 40 MW Francis turbines for a total installed capacity of 160 MW. Financed principally by loans from the Export–Import Bank of China and constructed under an engineering-procurement-construction contract by Sinohydro, the plant was commissioned in August 2013.

== Administration ==
Franceville is the capital of Haut-Ogooué Province, the southeasternmost of Gabon's nine provinces, and the seat of the Mpassa Department, one of the province's constituent departments. As the provincial capital it hosts the office of the governor of Haut-Ogooué and the provincial seats of the national ministries. The city is organised as a commune governed by a mayor and a municipal council under the national decentralisation framework.

== Education ==
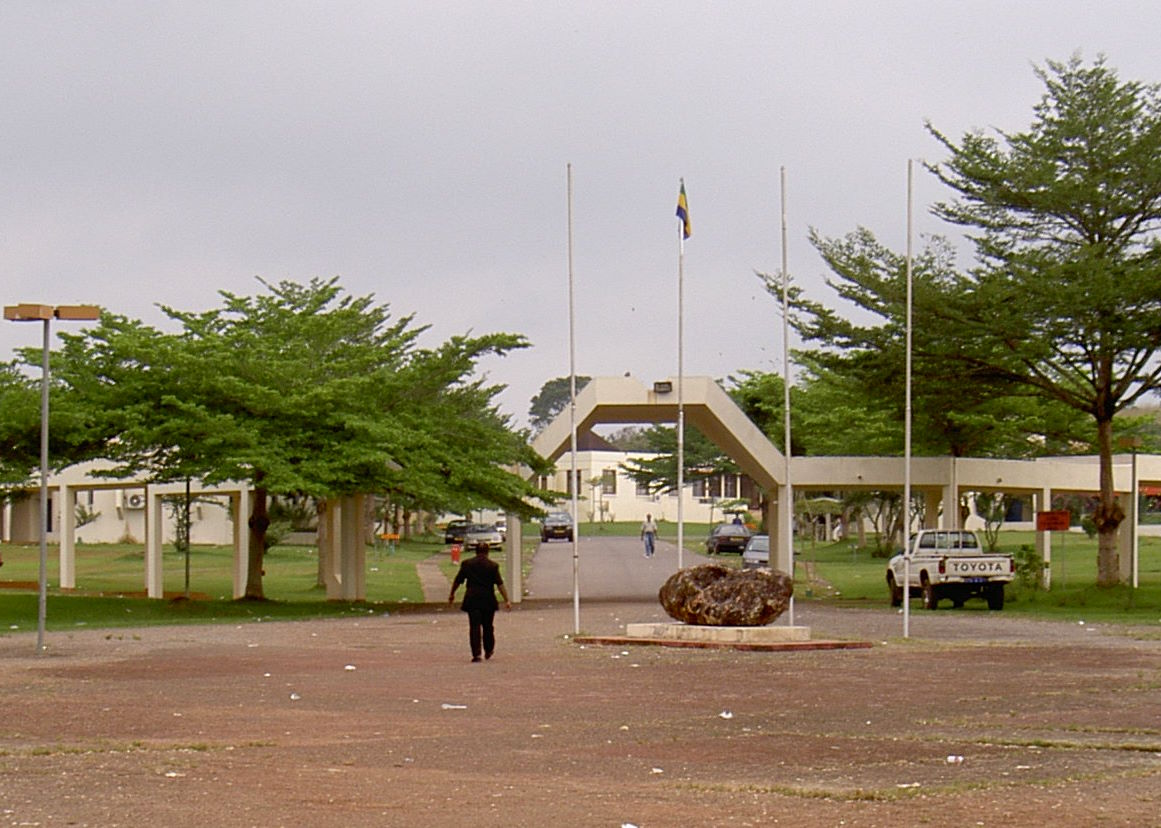
USTM entrance

Franceville is the seat of the Université des sciences et techniques de Masuku (USTM), a public university established by Gabonese Law No. 7/85 of 29 January 1986. The institution was created by the transfer from Libreville to Franceville of the Faculty of Sciences of the Université Omar Bongo and of the École Nationale Supérieure d'Ingénieurs de Libreville (ENSIL), which became the École Polytechnique de Masuku (EPM). Construction of the Masuku campus was financed jointly by the Gabonese State, the Saudi Fund for Development, the Islamic Development Bank and the French government.

USTM is the principal institution of higher education in Gabon devoted to the natural sciences, engineering and applied biology. It comprises the Faculty of Sciences (biology, chemistry, geology, mathematics and physics), the École Polytechnique de Masuku (civil engineering, electromechanical engineering, industrial computing, telecommunications and industrial maintenance) and the Institut National Supérieur d'Agronomie et de Biotechnologies (INSAB), among other units. Since 2007 its curricula have been aligned with the Licence–Master–Doctorat (LMD) system used across Francophone Africa.

Primary and secondary education in Franceville is provided by a network of public and denominational (chiefly Catholic) schools, together with technical lycées oriented towards the mining and industrial sectors.

== Research and medicine ==
The Centre Interdisciplinaire de Recherches Médicales de Franceville (CIRMF) (historically the Centre International de Recherches Médicales de Franceville) is a biomedical research institute located on the western edge of the city. It was created in 1974 by joint decision of the presidency of the Republic of Gabon and the French petroleum company Elf Aquitaine (now part of TotalEnergies), and was officially inaugurated on 5 December 1979 by President Omar Bongo Ondimba.

Initially focused on human reproductive biology and in particular on the causes of infertility in Gabonese women, the centre was later reorganised around the study of infectious diseases, parasitology and primatology. It houses laboratories for virology, bacteriology, parasitology, haematology, immunology and biochemistry, a Primatology Centre maintaining a colony of great apes used in comparative biomedical research, and a biosafety-level-4 laboratory, one of only a small number on the African continent, built to support work on viral haemorrhagic fevers.

The CIRMF has played a central role in the investigation of the multiple outbreaks of Ebola virus disease that affected northern and central Gabon between 1994 and 2002. Laboratory diagnosis of the 1994–1995 outbreak in Makokou, the 1996 Mayibout 2 and Booué outbreaks and the 2001–2002 Mékambo/Ogooué-Ivindo outbreak was performed at the centre, and CIRMF researchers contributed substantially to the identification of African fruit bats as a probable natural reservoir of filoviruses. The centre also functions as a national reference laboratory of Gabon for a range of infectious diseases.

== Transport ==
=== Rail ===
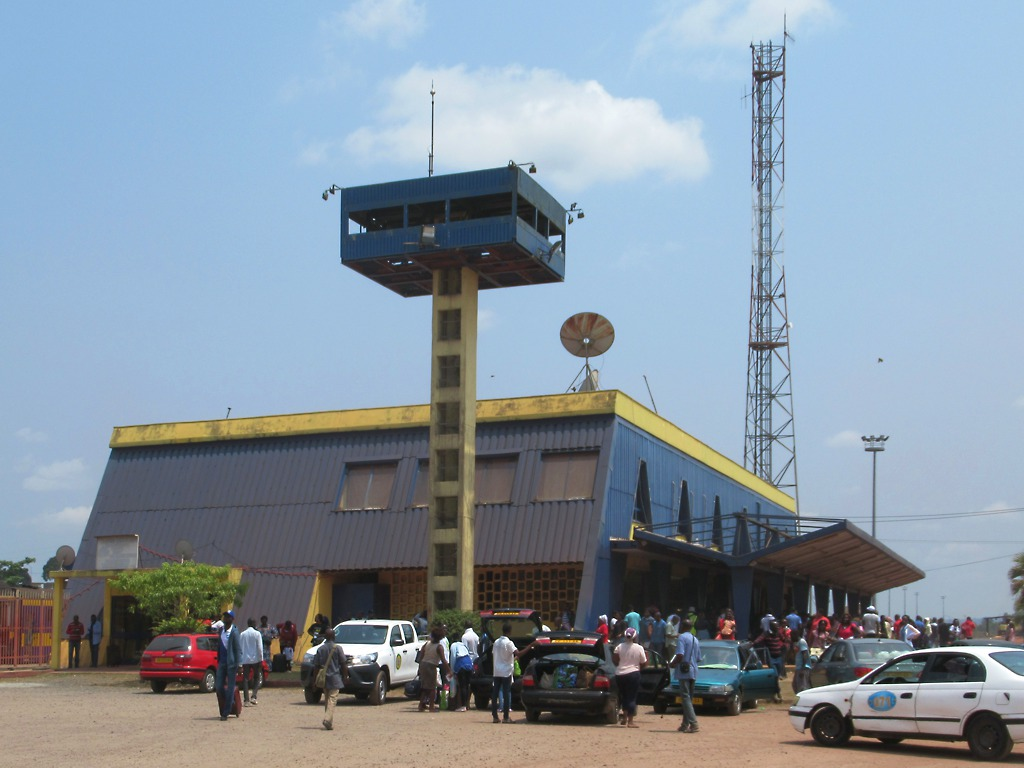
Franceville Railway Station

Franceville is the eastern terminus of the Trans-Gabon Railway (Transgabonais), the country's only railway line. The single-track line runs eastwards from the port of Owendo near Libreville, through Ndjolé, Lopé, Booué, Lastoursville and Moanda, to Franceville; its length is given as 648 km by the current operator and in recent official and investor documentation, though older engineering descriptions typically cite 669 km. Construction of the railway began in 1974 and proceeded in stages: the first section from Owendo to Ndjolé opened in 1978, and the final section into Franceville was completed in December 1986, with passenger services commencing in 1987.

Since 2005 the line has been operated under a long-term concession by the Société d'Exploitation du Transgabonais (SETRAG), a subsidiary of COMILOG (Eramet). Both freight, dominated by manganese ore from Moanda, and passenger traffic use the line, which since 2015 has been the subject of an extensive rehabilitation programme supported by the International Finance Corporation, the French Development Agency and the European Union.

=== Air ===
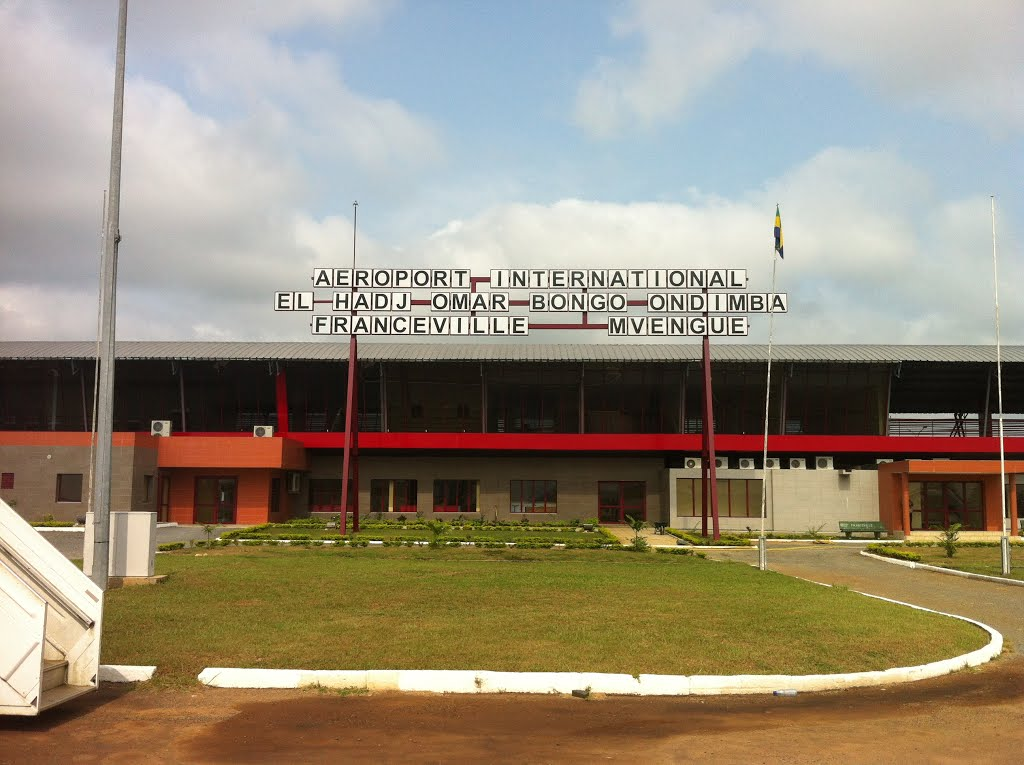
Franceville Airport

The city is served by M'Vengue El Hadj Omar Bongo Ondimba International Airport located about 16 km west of the city near the village of M'Vengué. It has a single paved runway and also hosts elements of the Gabonese Air Force. As of the mid-2020s, scheduled passenger service at the airport consists of the domestic route to Libreville operated by Afrijet Business Service.

=== Roads ===
Franceville is the eastern terminus of the Transgabonaise road corridor, an 828-km trunk route linking the city to Libreville and composed of segments of four national routes — RN1, RN2, RN3 and RN4, running through Ntoum, Kango, Bifoun, Ndjolé, Alembé, Lalara, Booué, Lastoursville, Mounana and Moanda. The corridor is currently the subject of a multi-phase rehabilitation programme under a 30-year public–private partnership awarded in October 2019 to Société Autoroutière du Gabon (SAG), with works divided into three stages: Libreville (KP 12)–Alembé (KP 248), Alembé–Mikouyi (KP 626) and Mikouyi–Franceville (KP 814). Franceville is also linked by secondary roads to Bongoville and to the border with the Republic of the Congo in the Léconi area. Urban transport within the city is provided chiefly by shared taxis.

== Landmarks and culture ==
Notable features of the city include the Saint-Hilaire church, built in 1899 and among the oldest Catholic churches in the upper Ogooué; a monumental statue of President Omar Bongo Ondimba; and the Grand Marché, the principal urban market.

Outside the city limits, the Poubara Falls and the traditional liana suspension bridges that cross the Ogooué gorge below them have long been a regional attraction; the Parc de la Lékédi, operated in a former COMILOG concession to the south of the city, is a wildlife reserve where introduced and native species are maintained for conservation and tourism.

=== Sport ===
The Stade de Franceville, a football stadium of approximately 22,000 seats built on the outskirts of the city and opened in January 2012, was one of four venues used when Gabon and Equatorial Guinea co-hosted the 2012 Africa Cup of Nations, and was again used during the 2017 Africa Cup of Nations, which Gabon hosted alone.

== Scientific significance ==
=== Oklo natural nuclear fission reactors ===
The uranium ore bodies of the Francevillian basin northwest of the city, in particular the Oklo, Okélobondo and Bangombé deposits, host the only known examples on Earth of natural nuclear fission reactors. The existence of natural criticality at Oklo was deduced in 1972 by researchers of the French Commissariat à l'énergie atomique after routine isotopic analysis of Gabonese uranium revealed an anomalously low ratio of fissile uranium-235 in ore from the Mounana mine; subsequent field and laboratory investigations established that a number of reactor zones had operated intermittently at the site around two billion years ago, sustained by naturally occurring water acting as a neutron moderator in uranium deposits then enriched to about 3% U-235. The Oklo deposits have since served as a natural analogue for studies of long-term radioactive waste storage.

The uranyl-vanadate mineral francevillite, first described in 1957 from the Mounana mine and named for the city, takes its name from Franceville; a number of other rare uranium and vanadium minerals, among them curienite, chervetite and mounanaite, were also first identified in the Franceville–Mounana district.

=== Francevillian biota ===
Since 2008 an international team led by the Moroccan-born geologist Abderrazak El Albani of the University of Poitiers has documented a collection of 2.1-billion-year-old macroscopic structures preserved in the black shales of the Francevillian B Formation exposed in quarries and outcrops in Haut-Ogooué. These structures, described in a 2010 paper in Nature and in subsequent publications in PLoS ONE and the Proceedings of the National Academy of Sciences, have been interpreted by their discoverers as possible evidence of colonial and, in some cases, motile multicellular organisms, hundreds of millions of years older than the earliest widely accepted complex organisms. The informal names Francevillian biota and Gabonionta are used in the scientific literature to describe the assemblage, whose biological affinities remain disputed; some authors interpret the structures as non-biogenic or as microbial mat features rather than as metazoans.

== Notable people ==
- Pierre Savorgnan de Brazza (1852–1905), Italian-born French explorer and colonial administrator; founder of the settlement in 1880.
- Omar Bongo (1935–2009), second President of Gabon (1967–2009); born in Lewai (now Bongoville), in the immediate hinterland of Franceville, and buried in the city in 2009.
- Ali Bongo Ondimba (born 1959), son of Omar Bongo and third President of Gabon from 2009 until he was removed from office by a military coup on 30 August 2023; he represented the Haut-Ogooué constituency of Bongoville in the National Assembly earlier in his career.

== International relations ==
=== Twin towns – sister cities ===
Franceville is twinned with:

- Vire, France (since 1983)

== See also ==
- Oklo
- Natural nuclear fission reactor
- Franceville, New Hebrides
- List of companies and cities in Africa that manufacture cement
- Railway stations in Gabon

== Bibliography ==
- Maria Petringa, Brazza, A Life for Africa. Bloomington, IN: AuthorHouse, 2006. ISBN 978-1-4259-1198-0
- Bernault, Florence (1996). Démocraties ambiguës en Afrique centrale: Congo-Brazzaville, Gabon, 1940–1965. Paris: Karthala. ISBN 978-2-86537-636-0.
- Gray, Christopher J. (2002). Colonial Rule and Crisis in Equatorial Africa: Southern Gabon, c. 1850–1940. Rochester, NY: University of Rochester Press. ISBN 978-1-58046-048-4.
- Hecht, Gabrielle (2012). Being Nuclear: Africans and the Global Uranium Trade. Cambridge, MA: MIT Press. ISBN 978-0-262-01726-8.
- Vansina, Jan (1990). Paths in the Rainforests: Toward a History of Political Tradition in Equatorial Africa. Madison: University of Wisconsin Press. ISBN 978-0-299-12573-8.
