= SNPG =

SNPG can refer to:

- Scottish National Portrait Gallery
- Société Nationale Petrolière Gabonaise
