= Wongosport =

- Full name: Wongosport
- Ground: Stade Mbéba; Lastoursville, Gabon
- Capacity: 4,000
- Chairman: Etienne Guy Mouvagha Tchioba
- Manager: Faustin Banguiya
- League: Gabon Championnat National D1
Home colours	Away colours

Wongosport is a Gabonese football club based in Lastoursville.

The club's colours are yellow and red.

== Current Squad 2006/07 ==
Note: Flags indicate national team as defined under FIFA eligibility rules; some limited exceptions apply. Players may hold more than one non-FIFA nationality.

No.	Pos.	Nation	Player
—	GK	(Gabon) GAB	Hugues Olenda
—	DF	(Gabon) GAB	Bernadin Akoli
—	DF	(Gabon) GAB	Théodore Mbombe
—	DF	(Republic of the Congo) CGO	Gastien Mougnengue
—	DF	(Gabon) GAB	Hugues Oyoumi
—	DF	(Gabon) GAB	Mohamed Ossouka
—	DF	(Gabon) GAB	Ali Boucard Bingouma
—	DF	(Gabon) GAB	Anacle Boudzingui
—	MF	(Gabon) GAB	Loic Lepemangoye
—	MF	(Ghana) GHA	Prince Matthaus
—	MF	(Gabon) GAB	Etienne Medjo

No.	Pos.	Nation	Player
—	MF	(Gabon) GAB	Bertrand Loumba
—	MF	(Gabon) GAB	Constant Lepinda
—	MF	(Gabon) GAB	Thibault Mabengou
—	MF	(Gabon) GAB	Jean-Romain Guitino
—	FW	(Gabon) GAB	Thierry Massueme
—	FW	(Gabon) GAB	Brice Moukoumi
—	FW	(Gabon) GAB	Verlaine Malanda
—	FW	(Gabon) GAB	Ronald Opalas
—	FW	(Gabon) GAB	Arnold Yembi
—	FW	(Gabon) GAB	Dany Mibimou
—	FW	(Gabon) GAB	Donatien Ndong
—	FW	(Gabon) GAB	Guy Ngalebou
