= Geology of Gabon =

Gabon is situated at the northwestern margin of the Congo Craton—a region of stable, ancient crust—and preserves very ancient rock units across 75% of the country, with overlying sedimentary units from the Cretaceous and other more recent periods.

== Stratigraphy and tectonics ==
The oldest rocks in Gabon are granitoid Archean basement rocks, 2.8 to 2.6 Ga old, that span into Cameroon, Equatorial Guinea and the Republic of Congo. The basements rocks are divided between the Chaillu Massif and North Gabon Massif. Like many other Archean cratons, the granitoid rocks are associated with potassic rocks, granite, monzonite, syenite and diorite-tonalite-granodiorite sequences. A large charnockitic body—a series of metamorphic rocks with varying chemical composition—exists in southern Gabon. Unlike other parts of Africa, Gabon lacks greenstone belt development.

=== Proterozoic (2500-541 Ma) ===
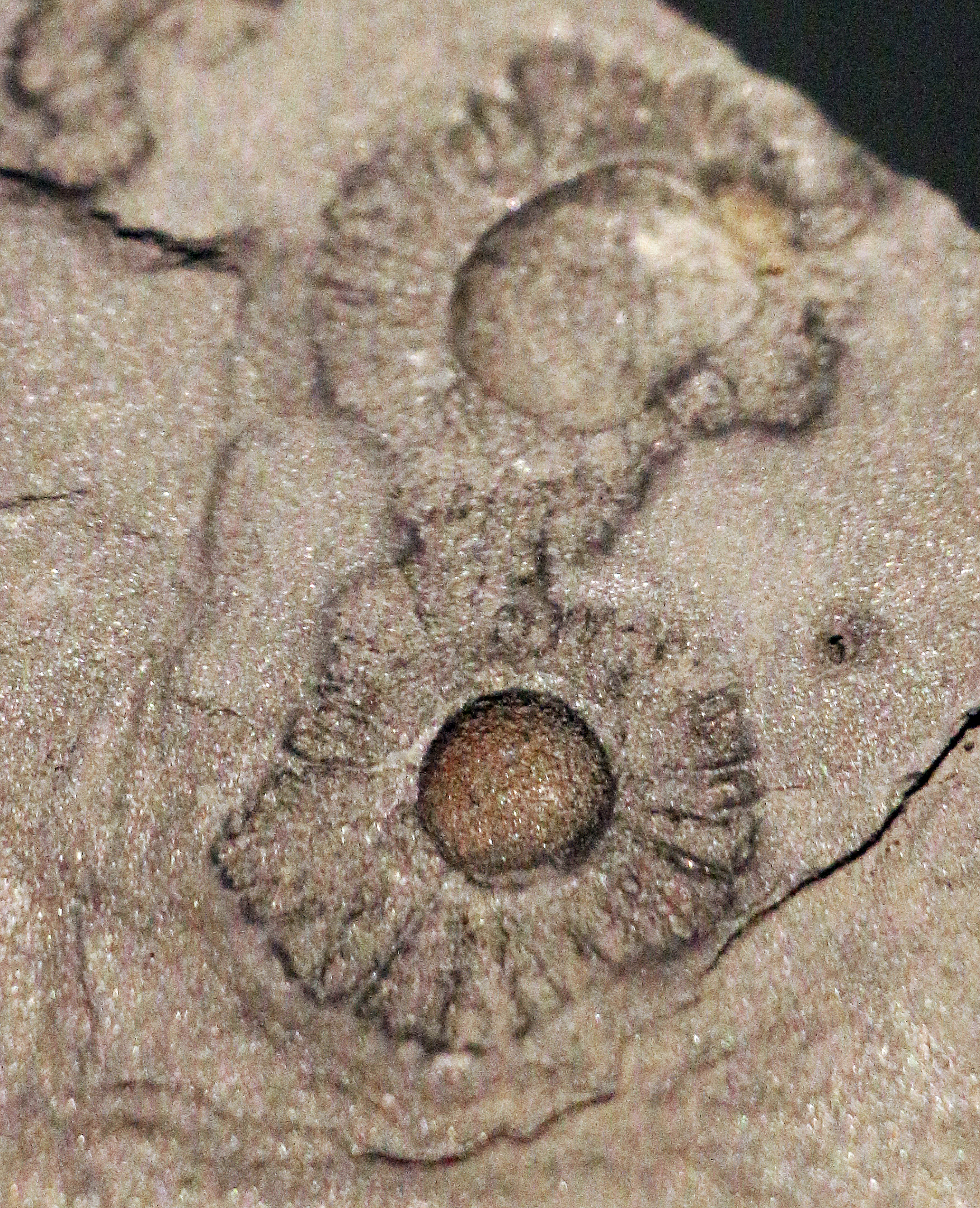
The Francevillian biota is known as one of the oldest form of possible Eukaryote communities, and is dated at around 2.1 ga.

The Franceville Supergroup is made up of approximately 2 Ga Paleoproterozoic rocks, located in the east-central part of the country. The Ogooue orogenic belt in west-central Gabon also dates to the Paleoproterozoic, made up of heavily deformed metasedimentary and metavolcanic rocks from a fold and thrust belt. In the southwest, the Mayombe-Nyanga terrane contains high-grade Paleoproterozoic basement rocks, the Lambarene migmatite belt, as well as Doussa Supergroup metasedimentary rocks. Granites appear after the tectonic activity ended and are 1.9 Ga. The Mayombe Supergroup, within the Mayombe-Nyanga terrane, along with Franceville dolerite dykes from 970 Ma are the only remnants of the Mesoproterozoic rocks. The Nyanga Basin and de-la-Noya in the western part of Gabon expose the Neoproterozoic West Congolian Supergroup, with deformed volcanic and sedimentary sequences, similar to others in southern Africa. A small carbonatite formation was deposited 669 Ma in the Lambarene region.

=== Cretaceous-Quaternary (145 million years ago to the present) ===
A horst from the Early Cretaceous splits the Lambarene-Chincoua basement rocks and divides the overlying western sedimentary basin in two. The eastern, interior basin is made of a mix of lacustrine and continental sedimentary rocks, while marine sediments are common in the western basin, from the Cretaceous to as recently as the Quaternary in the past 2.5 Ma.

== Oklo natural nuclear fission reactor ==
Gabon has the world's only site known to have self-sustaining natural nuclear fission, at the Oklo reactor zones near the town of Franceville in the Haut-Ogooué province. The site was discovered in 1972, during French mining for uranium to supply nuclear reactors. Geologists noticed an unusually low concentration of uranium-235, leading to the current theory that the site was a natural nuclear reactor two billion years ago. Although the original Oklo Mine's resources are now depleted, 17 other sites have been found in the same region that once sustained nuclear fission.

Half of the reactor zones lack carbonaceous material and in these locations, cesium, rubidium, strontium and boron escaped and were lost. However, in others uraninite is encased in solidified two billion year old bitumen. Some geologists have suggested that this natural bitumen encasement could be a way of storing human produced nuclear waste in permanent geologic disposal sites.

== Natural resource geology ==
The petroleum sector is integral to the Gabonese economy. Oil and gas are produced from the western sedimentary basin, which extends into the Atlantic Ocean as far west as Sao Tome. Hydrocarbons formed in rift basins left over from the opening of the Atlantic Ocean. Many of the oil and gas deposits are contained within salt diapirs, better known as salt dome features. The Rabi-Kounga oil field, the country's largest, was discovered onshore in 1985, 100 kilometers north of Gamba. It began producing in 1989. Other oil and gas fields are likely to be discovered as drilling and seismic research continues. Manganese ore is mined in lower Proterozoic deposits near Mounana in southeast Gabon. Uranium deposits were mined out of sandstones in the Franceville Basin until 1999. Diamonds are commonplace in Gabon, mainly extracted in the Makongonio area in the south as well as the Mitzic region in the north. Other resources include iron ore in the Makokou-Mekambo area, barite near Dourekiki and phosphate and niobium at Mabounie. Geologists have identified other deposits such as tantalite, zinc, lead, dolomitic limestone, talc, potash and a variety of other materials.
