= Rabi Kounga oil field =

Oil field located in Ogooué-Maritime, Gabon

Rabi Kounga
- Country: Gabon
- Region: Ogooué-Maritime Province
- Offshore/onshore: onshore
- Operator: Royal Dutch Shell

Field history
- Discovery: 1985
- Start of production: 1989

Production
- Estimated oil in place: 59 million tonnes (~ 70×10^{6} m^{3} or 440 million bbl)

The Rabi Kounga oil field is an oil field located in Ogooué-Maritime Province. It was discovered in 1985 and developed by Royal Dutch Shell. It began production in 1989 and produces oil. The total proven reserves of the Rabi Kounga oil field are around 440 million barrels (59 million tonnes), and production is centered on 150,000 barrels per day (24,000 m^{3}/d).

== Facilities ==
For access to the location, a single-runway airfield has been constructed. Flights go to (at least) Gamba and Port Gentil.

Around the airfield is a substantial accommodation and administration camp. By analogy with other Shell remote locations, this will contain some significant degree of trauma-treatment facility, at least sufficient to stabilise a patient while air evacuation is arranged.

There are several oil separating facilities in the area (the first stage of refining, degassing the oil prior to long-distance pipe transport), and an oil-export pipeline. (Destination is also probably Gamba, but this is not clear from publicly available sources. There are security concerns about publicising the routes of pipelines widely.)

== See also ==
- Energy in Gabon
- Geology of Gabon
