= Loto-Popo FC =

Beninese football club

- Full name: Loto-Popo Football Club
- Nickname: Loto Boys
- Short name: Loto-Popo
- Founded: 2021; 5 years ago
- Ground: Stade Omnisports de Grand-Popo
- Manager: Moukaïla Yessoufu
- League: Celtiis Ligue 1
- 2025–26: Celtiis Ligue 1, 4th of 18
- Website: www.lotopopo.bj

The Loto-Popo Football Club is a Beninese football club founded in 2021 and based in Grand-Popo in the Mono Department. They currently play in the Celtiis Ligue 1, the highest division of football in Benin.

The club succeeded the former École Supérieure d'Administration et d'Économie Football Club and is affiliated with the loterie nationale du Bénin.

== History ==
The club won their inaugural season, the 2020–21 Ligue Pro, which began in January 2021. They ended their second season, the 2021–22 Ligue Pro in third place. The team finished as runners-up in their third season, the 2022–23 Ligue Pro.

== Stadium ==
The team plays at the Stade Omnisports de Grand-Popo.

== Personnel ==
Role	Name
President	(Benin) Gaston Zossou
Director General	(Benin) Wilfrido Ayibatin
Secretary General	(Benin) Hospice Omiyalé

=== Managers ===
Name	Nat	From	To
Rachad Chitou	(Benin)	2021	2021
Mathias Déguénon	(Benin)	2021	2021
Abdeslam Ouaddou	(Morocco)	2021	2023
Mathias Déguénon	(Benin)	2023	2023
Saturnin Ibela	(Gabon)	2023	2024
Cheikh Guèye	(Senegal)	2024	2026
Moukaïla Yessoufu	(Benin)	2026	

== African record ==
As of September 2026.

Competition	Appearance	Matches played	Won	Drawn	Lost	GF	GA
CAF Champions League	1	2	0	1	1	1	3
CAF Confederation Cup	1	2	0	0	2	0	5

Season	Competition	Round		Club	Home	Away
2021–22	CAF Champions League	1R	(Mauritania)	FC Nouadhibou	1–1	0–2
2023–24	CAF Confederation Cup	1R	(Morocco)	FUS Rabat	0–2	0–3

== Honor ==
Benin Premier League: 2021
