= Gaston Zossou =

Beninese teacher and politician

Minister of Communication and Promotion of New Technologies
- In office 1999–2005
- President: Mathieu Kérékou

Personal details
- Born: 1 October 1954 (age 71) Porto-Novo, Benin
- Occupation: Politician, teacher, author, entrepreneur

Gaston Zossou (born 1 October 1954 in Porto-Novo, Benin) is a former minister in the government of President Mathieu Kérékou, a teacher, author, entrepreneur, and Beninese politician.

== Biography ==
=== Early life and education ===
Gaston Zossou was born on 1 October 1954 in Porto-Novo.

=== Career ===
Gaston Zossou began his professional life as an English teacher. He ventured into agricultural entrepreneurship by producing pineapples. He became well known to the Beninese people when he joined the government of General Mathieu Kérékou as the Minister of Communication and Promotion of New Technologies and then served as the Minister of Culture, Communication, and Government Spokesperson between 1999 and 2005. He was appointed Director General of the National Lottery of Benin on 31 May 2016, and took office on Thursday 3 June 2016. In 2000, Gaston Zossou published In the Name of Africa with L’Harmattan, a political essay in which he diagnoses the problems plaguing the African continent and suggests ways to overcome them.

He is also the president of the football club Loto Popo FC.

== Publications ==
Gaston Zossou is the author of several literary works, including essays and novels:

Essays

- In the Name of Africa, L’Harmattan, 2000
- The Duty to Speak, Tamarin, 2014

Novels at Riveneuve Editions

- The War of Things in the Shadows
- Those People Are Wild Beasts, 2008
- Pure Metal Crab, 2009
- A Bone in the Throat of the Gods, 2012
- The Children of Sand, 2015
- The Woman with the Portfolio, 2017
