= Energy in Gabon =

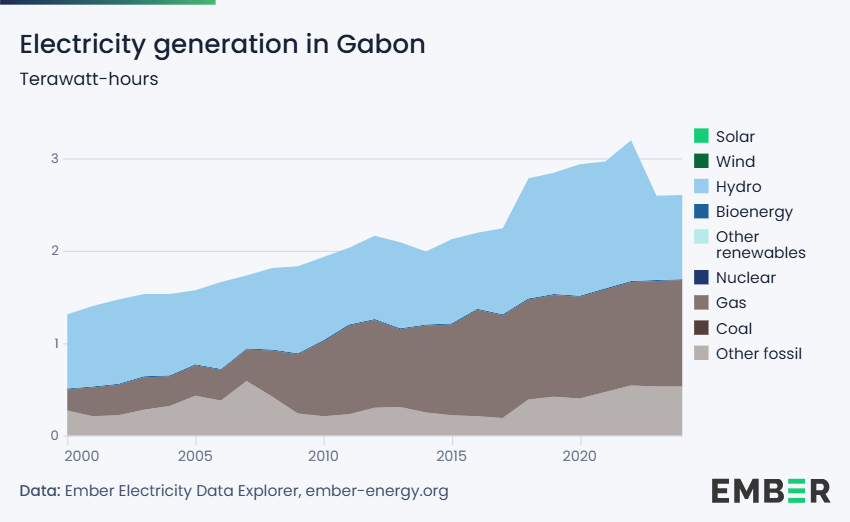
Electricity generation in Gabon in terawatt-hours

Energy in Gabon comes from two main sources: solid biofuels and waste (accounting for 75%), and fossil fuels, particularly oil. Just under half (48%) of Gabon's share of power generation comes from renewables. The country is heavily reliant on oil exports, such as crude oil and petroleum. In terms its oil reserves, the country is one of the richest in sub-Sharan Africa, ranking 5th after Nigeria, Angola, Sudan, South Sudan, and Uganda. Gabon is one of Africa’s biggest crude oil producers. However, the country aims to diversify its economy by further developing its agriculture, fisheries, technology, and ecotourism sectors.

Nearly two-thirds of the population of Gabon has access to electricity. However, rural electrification remains limited - only 15% of rural areas had electricity as of 2014. The country aims to provide electricity to 85% of rural areas by 2025 and universal access to electricity by 2035. Most of Gabon's rural population is dependent on biomass fuels for cooking and heating, such as wood and charcoal.

== Energy sources ==
=== Oil ===
Gabon, a former OPEC member (1975–1994) that rejoined in 2016, is the sixth-largest oil producer in sub-Saharan Africa.

The first national oil company was the Société Nationale Petrolière Gabonaise but it was disbanded in 1987. The government of Gabon controls all petroleum and mineral rights within the state. In 2011 a presidential decree created the Gabon Oil Company (GOC). This new entity works in partnership with international companies operating in Gabon and operates two fields: Obangue and Remboue.

As of 2023, Gabon produces about 200,000 barrels a day (bpd) of crude oil.

=== Hydropower ===
Hydropower accounted for 3% of Gabon's electric power supply in 2022.

== Climate change commitments ==
Gabon’s economy remains heavily dependent on oil and other natural resources, leaving it exposed to global market shifts and climate-related risks. In 2023, the country accounted for just over 0.04% of global greenhouse gas emissions (24.7 million tonnes). Gabon has pledged to stay carbon neutral beyond 2050 and, with adequate support, aims to maintain net carbon removals of 100 million tons CO_{2} equivalent per year beyond that date. It also seeks to expand its renewable energy sector.
