= Oklo =

Region containing uranium ore in Haut-Ogooué, Gabon

Coordinates: 1°23′40″S 13°9′39″E

The natural nuclear fission reactors of Oklo: 1. Nuclear reactor zones; 2. Sandstone; 3. Uranium ore layer; 4. Granite

Oklo is a geological region near Franceville in the Haut-Ogooué Province of Gabon. Several natural nuclear fission reactors were discovered in the uranium mines in the region in 1972.

== Natural nuclear fission reactor ==
Some of the mined uranium was found to have a lower concentration of uranium-235 than expected, as if it had already been in a nuclear reactor. When geologists investigated they also found products typical of a reactor. They concluded that the deposit had been in a reactor: a natural nuclear fission reactor, around 1.8 to 1.7 billion years BP—in the Paleoproterozoic Era during Precambrian times, during the Statherian period—and continued for a few hundred thousand years, probably averaging less than 100 kW of thermal power during that time. At that time the natural uranium had a concentration of about 3% ^{235}U and could have reached criticality with natural water as neutron moderator allowed by the special geometry of the deposit.

== See also ==
- List of uranium projects
