= Franceville basin =

1.6–2.1 billion year old sedimentary basin in Gabon

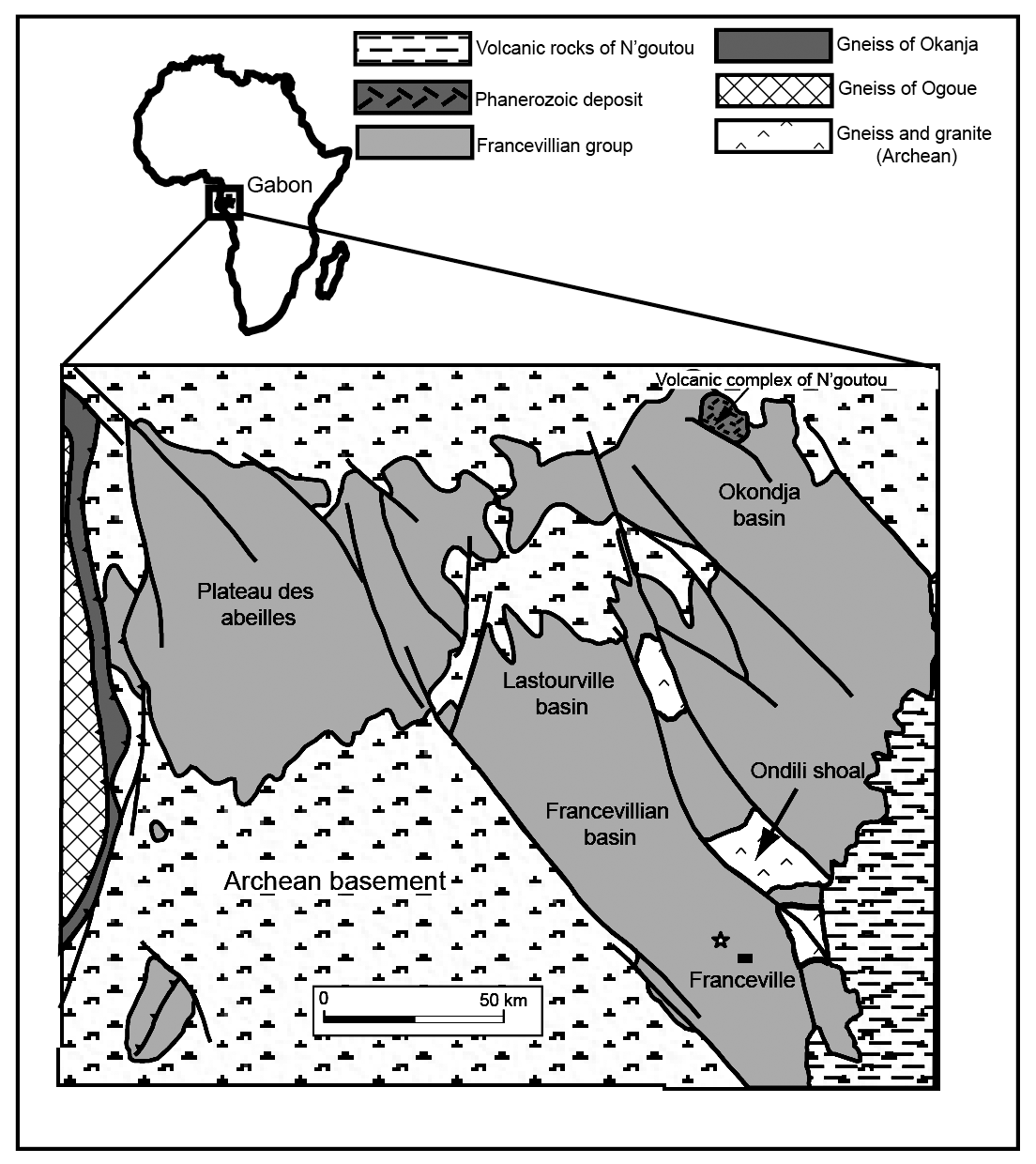
Map of Francevillian basin geology

The Franceville Basin is a 1.6–2.1 billion year old sedimentary basin in Gabon. It contains unmetamorphosed sediments. It is notable for containing the Francevillian biota, which are possibly the oldest multicellular life known. A natural fission reactor formed there about 1.8 - 2.1 billion years ago.

== Geology ==
The Franceville Basin covers approximately 25,000 km^{2} and is made up of unmetamorphosed sediment derived mainly from eroded Mesoarchaean tonalite–trondhjemite–granodiorites. It is over a kilometer thick, with various sources claiming 2.5-4 kilometers as the maximum depth. Around 1.8-2.1 billion years ago a natural fission reactor formed, nicknamed the "Oklo reactor". The resulting fission by-products were held in place by a clay layer.

== See also ==
- Francevillian B Formation
- Geology of Gabon
