= Olympique de Mandji =

Association football club in Gabon

- Founded: 2009
- Ground: Stade Pierre Claver Divounguy

Olympique de Mandji are a football club based in Port-Gentil, Gabon.

The club first played in the Gabon Championnat National D1 during the 2015–16 season.
