= Port-Gentil FC =

- Full name: Port-Gentil Football Club
- Ground: Stade Pierre Claver Divounguy; Port-Gentil, Gabon
- Capacity: 7,000
Home colours	Away colours

Port-Gentil Football Club, also known as POG FC, is a Gabonese football club based in Port-Gentil, Gabon.

The club currently plays in Gabon Championnat National D1.

== Stadium ==
Currently the team plays at the 7,000 capacity Stade Pierre Claver Divounguy.

== League participations ==
- Gabon Championnat National D1: 2013–14
- Gabon Second Division: 2012–13
