= Adouma FC =

Gabonese football club

- Full name: Adouma Football Club
- Founded: 1950
- League: Gabon Championnat National D1
Home colours	Away colours

Adouma FC is a football club from Lastoursville, Gabon. Forfeiting a game because of payment delays, they were one of four teams to withdraw for this reason. LINAF president Brice Mbika Ndjambou chose to convene a meeting of Gabon Championnat National D1 club officials in response- deciding put all four clubs under trusteeship so that the situation will never arise again. Adouma FC had asked to postpone the match but the request was declined by AS Mangasport, the team they forfeited against.

Crowned champion of the 2014-15 Gabon Championnat National D3, they got promoted in the 2015-16 Gabon Championnat National D2, leading by Day 11.

== Crest & Team Colors ==
Adouma's emblem depicts an elephant crossing a bridge with water underneath. The water may be reference to the Adouma people occupying areas near the Ogooué River. Their colors are dark blue.
