= AS Dikaki =

- Ground: Stade Mbombet, Mouila

Association Sportive Dikaki are a football club based in Fougamou, Ngounié Province Gabon.

The team play their games in Mouila, the capital of the Ngounié Province.

The club won promotion to the Gabon Championnat National D1 in 2018.
