= Société Nationale Petrolière Gabonaise =

Société Nationale Petrolière Gabonaise (SNPG) was the national petroleum company of Gabon.

SNGP was founded in 1979 and disbanded in 1987. After that, the country had no national petroleum company until the Gabon Oil Company was established in June 2011.

== Operations ==
The government of Gabon controls petroleum and mineral rights within the state. Gabon's oil reserves are onshore, shallow water and deep water exploration blocks and working fields.

Among the companies involved in contractual oil and gas work in Gabon are Africa Energy, Shell, Elf Gabon/TotalFinaElf, Vaalco Energy and Agip Gabon/ENI.

Crudes:

- Rabi Light
- Mandji Blend

Major oil fields and operators:

- Atora Field Elf Gabon
- Gamba Field
- Limande Field ENI
- Rabi-Kounga Field Shell

In 1996 Gabon resigned from OPEC, stating that membership in the group was disadvantageous to its oil industry.

Société Gabonaise de Raffinage, known as Sogara, operates an oil refinery in Port Gentil.

== See also ==
- Energy in Gabon
