= Francevillian biota =

Possible Palaeoproterozoic multicellular fossils from Gabon

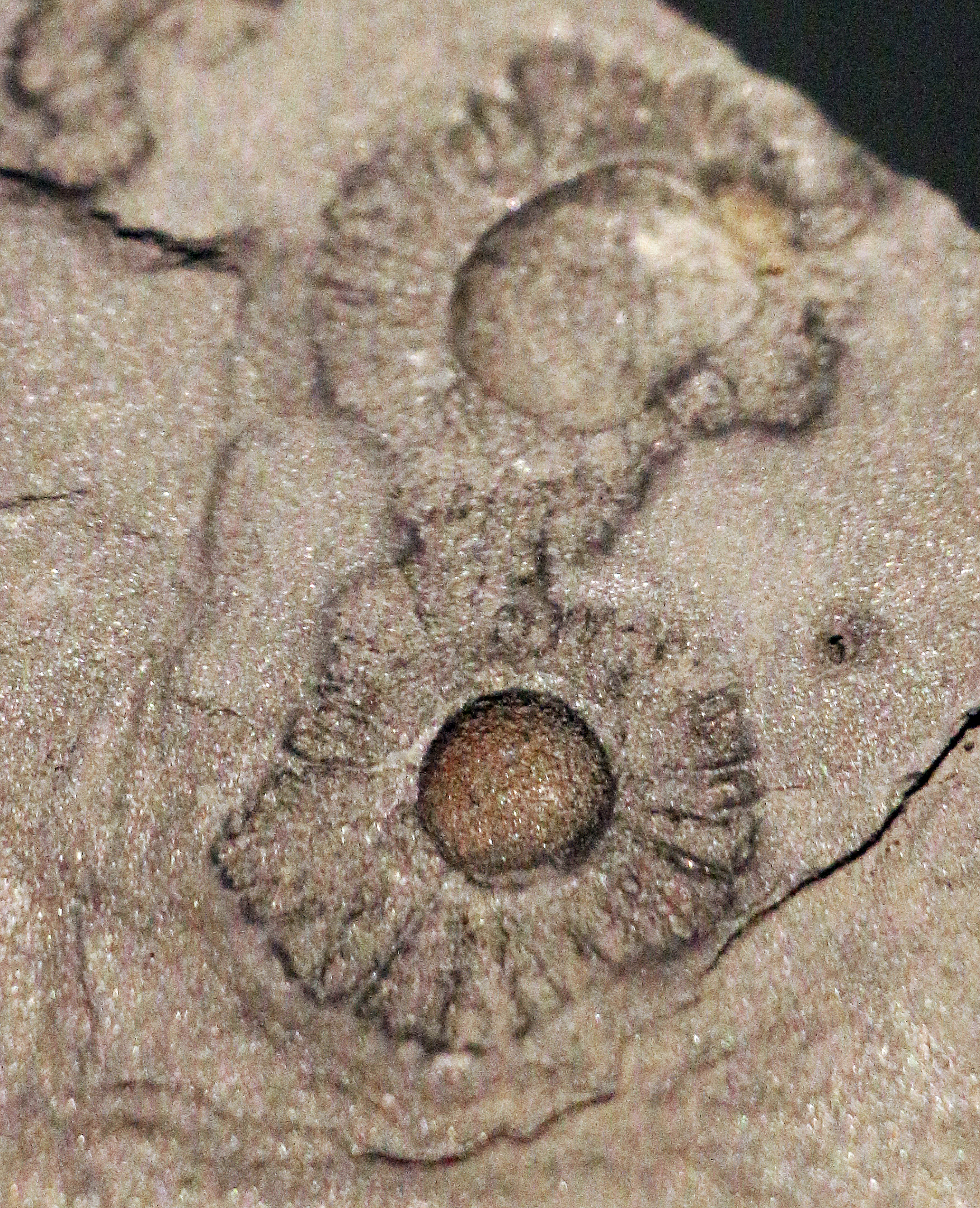
Example of macroscopic structure referred to as Francevillian biota

The Francevillian biota (Also referred to as Gabon macrofossils, Gabonionta or Francevillian group fossils) are a collection of 2.1-billion-year-old Palaeoproterozoic macroscopic structures, controversially suggested to be fossils, known from the Francevillian B Formation in Gabon, a black shale province notable for its lack of any noticeable metamorphism. The structures have been postulated by some authors to be evidence of the earliest form of multicellular life, and of eukaryotes. They were discovered by an international team led by Moroccan geologist Abderrazak El Albani, of the University of Poitiers, France. While they have yet to be assigned to a formal taxonomic position, they have been informally and collectively referred to as the "Gabonionta", including by the Natural History Museum Vienna in 2014. The status of the structures as fossils has been questioned, and they remain a subject of debate.

== Morphology ==
Members of the Francevillian biota

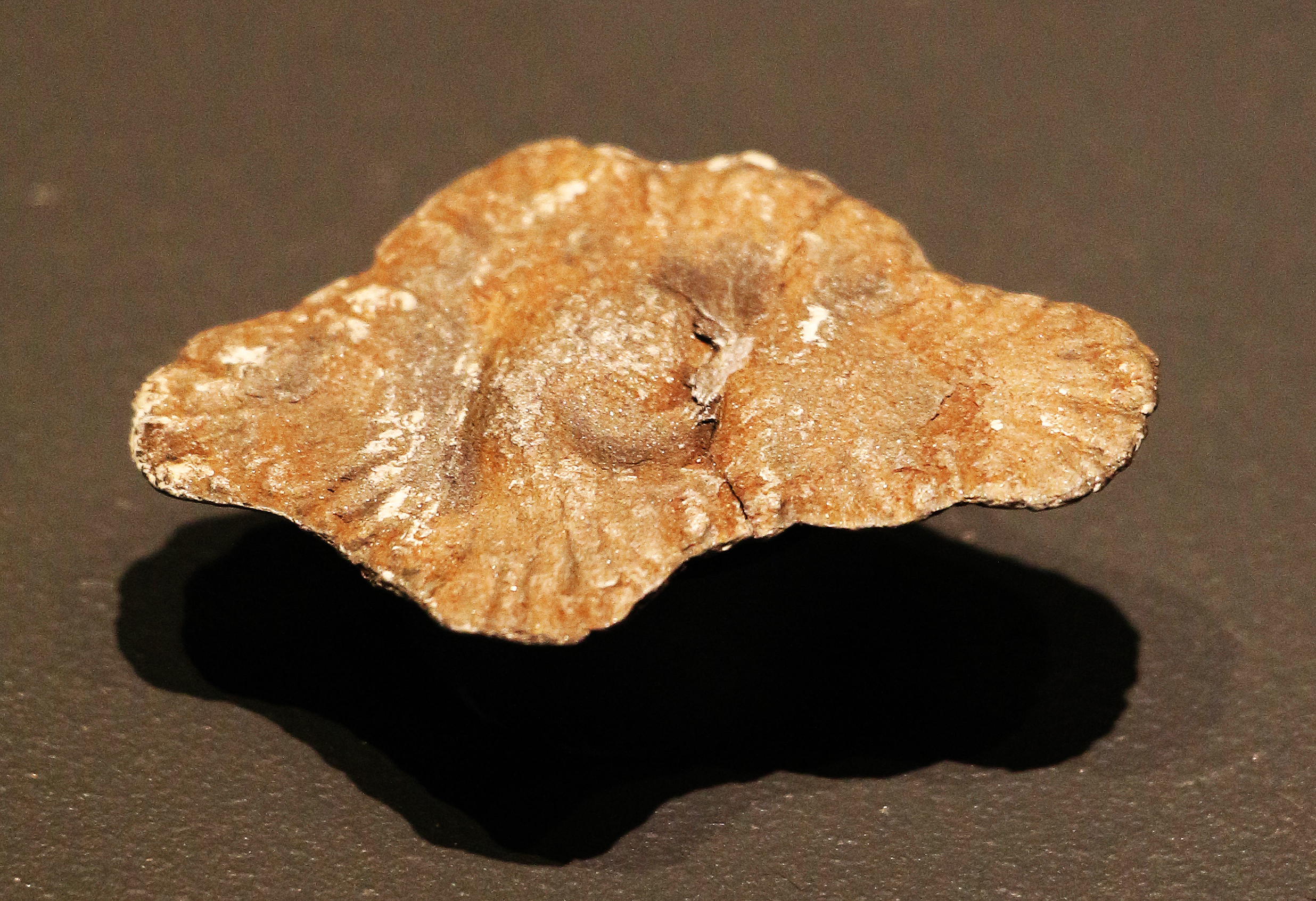
Francevillian biota macroscopic structure on display at the Natural History Museum, Vienna.

The structures are up to 17 centimetres (6.7 in) in size. They form flattened disks with a characteristic morphology, including circular and elongated specimens. A spherical to ellipsoidal central body is bounded by radial structures. The structures show three-dimensionality and purportedly coordinated growth.

A newer 2014 study by El Albani et al. describes multiple types of structures with different morphologies. There are convoluted tubes, and "string of pearls"-like structures that terminate in a "flower". This is similar to dictyostelid slime molds, amoebal organisms that form multicellular assemblies to migrate. However, the structures cannot simply be dictyostelids as dictyostelids are not marine organisms. Among known fossils, the Ediacaran Nemiana and Beltanelloides are most similar when compared to the "string of pearls".

In 2023, more structures were studied by El Albani and colleagues, which were characterized by the authors as eukaryotes. They appear to be flattened lenticular disks reaching up to 4.5 centimetres (1.8 in) in diameter, with a chambered interior surrounded by a notched ridge about one-sixth of the diameter in width. The authors hypothesized this to play a role in their movement through the water column, as they suggested the organisms were likely planktonic. The structures were found to have an unusual concentration of zinc compared to the surrounding sediments, an element performing key functions in eukaryote biochemistry.

== Locality ==
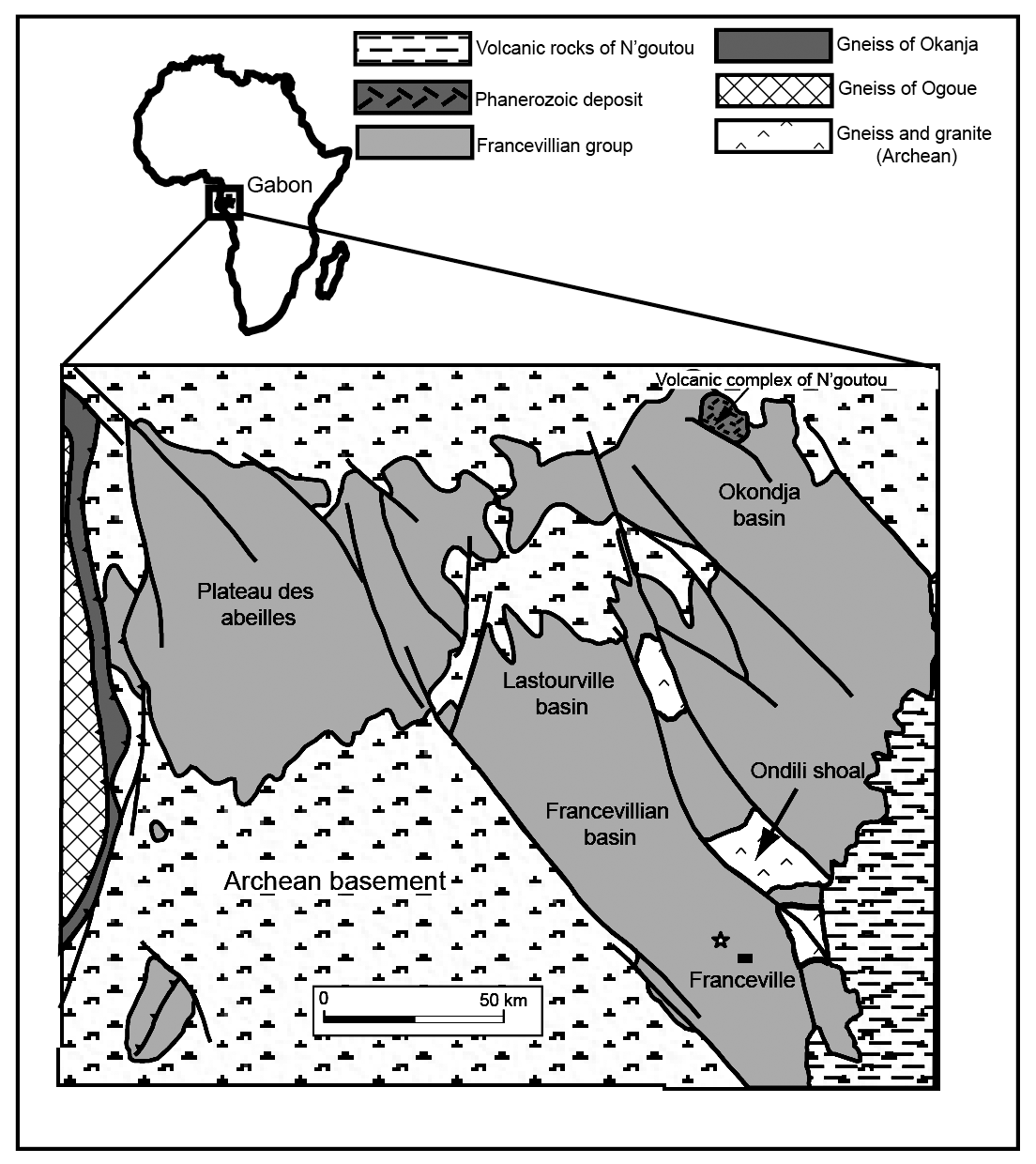
Geology of the Francevillian basin

The findings come from shales of the Franceville basin with a high density of up to 40 structures per square meter (3.72 per square foot). The authors proposed that the organisms survived at the bottom in shallow sea water in colonies. The geochemistry of the site indicates that the structures formed in sediment under an oxygenated water column of a prograding delta, and if they were biological might have engaged in aerobic respiration.

== Interpretations ==
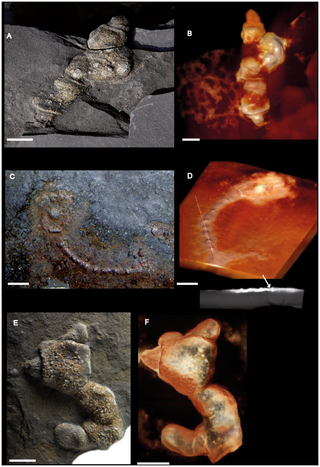
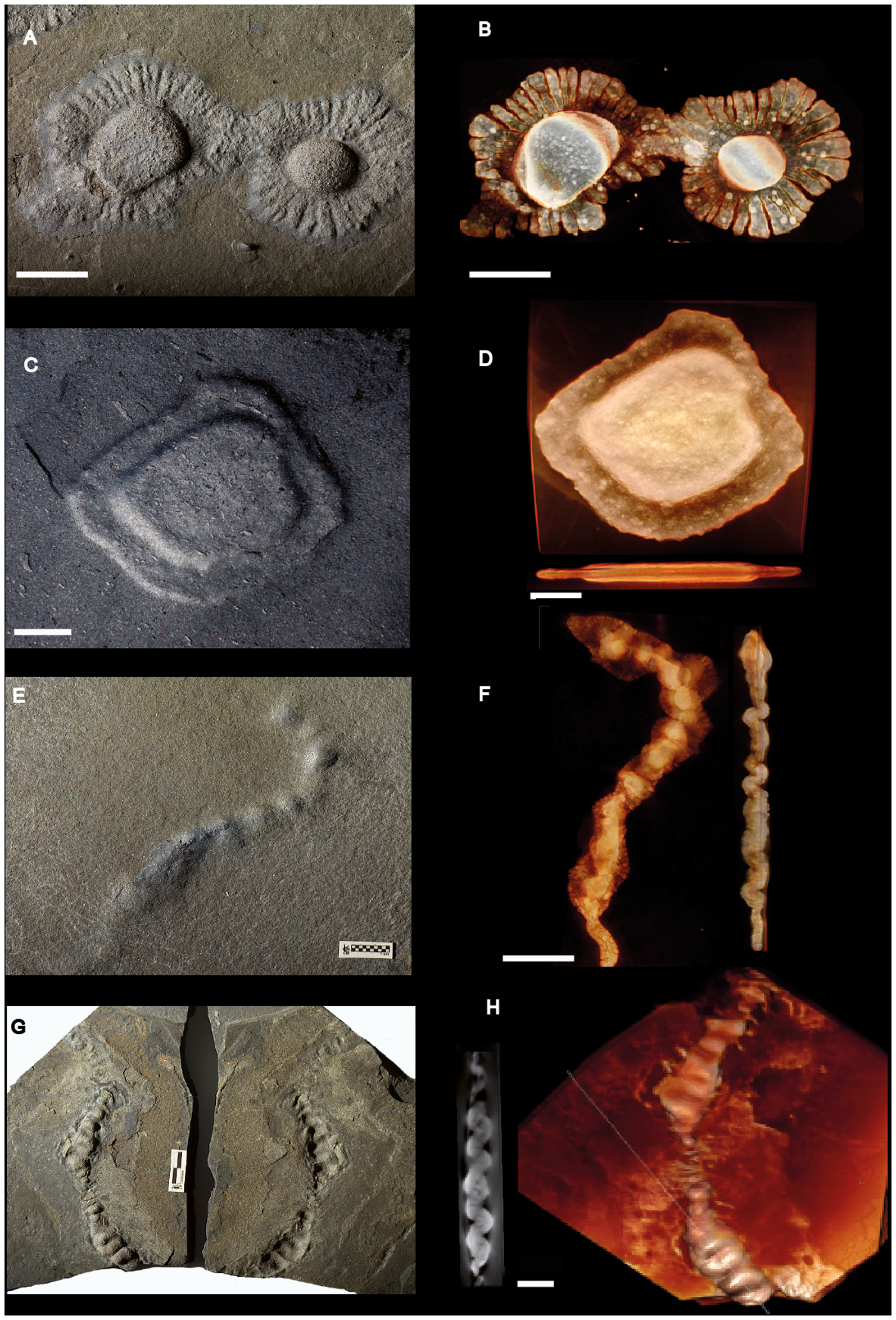
Examples of supposed pyritized macrofossil assemblages from El Albani et al., 2014

In describing the structures, El Albani and colleagues described them as colonial organisms with possible affinities to eukaryotes, akin to microbial mats, albeit unlike any known structures in the fossil record, yet noting the complexity of the structures and presence of sterane as suggestive of possible eukaryote identity. In a concurrent news report in Nature, paleontologist Philip Donoghue of Bristol University advocates a more conservative approach pending further evidence before calling them eukaryotes.

Another view, held by Yale's Adolf Seilacher, interprets the structures as not organisms at all, but rather pseudofossils of inorganic pyrites. El Albani and colleagues (2014) explicitly disputed Seilacher's interpretation. A 2016 study of similar structures in Michigan, around 1.1 billion years old found them to be concretions, which the authors suggested cast doubt on the biogenicity of the Francevillian structures. In a 2017 review paper Emmanuelle Javaux and Kevin Lepot stated that the biogenic nature of the macroscopic structures was "questionable". Miao et al. 2019 stated that due to the "simple morphology and lack of diagnostic features, their eukaryotic affiliation still remains uncertain". A 2023 review suggested that the structures were potentially artifacts of diagenesis, and that reliably distinguishing between biogenic and abiogenic structures in Paleoproterozoic rocks could be "extremely difficult", and therefore the Francevillian Biota and other supposed multicellular fossils of a similar age "currently fail to pass the stringent criteria for these structures to be viewed as bona fide fossils". A 2023 isotopic analysis of the structures found that they were enriched in zinc, cobalt and nickel isotopes, with the zinc being preferentially enriched in light isotopes, which the authors suggested could represent eukaryotic metabolism. However they noted that the Francevillian Biota is still 400 million years older than is currently widely accepted for the earliest known eukaryotes. Ernest Chi Fru and colleagues (including El Albani) argued in 2024 that there is evidence of nutrients conducive to animal life in the deposits. A 2023 review of the eukaryotic fossil record considered the interpretation of the "Francevillian Biota" as biological structures as unconfirmed, though if of biological origin they considered a multicellular interpretation plausible. However they suggested that even if it represented evidence of multicellularity, there was no clear evidence that it was eukaryotic.

== See also ==
- Ediacaran biota
- History of life
- Francevillian B Formation
- Franceville basin
- Great Oxidation Event
