= Stade Mbéba =

Stadium in Lastoursville, Gabon

The Stade Mbéba is a stadium primarily used for football matches in Lastoursville, Gabon. It is the home of the Gabonese club Wongosport of the Gabon Championnat National D1. The stadium has capacity of 4,000 spectators.
