= Lozo Sport =

- Ground: Stade Mbeba, Lastoursville

Lozo Sport are a football club based in Lastoursville, Gabon.

The club won promotion to the Gabon Championnat National D1 in 2016.
