= Gabon Oil Company =

- Société Nationale des Hydrocarbures de Gabon

Agency overview
- Formed: 2011
- Preceding agency: Société Nationale Petrolière Gabonaise
- Jurisdiction: Gabon
- Headquarters: Boulevard Georges Rawiri, Libreville, Gabon
- Agency executive: Odette Nzaba Makaya, Director General
- Website: www.gabonoil.com

The Gabon Oil Company is the national oil and gas company of the African nation of Gabon. It is the successor to the Société Nationale Petrolière Gabonaise, which was disbanded in 1987. After that, Gabon had no national petroleum company until the Gabon Oil Company was established in June 2011.

== Operations ==
The government of Gabon controls petroleum and mineral rights within the state. Gabon's oil reserves are onshore, shallow water and deep water exploration blocks (geographic areas) and working fields. By the late 1990s, Gabon was producing 370,000 barrels of crude petroleum a day (bpd). Perenco, Shell, and TotalEnergies controlled 75 percent of the nation's total oil production.

Gabon Oil Company was created in 2011 by presidential decree, and became the legal owner and manager of onshore and offshore petroleum in Gabon. Under a new hydrocarbon law passed in 2020, the government of Gabon automatically owns a 20 percent ownership interest in all petroleum development in the nation, with Gabon Oil able to purchase up to an additional 15 percent stake.

Initially, the company focused on marketing crude and refined oil produced by private companies.

While Gabon was without a national oil company, it leased and sold blocks for petroleum development to outside interests. Addax Petroleum, a Chinese company, surrendered its lease on the marginal Remboué oil field in September 2012, and Gabon Oil took control of the block. It was the first exploration and production contract signed by the new company. By 2014, Gabon was producing just 250,000 bpd, and was now sub-Sarahan Africa's fifth-largest oil producer. Gabon Oil's chief executive officer, Serge Toulekima, announced in May 2014 that the company would seek to buy in to these leases as a means of boosting the government's revenue as well as providing developers with capital to expand exploration and production. National oil production fell to just 220,000 bpd by early 2016. In October 2016, the company signed its first upstream contract, beginning production of 1,500 bpd in the Mboumba oil field.

Gabon Oil took a 10 percent ownership interest in March 2019 in the Dussafu block held by BW Offshore. The cost of the transaction was estimated to be $28.5 million, and represented a reimbursement of 10 percent of development and production costs from April 2017 to date.

By the end of 2018, Gabon was the third-largest oil producer in sub-Saharan Africa. Only Angola and Nigeria produced more oil. Gabon Oil had conducted 12 auctions of shallow- and deep-water block leases by 2020. Profits from crude oil exploration and production are notoriously slow to emerge, and Gabon Oil was unlikely to see substantial income from its activities until 2025 or later.

As of August 2021, however, Gabon was only sub-Saharan Africa's eighth-largest oil producer. The country had 2 billion barrels of proven oil reserves, and crude and refined oil exports accounted for 80 percent of the nation's exports. Nearly all of its oil wells were mature, and little deep-water exploration had occurred. The government initiated a new policy to encourage multinational oil companies to source work and materials from small- and medium-sized businesses in Gabon.In November 2021, Gabon Oil and French firm Maurel & Prom agreed to pay US$43 million to reimburse Gabon Oil for pre-2018 carrying costs on the Ezanga block. (Note: This represented the debt Gabon Oil owed to Maurel & Prom.) Maurel & Prom also paid an additional US$57 million to extend the Ezanga lease agreement to 2026, and to amend various terms of the lease.

In late 2021, Gabon Oil also signed exploration and production sharing agreements (EPSAs) for the Kari block and Nyanga-Mayombe block with Maurel & Prom. Gabon Oil owns a 100 percent interest in these blocks. Director General Odette Nzaba Makaya said Gabon Oil would try to boost its stake in the country's oil leases to generate more income.

As of 2023, Gabon produces about 200,000 barrels a day (bpd) of crude oil.

In March 2024, the Gabon Oil Company took over operations of the Tsiengui and Obangue fields when the production-sharing contract with Chinese-owned Adday Petroleum expired. The combined production of both fields is about 5,000 barrels per day.

The GOC acquired Assala Energuy in June 2024, which included seven onshore producing licenses, the Gamba oil export terminal and a pipeline network. After the acquisition, production increased from about 48,000 barrels a day in June 2024 to 57,068 barrels per day by 8 November 2025, and in September 2026, production remained at 57,000 barrels per day.

On 27 March 2025, the GOC signed an acquisition agreement for SMP Afrique, the French oilfield drilling and maintenance company.

On 29 July 2025, Tullow Oil Gabon S.A. was acquired by GOC for $307 million, $220 million from a Gunvor loan and the remaining $87 million from GOC company funds.

The GOC took on a 15% working-interest from operator ReconAfrica on 8 September 2025, into the Block C-7, now named Ngulu. The remaining working interests are held by Record Resources with 20% and the Gabonese state with 10%.

The GOC owned Assala Energy reported 8-meter hydrocarbon intervals in the Gamba Sandstone formations in March 2026 at the Magoga-A drilling exploration well, part of the Mutamba Iroru II license.

== Corporate governance ==
In October 2015, Serge Toulekima, the Director General of Gabon Oil Company, resigned when he refused to submit a financial and technical audit to the Gabonese government. Toulekima was temporarily replaced by Arnaud Calixte Engandji Alandji, formerly the Secretary General of the National Organization of Petroleum Employees (ONEP), a powerful Gabonese trade union.

Christian Patrichi Tanasa Mbadinga was named the permanent new Director General about May 2018. In 2020, the Gabonese newspaper L'Union reported that since 2018 more than XAF85 billion (US$144 million) had gone missing at Gabon Oil Company due to corruption. He was forced out by government authorities in May 2021, and Gabonese geologist Odette Nzaba Makaya was appointed the new Director General. Patrichi was arraigned in before the Cour Criminelle Spéciale (Special Criminal Court) in March 2022 on charges of embezzling more than XAF85 billion from Gabon Oil. In July 2022, Christian Patrichi Tanasa, former general manager of Gabon Oil Company, was tried for embezzlement, complicity in embezzlement and money laundering. The Court followed the requisitions against the three defendants, sentencing Christian Patrichi Tanasa to 12 years in prison. prison, and his deputy to 10 years. The third defendant was acquitted.
