= Abderrazak El Albani =

Moroccan sedimentologist and professor

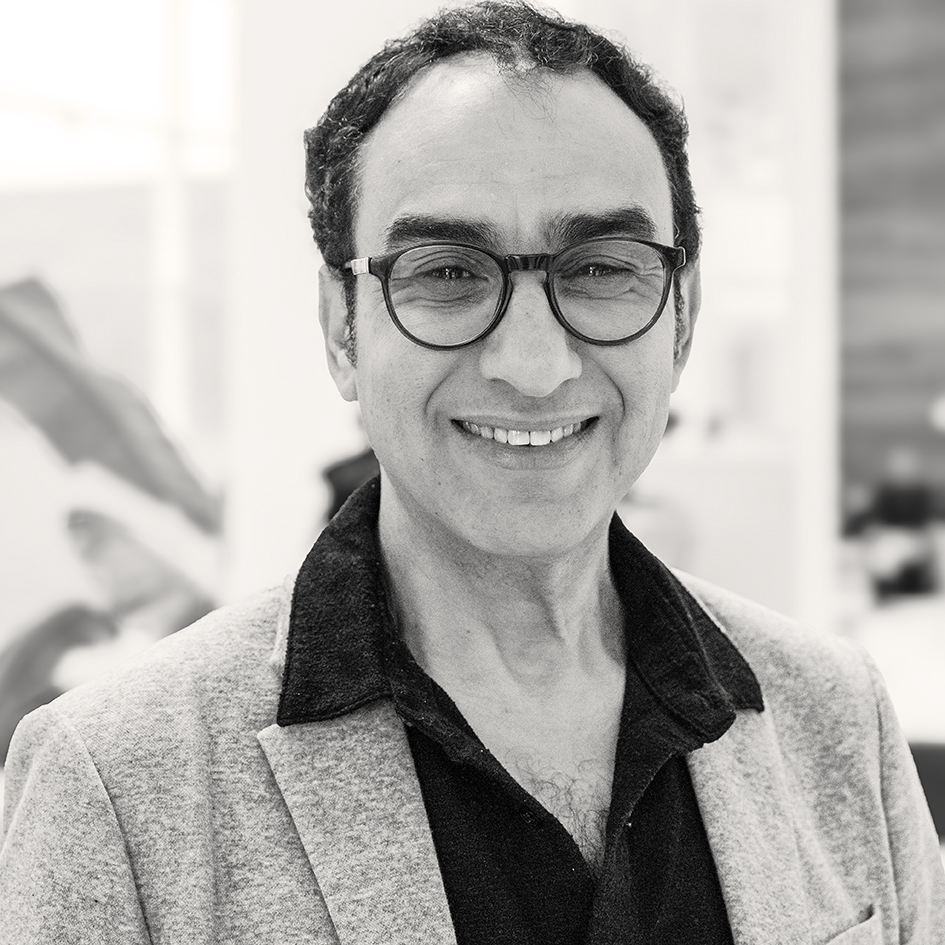
- Born: Marrakesh, Morocco
- Education: Lille University of Science and Technology
- Occupations: Geologist, researcher
- Employer(s): University of Poitiers, National Center for Scientific Research

Abderrazak El Albani is a Moroccan sedimentologist, professor at University of Poitiers at the Hydrasa laboratory (IC2MP - CNRS). He is known for describing the "Francevillian Biota" from the Paleoproterozoic of Gabon, which he suggests represents the oldest known multicellular organisms, though this claim has been questioned by other authors.

== Biography ==
Moroccan geologist, born in Marrakesh, he studied at the University of Lille, from which he received a doctorate after defending a thesis on geology and sedimentary geochemistry. Between 1996 and 1998, he spent a postdoctoral period at the University of Kiel, in Germany. He published several scientific articles on Paleo-environments, Geobiology and Diagenesis in sedimentary basins. He then joined the Hydrasa laboratory (University of Poitiers – CNRS) in 1999. He was appointed Professor in 2010.

== Books ==
- El Albani, A., Macchiarelli, R., Meunier, A. (2016). Aux origines de la vie – une nouvelle histoire de l'évolution. Dunod Paris, 224 pp., many b/w pictures in the text, 8 tables of color photos. ISBN 978-2-10-073791-8.
- Troppenz, U.-M., Schmälzle, D. (2015). Wohin die Spuren führen – das neue Bild des Präkambriums: Franceville-, Montana und Ediacarafauna. Tetrada Parchim, 192 pp., 162 photos, 2 time tables. ISBN 978-3-00-047871-0.
- Troppenz, U.-M. (2017). The New Precambrian – no "boring", but bustling billions in a succession of evolutions and global catastrophes. Tetrada Parchim, 140 pp., 115 photos, 2 time tables. ISBN 978-3-00-054215-2.
