= Natural nuclear fission reactor =

Naturally occurring uranium self-sustaining nuclear chain reactions

A natural nuclear fission reactor is a uranium deposit where self-sustaining nuclear chain reactions occur through natural geological processes rather than human construction. The possibility of such reactors existing in situ within an ore body moderated by groundwater was proposed by Paul Kuroda in 1956. The first confirmed example was discovered in 1972 in Oklo, Gabon, by researchers from the French Atomic Energy Commission (CEA) after chemists detected sharp depletions of fissile ^{235}U in gaseous uranium hexafluoride made from Gabonese ore.

The existence of the Oklo reactors was confirmed through analysis of isotope ratios of uranium and of the fission products (and the stable daughter nuclides of those fission products). Oklo remains the only known location where this phenomenon is known to have occurred, consisting of sixteen sites with patches of centimeter-sized ore layers. There, self-sustaining nuclear fission reactions are thought to have taken place approximately 1.7 billion years ago, during the Statherian period of the Paleoproterozoic. Fission in the ore at Oklo continued off and on for a few hundred thousand years and probably never exceeded 100 kW of thermal power.

Life on Earth at this time consisted largely of sea-bound algae and the first eukaryotes, living under a 2% oxygen atmosphere. However, even this meager oxygen was likely essential to the concentration of uranium into fissionable ore bodies, as uranium dissolves in water only in the presence of oxygen. Before the planetary-scale production of oxygen by the early photosynthesizers, groundwater-moderated natural nuclear reactors are not thought to have been possible.

== Discovery of the Oklo fossil reactors ==
In May 1972, at the Tricastin uranium enrichment site at Pierrelatte, France, routine mass spectrometry comparing UF_{6} samples from the Oklo mine showed a discrepancy in the amount of the ^{235}U isotope. Where the usual concentrations of ^{235}U were 0.72%, the Oklo samples showed only 0.60%. This was a significant difference—the samples bore 17% less ^{235}U than expected. This discrepancy required explanation, as all civilian uranium handling facilities must meticulously account for all fissionable isotopes to ensure that none are diverted into the construction of unsanctioned nuclear weapons. Further, as fissile material is the reason for mining uranium in the first place, the missing 17% was also of direct economic concern.

Geological situation in Gabon leading to natural nuclear fission reactors: 1. Nuclear reactor zones; 2. Sandstone; 3. Uranium ore layer; 4. Granite

Thus, the French Atomic Energy Commission (CEA) began an investigation. A series of measurements of the relative abundances of the two most significant isotopes of uranium mined at Oklo showed anomalous results compared to those obtained for uranium from other mines. Further investigations into this uranium deposit discovered uranium ore with a ^{235}U concentration as low as 0.44% (almost 40% below the normal value). Subsequent examination of isotopes of fission products such as neodymium and ruthenium also showed anomalies, as described in more detail below. However, the trace radioisotope ^{234}U did not deviate significantly in its concentration from other natural samples. Both depleted uranium and reprocessed uranium will usually have ^{234}U concentrations significantly different from the secular equilibrium of 55 ppm ^{234}U relative to ^{238}U. This is due to ^{234}U being enriched together with ^{235}U and due to it being both consumed by neutron capture and produced from ^{235}U by fast-neutron-induced (n,2n) reactions in nuclear reactors. In Oklo, any possible deviation of ^{234}U concentration present at the time the reactor was active would have long since decayed away. ^{236}U must have also been present in higher-than-usual ratios during the time the reactor was operating, but due to its half-life of 2.348×10^{7} years being almost two orders of magnitude shorter than the time elapsed since the reactor operated, it has decayed to roughly 1.4×10^{−22} its original value and below any abilities of current equipment to detect.

This loss in ^{235}U is exactly what happens in a nuclear reactor. A possible explanation was that the uranium ore had operated as a natural fission reactor in the distant geological past. Other observations led to the same conclusion, and on 25 September 1972, the CEA announced their finding that self-sustaining nuclear chain reactions had occurred on Earth about 2 billion years ago. Later, other natural nuclear fission reactors were discovered in the region.

Nd	143	144	145	146	148	150
C/M	0.99	1.00	1.00	1.01	0.98	1.06

== Fission product isotope signatures ==
Isotope signatures of natural neodymium and fission product neodymium from ^{235}U which had been subjected to thermal neutrons.

=== Neodymium ===
The neodymium (Nd) found at Oklo has a different isotopic composition to that of natural neodymium: the latter contains 27% ^{142}Nd, while that of Oklo contains less than 6%. The ^{142}Nd is not produced by fission; the ore contains both fission-produced and natural neodymium. From this ^{142}Nd content, we can subtract the natural neodymium and gain access to the isotopic composition of neodymium produced by the fission of ^{235}U. The two isotopes ^{143}Nd and ^{145}Nd lead to the formation of ^{144}Nd and ^{146}Nd by neutron capture. This excess must be corrected (see above) to obtain agreement between this corrected isotopic composition and that deduced from fission yields.

=== Ruthenium ===
Isotope signatures of natural ruthenium and fission product ruthenium from ^{235}U which had been subjected to thermal neutrons. The ^{100}Mo (an extremely long-lived double beta emitter) has not had time to decay to ^{100}Ru in more than trace quantities over the time since the reactors stopped working.

Similar investigations into the isotopic ratios of ruthenium (Ru) at Oklo found a much higher ^{99}Ru concentration than otherwise naturally occurring (27–30% vs. 12.7%). This anomaly could be explained by the decay of ^{99}Tc to ^{99}Ru. In the bar chart, the normal natural isotope signature of ruthenium is compared with that for fission product ruthenium which is the result of the fission of ^{235}U with thermal neutrons. The fission ruthenium has a different isotope signature. The level of ^{100}Ru in the fission product mixture is low because fission produces neutron rich isotopes which subsequently beta decay and ^{100}Ru would only be produced in appreciable quantities by double beta decay of the very long-lived (half-life 7.1×10^{18} years) molybdenum isotope ^{100}Mo. On the timescale of when the reactors were in operation, very little (about 0.17 ppb) decay to ^{100}Ru will have occurred. Other pathways of ^{100}Ru production like neutron capture in ^{99}Ru or ^{99}Tc (quickly followed by beta decay) can only have occurred during high neutron flux and thus ceased when the fission chain reaction stopped.

== Mechanism ==
The natural nuclear reactor at Oklo formed when a uranium-rich mineral deposit became inundated with groundwater, which could act as a moderator for the neutrons produced by nuclear fission. A chain reaction took place, producing heat that caused the groundwater to boil away; without a moderator that could slow the neutrons, however, the reaction slowed or stopped. The reactor thus had a negative void coefficient of reactivity, something employed as a safety mechanism in human-made light water reactors. After cooling of the mineral deposit, the water returned, and the reaction restarted, completing a full cycle every 3 hours. The fission reaction cycles continued for hundreds of thousands of years and ended when the ever-decreasing fissile materials, coupled with the build-up of neutron poisons, no longer could sustain a chain reaction.

Fission of uranium normally produces five known isotopes of the fission-product gas xenon; all five have been found trapped in the remnants of the natural reactor, in varying concentrations. The concentrations of xenon isotopes, found trapped in mineral formations 2 billion years later, make it possible to calculate the specific time intervals of reactor operation: approximately 30 minutes of criticality followed by 2 hours and 30 minutes of cooling down (exponentially decreasing residual decay heat) to complete a 3-hour cycle. Xenon-135 is the strongest known neutron poison. However, it is not produced directly in appreciable amounts but rather as a decay product of iodine-135 (or one of its parent nuclides). Xenon-135 itself is unstable and decays to caesium-135 if not allowed to absorb neutrons. While caesium-135 is relatively long lived, all caesium-135 produced by the Oklo reactor has since decayed further to stable barium-135. Meanwhile, xenon-136, the product of neutron capture in xenon-135 decays extremely slowly via double beta decay and thus scientists were able to determine the neutronics of this reactor by calculations based on those isotope ratios almost two billion years after it stopped fissioning uranium.

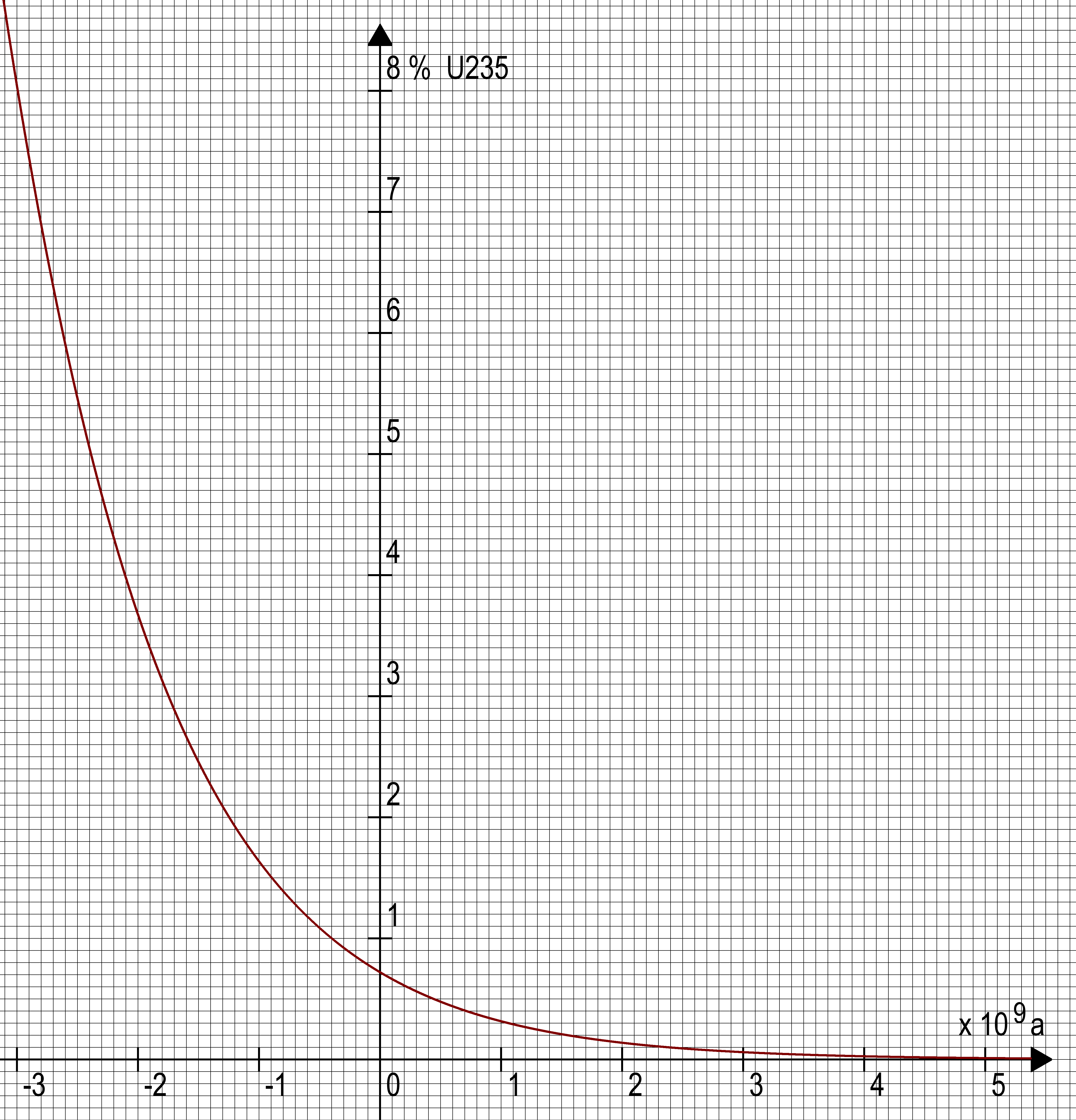
Change of content of Uranium-235 in natural uranium; the content was 3.65% 2 billion years ago.

A key factor that made the reaction possible was that, at the time the reactor went critical 1.7 billion years ago, the fissile isotope ^{235}U made up about 3.1% of the natural uranium, which is comparable to the amount used in some of today's reactors. (The remaining 96.9% was ^{238}U and roughly 55 ppm ^{234}U, neither of which is fissile by slow or moderated neutrons.) Because ^{235}U has a shorter half-life than ^{238}U, and thus decays more rapidly, the current abundance of ^{235}U in natural uranium is only 0.72%. A natural nuclear reactor is therefore no longer possible on Earth without heavy water or graphite.

The Oklo uranium ore deposits are the only known sites in which natural nuclear reactors existed. Other rich uranium ore bodies would also have had sufficient uranium to support nuclear reactions at that time, but the combination of uranium, water, and physical conditions needed to support the chain reaction was unique, as far as is currently known, to the Oklo ore bodies. It is also possible that other natural nuclear fission reactors were once operating but have since been geologically disturbed so much as to be unrecognizable, possibly even "diluting" the uranium so far that the isotope ratio would no longer serve as a "fingerprint". Only a small part of the continental crust and no part of the oceanic crust reaches the age of the deposits at Oklo or an age during which isotope ratios of natural uranium would have allowed a self-sustaining chain reaction with water as a moderator.

Another factor which probably contributed to the start of the Oklo natural nuclear reactor at 2 billion years, rather than earlier, was the increasing oxygen content in the Earth's atmosphere. Uranium is naturally present in the rocks of the earth, and the abundance of fissile ^{235}U was at least 3% or higher at all times prior to reactor startup. Uranium is soluble in water only in the presence of oxygen. Therefore, increasing oxygen levels during the aging of the Earth may have allowed uranium to be dissolved and transported with groundwater to places where a high enough concentration could accumulate to form rich uranium ore bodies. Without the new aerobic environment available on Earth at the time, these concentrations probably could not have taken place.

It is estimated that nuclear reactions in the uranium in centimeter- to meter-sized veins consumed about five tons of ^{235}U and elevated temperatures to a few hundred degrees Celsius. Most of the non-volatile fission products and actinides have only moved centimeters in the veins during the last 2 billion years. Studies have suggested this as a useful natural analogue for nuclear waste disposal. The overall mass defect from the fission of five tons of ^{235}U is about 4.6 kilograms (10 lb). Over its lifetime the reactor produced roughly 100 megatonnes of TNT (420 PJ) in thermal energy, including neutrinos. If one ignores fission of plutonium (which makes up roughly a third of fission events over the course of normal burnup in modern human-made light water reactors), then fission product yields amount to roughly 129 kilograms (284 lb) of technetium-99 (since decayed to ruthenium-99), 108 kilograms (238 lb) of zirconium-93 (since decayed to niobium-93), 198 kilograms (437 lb) of caesium-135 (since decayed to barium-135, but the real value is probably lower as its parent nuclide, xenon-135, is a strong neutron poison and will have absorbed neutrons before decaying to ^{135}Cs in some cases), 28 kilograms (62 lb) of palladium-107 (since decayed to silver), 86 kilograms (190 lb) of strontium-90 (long since decayed to zirconium), and 185 kilograms (408 lb) of caesium-137 (long since decayed to barium).

== Relation to the atomic fine-structure constant ==
The natural reactor of Oklo has been used to check if the atomic fine-structure constant α might have changed over the past 2 billion years. That is because α influences the rate of various nuclear reactions. For example, ^{149}Sm captures a neutron to become ^{150}Sm, and since the rate of neutron capture depends on the value of α, the ratio of the two samarium isotopes in samples from Oklo can be used to calculate the value of α from 2 billion years ago.

Several studies have analysed the relative concentrations of radioactive isotopes left behind at Oklo, and most have concluded that nuclear reactions then were much the same as they are today, which implies that α was the same too.

== See also ==
- Deep geological repository
- Geology of Gabon
- Mounana
- Oklo Inc.

== Sources ==
- Bentridi, S.E.; Gall, B.; Gauthier-Lafaye, F.; Seghour, A.; Medjadi, D. (2011). "Génèse et évolution des réacteurs naturels d'Oklo" [Inception and evolution of Oklo natural nuclear reactors]. Comptes Rendus Geoscience (in French). 343 (11–12): 738–748. Bibcode:2011CRGeo.343..738B. doi:10.1016/j.crte.2011.09.008.
