= Oyem AC =

- Full name: Oyem Athletic Club
- Founded: 2014
- Ground: Stade d'Akouakam, Oyem; Stade d'Oyem, Oyem
- Chairman: Louis Bolunga
- Manager: Évariste Bissema
- Coach: Hervé Mendzaka

Oyem Athletic Club (French: Club d'athlétisme d'Oyem) are a football club based in Oyem, Woleu-Ntem Province, Gabon.

The club won promotion to the Gabon Championnat National D2 by winning the third level Championship in 2015. The club later won promotion to the top tier in 2017.
