= Stade Henri Sylvoz =

Stadium in Moanda, Gabon

Coordinates: 1.5591°S 13.2272°E

The Stade Henri Sylvoz is a stadium primarily used for football matches in Moanda, Gabon. It is the home of the Gabonese team AS Mangasport. The stadium has a seating capacity of 4,000.
