= Stade Migovéen =

- Full name: Stade Migovéen
- Ground: Stade Jean Koumou, Lambaréné, Gabon
- Capacity: 600
- League: Gabon Championnat National D1
- 2026: 9th
Home colours

Stade Migovéen is a football club from Gabon based in Lambaréné in the Moyen-Ogooué Province. The team plays in Gabon Second Division after be relegated by Gabon Championnat National D1.

== Stadium ==
Currently the team plays at the 600 capacity Stade Jean Koumou.

== League participations ==
- Gabon Championnat National D1: 2012/13, 2015-2022
- Gabon Second Division: ?-2012, 2013/14, 2022/23-2024/25
