= Stade Gaston Peyrille =

Stadium in Bitam, Gabon

- Location within Gabon Location within Africa
- Address: Bitam; Gabon
- Coordinates: 2.078698°N 11.50109°E -->

The Stade Gaston Peyrille is a stadium used for football matches in Bitam, Gabon. It is the home of the Gabonese team US Bitam of the Gabon Championnat National D1. The stadium has capacity of 7,000 spectators.
