= Lastoursville =

Lastoursville Mandji
- Location in Gabon
- Coordinates: 0°49′S 12°22′E
- Country: Gabon
- Province: Ogooué-Lolo Province
- Department: Mulundu

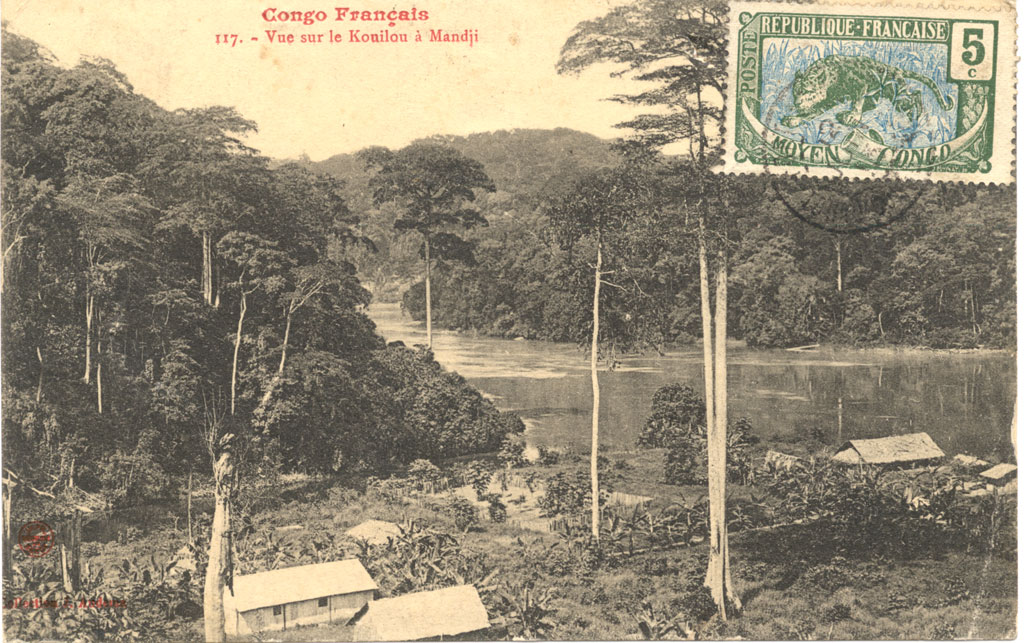
Postcard with view of the Konilou River at Mandji

Lastoursville or Mandji is a city in east-central Gabon, lying on the Ogooué River, the Trans-Gabon Railway and the N3 road. It was founded as a slave depot named Mandji, renamed Maadiville in 1883 before being named for François Rigail de Lastours in 1886. It grew around palm oil production and as an administrative centre, and soon became a major missionary centre. The town is also known for its caves.

The town lies at an elevation of 206 m.

== Caves ==
Occupying a 90-sq-km site, there are more than 40 caves identified, located in dense primary rainforest close to town. Traces of human activity dates back 7000 years, when the caves were used in rituals.

== World Heritage Status ==
The caves were added to the UNESCO World Heritage Tentative List on October 20, 2005 in the Mixed (Cultural + Natural) category.

== Climate ==
Climate data for Lastourville (1961–1990)
Month	Jan	Feb	Mar	Apr	May	Jun	Jul	Aug	Sep	Oct	Nov	Dec	Year
Mean daily maximum °C (°F)	29.8 (85.6)	30.5 (86.9)	30.9 (87.6)	30.7 (87.3)	29.7 (85.5)	28.1 (82.6)	26.7 (80.1)	27.2 (81.0)	28.3 (82.9)	29.7 (85.5)	28.5 (83.3)	28.2 (82.8)	29.0 (84.2)
Daily mean °C (°F)	25.6 (78.1)	25.9 (78.6)	26.1 (79.0)	26.1 (79.0)	25.6 (78.1)	24.4 (75.9)	23.2 (73.8)	23.6 (74.5)	24.1 (75.4)	25.3 (77.5)	24.3 (75.7)	24.3 (75.7)	24.8 (76.6)
Mean daily minimum °C (°F)	21.3 (70.3)	21.3 (70.3)	21.3 (70.3)	21.4 (70.5)	21.4 (70.5)	20.6 (69.1)	19.6 (67.3)	19.9 (67.8)	19.9 (67.8)	20.9 (69.6)	20.1 (68.2)	20.3 (68.5)	20.7 (69.3)
Average precipitation mm (inches)	129.6 (5.10)	138.8 (5.46)	212.3 (8.36)	132.4 (5.21)	192.9 (7.59)	42.1 (1.66)	5.5 (0.22)	19.6 (0.77)	129.0 (5.08)	291.0 (11.46)	277.7 (10.93)	108.9 (4.29)	1,679.8 (66.13)
Average rainy days	9.6	10.1	13.5	13.0	13.9	4.6	2.0	2.7	9.3	18.1	18.1	12.2	127.1
Average relative humidity (%)	83	81	81	79	83	85	85	83	81	82	83	84	82
Mean monthly sunshine hours	149.8	150.5	166.1	158.1	148.9	114.2	80.1	74.2	106.1	136.0	134.9	135.5	1,554.4
Source: NOAA
