= Stade Pierre Claver Divounguy =

Stadium in Port-Gentil, Gabon

- Interactive map of Stade Pierre Claver Divounguy
- Location: Port Gentil
- Coordinates: 0.725749°S 8.783414°E

The Stade Pierre Claver Divounguy is a stadium primarily used for football matches in Port-Gentil, Gabon. It is the home of the Gabonese team AS Stade Mandji of the Gabon Championnat National D1. The stadium has capacity to 7,000 people.
