= 2010 Central African Republic League =

Central African Republic League
- Champions: Olympic Real de Bangui
- Relegated: Esperance FC du 5eme Arrondissement

The 2010 Central African Republic League was the top division football competition in the Central African Republic in 2010.

== League table ==
| Pos | Team | Pld | W | D | L | GF | GA | GD | Pts | Qualification or relegation |
|---|---|---|---|---|---|---|---|---|---|---|
| 1 | Olympic Real de Bangui | 22 | 18 | 3 | 1 | 50 | 8 | +42 | 57 | Champions |
| 2 | SCAF Tocages | 22 | 13 | 7 | 2 | 44 | 18 | +26 | 46 | |
| 3 | AS Tempête Mocaf | 22 | 13 | 4 | 5 | 39 | 13 | +26 | 43 | |
| 4 | DFC 8ème Arrondissement | 22 | 13 | 3 | 6 | 39 | 18 | +21 | 42 | |
| 5 | Anges de Fatima | 22 | 10 | 3 | 9 | 38 | 31 | +7 | 33 | |
| 6 | Kpèténè Star | 22 | 8 | 3 | 11 | 42 | 40 | +2 | 27 | |
| 7 | TP USCA Bangui | 22 | 7 | 6 | 9 | 35 | 38 | −3 | 27 | |
| 8 | Anégrée Freese | 22 | 7 | 6 | 9 | 28 | 34 | −6 | 27 | |
| 9 | Sica Sport | 22 | 6 | 6 | 10 | 28 | 45 | −17 | 24 | |
| 10 | Espérance FC du 5ème Arrondissement | 22 | 5 | 8 | 9 | 29 | 32 | −3 | 23 | Relegation to lower division |
| 11 | Castel Foot | 22 | 5 | 2 | 15 | 15 | 47 | −32 | 17 | |
| 12 | Asset de Gobongo | 22 | 0 | 3 | 19 | 13 | 76 | −63 | 3 | Relegation to lower division |

Updated to match(es) played on 5 January 2019. Source:
