= List of football clubs in the Central African Republic =

For a complete list see Category:Football clubs in the Central African Republic

== A ==
- Anges de Fatima
- Asset Gobongo
- Association Sportive des Commerçants
- AS Kpéténé Star
- AS Tempête Mocaf

== C ==
- Castel Foot

== D ==
- DFC 8ème Arrondissement

== E ==
- Espérance FC du 5ème Arrondissement

== O ==
- Olympic Real de Bangui

== S ==
- SCAF Tocages
- Sporting Club de Bangui
- Stade Centrafricain

== U ==
- TP USCA Bangui
