= 2021 U-20 Africa Cup of Nations squads =

The 2021 Africa U-20 Cup of Nations is an international association football tournament held in Mauritania. The twelve national teams involved in the tournament were required to register a squad of 31 players; only players in these squads are eligible to take part in the tournament. Each player had to have been born after 1 January 2001. All ages as of start of the tournament. The squads for the 2021 Africa U-20 Cup of Nations were announced on 15 February 2021.

== Group A ==
=== Cameroon ===
Head coach: Ousmanou Christophe

No.	Pos.	Player	Date of birth (age)	Club
1	GK	Junior Hécube	10 December 2003 (aged 17)	(Cameroonian Football Federation) APEJES
2	DF	Blondon Meyapya	10 February 2001 (aged 20)	(Cameroonian Football Federation) Fauve Azur
3	DF	Saidou Ibrahim	4 June 2001 (aged 19)	(Cameroonian Football Federation) Fauve Azur
4	DF	Enzo Tchato	23 November 2002 (aged 18)	(French Football Federation) Montpellier
5	DF	Samuel Kotto	3 September 2003 (aged 17)	(Cameroonian Football Federation) APEJES
6	MF	Fidel Ambina	17 November 2001 (aged 19)	(Cameroonian Football Federation) Renaissance
7	FW	Saidou Alioum	25 July 2003 (aged 17)	(Cameroonian Football Federation) Sahel FC
8	MF	Stephan Ikpeme	1 April 2001 (aged 19)	(Cameroonian Football Federation) Djiko FC
9	FW	Kevin-Prince Milla	25 December 2003 (aged 17)	(Cameroonian Football Federation) Renaissance
10	FW	Etienne Eto'o	18 August 2002 (aged 18)	(Royal Spanish Football Federation) Real Oviedo
11	FW	Bemol Apam	15 June 2001 (aged 19)	(Cameroonian Football Federation) APEJES Academy
12	MF	Yannick Kamdoum	2 October 2001 (aged 19)	(Cameroonian Football Federation) Fondation Tafi
13	MF	Abdoulaye Yahaya	7 October 2001 (aged 19)	(Croatian Football Federation) Lokomotiva Zagreb
14	DF	Joseph Atangana	26 February 2003 (aged 17)	(French Football Federation) Stade de Reims
15	MF	Daouda Amadou	2 October 2002 (aged 18)	(Cameroonian Football Federation) Oyili FC
16	GK	Mamoudou Ahmada Saliou	10 December 2002 (aged 18)	(Cameroonian Football Federation) Coton Sport
17	MF	Yong Nchindo	26 February 2002 (aged 18)	(Cameroonian Football Federation) PWD Bamenda
18	MF	Felix Kekoh	2 March 2001 (aged 19)	(Austrian Football Association) Admira Wacker Mödling
19	FW	Junior Sunday	25 October 2002 (aged 18)	(Cameroonian Football Federation) Eding Sport
20	DF	Yvan Dibango	10 March 2002 (aged 18)	(Cameroonian Football Federation) Dragon Club
21	GK	Wilfried Bedfian	9 July 2001 (aged 19)	(French Football Federation) Châteauroux
22	DF	Bryan Nokoue	23 May 2002 (aged 18)	(French Football Federation) Saint-Étienne
23	MF	Yanike Tenkou	10 October 2002 (aged 18)	(Cameroonian Football Federation) RC Bafoussam
24	FW	Godefroy Toube	23 February 2001 (aged 19)	(Cameroonian Football Federation) AS Ngangue
25	DF	Goni Ali	22 September 2001 (aged 19)	(Cameroonian Football Federation) Coton Sport
26	MF	Marc Atangana	21 May 2001 (aged 19)	(Cameroonian Football Federation) Fauve Azur
27	FW	Eric Embe	14 April 2002 (aged 18)	(Turkish Football Federation) Adanaspor

=== Mauritania ===
No.	Pos.	Player	Date of birth (age)	Club
1	GK	Mohamed El Mokhtar	10 October 2002 (aged 18)	(Football Federation of the Islamic Republic of Mauritania) Académie FFRIM
2	MF	Oumar Boushab	20 June 2004 (aged 16)	(Football Federation of the Islamic Republic of Mauritania) ASC Police
3	DF	Mohamed Sarr	28 October 2002 (aged 18)	(Football Federation of the Islamic Republic of Mauritania) Nouakchott Kings
4	DF	Issa Konaté	31 December 2001 (aged 19)	(Football Federation of the Islamic Republic of Mauritania) ASAC Concorde
5	MF	Abdallahi Camara	15 February 2001 (aged 19)	(Football Federation of the Islamic Republic of Mauritania) ASAC Concorde
6	MF	Mohamed El Abd Sidi Ahmed	5 May 2001 (aged 19)	(Football Federation of the Islamic Republic of Mauritania) Nouakchott Kings
7	FW	Youssouf War	15 June 2003 (aged 17)	(Football Federation of the Islamic Republic of Mauritania) ASC Police
8	FW	El Mami Tetah	12 November 2001 (aged 19)	(Turkish Football Federation) Alanyaspor
9	FW	Abderrahmane Chigaly	21 April 2001 (aged 19)	(Football Federation of the Islamic Republic of Mauritania) FC Nouadhibou
10	MF	Oumar M'Bareck	15 May 2002 (aged 18)	(Football Federation of the Islamic Republic of Mauritania) ASAC Concorde
11	FW	Moulaye Mhamed Moulaye Idriss	15 August 2001 (aged 19)	(Football Federation of the Islamic Republic of Mauritania) Nouakchott Kings
12	DF	Mohamed Diop	28 February 2001 (aged 19)	(Football Federation of the Islamic Republic of Mauritania) Nouakchott Kings
13	DF	Cheikh Bay Ramdhane	24 May 2001 (aged 19)	(Football Federation of the Islamic Republic of Mauritania) Nouakchott Kings
14	DF	Mohamed Lemine Hawbott	6 January 2002 (aged 19)	(Football Federation of the Islamic Republic of Mauritania) Nouakchott Kings
15	DF	Bilal Elmokhtar	15 April 2001 (aged 19)	(Football Federation of the Islamic Republic of Mauritania) FC Nouadhibou
16	GK	Abou Diallo	3 September 2001 (aged 19)	(Football Federation of the Islamic Republic of Mauritania) Nouakchott Kings
17	MF	Adama Diop	7 February 2002 (aged 18)	(French Football Federation) SO Cholet
18	MF	Yacoub El Id	14 May 2001 (aged 19)	(Football Federation of the Islamic Republic of Mauritania) Académie FFRIM
19	MF	Yacoub Saghanogho	22 July 2001 (aged 19)	(Football Federation of the Islamic Republic of Mauritania) FC Tevragh-Zeina
20	FW	Samba Diop	21 October 2003 (aged 17)	(Senegalese Football Federation) Génération Foot
21	MF	Ely Housseine Sy	20 May 2003 (aged 17)	(Football Federation of the Islamic Republic of Mauritania) ASAC Concorde
22	GK	Sidi Heiba Moulaye Zeine	14 April 2001 (aged 19)	(Football Federation of the Islamic Republic of Mauritania) Nouakchott Kings
23	FW	Silly Sanghare	24 February 2001 (aged 19)	(French Football Federation) Chamois Niortais F.C.
24	DF	Demba Yatera	8 June 2002 (aged 18)	(French Football Federation) Clermont Foot
25	FW	Souleymane Kamara	10 January 2002 (aged 19)	(French Football Federation) Chamois Niortais F.C.
26	DF	Abou Oumar Diallo	28 February 2002 (aged 18)	(French Football Federation) US Quevilly-Rouen
27	FW	Alassane Diop	24 June 2001 (aged 19)	(Football Federation of the Islamic Republic of Mauritania) ASAC Concorde
28	DF	Mohamed Ramdane Zweide	25 May 2001 (aged 19)	(Football Federation of the Islamic Republic of Mauritania) Nouakchott Kings
29	MF	Amar Haïdara	28 November 2003 (aged 17)	(Senegalese Football Federation) Diambars FC

=== Mozambique ===
No.	Pos.	Player	Date of birth (age)	Club
3	DF	Belarmino Manhice	5 January 2001 (aged 20)	(Mozambican Football Federation) Maxaquene
4	DF	Aylton Zerefos	24 April 2003 (aged 17)	(Mozambican Football Federation) Associação Black Bulls
5	DF	Cleyd Petrosse	14 February 2003 (aged 18)	(Mozambican Football Federation) Associação Black Bulls
6	MF	Cardoso Novela	3 December 2001 (aged 19)	(Mozambican Football Federation) Ferroviário de Maputo
7	FW	Pablo Bechardas	17 May 2002 (aged 18)	(Portuguese Football Federation) CD Nacional
8	MF	Zé Zavala	14 October 2003 (aged 17)	(Mozambican Football Federation) Associação Black Bulls
9	FW	Simon Cipriano	3 August 2003 (aged 17)	(Mozambican Football Federation) Associação Black Bulls
10	FW	Valdimiro Paulino	25 May 2002 (aged 18)	(Mozambican Football Federation) Associação Black Bulls
11	FW	Gianluca Lorenzoni	22 February 2001 (aged 19)	(Portuguese Football Federation) Varzim
12	GK	Kimiss Zavala	8 May 2004 (aged 16)	(Mozambican Football Federation) Associação Black Bulls
13	GK	Dias Sebastião Fumo	1 March 2002 (aged 18)	(Mozambican Football Federation) Maxaquene
14	MF	Eduardo Andrassone	20 July 2001 (aged 19)	(Mozambican Football Federation) Ferroviário da Beira
16	FW	Miguel Muchanga	18 March 2003 (aged 17)	(Mozambican Football Federation) Associação Black Bulls
17	MF	Dercio Meque Augusto	14 March 2002 (aged 18)	(Mozambican Football Federation) Associação Black Bulls
18	MF	Celton Jenito Jamisse	23 January 2002 (aged 19)	(Mozambican Football Federation) Associação Black Bulls
19	DF	Rene Tembe	6 September 2001 (aged 19)	(Mozambican Football Federation) Associação Black Bulls
20	MF	Jossias Dlhakama	2 September 2001 (aged 19)	(Mozambican Football Federation) Desportivo de Maputo
22	GK	Simone Emilio Lipanga	10 December 2002 (aged 18)	(Mozambican Football Federation) Chingale de Tete
23	FW	Ivan Mario	26 January 2001 (aged 20)	(Mozambican Football Federation) ASC Nampula
24	GK	Joao Fasistencio	9 June 2003 (aged 17)	(Mozambican Football Federation) Ferroviário de Nampula
25	DF	Osama Eduaro Pedro	18 August 2002 (aged 18)	(Mozambican Football Federation) Costa do Sol
26	DF	Alberto Armando Alface	15 April 2001 (aged 19)	(Mozambican Football Federation) Ferroviário da Beira
27	FW	Gabriel Pinho	17 May 2002 (aged 18)	(Portuguese Football Federation) Sertanense
31	MF	Keyns Abdala	15 March 2003 (aged 17)	(Mozambican Football Federation) Costa do Sol

=== Uganda ===
Head coach: Morley Byekwaso

No.	Pos.	Player	Date of birth (age)	Club
1	GK	Denis Ssenyondwa	13 April 2003 (aged 17)	(Federation of Uganda Football Associations) SC Villa
2	DF	James Begisa	27 September 2002 (aged 18)	(Federation of Uganda Football Associations) UPDF FC
3	DF	Aziz Kayondo	6 October 2002 (aged 18)	(Federation of Uganda Football Associations) Vipers SC
4	DF	Ramathan Musa	13 November 2001 (aged 19)	(Federation of Uganda Football Associations) KCCA
5	DF	Gavin Kizito	14 January 2002 (aged 19)	(Federation of Uganda Football Associations) SC Villa
6	DF	Kenneth Semakula	4 November 2002 (aged 18)	(Federation of Uganda Football Associations) Bul FC
7	FW	Joseph Bukenya	8 August 2002 (aged 18)	(Federation of Uganda Football Associations) KCCA
8	MF	Steven Sserwadda	28 August 2002 (aged 18)	(Federation of Uganda Football Associations) KCCA
9	FW	Ivan Bogere	14 June 2002 (aged 18)	(Federation of Uganda Football Associations) Proline
10	MF	Isma Mugulusi	10 October 2003 (aged 17)	(Federation of Uganda Football Associations) Busoga United
11	MF	Ivan Asaba	8 May 2003 (aged 17)	(Federation of Uganda Football Associations) Vipers SC
12	MF	Andrew Kawooya	3 March 2003 (aged 17)	(Federation of Uganda Football Associations) KCCA
13	DF	Joseph Kafumbe	9 October 2002 (aged 18)	(Federation of Uganda Football Associations) KCCA
14	MF	Najib Yiga	18 December 2002 (aged 18)	(Federation of Uganda Football Associations) Vipers SC
15	FW	Richard Basangwa	17 December 2001 (aged 19)	(Federation of Uganda Football Associations) Vipers SC
16	MF	Davis Ssekajja	25 February 2002 (aged 18)	(Federation of Uganda Football Associations) Bright Stars FC
17	MF	Bobosi Byaruhanga	3 December 2001 (aged 19)	(Federation of Uganda Football Associations) Vipers SC
18	GK	Jack Komakech	31 July 2002 (aged 18)	(South African Football Association) Ascent SA
19	GK	Delton Oyo	24 November 2003 (aged 17)	(Federation of Uganda Football Associations) Busoga United
20	FW	Derrick Kakooza	23 October 2002 (aged 18)	(Federation of Uganda Football Associations) Police FC
21	FW	Samuel Ssenyonjo	3 September 2001 (aged 19)	(Federation of Uganda Football Associations) KCCA
22	DF	Simon Baligeya	17 July 2001 (aged 19)	(Federation of Uganda Football Associations) Kibuli SS
23	MF	Ivan Eyamu	18 June 2001 (aged 19)	(Federation of Uganda Football Associations) Mbarara City
24	MF	Faisal Wabyoona	22 June 2003 (aged 17)	(Federation of Uganda Football Associations) Big Talent SA
25	FW	Alpha Thierry Ssali	29 December 2003 (aged 17)	(Federation of Uganda Football Associations) Proline

== Group B ==
=== Burkina Faso ===
No.	Pos.	Player	Date of birth (age)	Club
1	GK	Sidi Diawara	18 March 2001 (aged 19)	(Burkinabé Football Federation) AS Douanes
2	DF	Gaoussou Sanou	24 June 2001 (aged 19)	(Burkinabé Football Federation) Royal
3	DF	Eric Chardey	6 August 2003 (aged 17)	(Burkinabé Football Federation) Majestic
4	DF	Yashir Moustapha Ouedraogo	31 December 2001 (aged 19)	(Burkinabé Football Federation) ASFA
5	DF	Yacouba Nasser	15 November 2002 (aged 18)	(Burkinabé Football Federation) Vitesse
6	MF	Roland Sanou	10 May 2002 (aged 18)	(Burkinabé Football Federation) Royal
7	FW	Kouamé Botué	7 August 2002 (aged 18)	(Burkinabé Football Federation) USFA
8	MF	Yael Tiendrebeogo	25 April 2001 (aged 19)	(Romanian Football Federation) Gaz Metan Târgu Mureș
9	FW	Alassane Zeba	24 July 2003 (aged 17)	(Burkinabé Football Federation) Academie Football Tenakourou
10	MF	Ibrahim Bancé	15 January 2001 (aged 20)	(Ivorian Football Federation) ASEC Mimosas
11	FW	Pierre Landry Kabore	5 July 2001 (aged 19)	(Burkinabé Football Federation) Salitas
12	MF	Faad Sana	15 April 2003 (aged 17)	(Ghana Football Association) WAFA
13	FW	Nathanio Kompaoré	20 June 2001 (aged 19)	(Royal Belgian Football Association) Anderlecht
14	MF	Clovis Ouedraogo	24 July 2002 (aged 18)	(Burkinabé Football Federation) ÉF Ouagadougou
15	MF	Drissa Banao	17 September 2001 (aged 19)	(Burkinabé Football Federation) KOZAF
16	GK	Ladji Sanou	21 April 2003 (aged 17)	(Burkinabé Football Federation) Salitas
17	MF	Blakiss Ouattara	16 December 2001 (aged 19)	(Burkinabé Football Federation) RC Bobo Dioulasso
18	MF	Ousmane Diane	14 February 2001 (aged 20)	(Burkinabé Football Federation) ASFA
19	FW	Urbain Convolbo	2 November 2002 (aged 18)	(Burkinabé Football Federation) AS Douanes
20	MF	Raouf Memel Dao	5 September 2003 (aged 17)	(Burkinabé Football Federation) US Ouagadougou
21	FW	Joffrey Bazié	27 October 2003 (aged 17)	(Burkinabé Football Federation) Salitas
22	DF	Karamoko Bamba	2 December 2003 (aged 17)	(Burkinabé Football Federation) RC Bobo Dioulasso
23	GK	Sebastien Koula Tou	1 December 2004 (aged 16)	(French Football Federation) Football Broug
24	MF	Aboubacar Belem	24 January 2002 (aged 19)	(Burkinabé Football Federation) Majestic
25	DF	Mohamed Congo	8 October 2003 (aged 17)	(Burkinabé Football Federation) Majestic
26	MF	Noufou Zagre	9 March 2004 (aged 16)	(Burkinabé Football Federation) ASF Bobo Dioulasso
27	FW	Moubarack Compaore	24 September 2002 (aged 18)	(Senegalese Football Federation) Oslo Football Académie de Dakar
28	FW	Daouda Beleme	5 January 2001 (aged 20)	(German Football Association) St. Pauli
29	DF	Gilbert Bilgo	2 May 2001 (aged 19)	(Burkinabé Football Federation) US Ouagadougou
30	GK	Moussa Traore	2 January 2001 (aged 20)	(Burkinabé Football Federation) Rahimo
31	DF	Brahima Dao	12 April 2003 (aged 17)	(Burkinabé Football Federation) Rahimo

=== Central African Republic ===
No.	Pos.	Player	Date of birth (age)	Club
1	GK	Thérance Zengba	6 February 2002 (aged 19)	(Central African Football Federation) ASOPT
2	FW	Toussaint Gombe-Fei	1 November 2001 (aged 19)	(Central African Football Federation) Red Star
3	DF	Flory Yangao	13 January 2002 (aged 19)	(Central African Football Federation) Olympic Real
4	MF	Lionel Sangha	23 May 2002 (aged 18)	(Central African Football Federation) SCAF Tocages
5	DF	Landry Biako	7 October 2002 (aged 18)	(Central African Football Federation) ASOPT
6	DF	Hergy Gaïs Pounaba	3 December 2002 (aged 18)	(Central African Football Federation) DFC 8ème Arrondissement
7	FW	Isaac Ngoma	9 December 2002 (aged 18)	(Central African Football Federation) JSB
8	MF	Rovias Danboy	19 January 2003 (aged 18)	(Central African Football Federation) Castel Foot
9	FW	Henoc Kpeko	11 December 2002 (aged 18)	(Central African Football Federation) Olympic Real
10	MF	Dylan Kinima	11 June 2001 (aged 19)	(French Football Federation) Toulouse
11	FW	Moustapha Djimet	12 June 2003 (aged 17)	(Central African Football Federation) Red Star
12	DF	Marc Yapéndé	20 August 2002 (aged 18)	(Central African Football Federation) Olympic Real
13	MF	Soleil Mongolobao	20 June 2001 (aged 19)	(Central African Football Federation) Olympic Real
14	FW	Hamissou Dangabo	15 January 2003 (aged 18)	(French Football Federation) EA Guingamp
15	FW	Christian Yawanendji	16 May 2002 (aged 18)	(Central African Football Federation) SCAF Tocages
16	GK	Emmanuel Takolingba	24 October 2001 (aged 19)	(Central African Football Federation) EC Begoua
17	MF	Ignace Bendima	20 October 2001 (aged 19)	(Central African Football Federation) AS Gbangre
18	MF	Aimé Fioguende	31 December 2002 (aged 18)	(Central African Football Federation) AS Tempête Mocaf
19	MF	Angelo Galabazi	25 September 2003 (aged 17)	(Central African Football Federation) DFC 8ème Arrondissement
20	DF	Christin Banam	1 May 2003 (aged 17)	(Central African Football Federation) Les Anges de Fatima
21	MF	Fanuel Koyakogue	28 November 2003 (aged 17)	(Central African Football Federation) SCAF Tocages
22	GK	Mauril Abimala	7 January 2004 (aged 17)	(Central African Football Federation) Olympic Real
23	FW	Juvenal Malipangou	1 August 2002 (aged 18)	(Central African Football Federation) SCAF Tocages
24	FW	Christ-Wesley Djonkou	17 August 2002 (aged 18)	(Royal Moroccan Football Federation) Al Amjad Lissasfa
25	FW	Dieff Ngandji	2 July 2002 (aged 18)	(Central African Football Federation) AS Gbangre
26	FW	Soudi Amadou	3 May 2003 (aged 17)	(Turkish Football Federation) Adana Demirspor
27	FW	Sawan Chevallier	11 January 2002 (aged 19)	(French Football Federation) SO Cholet
28	FW	Chadrack Djendo	15 December 2003 (aged 17)	(Central African Football Federation) DFC 8ème Arrondissement

=== Namibia ===
Head coach: James Britz

No.	Pos.	Player	Date of birth (age)	Club
1	GK	Ruhuka Ngatangue	2 December 2001 (aged 19)	(Namibia Football Association) Karibib
2	DF	Ngazikue Kandetu	20 June 2001 (aged 19)	(Namibia Football Association) Namib Eagles
3	DF	Baggio Nashixwa	23 May 2002 (aged 18)	(Namibia Football Association) Ramblers
4	DF	Immanuel Hamunyela	19 December 2001 (aged 19)	(Namibia Football Association) Swallows
5	MF	Denzel Narib	16 January 2002 (aged 19)	(Namibia Football Association) Swallows
6	DF	Tuhafeni David	5 February 2001 (aged 20)	(Namibia Football Association) Blue Waters
7	MF	Juninho Jantze	17 December 2001 (aged 19)	(Namibia Football Association) Civics Windhoek
8	MF	Jovane Narib	27 September 2001 (aged 19)	(Namibia Football Association) Otjiwarongo
9	MF	Giovani Kaninab	16 April 2001 (aged 19)	(Namibia Football Association) Okahandja United
10	MF	Prins Tjiueza	12 March 2002 (aged 18)	(Namibia Football Association) Young United
11	MF	Steven Damaseb	11 October 2002 (aged 18)	(Namibia Football Association) Tutaleni
12	FW	Ronin Berndt	28 January 2002 (aged 19)	(Namibia Football Association) Kaizen
13	MF	Xavier McClune	6 August 2003 (aged 17)	(Namibia Football Association) Ramblers
14	MF	Edmar Kamatuka	26 July 2002 (aged 18)	(Namibia Football Association) Ramblers
15	DF	Promise Gurirab	22 September 2002 (aged 18)	(Namibia Football Association) Action Star
16	GK	Ro-Giano Goagoseb	21 March 2001 (aged 19)	(Namibia Football Association) Swallows
17	MF	Amazing Kandjii	27 May 2002 (aged 18)	(Namibia Football Association) Namib Colts
18	MF	Carl Karuuombe	21 September 2001 (aged 19)	(Namibia Football Association) Kaizen
19	MF	Pitsi Ameb	28 November 2001 (aged 19)	(Namibia Football Association) Swallows
20	MF	Romeo Amon	5 June 2003 (aged 17)	(Namibia Football Association) Kaizen
21	MF	Gonzales Tsuseb	7 January 2002 (aged 19)	(Namibia Football Association) Outjo
22	MF	Eubrahim Apollus	28 August 2002 (aged 18)	(Namibia Football Association) Try Again
23	GK	Philipus Josef	5 November 2001 (aged 19)	(Namibia Football Association) Life Fighters
24	DF	Gerson Paulus	10 December 2001 (aged 19)	(Namibia Football Association) Swakopmund
25	DF	Ngero Katua	25 July 2001 (aged 19)	(Namibia Football Association) Kaizen
26	DF	Erastus Joseph	14 March 2003 (aged 17)	(Namibia Football Association) Ongwediva City
27	DF	Garere Damaseb	12 March 2003 (aged 17)	(Namibia Football Association) Chelea
28	DF	Matheus Mwanyekange	13 July 2002 (aged 18)	(Namibia Football Association) Haudano Secondary School
29	MF	Herman Uwuseb	13 April 2003 (aged 17)	(Namibia Football Association) Speed Fire

=== Tunisia ===
Head coach: Maher Kanzari

No.	Pos.	Player	Date of birth (age)	Club
1	GK	Elias Damergy	17 October 2002 (aged 18)	(French Football Federation) Stade Rennais
2	DF	Ramzi Ferjani	11 April 2001 (aged 19)	(Slovak Football Association) FC Nitra
3	DF	Amine Cherni	7 July 2001 (aged 19)	(French Football Federation) Paris
4	DF	Rayene Haddad	1 February 2003 (aged 18)	(Tunisian Football Federation) CS Hammam-Lif
5	DF	Adam Ben Lamin	2 June 2001 (aged 19)	(Swedish Football Association) AIK
6	MF	Fares Neji	19 May 2001 (aged 19)	(Tunisian Football Federation) CS Sfaxien
7	FW	Hamdi Labidi	9 June 2002 (aged 18)	(Tunisian Football Federation) Club Africain
8	MF	Mootez Zaddem	5 January 2001 (aged 20)	(Latvian Football Federation) Valmiera
9	FW	Mouhib Selmi	15 January 2003 (aged 18)	(Tunisian Football Federation) Espérance Sportive de Tunis
10	FW	Zied Berrima	9 April 2001 (aged 19)	(Tunisian Football Federation) Espérance Sportive de Tunis
11	FW	Farouk Mimouni	13 June 2001 (aged 19)	(Tunisian Football Federation) Espérance Sportive de Tunis
12	DF	Aziz Gasmi	26 June 2001 (aged 19)	(Tunisian Football Federation) Club Africain
13	DF	Abdallah Amri	6 September 2001 (aged 19)	(Tunisian Football Federation) CS Sfaxien
14	DF	Marc Lamti	28 January 2001 (aged 20)	(German Football Association) Hannover 96
15	MF	Chiheb Labidi	1 June 2001 (aged 19)	(Tunisian Football Federation) Club Africain
16	GK	Ahmed Laabidi	20 August 2001 (aged 19)	(Tunisian Football Federation) Club Africain
17	DF	Amine Zghada	7 July 2001 (aged 19)	(Tunisian Football Federation) Club Africain
18	FW	Hassan Ayari	8 December 2002 (aged 18)	(The Football Association) Sheffield United
19	FW	Nabil Makni	29 September 2001 (aged 19)	(Italian Football Federation) Hellas Verona
20	DF	Chawki Ben Khader	8 February 2001 (aged 20)	(Tunisian Football Federation) USBG
21	MF	Mohamed Ajimi	7 March 2002 (aged 18)	(Tunisian Football Federation) Club Africain
22	GK	Oussama Hanzouli	28 January 2001 (aged 20)	(Tunisian Football Federation) Club Africain
23	FW	Habessi Achref	8 December 2001 (aged 19)	(Tunisian Football Federation) CS Sfaxien
24	MF	Houssem Kar	26 April 2001 (aged 19)	(Tunisian Football Federation) OS Kebili
25	DF	Mohamed Karoui	18 February 2002 (aged 18)	(Tunisian Football Federation) AS Marsa
26	FW	Youssef Snana	24 March 2004 (aged 16)	(Tunisian Football Federation) Club Africain
27	DF	Fradj Ben Njima	23 January 2004 (aged 17)	(Tunisian Football Federation) Étoile Sportive du Sahel
28	MF	Wassim Sioud	31 May 2001 (aged 19)	(Tunisian Football Federation) AS Rejiche
29	MF	Ghassen Khelfa	9 August 2002 (aged 18)	(Tunisian Football Federation) US Tataouine
30	GK	Ahmed Slimene	30 November 2002 (aged 18)	(Tunisian Football Federation) Étoile Sportive du Sahel
31	FW	Anis Ben Slimane	16 March 2001 (aged 19)	(Danish Football Association) Brøndby

== Group C ==
=== Gambia ===
Head coach: Mattar M'Boge

No.	Pos.	Player	Date of birth (age)	Club
1	GK	Lamin Saidy	17 June 2001 (aged 19)	(Gambia Football Federation) Real de Banjul
2	MF	Ba Lamin Sowe	1 December 2003 (aged 17)	(Gambia Football Federation) Waa Banjul
3	DF	Fredina Jatta	3 October 2002 (aged 18)	(Senegalese Football Federation) Academy Diaguéne
4	MF	Adama Kanteh	24 April 2001 (aged 19)	(Gambia Football Federation) Latrikunda United
5	DF	Lamin Jawara	12 February 2002 (aged 19)	(Gambia Football Federation) Hawks
6	MF	Baba Ceesay	4 February 2002 (aged 19)	(Gambia Football Federation) Banjul United
7	DF	Habibou Mendy	7 February 2001 (aged 20)	(Gambia Football Federation) Brikama United
8	MF	Tijan Muhammed Marr	26 December 2001 (aged 19)	(Gambia Football Federation) Fortune
9	FW	Modou Bojang	19 June 2001 (aged 19)	(Gambia Football Federation) Brikama United
10	FW	Kajally Drammeh	10 October 2003 (aged 17)	(Gambia Football Federation) Real de Banjul
11	FW	Alieu Barry	26 October 2002 (aged 18)	(Gambia Football Federation) Elite United
12	DF	Modou Manneh	13 February 2001 (aged 20)	(Gambia Football Federation) Real de Banjul
13	DF	Alagie Saine	20 January 2003 (aged 18)	(Gambia Football Federation) Falcons
14	MF	Lamarana Jallow	21 March 2002 (aged 18)	(Gambia Football Federation) Elite United
15	MF	Momodou Salieu Jallow	9 January 2004 (aged 17)	(Gambia Football Federation) Waa Banjul
16	DF	Bakary Jawara	2 April 2003 (aged 17)	(Gambia Football Federation) Fortune
17	MF	Alagie Kujabi	22 July 2002 (aged 18)	(Gambia Football Federation) Team Rhino
18	GK	Pa Ebou Dampha	29 March 2003 (aged 17)	(Gambia Football Federation) Waa Banjul
19	FW	Alagie Gibba	4 November 2002 (aged 18)	(Gambia Football Federation) Wallidan
20	FW	Wally Fofana	4 May 2002 (aged 18)	(Gambia Football Federation) BK Milan
21	DF	Ebou Camara	20 September 2002 (aged 18)	(Gambia Football Federation) Hawks
22	GK	Alagie Saho	14 February 2002 (aged 19)	(Gambia Football Federation) BK Milan
23	MF	Mass Njie	11 November 2002 (aged 18)	(Gambia Football Federation) Hawks
24	MF	Momodou Talibeh Jallow	21 January 2003 (aged 18)	(The Football Association) Milton Keynes Dons
25	DF	Edrissa Ceesay	16 April 2001 (aged 19)	(Senegalese Football Federation) Cayor Foot
26	FW	Musa Juwara	26 December 2001 (aged 19)	(Italian Football Federation) Bologna
27	FW	Mustapha Jah	27 January 2004 (aged 17)	(Gambia Football Federation) Real de Banjul
28	MF	Ethan Bojang	1 September 2002 (aged 18)	(The Football Association) Doncaster Rovers
29	GK	Yankuba Sabally	26 December 2002 (aged 18)	(Gambia Football Federation) Fortune
30	FW	Muhammad Malick Lowe	14 December 2003 (aged 17)	(Royal Dutch Football Association) Volendam
31	GK	Serine Sanneh	20 November 2002 (aged 18)	(The Football Association) West Ham United

=== Ghana ===
Head coach: Abdul-Karim Zito

No.	Pos.	Player	Date of birth (age)	Club
1	GK	William Emmanuel Essu	9 May 2002 (aged 18)	(Ghana Football Association) Vision
2	DF	Philomon Baffour	6 February 2001 (aged 20)	(Ghana Football Association) Dreams
3	DF	Benjamin Aloma	30 November 2001 (aged 19)	(Ghana Football Association) Vision
4	DF	Nathaniel Adjei	21 August 2002 (aged 18)	(Ghana Football Association) Danbort
5	DF	Frank Assinki	15 April 2002 (aged 18)	(Danish Football Association) HB Køge
6	MF	Emmanuel Essiam	19 December 2003 (aged 17)	(Ghana Football Association) Berekum Chelsea
7	FW	Mathew Anim Cudjoe	11 November 2003 (aged 17)	(Ghana Football Association) Legon Cities
8	MF	Sampson Agyapong	1 September 2002 (aged 18)	(Ghana Football Association) WAFA
9	FW	Percious Boah	23 October 2002 (aged 18)	(Ghana Football Association) Dreams
10	FW	Daniel Afriyie	26 June 2001 (aged 19)	(Ghana Football Association) Accra Hearts of Oak
11	FW	Mohammed Sulemana	13 December 2002 (aged 18)	(Ghana Football Association) Dreams
12	GK	David Kudjo	24 July 2002 (aged 18)	(Ghana Football Association) Action Boys
13	MF	Patrick Mensah	4 October 2001 (aged 19)	(Ghana Football Association) Heart of Lions
14	DF	Ivan Anokye Mensah	22 April 2004 (aged 16)	(Ghana Football Association) Žilina Africa
15	DF	McCarthy Ofori	3 May 2005 (aged 15)	(Ghana Football Association) Techiman Eleven Wonders
16	GK	Appiah Kubi	11 January 2001 (aged 20)	(Ghana Football Association) Accra Lions
17	MF	Eric Appiah	8 May 2001 (aged 19)	(Royal Belgian Football Association) Club Brugge
18	FW	Abdul Mugees Zakaria	27 December 2001 (aged 19)	(Ghana Football Association) Techiman Eleven Wonders
19	FW	Samuel Agbenyega	26 May 2003 (aged 17)	(Ghana Football Association) Heart of Lions
20	FW	Prince Kwabena Adu	23 September 2003 (aged 17)	(Ghana Football Association) Bechem United
21	GK	Ibrahim Danlad	2 December 2002 (aged 18)	(Ghana Football Association) Asante Kotoko
22	MF	Abdul Fatawu	8 March 2004 (aged 16)	(Ghana Football Association) Steadfast FC
23	DF	Samuel Abbey-Ashie Quaye	14 April 2001 (aged 19)	(Ghana Football Association) Accra Great Olympics
24	FW	Frank Boateng	16 November 2002 (aged 18)	(Ghana Football Association) Prestige
25	FW	Emmanuel Agyemang Duah	13 January 2003 (aged 18)	(Ghana Football Association) Ebony
26	DF	Uzair Alhassan	29 March 2002 (aged 18)	(Ghana Football Association) Tamale
27	DF	Joselpho Barnes	12 December 2001 (aged 19)	(German Football Association) Schalke 04
28	MF	David Acquah	4 April 2001 (aged 19)	(Israel Football Association) Maccabi Haifa
29	MF	Nana Kobina Osoh	15 September 2001 (aged 19)	(Ghana Football Association) Techiman Eleven Wonders
30	FW	James Ampofo	20 October 2003 (aged 17)	(Ghana Football Association) Semper Fi Academy

=== Morocco ===
No.	Pos.	Player	Date of birth (age)	Club
1	GK	Taha Mourid	4 March 2002 (aged 18)	(Royal Moroccan Football Federation) Wydad AC
2	DF	Omar El Hilali	12 September 2003 (aged 17)	(Royal Spanish Football Federation) Espanyol
3	DF	Mohamed Souboul	17 November 2001 (aged 19)	(Royal Moroccan Football Federation) Raja CA
4	DF	Youssef Aoujdal	2 January 2002 (aged 19)	(Royal Moroccan Football Federation) AMF
5	DF	Oussama Raoui	13 November 2002 (aged 18)	(Royal Moroccan Football Federation) Fath Union Sport
6	MF	El Mehdi Moubarik	22 January 2001 (aged 20)	(Royal Moroccan Football Federation) Fath Union Sport
7	FW	Haitam Abaida	1 June 2002 (aged 18)	(Royal Spanish Football Federation) Málaga
8	MF	Oussama Targhalline	20 May 2002 (aged 18)	(French Football Federation) Olympique de Marseille
9	FW	Ayoub Mouloua	30 September 2002 (aged 18)	(Royal Moroccan Football Federation) Fath Union Sport
10	FW	Mountassir Elhtemy	1 April 2001 (aged 19)	(Royal Moroccan Football Federation) Fath Union Sport
11	FW	Nabil Touaizi	1 February 2001 (aged 20)	(Royal Spanish Football Federation) Espanyol
12	GK	Alaa Bellaarouch	1 January 2002 (aged 19)	(French Football Federation) Strasbourg
13	MF	Aymane Ouhatti	15 January 2001 (aged 20)	(French Football Federation) Amiens
14	FW	El Mehdi Maouhoub	5 June 2003 (aged 17)	(Royal Moroccan Football Federation) Fath Union Sport
15	MF	Adil Tahif	24 February 2001 (aged 19)	(Royal Spanish Football Federation) Leganés
16	DF	Hamza Bousqal	24 March 2001 (aged 19)	(Royal Moroccan Football Federation) Union de Touarga
17	FW	Charaf-Eddine Boulahroud	21 February 2001 (aged 19)	(Royal Moroccan Football Federation) Olympic Dcheira
18	MF	Tawfik Bentayeb	14 January 2002 (aged 19)	(Royal Moroccan Football Federation) AMF
19	FW	Zacarias Ghailan	28 June 2002 (aged 18)	(Royal Spanish Football Federation) Barcelona
20	MF	Mohammed Amine Essahel	17 February 2003 (aged 17)	(Royal Moroccan Football Federation) AMF
21	MF	Marouane Ouhrou	8 February 2002 (aged 19)	(Royal Moroccan Football Federation) Ittihad Khemisset
22	GK	Ahmed Azmi	3 September 2002 (aged 18)	(Royal Dutch Football Association) FC Utrecht
23	MF	Hamza Darai	21 May 2001 (aged 19)	(Royal Moroccan Football Federation) DHJ
24	MF	Achraf Ramzi	4 February 2002 (aged 19)	(Royal Moroccan Football Federation) Fath Union Sport
25	MF	Oussama Zemraoui	1 March 2002 (aged 18)	(Royal Moroccan Football Federation) Chabab Mohammédia
26	MF	Taha Alachbili	8 June 2001 (aged 19)	(Royal Moroccan Football Federation) Raja CA
27	DF	Amine Ghazoini	9 January 2001 (aged 20)	(Italian Football Federation) Ascoli
28	MF	Fouad El Maach	2 January 2001 (aged 20)	(French Football Federation) AS Monaco
29	MF	Ilyas Chaira	2 February 2001 (aged 20)	(Royal Spanish Football Federation) Ibiza

=== Tanzania ===
No.	Pos.	Player	Date of birth (age)	Club
1	GK	Rahim Sheikh	15 April 2002 (aged 18)	(Tanzania Football Federation) Kinondoni Municipal Council
2	DF	Anderson Solomon	2 November 2002 (aged 18)	(Tanzania Football Federation) Dodoma
3	DF	David Kameta	12 December 2001 (aged 19)	(Tanzania Football Federation) Simba
4	MF	Khleffin Hamdoun	8 January 2001 (aged 20)	(Tanzania Football Federation) Azam
5	DF	Laurent Alfred	20 January 2002 (aged 19)	(Tanzania Football Federation) Azam
6	MF	Rajabu Hassani	28 February 2001 (aged 19)	(Tanzania Football Federation) Gwambina
7	FW	Ben Starkie	23 July 2002 (aged 18)	(German Football Association) Wilhelmshaven
8	MF	Hassan Kapalata	10 October 2002 (aged 18)	(Tanzania Football Federation) Kinondoni Municipal Council
9	MF	Abdul Sopu	26 February 2001 (aged 19)	(Tanzania Football Federation) Coastal Union
10	FW	Kelvin John	10 June 2003 (aged 17)	(Tanzania Football Federation) Brook House Academy
11	MF	Tepsi Evans	30 December 2002 (aged 18)	(Tanzania Football Federation) Ihefu
12	GK	Razack Ramadhani	16 July 2003 (aged 17)	(Tanzania Football Federation) Mtibwa Sugar
13	MF	Novatus Dismas	2 September 2002 (aged 18)	(Israel Football Association) Maccabi Tel Aviv
14	FW	Ibrahimshah Faisal	1 March 2002 (aged 18)	(Tanzania Football Federation) Dodoma
15	DF	Omary Jumanne	10 June 2002 (aged 18)	(Tanzania Football Federation) Mtibwa Sugar
16	MF	Nassor Saadun	23 March 2001 (aged 19)	(Tanzania Football Federation) MFK Czech
17	FW	Abubakar Salum	8 February 2001 (aged 20)	(Tanzania Football Federation) Mtibwa Sugar
18	GK	Zuberi Foba	23 May 2002 (aged 18)	(Tanzania Football Federation) Azam
19	MF	Kassim Shabani	25 December 2001 (aged 19)	(Tanzania Football Federation) Tanzania Polosi
20	DF	Abdulrazack Hamza	23 March 2003 (aged 17)	(Tanzania Football Federation) Mbeya City
21	DF	Samwel Onditi	13 September 2002 (aged 18)	(Tanzania Football Federation) Ihefu
22	DF	Pascal Gaudence	15 August 2003 (aged 17)	(Tanzania Football Federation) Azam
23	DF	David Brayson	12 March 2002 (aged 18)	(Tanzania Football Federation) Kinondoni Municipal Council
24	FW	Salim Zuberi	6 August 2002 (aged 18)	(Tanzania Football Federation) African Sports
25	MF	Ally Msengi	20 December 2001 (aged 19)	(South African Football Association) Stellenbosch
26	MF	Ashraf Malolo	29 December 2004 (aged 16)	(Tanzania Football Federation) Azam
27	DF	Alphonce Mabula	14 June 2003 (aged 17)	(Tanzania Football Federation) Tanzania Polosi
28	FW	Abdulsattasabri Caminero	11 October 2002 (aged 18)	
29	MF	Abdulkarim Yunus	21 November 2002 (aged 18)	
30	GK	Daniel Mgore	17 December 2002 (aged 18)	(Tanzania Football Federation) Biashara United
