= 2019 Central African Republic League =

Central African Republic League
- Season: 2019

The 2019 Central African Republic League season is the top level of football competition in Central African Republic.

== Teams ==
A total of eight teams participate in the Ligue de Bangui Division 1:

- Anges de Fatima
- AS Tempête Mocaf
- Castel Foot
- DFC8
- FCFDS
- Olympic Real de Bangui
- SCAF
- USCA

The champions are AS Tempête Mocaf.
