= 2018 Central African Republic League =

Central African Republic League
- Season: 2018

The 2018 Central African Republic League season is the top level of football competition in Central African Republic.

== Teams ==
A total of 12 teams participate in the Ligue de Bangui Première Division. The season started on 21 February 2018.

Halfway standings (18 June 2018):

Top two (30 September 2018):

1. Stade Centrafricaine
2. Anges de Fatima
