= Moussa Limane =

Central African Republic footballer

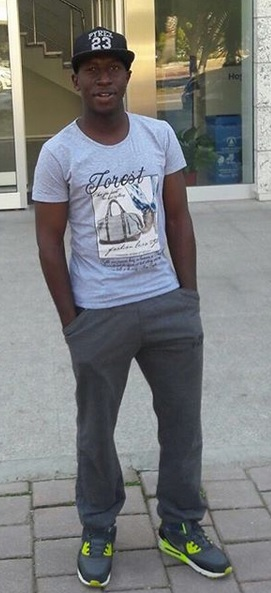
- Limane in Antalya in 2016

Personal information
- Date of birth: 7 May 1992 (age 34)
- Place of birth: Bangui, Central African Republic
- Height: 1.72 m (5 ft 8 in)
- Position: Striker

Team information
- Current team: Scarborough SC

Senior career*
Years	Team	Apps	(Gls)
2010–2011	DFC8		
2011	Al-Ahly Shendi		
2012	DFC8		
2013–2014	Al-Ahly Shendi		
2015	Kyzylzhar	22	(3)
2016–2018	Caspiy	41	(11)
2020–2022	Scarborough SC	12	(11)
2021	Coton Sport		
2023	Hamilton City		
2023–2024	Hamilton United	20	(3)
2025–	Scarborough SC		

International career^{‡}
2013–2017	Central African Republic	9	(2)
- * Club domestic league appearances and goals as of 1 September 2024 ‡ National team caps and goals as of 14:20, 22 January 2019 (UTC)

Moussa Limane (born 7 May 1992) is a Central African professional footballer who plays as a striker for Scarborough SC.

== Club career ==
=== Africa ===
Born in Bangui, Limane played in the Central African Republic League in 2010 with DFC8. Throughout his tenure with the Bangui-based team, he was the club's top goal scorer for two consecutive years between 2010 and 2011. Further silverware was added to DFC8's trophy cabinet by winning the Central African Republic Coupe Nationale in 2010 and the league title the following season. He played abroad in 2011 in the Sudan Premier League with Al-Ahly Shendi. In 2012, he returned to his former club DFC8, where he served as the team captain. During his second tenure with DFC, he played in the 2012 CAF Champions League against Les Astres FC. He returned to Shendi in 2013, where he would play for two seasons.

=== Kazakhstan ===
After several seasons in Africa, he began playing in Central Asia in the Kazakhstan First League with FC Kyzylzhar in 2015. He would sign with league rivals Caspiy the following season, where he played in 20 matches and recorded 4 goals. Limane was also a recipient of the Bamara Trophy in 2016. After the conclusion of the 2016 season, he had a trial run with FC Mulhouse but failed to secure a contract. As a result, he re-signed with Caspiy for the 2017 season. Throughout the season, he was named the player of the month in June 2017 and finished the campaign with seven goals.

=== Canada ===
In August 2020, he signed for the Canadian club Scarborough SC. In his debut season with Scarborough, he assisted in securing the league's first division title and finished as the league's top goalscorer. He also assisted the club in reaching the CSL Championship final against FC Vorkuta, but was defeated by a score of 2–1.

The following season, he assisted Scarborough in securing a postseason berth by finishing second in the standings. In the opening round of the playoffs, he contributed two goals against the Serbian White Eagles, which helped the club to advance to the championship final. He featured in the championship final against Vorkuta and registered two goals, which secured the title for Scarborough. He also helped Scarborough reach the final of the ProSound Cup but was defeated in a penalty shootout by Vorkuta.

He re-signed with Scarborough for the 2022 season. Throughout the 2022 campaign, the eastern Toronto side would achieve an 18-game undefeated streak and playoff position by finishing third. Limane made his third championship appearance, which Scarborough lost to FC Continentals (formerly FC Vorkuta).

In 2023, he signed with league rivals Hamilton City. He scored his first goal for the club on 3 June 2023, against Weston United. He then played with League1 Ontario club Hamilton United. Limane returned to play with Hamilton City for the 2024 season.

After a three-year absence, he returned to Scarborough SC in 2025, where he helped the club secure a league double.

== International career ==
He made his international debut for the Central African Republic on 8 June 2013, against South Africa in a 2014 FIFA World Cup qualification match. In the winter of 2013, he represented his country in the 2013 CEMAC Cup, a Non-FIFA tournament where he recorded a goal against Chad. He recorded his first international goal on 24 March 2016, against Madagascar in a 2017 Africa Cup of Nations qualification match. He would record his second international goal once more against Madagascar in the return match on 28 March 2016.

== Career statistics ==
=== International ===
As of match played 14 November 2017

Appearances and goals by national team and year
National team	Year	Apps	Goals
Central African Republic	2013	6	2
Central African Republic	2015	2	0
Central African Republic	2016	3	2
Central African Republic	2017	2	0
Total		13	4

Scores and results list Central African Republic's goal tally first, score column indicates score after each Limane goal.

List of international goals scored by Moussa Limane
No.	Date	Venue	Opponent	Score	Result	Competition	Ref.
1	13 December 2013	Stade Gaston Peyrille, Bitam, Gabon	Chad	1–0	1–0	2013 CEMAC Cup	
2	18 December 2013	Stade Gaston Peyrille, Bitam, Gabon	Cameroon	1–0	2–2	2013 CEMAC Cup	
3	24 March 2016	Rabemananjara Stadium, Mahajanga, Madagascar	Madagascar	1–1	1–1	2017 Africa Cup of Nations qualification	
4	28 March 2016	Barthélemy Boganda Stadium, Bangui, Central African Republic	Madagascar	2–1	2–1	2017 Africa Cup of Nations qualification	

== Honors ==
DFC 8ème Arrondissement

- Central African Republic League: 2010
- Central African Republic Coupe Nationale: 2010

Scarborough SC

- CSL Championship: 2021, 2025
- Canadian Soccer League First Division/Regular Season: 2020, 2025

Individual

- Canadian Soccer League Golden Boot: 2020
