= 2017 Africa Cup of Nations qualification Group B =

Football tournament qualification stage

Group B of the 2017 Africa Cup of Nations qualification tournament was one of the thirteen groups to decide the teams which qualified for the 2017 Africa Cup of Nations finals tournament. The group consisted of four teams: DR Congo, Angola, Central African Republic, and Madagascar.

The teams played against each other home-and-away in a round-robin format, between June 2015 and September 2016.

DR Congo, the group winners, qualified for the 2017 Africa Cup of Nations.

== Standings ==
Pos	Team	Pld	W	D	L	GF	GA	GD	Pts	Qualification	Democratic Republic of the Congo	Central African Republic	Angola	Madagascar
1	DR Congo	6	5	0	1	16	6	+10	15	Final tournament	—	4–1	2–1	2–1
2	Central African Republic	6	3	1	2	9	11	−2	10		2–0	—	3–1	2–1
3	Angola	6	1	2	3	7	8	−1	5		0–2	4–0	—	1–1
4	Madagascar	6	0	3	3	5	12	−7	3		1–6	1–1	0–0	—

Source: CAF
Rules for classification: Qualification tiebreakers

== Matches ==
13 June 2015
15:30 UTC+1

Angola	4–0	Central African Republic
Gelson 35', 63'; Dolly Menga 55' (pen.); Gilberto 89' (pen.)	Report

Estádio Nacional da Tundavala, Lubango
Referee: Duncan Lengani (Malawi)
14 June 2015
15:30 UTC+1

DR Congo	2–1	Madagascar
Mubele 58'; Kimwaki 73'	Report	Vombola 76'

Stade Tata Raphaël, Kinshasa
Referee: Beranger Woungui (Gabon)

6 September 2015
14:30 UTC+3

Madagascar	0–0	Angola
	Report

Mahamasina Municipal Stadium, Antananarivo
Referee: José Rachide (Mozambique)
6 September 2015
15:00 UTC+1

Central African Republic	2–0	DR Congo
Mabidé 24' (pen.); Gourrier 33'	Report

Barthélemy Boganda Stadium, Bangui
Referee: Antoine Effa (Cameroon)

24 March 2016
14:30 UTC+3

Madagascar	1–1	Central African Republic
Andriamatsinoro 80' (pen.)	Report	Limane 86'

Mahamasina Municipal Stadium, Antananarivo
Referee: Mbongseni Fakudze (Swaziland)
26 March 2016
15:30 UTC+1

DR Congo	2–1	Angola
Bakambu 23' (pen.); Meschak 78'	Report	Fredy 90+5' (pen.)

Stade des Martyrs, Kinshasa
Referee: Joseph Lamptey (Ghana)

28 March 2016
15:00 UTC+1

Central African Republic	2–1	Madagascar
Kéïta 52'; Limane 65'	Report	Andriatsima 35'

Barthélemy Boganda Stadium, Bangui
Referee: Ferdinand Udoh (Nigeria)
29 March 2016
17:00 UTC+1

Angola	0–2	DR Congo
	Report	Kimwaki 44'; Bolingi 89'

Estádio 11 de Novembro, Luanda
Referee: El Fadil Mohamed (Sudan)

5 June 2016
14:30 UTC+3

Madagascar	1–6	DR Congo
Rakotondraibe 86'	Report	Bakambu 2', 81'; M'Poku 21', 65'; Bolasie 41'; Botaka 90+1'

Rabemananjara Stadium, Mahajanga
Referee: Davies Omweno (Kenya)
5 June 2016
15:00 UTC+1

Central African Republic	3–1	Angola
Mabidé 15'; Yamissi 38'; Limane 77'	Report	Pana 86'

Barthélemy Boganda Stadium, Bangui
Referee: Yakhouba Keita (Guinea)

3 September 2016
16:00 UTC+1

Angola	1–1	Madagascar
Gelson 54'	Report	Razakanantenaina 17'

Estádio 11 de Novembro, Luanda
Referee: Janny Sikazwe (Zambia)
4 September 2016
18:30 UTC+1

DR Congo	4–1	Central African Republic
Kebano 29'; Mubele 46'; Bolingi 73'; Botaka 90+1'	Report	Kéthévoama 63'

Stade des Martyrs, Kinshasa
Referee: Bakary Gassama (Gambia)

== Goalscorers ==
3 goals

- (Angola) Gelson
- (Central African Republic) Moussa Limane
- (Democratic Republic of the Congo) Cédric Bakambu

2 goals

- (Central African Republic) Vianney Mabidé
- (Democratic Republic of the Congo) Jonathan Bolingi
- (Democratic Republic of the Congo) Jordan Botaka
- (Democratic Republic of the Congo) Joël Kimwaki
- (Democratic Republic of the Congo) Paul-José M'Poku
- (Democratic Republic of the Congo) Firmin Ndombe Mubele

1 goal

- (Angola) Fredy
- (Angola) Gilberto
- (Angola) Dolly Menga
- (Angola) Pana
- (Central African Republic) Junior Gourrier
- (Central African Republic) Salif Kéïta
- (Central African Republic) Foxi Kéthévoama
- (Central African Republic) Eloge Enza Yamissi
- (Democratic Republic of the Congo) Yannick Bolasie
- (Democratic Republic of the Congo) Neeskens Kebano
- (Democratic Republic of the Congo) Elia Meschak
- (Madagascar) Carolus Andriamatsinoro
- (Madagascar) Faneva Imà Andriatsima
- (Madagascar) Fabrice Angio Rakotondraibe
- (Madagascar) Pascal Razakanantenaina
- (Madagascar) Sarivahy Vombola
