= 2016 Central African Republic League =

Central African Republic League
- Season: 2016
- Champions: Olympic Real de Bangui

The 2016 Central African Republic League season is the top level of football competition in Central African Republic.

== Teams ==
A total of 12 teams participate in the Ligue de Bangui Première Division.
