= Gourrier =

Gourrier is a surname. Notable people with the surname include:

- Dana Gourrier, American actress
- John Fred Gourrier (1941–2005), American musician
- Junior Gourrier (born 1992), Central African footballer
- Pierre Gourrier (born 1947), French weightlifter

== See also ==
- Gourriel
