= Central African Republic Coupe Nationale =

The Coupe Nationale is the national knockout tournament for football clubs in the Central African Republic.

== Winners ==
- 1974 : AS Tempête Mocaf
- 1975
- 1976 : Red Star
- 1977 : Sodiam Sports
- 1978 : TP USCA Bangui
- 1979 : Sodiam Sports
- 1980 : Anges de Fatima
- 1981 : Anges de Fatima
- 1982 : AS Tempête Mocaf
- 1983 : Avia Sports
- 1984 : Stade Centrafricain (SCAF Tocages)
- 1985 : AS Tempête Mocaf
- 1986
- 1987
- 1988 : TP USCA Bangui
- 1989 : Réal Olympique Castel
- 1990 : FACA
- 1991 : Anges de Fatima 6–2 Anges Makaron
- 1992 : AS Tempête Mocaf 1–1 Anges de Fatima
- 1993 : Anges de Fatima 3–2 Stade Centrafricain
- 1994 : FACA
- 1995
- 1996
- 1997 : TP USCA Bangui 2–0 Anges de Fatima
- 1998 : Anges de Fatima 3–0 AS Petroca
- 1999 : Réal Olympique Castel
- 2000 : Anges de Fatima 2–1 Olympic Real
- 2001 : Stade Centrafricain 2–1 AS Tempête Mocaf
- 2002 : not known
- 2003 : AS Tempête Mocaf 8–0 Ouham Pendé de Bozoum
- 2004 : TP USCA Bangui 2–0 Onze Carats de la Mambéré Kadéï
- 2005 : TP USCA Bangui defeated Lobaye Selection
- 2006 : not known
- 2007 : not known
- 2008 : Anges de Fatima 2–1 Stade Centrafricain

Coupe Barthélémy Boganda

- 2009 : Anges de Fatima 3–1 Stade Centrafricain
- 2010 : DFC8 1-0 Stade Centrafricain
- 2011 : AS Tempête Mocaf 2–1 (aet) DFC8
- 2012 : Final between Anges de Fatima and Olympic Real de Bangui
- 2013-2015 : not known
- 2016 : Anges de Fatima 1–0 Sica Sport
- 2017 : Anges de Fatima 1–0 Olympic Real de Bangui
- 2018 : Anges de Fatima 1–0 Olympic Real de Bangui
- 2019 : Stade Centrafricain 4–0 Anges de Fatima
- 2020 : AS Tempête Mocaf 1–1 DFC8 (4–3 pen)
- 2021 : Castel Foot 2–1 Olympic Real de Bangui
