= Publique Sportive Mouara =

- Full name: Publique Sportive Mouara
- Ground: Barthélemy Boganda Stadium
- Capacity: 35,000
- Chairman: ?
- Manager: ?
- League: Central African Republic League

Publique Sportive Mouara is an association football club from Central African Republic based in Bangui.

The team has won the Central African Republic League in 1981 and 1986.

== Stadium ==
Currently the team plays at the 35,000 capacity Barthélemy Boganda Stadium.

== Honours ==
- Central African Republic League: 1981, 1986
