= Junior Gourrier =

Central African footballer

Personal information
- Full name: Junior Gourrier
- Date of birth: 12 April 1992 (age 34)
- Place of birth: Bangui, Central African Republic
- Position: Midfielder

Team information
- Current team: Cercle Mbéri Sportif

Senior career*
| Years | Team | Apps | (Gls) |
| 2011 | DFC 8ème Arrondissement | | |
| 2011–2012 | AS Pélican | | |
| 2012–2015 | DFC 8ème Arrondissement | | |
| 2015– | Cercle Mbéri Sportif | | |

International career^{‡}
| 2007– | Central African Republic | 12 | (3) |
- * Club domestic league appearances and goals as of 22:51, 15 September 2015 (UTC) ‡ National team caps and goals as of 22:51, 11 June 2017 (UTC)

Junior Gourrier (born 12 April 1992) is a Central African footballer who plays for Gabonese club Cercle Mbéri Sportif.

== International career ==
=== International goals ===
Scores and results list Central African Republic's goal tally first.

| No | Date | Venue | Opponent | Score | Result | Competition |
|---|---|---|---|---|---|---|
| 1. | 6 September 2015 | Barthélemy Boganda Stadium, Bangui, Central African Republic | DR Congo | 2–0 | 2–0 | 2017 Africa Cup of Nations qualification |
| 2. | 13 October 2015 | Mahamasina Municipal Stadium, Antananarivo, Madagascar | Madagascar | 1–1 | 2–2 | 2018 FIFA World Cup qualification |
| 3. | 11 June 2017 | Barthélemy Boganda Stadium, Bangui, Central African Republic | Rwanda | 1–0 | 2–1 | 2019 Africa Cup of Nations qualification |
