= US Cattin =

Central African Republic football club

- Full name: Union Sportive Cattin
- Ground: Barthélemy Boganda Stadium
- Capacity: 35,000
- League: Central African Republic League - D2

Union Sportive Cattin is an association football club from Central African Republic based in Bangui.

In 1968 the team won the Central African Republic League.

== Stadium ==
Currently the team plays at the 35,000 capacity Barthelemy Boganda Stadium.

== Honours ==
- Central African Republic League

Champion (1): 1968

== Performance in CAF competitions ==
- African Cup of Champions Clubs: 1 appearance

1969 – First Round
