= Anégrée Freese =

AF
- Full name: Anégrée Freese
- Ground: Barthélemy Boganda Stadium
- Capacity: 35,000
- League: Central African Republic League

Anégrée Freese is a football (soccer) club from Central African Republic based in Bangui.

The team plays in the Central African Republic League.

== Stadium ==
Currently the team plays at the 35,000-capacity Barthelemy Boganda Stadium.
