= Thibault Ban =

Central African Republic footballer

Personal information
- Date of birth: 13 August 1996 (age 30)
- Place of birth: Central African Republic
- Height: 1.74 m (5 ft 9 in)
- Position: Defender

Team information
- Current team: Anges de Fatima

Senior career*
Years	Team	Apps	(Gls)
2017–	Anges de Fatima		

International career^{‡}
2018–	Central African Republic	5	(0)
- * Club domestic league appearances and goals as of 22:37, 1 September 2021 (UTC) ‡ National team caps and goals as of 22:37, 1 September 2021 (UTC)

Thibault Ban (born 13 August 1996) is a Central African footballer who plays as a defender for Anges de Fatima and the Central African Republic national team.

== Club career ==
Ban debuted with the Central African Republic national team in a 0–0 2019 Africa Cup of Nations qualification tie with Ivory Coast on 16 October 2016.
