= SC de Bangui =

Association football club in Central African Republic

- Full name: Sporting Club de Bangui
- Ground: Barthélemy Boganda Stadium
- Capacity: 35,000
- Chairman: Jean-Marie Lorenzon
- League: Central African Republic League
- 2013: 2nd

Sporting Club de Bangui is a football (soccer) club from the Central African Republic based in Bangui.

The team plays in the Central African Republic League.

== Stadium ==
Currently the team plays at the 35,000-capacity Barthélemy Boganda Stadium.

== Performance in CAF competitions ==
- 1979 African Cup Winners' Cup
- 1981 African Cup of Champions Clubs
- 1993 African Cup of Champions Clubs
- 1998 African Cup Winners' Cup

== Current players ==
- (Central African Republic) Mamadi Saoudi
- (France) Ange Oueifio
- (Ghana) Lawrence Adjei
