= 2019 Africa Cup of Nations qualification Group H =

Group H of the 2019 Africa Cup of Nations qualification tournament was one of the twelve groups to decide the teams which qualified for the 2019 Africa Cup of Nations finals tournament. The group consisted of four teams: Ivory Coast, Guinea, Central African Republic, and Rwanda.

The teams played against each other in home-and-away round-robin format between June 2017 and March 2019.

Guinea and Ivory Coast, the group winners and runners-up respectively, qualified for the 2019 Africa Cup of Nations.

== Standings ==
Pos	Team	Pld	W	D	L	GF	GA	GD	Pts	Qualification	Guinea national football team	Ivory Coast national football team	Central African Republic national football team	Rwanda national football team
1	Guinea	6	3	3	0	8	4	+4	12	Final tournament	—	1–1	1–0	2–0
2	Ivory Coast	6	3	2	1	12	5	+7	11	Final tournament	2–3	—	4–0	3–0
3	Central African Republic	6	1	3	2	4	8	−4	6		0–0	0–0	—	2–1
4	Rwanda	6	0	2	4	5	12	−7	2		1–1	1–2	2–2	—

Source: CAF
Rules for classification: Qualification tiebreakers

== Matches ==
10 June 2017
18:00 UTC+0

Ivory Coast	2–3	Guinea
Doumbia 14', 61'	Report	Diallo 31'; Kamano 65'; Keïta 78'

Stade Bouaké, Bouaké
Referee: Hélder Martins de Carvalho (Angola)
11 June 2017
15:00 UTC+1

Central African Republic	2–1	Rwanda
Gourrier 46'; Kéïta 90+3'	Report	Sugira 90+1'

Barthélemy Boganda Stadium, Bangui
Referee: Antoine Effa (Cameroon)

9 September 2018
15:30 UTC+2

Rwanda	1–2	Ivory Coast
Kagere 64'	Report	Kodjia 45'; Gradel 48'

Stade Régional Nyamirambo, Kigali
Referee: Jackson Pavaza (Namibia)
9 September 2018
16:30 UTC+0

Guinea	1–0	Central African Republic
Soumah 73'	Report

Stade du 28 Septembre, Conakry
Referee: Mustapha Ghorbal (Algeria)

12 October 2018
16:30 UTC+0

Guinea	2–0	Rwanda
Kamano 37' (pen.); Cissé 72'	Report

Stade du 28 Septembre, Conakry
Referee: El Fadil Mohamed (Sudan)
12 October 2018
17:00 UTC+0

Ivory Coast	4–0	Central African Republic
Kodjia 26'; Bailly 52'; Doukouré 58'; Cornet 75'	Report

Stade Bouaké, Bouaké
Referee: Alex Muhabi (Uganda)

16 October 2018
15:30 UTC+2

Rwanda	1–1	Guinea
Tuyisenge 77'	Report	Kanté 31'

Stade Régional Nyamirambo, Kigali
Referee: Bernard Camille (Seychelles)
16 October 2018
15:00 UTC+1

Central African Republic	0–0	Ivory Coast
	Report

Barthélemy Boganda Stadium, Bangui
Referee: Janny Sikazwe (Zambia)

18 November 2018
15:30 UTC+2

Rwanda	2–2	Central African Republic
Tuyisenge 10', 45'	Report	Habibou 27'; Kondogbia 90+5'

Stade Huye, Butare
Referee: Boubou Traoré (Mali)
18 November 2018
17:00 UTC+0

Guinea	1–1	Ivory Coast
Yattara 11'	Report	Seri 21'

Stade du 28 Septembre, Conakry
Referee: Rédouane Jiyed (Morocco)

23 March 2019
17:00 UTC+0

Ivory Coast	3–0	Rwanda
Pépé 7'; Bailly 67'; Cornet 72'	Report

Stade Félix Houphouët-Boigny, Abidjan
Referee: Tsegay Mogos Teklu (Eritrea)
24 March 2019
15:00 UTC+1

Central African Republic	0–0	Guinea
	Report

Barthélemy Boganda Stadium, Bangui
Referee: Juste Ephrem Zio (Burkina Faso)

== Goalscorers ==
There were 29 goals scored in 12 matches, for an average of 2.42 goals per match.

3 goals

- (Rwanda) Jacques Tuyisenge

2 goals

- (Ivory Coast) Eric Bailly
- (Ivory Coast) Maxwel Cornet
- (Ivory Coast) Seydou Doumbia
- (Ivory Coast) Jonathan Kodjia
- (Guinea) François Kamano

1 goal

- (Central African Republic) Junior Gourrier
- (Central African Republic) Habib Habibou
- (Central African Republic) Salif Kéïta
- (Central African Republic) Geoffrey Kondogbia
- (Guinea) Ibrahima Cissé
- (Guinea) Sadio Diallo
- (Guinea) José Kanté
- (Guinea) Naby Keïta
- (Guinea) Mohamed Yattara
- (Guinea) Seydouba Soumah
- (Ivory Coast) Cheick Doukouré
- (Ivory Coast) Max Gradel
- (Ivory Coast) Nicolas Pépé
- (Ivory Coast) Jean Michaël Seri
- (Rwanda) Meddie Kagere
- (Rwanda) Ernest Sugira
