= Salif Keita (disambiguation) =

Salif Keita (born 1949) is a Malian singer-songwriter.

Salif Keita or Salif Keïta may also refer to:

- Salif Keïta (Malian footballer) (1946-2023), Malian footballer
- Salif Keita (Senegalese footballer) (born 1975), Senegalese footballer
- Salif Kéïta (Central African footballer) (born 1990), Central African Republican footballer
