= Salif Kéïta (Central African footballer) =

Central African Republic footballer

Personal information
- Date of birth: 22 September 1990 (age 36)
- Place of birth: Bégoua, Central African Republic
- Height: 1.84 m (6 ft 0 in)
- Position: Centre-back

Team information
- Current team: SCAF

Senior career*
Years	Team	Apps	(Gls)
2009–2010	Coton Sport		
2010	Atlético do Namibe		
2010–2011	US Bitam		
2011–2014	Difaâ El Jadidi	58	(0)
2015	RC Arbaâ	3	(0)
2016–2017	Motema Pembe		
2018	Mangasport		
2019	Erbil		
2020–	SCAF		

International career^{‡}
2007–2021	Central African Republic	31	(3)
- * Club domestic league appearances and goals ‡ National team caps and goals as of 7 June 2021

Salif Kéïta (born 10 April 1990) is a Central African international footballer who plays for SCAF as a defender. He played at the 2014 FIFA World Cup qualification.

== Career statistics ==
=== International ===
Central African Republic
Year	Apps	Goals
2007	4	0
2010	2	0
2011	2	0
2012	5	0
2013	4	1
2015	1	0
2016	4	1
2017	1	1
2018	5	0
2020	1	0
2021	2	0
Total	31	3

Statistics accurate as of match played 7 June 2021

=== International goals ===
Scores and results list Central African Republic's goal tally first.

#	Date	Venue	Opponent	Score	Result	Competition
1.	7 September 2013	Stade Alphonse Massemba-Débat, Brazzaville, Congo	Ethiopia	1–0	1–2	2014 FIFA World Cup qualification
2.	28 March 2016	Barthélemy Boganda Stadium, Bangui, Central African Republic	Madagascar	1–1	2–1	2017 Africa Cup of Nations qualification
3.	11 June 2017	Barthélemy Boganda Stadium, Bangui, Central African Republic	Rwanda	2–1	2–1	2019 Africa Cup of Nations qualification
