= 1969 African Cup of Champions Clubs =

Tournament details
- Dates: April 1969 - 9 January 1970
- Teams: 20 (from 1 confederation)

Final positions
- Champions: (United Arab Republic) Ismaily (1st title)
- Runners-up: (Democratic Republic of the Congo) TP Englebert

Tournament statistics
- Matches played: 35
- Goals scored: 137 (3.91 per match)
- Top scorer: (United Arab Republic) Ali Abo Greisha (8 goals)

The African Cup of Champions Clubs 1969 was the 5th edition of the annual international club football competition held in the CAF region (Africa), the African Cup of Champions Clubs. It determined that year's club champion of association football in Africa.

The tournament was played by 20 teams and used a knock-out format with ties played home and away. Ismaily SC from United Arab Republic won the final, and became CAF club champion for the first time, beating Congo-Kinshasa's TP Englebert, who made their third final in a row.

== Preliminary round ==
Team 1	Agg.	Team 2	1st leg	2nd leg
Africa Sports (Ivory Coast)	7–1	(Gabon) Olympique Sportif	5–1	2–0
Hoga Mogadishu (Somalia)	3–4	(Sudan) Burri Khartoum	2–0	1–4
FC Saint Eloi Lupopo (Democratic Republic of the Congo)	w/o^{1}	(Central African Republic) US Cattin	—	—
Young Africans (Tanzania)	4–3	(Madagascar) Fitarikandro	4–1	0–2

^{1} US Cattin withdrew.

== First round ==
Team 1	Agg.	Team 2	1st leg	2nd leg
Asante Kotoko (Ghana)	6–2	(Republic of the Congo) Patronage Sainte-Anne	5–1	1–1
Al-Tahaddy (Libya)	0–8	(United Arab Republic) Ismaily	0–5	0–3
Burri Khartoum (Sudan)	3–4	(Kenya) Gor Mahia	2–4	1–0
Caïman Douala (Cameroon)	1–3	(Democratic Republic of the Congo) FC Saint Eloi Lupopo	0–0	1–3
Saint-George SA (Ethiopia)	0–5	(Tanzania) Young Africans	0–0	0–5
Secteur 6 (Niger)	1–8	(Togo) Étoile Filante (Lomé)	1–5	0–3
TP Englebert (Democratic Republic of the Congo)	4–3	(Ivory Coast) Africa Sports	2–1	2–2
US FRAN (Republic of Upper Volta)	2–9^{1}	(Guinea) Conakry II	2–7	0–2^{1}

^{1} US FRAN withdrew after the first leg.

== Quarter-finals ==
Team 1	Agg.	Team 2	1st leg	2nd leg
Asante Kotoko (Ghana)	2–2^{1}	(Tanzania) Young Africans	1–1	1–1
Ismaily (United Arab Republic)	4–2	(Kenya) Gor Mahia	3–1	1–1
Conakry II (Guinea)	10–3	(Democratic Republic of the Congo) FC Saint Eloi Lupopo	7–2	3–1
TP Englebert (Democratic Republic of the Congo)	4–2	(Togo) Étoile Filante (Lomé)	4–1	0–1

^{1} Asante Kotoko won after drawing of lots.

== Semi-finals ==
Team 1	Agg.	Team 2	1st leg	2nd leg
Asante Kotoko (Ghana)	4–5	(United Arab Republic) Ismaily	2–2	2–3
TP Englebert (Democratic Republic of the Congo)	7–5	(Guinea) Conakry II	4–0	3–5

== Final ==
22 December 1969
--:-- UTC+1

TP Englebert (Democratic Republic of the Congo)	2–2	(United Arab Republic) Ismaily
Tshinabu 8' (pen.); Mulenda 42'		Abdel-Razak 9'; El-Sennari 11'

20 May Stadium, Kinshasa
Attendance: 80,000
Referee: Stanislas Kamdem (Cameroon)
9 January 1970
14:30 UTC+2

Ismaily (United Arab Republic)	3–1	(Democratic Republic of the Congo) TP Englebert
Abo Greisha 31'; Abdel-Razak 70' (pen.), 88'		Kalonzo 52'

Naser Stadium, Cairo
Attendance: 130,000
Referee: Tsimba (Ethiopia)

== Champion ==
1969 African Cup of Champions Clubs

Ismaily
First Title

== Top scorers ==
The top scorers from the 1969 African Cup of Champions Clubs are as follows:

Rank	Name	Team	Goals
1	(United Arab Republic) Ali Abo Greisha	(United Arab Republic) Ismaily	8
2	(United Arab Republic) Sayed Abdel-Razak	(United Arab Republic) Ismaily	6
3	(Democratic Republic of the Congo) André Kalonzo	(Democratic Republic of the Congo) TP Englebert	5
3	(Ghana) Osei Kofi	(Ghana) Asante Kotoko	5
5	(Guinea) Chérif Souleymane	(Guinea) Conakry II	4
5	(United Arab Republic) Amiro Darwish	(United Arab Republic) Ismaily	4
7	(Democratic Republic of the Congo) Kamunda Tshinabu	(Democratic Republic of the Congo) TP Englebert	3
7	(Guinea) Petit Sory	(Guinea) Conakry II	3
9	(Ghana) Orlando Osumanu	(Ghana) Asante Kotoko	2
9	(Guinea) Soriba Soumah	(Guinea) Conakry II	2
9	(Guinea) Tolo	(Guinea) Conakry II	2
9	(Kenya) William Ouma	(Kenya) Gor Mahia	2
9	(Tanzania) Kitwana Manara	(Tanzania) Young Africans	2
9	(United Arab Republic) Abdel Aziz Hendawy	(United Arab Republic) Ismaily	2
