= Burri SC =

Sudanese football club

- Full name: Burri Sports Club
- Founded: 7 November 1935
- Ground: Khartoum Stadium, Khartoum, Sudan
- Capacity: 23,000
- League: Khartoum League

Burri Sports Club (Arabic: نادي بري الرياضي) is a Sudanese football club based in Khartoum. They played in the top division in Sudanese football, Sudan Premier League.

== History ==
The idea to create the club was in 1918 but the club was officially founded on 7 November 1935. The team participated in the 1969 African Cup of Champions Clubs after winning the championship the same year.

== Stadium ==
Currently the team plays at the 23,000 capacity Khartoum Stadium.

== Honours ==
Burri SC Honours
Type	Competition	Titles	Seasons
Domestic (SFA)	Sudan League / Sudan Premier League	1	1968

== Performance in CAF competitions ==
=== CAF Champions League ===
- CAF Champions League: 1 appearance

No	Years	Pld	W	D	L	GF	GA
1	1969 – First Round	4	2	0	2	7	7
Total		4	2	0	2	7	7

No	Years	Clubs	Pld	W	D	L	GF	GA
1	1969	(Somalia) Hoga	2	1	0	1	4	3
2	1969	(Kenya) Gor Mahia F.C.	2	1	0	1	3	4
