= Jordan Botaka =

Congolese footballer (born 1993)

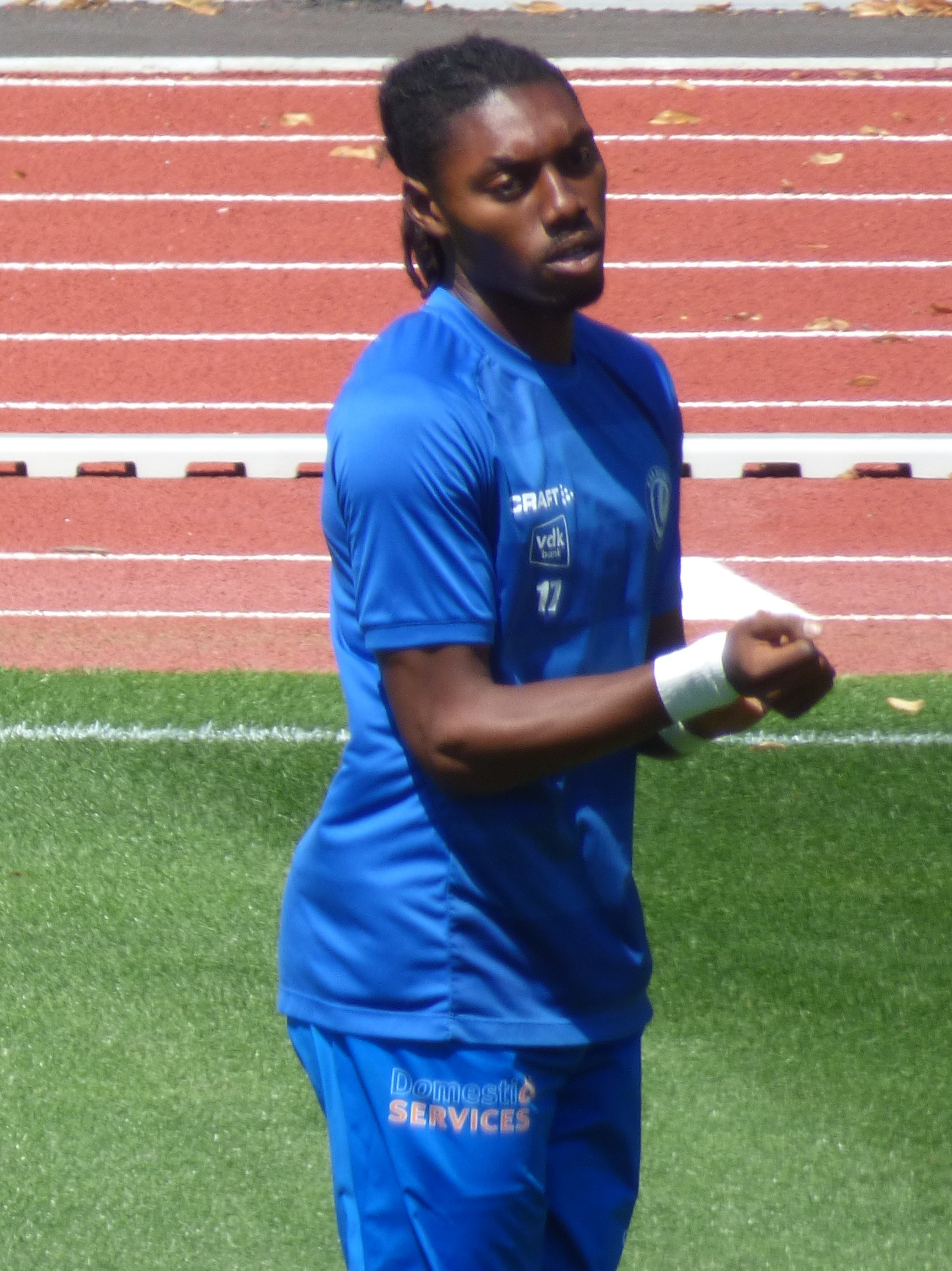
- Botaka in 2020

Personal information
- Full name: Jordan Rolly Botaka
- Date of birth: 24 June 1993 (age 33)
- Place of birth: Kinshasa, Zaire
- Height: 1.84 m (6 ft 0 in)
- Positions: Winger; forward

Team information
- Current team: Union SG II
- Number: 14

Youth career
- 2001–2004: Westlandia
- 2004–2004: ADO Den Haag
- 2005–2007: Anderlecht
- 2007–2008: Beveren
- 2008–2010: Lokeren
- 2010–2012: Club Brugge

Senior career*
| Years | Team | Apps | (Gls) |
| 2012–2013 | Club Brugge | 0 | (0) |
| 2013 | → Belenenses (loan) | 1 | (0) |
| 2013–2015 | Excelsior | 73 | (11) |
| 2015–2017 | Leeds United | 13 | (0) |
| 2016–2017 | → Charlton Athletic (loan) | 26 | (2) |
| 2017–2020 | Sint-Truiden | 84 | (11) |
| 2020–2023 | Gent | 8 | (0) |
| 2021 | → Charleroi (loan) | 10 | (0) |
| 2022 | → Fortuna Sittard (loan) | 7 | (0) |
| 2022–2023 | → Hapoel Jerusalem (loan) | 34 | (3) |
| 2023–2024 | Ashdod | 25 | (3) |
| 2024–2025 | Ironi Tiberias | 33 | (6) |
| 2025– | Union SG II | 29 | (13) |

International career
| 2012 | Netherlands U19 | 3 | (0) |
| 2015–2021 | DR Congo | 23 | (4) |
- * Club domestic league appearances and goals as of 28 June 2026

Jordan Rolly Botaka (born 24 June 1993) is a Congolese professional footballer who plays for Union SG II and the DR Congo national team.

He formerly played for Club Brugge, Belenenses (on loan), Excelsior, Sint-Truiden, Gent, Charleroi and Fortuna Sittard. He has been nicknamed 'The Wizard' due to his quick feet, trickery and skill with the ball.

== Career ==
Botaka was born in Kinshasa, the son of Congolese parents. Botaka started his career at Dutch side Westlandia and ADO Den Haag, before his parents moved to Antwerp where he joined the academies of Anderlecht, Beveren and KSC Lokeren. He also has a Dutch passport.

=== Club Brugge ===
Following vague interest by Newcastle United, Botaka joined Club Brugge from Lokeren on 23 January 2012, a 2 and half year contract.

Botaka spent the whole year at the club, playing in the club's reserve. To help gain first team experience, Botaka joined Portuguese Belenenses on loan in 2013, where Mitchell van der Gaag was Manager. The club also stipulated an option to buy Botaka on a permanent deal. However, due to an administrative error, Botaka could not play official matches for the club.

=== Excelsior ===
After his spell in Portugal, Botaka was released to Club Brugge and joined Feyenoord on trial but due to Feyenoord's close links with feeder club Excelsior, Botaka went on trial for the side in June 2013. After impressing the club's management during his four weeks trial there, he joined the then Eerste Divisie side Excelsior on 27 July 2013.

Botaka made his Excelsior debut in the opening game of the season on 2 August 2013, where he started the whole game, in a 2–2 draw against Helmond Sport. He then scored his first goals for the side on 6 October 2013, in a 3–1 win over Jong Ajax. After missing out one game, due to illness, he returned from injury and then scored again on 25 October 2013, in a 3–1 win over FC Eindhoven. After ending his three months goal drought, Botaka went on a goal-scoring spree between 14 February 2014 and 7 March 2014 against FC Eindhoven (twice), VVV-Venlo, Achilles '29 and Fortuna Sittard. Shortly after, Botaka extended his contract with the club on 17 March 2014. In first season at the club during the 2013–14 season, the club was managed by head coach Jon Dahl Tomasson and then Marinus Dijkhuizen and went on to score 10 goals in 36 league games to earn Excelsior's promotion to Eredivisie after finishing 3rd and earning promotion via the Eerste Divisie playoffs.

Amid to a transfer move to Heerenveen in the summer transfer window, Botaka ended the speculation when he signed a two-year contract with the club, keeping him until 2016. At the start of the 2014–15 season, Botaka made his Eredivisie debut in the opening game of the season, in a 1–1 draw against NAC Breda. This was followed up by scoring in a 3–2 win over Go Ahead Eagles on 17 August 2014. Two months later, on 30 October 2014, he scored in the third round of the KNVB Beker, in a 3–0 win over WKE Emmen. At the end of the season 2014–15 season, Botaka made 33 appearances in Eredivisie scoring 1 goal and helped keep Excelsior in the Eredivisie, having missed one match over a thigh injury.

In the summer transfer window of 2015, Botaka continued to be linked with a move away from Excelsior, with Swiss side Sion interested in signing him. However, Botaka was not interested in a move to Sion and stayed there in the final months at Excelsior. Amid to the transfer move, Botaka made four appearances for the side.

=== Leeds United ===
On transfer deadline day 1 September 2015, Botaka signed for English club Leeds United on a two-year deal, with a club option for a further two years; the transfer fee was undisclosed but reported to be around £1 million. He was given the number 20 shirt for the 2015/16 season.

On 27 September, Botaka made his Leeds United debut, starting for Leeds in a 3–0 loss against Middlesbrough. After originally becoming a bit part player at Leeds under new head coach Steve Evans, where Evans has questioned Botaka's work-rate, Botaka had impressed in training and came back into the team towards the end of the season with Evans saying that Leeds 'have a real player here' speaking of Botaka. On 24 April 2016, after gaining an assist for Stuart Dallas in a 2–2 draw against Hull, on his return to form, Botaka credited his performances on to wanting to prove Evans earlier season criticism wrong.

Ahead of the 2016–17 season, Botaka found his first team opportunity limited following the new management of Garry Monk. As a result, he was subjected to be linked with a move away from Leeds United. Botaka was released at the end of the 2016/17 season, following his loan at Charlton Athletic.

==== Charlton Athletic (loan) ====
On 11 August 2016, Botaka joined Charlton Athletic on a season long loan.

Botaka made his Charlton Athletic debut, coming on as a second-half substitute for Ricky Holmes, in a 1–1 draw against Northampton Town on 13 August 2016. During a 1–0 loss against Rochdale on 1 October 2016, he was subjected of boos from Charlton Athletic after coming on as a late substitute, with Manager Russell Slade described it as “slightly disrespectful”. Although Botaka was out over an injury and international commitment by the end of the year, he then got his first start, playing the whole game, in a 0–0 draw against Bradford City on 10 December 2016. It wasn't until on 18 February 2017 when he scored in a 3–3 draw against Rochdale. He scored again on 4 March 2017, in a 2–1 loss against Northampton Town. Although he subsequently spent most of the season on the substitute bench, Botaka went on to make a total of 29 appearances and scored 2 times.

=== Sint Truiden ===
After being released by Leeds United, Botaka returned to Belgium, signing for Sint-Truiden, signing a three-year contract on 26 June 2017 before the start of the 2017–18 season. He previously went on trial with the side four years prior to the move.

Botaka made his Sint Truiden debut in the opening game of the season, coming on as a second-half substitute for Samuel Asamoah, in a 3–2 win over Gent. In the third round of the Beker Van Belgie against Leuven on 19 September 2017, he scored his first goal for the club, in a 4–2 win.

=== Gent ===
After three seasons with Sint-Truiden, Botaka was signed by Gent in May 2020 on a four-year deal. In January 2021, he was sent on loan to Charleroi with an option to buy. Upon his return from loan, he was not registered by Gent on their squads for either Belgian First Division A or UEFA Europa Conference League. He reportedly had talks during the summer of 2021 with Turkish clubs BB Erzurumspor and Konyaspor, but the transfer did not happen and he remained on Gent's books. On 28 January 2022, he was loaned to Fortuna Sittard in the Netherlands until the end of the season.

On 15 August 2022, Botaka was loaned to Israeli Premier League club Hapoel Jerusalem. He made his first appearance on August 20 in a league fixture against Hapoel Hadera F.C., in which he scored a goal in a 1–1 draw.

== International career ==
After representing Netherlands U19 at international level in 2012, Bokata was selected by Dutch coach Wim Van Zwam for the DR Congo national team and Botaka accepted the call up to the country of his birth, making his debut for Congo against Iran on 28 March 2015.

On 9 June 2015, Botaka scored for DR Congo (and his first goal) in a 1–1 draw against Cameroon. On 12 October 2015, Botaka scored his second goal for DR Congo in a 2–1 victory against Gabon, after scoring a rebound from Yannick Bolasie's shot. The following year, Botaka scored two more goals against Madagascar.

Botaka was named in the 2017 Africa Cup of Nations squad for DR Congo during the tournament in January 2017.

== Career statistics ==
=== Club ===
As of 1 June 2024

| Club | Season | League | | | National Cup | | Continental | | Other | | Total | |
| Club | Season | Division | Apps | Goals | Apps | Goals | Apps | Goals | Apps | Goals | Apps | Goals |
|---|---|---|---|---|---|---|---|---|---|---|---|---|
| Club Brugge | 2011-12 | Belgian Pro League | 0 | 0 | — | | — | | — | | 0 | 0 |
| Club Brugge | 2012-13 | Belgian Pro League | 0 | 0 | — | | 0 | 0 | — | | 0 | 0 |
| Club Brugge | Total | | 0 | 0 | — | | 0 | 0 | — | | 0 | 0 |
| Excelsior | 2013-14 | Eerste Divisie | 36 | 10 | 3 | 0 | — | | 4 (Note: Appearance(s) in Promotion/Relegation play-offs) | 0 | 43 | 10 |
| Excelsior | 2014-15 | Eredivisie | 33 | 1 | 5 | 1 | — | | — | | 38 | 2 |
| Excelsior | 2015-16 | Eredivisie | 4 | 0 | — | | — | | — | | 4 | 0 |
| Excelsior | Total | | 73 | 11 | 8 | 1 | — | | 4 | 0 | 85 | 12 |
| Leeds United | 2015-16 | Championship | 13 | 0 | 1 | 0 | — | | — | | 14 | 0 |
| Charlton Athletic (loan) | 2016-17 | League One | 26 | 2 | 3 | 0 | — | | 0 | 0 | 29 | 3 |
| Sint-Truiden | 2017-18 | Belgian Pro League | 26 | 1 | 2 | 1 | — | | 9 (Note: Appearance(s) in Europa League play-offs) | 3 | 37 | 5 |
| Sint-Truiden | 2018-19 | Belgian Pro League | 30 | 7 | 3 | 0 | — | | 10 | 2 | 43 | 9 |
| Sint-Truiden | 2019-20 | Belgian Pro League | 28 | 3 | 2 | 1 | — | | — | | 30 | 4 |
| Sint-Truiden | Total | | 84 | 11 | 7 | 2 | — | | 19 | 5 | 110 | 18 |
| Gent | 2020-21 | Belgian Pro League | 8 | 0 | — | | 7 (Note: Two appearances in UEFA Champions League, Five appearances in UEFA Europa League) | 0 | — | | 15 | 0 |
| Gent | 2021-22 | Belgian Pro League | 0 | 0 | — | | — | | — | | 0 | 0 |
| Gent | Total | | 8 | 0 | — | | 7 | 0 | — | | 15 | 0 |
| Charleroi (loan) | 2020-21 | Belgian Pro League | 10 | 0 | 1 | 0 | — | | — | | 11 | 0 |
| Fortuna Sittard (loan) | 2021-22 | Eredivisie | 7 | 0 | — | | — | | — | | 7 | 0 |
| Hapoel Jerusalem (loan) | 2022–23 | Israeli Premier League | 34 | 3 | 1 | 0 | — | | 1 (Note: Appearance(s) in Toto Cup) | 0 | 36 | 3 |
| Ashdod | 2023–24 | Israeli Premier League | 25 | 3 | 1 | 0 | — | | — | | 26 | 3 |
| Ironi Tiberias | 2024–25 | Israeli Premier League | 0 | 0 | 0 | 0 | — | | — | | 0 | 0 |
| Career Total | | | 280 | 30 | 22 | 3 | 7 | 0 | 25 | 5 | 334 | 38 |

=== International ===
Scores and results list DR Congo's goal tally first, score column indicates score after each Botaka goal.

List of international goals scored by Jordan Botaka
| No. | Date | Venue | Opponent | Score | Result | Competition |
|---|---|---|---|---|---|---|
| 1 | 9 June 2015 | Stade Charles Tondreau, Mons, Belgium | Cameroon | 1–0 | 1–1 | Friendly |
| 2 | 12 October 2015 | Stade de la Cité l'Oie, Visé, Belgium | Gabon | 1–0 | 2–1 | Friendly |
| 3 | 5 June 2016 | Mahamasina Municipal Stadium, Antananarivo, Madagascar | Madagascar | 6–1 | 6–1 | 2017 Africa Cup of Nations qualification |
| 4 | 4 September 2016 | Stade des Martyrs, Kinshasa, DR Congo | Central African Republic | 4–1 | 4–1 | 2017 Africa Cup of Nations qualification |
