= AB Sport =

Moroccan sportswear brand

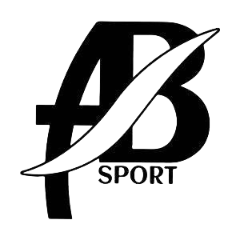
- Logo used since 2016
- Type: Private company
- Industry: Sportswear
- Founded: 2016
- Founder: Bassam El Akel
- Headquarters: Tangier, Morocco
- Products: Jerseys, sports equipment
- Website: absport.ma

AB Sport is a Moroccan company specialized in the design, manufacturing, and distribution of sportswear and equipment, including jerseys and gear for clubs and national teams.

Founded in 2016 in Tangier by Bassam El Akel, the company quickly established itself as an emerging player in the sports equipment sector in Morocco and several African countries. Today, it supplies various clubs across multiple sports, as well as national teams such as those of Mauritania, Sudan, Gabon, and the Central African Republic.

== History ==
The company was founded in 2016 by Bassam El Akel. It began operations by providing kits for the volleyball and basketball sections of IR Tanger. It later expanded its presence to several lower-division football clubs in Morocco, including those in the second and third divisions.

== Partnerships and collaborations ==
=== In Morocco ===
The brand is active in several sports disciplines:

- In volleyball, it is the official kit supplier of the Moroccan Royal Volleyball Federation, including national teams and beach volleyball squads.
- In basketball, AB Sport provides kits for clubs such as KAC Marrakech (KACM).
- In football, it has collaborated with various Moroccan clubs such as US Témara, RCA Zemamra, and Wydad de Fès.

=== International ===
- In Mauritania, AB Sport signed a two-year deal in May 2019 with the Football Federation of the Islamic Republic of Mauritania to outfit the national football teams. It also supplies kits for the basketball club Étoile du Nord (Mauritania). In 2023, a subsidiary of AB Sport was inaugurated in Nouakchott, in the presence of FIFA President Gianni Infantino.
- In Ivory Coast, the company supplies the Williamsville Athletic Club (WAC), a team competing in the Ivorian Ligue 1.
- Since 2023, AB Sport has been the kit supplier of the Sudan national football team. The new kits were presented ahead of the 2025 Africa Cup of Nations.
- In the Central African Republic, a partnership was signed in 2024 with the Central African Football Federation to outfit the national teams.

== Controversies ==
In 2019 AB Sport was accused of plagiarism by Craig Ward, a designer for Nike, regarding the design of the Mauritania national team's kits. He claimed the typography used resembled that of England national football team's jerseys during the 2018 FIFA World Cup. The company denied the accusations, and the original post was later deleted by the author.
