= Gianluca Lorenzoni =

Mozambican footballer (born 2001)

Personal information
- Full name: Gianluca Antonio Remo Lorenzoni
- Date of birth: 22 February 2001 (age 25)
- Place of birth: Maputo, Mozambique
- Height: 1.75 m (5 ft 9 in)
- Position: Forward

Team information
- Current team: Boavista

Youth career
- 2011–2014: Académica Maputo
- 2014–2016: Costa do Sol
- 2017–2018: AT Rennes
- 2018–2019: Rio Ave

Senior career*
Years	Team	Apps	(Gls)
2019–2020	Boavista		
2020–2021	Varzim		
2021–2022	Puente Genil	6	(1)
2023–2024	Gudja United	16	(0)
2025–	Boavista		

International career^{‡}
2021	Mozambique U20	2	(1)
2023–	Mozambique	6	(0)
Medal record
Men's football
Representing Mozambique
COSAFA Cup
Bronze medal – third place	2024 South Africa
- * Club domestic league appearances and goals as of 16:25, 31 December 2025 (UTC) ‡ National team caps and goals as of 16:25, 31 December 2025 (UTC)

Gianluca Antonio Remo Lorenzoni (born 22 February 2001), known simply as Gianluca Lorenzoni, is a Mozambican footballer who currently plays for Santiago South Premier Division club Boavista and the Mozambique national team. He is a left winger.

== Early life ==
Lorenzoni was born in Maputo, Mozambique, to an Italian father and a Mozambican mother.

== Club career ==
Lorenzoni played for Maltese Premier League club Gudja United from 2023 to 2024.

== International career ==
Lorenzoni played for the Mozambique national under-20 team at the 2021 Africa U-20 Cup of Nations.
