= Sica Sport =

Sica
- Full name: Sica Sport
- Founded: 2000
- Ground: Athletics Field
- Capacity: 2,000
- Chairman: ?
- Manager: ?
- League: Central African Republic League
- 2015–16: 4th
Home colours

Sica Sport is a football (soccer) club from Central African Republic based in Bangui. The team plays in the Central African Republic League.

The club was founded in 2000.

== Stadium ==
Currently, the team plays at the 2,000-capacity Athletics Field in Bangui, which is located next to the Barthélemy Boganda Stadium.
