= Football Federation of the Islamic Republic of Mauritania =

Governing body of association football in Mauritanie

CAF
- Founded: 1961
- Location: Ksar, Mauritania
- FIFA affiliation: 1970
- CAF affiliation: 1974 (Provisional member); 1976
- UAFA affiliation: 1989
- President: Ahmed Ould Yahya
- Vice-President: Moussa Khaïry (1st VP); Ely Lekhdeiem (2nd VP)
- Website: http://ffrim.org/

The Football Federation of the Islamic Republic of Mauritania (Arabic: اتحادية الجمهورية الإسلامية الموريتانية لكرة القدم; French: Fédération de football de la République islamique de Mauritanie, FFRIM) is the governing body of football in Mauritania. It was founded in 1961, affiliated to FIFA in 1970 and to CAF in 1976. It organizes the national football league and the national team.

== Logo ==
Old logo

Old logo

Old logo

== Kit supplier ==
Since 2019, AB Sport has been the kit supplier of the national team.
