= Lawrence Adjei =

Ghanaian footballer (born 1979)

Personal information
- Full name: Lawrence Adjei-Okyere
- Date of birth: 23 March 1979 (age 47)
- Place of birth: Accra, Ghana
- Height: 1.74 m (5 ft 8 1/2 in)
- Position: Midfielder

Senior career*
Years	Team	Apps	(Gls)
1997–2000	Obuasi Goldfields	68	(23)
2000–2001	Asante Kotoko	16	(10)
2001	FC Spartak Moscow	1	(0)
2002	Arminia Bielefeld	5	(1)
2002–2003	SV Eintracht Trier 05	15	(8)
2003–2007	Accra Hearts of Oak Sporting Club	29	(6)
2007	Hohhot Black Horse	5	(0)
2008	Sporting Clube de Goa	21	(2)
2008–2010	Sporting Club de Bangui	26	(8)

International career
2001–2005	Ghana	7	(1)
- * Club domestic league appearances and goals

Lawrence Adjei-Okyere (born 23 March 1979) is a Ghanaian former footballer who played as a midfielder.

== Career ==
Adjei started his footballing career at Obuasi Goldfields. He scored the only goal for Goldfields in the first leg of the 1997 CAF Champions League Final.

He joined Russian team Spartak Moscow in the summer of 2001. In January 2002, he moved to Arminia Bielefeld in Germany

In 2005, he won the 2004 CAF Confederation Cup with Accra Hearts of Oak He played in the 2005 CAF Super Cup but was sent off.

He played in India from January to June 2008 with Sporting Clube de Goa and scored his first goal for them against East Bengal Club on 6 January 2008. He then moved to Central African Republic team Sporting Club de Bangui.
