= Espérance FC du 5ème Arrondissement =

Espérance
- Full name: Espérance FC du 5ème Arrondissement
- Founded: 2001
- Ground: Athletics Field
- Capacity: 2,000
- League: Central African Republic League
- 2015–16: 5th
Third colours

Espérance FC du 5ème Arrondissement is a football (soccer) club from Central African Republic based in Bangui. The team plays in the Central African Republic League.

The club was founded in 2001.

== Stadium ==
Currently, the team plays at the 2,000-capacity Athletics Field in Bangui, which is located next to the Barthélemy Boganda Stadium.
