= Red Star FC (Bangui) =

Association football club in the Central African Republic

Red Star
- Full name: Red Star Football Club de Bangui
- Founded: 1975; 51 years ago
- Ground: Bangui Ground
- Capacity: 500
- Chairman: François Gbadouma
- Manager: Patrice Mondjokou
- League: Central African Republic League
- 2018/2019: 4th
Home colours

Red Star Football Club, also called Red Star de Bangui is a Central African association football club that currently plays in the Central African Republic League. It is from the capital city of Bangui.

== History ==
For the 2017/18 season, Red Star played in the Deuxième Division, the second-tier league in the county. By the 2018/19 season it was playing the top division.
