= Forces Armées Centrafricaine =

FACA
- Full name: Forces Armées CA
- Ground: Barthelemy Boganda Stadium
- Capacity: 35,000
- Chairman: ?
- Manager: ?
- League: Central African Republic League

Forces Armées CA is an association football club in the Central African Republic based in Bangui.

The team plays in the Central African Republic Second Division.

In 1991 the team the Central African Republic League.

== Stadium ==
Currently the team plays at the 35,000 capacity Barthelemy Boganda Stadium.

== Honours ==
- Central African Republic League: 1991, 1995
