= McCarthy Ofori =

Ghanaian footballer (born 2005)

McCarthy Ofori (born 3 May 2005) is a Ghanaian professional footballer who plays as a defender for Ghanaian Premier League side Techiman Eleven Wonders FC. He is also a member of the Ghana national under-20 football team.

== Career ==
=== Techiman Eleven Wonders ===
Ofori began his career in the Ghana Premier league with Bono-side Techiman Eleven Wonders, making his debut in the 2020–21 Ghana Premier League at the age of 15 years. He made his professional debut on 3 January 2021 in a 1–0 loss match against International Allies, coming on a substitute for Prince Baffoe in the 85th minute.
