= Sebas Koula =

Burkinabé footballer (born 2001)

Personal information
- Full name: Sébastien Koula Tou
- Date of birth: 1 December 2004 (age 21)
- Place of birth: Strasbourg, France
- Height: 1.96 m (6 ft 5 in)
- Position: Goalkeeper

Team information
- Current team: Dijon B

Youth career
- 2010–2013: Vauban Strasbourg
- 2013–2016: Schiltigheim
- 2016–2019: Strasbourg
- 2019–2020: Illzach Modenheim
- 2020–2022: Bourg-Péronnas

Senior career*
Years	Team	Apps	(Gls)
2022–2023	Sabadell II	5	(0)
2022	→ Granollers (loan)	11	(0)
2023–2024	Sabadell	0	(0)
2025–2026	Dunkerque	0	(0)
2026–	Dijon B	0	(0)

International career^{‡}
2024–	Burkina Faso	1	(0)
- * Club domestic league appearances and goals as of 9 May 2026 ‡ National team caps and goals as of 13:06, 7 June 2024 (UTC)

Sébastien "Sebas" Koula Tou (born 1 December 2004) is a professional footballer who plays as a goalkeeper for Championnat National 2 side Dijon B. Born in France, he plays for the Burkina Faso national team.

== Club career ==
Koula began playing football locally in Strasbourg, going through the youth academies of Vauban Strasbourg, Schiltigheim, Strasbourg, Illzach Modenheim, and Bourg-Péronnas. He moved to Spain with Sabadell in 2022, and shortly after moved to Granollers on loan. On 22 August 2023, he returned to Sabadell and signed a professional contract with the club for one season.

== International career ==
Koula was born in France and is of Burkinabé descent. He made the final squad for the Burkina Faso national team at the 2023 Africa Cup of Nations. He debuted with the Burkina Faso national team in a friendly 1–1 tie with Niger on 26 March 2024.
