= Gourriel =

Gourriel is the surname of the following people

- Lourdes Gourriel (born 1957), Cuban baseball player
- Lourdes Gourriel Jr. or Lourdes Gurriel Jr.(born 1993), Cuban baseball player, son of Lourdes Gourriel
- Yuli Gourriel or Yuli Gurriel (born 1984), Cuban baseball player, son of Lourdes Gourriel
