= Amine Ghazoini =

Moroccan footballer (born 2001)

Personal information
- Date of birth: 9 January 2001 (age 25)
- Place of birth: Rome, Italy
- Height: 1.89 m (6 ft 2 in)
- Position: Right-back

Team information
- Current team: Unirea Alba Iulia
- Number: 2

Youth career
- –2020: Frosinone
- 2019–2020: → Torino (loan)
- 2020–2021: Ascoli

Senior career*
| Years | Team | Apps | (Gls) |
| 2021–2024 | Ascoli | 0 | (0) |
| 2021–2022 | → Virton (loan) | 11 | (0) |
| 2022–2023 | → Vis Pesaro (loan) | 31 | (1) |
| 2024 | Monterosi | | |
| 2024–2025 | FC U Craiova | 0 | (0) |
| 2025–2026 | CSM Olimpia Satu Mare | 22 | (1) |
| 2026– | Unirea Alba Iulia | 0 | (0) |

International career
| 2015 | Italy U16 | 2 | (0) |
| 2015–2016 | Morocco U17 | 6 | (1) |
| 2018 | Morocco U20 | 2 | (0) |
- * Club domestic league appearances and goals as of 9 May 2026

Amine Ghazoini (Arabic: أمين غزواني; born 9 January 2001) is a professional footballer who plays as a right-back for Liga III club Unirea Alba Iulia. Born in Italy, he has represented Morocco at youth level.

== Club career ==
On 19 July 2022, Ghazoini was loaned to Vis Pesaro.

Ghazoini's contract with Ascoli was terminated by mutual consent on 30 January 2024.

On 23 February 2024, Ghazoini signed a one-year contract with Monterosi.

On 17 September 2024, he signed a deal with Liga II team FC U Craiova.
