= Central African Football Federation =

Governing body of football in the Central African Republic

CAF
- Founded: 1961
- FIFA affiliation: 1964
- CAF affiliation: 1968
- President: Celestin Yanindji
- Website: officiel website

The Central African Football Federation (French: Fédération Centrafricaine de Football) (RCA) is the governing body of football in the Central African Republic. It was founded in 1961, affiliated to FIFA in 1964. The offices of the RCA are located in Bangui, the capital city. The federation organizes the national football leagues, including the Central African Republic League, and the national team.

== Achievements ==
- UNIFFAC Cup

Winners 2010

== Kit Supplier ==
Since 2024, AB Sport is the kit supplier of the national team.
