= Olympic Real de Bangui =

Association football club in Central African Republic

Olympic Real
- Full name: Olympic Real de Bangui
- Founded: 1 January 1945; 81 years ago as Réal Olympique Castel
- Ground: Barthélemy Boganda Stadium
- Capacity: 35,000
- League: Central African Republic League
- 2023–24: 3rd
Home colours

Olympic Real de Bangui is a professional football club from Central African Republic based in Bangui.

The club was founded in 1945 as Réal Olympique Castel.

== Achievements ==
- Central African Republic League : 12

1971, 1973, 1975, 1979, 1982, 2000, 2001, 2004, 2010, 2012, 2016, 2017, 2022.

- Central African Republic Coupe Nationale : 2

1989, 1999.

== Performance in CAF competitions ==
- CAF Champions League / African Cup of Champions Clubs: 6 appearances

1972 – First round
1983 – First round
2002 – Preliminary round

2011 – Preliminary round
2013 – Preliminary round
2017 – Preliminary round
2023 – First round

- African Cup Winners' Cup: 2 appearances

1990 – First round
2000 – Preliminary round
