= DFC 8ème Arrondissement =

Association football club in Central African Republic

DFC8
- Full name: Diplomates Football Club du 8ème Arrondissement
- Founded: 1987
- Ground: Barthélemy Boganda Stadium; Bangui
- Capacity: 35,000
- League: Central African Republic League
- 2020-21: 1st
Home colours

Diplomates Football Club du 8ème Arrondissement, usually known as DFC 8ème Arrondissement or DFC8 for a short, is a football (soccer) club from Central African Republic based in Bangui. The team have recently qualified for the round of 32 of 2012 CAF Champions League.

== Achievements ==
- Central African Republic League: 4

2006, 2011, 2016, 2021.

- Central African Republic Coupe Nationale: 1

2010.

== Performance in CAF competitions ==
- CAF Champions League: 2 appearances

2012 – Round of 32
2022 - First Round

- CAF Confederation Cup: 1 appearance

2011 – Preliminary Round

== Current players ==
Note: Flags indicate national team as defined under FIFA eligibility rules; some limited exceptions apply. Players may hold more than one non-FIFA nationality.

| No. | Pos. | Nation | Player |
|---|---|---|---|
| 16 | FW | CTA | Boris Sandjo |
| 49 | GK | CTA | Didier Alex Labib |
| — | DF | CTA | Audin Boutou |

| No. | Pos. | Nation | Player |
|---|---|---|---|
| — | FW | CTA | Terrence Bimale |
| — | FW | CTA | Moussa Limane |
