= TP USCA Bangui =

Association football club in Central African Republic

USCA
- Full name: Tout Puissant Union Sportive Centrafricaine de Bangui
- Ground: Barthélemy Boganda Stadium
- Capacity: 35,000
- League: Central African Republic League
Home colours	Away colours

Tout Puissant Union Sportive Centrafricaine de Bangui is an association football club from Central African Republic based in Bangui.

The team plays in the Central African Republic League.

== Stadium ==
Currently the team plays at the 35,000 capacity Barthélemy Boganda Stadium.

== Honours ==
- Central African Republic League: 1980, 1992
