= AS Tempête Mocaf =

Central African Republic football club

- Full name: Association Sportive Tempête Mocaf
- Nicknames: Le pays (The country); Rouges-noirs (The Red-Blacks)
- Founded: 1940
- Ground: Complexe Sportif Barthélemy Boganda
- Capacity: 35,000
- Chairman: Mathieu Kpangba
- Manager: Cédric Bangadou
- League: Central African Republic League
- 2018–19: 1st
Home colours	Away colours

Association Sportive Tempête Mocaf (first part French for storm) is a Central African Republic football club located in Bangui, Central African Republic. It currently plays in the Central African Republic League.

== Current and former players ==
- (Central African Republic) Armel Oroko
- (Central African Republic) Boris Sandjo

== Titles ==
- Central African Republic League: 12

1976, 1984, 1990, 1993, 1994, 1996, 1997, 1999, 2003, 2009, 2013/14, 2018/19

- Central African Republic Coupe Nationale: 6

1974, 1982, 1985, 1992, 2003, 2011

== Positions ==
- 1999: 1st
- 2003: 1st
- 2009: 1st
- 2011: 2nd
- 2012: 3rd
- 2013–14: 1st
- 2015–16: 2nd
- 2018–19: 1st

== Performance in CAF competitions ==
Tempête Mocaf's results in CAF competition
Season	Competition	Qualification method	Round	Opposition	Home	Away	Aggregate
1975	CAF Cup Winners' Cup	Bangui-Central African Cup winners	1/8 finals	(Republic of Dahomey) Postel Sport	3–0	1–0	3–1
1975	CAF Cup Winners' Cup	Bangui-Central African Cup winners	Quarter-finals	(Senegal) ASC Jeanne d'Arc	1–3	1–1	2–4
1977	African Cup of Champions Clubs	Banguian champions	First round	(Ivory Coast) SC Gagnoa	canc.	canc.	^{1}
1985	African Cup of Champions Clubs	Banguian champions	Preliminary Round	(Angola) Petro de Luanda	1–1	4–1	2–5
1986	CAF Cup Winners' Cup	Bangui-Central African Cup winners	Second round	(Sudan) Al-Merreikh Al-Ubayyid	1–0	1–1	2-1
1986	CAF Cup Winners' Cup	Bangui-Central African Cup winners	Second round	(Egypt) Ismaily SC	2–0	3–0	2-3
1991	African Cup of Champions Clubs	Bangui-Central African champions	Preliminary Round	(Angola) Petro de Luanda	2–4	4–0	2–8
1993	CAF Cup Winners' Cup	Banguian cup winners	Preliminary Round	(Angola) Petro de Luanda	1–2	1–1	2–3
1983	African Cup of Champions Clubs	Bangui Central African champions	Preliminary Round	(Chad) Postel 2000	2–0	0–1	2–1
1983	African Cup of Champions Clubs	Bangui Central African champions	First round	(Guinea) AS Kaloum Star	3–0	1–0	3–1
1983	African Cup of Champions Clubs	Bangui Central African champions	Second round	(Algeria) MC Oran	0–3	7–4	4–11
1997	CAF Champions League	Bangui Central African champions	Preliminary Round	(Chad) AS CotonTchad	canc.	canc.	dq^{2}
1998	CAF Champions League	Bangui Central African champions	Preliminary Round	(Chad) Tourbillon FC	canc.	canc.	dq^{2}
2000	CAF Champions League	Bangui Central African champions	Preliminary Round	(Cape Verde) Sporting Clube da Praia	1–0	2–3	4–2
2000	CAF Champions League	Bangui Central African champions	First round	(Nigeria) Lobi Stars	1–1	2–0	1–3
2004	CAF Champions League	Bangui Central African champions	Preliminary Round	(Ghana) Asante Kotoko	canc	canc.	^{3}
2010	CAF Champions League	Banguian champions	Preliminary Round	(Libya) Al-Ittihad Tripoli	1–2	6–0	1–7
2012	CAF Confederation Cup	Banguian cup winners	Preliminary Round	(Republic of the Congo) AC Léopards	2–2	0–2	2–4
2019	CAF Champions League	Bangui Central African champions	Preliminary Round	(Libya) Al-Nasr SC	1–0	3–1	2–3
2025–26	CAF Champions League	Bangui Central African champions	Preliminary Round	(Mali) Stade Malien	0–5	0–2	0–7

^{1} Gagnoa withdrew
^{2} The club was disqualified for not paying a fee
^{3} Tempête Mocaf withdrew

== Statistics ==
- Best position: Second Round (continental)
