= SCAF Tocages =

Association football club

- Full name: Stade Centrafricaine Tocages
- Founded: 1960
- Ground: Barthélemy Boganda Stadium, Bangui, Central African Republic
- Capacity: 35,000
- League: Central African Republic League
- 2015–16: 6th
Home colours

SCAF Tocages is a football (soccer) club from the Central African Republic based in Bangui.

== Achievements ==
- Central African Republic League: 5

1977, 1985, 1989, 2008, 2018.

- Central African Republic Coupe Nationale: 3

1984, 2001, 2019.

== Performance in CAF competitions ==
- CAF Champions League: 1 appearance

2009 – Preliminary Round

- African Cup of Champions Clubs: 2 appearances

1986 – Second Round
1990 – First Round

== Squad ==
=== First-team squad ===
Note: Flags indicate national team as defined under FIFA eligibility rules; some limited exceptions apply. Players may hold more than one non-FIFA nationality.

No.	Pos.	Nation	Player
1	GK	CTA	Prince Samola
16	GK	YEM	Ahmed Khalil Bakrit
2	DF	CTA	Kevin Bedot
5	MF	CTA	Mamadi Saoudi
7	FW	CTA	Brice Mohi
8	FW	CTA	Delphin Gbazinon
