= Anges de Fatima =

Association football club in Central African Republic

Les Anges de Fatima
- Founded: 1952
- League: Central African Republic League

Les Anges de Fatima is a football (soccer) club from Central African Republic based in Bangui.

The club was previously known as Association Sportive Diables Rouges de Fatima (ASDR Fatima) but was renamed in April 2016.

== Achievements ==
- Central African Republic League: 5

1974, 1978, 1983, 1988, 2005.

- Central African Republic Coupe Nationale: 8

1980, 1981, 1991, 1993, 1998, 2000, 2008, 2009.

== Performance in CAF competitions ==
- CAF Champions League: 2 appearances

2001 – First Round
2006 – Preliminary Round

- African Cup of Champions Clubs: 4 appearances

1975 – First Round
1979 – First Round
1984 – First Round
1989 – First Round

- CAF Confederation Cup: 2 appearances

2010 – Preliminary Round
2013 – Preliminary Round
