= Central African Republic League =

- Founded: 1968; 58 years ago
- Country: Central African Republic
- Confederation: CAF
- Number of clubs: 12
- Level on pyramid: 1
- Relegation to: D2
- Domestic cup: Coupe Nationale
- International cup(s): Champions League; Confederation Cup
- Current champions: AS Tempête Mocaf (2024–25)
- Most championships: Olympic Real de Bangui and AS Tempête Mocaf (13 titles)
- Current: 2024-25 Central African Republic League

The Central African Republic League (Ligue de Bangui, Super Ligue) is the top football league in the Central African Republic. It was created in 1968. The top-flight football league is sanctioned by the Central African Football Federation, the governing body of football in the CAR.

== 2021–22 season ==
Pos.	Team	Location	Stadium	Capacity
1	Olympic Real	Bangui	Barthélemy Boganda Stadium	35,000
2	Red Star de Bangui	Bangui	Bangui Ground	500
3	SCAF Tocages	Bangui	Barthélemy Boganda Stadium	35,000
4	Anges de Fatima	Bangui	Barthélemy Boganda Stadium	35,000
5	Tempête Mocaf	Bangui	Barthélemy Boganda Stadium	35,000
6	Castel Foot			
7	DFC8	Bangui	Barthélemy Boganda Stadium	35,000
8	AS Gbangré			
9	ASOPT			
10	TP USCA	Bangui		
11	ECB			
12	UFC Bangui	Bangui	Barthélemy Boganda Stadium	35,000

== 2023–24 season ==
Pos.	Club	Pld.	W	D	L	GF–GA	Pts.	Av. attendance	Notes
1	Tempête Mocaf	22	16	4	2	42–12	52	782	Champions
2	Red Star de Bangui	22	13	5	4	44–20	44	578	
3	Olympic Real	22	12	6	4	52–29	42	715	
4	SCAF Tocages	22	10	8	4	28–13	38	362	
5	TP USCA Bangui	22	8	9	5	31–30	33	309	
6	DFC8	22	8	5	9	36–29	29	343	
7	SOS Pius Njawe	22	7	8	7	21–26	29	244	
8	Les Anges de Fatima	22	7	6	9	37–31	27	301	
9	AS Gbangré	22	7	5	10	30–45	26	213	
10	AS CNSS	22	4	8	10	16–36	20	182	
11	RC3	22	4	4	14	27–43	16	161	Relegated
12	ASOPT	22	1	2	19	13–44	5	142	Relegated

== Previous winners ==
Years	Champions
1968	US Cattin (1)
1969	Unknown
1970	Unknown
1971	Olympic Real de Bangui (1)
1972	Unknown
1973	Olympic Real de Bangui (2)
1974	Les Anges de Fatima (1)
1975	Olympic Real de Bangui (3)
1976	AS Tempête Mocaf (1)
1977	Stade Centrafricain Tocages (1)
1978	Les Anges de Fatima (2)
1979	Olympic Real de Bangui (4)
1980	USCA Bangui (1)
1981	Publique Sportive Mouara (1)
1982	Olympic Real de Bangui (5)
1983	Les Anges de Fatima (3)
1984	AS Tempête Mocaf (2)
1985	Stade Centrafricain Tocages (2)
1986	Publique Sportive Mouara (2)
1987	Unknown
1988	Les Anges de Fatima (4)
1989	Stade Centrafricain Tocages (3)
1990	AS Tempête Mocaf (3)
1991	Forces armées centrafricaines (1)
1992	USCA Bangui (2)
1993	AS Tempête Mocaf (4)
1994	AS Tempête Mocaf (5)
1995	Forces armées centrafricaines (2)
1996	AS Tempête Mocaf (6)
1997	AS Tempête Mocaf (7)
1999	AS Tempête Mocaf (8)
2000	Olympic Real de Bangui (6)
2001	Olympic Real de Bangui (7)
2002	Championship cancelled
2003	AS Tempête Mocaf (9)
2004	Olympic Real de Bangui (8)
2005	Les Anges de Fatima (5)
2006	DFC 8 (1)
2007	Unknown
2008	Stade Centrafricain Tocages (4)
2009	DFC 8 (2)
2010	Olympic Real de Bangui (9)
2011	DFC 8 (3)
2012	Olympic Real de Bangui (10)
2013–14	AS Tempête Mocaf (10)
2014–15	Not held
2015–16	DFC 8 (4)
2016	Olympic Real de Bangui (11)
2016–17	Olympic Real de Bangui (12)
2017–18	Stade Centrafricain Tocages (5)
2018–19	AS Tempête Mocaf (11)
2019–20	Championship cancelled
2020–21	DFC 8 (5)
2021–22	Olympic Real de Bangui (13)
2022–23	Red Star (1)
2023–24	AS Tempête Mocaf (12)

== Performance by club ==
Club	City	Titles	Last title
Olympic Real	Bangui	13	2021–22
Tempête Mocaf	Bangui	13	2024–25
Les Anges de Fatima	Bangui	5	2005
SCAF Tocages	Bangui	5	2018
DFC8	Bangui	4	2020-21
FACA	Bangui	2	1995
Publique Sportive Mouara	Bangui	2	1986
USCA	Bangui	2	1992
US Cattin	Bangui	1	1968
Red Star de Bangui	Bangui	1	2022–23
