= Barthélemy Boganda Stadium =

Stadium in Bangui, Central African Republic

Stade Barthélemy Boganda

- Location within Central African Republic
- Location: Avenue de France, Bangui, Central African Republic
- Coordinates: 4.3744°N 18.5643°E
- Capacity: 20,000
- Type: Multiuse stadium
- Surface: Grass

Construction
- Groundbreaking: 2003
- Built: 2003–2006
- Opened: 30 December 2006

Tenant
- Central African Republic national football team (2006–2020)

Stade Barthélemy Boganda, in Bangui, is the national stadium of the Central African Republic. It is located at Avenue de France and was used mostly for football matches. The stadium has a maximum capacity of 35,000. It is named after the former president of the country, Barthélemy Boganda. The venue is home to several popular football clubs in the country, including AS Tempête Mocaf.

Construction began in 2003 by the Chinese company Complan. The stadium was handed over to the Central African government on 16 June 2006 and was officially opened on 30 December by president François Bozizé.

During his visits to Kenya, Uganda, and the Central African Republic, Pope Francis celebrated Mass at the stadium on November 30, 2015.

The stadium has not held a match since 2020 when it was sanctioned by FIFA as it no longer met international standards.
