= Aubameyang =

Aubameyang is a Gabonese surname, examples being:

- Pierre Aubameyang (born 1965), Gabonese footballer and father of 3 footballers:
  - Catilina Aubameyang (born 1983)
  - Willy Aubameyang (born 1987)
  - Pierre-Emerick Aubameyang (born 1989)

== See also ==
- Jean-Hilaire Aubame (1912–1989), Gabonese politician
