= List of international goals scored by Pierre-Emerick Aubameyang =

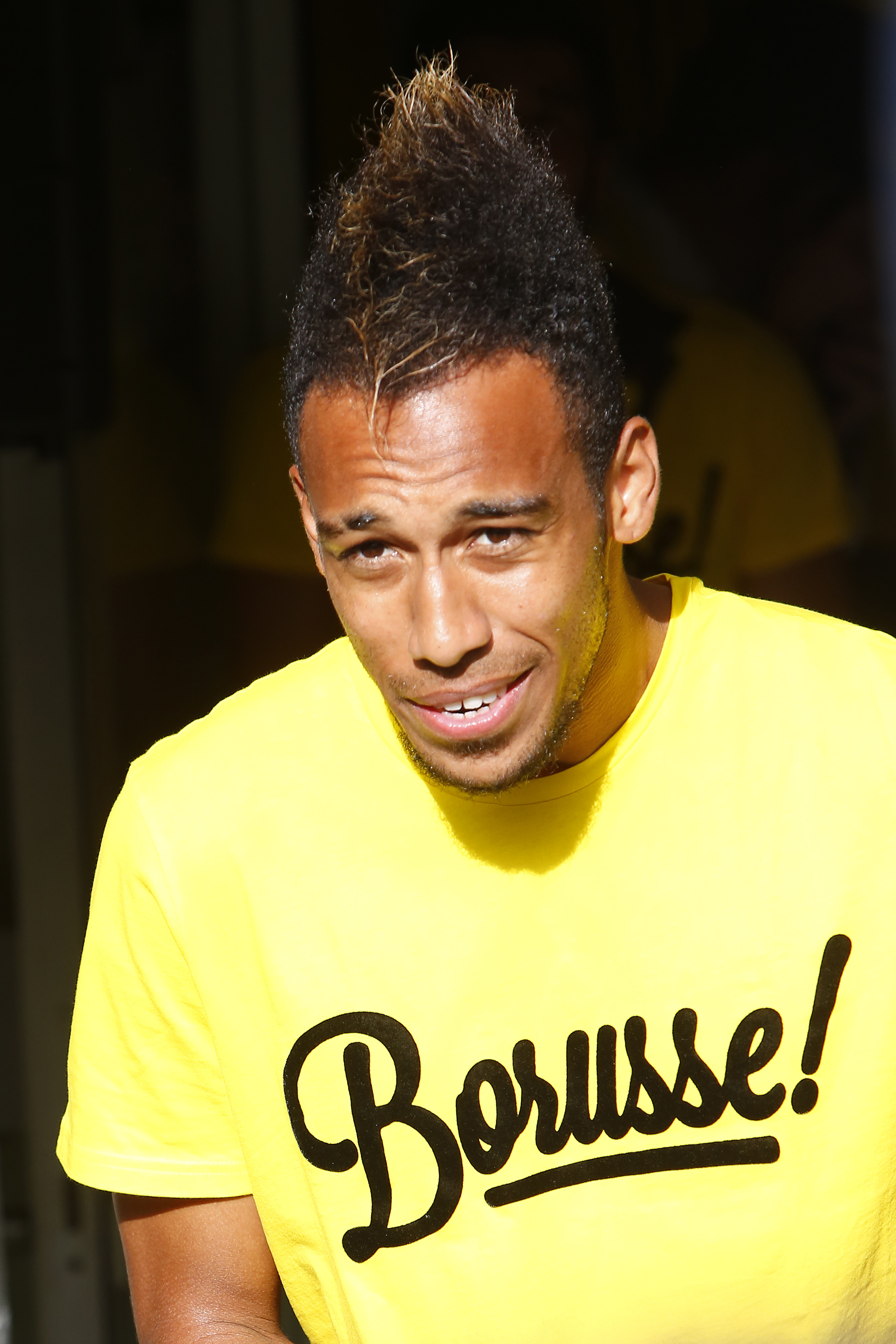
Aubameyang scored 40 goals in 86 caps for Gabon.

Pierre-Emerick Aubameyang is a professional footballer who represented the Gabon national team as a forward between 2009 and 2025. He scored on his international debut for the side in a 2−1 away win against Morocco on 28 March 2009. In total, the 2015 African Footballer of the Year went on to score 40 goals in 86 international appearances, making him the country's all-time top scorer. He surpassed Théodore Nzue Nguema's previous record of 23 goals on 8 September 2018, when he scored in a 1–1 Africa Cup of Nations qualifying draw against Burundi.

Aubameyang scored two international hat-tricks: the first came in a 4−1 FIFA World Cup qualification home win against Niger on 15 June 2013, where all three goals were penalties, and the second was against Gambia in a 4−3 World Cup qualifying win on 10 October 2025, where he scored four goals. Out of all his opponents, he scored the most against Gambia, netting six goals against "The Scorpions". Aubameyang scored six goals at the Africa Cup of Nations, nine in Africa Cup of Nations qualification, and thirteen in FIFA World Cup qualification. The remainder of his goals, twelve, came in friendlies. Aubameyang's most productive calendar year in terms of international goals was 2025, when he scored six goals in five games for "The Panthers". Despite featuring for Gabon for over a decade, Aubameyang never played a match at the FIFA World Cup finals, and never won an international trophy.

Aubameyang's international career was frequently haunted with controversies and misfortune. He was often criticised for being absent from international duty and displaying poor on-field performances, with the team sometimes said to play better in his absence. Following a dispute with the Gabonese Football Federation in 2016, Aubameyang boycotted Gabonese media ahead of the 2017 Africa Cup of Nations, further separating Aubameyang's connection with Gabonese people. Nonetheless, his legacy as a reference point for Gabonese sporting excellence is evident; Gabon head coach Patrice Neveu claimed in 2022 that Aubameyang was "the greatest player in Gabon".

== Goals ==
Scores and results list Gabon's goal tally first, score column indicates score after each Aubameyang goal.

Table key
Indicates Gabon won the match
Indicates the match ended in a draw
Indicates Gabon lost the match

List of international goals scored by Pierre-Emerick Aubameyang
No.	Cap	Date	Venue	Opponent	Score	Result	Competition	Ref.
1	1	28 March 2009	Stade Mohamed V, Casablanca, Morocco	Morocco	1–0	2–1	2010 FIFA World Cup qualification	
2	3	11 August 2009	Stade de l'Amitié, Cotonou, Benin	Benin	1–0	1–1	Friendly	
3	12	19 May 2010	Stade François Coty, Ajaccio, France	Togo	2–0	3–0	Friendly	
4	13	11 August 2010	5 July 1962 Stadium, Algiers, Algeria	Algeria	2–0	2–1	Friendly	
5	17	17 November 2010	Stade Michel Hidalgo, Sannois, France	Senegal	1–2	1–2	Friendly	
6	24	23 January 2012	Stade d'Angondjé, Libreville, Gabon	Niger	1–0	2–0	2012 Africa Cup of Nations	
7	25	27 January 2012	Stade d'Angondjé, Libreville, Gabon	Morocco	1–1	3–2	2012 Africa Cup of Nations	
8	26	31 January 2012	Stade de Franceville, Franceville, Gabon	Tunisia	1–0	1–0	2012 Africa Cup of Nations	
9	30	14 October 2012	Stade d'Angondjé, Libreville, Gabon	Togo	1–2	1–2	2013 Africa Cup of Nations qualification	
10	33	15 June 2013	Stade de Franceville, Franceville, Gabon	Niger	1–1	4–1	2014 FIFA World Cup qualification	
11	33	15 June 2013	Stade de Franceville, Franceville, Gabon	Niger	2–1	4–1	2014 FIFA World Cup qualification	
12	33	15 June 2013	Stade de Franceville, Franceville, Gabon	Niger	4–1	4–1	2014 FIFA World Cup qualification	
13	37	11 October 2014	Stade d'Angondjé, Libreville, Gabon	Burkina Faso	1–0	2–0	2015 Africa Cup of Nations qualification	
14	37	11 October 2014	Stade d'Angondjé, Libreville, Gabon	Burkina Faso	2–0	2–0	2015 Africa Cup of Nations qualification	
15	40	17 January 2015	Estadio de Bata, Bata, Equatorial Guinea	Burkina Faso	1–0	2–0	2015 Africa Cup of Nations	
16	43	25 March 2015	Stade Pierre Brisson, Beauvais, France	Mali	2–2	4–3	Friendly	
17	43	25 March 2015	Stade Pierre Brisson, Beauvais, France	Mali	3–2	4–3	Friendly	
18	45	5 September 2015	Stade d'Angondjé, Libreville, Gabon	Sudan	4–0	4–0	Friendly	
19	46	9 October 2015	Stade Olympique de Radès, Tunis, Tunisia	Tunisia	1–1	3–3	Friendly	
20	49	25 March 2016	Stade de Franceville, Franceville, Gabon	Sierra Leone	1–0	2–1	Friendly	
21	50	2 September 2016	Khartoum Stadium, Khartoum, Sudan	Sudan	1–1	2–1	Friendly	
22	53	14 January 2017	Stade d'Angondjé, Libreville, Gabon	Guinea-Bissau	1–0	1–1	2017 Africa Cup of Nations	
23	54	18 January 2017	Stade d'Angondjé, Libreville, Gabon	Burkina Faso	1–1	1–1	2017 Africa Cup of Nations	
24	57	8 September 2018	Stade d'Angondjé, Libreville, Gabon	Burundi	1–1	1–1	2019 Africa Cup of Nations qualification	
25	60	10 October 2019	Stade Municipal, Saint-Leu-la-Forêt, France	Burkina Faso	1–0	1–0	Friendly	
26	64	12 November 2020	Stade de Franceville, Franceville, Gabon	Gambia	2–0	2–1	2021 Africa Cup of Nations qualification	
27	66	25 March 2021	Stade de Franceville, Franceville, Gabon	DR Congo	3–0	3–0	2021 Africa Cup of Nations qualification	
28	70	11 October 2021	Stade de Franceville, Franceville, Gabon	Angola	1–0	2–0	2022 FIFA World Cup qualification	
29	71	12 November 2021	Stade de Franceville, Franceville, Gabon	Libya	1–0	1–0	2022 FIFA World Cup qualification	
30	72	4 January 2022	The Sevens Stadium, Dubai, United Arab Emirates	Mauritania	1–0	1–1	Friendly	
31	77	11 June 2024	Stade de Franceville, Franceville, Gabon	Gambia	2–1	3–2	2026 FIFA World Cup qualification	
32	78	6 September 2024	Adrar Stadium, Agadir, Morocco	Morocco	1–2	1–4	2025 Africa Cup of Nations qualification	
33	79	10 September 2024	Stade de Franceville, Franceville, Gabon	Central African Republic	1–0	2–0	2025 Africa Cup of Nations qualification	
34	81	23 March 2025	Nyayo National Stadium, Nairobi, Kenya	Kenya	1–0	2–1	2026 FIFA World Cup qualification	
35	81	23 March 2025	Nyayo National Stadium, Nairobi, Kenya	Kenya	2–0	2–1	2026 FIFA World Cup qualification	
36	83	10 October 2025	Moi International Sports Centre, Nairobi, Kenya	Gambia	1–0	4–3	2026 FIFA World Cup qualification	
37	83	10 October 2025	Moi International Sports Centre, Nairobi, Kenya	Gambia	2–1	4–3	2026 FIFA World Cup qualification	
38	83	10 October 2025	Moi International Sports Centre, Nairobi, Kenya	Gambia	3–3	4–3	2026 FIFA World Cup qualification	
39	83	10 October 2025	Moi International Sports Centre, Nairobi, Kenya	Gambia	4–3	4–3	2026 FIFA World Cup qualification	
40	86	28 December 2025	Adrar Stadium, Agadir, Morocco	Mozambique	1–2	2–3	2025 Africa Cup of Nations	

== Statistics ==
Appearances and goals by year
Year	Competitive		Friendly		Total	
Year	Apps	Goals	Apps	Goals	Apps	Goals
2009	6 (Note: Appearances in 2010 FIFA World Cup qualification)	1	1	1	7	2
2010	3 (Note: Appearances in 2010 Africa Cup of Nations)	0	7	3	10	3
2011	—		5	0	5	0
2012	7 (Note: Four appearances and three goals in 2012 Africa Cup of Nations, one appearance in 2014 FIFA World Cup qualification, two appearances and one goal in 2013 Africa Cup of Nations qualification)	4	1	0	8	4
2013	4 (Note: Appearances in 2014 FIFA World Cup qualification)	3	0	0	4	3
2014	4 (Note: Appearances in 2015 Africa Cup of Nations qualification)	2	0	0	4	2
2015	4 (Note: Three appearances and one goal in 2015 Africa Cup of Nations, one appearance in 2018 FIFA World Cup qualification)	1	6	4	10	5
2016	2 (Note: Appearances in 2018 FIFA World Cup qualification)	0	2	2	4	2
2017	4 (Note: Three appearances and two goals in 2017 Africa Cup of Nations, one appearance in 2018 FIFA World Cup qualification)	2	0	0	4	2
2018	2 (Note: Appearances in 2019 Africa Cup of Nations qualification)	1	0	0	2	1
2019	3 (Note: One appearance in 2019 Africa Cup of Nations qualification, two appearances in 2021 Africa Cup of Nations qualification)	0	2	1	5	1
2020	2 (Note: Appearances in 2021 Africa Cup of Nations qualification)	1	0	0	2	1
2021	6 (Note: Five appearances and two goals in 2022 FIFA World Cup qualification, one appearance and one goal in 2021 Africa Cup of Nations qualification)	3	—		6	3
2022	0	0	2	1	2	1
2023	2 (Note: Appearances in 2023 Africa Cup of Nations qualification)	0	0	0	2	0
2024	5 (Note: Two appearances and one goal in 2026 FIFA World Cup qualification, three appearances and two goals in 2025 Africa Cup of Nations qualification)	3	0	0	5	3
2025	6 (Note: Four appearances and six goals in 2026 FIFA World Cup qualification, two appearances and one goal in 2025 Africa Cup of Nations)	7	0	0	6	7
Total	60	28	26	12	86	40

Appearances and goals by competition
Competition	Apps	Goals
Africa Cup of Nations	12	6
Africa Cup of Nations qualification	22	9
FIFA World Cup qualification	26	13
Friendlies	26	12
Total	86	40

Goals by opponent
Opponent	Goals
Gambia	6
Burkina Faso	5
Niger	4
Morocco	3
Kenya	2
Mali	2
Sudan	2
Togo	2
Tunisia	2
Algeria	1
Angola	1
Benin	1
Burundi	1
Central African Republic	1
DR Congo	1
Guinea-Bissau	1
Libya	1
Mauritania	1
Mozambique	1
Senegal	1
Sierra Leone	1
Total	40

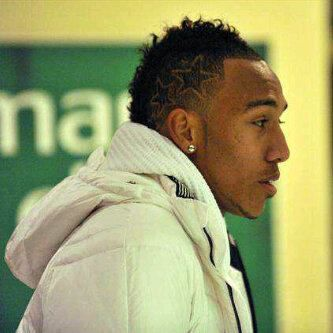
Aubameyang's first international hat-trick for Gabon came against Niger in 2013, where he scored three penalties.

== See also ==
- List of top international men's football goal scorers by country
- Football in Gabon
