= Pierre Aubameyang =

Gabonese footballer (born 1965)

Personal information
- Full name: Pierre-François Aubameyang
- Date of birth: 29 May 1965 (age 61)
- Place of birth: Bitam, Gabon
- Height: 1.78 m (5 ft 10 in)
- Positions: Centre-back; defensive midfielder

Senior career*
Years	Team	Apps	(Gls)
1982–1984	Malakoff	40	(6)
1984–1991	Laval	135	(4)
1991–1994	Le Havre	124	(15)
1994–1995	Toulouse	45	(3)
1995	Libreville	0	(0)
1996	Atlético Junior	1	(0)
1996–1997	Triestina	18	(3)
1997–1998	Nice	28	(1)
2001–2002	Rouen	29	(4)
Total		420	(36)

International career
1985–1998	Gabon	29	(4)
- * Club domestic league appearances and goals

Pierre-François Aubameyang (also spelled Aubame-Eyang; born 29 May 1965) is a Gabonese former professional footballer who played as a centre-back or defensive midfielder. He spent most of his career at French clubs Laval and Le Havre. At international level, he won 29 caps for the Gabon national team. He is the father of Catilina, Willy and Pierre-Emerick.

During his time at Stade Lavallois, Aubameyang became so sick he could not walk. His then-teammate, Franck Leboeuf, claims that the malady was healed by a marabout with black magic after medical doctors could not cure him.

== Post-playing career ==
Aubameyang worked as a scout for A.C. Milan.

In September 2018, he was reported to have become joint managers of the Gabon national team with Daniel Cousin. However, a few days later, his son, Pierre-Emerick, said he had not accepted the position. The Gabonese FA admitted they had made an error, and that Cousin was the sole manager.
