= Willy Aubameyang =

Gabonese footballer (born 1987)

William-Fils Aubameyang
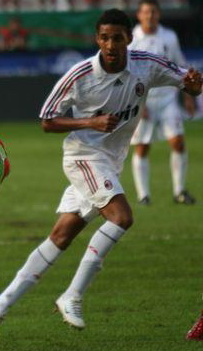
- Aubameyang while playing for A.C. Milan

Personal information
- Full name: William-Fils Aubameyang
- Date of birth: 16 February 1987 (age 39)
- Place of birth: Paris, France
- Height: 1.87 m (6 ft 2 in)
- Position: Defender

Youth career
- –1999: Ivry
- 1999–2002: Créteil-Lusitanos
- 2002–2004: Triestina
- 2004–2007: AC Milan

Senior career*
Years	Team	Apps	(Gls)
2007–2011	AC Milan	0	(0)
2008–2009	→ Avellino (loan)	30	(1)
2009–2010	→ Eupen (loan)	20	(3)
2010–2011	→ Monza (loan)	6	(1)
2011	Kilmarnock	6	(1)
2011–2013	Sapins	0	(0)
2013	Saint-Étienne II	5	(0)
2014–2015	Kray	34	(4)
Total		101	(10)

International career
2009–2015	Gabon	13	(0)
- * Club domestic league appearances and goals

William-Fils "Willy" Aubameyang (born 16 February 1987) is a former professional footballer who played as a defender. Born in France, he is a former Gabon international. He is a half-brother of footballer Pierre-Emerick Aubameyang.

== Club career ==
=== AC Milan ===
Aubameyang was born in Paris, France. He joined AC Milan from Triestina in 2005. Over his first three seasons at the club, he played in their youth teams, though appearing as an unused substitute for the first team in some Serie A and Coppa Italia games, as well as playing several pre-season friendlies (once even scoring against Juventus). On 20 December 2007, he eventually made his official debut in a Coppa Italia match against Catania. He did not appear in the league for Milan.

=== Loan spells ===
Aubameyang spent the following seasons on various loan spells: at Avellino in 2008–09, at Belgian side Eupen in 2009–10, and at Monza in the first half of the 2010–11 season.

=== Kilmarnock ===
In January 2011, he was signed permanently by Scottish Premier League club Kilmarnock, after a successful trial. He scored his first and only goal for the club in a 1–1 league draw against Motherwell. In summer 2011, Aubameyang's short-term contract with Kilmarnock expired and he left the club.

=== FC Kray ===
Aubameyang trialled with Borussia Dortmund II while his brother Pierre-Emerick played for the club's first team but did not earn a contract. Instead he signed for Regionalliga West club FC Kray in November 2014. In January 2016, he did not return from family holidays in Italy to appear for training at FC Kray and left the club which was fighting relegation.

== International career ==
Born in France, Aubameyang chose to play with the Gabonese national jersey, with which he made his debut on 6 June 2009 against Togo in a qualifying match at the 2010 FIFA World Cup, replacing his half-brother Pierre-Emerick Aubameyang at 79th minute.

He was part of the squad that participated in the 2010 Africa Cup of Nations, where he never played.

== Personal life ==
His father Pierre is a former Gabonese international, while his two brothers Catilina and Pierre-Emerick are footballers too and have both played at A.C. Milan like him.
