= Pierre-Emerick Aubameyang =

Gabon international footballer (born 1989)

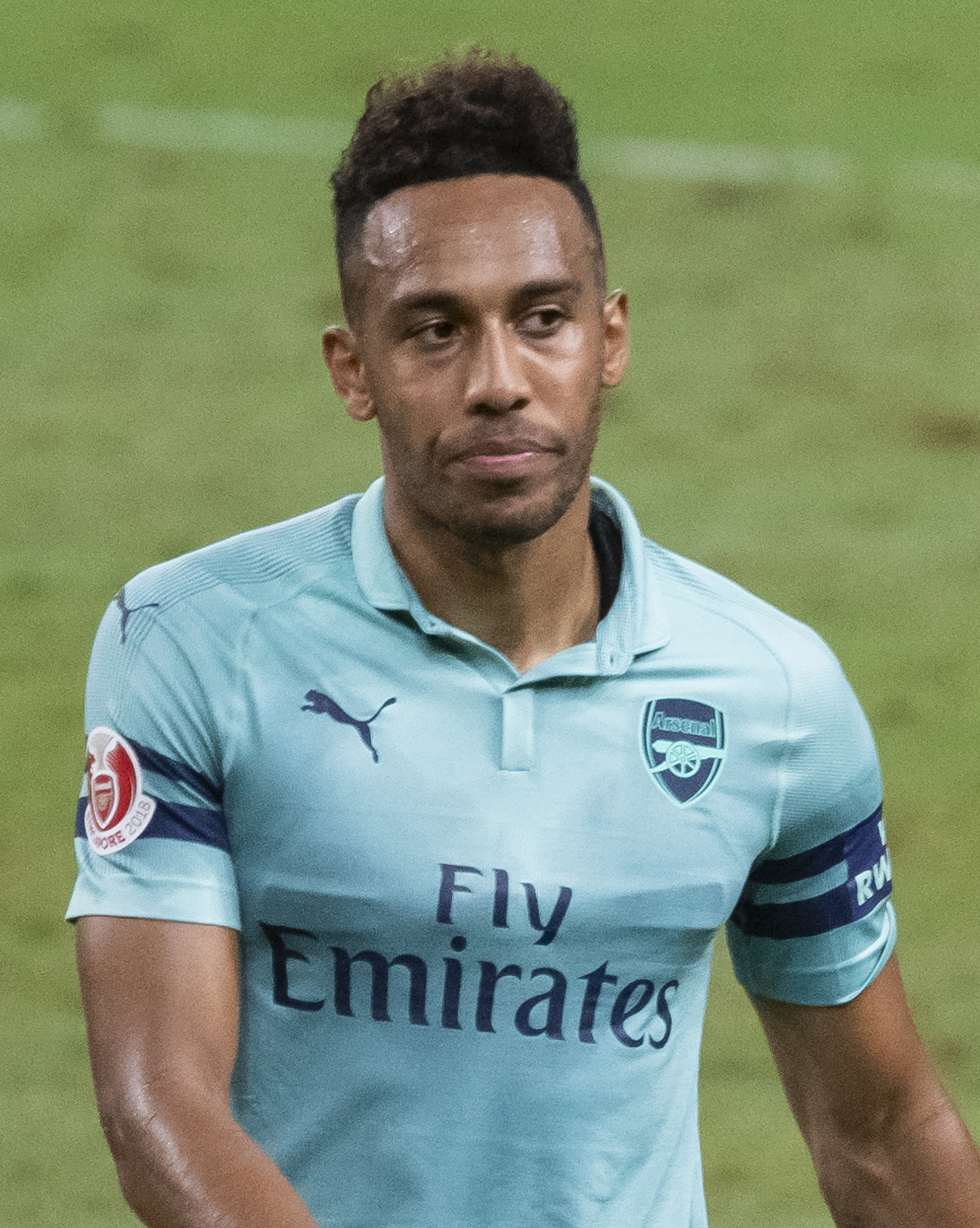
- Aubameyang with Arsenal in 2018

Personal information
- Full name: Pierre-Emerick Emiliano François Aubameyang
- Date of birth: 18 June 1989 (age 37)
- Place of birth: Laval, Mayenne, France
- Height: 1.87 m (6 ft 2 in)
- Position: Striker

Team information
- Current team: Deportivo A Coruña
- Number: 7

Youth career
- 1995–1997: ASL L'Huisserie
- 1997–1998: Nice
- 1998–1999: ASL L'Huisserie
- 1999–2001: Laval
- 2001–2005: Rouen
- 2005–2007: Bastia
- 2007–2008: AC Milan

Senior career*
Years	Team	Apps	(Gls)
2008–2011	AC Milan	0	(0)
2008–2009	→ Dijon (loan)	34	(8)
2009–2010	→ Lille (loan)	14	(2)
2010–2011	→ Monaco (loan)	19	(2)
2011–2013	Saint-Étienne	87	(37)
2011	Saint-Étienne II	2	(0)
2013–2018	Borussia Dortmund	144	(98)
2018–2022	Arsenal	128	(68)
2022	Barcelona	18	(11)
2022–2023	Chelsea	15	(1)
2023–2024	Marseille	34	(17)
2024–2025	Al-Qadsiah	32	(17)
2025–2026	Marseille	30	(10)
2026–	Deportivo A Coruña	10	(5)

International career
2009	France U21	1	(0)
2012	Gabon Olympic	3	(1)
2009–2025	Gabon	86	(40)
- * Club domestic league appearances and goals as of 21:57, 21 November 2026 (UTC)

Pierre-Emerick Emiliano François Aubameyang (born 18 June 1989) is a professional footballer who plays as a striker for La Liga club Deportivo A Coruña. Born in France, he played for the Gabon national team. Aubameyang has scored over 400 goals in his career, is the all-time top scorer in the UEFA Europa League (34), and has the most goals in Europe's top five leagues for an African player, with over 250. He is also the highest-scoring African player in the history of the Bundesliga.

Aubameyang began his senior club career after signing for AC Milan in Italy, but never made an appearance for the club, instead spending several loan spells in France. He transferred permanently to Saint-Étienne in 2011, where he won the 2012–13 Coupe de la Ligue. In summer 2013, he joined Borussia Dortmund, scoring 141 goals in four-and-a-half seasons. While in Germany, he collected the VDV Silver Boot, the Bundesliga's top goalscorer award, and won the DFB-Pokal. His 31 goals in the 2016–17 campaign also made him the first player in 40 years to score 30 goals in a Bundesliga season.

In 2018, Aubameyang joined Arsenal for a then-club record fee of £56 million (€60 million). He went on to captain the club, helping them reach the 2019 Europa League final and win the FA Cup in 2020. Individually, he was awarded the Premier League Golden Boot in 2018–19 and was named in the 2020 PFA Team of the Year. After leaving Arsenal in 2022, he had spells with Barcelona and Chelsea before joining Marseille in 2023, where he was named in the Ligue 1 Team of the Year, while his performances in the Europa League earned him the competition's Player of the Season award. In 2024, he joined Saudi Pro League club Al-Qadsiah, spending one season there before returning to Marseille in 2025. After one season in France, he subsequently returned to Spain, joining Deportivo A Coruña.

After playing once for the France under-21 team, Aubameyang switched to represent Gabon at international level, making his senior debut in 2009 at the age of 19; with 40 goals, he is the nation's all-time top scorer. He represented Gabon at six Africa Cup of Nations tournaments and the 2012 Summer Olympics. In 2015, he was named African Footballer of the Year; the first Gabonese and second European-born player to win the award.

== Club career ==
=== AC Milan ===
Aubameyang joined AC Milan's youth academy in January 2007. In August, he was part of the squad that finished fourth in the inaugural Champions Youth Cup held in Malaysia, where he made a name for himself and attracted the attention of scouts internationally. He scored against every opponent Milan played, finishing with seven goals in six matches.

==== 2008–09: Loan to Dijon ====
For the 2008–09 season, Aubameyang was loaned out to Dijon of Ligue 2 in France to gain first-team experience. His performances there led him to appear in World Soccer's Talent Scout section in the summer of 2009. He finished with a total of ten goals and two assists in all competitions, including two goals in a Coupe de France tie against Selongey.

==== 2009–10: Loan to Lille ====
On 24 June 2009, it was announced Ligue 1 club Lille had decided to sign Aubameyang on loan. Relative to his previous season, however, Aubameyang did not perform as well, scoring just two goals in 14 appearances, four as a starter.

==== 2010–11: Loans to Monaco and Saint-Étienne ====
For the 2010–11 season, Aubameyang was loaned for the season to Monaco. On 21 August 2010, he scored his first goal for Monaco in an away match against Lens, then scored again on 29 August at home to Auxerre, where Monaco won 2–0. In January 2011, after six months with the club, Aubameyang was loaned to Saint-Étienne until the end of the 2010–11 season, finishing the season with four goals and three assists. In July 2011, the loan was extended for the entire 2011–12 season.

=== Saint-Étienne ===
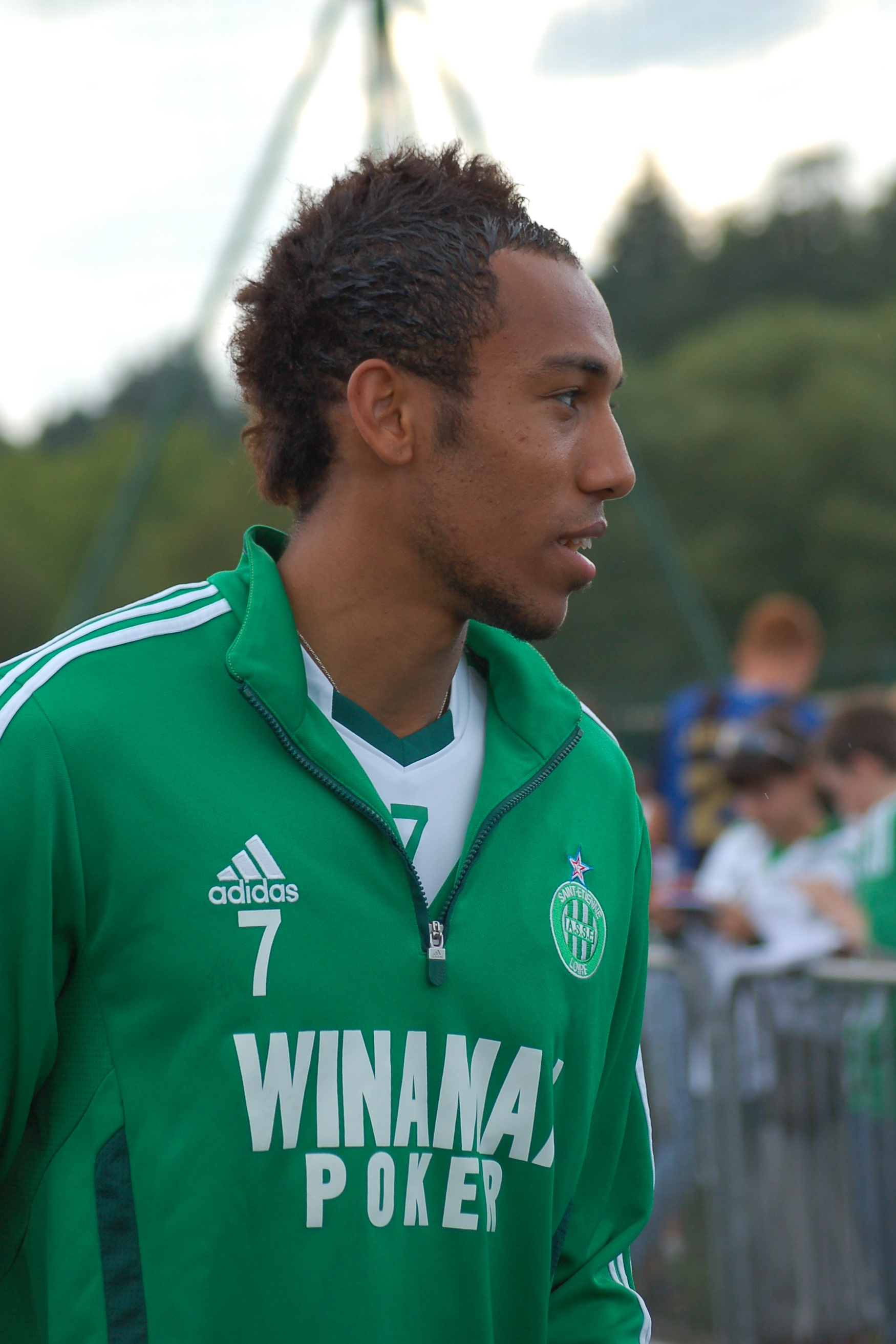
Aubameyang during a training session in August 2011

On 22 December 2011, Aubameyang signed with Saint-Étienne on a permanent deal. He was quickly added to the starting lineup and was given the number 7 jersey. In February 2012, he scored his first hat-trick against Lorient. He became an integral part of the squad, scoring half of the team's away goals during the season, and went on to be Ligue 1's 4th top scorer having scored 16 goals behind Montpellier's Olivier Giroud with 21, PSG's Nenê with 21 too and Lille's Eden Hazard with 20.

On 20 April 2013, Aubameyang was in the starting line-up for Saint-Étienne in the 2013 Coupe de la Ligue Final. Les Verts won the match 1–0 with a goal from Brandão to give Aubameyang his first major trophy as a professional footballer. He finished the season with 18 goals and seven assists in all competitions.

In the 2012–13 season, Aubameyang ended second in the competition's top-goalscorers list, scoring 19 goals and finishing behind only Zlatan Ibrahimović. From his 37 appearances, he also provided eight assists. The season was widely regarded as his breakout year—he appeared in the Ligue 1 team of the season and he won the Ligue 1 African Player of the Year award.

=== Borussia Dortmund ===
==== 2013–15: DFL Supercups ====
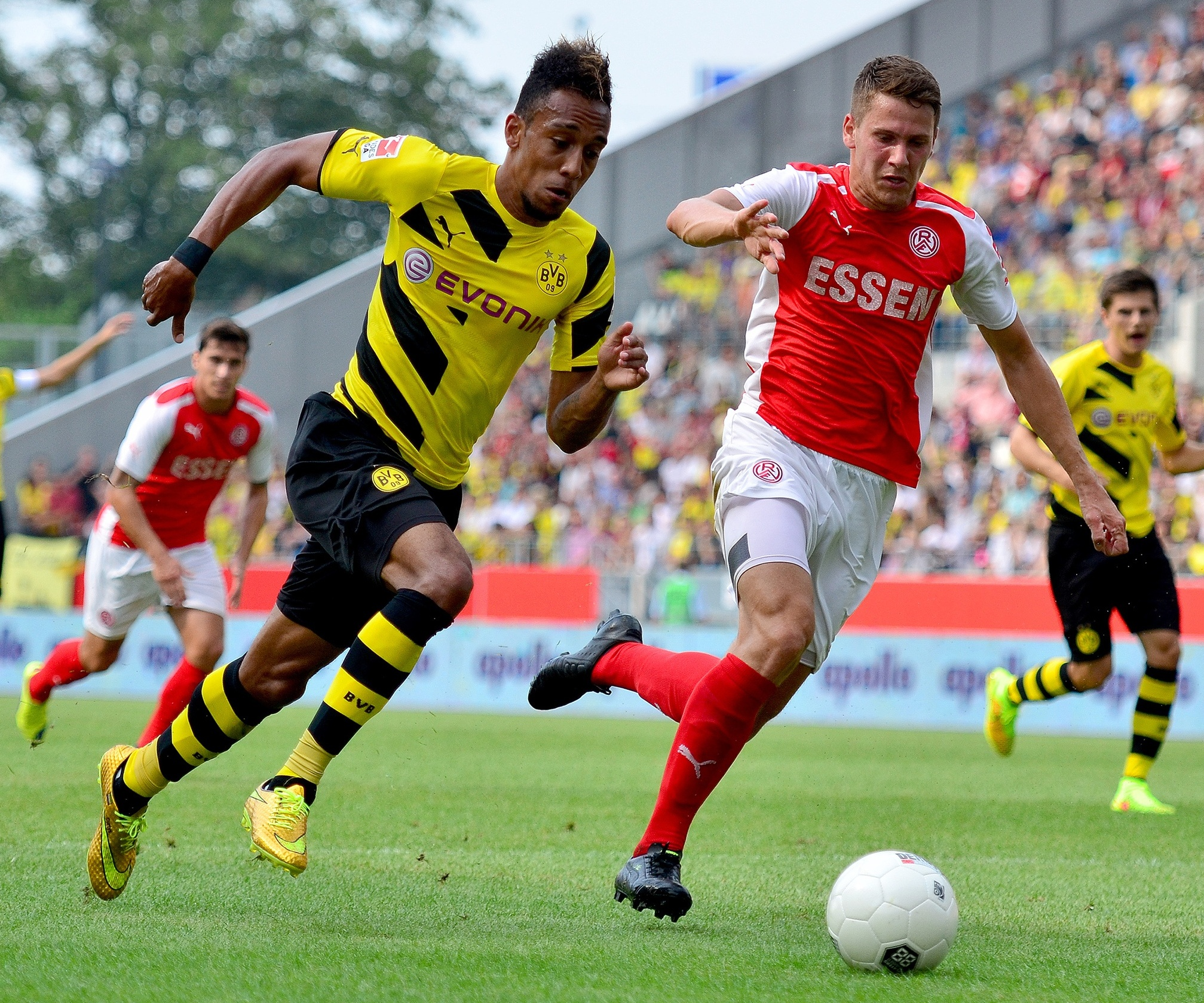
Aubameyang during a pre-season friendly match against Rot-Weiss Essen in August 2014

On 4 July 2013, Aubameyang joined 2012–13 Champions League finalists Borussia Dortmund on a five-year contract. He made his competitive debut for his new club on 27 July 2013 against Bayern Munich in the DFL-Supercup, replacing Jakub Błaszczykowski for the last 18 minutes of Dortmund's 4–2 victory, assisting Dortmund's final goal, scored by Marco Reus. On 10 August, Aubameyang made his Bundesliga debut and scored a hat-trick against FC Augsburg, including a goal from his first shot in the league. In the process, Aubameyang also became the first Gabonese player to appear in the Bundesliga. On 27 November, he scored his first Champions League goal in a 3–1 win against Napoli in the group stage of the 2013–14 competition. He later took a penalty against 1860 Munich that propelled Dortmund into the next round of the 2013–14 DFB-Pokal, finishing the year with 13 league goals and 16 goals in all competitions.

On 13 August 2014, Aubameyang assisted Borussia Dortmund's first goal and scored the second goal in a 2–0 victory over Bayern Munich in the DFL-Supercup. After scoring the goal, he celebrated by putting on a Spider-Man mask. In Dortmund's next match, a 4–1 win over Stuttgarter Kickers in the first round of the DFB-Pokal, Aubameyang scored two second-half goals and provided the assist for Adrián Ramos' goal. On 13 September, Aubameyang scored his first Bundesliga goal of the season, netting Dortmund's final goal of their 3–1 win over SC Freiburg. Three days later, Aubameyang scored Dortmund's second goal in a 2–0 win over future club Arsenal in the first group match of the Champions League.

Aubameyang ended his second season in Dortmund with 25 goals from 46 appearances, including one in the 2015 DFB-Pokal Final, where Dortmund were defeated 3–1 by VfL Wolfsburg at the Olympiastadion.

==== 2015–16: League runner-up ====
On 31 July 2015, Aubameyang signed a new contract to last until 2020, saying, "Every part of me wants to be here and I have never wanted to leave." On 20 August, he scored a brace as Dortmund came from 0–3 down to win 3–4 at Odds BK in the first leg of their Europa League play-off. By scoring in Dortmund's 1–1 draw with 1899 Hoffenheim on 23 September, Aubameyang became the first player in Bundesliga history to score in each of his team's opening six matches of a season. He later extended this record to eight matches, scoring in the team's next two fixtures against Darmstadt 98 and Bayern Munich, before failing to score for the first time in the Bundesliga season in a 2–0 win at Mainz 05.

On 22 October, Aubameyang scored a hat-trick in a UEFA Europa League match against Gabala of Azerbaijan. Three days later, he scored another hat-trick in a 5–1 defeat of Augsburg at the Westfalenstadion. On 8 November, Aubameyang scored the winning goal for Dortmund in a 3–2 Revierderby victory over rivals Schalke 04. At the halfway stage of the Bundesliga season, Aubameyang was the league's top scorer with 18 goals from 17 appearances.

On 30 January 2016, Aubameyang scored his 19th and 20th league goals of the season to give Dortmund a 2–0 home victory over Ingolstadt 04. Aubameyang reached 30 goals in all competitions in a 3–1 victory over VfB Stuttgart in the quarter-final of the 2015–16 DFB-Pokal. In addition to scoring himself, he assisted the side's other two goals scored by Marco Reus and Henrikh Mkhitaryan. On 10 March 2016, Aubameyang scored for Borussia in their 3–0 win over Tottenham Hotspur in the UEFA Europa League Round of 16 first-leg. A week later, he scored both goals in the 2–1 second-leg victory at White Hart Lane, taking him to 35 goals for the season. In scoring two goals in a 5–1 win against VfL Wolfsburg on 30 April, Aubameyang reached 25 goals in the Bundesliga season, thus ending as the league's second-top scorer behind Robert Lewandowski of Bayern Munich.

==== 2016–17: Bundesliga top goalscorer and DFB-Pokal ====
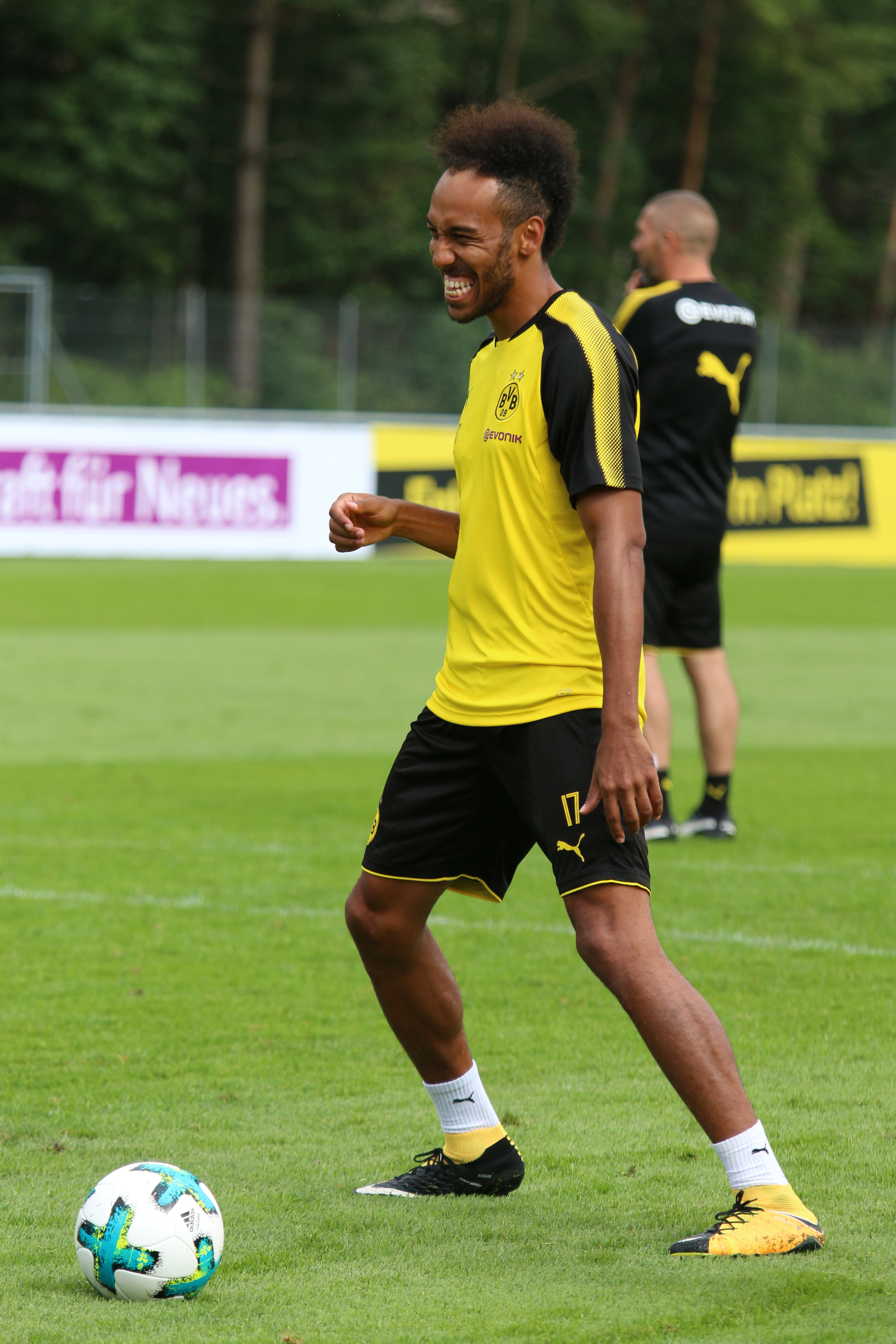
Aubameyang training in July 2017

Aubameyang began his 2016–17 season in the Bundesliga with a double against Mainz 05 on 27 August in a 2–1 victory, while also scoring twice against VfL Wolfsburg on 20 September. Aubameyang scored three days later against recently promoted Freiburg, bringing his season total to five, into a tie atop the scoring charts with Lewandowski early in the season. Following an injury to Marcel Schmelzer, Aubameyang wore the captain's armband for Dortmund for the first time on 22 October, also scoring a goal in the 3–3 draw at Ingolstadt.

Aubameyang also got off to an excellent start in Dortmund's Champions League group stage matches, scoring in each of their first leg matches as Dortmund were joint top of their group with Real Madrid. However, Aubameyang was left out of the squad by Thomas Tuchel for their return leg against Sporting CP on 2 November due to an "internal issue". It turned out that he received a one-game suspension for breaking club rules, by traveling to Milan instead of staying in Dortmund. Expected to return that weekend at Hamburger SV, Aubameyang exploded with a four-goal performance in a 5–2 victory, their first in five tries in the Bundesliga, while also assisting Ousmane Dembélé for Dortmund's final goal.

On 19 November, Aubameyang scored the only goal of a 1–0 win over Bayern Munich at the Westfalenstadion. This was Dortmund's first Klassiker victory in the league since April 2014. On 7 December, Aubameyang scored Borussia's first goal in a 2–2 comeback draw with Real Madrid at the Santiago Bernabéu to secure qualification to the next stage as group winners. On 16 December, Aubameyang scored his 100th goal for Borussia Dortmund in a 2–2 draw away to 1899 Hoffenheim.

On 4 March 2017, Aubameyang passed 20 Bundesliga goals for the second consecutive season with two goals in a 6–2 defeat of Bayer Leverkusen. Four days later, he scored a hat-trick in a 4–0 win over Benfica to put Dortmund into the quarter-finals of the Champions League. On 20 May, Aubameyang scored twice in Borussia's final-day defeat of Werder Bremen to end the season as the Bundesliga's top scorer with 31 goals. In the final of the 2016–17 DFB-Pokal on 27 May 2017, he scored the winning goal, a penalty, as Dortmund beat Eintracht Frankfurt 2–1.

=== Arsenal ===
On 31 January 2018, Aubameyang signed for Premier League club, Arsenal, for a then-club-record fee, reported to be £56 million.

==== 2018–2019: Debut season, Premier League Golden Boot ====
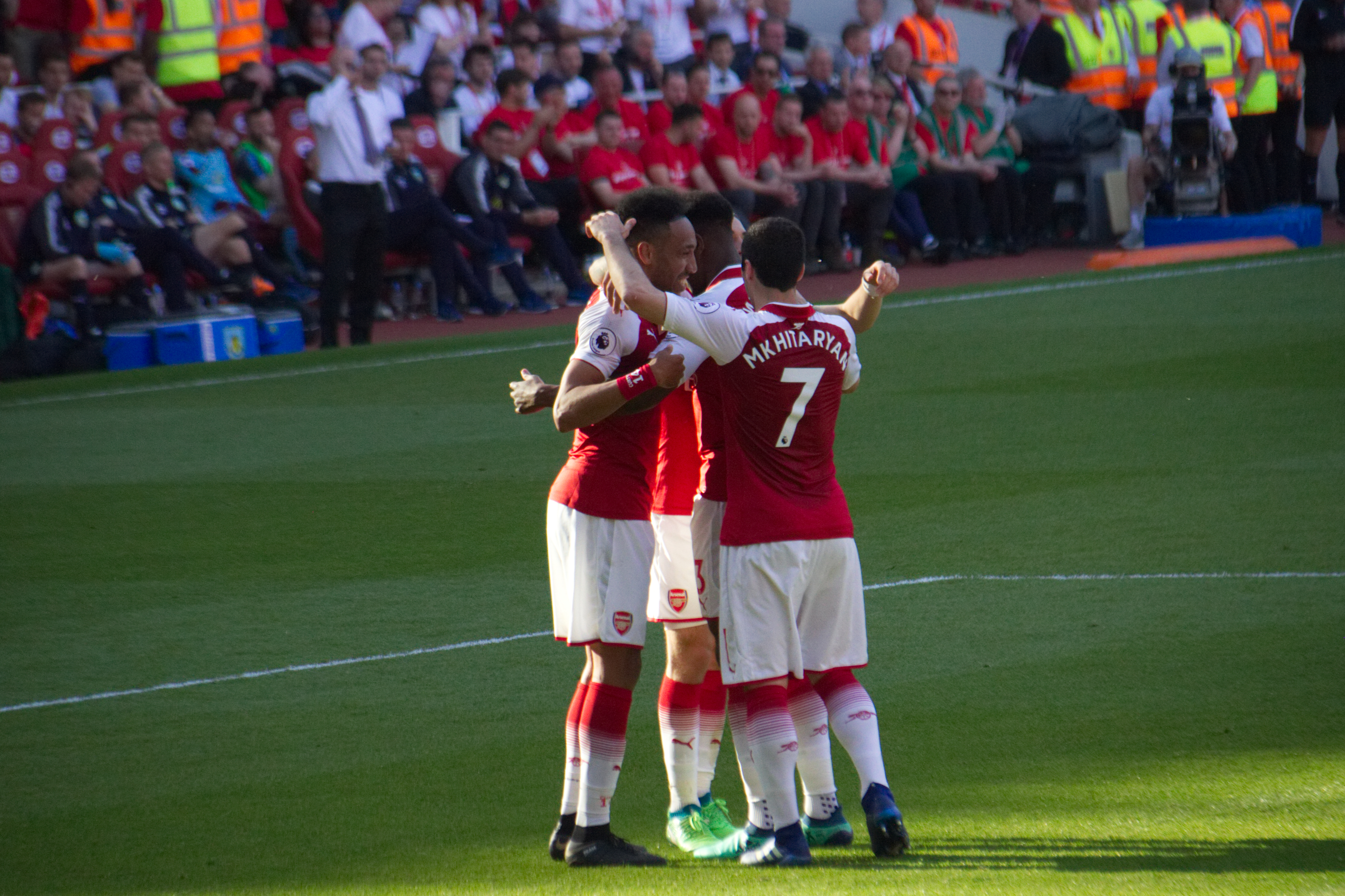
Aubameyang (left) celebrating a goal in the Premier League in May 2018

On 3 February, Aubameyang made his debut for Arsenal against Everton in the Premier League in a 5–1 home victory, scoring the team's fourth goal, chipping the ball over a grounded Jordan Pickford. After missing the Europa League matches against Östersunds for the Gunners due to being cup-tied, Aubameyang registered his first away goal for the club in the team's 2–1 away defeat to Brighton & Hove Albion. Aubameyang registered his first assist for the team, setting up Henrikh Mkhitaryan's goal in a 3–0 win over Watford in which he also scored.

Aubameyang scored twice in a 3–0 home win against Stoke City, making him the first player to score five times in his first six games for the club. He scored twice in manager Arsène Wenger's final home game for the club, opening and closing the scoring, whilst also assisting Alex Iwobi's goal, in a 5–0 win over Burnley. He ended the season with ten goals and four assists in thirteen Premier League games and was the last goalscorer for Arsenal under Arsène Wenger.

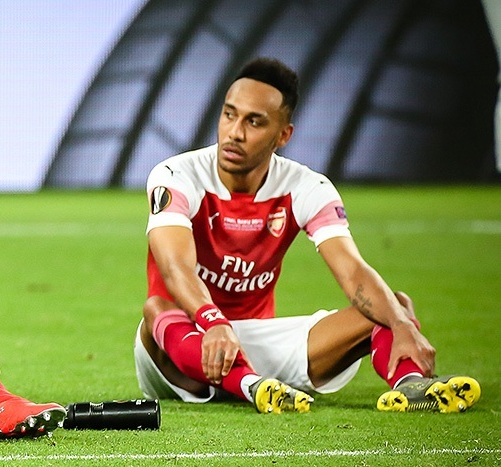
Aubameyang after the 2019 UEFA Europa League final loss in May 2019

Aubameyang scored his first goal of the following season in a 3–2 away win over Cardiff City on 2 September 2018. His strike from outside the box ended his personal run of 76 consecutive goals from inside the box in club football and was also his 150th goal in league football. Aubameyang made his European debut for Arsenal, in the 4–2 home win over Vorskla Poltava, scoring two goals while playing for 57 minutes. By October 2018, Aubameyang had tallied 16 goals in Premier League play since joining Arsenal in February. According to Opta statistics, that gave him a minutes-per-goal ratio of 104.6, which set the record for the best minutes-per-goal ratio in Premier League history (minimum 10 goals).

Aubameyang became the first player to reach 10 goals in the Premier League that season, following a brace in Arsenal's 4–2 victory over Tottenham Hotspur in the North London derby on 2 December. He also assisted a goal as Arsenal rose above Tottenham in the Premier League on goal difference. He scored his first Arsenal hat-trick in a 4–2 win over Valencia on 9 May 2019 as the club reached the Europa League final. He was the first Arsenal player to score a hat-trick in the semi-finals of a European competition.

Aubameyang finished the season with two goals in a 3–1 away win at Burnley, meaning he ended the season sharing the Premier League Golden Boot title with Liverpool's Mohamed Salah and Sadio Mané, on 22 goals. He played the full 90 minutes in Arsenal's 4–1 defeat to Chelsea in the Europa League, failing to make a significant impact as the result meant Arsenal missed out on Champions League qualification.

==== 2019–2022: FA Cup win and departure ====
On 11 August 2019, Aubameyang scored his and Arsenal's first goal of the season in their 1–0 opening match victory over Newcastle United at St James' Park, in which he demonstrated perfect technique to cushion a cross from Ainsley Maitland-Niles, to slot the ball past Martin Dúbravka, with José Mourinho hailing the strike as "a moment of genius". Aubameyang scored his first home goal of the campaign in Arsenal's next game, a 2–1 win over Burnley on 17 August. He scored his first European goal of the season on 19 September against Eintracht Frankfurt in the Europa League, as Arsenal won 3–0 away from home on matchday 1.

Aubameyang's five goals in September, including equalizers against Tottenham and Manchester United and the winner against Aston Villa, saw him named the Premier League Player of the Month. On 5 November 2019, after Granit Xhaka was stripped of the Arsenal captaincy following his angry reaction to getting booed by the Arsenal supporters during their Premier League game against Crystal Palace, head coach Unai Emery confirmed that Aubameyang would take over as the new Arsenal captain.

On 1 December, following the dismissal of Emery, Aubameyang scored both goals in Arsenal's 2–2 draw with Norwich City under interim head coach Freddie Ljungberg. Aubameyang's first goal (a penalty) had to be retaken, after VAR discovered there to be encroachment in the penalty area. Aubameyang's first effort was kept out by goalkeeper Tim Krul, however, his second effort (the same side as his previous attempt), was successfully converted.

Aubameyang scored in Arsenal's 1–1 draw with Crystal Palace on 11 January 2020, but was also sent off for a late challenge on Palace midfielder Max Meyer. Aubameyang was originally given a yellow card for the tackle by referee Paul Tierney, however, the card was eventually upgraded to a red card, by the VAR, resulting in Aubameyang's first-ever red card for the Gunners and would mean that the striker would miss Arsenal's next three matches against Sheffield United, Chelsea, and Arsenal's FA Cup tie against Bournemouth.

On 27 February, in Arsenal's Europa League second leg round of 32 match against Olympiacos and with the aggregate score tied at 1–1, Aubameyang's scissor kick goal in extra time allowed his side to equalize the match and lead the tie on aggregate. However, following a 119th-minute goal by Olympiacos that meant Arsenal would be heading out of the competition, Aubameyang missed an open shot from five yards out in the last seconds of the match that would have seen his side through. Following Arsenal's elimination, Aubameyang apologized for and lamented his miss, stating, "I feel very, very bad. It can happen but I do not know how I missed this chance. I was tired, I had some cramps but it is not an excuse."

Following the resumption of the league in the wake of the COVID-19 pandemic, Aubameyang did not score or assist in the first three Premier League games after the restart for Arsenal, but eventually netted a brace on 1 July against Norwich City in a 4–0 rout. Aubameyang's first goal was his 50th in the league for Arsenal, making him the quickest player to reach 50 goals for the club in the Premier League era, having achieved the feat in just 79 league appearances, four games quicker than all-time club goalscorer Thierry Henry, and also became the sixth fastest to 50 in the Premier League, behind Andy Cole, Alan Shearer, Ruud van Nistelrooy, Fernando Torres and Mohamed Salah. Aubameyang also assisted the Gunners' second goal, which was scored by Granit Xhaka. He ended the season with 22 league goals, one behind Jamie Vardy, the winner of the Golden Boot, and tied with Danny Ings for second place.

On 18 July, in their FA Cup semi-final against defending champions Manchester City, Aubameyang scored both goals in a 2–0 win for Arsenal, sending them to the final. On 1 August, he converted a penalty and scored the winner in the final, as Arsenal defeated Chelsea 2–1 and Aubameyang lifted his first trophy with the club, becoming the first African to win the FA Cup as a captain.

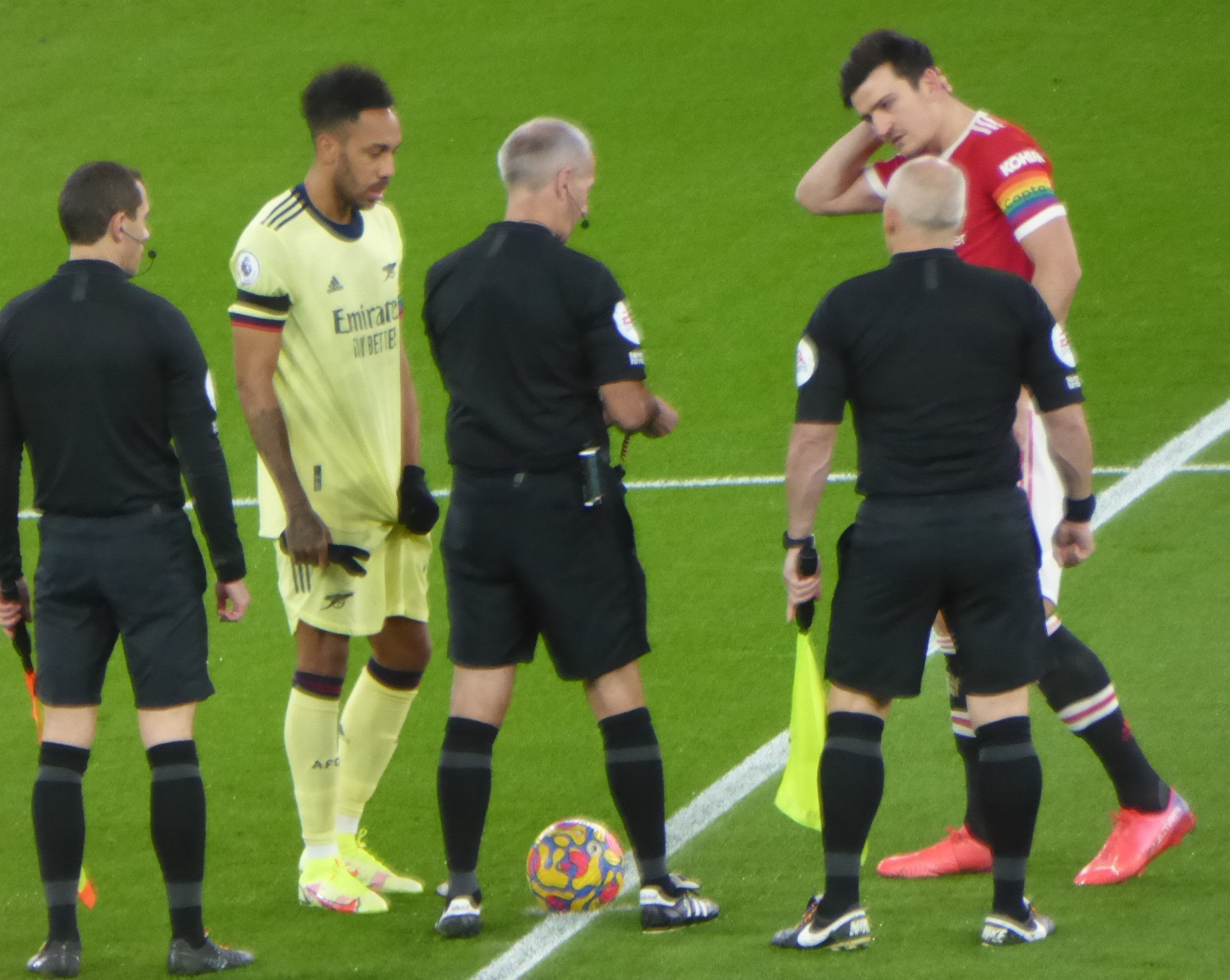
Aubameyang (left) ahead of a Premier League match against Manchester United in December 2021

On 29 August 2020, Aubameyang scored a goal in normal time and the fifth and winning penalty in a shoot-out win against Liverpool in the Community Shield, after the game ended 1–1. On 12 September, he scored in the first league game of the new season the final goal of a 3–0 win away to Fulham. On 15 September, Aubameyang signed a new three-year contract with Arsenal. On 1 November, he scored a penalty in a 1–0 away win against Manchester United, to grant Arsenal their first Premier League win at Old Trafford since 2006.

Aubameyang scored two goals for Arsenal in their 3–0 victory over Newcastle United on 18 January 2021. However, he did not play in the club's next three matches, in order to tend to his ill mother. On 14 February, Aubameyang scored his first Premier League hat-trick in a 4–2 win over Leeds United. This took him to 200 career goals across Europe's top five leagues. On 25 February, he scored two goals against Benfica in a 3–2 win to secure a place in the Europa League round of 16. On 14 March, Aubameyang was left out of the starting lineup in the North London Derby against Tottenham, the manager citing disciplinary reasons.

On matchday 16 of the 2021–22 season, Aubameyang was omitted from the squad for Arsenal's match against Southampton, with manager Mikel Arteta yet again citing disciplinary reasons. Three days later, Aubameyang was stripped of the captaincy. On 1 February 2022, Arsenal announced Aubameyang's departure from the club by mutual consent.

=== Barcelona ===
On 2 February 2022, Barcelona reached an agreement for Aubameyang to join the club. Aubameyang signed a contract until 30 June 2025 with an option to agree departure on 30 June 2023. Aubameyang made his debut for Barcelona on 6 February 2022, coming on as a substitute in a 4–2 win over Atlético Madrid. On 20 February, he scored his first competitive goals in his fourth match for Barcelona, scoring a hat-trick in a 4–1 away win at the Mestalla over Valencia in a man-of-the-match performance. On 20 March, Aubameyang scored a brace and assisted Ferran Torres in his only El Clásico helping Barcelona to a 4–0 away victory against the league leaders.

On 14 May 2023, Barcelona beat Espanyol in a 4–2 win to secure the 2022–23 La Liga title, meaning Aubameyang claimed the first league title in his career, despite playing just nine minutes for Barcelona before joining Chelsea in the summer of 2022.

=== Chelsea ===
On 2 September 2022, Chelsea announced the signing of Aubameyang to join the club on a two-year contract. Barcelona confirmed the fee was €12 million (£10.3 million). Aubameyang made his Chelsea debut on 6 September, after being named a starter in a 1–0 Champions League defeat to Dinamo Zagreb. On 1 October, he made his league debut for the club and scored his first goal in a 2–1 away win against Crystal Palace.

In the Champions League group stage, he scored two goals in two matches against his former club AC Milan. However, he was later excluded from the 25-man Champions League squad for the knockout stages by coach Graham Potter.

=== Marseille ===
On 21 July 2023, Aubameyang left Chelsea and signed a three-year deal with Marseille. On 12 August, he made his debut coming on as a substitute in the 67th minute in a 2–1 win against Reims. Three days later, he scored a brace against Panathinaikos in the Champions League third qualifying round which gave his team a 2–0 lead; however, Marseille conceded a penalty in the stoppage time which equaled the tie 2–2, before losing 3–5 on penalties to be eliminated from the competition.

In December 2023, Aubameyang scored four goals and provided four assists, leading Marseille to a five-match unbeaten run, earning him the Ligue 1 Player of the Month award. On 22 February, Aubameyang became the top goal scorer in the history of the UEFA Europa League with 31 goals after scoring against Shakhtar Donetsk in a 3–1 victory, surpassing Radamel Falcao, with whom he was level at 30 goals.

=== Al-Qadsiah ===
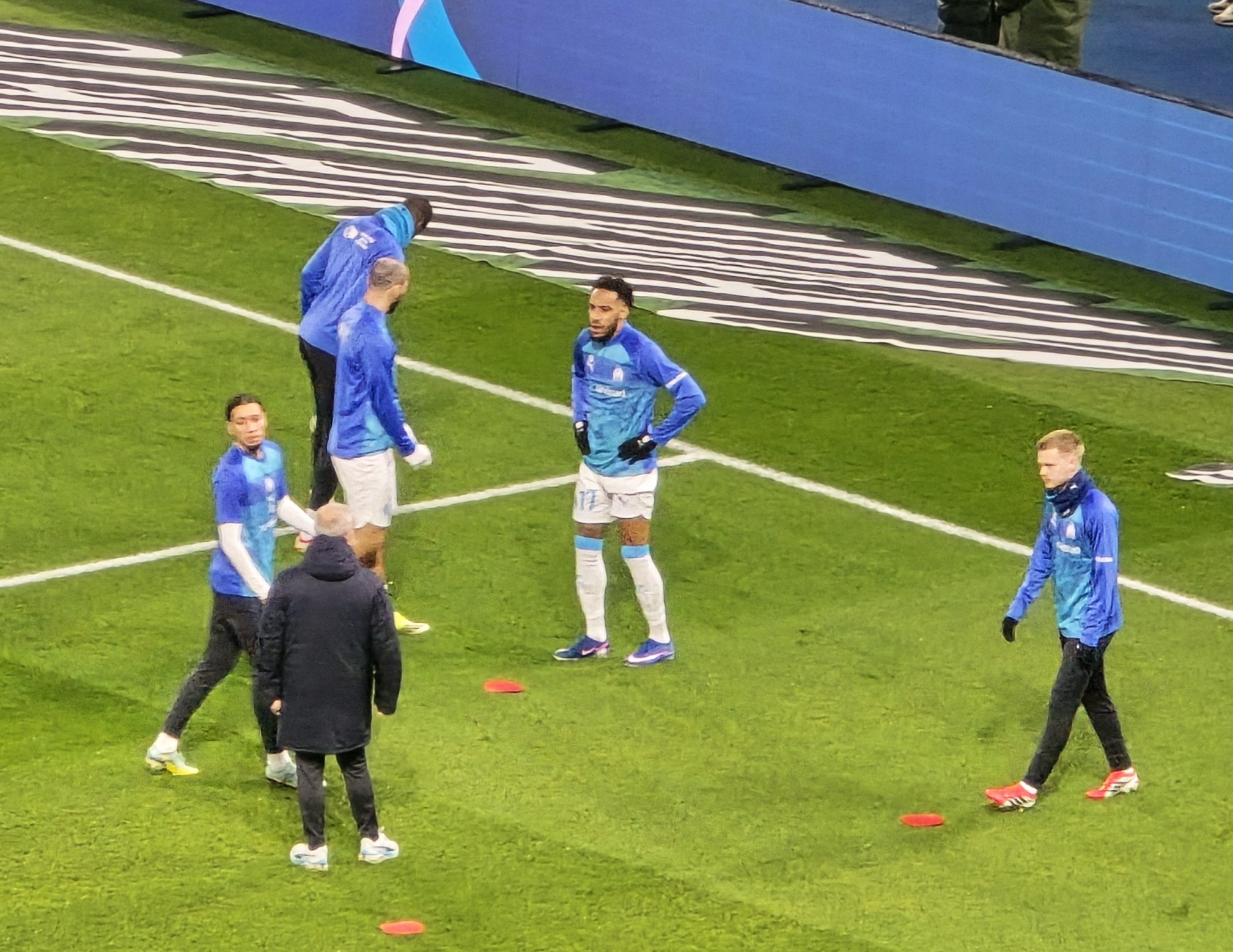
Aubameyang (middle) warming up ahead of a Ligue 1 match against Paris Saint-Germain in February 2016

On 18 July 2024, newly promoted Saudi Pro League club Al-Qadsiah confirmed the signing of Aubameyang on a two-year contract. He left the club a year later on 17 July 2025, after spending a single season at the club and notably scoring 17 league goals.

=== Return to Marseille ===
On 31 July 2025, Aubameyang returned to Marseille on a free transfer on a two-year contract. He was dropped from the squad for the final match of the season after a training ground disturbance that saw the club's Sporting Coordinator Bob Tahri sprayed with a fire extinguisher by Aubameyang, who later apologised for his role in the incident.

=== Deportivo A Coruña ===
On 17 July 2026, Aubameyang returned to La Liga, signing for newly-promoted Deportivo de A Coruña on a contract until 2028. A month later, on 17 August, he scored his first goal on his debut in a 1–1 draw with Elche.

== International career ==
Aubameyang was invited to play for Italy U19s after a good season with Dijon, but he debuted for the France under-21 team in February 2009 in a friendly match against Tunisia U21.

Aubameyang was also eligible to play for Spain because he has Spanish nationality. He decided to represent Gabon because his father once captained the team, but he maintains a close relationship with Spain and expressed a desire to play in La Liga prior to signing for Barcelona.

On 25 March 2009, Aubameyang was selected for the Gabon national team and made his debut for the squad. He scored his first goal in a 2–1 victory over Morocco, then scored a goal each in friendly matches against Benin, Togo, Algeria and Senegal.

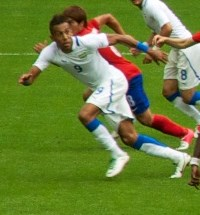
Aubameyang playing for Gabon at the 2012 Summer Olympics

Aubameyang was a key member of the Gabon national side that reached the quarter-finals of the 2012 Africa Cup of Nations as co-hosts of the competition. He netted three goals in total, finishing the tournament as one of the top scorers. On 5 February 2012, he set up the opening goal for his team and hit the post in the quarter-final against Mali. However, the match ended 1–1 after extra time and Aubameyang had his penalty saved in the shootout to decide the game.

In July 2012, Aubameyang represented Gabon at the 2012 Summer Olympics in London. He scored in the team's opening game against Switzerland, which was Gabon's first-ever Olympic goal, and would also prove to be Gabon's only goal of the tournament. They were eliminated in the group stage.

On 15 June 2013, Aubameyang scored a hat-trick of penalty kicks in Gabon's 4–1 2014 FIFA World Cup qualifying win over Niger. He then scored a brace against Burkina Faso in the 2015 Africa Cup of Nations Qualification.

Aubameyang captained Gabon at the 2015 Africa Cup of Nations, scoring the team's opening goal of the tournament in their 2–0 win over Burkina Faso on 17 January 2015. He rejected a callup for a pivotal World Cup qualifier at home to the Ivory Coast in August 2017, and they lost 3–0.

On 25 March 2021, Aubameyang captained Gabon to a 3–0 win at home to DR Congo, scoring the third goal to ensure qualification to the African Cup of Nations to be staged in Cameroon. At that time, he contracted malaria, in which he got a fever and had to be hospitalized.

Aubameyang tested positive for COVID-19 before Gabon's first game in the African Cup of Nations. He withdrew from the tournament a few days later to undergo further medical examinations in England after being diagnosed with heart lesions.

On 18 May 2022, Aubameyang announced his retirement from international football. He made a total of 72 appearances for the Gabon national team and scored 30 goals. However, a year later, he announced he had changed his mind and would return to the national side. He said his decision had been prompted by a meeting with President Ali Bongo.

Following a group stage exit at the 2025 Africa Cup of Nations where Gabon lost all three matches, the Gabonese government decided to suspend the national team. Additionally, Gabon's sports minister Simplice-Desire Mamboula sacked head coach Thierry Mouyouma and banned both Aubameyang and team captain Bruno Ecuele Manga. However, the suspension was lifted shortly after by new sports minister Paul Ulrich Kessany. On 2 September 2026, Aubameyang announced his retirement from international football, citing the "humiliation" from the sports minister as a key reason for his decision.

== Style of play ==
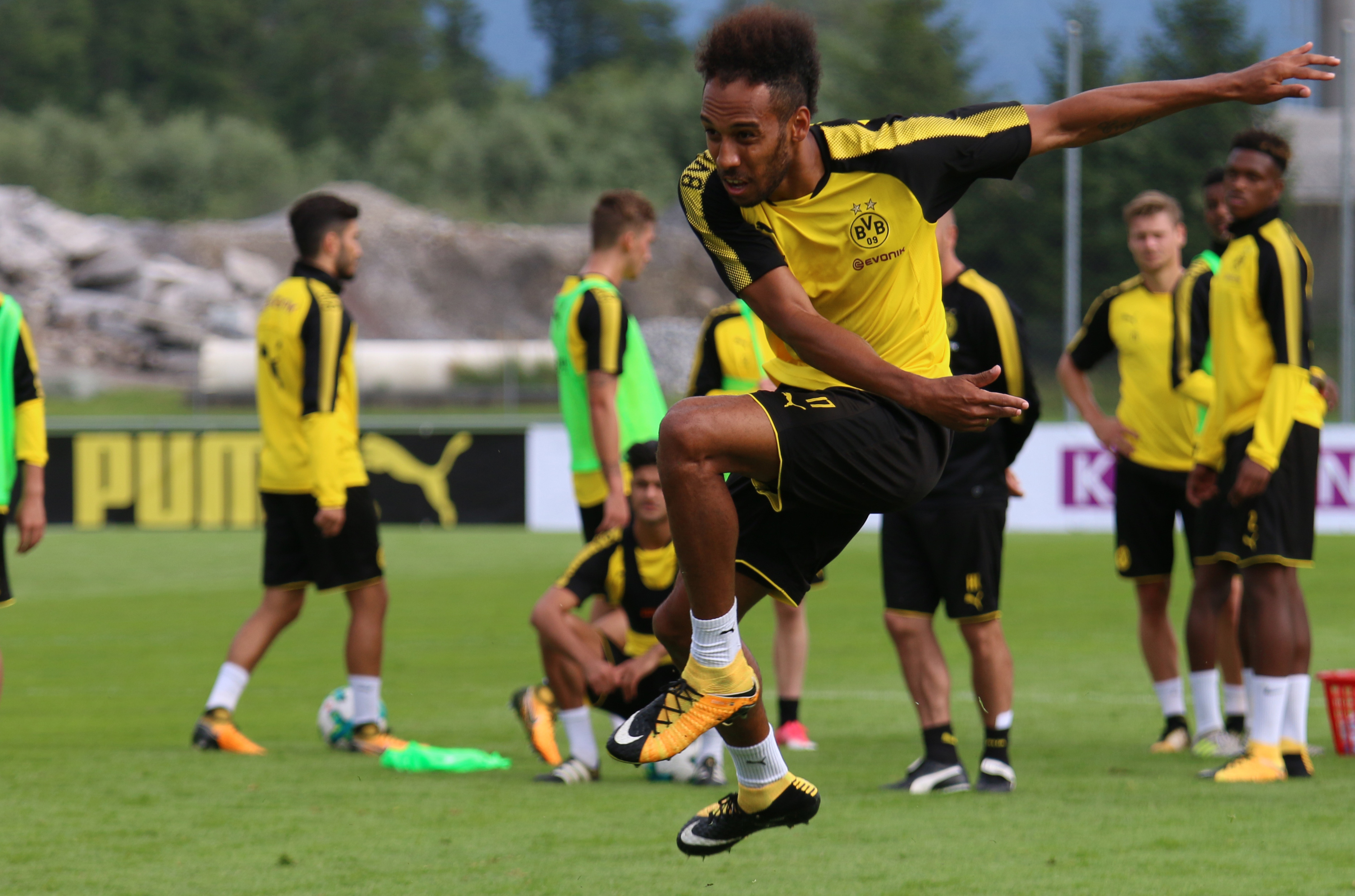
Aubameyang striking the ball in a training session with Dortmund in 2017

Aubameyang is primarily a striker, although he has also played as a winger, particularly on the left. His main assets are his pace, movement, and finishing. Initially deployed on the wing by Jürgen Klopp at Dortmund, a position he occupied at Saint-Étienne, Aubameyang gradually transitioned into a more central role following the departure of striker Lewandowski in 2014. Klopp later described him as a "really good central striker" who developed into a "goal machine", highlighting his combination of speed and finishing.

Aubameyang was regarded as one of the best strikers in the world during his prime years at Dortmund and Arsenal. Gary Neville hailed Aubameyang as "world class" in February 2020. Antoine Griezmann was of similar praise as well: "He is definitely a world class striker who has an incredible consistency in his game". According to Klopp, Aubameyang is "one of the best players for the counterattack because of the timing of the runs and his really outstanding finishing.” His former Dortmund teammate Reus said, "You can always find 'Auba' on the pitch. I rate his running highly. Maybe things don't always work out, but if we get it even a bit right, we create very dangerous situations."

In November 2018, The Guardian was of high praise for him in light of his goalscoring rate since arriving at Arsenal:

"Aubameyang did it in France with St-Étienne, when he was Ligue 1’s second-top scorer in 2012-13 with 19 [...] He did it in Germany with Dortmund, when he was the Bundesliga’s top scorer in 2016-17 with 31 [...] Now he is doing it in England. How many other strikers can say they have delivered in three of Europe’s major leagues?"

Aubameyang credits former African strikers Samuel Eto'o and Didier Drogba as his main influences. He also has a tattoo on his arm dedicated to former Argentina striker Hernán Crespo that reads 'Crespo for life'.

== Media ==
Aubameyang was involved in the Amazon Original sports docuseries All or Nothing: Arsenal, which documented Arsenal by spending time with the coaching staff and players behind the scenes both on and off the field throughout their 2021–22 season.

Produced by Fulwell 73, FIFA released Captains in 2022, an eight-part sports docuseries following six national team captains in their respective 2022 FIFA World Cup qualification campaigns. Aubameyang, representing Gabon, starred alongside Thiago Silva (Brazil), Luka Modrić (Croatia), Andre Blake (Jamaica), Hassan Maatouk (Lebanon) and Brian Kaltak (Vanuatu). It was released by Netflix and also shown on FIFA's own streaming platform, FIFA+.

== Personal life ==
Aubameyang was born in Laval, Mayenne, France. He is the son of former Gabonese international footballer Pierre Aubameyang and younger half-brother of Catilina and Willy, who have both played for Milan's youth teams. His mother is Spanish. He is married to Alysha Behague, the couple have two sons, Curtys and Pierre. In August 2022, Aubameyang suffered a broken jaw during a violent robbery of his home in Barcelona.

He is multilingual, speaking French, English, Spanish, Italian, and German.

He raced alongside Lando Norris for McLaren in 2020 Virtual F1 Monaco Grand Prix.

== Career statistics ==
=== Club ===
As of match played 21 November 2026

Appearances and goals by club, season and competition
Club	Season	League			National cup (Note: Includes Coupe de France, DFB-Pokal, FA Cup, King's Cup)		League cup (Note: Includes Coupe de la Ligue, EFL Cup)		Continental		Other		Total	
Club	Season	Division	Apps	Goals	Apps	Goals	Apps	Goals	Apps	Goals	Apps	Goals	Apps	Goals
AC Milan	2007–08	Serie A	0	0	0	0	—		0	0	0	0	0	0
Dijon (loan)	2008–09	Ligue 2	34	8	4	2	1	0	—		—		39	10
Lille (loan)	2009–10	Ligue 1	14	2	0	0	1	0	9 (Note: Appearances in UEFA Europa League)	0	—		24	2
Monaco (loan)	2010–11	Ligue 1	19	2	1	0	3	0	—		—		23	2
Saint-Étienne II	2010–11	CFA	2	0	—		—		—		—		2	0
Saint-Étienne	2010–11	Ligue 1	14	2	—		—		—		—		14	2
Saint-Étienne	2011–12	Ligue 1	36	16	0	0	2	2	—		—		38	18
Saint-Étienne	2012–13	Ligue 1	37	19	4	2	4	0	—		—		45	21
Saint-Étienne	Total		87	37	4	2	6	2	—		—		97	41
Borussia Dortmund	2013–14	Bundesliga	32	13	6	2	—		9 (Note: Appearances in UEFA Champions League)	1	1 (Note: Appearance in DFL-Supercup)	0	48	16
Borussia Dortmund	2014–15	Bundesliga	33	16	4	5	—		8	3	1	1	46	25
Borussia Dortmund	2015–16	Bundesliga	31	25	4	3	—		14	11	—		49	39
Borussia Dortmund	2016–17	Bundesliga	32	31	4	2	—		9	7	1	0	46	40
Borussia Dortmund	2017–18	Bundesliga	16	13	1	3	—		6	4	1	1	24	21
Borussia Dortmund	Total		144	98	19	15	—		46	26	4	2	213	141
Arsenal	2017–18	Premier League	13	10	—		1	0	0	0	—		14	10
Arsenal	2018–19	Premier League	36	22	1	1	2	0	12	8	—		51	31
Arsenal	2019–20	Premier League	36	22	2	4	0	0	6	3	—		44	29
Arsenal	2020–21	Premier League	29	10	1	1	0	0	8	3	1 (Note: Appearance in FA Community Shield)	1	39	15
Arsenal	2021–22	Premier League	14	4	0	0	1	3	—		—		15	7
Arsenal	Total		128	68	4	6	4	3	26	14	1	1	163	92
Barcelona	2021–22	La Liga	17	11	—		—		6	2	—		23	13
Barcelona	2022–23	La Liga	1	0	—		—		—		—		1	0
Barcelona	Total		18	11	—		—		6	2	—		24	13
Chelsea	2022–23	Premier League	15	1	0	0	0	0	6	2	—		21	3
Marseille	2023–24	Ligue 1	34	17	2	1	—		15 (Note: Two appearances and two goals in UEFA Champions League, thirteen appearances and ten goals in UEFA Europa League)	12	—		51	30
Al-Qadsiah	2024–25	Saudi Pro League	32	17	4	4	—		—		—		36	21
Marseille	2025–26	Ligue 1	30	10	2	1	—		8	3	1 (Note: Appearance in Trophée des Champions)	0	41	14
Deportivo A Coruña	2026–27	La Liga	10	5	0	0	—		—		—		10	5
Career total			568	276	40	31	15	5	116	59	6	3	745	374

=== International ===
Appearances and goals by national team and year
National team	Year	Apps	Goals
Gabon	2009	7	2
Gabon	2010	10	3
Gabon	2011	5	0
Gabon	2012	8	4
Gabon	2013	4	3
Gabon	2014	4	2
Gabon	2015	10	5
Gabon	2016	4	2
Gabon	2017	4	2
Gabon	2018	2	1
Gabon	2019	5	1
Gabon	2020	2	1
Gabon	2021	6	3
Gabon	2022	2	1
Gabon	2023	2	0
Gabon	2024	5	3
Gabon	2025	6	7
Total		86	40

== Honours ==
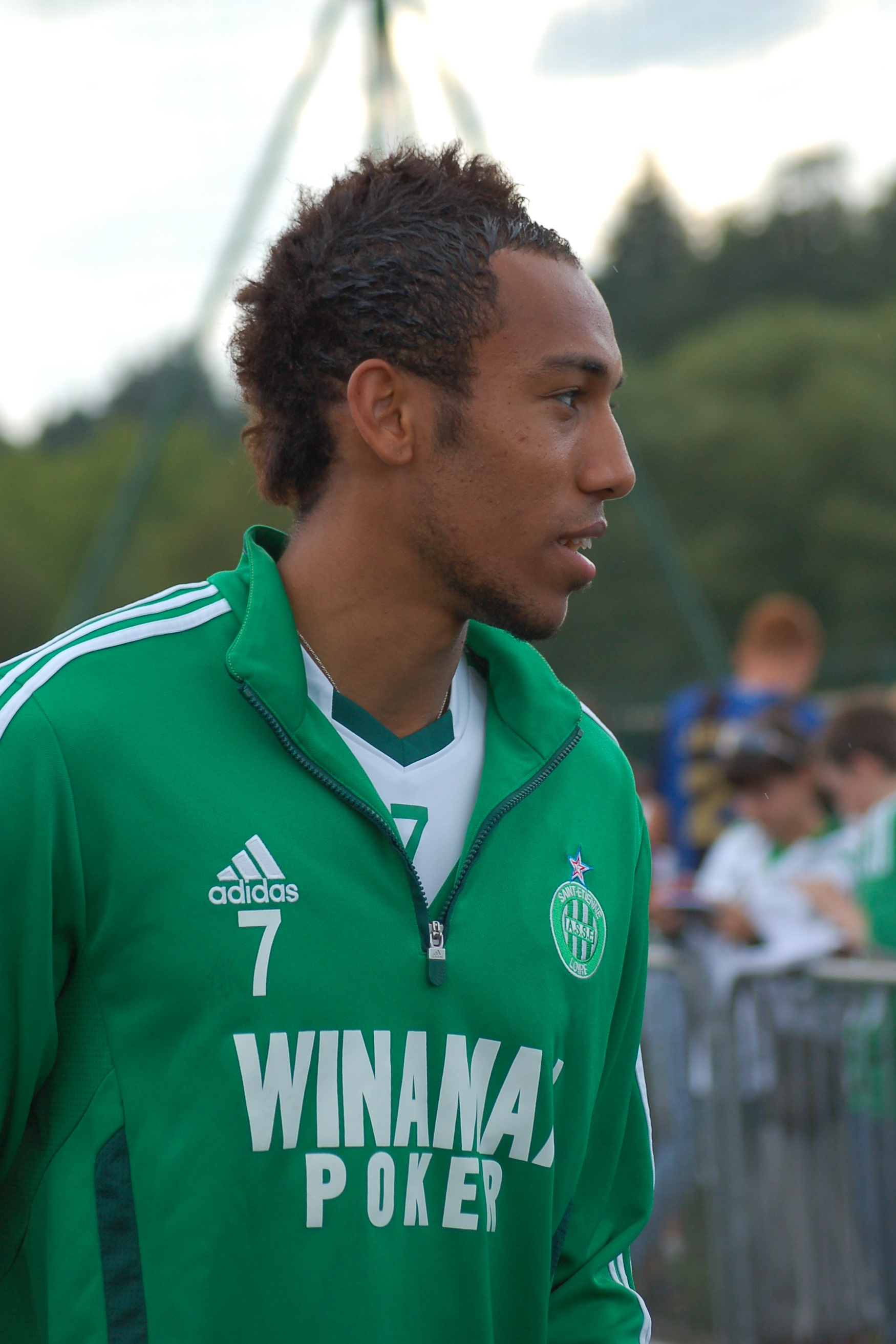
Aubameyang with Saint-Étienne in 2011

Saint-Étienne

- Coupe de la Ligue: 2012–13

Borussia Dortmund

- DFB-Pokal: 2016–17; runner-up: 2013–14, 2014–15, 2015–16
- DFL-Supercup: 2013, 2014

Arsenal

- FA Cup: 2019–20
- FA Community Shield: 2020
- EFL Cup runner-up: 2017–18
- UEFA Europa League runner-up: 2018–19

Barcelona

- La Liga: 2022–23

Al-Qadsiah

- King's Cup runner-up: 2024–25

Individual

- African Footballer of the Year: 2015
- Prix Marc-Vivien Foé: 2012–13, 2023–24
- UNFP Ligue 1 Team of the Year: 2012–13, 2023–24
- UNFP Ligue 1 African Player of the Year: 2012–13
- UNFP Ligue 1 Player of the Month: February 2012, October 2012, February 2013, December 2023
- CAF Team of the Year: 2013, 2014, 2015, 2016, 2018, 2019
- UEFA Europa League top scorer: 2023–24
- UEFA Europa League Player of the Season: 2023–24
- UEFA Europa League Squad of the Season: 2015–16, 2018–19, 2023–24
- VDV Player of the Season (Silver Boot): 2015–16
- VDV Team of the Season: 2015–16
- DW Bundesliga's Best Player: 2016
- Der Spiegel Best Player in the Bundesliga (winter period): 2016–17
- Bundesliga top scorer: 2016–17
- Bundesliga Team of the Season: 2016–17
- Premier League Golden Boot: 2018–19 (shared)
- Premier League Player of the Month: October 2018, September 2019
- Goal Bundesliga Team of the Decade: 2019
- PFA Team of the Year: 2019–20 Premier League
- IFFHS CAF Men Team of The Year: 2020
- IFFHS CAF Men's Team of the Decade 2011–2020
- Borussia Dortmund Player of the Season: 2014–15
- Arsenal Player of the Season: 2019–20
- Marseille Player of the Season: 2023–24
- Sports Illustrated The Best Strikers in the History of Arsenal (#6): 2025

Orders

- Commander of the National Order of Merit of Gabon: 2016

== See also ==
- List of top international men's football goal scorers by country
