= Catilina Aubameyang =

Gabonese footballer (born 1983)

Personal information
- Date of birth: 1 September 1983 (age 43)
- Place of birth: Libreville, Gabon
- Height: 1.70 m (5 ft 7 in)
- Position: Left winger

Youth career
- 1998–2000: Reggiana
- 2000–2002: AC Milan

Senior career*
Years	Team	Apps	(Gls)
2002–2006	AC Milan	1	(0)
2003–2004	→ Triestina (loan)	11	(0)
2004	→ Rimini (loan)	4	(0)
2005	→ Ancona (loan)	12	(0)
2005	→ Lugano (loan)	10	(0)
2006	→ Chiasso (loan)	10	(0)
2006	105 Libreville	33	(1)
2007	Paris FC	11	(1)
2007–2009	Ajaccio	27	(0)
2010–2011	Gazélec Ajaccio	7	(0)
2011–2013	Sapins		
2013	ASD Verbano Calcio		
2013–2014	UC Cairate		
2014	FC Tradate		
2014–2015	Mozzate Calcio 1923		
2015–2017	FC Fagnano Olano		

International career
2001	France U19	2	(0)
2004	France U21	1	(0)
2004–2010	Gabon	9	(1)
- * Club domestic league appearances and goals

Catilina Aubameyang (born 1 September 1983) is a Gabonese former professional footballer who played as a left-winger. He spent most of his career in the lower divisions of France and Italy. At international level, he made nine appearances scoring one goal for the Gabon national team between 2004 and 2010. He is the half-brother of footballer Pierre-Emerick Aubameyang.

== Club career ==
Aubameyang was born in Libreville, Gabon. He started his European career at Reggiana, and then transferred to AC Milan in 2000. In the 2001–02 season, Aubameyang made one appearance in the UEFA Cup, against BATE Borisov. In the 2002–03 season, he made one appearance in UEFA Champions League, against Deportivo La Coruña. He also made one appearance in Serie A as a starter in a 4–2 loss to Piacenza Calcio.

Aubameyang was then loaned to various teams, and went back to Gabon with 105 Libreville in the summer of 2006. In January 2007, he signed for Championnat National club Paris FC. At the beginning of the 2007–08 season, Aubameyang joined Ajaccio. From 2013 until his retirement in 2017, he played in lower divisions in Lombardy, Italy.

== International career ==
Born in Gabon, Aubameyang played once for the France under-19s. He earned nine caps for the Gabon national team, scoring one goal.

== Personal life ==
Catilina is the son of former Gabonese international Pierre Aubameyang. He is the elder brother of Willy Aubameyang and the half-brother of Pierre-Emerick Aubameyang. Through his father, Catilina also has French nationality, which enabled him to play for France's youth team.

== Career statistics ==
Score and result list Gabon's goal tally first, score column indicates score after Aubameyang goal.

International goal scored by Catilina Aubameyang
No.	Date	Venue	Opponent	Score	Result	Competition
1	5 September 2004	Stade 19 Mai 1956, Annaba, Algeria	Algeria	1–0	3–0	2006 FIFA World Cup qualification
